= Sheriff of Dumfries and Galloway =

The Sheriff of Dumfries and Galloway, was historically the royal official responsible for enforcing law and order in Dumfries and Galloway, Scotland. Prior to 1748 most sheriffdoms were held on a hereditary basis. From that date, following the Jacobite uprising of 1745, the hereditary sheriffs were replaced by salaried sheriff-deputes, qualified advocates who were members of the Scottish Bar.

The Sheriff of Dumfries had been retitled the Sheriff of Dumfries and Galloway in 1874 after the sheriffdom of Wigton and Kirkcudbright had been joined with the sheriffdom of Dumfries. The combined sheriffdom was replaced in 1975 by the current sheriffdom of South Strathclyde, Dumfries and Galloway.

== Sheriffs of Dumfries ==
- Thomas Randolph (c.1230–)
- Aymer Maxwell (1264–)
- William St. Clair (1288–)
- Robert de Joneby (1296–)
- Richard Siward (1305–) (died 1311)
- Matthew Redeman (1305)
- Dungal MacDouall (1310/1311)
- Richard Edgar (1329)
- Peter Tilloil (1334–)
- William Dacre, Baron Dacre (1346-)
- Adomar de Atheles
- William Douglas (c.1387–) (died 1391)
- Giles (Egidia) (daughter of above) (married Henry Sinclair, Earl of Orkney c.1407) (1391–1407)
- Henry II Sinclair, Earl of Orkney (c.1407–) (died 1420)
- Thomas Kirkpatrick (1434)
- William Sinclair, 1st Earl of Caithness (son of above) (-1455)
- Patrick Maclellan of Bombie - Sheriff of Galloway (died 1452)
- Robert Crichton of Sanquhar (1452-) (died 1494)
- Robert Crichton (son of above) (confirmed in office 1464, still in office 1508, died 1513)
- Successive Lord Crichtons of Sanquhar
- William Crichton, 1st Earl of Dumfries (died 1643)
- William Douglas, 1st Duke of Queensberry (confirmed 1664, died 1695)
- James Douglas, 2nd Duke of Queensberry (died 1711)
- Charles Douglas, 3rd Duke of Queensberry (in office 1747, died 1778)

Sheriffs-Depute

- William Kirkpatrick, 1747–1777? (died 1778)
- David Armstrong, 1777-1788?
- Edward Armstrong, 1788–1791?
- Robert Craigie, 1791–1811
- Sir Thomas Kirkpatrick, 5th Baronet, 1811–1844
- Mark Napier, 1844-1874

== Sheriffs of Dumfries and Galloway (1874) ==
- Mark Napier, 1874-?1879 (died 1879)
- Norman MacPherson, 1880-1890
- David Boyle Hope, 1890–1890 (Sheriff of Roxburgh, Berwick and Selkirk, 1890–1896)
- Richard Vary Campbell, 1890–1896 (Sheriff of Roxburgh, Berwick and Selkirk, 1896)
- James Wallace, 1896–1899
- Charles Joseph Galliari Rampini, 1899–1900
- James Alexander Fleming, 1900–1913 (Sheriff of Fife and Kinross 1913-1926)
- David Anderson, Lord St Vigeans, 1913–1917 (Sheriff of Renfrew and Argyll, 1917)
- Sir George Morton, 1917–1924 (Sheriff of Forfar 1924-1932)
- Charles Herbert Brown, 1924–1927 (Sheriff of the Lothians and Peebles 1927-1937)
- Patrick Balfour, Lord Kinross, 1927 - 1939
- Charles Milne, 1939–1960
- Margaret Henderson Kidd, QC, 1960–1966 (Sheriff of Perth and Angus 1966–1974)
- Alastair McPherson Johnston, 1966–1968
- David Brand, Lord Brand, 1968–1970
- Peter Maxwell, Lord Maxwell, 1970-1973
- Ian MacDonald, Lord Mayfield, MC, QC, 1973
- John Herbert McCluskey, 1973–1974
- W.I.R. Stewart, 1974
- Sheriffdom dissolved in 1975 and replaced by current sheriffdom of South Strathclyde, Dumfries and Galloway.

== See also ==
- Historical development of Scottish sheriffdoms
