= Sheriff of Caithness =

The Sheriff of Caithness was historically the royal official responsible for enforcing law and order in Caithness, Scotland.

The sheriffdom of Caithness appears to have been created in the mid 12th century and to have been dissolved and incorporated into the sheriffdom of Inverness in the 13th century. in 1455, William Sinclair, Earl of Caithness gained a grant of the justiciary and sheriffdom of the area from the Sheriff of Inverness. Prior to 1748 most sheriffdoms were held on a hereditary basis. From that date, following the Jacobite uprising of 1745, the hereditary sheriffs were replaced by salaried sheriff-deputes, qualified advocates who were members of the Scottish Bar.

In 1747, the office became known as the Sheriff of Caithness & Sutherland, however the sheriffdoms were disunited in 1806 again being known as the Sheriff of Caithness. It became the Sheriff of Sutherland & Caithness in 1857. In 1870 the office became known as the Sheriff of Caithness, Orkney & Shetland. It was again reorganised as the Sheriff of Caithness, Sutherland, Orkney & Zetland in 1946, but was abolished in 1975 when the current sheriffdom of Grampian, Highland and Islands was created.

== Sheriffs of Caithness ==
- William Sinclair, 1st Earl of Caithness, 1455–1470
- George Sinclair, 5th Earl of Caithness, to c. 1616
- John Sinclair, 1649–
- James Sinclair, pre 1661
- George Sinclair, 6th Earl of Caithness, 1661– (contested at first by rival claim of William Sinclair of Dunbeath)
- John Sinclair
- John Campbell, 1st Earl of Breadalbane and Holland
- Hereditary with the Earls of Breadalbane until 1735.
- George Sinclair, 1735–

== Sheriffs of Caithness and Sutherland (1747) ==
- James Brodie of Spynie, 1747–1756
- John Sinclair the younger, 1756–1784
- James Traill, 1784–1806 (Sheriff of Caithness, 1806–)
- For Sutherland sheriffs for 1806–1857 see Sheriff of Sutherland

== Sheriffs of Caithness (1806) ==
- James Traill, 1806–1832
- James Ivory, 1832–1833 (Sheriff of Bute, 1834–38)
- Robert Thomson, 1835–1857

== Sheriffs of Sutherland and Caithness (1857) ==
- George Dingwall Fordyce 1857–1870 (Sheriff of Ross, Cromarty and Sutherland, 1870–1874)
- For Sutherland after 1870 see Sheriff of Ross, Cromarty and Sutherland

== Sheriffs of Caithness, Orkney and Shetland (1870) ==
- George Hunter MacThomas Thoms, 1870–1899
- Christopher Nicholson Johnston, 1899–1900
- John Wilson, 1900–1905 (Sheriff of Inverness, Elgin and Nairn, 1905–1912)
- Frank Towers Cooper 1905–1905
- John Ferguson M'Lennan, KC, 1905–1917
- Andrew Henderson Briggs Constable, 1917–1920 (Sheriff of Argyll, 1920)
- James Campbell Pitman, 1920–1929
- Alexander Maitland, QC, 1929–1931
- John Charles Watson, QC, 1931–1944
- Thomas Blantyre Simpson, QC, 1944-1946

== Sheriffs of Caithness, Sutherland, Orkney & Zetland (1946) ==
- Thomas Blantyre Simpson, QC, 1946–1952 (Sheriff of Perth and Angus, 1952–1954)
- Francis Clifford Watt, QC, 1952–1961 (Sheriff of Stirling, Dunbarton and Clackmannan, 1961)
- Harald Robert Leslie, 1961–1965 (Chairman of Scottish Land Court, 1965)
- Sir Frederick William Fitzgerald O'Brien, 1965–1975
- Sheriffdom abolished in 1975 and replaced by the current sheriffdom of Grampian, Highland and Islands

== See also ==
- Historical development of Scottish sheriffdoms
