= Sheriff of Elgin =

The Sheriff of Elgin was historically the royal official responsible for enforcing law and order in Elgin, Scotland. Prior to 1748 most sheriffdoms were held on a hereditary basis. From that date, following the Jacobite uprising of 1745, they were replaced by salaried sheriff-deputes, qualified advocates who were members of the Scottish Bar.

After a merger the sheriff became the Sheriff of Elgin and Nairn in 1747. After further mergers the sheriffdom became part of the sheriffdom of Banff, Elgin & Nairn in 1854, part of the sheriffdom of Inverness, Elgin & Nairn in 1882 and part of the sheriffdom of Inverness, Moray, Nairn & Ross & Cromarty in 1946.

== Sheriffs of Elgin ==
- Alexander Douglas (1226-1235)
- Thomas Wiseman (1237-1249)
- Alexander de Montfort (1261)
- Reginald le Chen (1291-1297)
- Willam Wiseman (1304-1305)
- William de Strathbok (1337)
- William de Valognes (1362)
- Alexander Dunbar of Westfield (1446)
- Alexander Dunbar (1470)
- James Dunbar of Cumnock (c. 1497)

== Sheriffs-Depute of Elgin and Nairn (1747) ==
- Sir George Abercromby, 4th Baronet, 1783–>1822
- Robert Cunningham Graham Spiers, 1835-1840 (Sheriff of Edinburgh, 1840–1847)
- Cosmo Innes, 1840–1852
- Benjamin Robert Bell, 1852–1854 (Sheriff of Banff, Elgin and Nairn, 1854)
- Sheriffdom merged in 1854 to form the sheriffdom of Banff, Elgin and Nairn

== See also ==
- Historical development of Scottish sheriffdoms
