= Sheriff of Roxburgh, Berwick and Selkirk =

The Sheriff of Roxburgh was historically the royal official responsible for enforcing law and order in that area of Scotland. Prior to 1748 most sheriffdoms were held on a hereditary basis. From that date, following the Jacobite uprising of 1745, the hereditary sheriffs were replaced by salaried sheriff-deputes, qualified advocates who were members of the Scottish Bar.

The position of Sheriff of Roxburgh and Selkirk was created in 1868 following a merger of the position with that of Sheriff of Selkirk.

The combined sheriffdom was further enlarged in 1872 by its merger with part of the sheriffdom of Haddington and Berwick to create the sheriffdom of Roxburgh, Berwick and Selkirk. That resulting sheriffdom was dissolved in turn in 1975 with the creation of the current sheriffdom of Lothian and Borders.

== Sheriffs of Roxburgh ==
- Gospatric, c.1120 (first sheriff)
- Walter Corbet, 1199
- Bernard de Hauben, 1202
- Adam of Baggot, 1235
- Nicholas de Soules (died 1264), 1237, 1246
- Hugh de Abernethy, 1264-1266
- Thomas Cauer, 1266
- Thomas de Randuph, 1266
- Hugh de Peresby, 1285
- William de Sules, 1289
- Walter Tonk, 1295
- Ingram de Umfraville, 1299
- Robert Hastang, 1305
- Robert de Mauleye, 1306
- Robert de Maul, 1325
- Henry de Baliol, 1328
- Geoffrey de Moubray
- Alexander Ramsay, 1342
- William de Feltoun, -1343
- William Douglas, Lord of Liddesdale
- John de Coupland, 1347
- William Kareswell
- Henry de Percy, 3rd Baron Percy, 1355
- Richard Tempest, 1359
- Henry Kerr, 1359
- Alan de Strother, 1364
- Lawrence of Govan, 1373
- Thomas de Percy, 1376
- Thomas Umfraville
- Henry Percy (Hotspur)
- Malcolm Drummond, c.1389
- William Stewart of Jedforest, 1396
- George Douglas, 1st Earl of Angus, 1397
- George of Angus, 1398
- David Fleming of Biggar, 1402-1405 (killed by Douglases)
- Archibald Douglas
- Archibald Douglas of Cavers, 1412
- William Douglas of Cavers
- Archibald Douglas of Cavers, 1464
- William Douglas of Cavers and Cluny, 1470
  - James Douglas, 1470 - Deputy
- Archibald Douglas, 5th Earl of Angus, 1488
- held by Douglas family until 1747

Sheriffs-Depute

- 1748-1753: Gilbert Eliot
- 1753: William Scott of Woll
- 1754-1769: Walter Pringle
- 1769-: Patrick Murray of Cherrytrees
- 1780–1807: William Oliver of Dinlabyre
- 1807–>1861: William Oliver Rutherfurd of Edgerston

== Sheriffs of Roxburgh, Berwick and Selkirk (1872) ==
- John Cheyne, 1885-1886 (Sheriff of Ross, Cromarty and Sutherland, 1886–89)
- Andrew Jameson, 1886–1890
- David Boyle Hope, 29 Nov 1890-1896
- Richard Vary Campbell, 15 Oct 1896–1901
- Edward Theodore Salvesen, 1901–1905
- John Chisholm, 1905–1929
- John Mair Hunter, 1929–1944
- Maurice John King 1944–1952
- William Ross MacLean, QC, 1952–1955 (Renfrew and Argyll, 1955–1960)
- John Jeffrey Cunningham, QC, 1955–1956
- Harald Robert Leslie, QC, 1956–1961 (Sheriff of Caithness, 1961–65)
- George Gordon Stott, QC, 1961–64
- Robert Smith Johnston, 1964–1970
- David Brand, Lord Brand, 1970
- Henry Keith, Baron Keith of Kinkel, QC, 1970–1971
- Ronald Alastair Bennett, QC, 1971–
- John Oswald Mair Hunter, Lord Hunter QC 1972-1975
- Sheriffdom dissolved in 1975 and replaced by the sheriffdom of Lothian and Borders.

== See also ==
- Historical development of Scottish sheriffdoms
