= Sheriff of Banff =

Historic law enforcement office in Banff, Scotland

The Sheriff of Banff was historically the office responsible for enforcing law and order and bringing criminals to justice in Banff, Scotland.

Prior to 1748 most sheriffdoms were held on a hereditary basis. From that date, following the Jacobite rising of 1745, the hereditary sheriffs were replaced by salaried sheriff-deputes, qualified advocates who were members of the Scottish Bar.

Following a merger of sheriffdoms it became the Sheriff of Banff, Elgin & Nairn in 1854 and the Sheriff of Aberdeen, Kincardine & Banff in 1882.

== Sheriffs of Banff ==
Sheriffs-Principal

- Alexander Comyn, Earl of Buchan (ER, i: clxxviii, clxxx; and 15)
- Ranulf de Strachan(1264) (ER, i: clxxviii, clxxx; and 15)
- John Comyn, Earl of Buchan (1290) (ER, i, 49)
- Walter de Berkeley (1304-1305)
- Duncan de Ferendraught (1305)
- Hamelin of Troup (1328)
- Phillip de Meldrum (1343)
- William de Fotheringham (1357)
  - Nicolas Hawden - 1357 - Deputy
- John de Inverpefer (1369)
- Alexander Ogilvie, (1452-1453)
  - Walter Ogilvie of Beaufort - 1452 - Deputy
- Walter Ogilvie of Beaufort (1453-?)
- William Abernethy (1458)
  - Archibald Liddle - 1470 - Deputy
- James Stewart, 1st Earl of Buchan (1470)
  - Robert Stewart - 1470 - Deputy
- George Baird, 1634- (died 1642)
- Alexander Douglas 1654-
- James Erskine, 7th Earl of Buchan (died 1664)
- Sir James Baird of Auchmedden, c.1664 (died 1691) (jointly)
- James Baird the younger, 1668-?1681 (jointly with James Baird of Auchmedden) (died 1681)
- Sir George Gordon of Edinglassie, 1681-1691 (jointly with Sir James Baird of Auchmedden)
- James Ogilvy, 4th Earl of Findlater, 1693–?1730

Sheriffs-Depute

- Robert Pringle, Lord Edgefield, 1748–1754
- George Cockburn (Haldane), 1756–1764 ( Sheriff of Stirling and Clackmannan, 1764–70)
- John Erskine, June 1764-September 1764
- Keith Urquhart of Meldrum and Bethelnie, 1764–1835
- Alexander Currie, 1837–1854 (Sheriff of Forfar, 1854–)

== Sheriffs of Banff, Elgin and Nairn (1854) ==
- Benjamin Robert Bell, 1854–1882
- Sheriffdom divided in 1882 between the sheriffdoms of Aberdeen, Kincardine & Banff and Inverness, Elgin and Nairn.

== See also ==
- Historical development of Scottish sheriffdoms
