= Sheriff of Clackmannan =

Former law and order role in Clackmannan, Scotland

The Sheriff of Clackmannan was historically the office responsible for enforcing law and order in Clackmannan, Scotland and bringing criminals to justice. Prior to 1748 most sheriffdoms were held on a hereditary basis. From that date, following the Jacobite uprising of 1745, the hereditary sheriffs were replaced by salaried sheriff-deputes, qualified advocates who were members of the Scottish Bar.

Following mergers the sheriff became the Sheriff of Clackmannan & Stirling in 1747, Sheriff of Clackmannan & Kinross in 1807 and the Sheriff of Linlithgow, Clackmannan & Kinross in 1865. Following further reorganisation in 1881 Clackmannan became part of the Sheriffdom of Stirling, Dumbarton & Clackmannan.

== Sheriffs of Clackmannan ==
- Gille Muire (1164)
- Alexander de Stirling (1200-1207)
- William Bissett (1303-1304)
- Malcolm de Inverpefer (1304-1305)
- Henry de Anand (1305-1306)
- John de Stirling (1306)
- Henry de Anand (1328)
- John de Monteith (1353-1382)
- William Menteith (1382)
- John Menteith (1470)
- John Schaw of Alweth (1489)
- William Menteith of Kers (1489)
- William Livingston (1631)
- Thomas Hope, (1638-1651)
- Protectorate
- Sir Alexander Hope, (1662–66) (resigned)
- Henry Bruce, (1668-1674)
- David Bruce, (1674–c.1693) (deprived as Jacobite)
- Robert Stewart, (1698)
- William Morrison, (1698-1700)
- no record, (1700-1712)
- William Dalrymple, (1712–1742)
- William Dalrymple, Earl of Dumfries, (1742–1747)

== Sheriffs of Clackmannan and Stirling (1747) ==
- 1748 - Clackmannan combined with Stirling
- David Walker, 1748–1761
- Robert Bruce, 1761–1764
- George Cockburn (later Haldane), 1764–1770
- Alexander Abercromby, Lord Abercromby, 1770–1780
- John Pringle, 1780–1790
- William Tait, 1790–1797
- David Williamson (later Robertson Ewart), 1797–1807 )

== Sheriffs of Clackmannan and Kinross (1807) ==
- Clackmannan separated from Stirling and combined with Kinross
- Sir James Moncreiff, Lord Moncrieff, 1808–1829
- John Tait, 1830–1865

== Sheriffs of Linlithgow ==
- William St. Clair (1264)
- William St. Clair (1290)
- James Hamilton, 1st Earl of Abercorn, 1600–
- Sir William Hope of Grantown, 1682–1702
- Charles Hope, 1702–1742
- John Hope, 1742–1747

Sheriffs-Depute (1748)

- John Gillon of Wellhouse, 1748–
- William Baillie, 1772–1793
- David Hume, 1793–>1808
- Joshua Henry MacKenzie, 1811–?1822
- John Cay, 1822–1865

== Sheriffs of Linlithgow, Clackmannan and Kinross, (1865) ==
- John Tait, 1865–1866
- George Monro, 1866–1881
- Sheriffdom divided in 1881 between the three new sheriffdoms of The Lothians, Stirling, Dumbarton & Clackmannan and Fife & Kinross

== See also ==
- Historical development of Scottish sheriffdoms
