= Sheriff of Dumbarton =

Historic royal office in Dumbarton, Scotland

The Sheriff of Dumbarton was historically the royal official responsible for enforcing law and order in Dumbarton, Scotland and bringing criminals to justice. Prior to 1748 most sheriffdoms were held on a hereditary basis. From that date, following the Jacobite uprising of 1745, the hereditary sheriffs were replaced by salaried sheriff-deputes, qualified advocates who were members of the Scottish Bar.

Following a merger the post was retitled the Sheriff of Dumbarton and Bute in 1854. Following further reorganisations the post became the Sheriff of Stirling and Dumbarton in 1871 and the Sheriff of Stirling, Dumbarton and Clackmannan in 1881.

== Sheriffs of Dumbarton ==
- William Bisset (1237)
- Uilleam, Earl of Mar (1264–1266)
- Malcolm Fleming (ca 1249-1286)
- Walter Bailloch Stewart (1271–1288)
- Duncan III, Earl of Fife (1288)
- Alexander, Earl of Menteith (1289-?)
- Walter Bailloch Stewart (1290)
- James Stewart, 5th High Steward of Scotland (1293)
- Alexander of Ledes (1296)
- John de Menteith (1303–1308)
- Malcolm Fleming of Fulwood, 1st Earl of Wigtown (c.1308-1353)
- John Danielston (1357-1364)
- Malcolm Fleming of Biggar (1364-1367)
- John Danielston (1371-1375)
- Robert Danielston (1377-1379)
- Walter Buchanan (1407)
- Walter Stewart of Lennox (1416)
- John Colquhoun of Luss (1425)
- John Colquhoun (1471)
- John Stewart, 1st Earl of Lennox (1488)
- Matthew Stewart, 2nd Earl of Lennox (1494)
- John C Paull (1530)
- Walter McAulay (1626)
- John Graham of Killearn (1715)

== Deputy Sheriffs ==
- Robert Sempill, 1443
- James Colquhoun, 1775–1805
- John Glassford, c.1808
- John Campbell Colquhoun of Milligs, 1815–1854

== Sheriffs of Dumbarton and Bute (1854) ==
- Robert Hunter, 1854–1871
- The sheriffdom was split in 1871, with Dumbarton becoming part of the new sheriffdom of Stirling and Dumbarton and Bute becoming part of the Sheriffdom of Renfrew and Bute.

== See also ==
- Historical development of Scottish sheriffdoms

== Sources ==
- Irving, Joseph (1860). The History of Dumbartonshire. Dumbarton.
- Douglas, Sir Robert (1764). The Peerage of Scotland. Edinburgh.
