= James Veitch, Lord Elliock =

Scottish advocate, judge, politician and landowner (1712–1793)

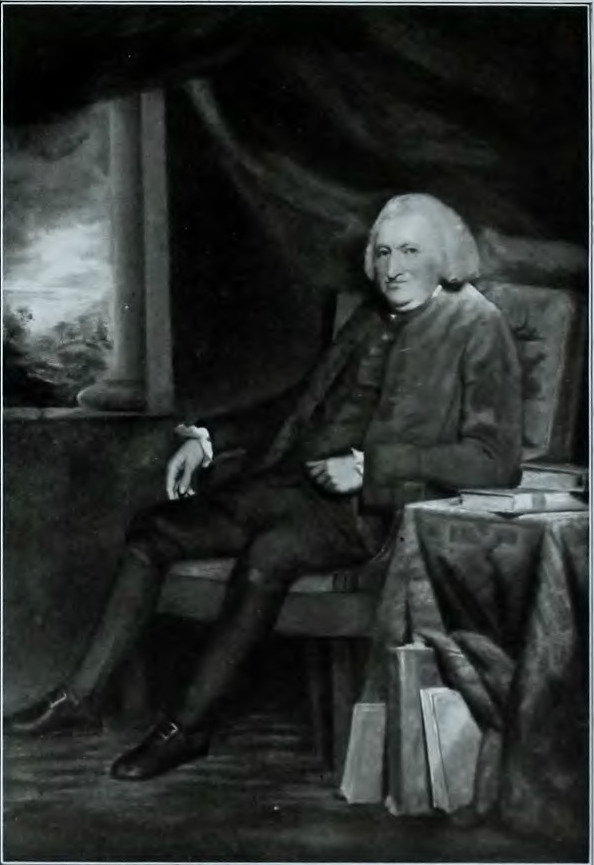
- portrait by Henry Raeburn
- Born: 25 September 1712
- Died: 1 July 1793 (aged 80)
- Alma mater: University of Edinburgh; Leiden University
- Occupation: Judge

James Veitch, Lord Elliock FRSE (25 September 1712 – 1 July 1793) was a Scottish advocate, judge, politician and landowner who became a Senator of the College of Justice.

== Life ==
He was born in Edinburgh in September 1712, the son of Christian Thomson, daughter of Gavin Thomson, Provost of Peebles, and William Veitch of Elliock House near Dumfries, a Writer to the Signet (WS) who died in 1747.

Veitch studied law at the University of Edinburgh, Leyden University and Halle University. While in Germany he met and apparently befriended Frederick the Great. He passed the Scottish bar as an advocate and was elected to the Faculty of Advocates in 1738.

He was appointed Sheriff-Depute of Peebles in 1747. He served as MP for Dumfriesshire from 1755 to 1760.

In 1761 he was elected a Senator of the College of Justice in the place of Andrew Macdowal, Lord Bankton.

In Novemberv 1763 he is noted as living in the Jock's Lodge area of Edinburgh and was the first point of contact after the post-boy was mugged and robbed of his horse and mailbags.

He was Commissioner for Forfeited Estates in 1769, as Deputy Governor of the Royal Bank of Scotland (1776–), and as a member of the Board of Trustees for Manufactures & Fisheries (1777–).

In 1775 he is listed as living at Jock's Lodge to the east of Edinburgh. He moved to St Andrew Square in the 1780s, as soon as the houses were built.

In 1783 he was a founding Fellow of the Royal Society of Edinburgh.

He died at St Andrew Square, Edinburgh, on 1 July 1793. His position as Senator was filled by William Baillie, Lord Polkemmet. He was buried in Restalrig Churchyard in eastern Edinburgh on 5 July.

Parliament of the United Kingdom
Preceded by Lord Charles Douglas	Member of Parliament for Dumfriesshire; 1755–1761	Succeeded by Archibald Douglas
