= Sheriff of Inverness =

Scottish law office until 1975

The Sheriff of Inverness was historically the office responsible for enforcing law and order and bringing criminals to justice in Inverness, Scotland. Prior to 1748 most sheriffdoms were held on a hereditary basis. From that date, following the Jacobite uprising of 1745, the hereditary sheriffs were replaced by salaried sheriff-deputes, qualified advocates who were members of the Scottish Bar.

Following mergers the office became the Sheriff of Inverness, Elgin & Nairn in 1882 and the Sheriff of Inverness, Moray, Nairn & Ross & Cromarty in 1946. That sheriffdom was dissolved in turn in 1975 and replaced by that of the Sheriff Principal of Grampian, Highland and Islands.

== Sheriffs of Inverness ==
- William de Moravia (1204)
- William Pratt (1227)
- Michael Mowat (1234)
- Lawrence Grant (1263)
- Alexander Murray (1266)
- William de Soulis (1291)
- Alan Durward (1291)
- Reginald le Chen (1292)
- William de la Hay (1295)
- John Stirling of Moray (1305-?)
- Alexander Pilche (1307-1328)
- Maurice Grant (1340)
- Robert de Chisholm (1359)
- John of Ross (1360)
- John Hay of Tullybothill (1364)
- Galfrid de Munbeyn (1370)
- Alan de Winton (1370)
- William Lambe (1376)
- Alexander Stewart, Earl of Buchan (1380-1390)
  - William Fotheringay - 1383 - Acting
- Thomas Dunbar, 5th Earl of Moray (1390-?)
  - William Fotheringay - 1398 - Deputy
- Hugh Fraser (1430)
- William Leslie (1440)
  - John Grant - 1442 - Deputy
- John Macdonald, Earl of Ross and Lord of the Isles (1455-1460)
  - Celestine of the Isles - 1460 - Deputy
- George Gordon, 5th Earl of Huntly (1556-?)
- George Gordon, 6th Earl of Huntly (at 1584)
- Simon Fraser, 6th Lord Lovat (c. 1599)

High-Sheriffs

- Simon Fraser, 11th Lord Lovat (c. 1667–1747)

Sheriffs-Depute

- Simon Fraser, 1781–1810
- William Fraser Tytler, 1810–1852
- George Young, 1853–1860 (Sheriff of Haddington and Berwick, 1860–62)
- Andrew Rutherfurd Clark, 1860–1862 (Sheriff of Haddington and Berwick, 1862–69)
- William Ivory, 1862–1882

== Sheriffs of Inverness, Elgin & Nairn (1882) ==
- William Ivory, 1882–1900
- Christopher Nicholson Johnston, 1900–1905
- James Ferguson, 1905–1905
- John Wilson, Lord Ashmore, 1905–1912 (Sheriff of Renfrew and Bute, 1912)
- Alastair Oswald Morison Mackenzie, 1912–1917 (Sheriff of Renfrew and Bute, 1917)
- George Watt KC, 1917– 1934
- Robert Henry Maconochie KC, 1934–1942 (Sheriff of Stirling, Dumbarton and Clackmannan, 1942–1961)
- Charles Mackintosh KC, 1942–1944 (Senator of the College of Justice from 1944)
- Ronald Peter Morison KC, 1944-1945
- John Cameron, 1945–1946

== Sheriffs of Inverness, Moray, Nairn & Ross & Cromarty (1946) ==
- John Cameron, 1946–1948
- Hector MacKechnie, QC, –1958 (Sheriff of Perth and Angus, 1958)
- Douglas Mason Campbell, QC, 1958–
- Sheriffdom dissolved in 1975 and replaced by that of Grampian, Highland and Islands.

== See also ==
- Historical development of Scottish sheriffdoms
