= Alexander Wiseman =

Scottish nobleman and sheriff

Alexander Wiseman was a 13th-14th century Scottish nobleman and the Sheriff of Forres and Nairn.

== Life ==
Alexander was the brother of William Wiseman and was appointed in 1305, as the Sheriff of Forres and Nairn.
