= Sheriff of Nairn =

Extinct position of law enforcer in Nairn, Scotland

The Sheriff of Nairn was historically the office responsible for enforcing law and order and bringing criminals to justice in Nairn, Scotland. In 1747 the office was merged with that of the Sheriff of Elgin to create the office of Sheriff of Elgin and Nairn.

== Sheriffs of Nairn ==
- William de Moravia (1204)
- William Prat (1227)
- Alexander Murray (1263-1267)
- Reginald le Chen (1291)
- Alexander Wiseman (1305)
- Donald de Cawdor
- William de Cawdor (1442)
- William de Cawdor (1475)
- Hugh de Cawdor
- For sheriffs after 1747 see sheriff of Elgin and Nairn.

== See also ==
- Historical development of Scottish sheriffdoms
