= John Wheatley, Lord Wheatley =

Scottish lawyer and judge (born 1941)

The Right Honourable Lord Wheatley

Senator of the College of Justice
- In office 2000–2011

Personal details
- Born: John Francis Wheatley; 9 May 1941 (age 85)
- Spouse: Brownwen Fraser
- Education: University of Edinburgh
- Profession: Advocate

John Francis Wheatley, Lord Wheatley, PC (born 9 May 1941) is a Scottish lawyer and retired Senator of the College of Justice, a judge of the Supreme Courts of Scotland, sitting in the High Court of Justiciary and the Inner House of the Court of Session. He is an authority on road traffic law. His father, John Wheatley, Baron Wheatley, was Lord Justice Clerk between 1972 and 1985, the second-most senior judge in Scotland.

== Early life ==
Wheatley was born the son of John Thomas Wheatley and Agnes Nichol. His father, a distinguished lawyer, had served as Solicitor General and Lord Advocate, before being appointed a judge and rising to the rank of Lord Justice Clerk, the second-most senior judge in Scotland. The young Wheatley was educated at his father's former school, Mount St Mary's College, an independent Jesuit boarding school in Derbyshire, and studied at the School of Law of the University of Edinburgh.

== Legal career ==
Wheatley was admitted to the Faculty of Advocates in 1966, and appointed Standing Counsel to the Scottish Development Department in 1971, and Advocate Depute in 1975. He was appointed a Sheriff of Tayside, Central and Fife in 1979, serving at Dunfermline from 1979 to 1980, and at Perth from 1980 to 2000. In 1998 he was promoted Sheriff Principal of Tayside, Central and Fife. He was appointed a Temporary High Court Judge in 1992 and took silk in 1993.

In 2000, Wheatley was appointed a Senator of the College of Justice, a judge of the High Court of Justiciary and Court of Session, Scotland's Supreme Courts, taking the judicial title, Lord Wheatley. From 2002 to 2006, he was Chairman of the Judicial Studies Committee, the body responsible for the training of judges. He was promoted to the Inner House of the Court of Session, and to the Privy Council, in 2007.

== Governor ==
Wheatley was a member of the Board of Governors of Lendrick Muir School, a special school for maladjusted boys and girls in the Fossoway area of Kinross,

== In popular culture ==
In the 2021 mini-series A Very British Scandal, Wheatley was played by Jonathan Aris.

== Personal life ==
Lord Wheatley married Bronwen Fraser in 1970, with whom he has two sons. He stood as the Labour Party candidate in Dumfries in the February and October 1974 general elections. His recreations include gardening and music, and he is the founder, and current President, of the Faculty of Advocates' football team, Faculty Phantoms FC. He lives in Fossoway, Kinross-shire.

== See also ==
- List of Senators of the College of Justice
