= Alexander de Stirling =

Scottish noble (died 1244)

- Died: 1244
- Noble family: Stirling family

Sir Alexander de Stirling (died 1244), Lord of Ochiltree, Justiciar of Lothian, Sheriff of Stirling, was a 13th-century Scottish noble.

== Life ==
Stirling was the eldest son of William de Stirling. He held the office of Justiciar of Lothian jointly between 1206 and 1215 and Sheriff of Stirling at various times between 1189 and 1242. Alexander had lease of 1/3rd share of the Lordship of Cadder and was succeeded by his younger brother John.
