= Richard Vary Campbell =

Scottish advocate and author of legal books

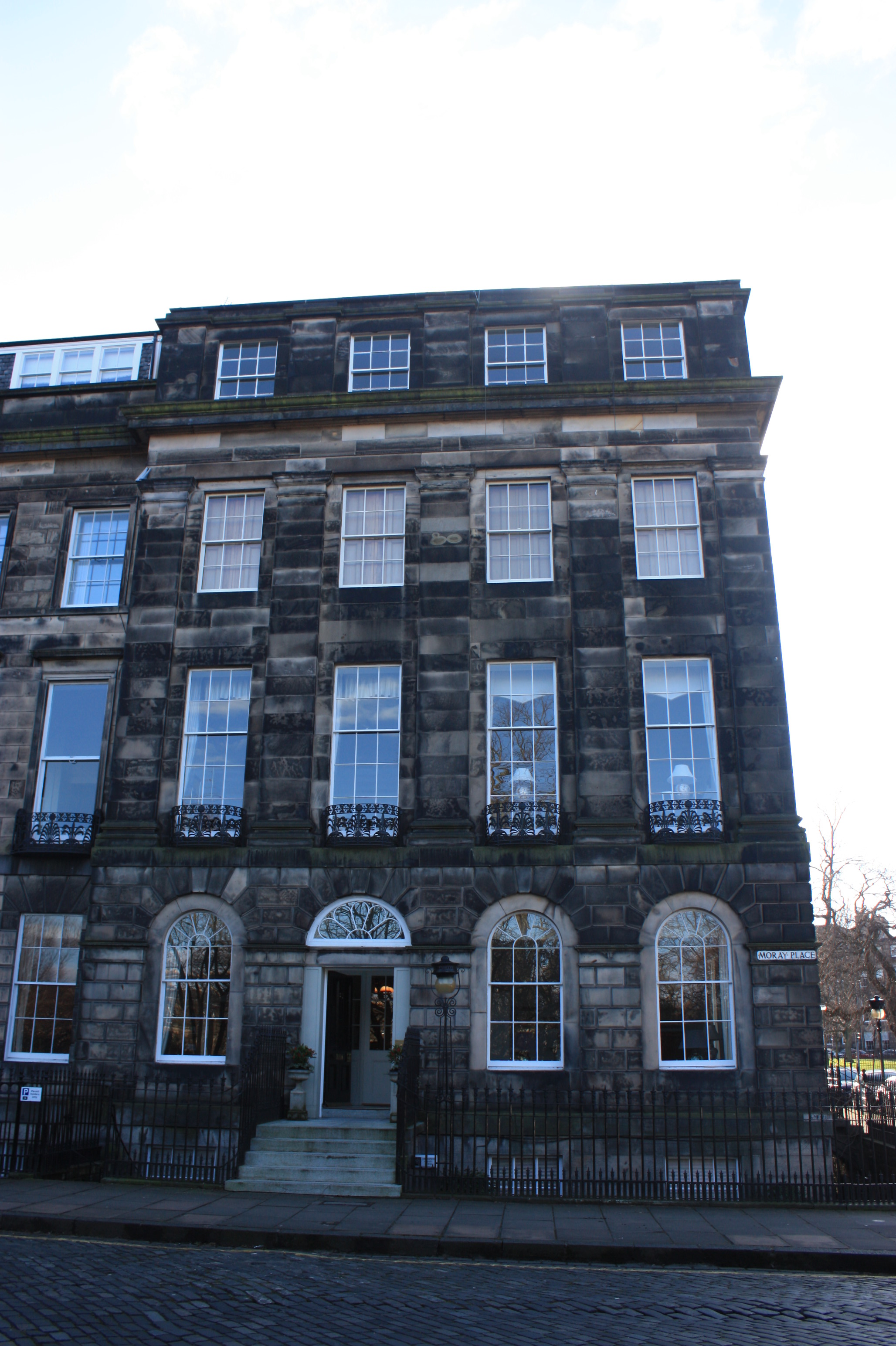
37 Moray Place, Edinburgh

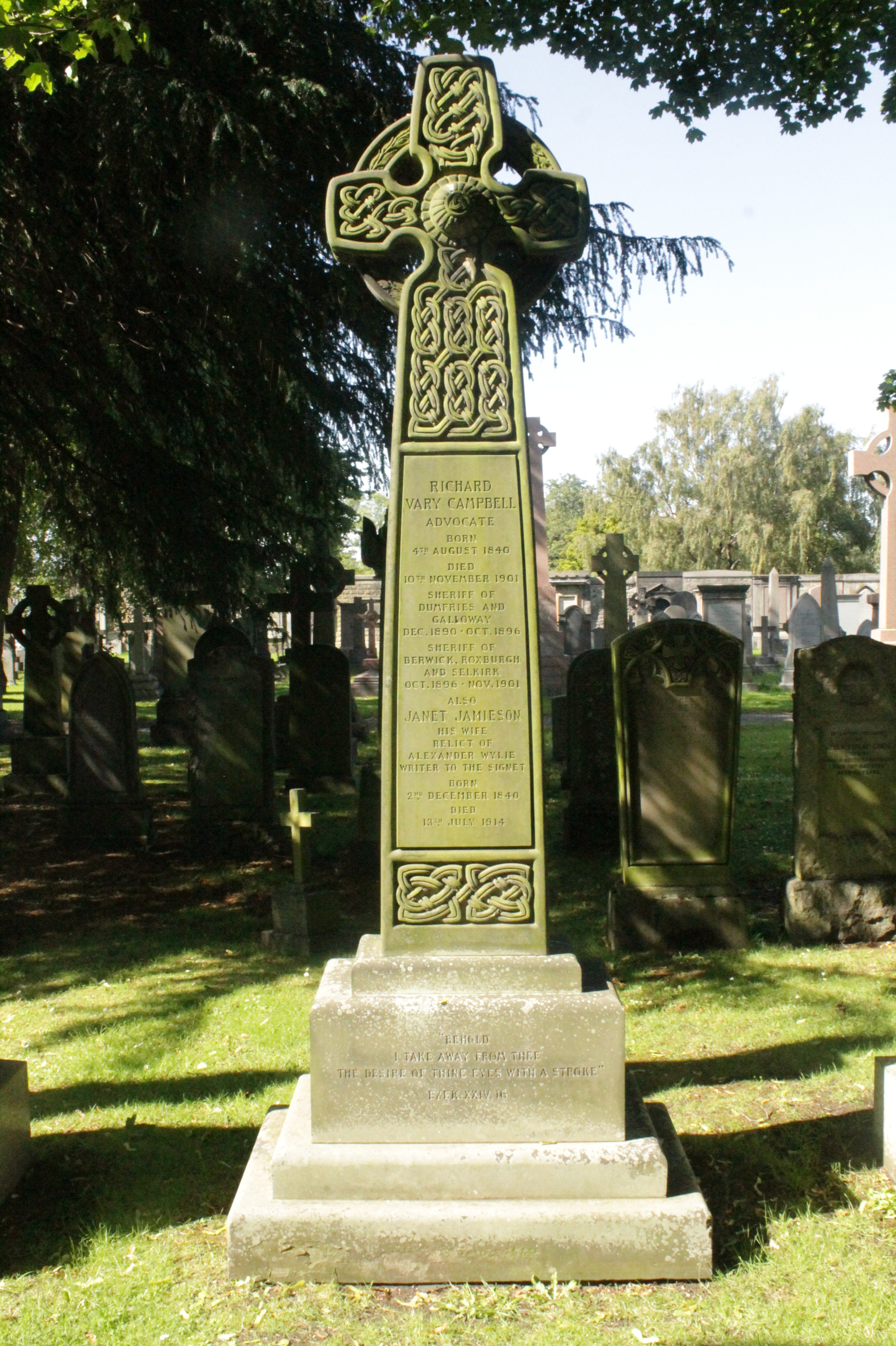
The grave of Richard Vary Campbell, Dean Cemetery

Richard Vary Campbell FRSE FSA (1840–1901) was a Scottish advocate and author of legal books, who rose to be Sheriff of Roxburgh. He was also a Commissioner of the Northern Lighthouse Board.

== Life ==
Richard Campbell was born in Glasgow on 4 August 1840, the son of David Campbell, a wine and spirit merchant from a Perthshire family, and Jane Vary, he was educated at Glasgow High School. He then studied Philosophy at Glasgow University (graduating MA in 1861) and began a legal apprenticeship with Robert Lamond before moving to Edinburgh to study Scots Law and Civil Law, graduating LLB. He then studied further at Heidelberg University before being appointed to the Scottish Bar. He became an advocate in 1864. He rose to be Sheriff of Dumfries and Galloway in 1890 and from 1896 was Sheriff of Roxburgh, Berwick and Selkirk.

In 1886, Richard unsuccessfully stood as the Liberal Unionist Party's candidate to be Member of Parliament for the Glasgow College constituency, losing to Sir Charles Cameron.

Richard was an expert on Church Law and addressed the General Assembly of the Church of Scotland on several occasions. He was Chairman of the Edinburgh Street Tramways Association and a Commissioner of the Northern Lighthouse Board. He was later elected a Fellow of the Royal Society of Edinburgh in 1898, his proposers including Sir Stair Agnew.

Richard later died at his home, 37 Moray Place in Edinburgh, at 10am on 10 November 1901, ten days after catching a cold whilst attending a wedding in Peebles.

Richard is buried in Dean Cemetery in western Edinburgh. The grave lies facing the southern path of the northern Victorian extension.

== Family ==
Campbell married exceptionally late in life. He married at Stow on 21 March 1900 Janet Jamieson (1840–1914), widow of Alexander Wylie, Writer of the Signet. She is buried with him.

== Publications ==
- Registration Law
- Lectures on Mercantile Law (1890)
- The Reform Act of 1868
