= Sheriff of Bute =

The Sheriff of Bute was historically the office responsible for enforcing law and order on the Isle of Bute, Scotland and bringing criminals to justice.

Before the Jacobite uprising of 1745 and the abolition of hereditary jurisdictions in 1746, the office was hereditary until shifting to salaried sheriffs by 1748. The office was mostly held by the Stewarts of Bute. The most historically prominent Sheriff was John Stuart, 3rd Earl of Bute.

The sheriffdom was combined with Dumbarton in 1854 to form the sheriffdom of Dumbarton & Bute. In 1871 it was split and Bute was combined with Renfrew to form the sheriffdom of Renfrew & Bute. The sheriffdom was split again in 1946, when Bute was combined with Ayr to form the sheriffdom of Ayr & Bute.

== Sheriffs of Bute ==
- John Stewart 1385
- James Stewart 1445-1449
- Ninian Stewart
- Thomas Boyd, Earl of Arran 1468
- Ninian Stewart 1492
- Sir John Stuart of Bute
- John Stuart, 3rd Earl of Bute, 1723-1746

Sheriffs-Depute

- William Macleod Bannatyne, 1776–1799
- John James Edmonstone, 1799–1818
- Samuel McCormick, 1818-34
- James Ivory, 1834-1838
- Robert Hunter, 1839–1854
- For sheriffs after 1854 see Sheriff of Dumbarton and Bute

== See also ==
- Historical development of Scottish sheriffdoms
