= John Wilson, Lord Ashmore =

Scottish lawyer, parliamentary candidate, sheriff principal and judge

John Wilson, Lord Ashmore (1857 – 8 July 1932) was a Scottish lawyer, a unionist parliamentary candidate, a sheriff principal and a judge.

== Early life ==
Wilson was born in 1857 in Falkirk, where his father James Wilson was a solicitor. He was educated at the Royal High School of Edinburgh and the University of Edinburgh.

== Career ==
After graduating from university, Wilson initially joined his father's practice in Falkirk. However, in 1885 he was admitted as an advocate in Scotland, and set up a large practice. He was particularly skilled in examining witnesses, and undertook a lot of parliamentary cases.

=== Politics ===
Wilson was a parliamentary candidate twice in the 1890s, both times as a Conservative Party or Liberal Unionist (it is not clear which), and both times unsuccessfully. At the 1895 general election he contested the Leith Burghs against the Liberal Ronald Munro Ferguson (later Lord Norvar).

He was defeated again at the by-election in 1896 for the Montrose Burghs, where the sitting Liberal MP John Shiress Will had resigned in order to create a vacancy for John Morley, the Chief Secretary for Ireland.

=== Legal career ===
Wilson took silk in Scotland in 1900. He was called to the English bar in 1900 at the Inner Temple, and became a King's Counsel in England in 1901.

He was appointed in March 1900 as Sheriff of Caithness, Orkney and Shetland, and transferred in May 1905 to become Sheriff of Inverness, Elgin and Nairn. He held that shrievalty until 1912, when he became Sheriff of Renfrew and Bute, when he transferred again to become Sheriff of Perth.

During his two decades as a sheriff, Wilson held numerous other public offices. He was a Commissioner of Northern Lights from 1900 to 1917, and at various times was Prison Commissioner for Scotland, a Commissioner of the General Board of Control for Scotland.

To fill the vacancy created by the death of Lord Guthrie, Wilson was appointed in 1920 as a Senator of the College of Justice, taking the judicial title Lord Ashmore. He was installed as judge on 8 June in a ceremony presided over by the Lord Justice General, Lord Clyde.

His judgments included a 1924 case of a couple who had been married at Gretna by the village blacksmith, in his smithy. They sought a declarator that their marriage was legal, which Ashmore granted, allowing hem to register their marriage.

After 8 years on the bench, Lord Ashmore resigned as a judge in 1928. He was succeeded by Alexander Morrice Mackay, styled Lord Mackay.

== Personal life ==
Wilson's brothers included Gregg Wilson, who became Professor of Zoology at Queen's University Belfast from 1909 to 1931, and David Mackay Wilson (died 1929) an advocate who became a King's Counsel and a sheriff-substitute.

In 1884 he married Lillias Hartley from Ruthwell in Dumfriesshire, and together they had one daughter and two sons, one of whom was killed in World War I.

Lord Ashmore died on 8 July 1932 at Radlett in Hertfordshire, aged 75.
