= Iain Macphail, Lord Macphail =

Scottish lawyer and judge

The Honourable Lord Macphail

Senator of the College of Justice
- In office 2005–2009
- Nominated by: Jack McConnell; As First Minister
- Monarch: Elizabeth

Personal details
- Born: Iain Duncan Macphail; 24 January 1938 Falkirk
- Died: 21 October 2009 (aged 71)
- Education: University of Edinburgh, University of Glasgow
- Profession: Advocate

Iain Duncan Macphail, Lord Macphail (24 January 1938 – 21 October 2009) was a Scottish lawyer and Senator of the College of Justice, a judge of the country's Supreme Courts.

== Early life ==
Macphail was educated at the independent George Watson’s College, Edinburgh, and studied at the University of Edinburgh (M.A. (Hons.) History 1959), and at the School of Law of the University of Glasgow (LL.B. 1962). He was admitted to the Faculty of Advocates in 1963. Between 1963 and 1965, he held a Faulds Fellowship in Law at Glasgow, and was succeeded in this position by Robin McEwan (later Lord McEwan). From 1968 to 1969, he was a lecturer in Evidence and Procedure at the School of Law of the University of Strathclyde, and from 1969 to 1972, held the same position at the School of Law of the University of Edinburgh.

== Legal career ==
From 1971 to 1973, Macphail served as Standing Junior Counsel to Scottish Home and Health Department and the Department of Health and Social Security. In 1973, he served briefly as an Extra Advocate-Depute, and the same year was appointed a Sheriff of Lanarkshire (later Glasgow and Strathkelvin), based in Glasgow. From 1978 to 1981, he was Chairman of the Scottish Association for the Study of Delinquency. In 1981, he moved to the Sheriffdom of Tayside, Central and Fife, based at Alloa, and in 1982 to Lothian and Borders, based at Linlithgow. He served there until 1989, when he took up office as a Law Commissioner, and was appointed Queen's Counsel in 1990. Following completion of his term in 1994, he returned to the shrieval bench at Linlithgow in 1995, and was appointed Sheriff Principal of Lothian and Borders, and Sheriff of Chancery, in 2002.

From 2001 to 2002, he was Arthur Goodhart Visiting Professor in Legal Science at the Faculty of Law of the University of Cambridge, and from 2003 to 2005, was a member of the Judicial Studies Committee and Chairman of the Sheriff Court Rules Council. He was a member of the editorial board of the Criminal Law Review from 2001 until his death. In 2005, he was appointed a Senator of the College of Justice, a judge of the Court of Session and High Court of Justiciary, the Supreme Courts of Scotland.

=== Publications ===
- Evidence, 1987 (Law Society of Scotland)
- Sheriff Court Practice, 1988 (W. Green)
- The Laws of Scotland: Stair Memorial Encyclopaedia, 1990 (Law Society of Scotland), Vol. 10, Title on Evidence

== Personal life ==
Lord Macphail married Rosslyn Graham Lillias in 1970, with whom he had a son and a daughter. He was a Commissioner of the Northern Lighthouse Board between 2002 and 2005. He received an honorary LL.D. from the University of Edinburgh in 1992. He was a member of the New Club. Lord Macphail died after a long illness on 21 October 2009.

== See also ==
- List of Senators of the College of Justice
