= David Anderson, Lord St Vigeans =

Scottish advocate and judge

The Honourable Lord St Vigeans

Chairman of the Scottish Land Court
- In office 1918–1934
- Preceded by: Lord Kennedy
- Succeeded by: Lord MacGregor Mitchell

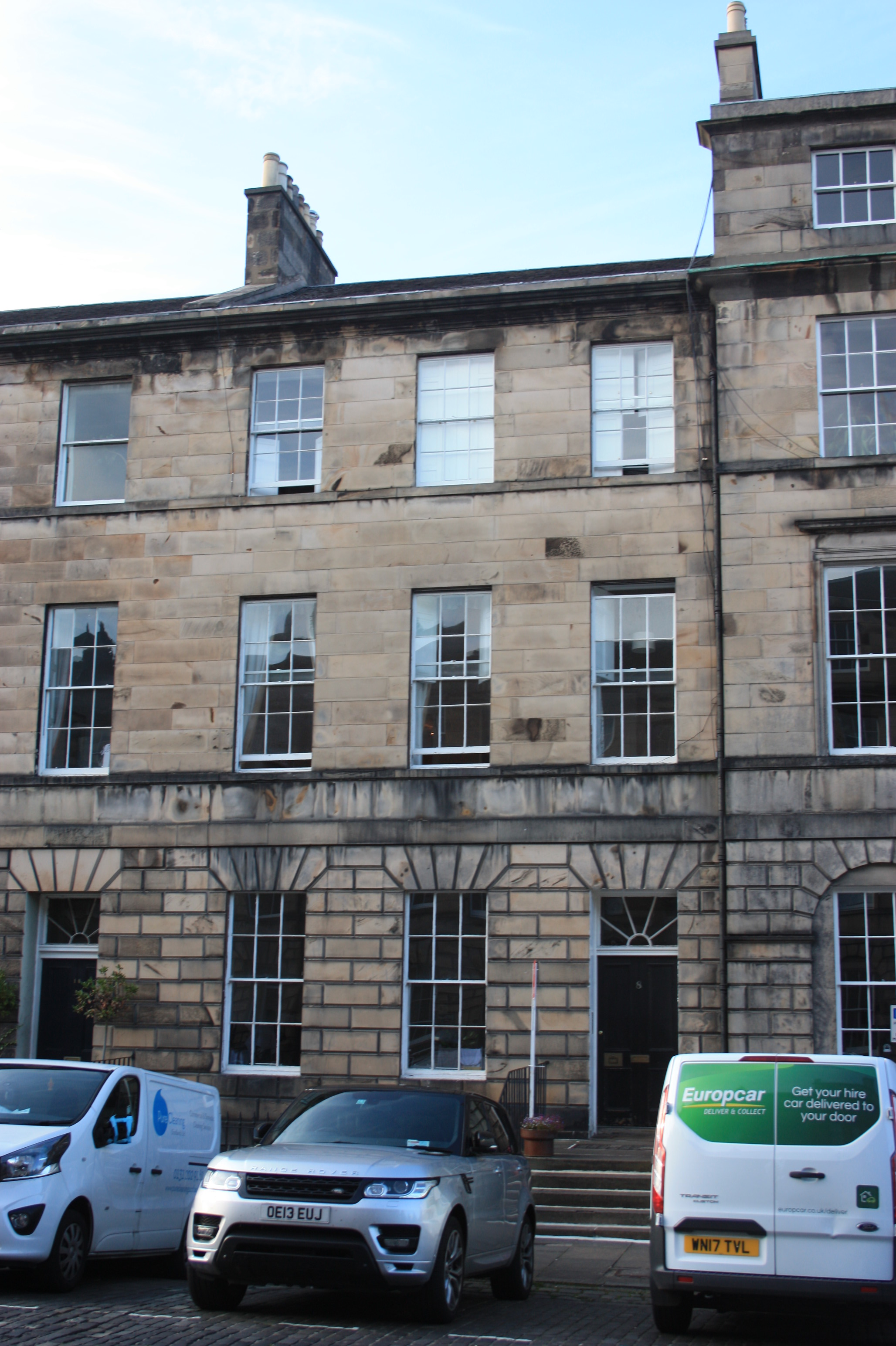
The Anderson family home at 8 Great King Street, Edinburgh

David Anderson, Lord St Vigeans (26 October 1862 – 1 June 1948) was a Scottish advocate and judge. He served from 1918 to 1934 as the second Chairman of the Scottish Land Court.

== Early life ==
Anderson was born on 26 October 1862. He was the son of Dr Joseph Anderson (1832–1916), an antiquarian who later served as keeper of the National Museum of Antiquities of Scotland from 1870 to 1913. His mother was Jessie Dempster.

== Career ==
Anderson was called to the Scottish bar in 1891. He was appointed as Sheriff of Dumfries and Galloway in March 1913, and in June 1913 he became a King's Counsel. In August 1917, he became Sheriff of Renfrew and Bute.

In May 1918 he relinquished the post as sheriff to become Chairman of the Scottish Land Court, taking the judicial title of Lord St Vigeans. The title was derived from the ancient village of St Vigeans in Forfarshire, where his father had been educated. He succeeded the deceased Lord Kennedy, having twice served as temporary Chairman during periods of Kennedy's absence, in July 1914 and December 1915.

After 16 years as Chairman, Anderson submitted his resignation from the Land Court in early October 1934, and retired from the bench on 1 November 1934. He was succeeded by Robert Macgregor Mitchell.

In June 1935 he was awarded an honorary doctorate of Law by the University of Edinburgh.

== Personal life ==
In 1898 Kennedy married Emma Millar Robertson, daughter of James Robertson of Edinburgh. They had one son, James, who was killed in a motorcycle accident in 1922.

== Death ==
Anderson died in Edinburgh on 1 June 1948, aged 85.

He is buried with his parents amongst the trees in the section north of the vaults in Warriston Cemetery.
