= Historical development of Scottish sheriffdoms =

A sheriffdom is a judicial district of Scotland. Originally identical to the Shires of Scotland, from the eighteenth century many counties were grouped to form "sheriffdoms".

By 1975 there were 12 sheriffdoms, with only Lanarkshire not grouped with another county. Following the abolition of the counties and formation of new local government areas in 1975 and 1996 the number of sheriffdoms has been reduced to six.

Shires originated in the twelfth century when the office of sheriff was introduced to Scotland. These shires eventually became the counties of Scotland. Malcolm III appears to have introduced sheriffs as part of a policy of replacing Gaelic forms of government with Norman feudal structures. This was continued by his sons Edgar, Alexander I and in particular David I. David completed the division of the country into sheriffdoms by the conversion of existing thanedoms.

== The ending of heritable jurisdictions ==
At the accession of George II in 1727 twenty-two sheriffs were hereditary, three were appointed for life and only eight held office at the pleasure of the monarch.

The heritable sheriffdoms were:

- Argyll
- Bute
- Banff
- Caithness
- Clackmannan
- Cromarty
- Dumbarton
- Dumfries
- Elgin
- Fife
- Kinross
- Kirkcudbright
- Linlithgow
- Nairn
- Orkney and Zetland
- Peebles
- Renfrew
- Roxburgh
- Selkirk
- Sutherland
- Stirling
- Wigtown

Those appointed for life were:

- Perth
- Forfar
- Ayr

Those held at pleasure were:

- Aberdeen
- Berwick
- Edinburgh
- Haddington
- Inverness
- Kincardine
- Lanark
- Ross

Following the unsuccessful Jacobite Rising of 1745 the Heritable Jurisdictions Act 1747 revested the government of the shires in the Crown, compensating those office holders who were displaced. The Sheriffs (Scotland) Act 1747 reduced the office of sheriff principal to a largely ceremonial one, with a sheriff depute or sheriff substitute appointed to each "county, shire or stewartry". The sheriff deputes, who were paid a salary by the Crown, were qualified advocates and took charge of sheriff courts. Where a sheriff depute was appointed to more than one county, he was aided by sheriff-substitutes.

== Combinations after 1747 ==
Shire	Combinations under the Sheriffs (Scotland) Act 1747	Combinations under the Sheriffs (Scotland) Act 1853	Combinations under the Sheriff Courts (Scotland) Act 1870	Combinations under the Administration of Justice (Scotland) Act 1933	Sheriffdom in 1975
Aberdeenshire	-		Aberdeen & Kincardine (1870); Aberdeen, Kincardine & Banff (1882)		Aberdeen, Kincardine & Banff
Argyll	Argyll & Bute (disunited 1776)	-		Renfrew & Argyll (1946)	Renfrew & Argyll
Ayrshire	-			Ayr & Bute (1946)	Ayr & Bute
Banffshire	-	Banff, Elgin & Nairn (1854)	Aberdeen, Kincardine & Banff (1882)		Aberdeen, Kincardine & Banff
Berwickshire	-	Haddington & Berwick (1856)	Roxburgh, Berwick & Selkirk (1872)		Roxburgh, Berwick & Selkirk
Buteshire	Argyll & Bute (disunited 1776)	Dumbarton & Bute (1854)	Renfrew & Bute (1871)	Ayr & Bute (1946)	Ayr & Bute
Caithness	Caithness & Sutherland; Disunited in 1806.	Sutherland & Caithness (1857)	Caithness, Orkney & Shetland (1870)	Caithness, Sutherland, Orkney & Zetland (1946)	Caithness, Sutherland, Orkney & Zetland
Clackmannanshire	Stirling & Clackmannan (disunited 1807); Clackmannan & Kinross (after 1807)	Linlithgow, Clackmannan & Kinross (1865)	Stirling, Dumbarton & Clackmannan (1881)		Stirling, Dumbarton & Clackmannan
Dumbartonshire	-	Dumbarton & Bute (1854)	Stirling & Dumbarton (1871); Stirling, Dumbarton & Clackmannan 1881)		Stirling, Dumbarton & Clackmannan
Dumfriesshire	-		Dumfries & Galloway (1874)		Dumfries & Galloway
Edinburgh/Midlothian	-		Midlothian and Haddington (1872); The Lothians (1881); The Lothians & Peebles (1883)		The Lothians & Peebles
Elgin/Moray	Elgin and Nairn	Banff, Elgin & Nairn (1854)	Inverness, Elgin & Nairn (1882)	Inverness, Moray, Nairn & Ross & Cromarty (1946)	Inverness, Moray, Nairn & Ross & Cromarty
Forfarshire/Angus	-			Perth & Angus (1934)	Perth & Angus
Haddingtonshire (East Lothian)	-	Haddington & Berwick (1856)	Midlothian and Haddington (1872); The Lothians (1881); The Lothians and Peebles (1883)		The Lothians & Peebles
Fife	Fife & Kinross (disunited 1807)	-	Fife & Kinross (1881)		Fife & Kinross
Inverness	-		Inverness, Elgin & Nairn (1882)	Inverness, Moray, Nairn & Ross & Cromarty (1946)	Inverness, Moray, Nairn & Ross & Cromarty
Kincardineshire	-		Aberdeen & Kincardine (1870); Aberdeen, Kincardine & Banff (1882)		Aberdeen, Kincardine & Banff
Kinross	Fife & Kinross (disunited 1807); Clackmannan & Kinross (after 1807)	Linlithgow, Clackmannan & Kinross (1865)	Fife & Kinross (1881)		Fife & Kinross
Stewartry of Kirkcudbright	-	Wigton & Kirkcudbright (1860)	Dumfries & Galloway (1874)		Dumfries & Galloway
Lanarkshire	-				Lanarkshire
Linlithgow/West Lothian	-	Linlithgow, Clackmannan & Kinross (1865)	The Lothians (1881); The Lothians & Peebles (1883)		The Lothians & Peebles
Nairn	Elgin and Nairn	Banff, Elgin & Nairn (1854)	Inverness, Elgin & Nairn (1882)	Inverness, Moray, Nairn & Ross & Cromarty (1946)	Inverness, Moray, Nairn & Ross & Cromarty
Orkney & Shetland/Zetland	Orkney and Shetland		Caithness, Orkney & Shetland (1870)	Caithness, Sutherland, Orkney & Zetland (1946)	Caithness, Sutherland, Orkney & Zetland
Peebles	-		The Lothians & Peebles (1883)		The Lothians & Peebles
Perthshire	-			Perth & Angus (1934)	Perth & Angus
Renfrewshire	-		Renfrew & Bute (1871)	Renfrew & Argyll (1946)	Renfrew & Argyll
Ross, Cromarty	Ross & Cromarty		Ross, Cromarty & Sutherland (1870)	Inverness, Moray, Nairn & Ross & Cromarty (1946)	Inverness, Moray, Nairn & Ross & Cromarty
Roxburghshire	-	Roxburgh & Selkirk (1868)	Roxburgh, Berwick & Selkirk (1872)		Roxburgh, Berwick & Selkirk
Selkirkshire	-	Roxburgh & Selkirk (1868)	Roxburgh, Berwick & Selkirk (1872)		Roxburgh, Berwick & Selkirk
Stirling	Stirling & Clackmannan (disunited 1807)	-	Stirling & Dumbarton (1871); Stirling, Dumbarton & Clackmannan (1881)		Stirling, Dumbarton & Clackmannan
Sutherland	Caithness & Sutherland; Disunited in 1806.	Sutherland & Caithness (1857)	Ross, Cromarty & Sutherland (1870)	Caithness, Sutherland, Orkney & Zetland (1946)	Caithness, Sutherland, Orkney & Zetland
Wigtownshire/Wigton	-	Wigton & Kirkcudbright (1860)	Dumfries & Galloway (1874)		Dumfries & Galloway

== Since 1975 ==
Since 1 January 1975 there have been six sheriffdoms, originally defined in reference to regions, districts and islands areas which were then to be created on 16 May 1975.

The sheriffdoms of Glasgow & Strathkelvin and South Strathclyde, Dumfries & Galloway were redefined with effect from 1 April 1996, when new local government areas were created.

The six current sheriffdoms are (with Sheriffs Courts in brackets):

- Glasgow and Strathkelvin - (Glasgow)
- Grampian, Highland and Islands - (Aberdeen - Banff - Elgin - Fort William - Inverness - Kirkwall - Lerwick - Lochmaddy - Peterhead - Portree - Stornoway - Tain - Wick)
- Lothian and Borders - ( Edinburgh - Jedburgh - Livingston - Selkirk)
- North Strathclyde - ( Campbeltown - Dumbarton - Dunoon - Greenock - Kilmarnock - Oban - Paisley)
- South Strathclyde, Dumfries and Galloway - (Airdrie - Ayr - Dumfries - Hamilton - Lanark - Stranraer)
- Tayside, Central and Fife - ( Alloa - Dundee - Dunfermline - Falkirk - Forfar - Kirkcaldy - Perth - Stirling)

== See also ==
- Shires of Scotland
- Sheriffdom
