= Sheriff of Sutherland =

The Sheriff of Sutherland was historically a royal appointment, held at pleasure, which carried the responsibility for enforcing justice in the sheriffdom of Sutherland, Scotland. It became a heritable post in the hands of the Earls of Sutherland until 1747, when it reverted, in combination with Caithness, to being a Royal appointment, usually for life.

From 1806 to 1857 the sheriffdom again existed in its own right, after which it was once again merged with Caithness.

== Sheriffs of Sutherland ==
- Family of the Earl of Sutherland, –1747
- 1747–1806 See Sheriff of Caithness and Sutherland
- George Cranstoun, Lord Corehouse, 1806–1819
- Charles Ross of Invercarron, 1819–1827
- Hugh Lumsden of Pitcaple, 1827–1857
- For sheriffs after 1857 see Sheriff of Caithness and Sutherland

== See also ==
- Historical development of Scottish sheriffdoms
