= Sheriff of Forres =

The Sheriff of Forres, was historically the royal official responsible for enforcing law and order in Forres, Scotland.

== Sheriffs of Forres ==
- Richard..... (1226)
- William Wiseman (1264)
- William de Dolays (1291)
- Alexander Wiseman (1305)
- Andrew..... (1337)
- John of Nairn (1414)
