= William Bisset =

- Arms of William Bisset; Azure, a bend argent, a label of five points in chief (Ragman Roll, 1296)
- Father: Robert Bisset
- Mother: Christiana

Sir William Bisset (William Byset/Bissett) was a knight, sheriff and constable in the 13th and 14th centuries.

William was the son of Robert Bisset of Upsettlington and Christiana. He swore fealty to King Edward I of England in 1296. Issued with a safe passage through England to return to Scotland, to prepare for the 1297 expedition to Flanders. While he was in Flanders, his castle of Upsettlington was sacked and destroyed. William fought on the side of the English in the Battle of Falkirk on the 22 July 1298, where the Scots were defeated. He was the Sheriff of Clackmannan between 1303-1304 and Sheriff of Stirling between 1304-1305 and Constable of Stirling Castle between 1305 and 1307 during the Wars of Scottish Independence, remaining loyal to King Edward I of England.

== Citations and references ==
Citations

References

- Watson, Fiona (2013). Under the Hammer: Edward I and Scotland, 1286-1307. Birlinn. ISBN 9781907909191.
- King, Andy; Simpkin, David (2012). England and Scotland at War, c.1296-c.1513. Brill. ISBN 9789004229839.
