= William Robertson Grieve, Lord Grieve =

Scottish law lord

William Robertson Grieve, Lord Grieve VRD (1917–2005) was a 20th-century Scottish lawyer who served as a Senator of the College of Justice.

== Life ==
He was born in Glasgow on 21 October 1917 the son of Dorothy Grieve (née Crichton). He never knew his father, Lt William Robertson Grieve, who served in the Highland Light Infantry and was killed in the Battle of Arras on 28 April 1917. He was from a relatively well off family, his grandfather having created the warehousing company W R Grieve Ltd.

He was educated at Glasgow Academy and Sedbergh School then studied Law at Glasgow University graduating MA in 1939. His career was interrupted by the Second World War during which he served as a Lt Commander in the RNVR.

He passed the Scottish bar as an advocate in 1947. He gained silk as a Queen's Counsel in 1957. He served as Sheriff of Renfrew and Argyll from 1964 to 1972. From 1969 to 1972 he was also Procurator of the Church of Scotland.

In June 1972 he was elected a Senator of the College of Justice under the title of Lord Grieve. He retired in 1988.

He died at the Western General Hospital, Edinburgh on 10 July 2005. His funeral service was held in St Cuthbert's Church, Edinburgh on 18 JUly 2005.

== Other Positions of Note ==
see

- Independent Chairman of the Fish Farming Advisory Body
- Chairman of the Governors of the Fettes Trust
- Chairman of the Governors of St Columba's Hospice
- Judge of the Court of Appeal for Jersey and Guernsey

== Family ==
In 1947 he married Lorna St John Benn (d.1989), daughter of Rear Admiral Edward Percy St John Benn. They had a son, Michael Grieve, and a daughter, Anne Grieve.
