= Neil Kennedy, Lord Kennedy =

Scottish advocate, legal academic and judge

The Honourable Lord Kennedy

Chairman of the Scottish Land Court
- In office 1912–1918
- Preceded by: None
- Succeeded by: Lord St Vigeans

Neil John Downie Kennedy, Lord Kennedy (1854 – 12 February 1918) was a Scottish advocate, legal academic and judge. He was a Professor of Law at the University of Aberdeen, and served from 1912 to 1918 as the first chairman of the Scottish Land Court.

== Early life and education ==
Kennedy was born in 1854 at Rosehall in Sutherland, the son of Rev John Downie Kennedy (1811-1873) and his wife Catherine Mackay. His father had been minister of Rosehall for the Church of Scotland since 1836 but at the Disruption of 1843 joined the Free Church of Scotland.

Neil was educated at Inverness and then at the University of Aberdeen, where he was awarded an MA in 1876. He later received an LL.D from the University of Edinburgh, in 1903.

== Career ==
He was called to the Scottish Bar in 1874 or 1877, and in 1898 he was appointed as lecturer on private international law at the University of Edinburgh. From 1901 to 1907 he was Professor of Civil and Scots Law at the University of Aberdeen.

His interest in the plight of crofters led him to be the Liberal Party candidate for Inverness-shire at the 1895 general election. He achieved a swing of 4.8% from the Conservatives, but fell 100 votes short of defeating the sitting Conservative MP James Evan Bruce Baillie.

He was a member of the Congested Districts Board, and in May 1906 he was appointed to the Royal Commission On Registration Of Title In Scotland.

Kennedy became a King's Counsel in October 1906. In January 1907, he became Sheriff of Renfrew and Bute.

In April 1908 he was appointed as a chairman of the Crofters' Commission, to fill the vacancy caused by the death of Sir David Brand.

=== Land Court ===
In March 1912, Kennedy was appointed as the first chairman of the Scottish Land Court, with the rank of a Lord of Session and the judicial title of Lord Kennedy.

The Land Court was established under the Small Landholders (Scotland) Act 1911. Some of its duties had been transferred from the Crofters Commission. The court regarded with great suspicion by landowners, because the 1911 Act had extended of security of tenure to tenant farmers in all of Scotland. This right had previously existed only in the seven crofting counties of Shetland, Orkney, Caithness, Sutherland, Ross-shire, Inverness-shire and Argyll, where it was created by the Crofters' Holdings (Scotland) Act 1886.

The landowners' hostility was reflected in the newspapers. In 1914 The Scotsman called it "the new tyrants of the countryside", and Blackwood's Magazine labelled it as the "Agrarian Star Chamber". The Court was also criticised by the Court of Session when it heard appeals, reproaching Kennedy's "rhetorical indulgence". In March 1914, the Conservative MP John Pretyman Newman was rebuked by the Speaker for asking in the House of Commons "Does Lord Kennedy act in his judicial capacity, or is he merely a tool of the Radical party?"

== Personal life ==
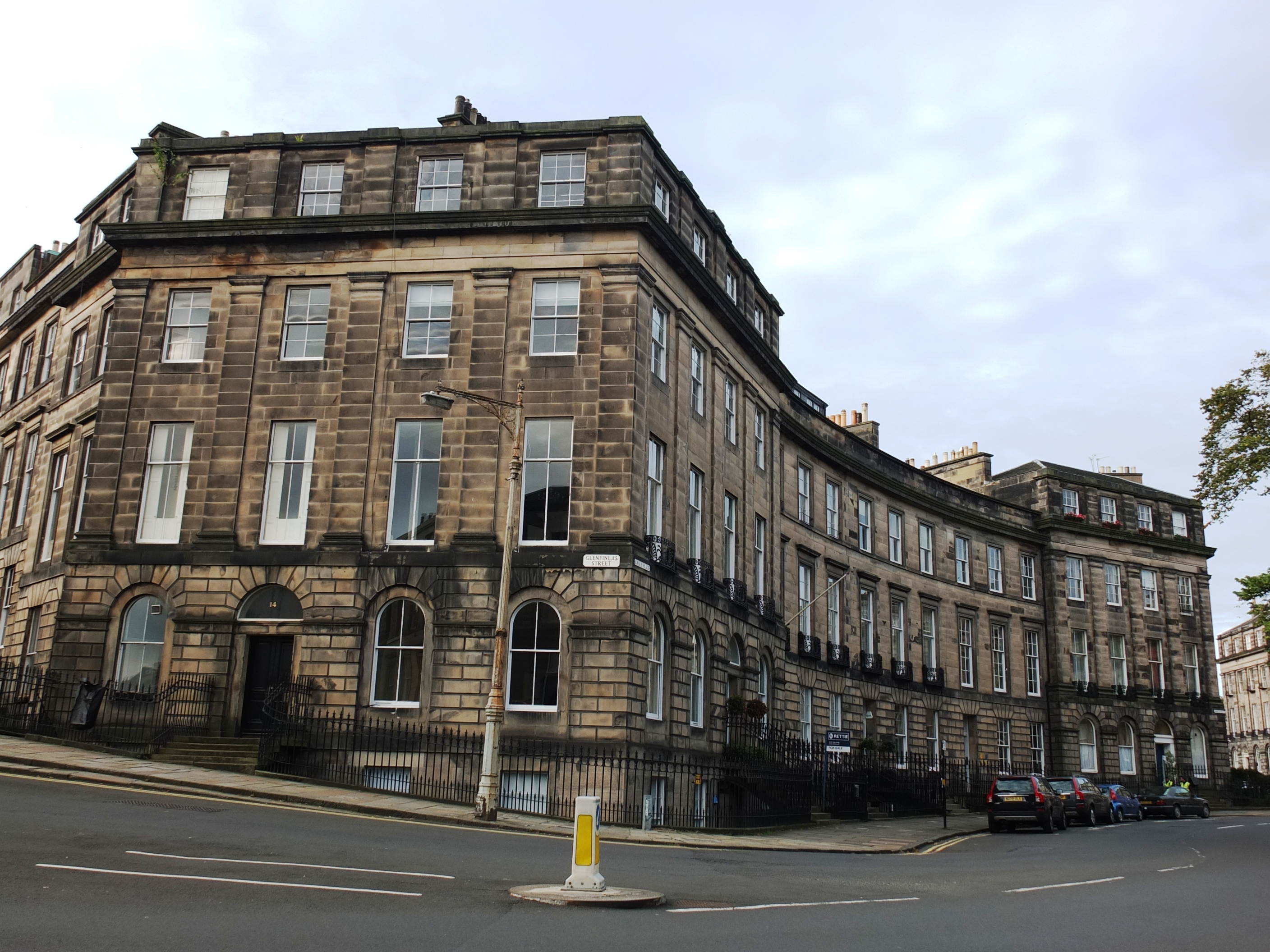
Ainslie Place in Edinburgh

In April 1902, Kennedy married his cousin Hilda Stevenson at St Mary's Church, Hendon in Middlesex.

== Death ==
Kennedy died on 12 February 1918, at his home at 22 Ainslie Place on the Moray Estate in west Edinburgh. He was 63 years old. His funeral was held in Edinburgh on 15 February, at the United Free Church in Queen Street. His body was then taken to Glasgow for cremation.

He was described by The Scotsman as "one of the most brilliant and learned men of his generation at the bar".
