= Andrew Jameson, Lord Ardwall =

Scottish advocate and judge (1845–1911)

Andrew Jameson, Lord Ardwall (5 July 1845 – 21 November 1911) was a Scottish Advocate and Judge. He is the subject of a 1913 biography by John Buchan.

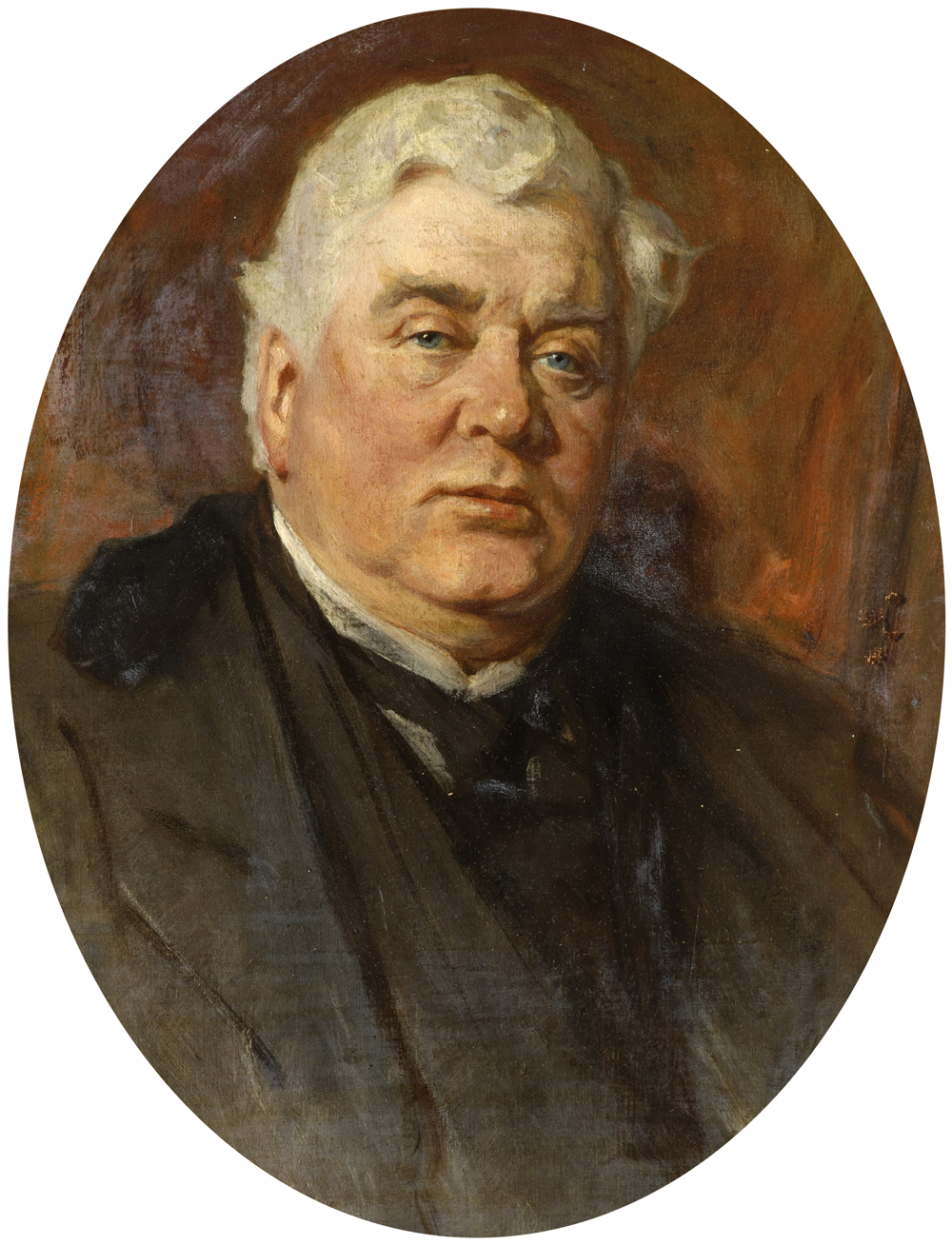
Andrew Jameson, Lord Ardwall

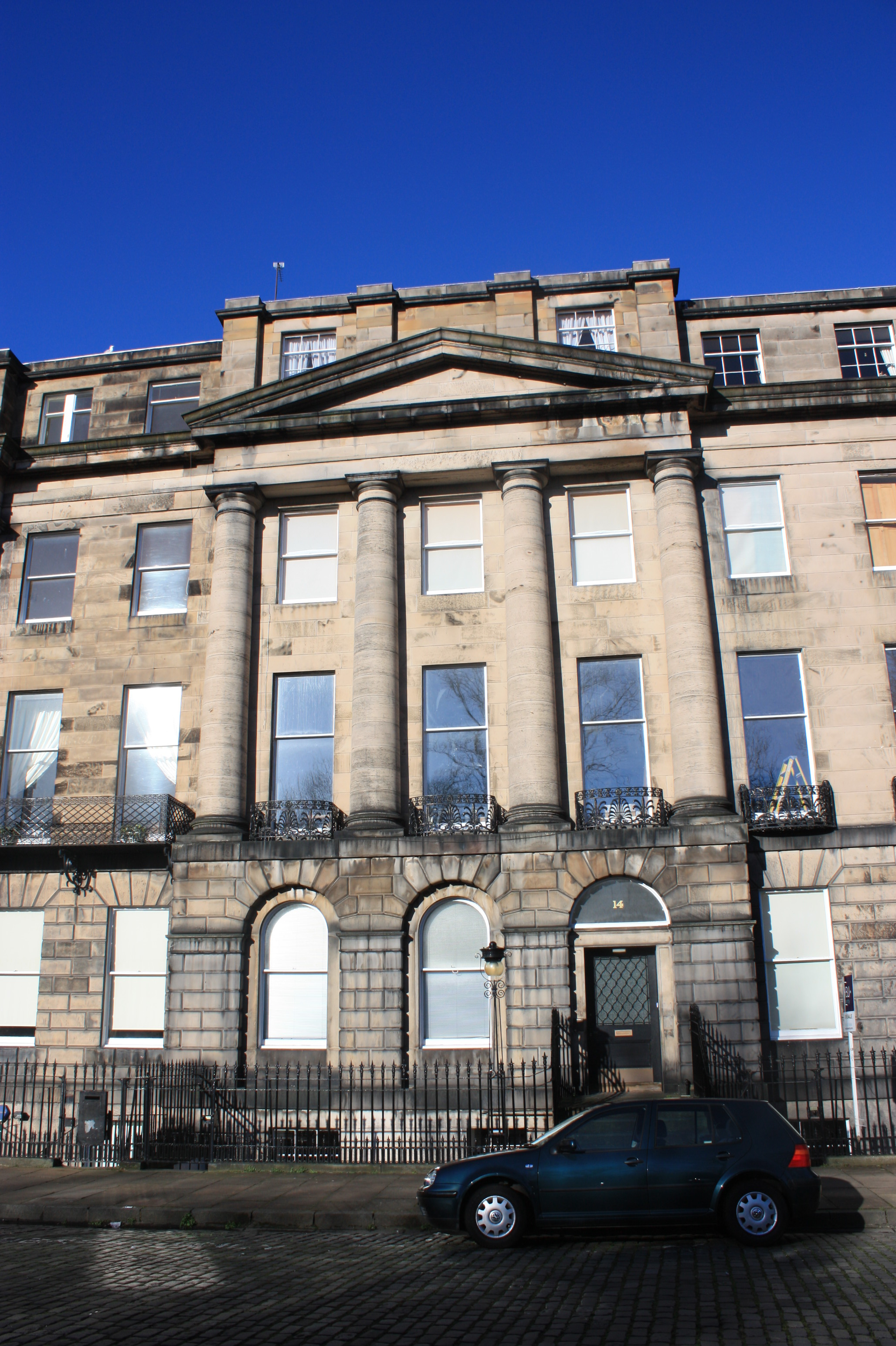
Lord Ardwall's impressive Edinburgh townhouse at 14 Moray Place

== Life ==
Born at Ayr on 5 July 1845, he was eldest son of Alexandra, daughter of Alexander Colquhoun Campbell of Barnhill, Dunbartonshire and her husband, Andrew Jameson, sheriff of Aberdeen. Educated at Edinburgh Academy, he graduated with an MA from the University of St Andrews in 1865. He then attended the University of Edinburgh, and on 19 May 1870 he passed at the Scottish bar, where he gradually built up a practice.

In 1882 Jameson was appointed junior counsel to the department of woods and forests. On 27 April 1886 he was made sheriff of Roxburgh, Berwick and Selkirk. Having taken part in politics as a Liberal Unionist, he received from Lord Salisbury's government in 1890 the office of sheriff of Ross, Cromarty and Sutherland on 28 November 1890, and became sheriff of Perthshire on 27 October 1891.

On the resignation of Henry Moncreiff, 2nd Baron Moncreiff, Jameson was raised to the bench, on 6 January 1905, with the title of Lord Ardwall. In the same year he was made an honorary LLD of the University of St Andrews. After an illness of about six months he died, at 14 Moray Place, Edinburgh, on 21 November 1911, and was buried at Anwoth in Kirkcudbrightshire.

== Interests ==
Jameson conducted inquiries on behalf of the government, acted as an arbiter in industrial disputes, and was for some years, in succession to Lord James of Hereford, chairman of the board of conciliation, between the coalowners and Scottish Miners' Federation. As a member of the Free Church of Scotland, he supported Robert Rainy in promoting its union with the United Presbyterians (1900), though he had opposed Rainy during the agitation for disestablishing the Church of Scotland. During the later part of his career he paid attention to agriculture.

== Family ==
In 1875 Jameson married Christian, daughter of John Gordon Brown of Lochanhead and niece of Walter McCulloch of Ardwall in Kirkcudbrightshire, from whom she inherited the estate after which the judge took his title. They had one daughter and three sons, the eldest, Andrew, and youngest of whom entered the army. The second, John Gordon Jameson, advocate, unsuccessfully contested the 1912 Edinburgh East by-election, as a Unionist.

== Notes ==
Attribution

This article incorporates text from a publication now in the public domain: Stephen, Leslie, ed. (1885). "Jameson, Andrew". Dictionary of National Biography. Vol. 2. London: Smith, Elder & Co.
