= John Charles Fenton =

Scottish lawyer (1880-1951)

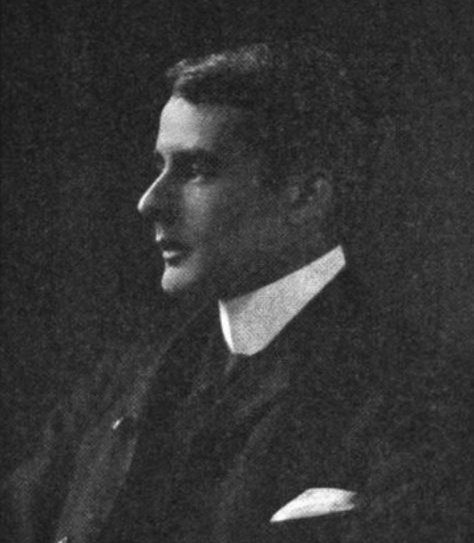
- Born: 5 May 1880
- Died: 3 January 1951 (aged 70); Edinburgh, Scotland
- Education: George Watson's College; University of Edinburgh; Sorbonne
- Occupation: Lawyer

Sir John Charles Fenton KC (5 May 1880 – 3 January 1951) was a Scottish lawyer.

== Biography ==
Fenton was born 5 May 1880, the son of Elizabeth Jack and James Fenton of Edinburgh. He was educated at George Watson's College, at the University of Edinburgh and at the Sorbonne, in Paris.

He was admitted as a member of the Faculty of Advocates in 1904. After service in World War I, he was appointed a King's Counsel in 1923 and from February to November 1924 he was Solicitor General for Scotland in the first Labour Government in the UK. He was later Sheriff of Fife and Kinross from 1926 to 1937, of Stirling, Dumbarton, and Clackmannan from 1937 to 1942, and the Lothians and Peebles. and Sheriff of Chancery in Scotland from 1942.

He was knighted in the 1945 Birthday Honours.

He died in Edinburgh on 3 January 1951.

Legal offices
Preceded by Frederick Thomson	Solicitor General for Scotland; 1924	Succeeded by David Fleming
