= Sheriff Principal of North Strathclyde =

The Sheriff Principal of North Strathclyde is the head of the judicial system of the sheriffdom of North Strathclyde, one of the six sheriffdoms covering Scotland. The sheriffdom employs a number of legally-qualified sheriffs who are responsible for the hearing of cases in seven Sheriff Courts based in Campbeltown, Dumbarton, Dunoon, Greenock, Kilmarnock, Oban and Paisley. The current Scottish sheriffdoms were created in 1975 when the previous arrangement of 12 sheriffdoms was discontinued.

The Sheriff Principal is appointed by the King on the recommendation of the First Minister of Scotland, who receives recommendations from the Judicial Appointments Board for Scotland. He or she must have been qualified as an advocate or solicitor for at least ten years and is responsible for the administrative oversight of the judicial system within the sheriffdom. The Sheriff Principal will also hear appeals against the judgement of his sheriffs, hear certain cases himself and occasionally conduct major fatal accident inquiries.

== Sheriffs Principal of North Strathclyde ==
- 1975–1978: Frederick William Fitzgerald O'Brien, QC (Sheriff Principal of Lothian and Borders, 1978–1989)
- 1978–1980: John Alexander Dick, QC (Sheriff Principal of Glasgow and Strathkelvin, 1980–1986)
- 1980–1983: ?
- 1983–1989: Philip Isaac Caplan, QC
- 1989–1998: Robert Colquhoun Hay
- 1999–2014: Bruce A. Kerr, QC
- 2014–June 2023 Duncan Law Murray
- June 2023 – present Sean Murphy KC

== See also ==
- Historical development of Scottish sheriffdoms
