= Helen D'Arcy Stewart =

Scottish poet (1765–1838)

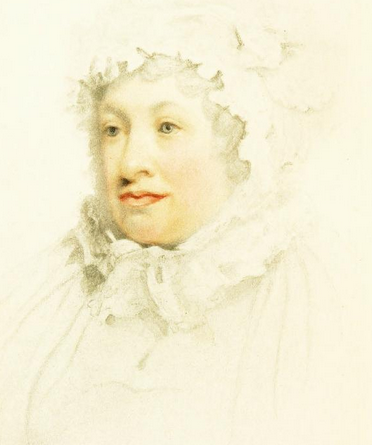
Helen D'Arcy Stewart in a circa 1830 watercolour by William Nicholson R.S.A. (1781–1844)

Helen D'Arcy Stewart (née Cranstoun; 13 March 1765 – 28 July 1838) was a Scottish poet and a noted Edinburgh society hostess of the late 18th and early 19th century, as wife to Dugald Stewart, an influential Scottish philosopher and mathematician best known for popularizing the Scottish Enlightenment.

== Biography ==
Helen D'Arcy Stewart was born on 13 March 1765, and was the third daughter of the Hon. George Cranstoun, and sister of George Cranstoun, Lord Corehouse, and of Jane Ann, later Countess Purgstall, both intimate friends of Sir Walter Scott. Her mother was Maria, daughter of Thomas Brisbane, of Brisbane in Ayrshire.

As a girl she seems to have attracted notice by the charm of her manner and the brilliancy of her mind. She was devoted to poetry, and wrote verses which were praised by people of literary distinction who were strangers to her. It was said of her poems that they "must remind every friend who knew her of her graceful taste and sensibility, of her quick perception of humour, of her playful wit."

It was out of her poetry that her marriage to Dugald Stewart is said to have been due. One of her poems was shown by her cousin, Lord Lothian, to Mr. Stewart, who was at that time his private tutor. The philosopher was sufficiently engaged by the poem to make an acquaintance with Helen, leading to their marriage on 26 July 1790, the age of the bride being twenty-five, and that of the bridegroom thirty-seven. The marriage was a perfectly happy one on both sides. The young wife doted on her reserved philosopher husband. He, who had the highest opinion of his wife's judgement, submitted all his writings to her. She was his habitual and confidential companion during his studies, and he never considered a piece of his composition to be finished until she had reviewed it. He himself said that, although she did not probably understand the abstract points of his philosophy so well as he did himself, yet when he had once made out a truth into an intelligible shape, she helped him to illustrate it "by a play of fancy and of feeling which could only come from a woman's mind."

In character, she was free from the slightest tinge of pedantry; there was no display of learning in her conversation. In one of his letters to the Bishop of Llandaff, Lord Dudley says of her: "She has as much knowledge, understanding, and wit as would set up three foreign ladies as first-rate talkers in their respective drawing-rooms, but she is almost as desirous to conceal as they are to display their talents." A woman endowed with such gifts and charm naturally attracted a large circle of devoted friends, and as the wife of Dugald Stewart, whose literary reputation, after his marriage, soon rose to the highest rank, she was able to make her house in Edinburgh the resort of all those who were best worth knowing in the Scottish metropolis when it was really a metropolis of intellectual power. Hers was the house to which strangers most eagerly sought introduction, and it has been said that, when at the zenith of her life, it may be doubted if a person departing from Scotland could have carried a stronger recommendation into the intellectual world of England or America than a letter of introduction from Mrs. Dugald Stewart.

A sixteen-year-old John Ward, later 1st Earl of Dudley, stayed with the Stewart family for an extended period in 1797–8, and correspondence from Dudley to Helen Stewart is collected in Letters to "Ivy" From The First Earl of Dudley (1905).

Helen Stewart died at Warriston House, Edinburgh, on 28 July 1838. Her character is summed up, in an obituary notice in the Edinburgh Evening Courant of 9 August 1838: "To the last she was remarkable for a winning gentleness of manner — a meekness more impressive than austerity — by which, during her whole life, she had exercised greater influence on those around her than others could do by an assumption of dignity."

== Family ==
Dugald Stewart and Helen had a son, George, who died in 1809, and a daughter Maria d'Arcy, who died unmarried in 1846.

== Works ==
Little of Helen Stewart's work is published. Her poem The tears I shed must ever fall was noted by Robert Burns, who recommended it a "song of genius" and supplied the initial four lines for the final stanza. It, and others, are published in Johnson's Scots Musical Museum Vol iv, 1792. Her obituary in the Gentleman's Magazine states that "She holds a high place amongst the authors of Scottish song".
