= George Cranstoun, Lord Corehouse =

Scottish advocate, judge and satirist

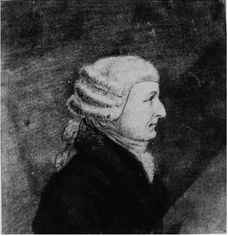
George Cranstoun, Lord Corehouse.

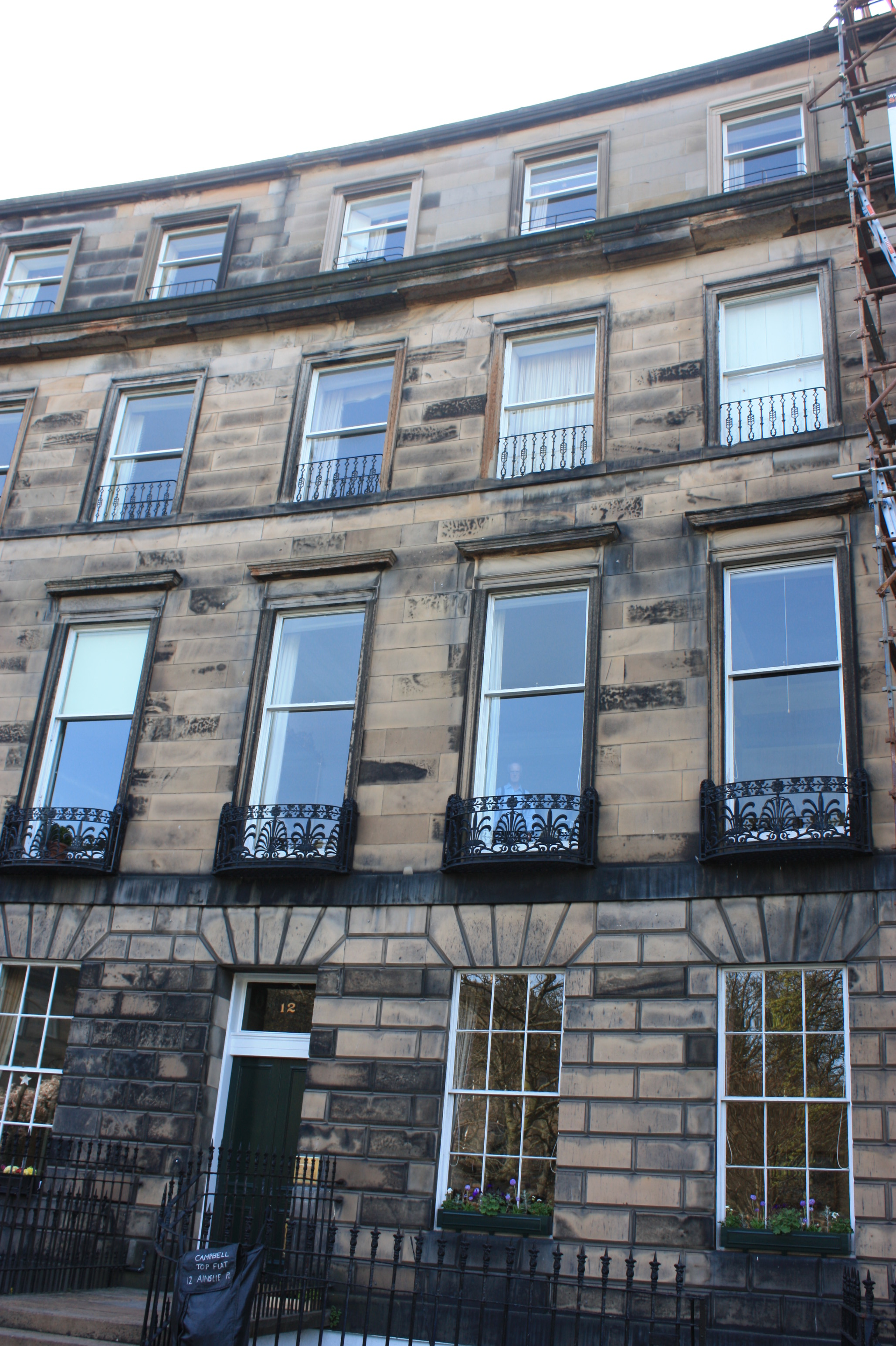
12 Ainslie Place, Edinburgh, Cranstoun's fashionable Edinburgh townhouse

George Cranstoun, Lord Corehouse (28 November 1770 – 26 June 1850) was a Scottish advocate, judge and satirist.

== Life ==
Cranstoun was likely born at his father's estate, Longwarton. He was baptised in Ancrum, Roxburghshire, Scotland, the second son of the Hon. George Cranstoun of Longwarton, seventh son of William Cranstoun, 5th Lord Cranstoun, and Maria, daughter of Thomas Brisbane of Brisbane, Ayrshire. He was originally intended for a military career, however was admitted to the Faculty of Advocates on 2 February 1793, was appointed a depute-advocate in 1805, and sheriff-depute of Sutherland in 1806.

He was chosen dean of the Faculty of Advocates on 15 November 1823, and was raised to the bench on the death of Lord Hermand in 1826, under the title of Lord Corehouse, from his residence Corehouse near the fall of Corra Linn on the River Clyde.

In 1832–3 Lord Corehouse is listed as living at 12 Ainslie Place on the Moray Estate in Edinburgh's fashionable west end.

In January 1839, while apparently in perfect health, he was suddenly struck with paralysis, which compelled him to retire. He died 26 June 1850.

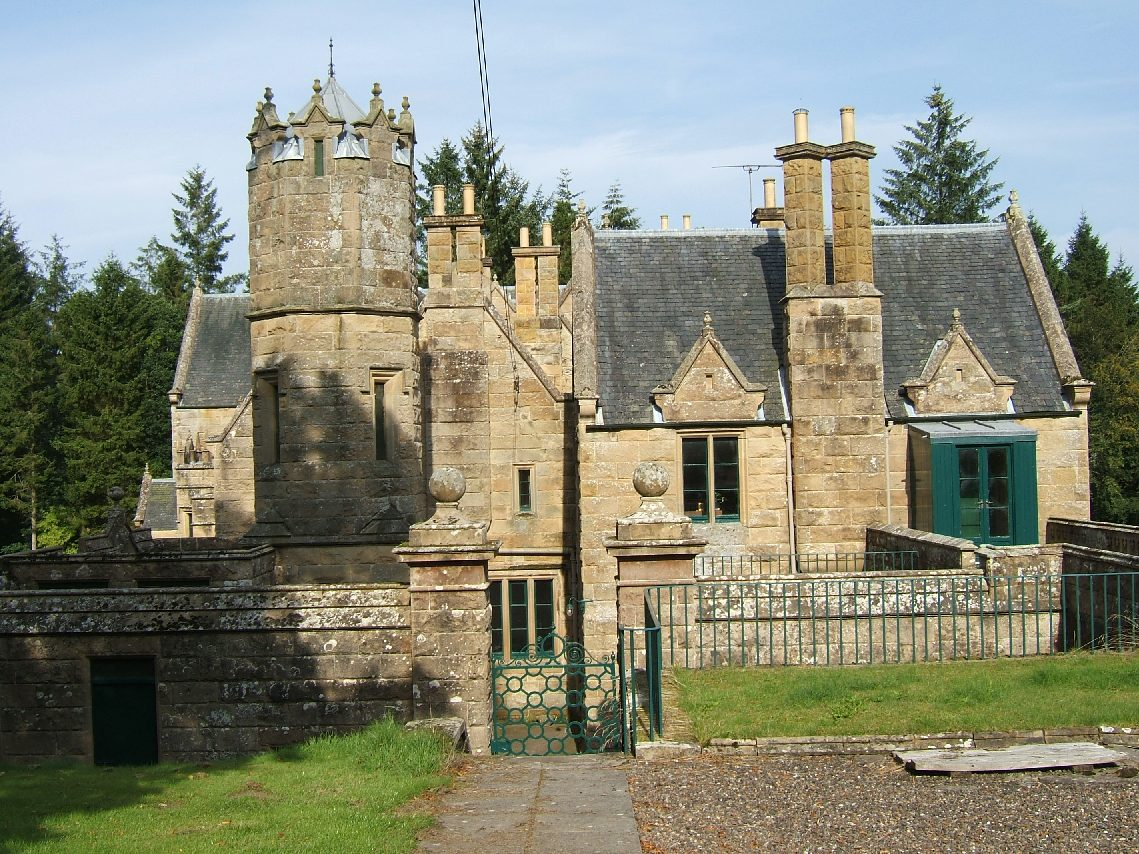
Corehouse, the Lanarkshire house from which George Cranstoun took his legal title.

== Associations and works ==
His accomplishments as a Greek scholar secured him the friendship of Lord Monboddo. While attending the civil law class in 1788 Cranstoun met Walter Scott, and a friendship continued through life. Scott read the opening stanzas of the Lay of the Last Minstrel to William Erskine and Cranstoun. While practising at the bar Cranstoun wrote a satire, 'The Diamond Beetle Case,’ in which he caricatured the manner and style of several of the judges in delivering their opinions.

== Family ==
His second sister, Jane Anne, afterwards Countess of Purgstall, was a correspondent of Walter Scott; his youngest sister, Helen D'Arcy, was a noted poet and hostess in Edinburgh and was the wife of philosopher Dugald Stewart.
