= Sheriff of Selkirk =

The Sheriff of Selkirk was historically a royal official responsible for enforcing justice in Selkirk, Scotland. Prior to 1748 most sheriffdoms were held on a hereditary basis. From that date, following the Jacobite uprising of 1745, the hereditary sheriffs were replaced by salaried sheriff-deputes, qualified advocates who were members of the Scottish Bar.

Following mergers of the Scottish sheriffdoms in 1868 the position became the Sheriff of Roxburgh and Selkirk.

== Sheriffs of Selkirk ==
- Andrew Sinton (c.1214)
- Alexander Sinton (1265)
- Andrew Sinton
- Alexander Synton (-1293)
- Andrew Synton (1293-)
- Hugh of Eyland (1296)
- Isabella Synton (1305)
- Aymer de Valence, Earl of Pembroke (1306)
- Edward Keith (1328)
- Robert de Manners (1334)
- William de Montacute (1335)
- John Turnbull (1360)
  - John Turnbull (1364) - Deputy
- Thomas Erskyne (1373)
- Thomas Erskine (1469)
- John Murray (1503)

Sheriffs-Depute

- George Sinclair, Lord Woodall, –1751
- Andrew Pringle, 1751–1755
- Andrew Plummer, 1785-1799
- Walter Scott, 1799–1832
- Thomas Hamilton Miller, 1832–1843
- James Miller, 1843-
- George Dundas, 1844–>1861
- For sheriffs after 1868 see Sheriff of Roxburgh and Selkirk.

== See also ==
- Historical development of Scottish sheriffdoms
