= James Ivory, Lord Ivory =

Scottish judge (1792 – 1866)

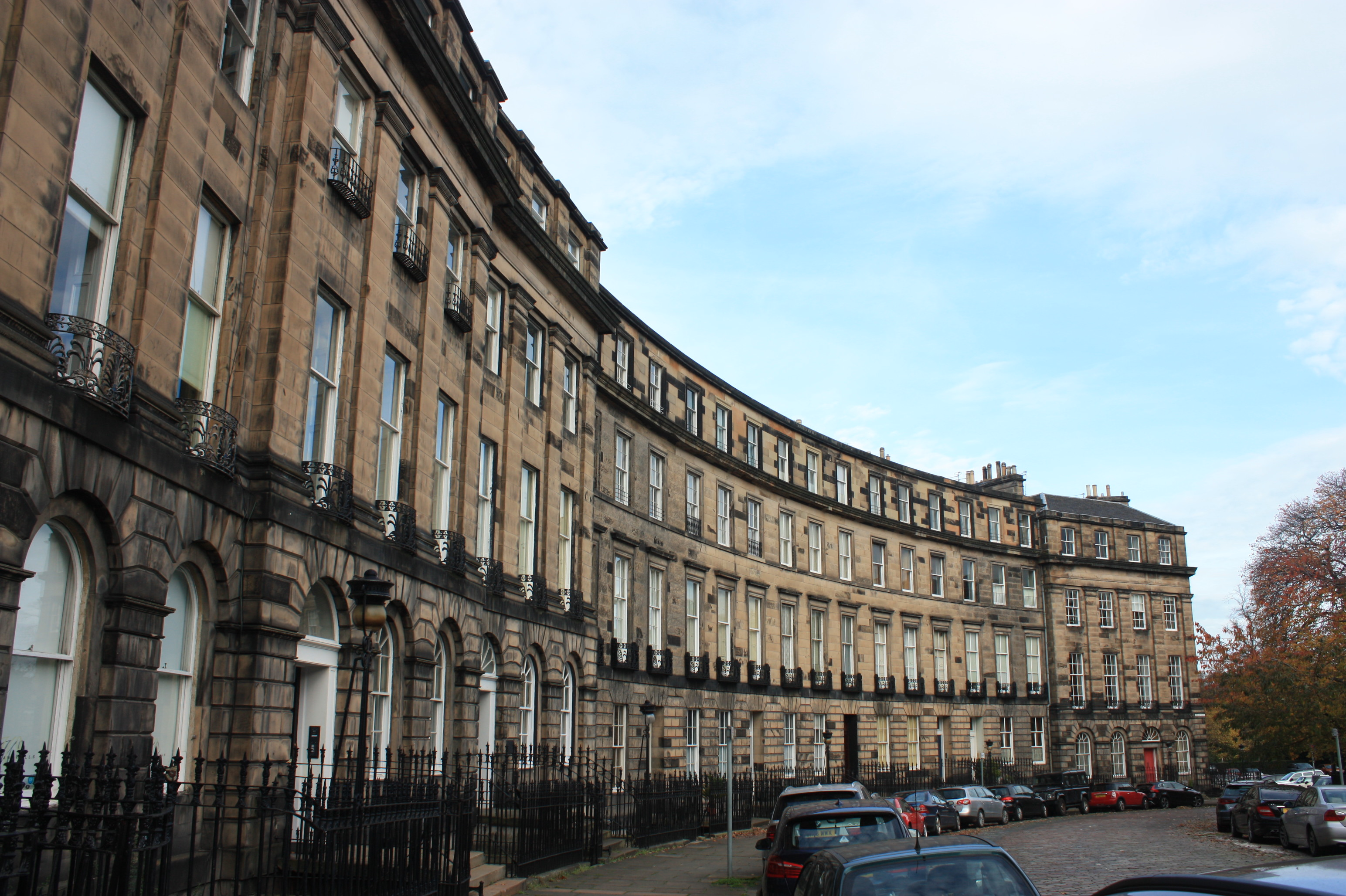
Ivory lived at Ainslie Place in Edinburgh

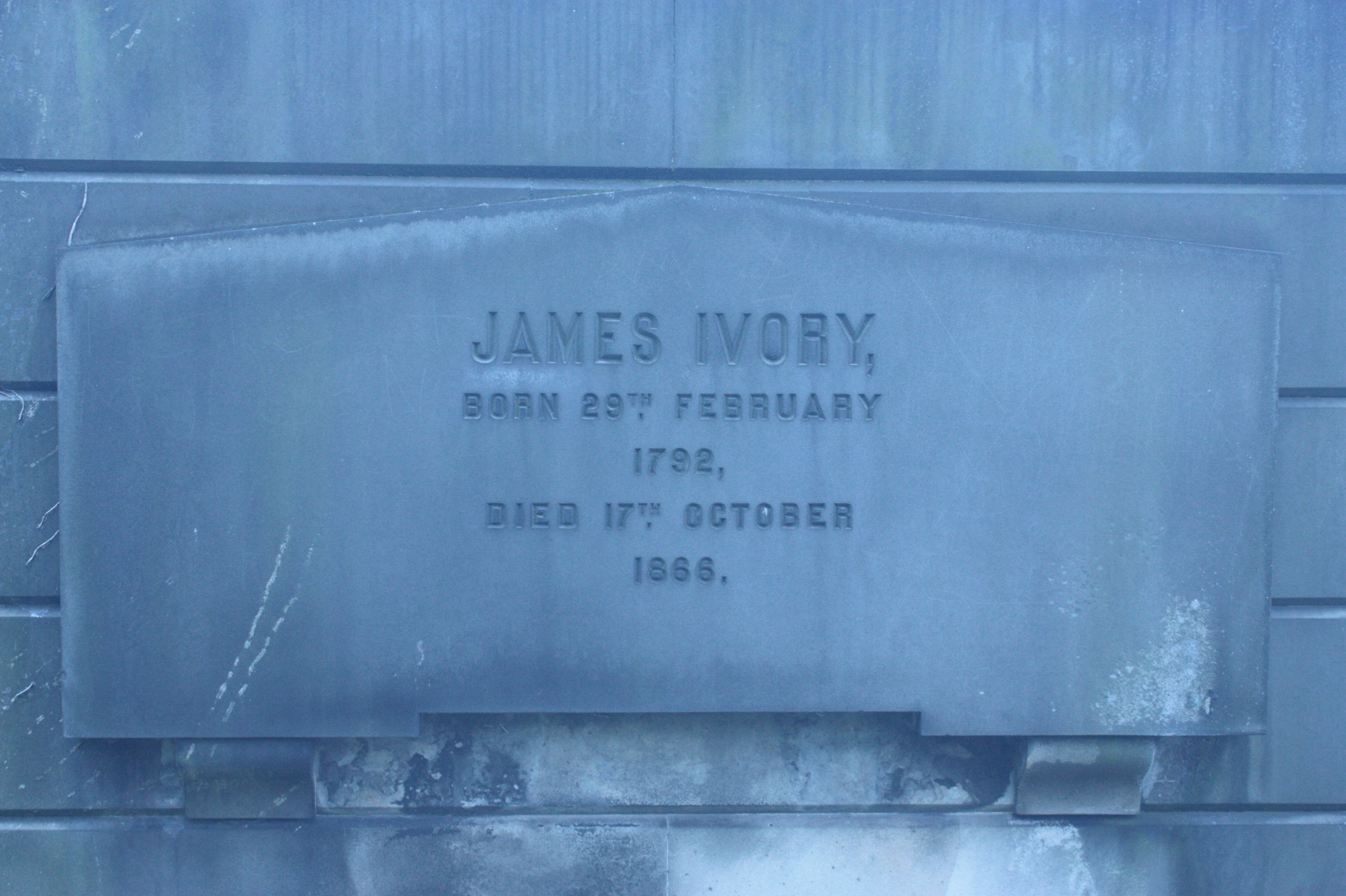
grave of Lord Ivory, New Calton Cemetery

James Ivory, Lord Ivory FRSE (1792 – 1866), was a Scottish judge.

== Life ==
The son of Thomas Ivory, watchmaker and engraver, he was born in Dundee on 29 February 1792. His family lived and ran a business from the High Street in DundeeSir James Ivory the mathematician was his uncle, and James Ivory, the watchmaker was his grandfather.

After attending Dundee Academy he studied for the legal profession at the University of Edinburgh was admitted as a member of the Faculty of Advocates in 1810, and in that year was enrolled as a burgess of Dundee. When, in 1819, the select committee of the House of Commons was engaged in making inquiries into the state of the Scottish burghs, Ivory was examined with reference to the municipal condition of Dundee, and strongly advocated for the abolition of self-election, which was then prevalent in the town councils of Scotland, and continued in force until 1833.

Ivory was chosen as advocate depute by Francis Jeffrey, Lord Advocate, in 1830; three years later he was appointed Sheriff of Caithness, and in 1834 was transferred to a similar office in Buteshire, from which he resigned in 1838. He was Solicitor General for Scotland under Lord Melbourne's ministry in 1839, was made a Lord Ordinary of Session the following year, and sat as judge in the Court of Exchequer.

In 1839 he was appointed a Deputy Lieutenant of the County of the City of Edinburgh.

In 1848 he was elected a Fellow of the Royal Society of Edinburgh. His proposer was James Russell.

In 1849 he was appointed a lord of justiciary (taking the title of Lord Ivory), and served both in the Court of Session and the High Court of Justiciary until his retirement in October 1862. For several years before that date he was the senior judge of both courts.

As a lawyer Ivory was distinguished by the subtlety of his reasoning, his minuteness of detail, and profound erudition. He was not a fluent orator, but in the early part of his career, when legal argument was conducted in writing, he obtained a high reputation.

Ivory died at his Edinburgh home of 9 Ainslie Place on 18 October 1866. He is buried in New Calton Cemetery in its north-west section.

== Family ==
In 1817 he married Ann Laurie (d.1869), a daughter of Alexander Lawrie, deputy gazette writer for Scotland. His fourth son, William Ivory, was sheriff of Inverness-shire. Another son Francis Jeffery Ivory (presumably named after Lord Advocate Francis Jeffrey) migrated to Queensland, Australia where he became a Member of both the Queensland Legislative Assembly and the Queensland Legislative Council.

Legal offices
Preceded by Andrew Rutherfurd	Solicitor General for Scotland; 1839-1840	Succeeded by Thomas Maitland
