= Robert Handyside, Lord Handyside =

Scottish lawyer and judge (1798–1858)

Robert Handyside, Lord Handyside FRSE (1798–1858) was a Scottish lawyer and judge who served as Solicitor General for Scotland and a Lord of Session.

== Life ==
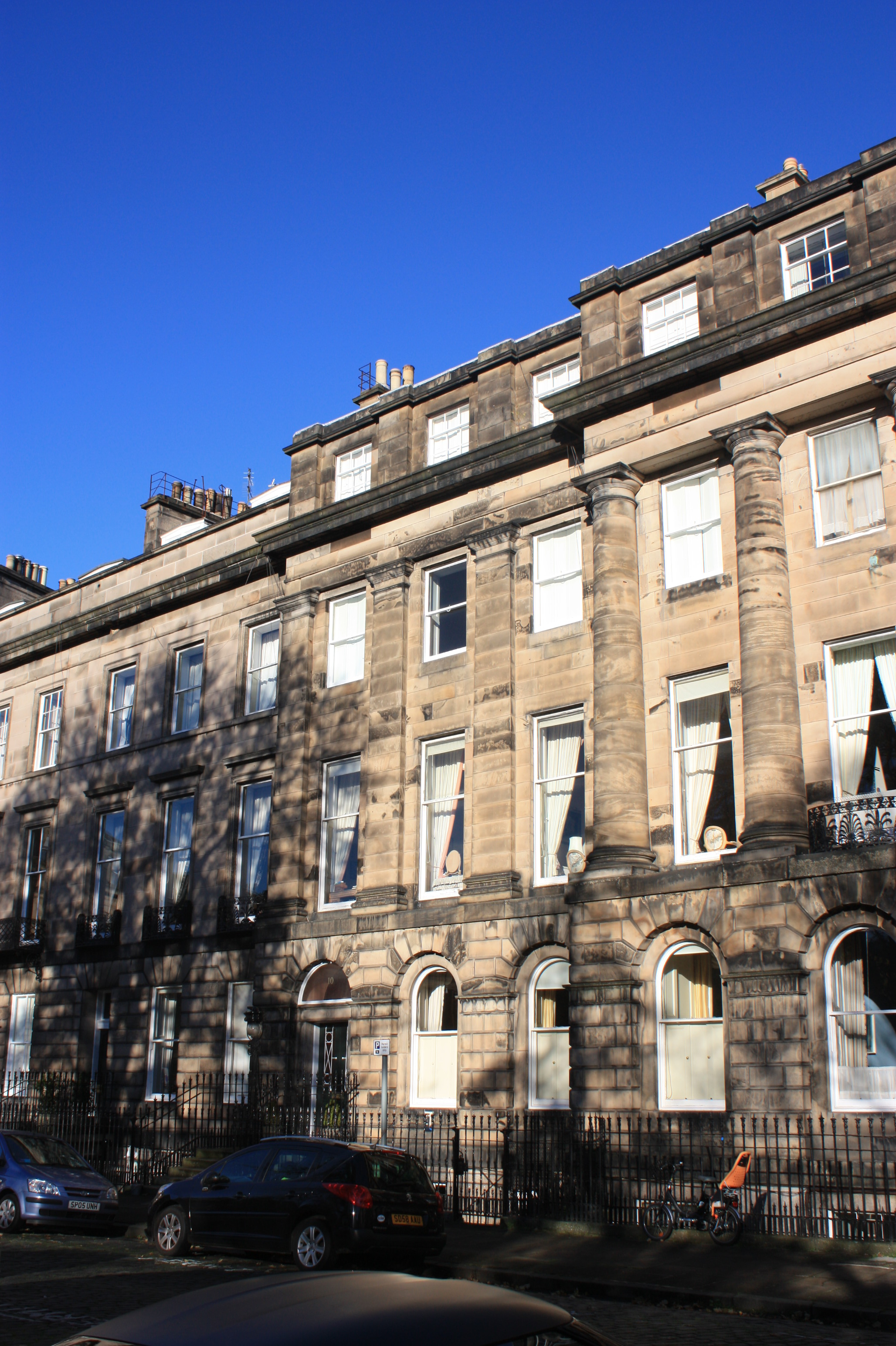
10 Moray Place, Edinburgh

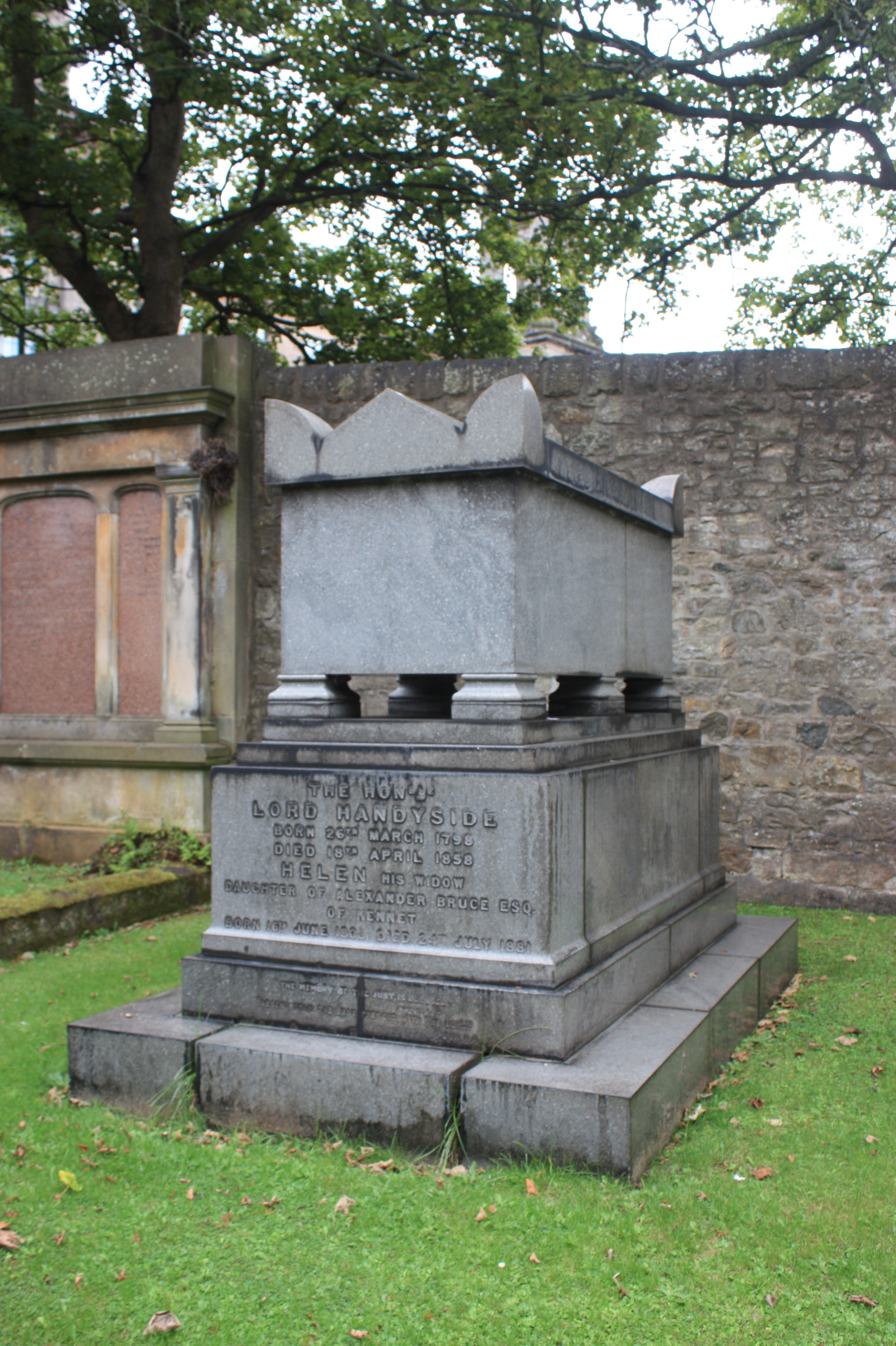
The grave of Robert Handyside, Dean Cemetery

He was born at 46 South Hanover Street in Edinburgh’s New Town on 26 March 1798, the son of Jane Cuninghame and William Handyside WS (1746–1818), a lawyer. His younger brother was Peter David Handyside. He studied law at the University of Edinburgh and was made an advocate in 1822.

He served as Sheriff of Stirlingshire from 1840. In 1847 he was elected a Fellow of the Royal Society of Edinburgh his proposer being John Fleming. In 1853 he succeeded Charles Neaves, Lord Neaves as Solicitor General for Scotland and also became a Lord of Session.

In 1857 he was one of the several judges presiding in the trial of Madeleine Smith.

Through his uncle he inherited the estate of Pencloe in Ayrshire. Through his father-in-law he also inherited the estate of Kennet, Clackmannanshire.

In Edinburgh he lived in a large townhouse at 10 Moray Place, on the Moray Estate.

He died at Kennet House on 17 April 1858.

== Family ==
He married Helen Balfour Bruce daughter of Alexander Bruce 9th of Kennet. Dying childless, his estates passed back to relatives in the Bruce family after his death.
