= Sheriff of Angus =

The Sheriff of Angus (alternatively the Sheriff of Forfar) was historically the royal official responsible for enforcing law and order in Angus, Scotland and bringing criminals to justice.

Prior to 1748 most sheriffdoms were held on a hereditary basis. From that date, following the Jacobite uprising of 1745, they were replaced by salaried sheriff-deputes, qualified advocates who were members of the Scottish Bar.

After the merger of sheriffdoms in 1934 the post became that of the Sheriff of Perth and Angus.

== Sheriffs of Forfar ==
- William de Monte Alto
- William Comyn, Lord of Badenoch (1195-1211)
- Hugh Cameron (1214-1219)
- Thomas Malherb (1227)
- John Fenton (1261)
- Robert de Monte Alto (Mowat) (1261-1264)
- William de Monte Alto (Mowat) (1264)
- John Fenton (1266)
- Matthew le Chen (1272)
- Alexander de Lamberton
- David de Bethune (1290)
- Henry de Prestoun (1304)
- John de Pollock (1305)
- William de Airth (1305)
- John de Traquair (1328)
- Robert Ramsay (1340)
- John Octerlony (1342)
- Robert Ramsay (1359)
- Malcolm Ramsay (1365)
- Walter Ogilvy of Auchterhouse (-1391)
  - Duncan Lighton - 1391 - Deputy
- Alexander Ogilvy (1400)
- Patrick Ogilvy (1428)
  - Walter Ogilvy (1434)
- Alexander Ogilvy of Auchterhouse (1454)
  - Thomas Fenton - 1454 - Deputy
- David Guthrie, (1457–)
- David Lindsay, 5th Earl of Crawford (1474)
  - Alexander Lindsay - 1483 - Deputy
  - John Ramsay of Teling (1497)
- Patrick Gray, 4th Lord Gray, 1541–?1584 (died 1584)
- Patrick Maule of Panmure (1632)

Sheriffs-Depute (1748)

- George Broun, 1748–1753
- John Campbell of Stonefield (Lord Stonefield), 1753–
- Patrick Chalmers, 1769–1807
- Adam Duff, 1807–1819
- James L'Amy, 1819–1854
- Alexander Currie, 1854
- Alexander Stuart Logan 1854-1862
- Frederick Lewis Maitland Heriot, 1862–1881
- John Comrie Thomson, 1885–1898
- Henry Johnston, 1898–1905
- James Ferguson KC, 1905–1917
- John Mckie Lees KB KC, 1917–1923
- Alexander Munro MacRobert KC, 1923–1924
- Sir George Morton, 1924–1932
- Daniel Patterson Blades, 1932–1934
- For sheriffs after 1934 see Sheriff of Perth and Angus.

== See also ==
- Historical development of Scottish sheriffdoms
