= William Wiseman (sheriff of Elgin) =

Scottish nobleman, sheriff and soldier (died 1346)

William Wiseman (died 17 October 1346), Sheriff of Elgin (1304–1305) was a 13th-14th century Scottish nobleman. He was a soldier during the First War of Scottish Independence.

== Life ==
William did homage to King Edward I of England at Elgin in 1295 and again at St Andrews in 1304. In 1305, he was appointed as the Sheriff of Elgin. William was stripped of his appointment, privileges and lands for supporting Robert the Bruce (Robert I) in his attempt to take the Scottish throne. He was able to escape the rout at the Battle of Methven on 19 June 1306. His wife was captured along with Robert I's wife Elizabeth de Burgh by William II, Earl of Ross, an adherent of the deposed Scottish King John Balliol and Edward I, when Kildrummy Castle was taken. William was part of the forces of Sir James Douglas during the Battle of the Pass of Brander. William captured Skelbo Castle on 7 April 1308, and then went onto renew the siege of Elgin Castle, held by the English. Willam was not able to capture Elgin, as John Moubray relieved the castle garrison. William attended the March 1309 Parliament at St. Andrew's and was a signatory to The Letter from the Magnates of Scotland to King Philip IV of France.

Sir William Wiseman was killed during the Battle of Neville's Cross in Durham, England on 17 October 1346 when the invading Scottish army of King David II of Scotland was defeated by the defending English forces.

== William Wiseman Ancestry et. el. ==
- POMS.ac.uk 4/5/1(Moray Reg., no.39) - 1237 - Land transaction between Andrew Bishop of Moray and The Maison Dieu of Elgin - Witness Thomas Wiseman Sheriff of Elgin and Andrew Wiseman Serviens to the Bishop of Moray.
- 2 February 1247 - Charter regarding Vicarages - Witness Thomas Wiseman Sheriff of Elgin.
- POMS.ac.uk 4/38/12(APS,i,99-100)- 27 August 1261 - Inquest - Juror Thomas Wiseman Sheriff of Elgin
- POMS.ac.uk 4/20/44(NLS, Adv, MS 29.4.2(x),231r-231v)- April 1262 - Agreement between Kinloss Abbey and Thomas Wiseman Sheriff of Elgin, son of William Wiseman, to hold feudeme from the Abbot and Convent of Kinloss for all of their lands in the Parish of Dundurous for 100 shillings per annum paid half at Pentecost and half at Martinmas.
- POMS.ac.uk 4/38/15(APS,i,101) Inquest - 27 November 1262 - Jurors Thomas Wiseman (Thomam Wisman) Grieve of Elgin and William Wiseman (Willelmum Wisman) Sheriff of Forres
- Scotland's Places - The Castle of Forres - "In 1264 William Wiseman Sheriff of Forres disbursed the sum of £10 for building a new tower beyond the Kings Chamber at which time ten hogsheads of wine were put into its cellers"
- 1305 At the same time William Wiseman was appointed Sheriff of Elgin, Alexander Wiseman was appointed Sheriff of Forres and Nairn.

== Notes ==
William Wiseman is celebrated in the poem "The Brus" by John Barbour, in the section recording The Battle beneath Ben Cruachan,( Book 10 line 46 ) " And Wylyam Wysman a good Knycht"
