= William Baillie, Lord Polkemmet =

Scottish lawyer and judge

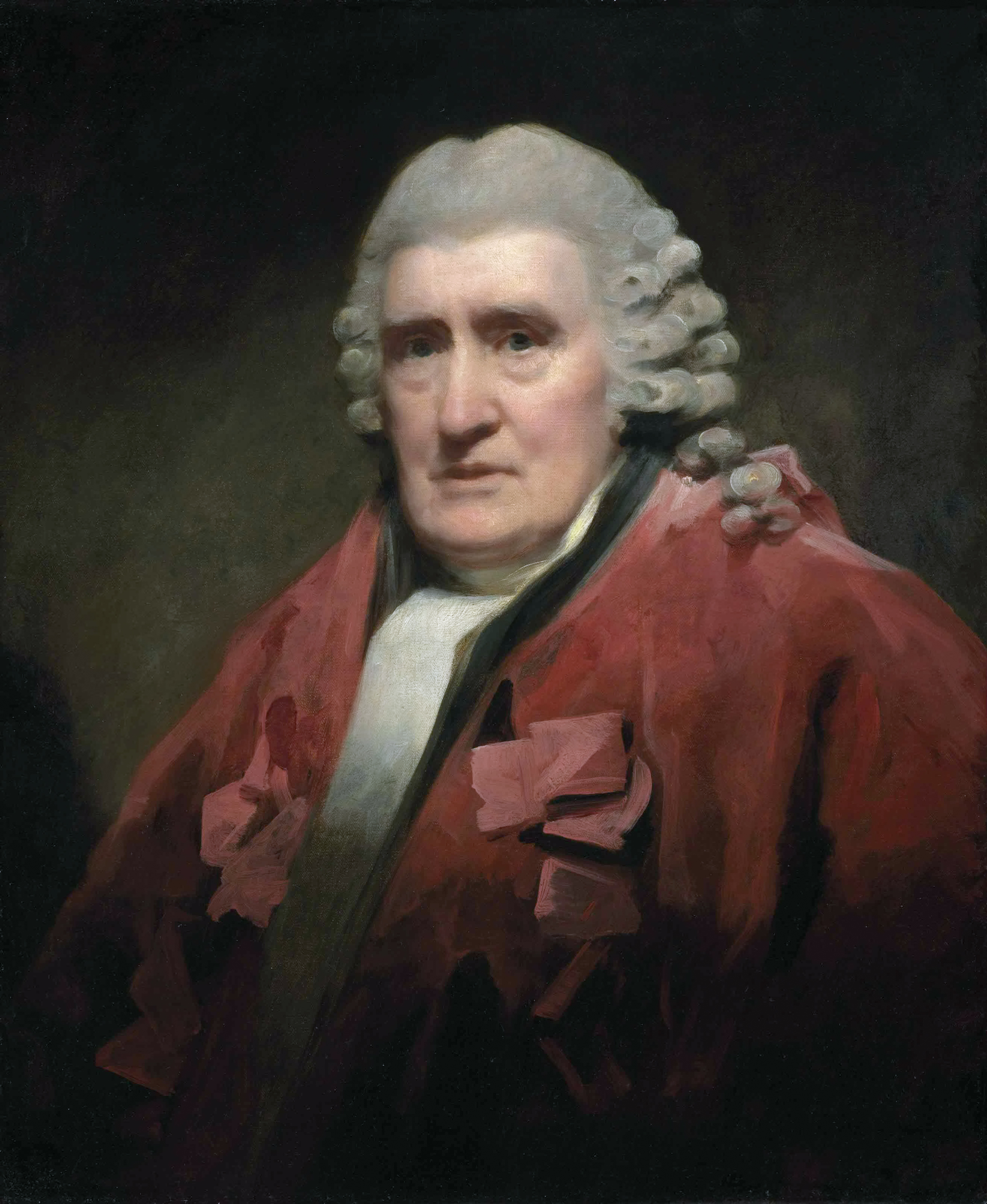
William Baillie, Lord Polkemmet (Henry Raeburn)

William Baillie, Lord Polkemmet (1736 – 14 March 1816) was a Scottish lawyer and judge.

== Life ==
Baillie was the eldest son of Thomas Baillie of Polkemmet WS (died 1785), and Isabel Walker (died 1777).

He was admitted advocate in 1758. He was appointed Sheriff of Linlithgow, serving from 1772 to 1793. On 14 November 1793 he was created a Senator of the College of Justice with the title Lord Polkemmet, a post he retained until retiring in 1811. His position on the Senate was filled by Robert Craigie, Lord Craigie.

His Edinburgh address was 62 George Street.

Baillie was the Grand Master of the Royal Order of Scotland of Freemasonry from 1776 to 1778.

He died 14 March 1816.

== Family ==
He married Margaret Culquhoun, daughter of Sir James Culquhoun of Luss in 1768. In 1803 he married again, to Janet Sinclair, sister of Sir John Sinclair, and a cousin to his first wife.

The Baillie baronets were descended from Lord Polkemmet.
