= Reginald le Chen (died 1312) =

Scottish noble (c.1235–1312)

Sir Reginald le Chen or Cheyne (c.1235–1312) was a 13th-14th century Scottish noble. He was a sheriff of Nairn, sheriff of Inverness and Baron of Inverugie.

Reginald was the son of Sir Reginald le Chen (d.1293) and an unknown daughter of John Comyn of Buchan. He was the Sheriff of Inverness in 1297.

In 1305, it was recorded that Reginald received a grant from King Edward I of England of 200 oaks from the royal forests of Longmorn and Darnaway "to build his manor of Dufhous" (Duffus Castle).

Sir Reginald Le Chen died before November 1312.

== Family ==
He married Mary in c.1269, daughter of Freskin de Moray of Duffus and of Strabok and lady Johanna de Strathnaver.

Almost nothing is recorded about Johanna except in a single charter, which makes clear that she had come to control those lands in the far northwest which Harald Eiriksson's family had wrested from the jarldom of Orkney. The charter is clear that Joanna had control of this territory - strathnaver - independently of the Jarl, and of Sutherland. Peculiarly, Joanna donated the territory, in some sense, to Elgin Cathedral, only for the cathedral to rent it back to Reginald for a bi-annual fee; mysteriously, the charter does not explain why this transaction arose. As Reginald's descendants eventually became Earls of Sutherland, this ultimately led to an intimate connection between Strathnaver and Sutherland, with which it is now merged.

Reginald had the following known issue:

- Reginald of Inverugie and Duffus, married Helen, daughter of Malise, Earl of Strathearn and Joan de Mentieth.
- Francis of Straloch, married Isabel, daughter of John Comyn, Earl of Buchan and Isabella MacDuff.
- Elena, married William de Moubray.
- Unknown daughter, probably Beatrix (b.c.1266), married Andrew Fraser of Touch Fraser and Cowie.
