= Sheriff of Renfrew and Argyll =

The Sheriff of Renfrew and Argyll was historically the royal official responsible for enforcing law and order and bringing criminals to justice in Renfrew and Argyll, Scotland.

Prior to 1748, most sheriffdoms were held on a hereditary basis. From that date, following the Jacobite uprising of 1745, hereditary sheriffs were replaced by salaried sheriff-deputes, qualified advocates who were members of the Scottish Bar.

The sheriffdom of Renfrew was combined with the sheriffdom of Bute in 1871, creating the new position of Sheriff of Bute and Renfrew. In 1946, it was merged with the sheriffdom of Argyll, creating the position of Sheriff of Renfrew and Argyll. That sheriffdom was dissolved in 1975 and replaced by the current sheriffdom of North Strathclyde.

== Sheriffs of Renfrew ==
- Sir William Semple, 1471–
- Thomas Sempill (killed 1488)
- John Sempill, 1st Lord Sempill (1489) (killed 1513)
- William Sempill, 2nd Lord Sempill (1515) (died 1552)
- Robert Sempill, 3rd Lord Sempill (died 1576)
- John Sempill, 1st of Beltrees (died 1579)
- James Sempill, 2nd of Beltrees (died 1626)
- Alexander, Earl of Eglinton, 1636- (died 1661)
- Francis Sempill
- Earls of Eglinton, –1748

Sheriffs-Depute

- William Fleming of Barochan 1542
- Charles Macdonald of Crichen, 1748-
- Charles McDowall, c.1786
- Allan Maconochie, Lord Meadowbank of Kirknewton, 1788–1796
- John Connel, 1796–c.1814
- John Colin Dunlop, 1816–1842
- Hercules Robertson, 1842–1853
- Robert MacFarlane, 1853–1862
- Patrick Fraser, 1864–1871

== Sheriffs of Renfrew and Bute (1871) ==
- Henry James Moncrieff, 1881-1888
- Sir Charles Pearson, 1888–1889 (Sheriff of Perth, 1889–90)
- Sir John Cheyne, 1889–1907
- Neil John Downie Kennedy, 1907–1912
- John Wilson, 1912–1917
- Alastair Oswald Morison Mackenzie, January–July 1917 (Sheriff of Lanark, 1917)
- David Anderson, 1917–1918
- Charles Murray, 1918–1918
- James Mercer Irvine, 1918–1945

== Sheriffs of Renfrew and Argyll (1946) ==
- Thomas Murray-Taylor, 1946–1948
- James Randall Philip, QC, 1948–1955 {Sheriff of Perth and Angus, 1955}
- William Ross McLean, QC, 1955–1960 (Sheriff of the Lothians and Peebles, 1960)
- Ian Shearer, Lord Avonside, QC, 1960–1962
- Alexander Thomson, 1962–1964
- William Robertson Grieve, Lord Grieve, QC, 1964–1972
- James Mackay, 1972–1974
- The sheriffdom was abolished in 1975 and replaced by the current Sheriffdom of North Strathclyde.

== See also ==
- Historical development of Scottish sheriffdoms
