= Sheriff of the Lothians and Peebles =

The Sheriff of the Lothians and Peebles was historically the office responsible for enforcing law and order and bringing criminals to justice in The Lothians and Peebles, Scotland. Prior to 1748 most sheriffdoms were held on a hereditary basis. From that date, following the Jacobite uprising of 1745, the hereditary sheriffs were replaced by salaried sheriff-deputes, qualified advocates who were members of the Scottish Bar.

The position of Sheriff of the Lothians had been created in 1881 following a merger of the sheriffdom of Midlothian and Haddington with the Linlithgow part of the sheriffdom of Linlithgow, Clackmannan & Kinross. The position of Sheriff of Peebles was then joined to it in 1883 to create the new position of Sheriff of the Lothians & Peebles.

This latter sheriffdom was replaced in 1975 by the current sheriffdom of Lothian and Borders.

== Sherriffs of Lothian ==
- Alexander Fairlie of Braid, 1594

== Sheriffs of Peebles ==
- Gilbert Fraser, 1259
- Aymer de Maxwell, 1262
- Simon Fraser of Oliver, 1266-1291
- William of Durham, 1302
- Aymer de Valence, 2nd Earl of Pembroke, 1306
- Patrick Fleming of Biggar, 1327 - 1346
- Adam Lockhart, 1357
- Lawrence of Govan, 1359
- Thomas Hay, 1373
  - Walter Tweedy, 1373 - Deputy
- William Hay, 1388
  - Adam Dickson, 1388 - Deputy
- Patrick Fleming of Bord 1397
- John Hay, 1st Lord Hay of Yester, 1464–1509
- David Hay, 1470
  - Thomas Hay, 1470 - Deputy
- Malcolm Fleming, 3rd Lord Fleming 1531-1540
- William Douglas, 2nd Earl of March, 1724–1747
- James Veitch of Elliock, 1747–

Sheriffs-Depute

- James Montgomery, 1748–?1760
- Alexander Murray of Murrayfield, 1761–1775
- James Wolf Murray, 1789–1811
- James Wedderburn, 1811–1816
- Andrew Clephane, 1816–>1825
- John Wood, c.1835–1840
- George Napier, 1840-1883

== Sheriffs of the Lothians and Peebles (1883) ==
- James Arthur Crichton, 1885–1891
- Alexander Blair, 1891–1896
- Andrew Rutherford, 1896–1904
- Charles Cornelius Maconochie, 1904-1918
- Gerard Lake Crole, KC, 1918–1927
- Charles Herbert Brown, KC, 1927–c.1937
- John Charles Fenton, 1942–1951
- James Albert Gilchrist, QC, 1953–
- William Ross McLean, QC, 1960–
- Gerald Paisley Sinclair Shaw, 1965–
- William James Bryden, 1973–1975 (Sheriff Principal of Lothian and Borders, 1975)
- After 1975 the sheriffdom was merged into the new sheriffdom of Lothian and Borders.

== See also ==
- Historical development of Scottish sheriffdoms
