= Sheriff Principal of Grampian, Highland and Islands =

The Sheriff Principal of Grampian, Highland and Islands is the head of the judicial system of the sheriffdom of Grampian, Highland and Islands, one of the six sheriffdoms covering the whole of Scotland. The sheriffdom employs a number of legally qualified sheriffs who are responsible for the hearing of cases in thirteen Sheriffs Courts based in Aberdeen, Banff, Elgin, Fort William, Inverness, Kirkwall, Lerwick, Lochmaddy, Peterhead, Portree, Stornoway, Tain and Wick. The current Scottish sheriffdoms were created in 1975 when the previous arrangement of 12 sheriffdoms was discontinued.

The Sheriff Principal, usually a King's Counsel (KC), is appointed by the King on the recommendation of the First Minister, who receives recommendations from the Judicial Appointments Board for Scotland. The sheriff must have been qualified as an advocate or solicitor for at least ten years and is responsible for the administrative oversight of the judicial system within the sheriffdom. The Sheriff Principal will also hear appeals against the judgement of his sheriffs, hear certain cases himself and occasionally conduct major fatal accident inquiries.

== Sheriffs Principal of Grampian, Highland and Islands ==
- 1975–1982: George Stanley Gimson
- 1983–1988: Stewart E. Bell, QC
- 1988–1993: Ronald Ireland QC
- 1993–2001: Douglas James Risk
- 2001–2012: Sir Stephen Young, Bt QC
- 2013–2025 : Derek C.W. Pyle
- 21 June 2025-28 February 2026: Eilidh McDonald (Temporary Sheriff Principal)
- 1 March 2026-present: Andrew Miller

== See also ==
- Historical development of Scottish sheriffdoms
