= Sheriff of Stirling =

The Sheriff of Stirling was historically the office responsible for enforcing law and order in Stirling, Scotland and bringing criminals to justice. Prior to 1748 most sheriffdoms were held on a hereditary basis. From that date, following the Jacobite uprising of 1745, the hereditary sheriffs were replaced by salaried sheriff-deputes, qualified advocates who were members of the Scottish Bar.

Following mergers of the Scottish sheriffdoms the office became the Sheriff of Stirling & Dumbarton in 1871 and the Sheriff of Stirling, Dumbarton & Clackmannan in 1881.

The sheriffdom was dissolved in 1975 when the current sheriffdoms of North Strathclyde and Tayside, Central and Fife were created.

== Sheriffs of Stirling ==
- William Fitz Thorald (c.1130)
- Dufoter (1153)
- William de Stirling (1165)
- Gilbert de Stirling (1170)
- Alexander de Stirling (1189, 1195–1198, 1219)
- Muireadhach II, Earl of Menteith (1226)
- John de Stirling (1230)
- Bernard Fraser (1226-1233)
- Alexander de Stirling (1235)
- John de Stirling (1241)
- Gilbert Fraser (1258)
- John Lamberton (1265-1266)
- Patrick de Graham (1288-1289)
- Andrew Fraser (1291-1293)
- David Grant (1295-1296)
- Richard Waldgrave (1296)
- Alexander Livingstone (1304)
- William Bisset (1304-1305)
- Alexander Fraser (1328)
  - Richard Lachlan - 1328 - Deputy
- Richard Lachlan (1329)
- Robert Erskine (1360)
- Andrew Murray (1367)
- Thomas Erskine (1367)
- Walter Oliphant (1368)
- Thomas, Earl of Mar (1368)
- Robert de Normanville (1373)
- John Stewart (1407)
- John Seton, 2nd Lord Seton (1436)
- Malcolm Fleming of Monycabock (1470-1471)
  - Alexander Bruce - 1470 - Deputy
- Janes Schaw of Sanchie (1473)
- Alexander Seton (1488)

== Sheriffs-Depute of Stirling and Clackmannan (1748) ==
- David Walker, 1748–1761
- Robert Bruce, 1761–1764
- George Cockburn (later Haldane), 1764–1770
- Alexander Abercromby, Lord Abercromby, 1770–1780
- John Pringle, 1780–1790
- William Tait, 1790–1797
- David Williamson, 1797–1807

== Sheriffs-Depute of Stirling (1807) ==
- 1807 - Stirling separated from Clackmannan
- David Williamson, 1807–1811
- Ranald Macdonald of Staffa, 1811–1838
- John Shaw Stewart, 1839–1840
- Robert Handyside, 1840–1853
- Charles Baillie, 1853–1858
- George Moir, 1858–1868
- Robert Bogle Blackburn, 1868–1871

== Sheriffs of Stirling and Dumbarton (1871) ==
- Robert Bogle Blackburn, 1871–1875

== Sheriffs of Stirling, Dumbarton and Clackmannan (1881) ==
- James Muirhead, 1885–1889
- Alexander Blair, 1889–1891
- John Mckie Lees, 1891–1917
- James Robert Nicolson Macphail, 1917–1933
- Sir Archibald Campbell Black, 1933–1937 (Sheriff of Lanark, 1937)
- John Charles Fenton, 1937–1942 (Sheriff of the Lothians and Peebles, 1942)
- Sir Robert Henry Maconochie, 1942–1961
- Francis Clifford Watt, QC, 1961–1971
- Robert Richardson Taylor, 1971–1975 (Sheriff Principal of Tayside, Central and Fife, 1975)
- In 1975 the sheriffdom was largely merged into the current sheriffdom of Tayside, Central and Fife.

== See also ==
- Historical development of Scottish sheriffdoms
