= Sheriff Principal of Lothian and Borders =

The Sheriff Principal of Lothian and Borders is the head of the judicial system of the sheriffdom of Lothian and Borders, one of the six sheriffdoms covering the whole of Scotland. The sheriffdom employs a number of legally qualified sheriffs who are responsible for the hearing of cases in four Sheriffs Courts based in Edinburgh, Jedburgh, Livingston and Selkirk. The current Scottish sheriffdoms were created in 1975 when the previous arrangement of 12 sheriffdoms was discontinued.

The Sheriff Principal, usually a King's Counsel (KC), is appointed by the King on the recommendation of the First Minister, who receives recommendations from the Judicial Appointments Board for Scotland. He or she must have been qualified as an advocate or solicitor for at least ten years and is responsible for the administrative oversight of the judicial system within the sheriffdom. The Sheriff Principal will also hear appeals against the judgement of his sheriffs, hear certain cases himself and occasionally conduct major fatal accident inquiries.

== Sheriffs Principal of Lothian and Borders ==
- 1975–: William James Bryden, QC
- 1978–1989: Sir Frederick William Fitzgerald O'Brien, QC
- 1989–2002: Charles Gordon Brown Nicholson, QC
- 2002–2005: Iain Macphail, Lord Macphail
- 2005–2011: Edward F. Bowen, QC
- 2022–present: Nigel Ross, KC

== See also ==
- Historical development of Scottish sheriffdoms
