= Sheriff of Perth =

The Sheriff of Perth was historically a royal official, appointed for life, who was responsible for enforcing justice in Perth, Scotland. Prior to 1748 most sheriffdoms were held on a hereditary basis. From that date, following the Jacobite uprising of 1745, the hereditary sheriffs were replaced by salaried sheriff-deputes, qualified advocates who were members of the Scottish Bar.

Following consecutive reorganisations of the Scottish sheriffdoms the position became the Sheriff of Perthshire in 1747 and the Sheriff of Perth & Angus in 1934.

The sheriffdom was dissolved in 1975 and replaced by that of Tayside, Central and Fife.

== Sheriffs of Perth ==
- Kenneth (1164)
- Roger de Mortimer of Aberdour (1209)
- John de Moray (1210)
- Geoffrey de Inverkunglas (1219)
- John Hay of Naughton (1226-1228)
- William Blund (1228)
- Malcolm of Moray (1236)
- Adam de Lochore
- William de Munfichet (1245)
- John Hay of Naughton (1246)
- William de Lauder (1251)
- David de Lochore (1255)
- Gilbert de la Hay (1262)
- John Cameron (1264)
- George de Cambrun (1266)
- Christian de l'Isle (1280)
- Nicholas de la Haye (1289)
- Walter de Burghdon (1295)
- John de Inchmartin (1305)
- Alexander de Abernethy (1305)
- John de Stirling (1334)
- Andrew Buthirgask (1344)
- John Denniston (1355)
  - Harry de Fotheringay (1357)
- Hugh de Ros (1362)
- Andrew Buthirgask (1365)
- Robert Stewart of Innermeath (1369)
- Alexander Abercrombie (1370)
- Thomas de Wanchope (1373)
- Walter Stewart of Ralston (1381)
- Walter Stewart, Earl of Atholl (1433)
  - John Spence - 1433 - Deputy
  - Archibald Stewart - 1439 - Deputy
- Patrick Charteris (1440)
- John de Haddington (1441)
- William Ruthven (1443)
- Patrick Charteris (1446)
- Patrick Graham, Lord Graham (1459)
- William Graham (1465)
- Laurence Oliphant, 1st Lord Oliphant (1470)
- Robert Abercromby (1478)
- William Ruthven, 2nd Lord Ruthven (at 1545)
- John Murray, 1st Duke of Atholl (1695–1724)
- James Murray, 2nd Duke of Atholl (1724-1748)

== Sheriffs of Perthshire (1747) ==
- Patrick Haldane, 1747-1748
- James Erskine, 1748–1754
- John Swinton, 1754–1782 (died 1799)
- William Nairne of Dunsinnan, 1783–
- Archibald Colquhoun, 1793–1807
- John Hay Forbes, Lord Medwyn, 1807–1824
- Duncan McNeill, 1st Baron Colonsay, 1824–1834
- Adam Anderson, 1835–1841
- Robert Whigham, 1841–1849
- James Craufurd, 1849–1853
- Edward Gordon, Baron Gordon of Drumearn, 1858–1866
- John Tait, 1866–1874
- James Adam, 1874–1876
- John Macdonald, Lord Kingsburgh, 1880–
- William Gloag, Lord Kincairney, 1885–1889
- Charles Pearson, 1889–1890
- Andrew Graham Murray, 1890–1891
- Andrew Jameson, Lord Ardwall, 1891–1905
- Christopher Nicholson Johnston, KC, 1905–1916
- John Wilson KC, 1917–1920
- James Condie Stewart Sandeman KC, 1920–

== Sheriffs of Perth and Angus (1934) ==
- Daniel Patterson Blades, 1934-1945 (Solicitor General for Scotland, 1945)
- James Frederick Strachan, KC, 1945–1948
- Laurence Hill Watson, KC, 1948–1952
- Thomas Blantyre Simpson, QC, 1952–1954
- Christopher William Graham Guest, QC, 1954–1955
- Sir James Randall Philip, QC, 1955–1957
- Charles Shaw, Baron Kilbrandon, 1957–1958
- Hector McKechnie, QC, 1958–1963
- George Emslie, Baron Emslie, 1963–1966
- Ian MacDonald Robertson, QC, 1966–1966
- Margaret Henderson Kidd, QC, 1966–1974
- William Murray, 8th Earl of Mansfield and Mansfield, 1974–1975
- Sheriffdom replaced in 1975 by the sheriffdom of Tayside, Central and Fife.

== See also ==
- Historical development of Scottish sheriffdoms
