= Clan Moffat =

Lowland Scottish clan

- Crest: a crest coronet and issuing therefrom a cross crosslet fitchee Sable surmounted of a saltire Argent.
- Motto: Spero meliora (I hope for greater things)

Profile
- Region: Borders
- District: Dumfriesshire

Chief
- Jean Moffat of that Ilk,
- Chief of the Name and Arms of Moffat.
- Seat: St Jasual, Wheeler End, Buckinghamshire
Rival clans
Clan Johnstone

Clan Moffat is a Border Scottish clan of ancient origin. The clan was leaderless and obscure from the mid 16th century until 1983, when Francis Moffat of that Ilk was recognised as the hereditary chief of the clan by Lord Lyon King of Arms.

== History ==
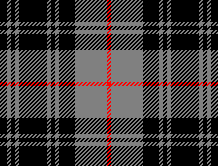
Moffat tartan

=== Origins of the clan ===
The Clan Moffat are a family from the Scottish Borders who were powerful and influential as far back as the time of William Wallace. It is likely that the ancestor of the Moffats gave their name to the town of Moffat in Dumfriesshire. William de Movat Alto, progenitor of the Movats, married the youngest daughter of Andlaw, who came from Norway to Scotland in the tenth century. Over the years the name became Montealt, then Movat, then Movest then eventually Moffat in its modern form. By the twelfth century the family were recorded as "de Moffet" which showed that they were considered to be principal lairds or land owners.

Nicholas de Moffat was Bishop of Glasgow in 1286 and the armorial bearings of each branch of the clan indicates a connection with the church.

=== Wars of Scottish Independence ===
In 1300 the Moffats were granted four charters of land in the barony of Westerkirk from Robert the Bruce who was then Lord of Annandale. One of these charters was granted to Adam Moffat of Knock. He and his brother both fought at the Battle of Bannockburn in 1314, along with many of the Moffat clansmen during the Wars of Scottish Independence. In 1336 the king of England granted safe conduct to William de Moffete and others, described as coming as ambassadors to David de Brus (David II of Scotland). Walter de Moffat who was Archdeacon of Lothian was appointed ambassador to France in 1337.

Although there were Moffats in Moffat before 1300, their names are not known. In 1342 they were granted the feu of Granton and Reddings by Sir John Douglas, Lord of Annandale. These lands remained the principal holdings of the clan until they were passed over to the Johnstones because of overwhelming debt in 1628.

=== 16th century and clan conflicts ===
The Clan Moffat like most other Border clans were raiders and Border Reivers, and had many feuds with other clans. Their most notable enemies was the powerful Clan Johnstone. There are accusations that the Johnstones murdered Robert Moffat, who was possibly the clan chief, in 1557. A pardon was granted to Gavin, John, and Robert Johnston "for assent, art, and part in the murder of Robert Moffat (not a fortnight before) during service in the Church of Moffat." However, the speed of the pardon and the temperament of Moffat for being a brawler, suggests that the Edinburgh Court gave this pardon because "there were extenuating circumstances."

It is also claimed that members of the Clan Johnstone burned a church in which a number of Moffats had gathered, slaughtering those who tried to escape, but the source of this information has no primary source cited and appears to have no substantiated evidence. It is likely that the story is conflated with events leading up to the Battle of Dryfe Sands, wherein the Johnstons burned a church where members of Clan Maxwell sought shelter. Regardless, from that date the Clan Moffat was considered a leaderless clan until 1983 when the Lord Lyon King of Arms recognised Francis Moffat as chief after many years of research.

=== The modern clan ===
From at least the mid sixteenth century the clan was without a chief, until 1983 when after many years of research, Francis Moffat was granted the undifferenced Arms of Moffat of that Ilk, and recognised as the hereditary chief of the clan by Lord Lyon King of Arms. In April 1992, the chiefship passed to his daughter, Jean Moffat of that Ilk..

== Clan profile ==
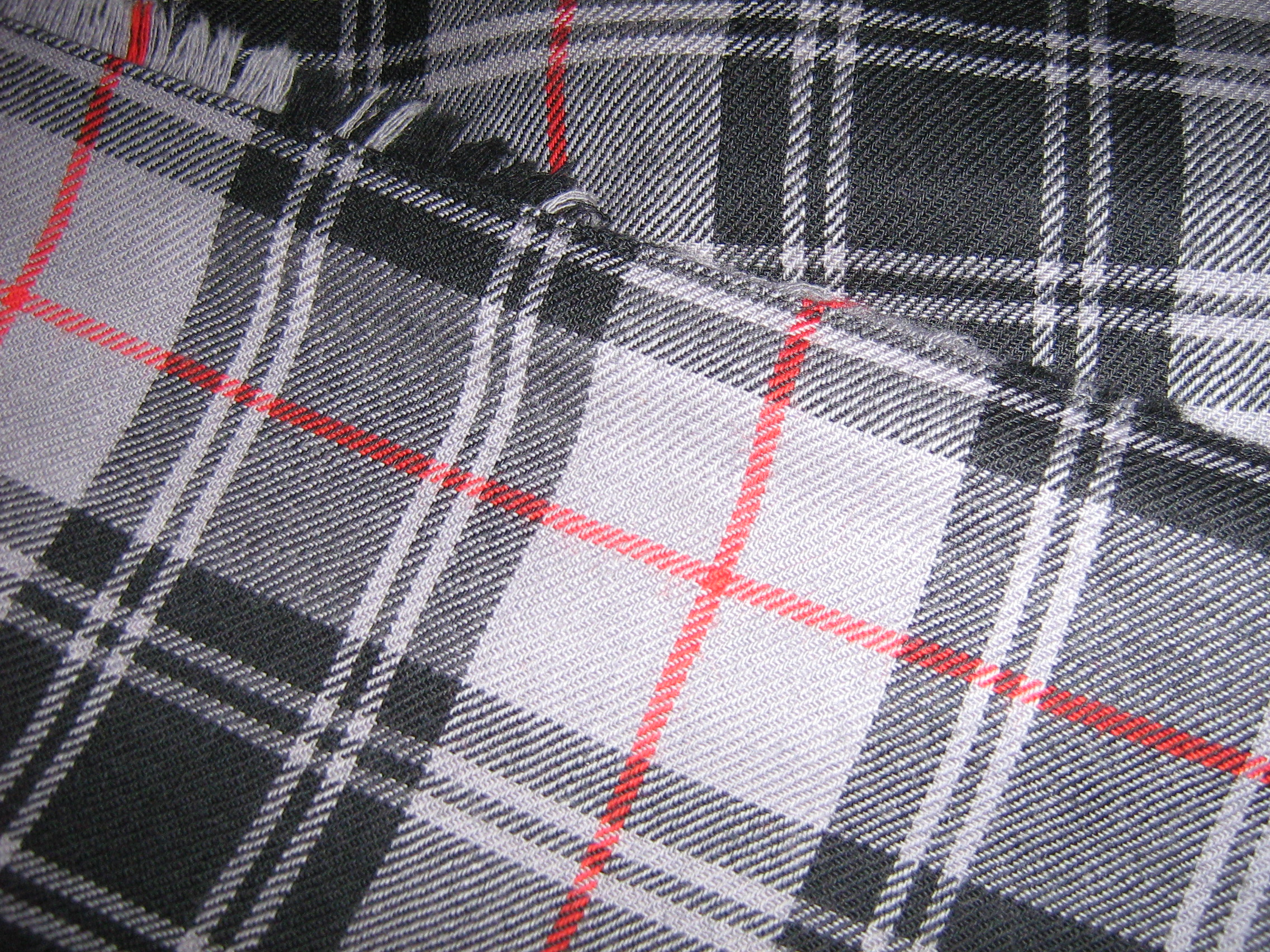
A kilt bearing the Moffat tartan. This modern tartan is based upon the Douglas tartan.

=== Origin of the name ===
The surname Moffat/Moffatt is a territorial name of Norman origin with Gaelic Anglicization, given to the town of Moffat in Dumfriesshire. This quasi-place-name has been theorized to be translated as "the long plain," which possibly could be derived from two elements: magh ("plain") and fada ("long"). The area of Moffat does not resemble a "long plain" at all, so it is thought that "Moffat" was the locals' attempt at saying "Mowat" as the Mowats, Moffats, and Montaltos all share a common progenitor and at one time bore identical arms (Major Francis Moffat of that Ilk, "The Moffats"). Records as far back as the 1300s show an individual named "Monte Alto, pronounced 'Mowat.'" This is an example of the Anglicization of a Norman name. A good example of this is Belvoir Castle which is pronounced "Beaver Castle." The castle in no way resembles a furry aquatic mammal, but to the locals it was easier to say. Similarly, the name Monte Alto (pronounced "Mowat") was written as Movvat, and from there "very easily corruptible to Moffat" (Major Francis Moffat of that Ilk, "The Moffats").

=== Clan chief, crest and motto ===
- Clan chief: Jean Moffat of that Ilk, Chief of the Name and Arms of Moffat.
- Clansman's Badge: A member of the Clan may wear a Badge consisting of the Crest from the Chief's Arms encircled by a strap and buckle . The Moffat Chief's arms has "a crest coronet and issuing there from a cross crosslet fitchee Sable surmounted of a saltire Argent".
- Clan motto: Spero meliora (translation from Latin: "I hope for better things.")

=== Clan tartan ===
The Moffat family tartan is a very modern tartan, created by Major Francis Moffat of that Ilk, after being recognised as the chief of the clan in 1983. The tartan is heavily based upon the Clan Douglas tartan. According to Major Francis Moffat of that Ilk, in his book, "The Moffats," the colors he selected for the modern tartan (black, silver, and a very small amount of red) were taken from the most ancient arms coats associated with the Moffats, a black rampant lion on a silver field, with red teeth and claws.

== See also ==
- Clan Johnstone
- Scottish clan
- Mowat
- Monte Alto
- Bernard de Monte Alto or Mowat (d.1306), Scottish knight and brother of William
- William de Monte Alto or Mohaut (d.1327), Scottish nobleman and brother of Bernard
- Montalt (disambiguation)
- Montaut
