= Castle Rising Castle =

12th-century castle in Norfolk, England

Castle Rising
- Castle Rising, Norfolk, England
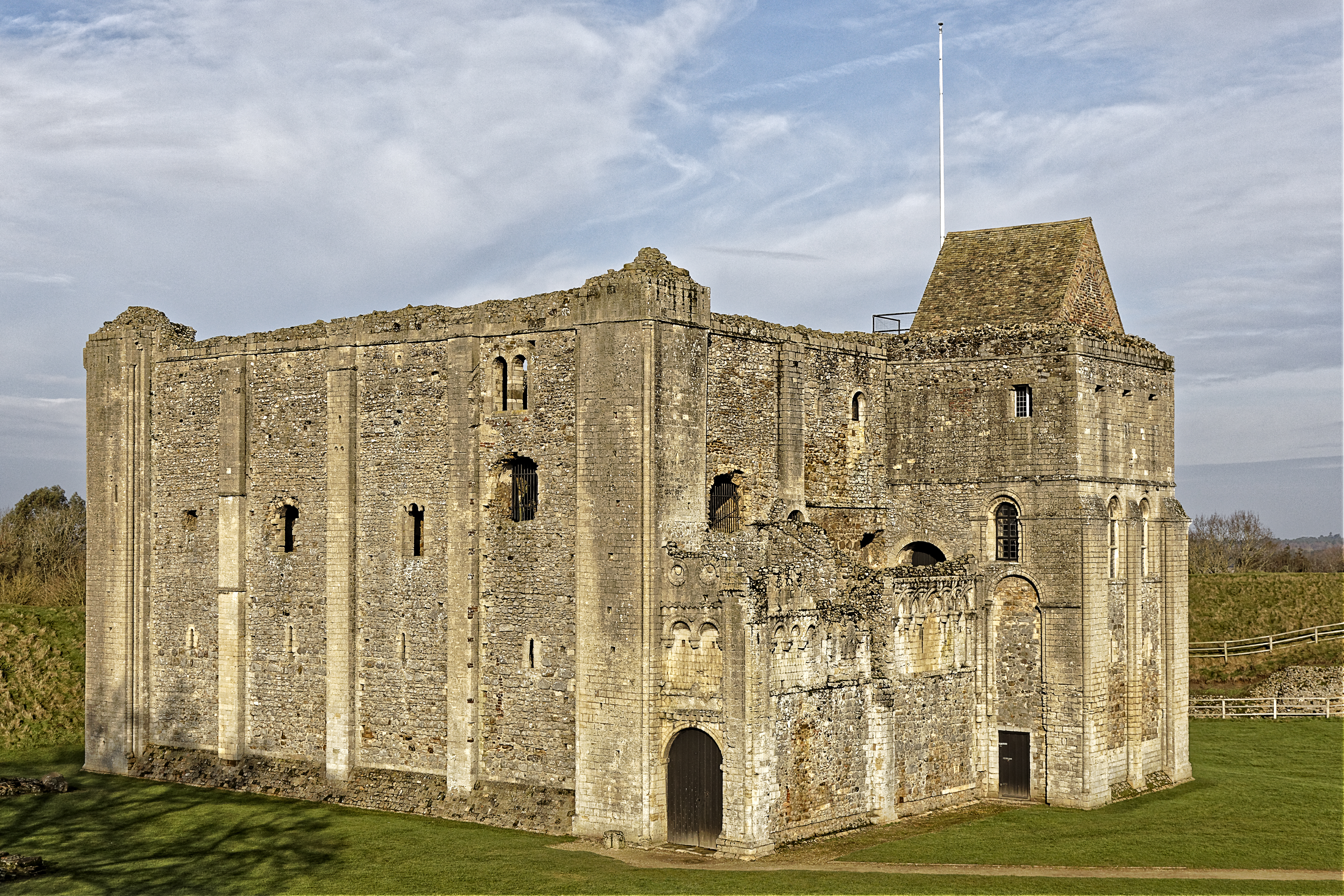
- Castle Rising's keep, seen from the south-east, with its distinctive pilaster buttresses, and the forebuilding on the right

Site information
- Owner: Lord Howard of Rising
- Open to the public: Yes
- Condition: Ruins

Location
- Location within Norfolk
- Coordinates: 52.7928°N 0.4689°E
- Grid reference: grid reference TF66572455

Site history
- Built by: William d'Aubigny II
- Events: Revolt of 1173–1174

Castle Rising is a ruined medieval fortification in the village of Castle Rising, Norfolk, England. It was built soon after 1138 by William d'Aubigny II, who had risen through the ranks of the Anglo-Norman nobility to become the Earl of Arundel. With his new wealth, he constructed Castle Rising and its surrounding deer park, a combination of fortress and palatial hunting lodge. It was inherited by William's descendants before passing into the hands of the de Montalt family in 1243. The Montalts later sold the castle to Queen Isabella, who lived there after her fall from power in 1330. Isabella extended the castle buildings and enjoyed a regal lifestyle, entertaining her son, Edward III, on several occasions. After her death, it was granted to Edward, the Black Prince, to form part of the Duchy of Cornwall.

During the 15th century, the castle became increasingly valued for its hunting facilities rather than its military defences. It fell into disrepair and, despite the construction of new living quarters and service facilities, by the middle of the 16th century it was derelict. Henry VIII sold the property to Thomas Howard, the Duke of Norfolk, and most of the castle buildings were demolished. It was not until the 19th century, when Mary and Fulke Greville Howard inherited the property, that the castle was renovated and restored. Victorian scholars examined the site, and it was opened to the public. In 1958 the castle passed into the custody of the state, which carried out further stabilisation work and a programme of archaeological investigation. In 1998 English Heritage passed the management of the site back to its current owner, Baron Howard of Rising, who continues to operate the castle as a tourist attraction.

Castle Rising comprises three baileys, each defended by large earthworks, covering a total area of 5 hectares (12 acres), which archaeologists Oliver Creighton and Robert Higham consider to be among the most impressive in Britain. In the inner bailey is the great keep, probably modelled on that of Norwich Castle. It features extensive Romanesque designs, including pilaster buttresses and arcading. Historians Beric Morley and David Gurney believe this to be "one of the finest of all Norman keeps", and its military utility and political symbolism have been extensively discussed by academics. The castle was originally surrounded by a carefully managed landscape, from the planned town in front of the castle, to the deer park and rabbit warrens that stretched out behind it, intended to be viewed from the lord's chamber in the great keep.

== History ==
=== 12th – 13th centuries ===
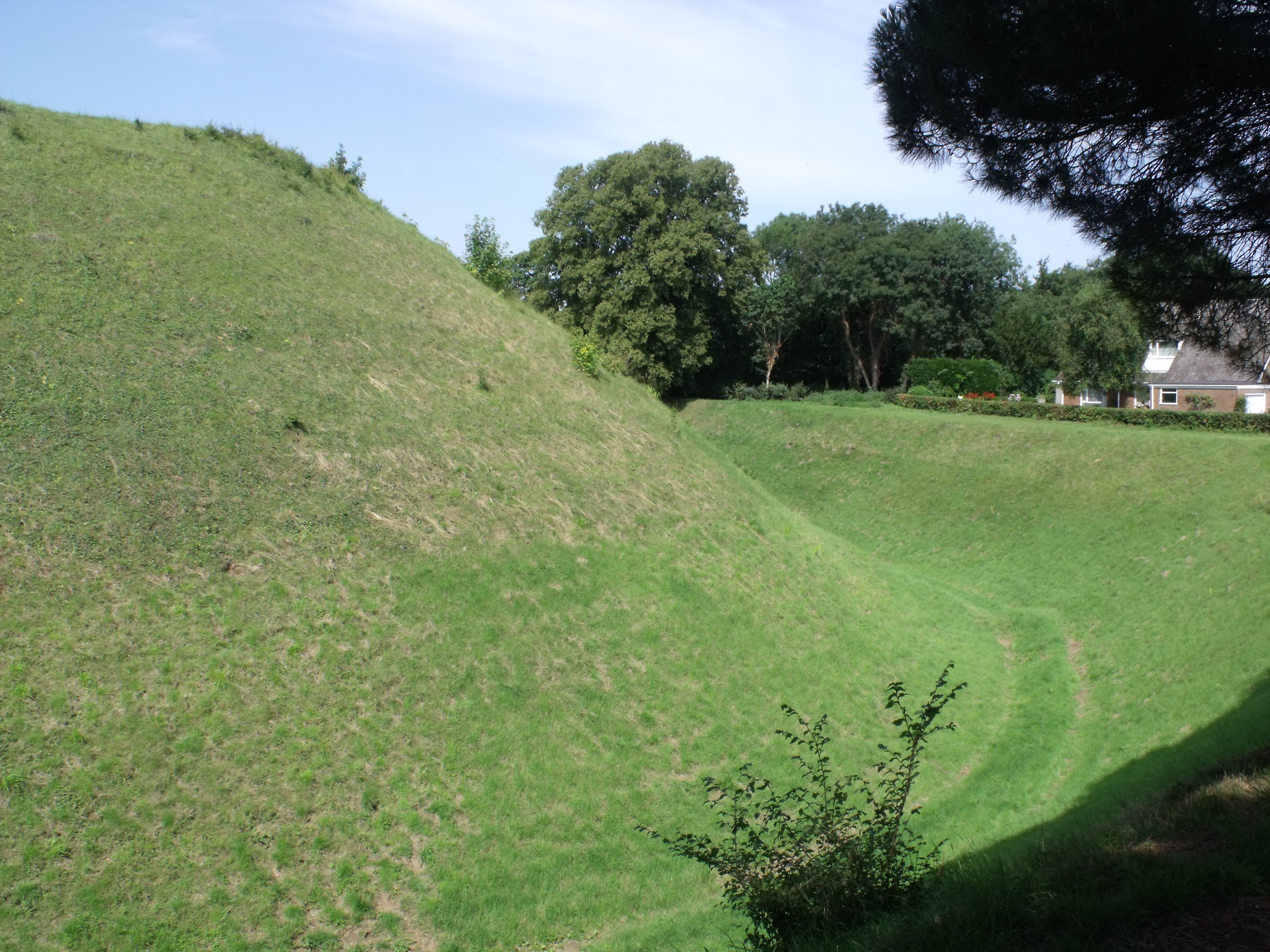
The earthworks of Castle Rising

Castle Rising was built soon after 1138 by William d'Aubigny II, an upwardly mobile Anglo-Norman noble who owned the surrounding manor of Snettisham. William married Adeliza of Louvain, the widow of King Henry I in that year, and became the Earl of Arundel in 1139. This transformed his social position, and one chronicler at Waltham Holy Cross complained how he "became intolerably puffed up ... and looked down upon every other eminence in the world except the King". With his new wealth, William built Castle Rising and New Buckenham Castle in Norfolk, and expanded Arundel Castle in West Sussex.

The castle was located 5 miles (8.0 km) from the port of King's Lynn. In the 12th century it would have typically have been reached by boat, through a channel in the marshy Babingley River that ran nearby. (Note: There is a local tradition in Norfolk that Castle Rising was a sea-port in the early medieval period, but modern research has shown this to be incorrect.) Following the Norman Conquest of England, the land had been granted to Bishop Odo, the Earl of Kent, who may have used it as an administrative centre; there were many Saxo-Norman buildings on the site of the later castle. (Note: Archaeological evidence shows that there was Iron Age and Roman occupation of the surrounding area, with a Roman villa situated at nearby South Wootton, but there is no firm evidence of pre-Saxo-Norman occupation of the castle site itself.) Although Norfolk was a prosperous region during this period, the location of the castle was not strategically important: its only militarily significance would have been as a regional muster point, and the surrounding lands were thinly populated, with poor, acidic agricultural soil. The attraction of the site to William is believed to have been that it was a relatively cheap and easy place in which to build a substantial new building and establish a large hunting park. Historian Richard Hulme argues that William essentially built "a palatial hunting lodge" on the site.

Massive resources were required to construct Castle Rising, which included three baileys with large earthwork defences and a stone keep, with an adjacent deer park just behind the castle. As part of the project, the existing settlement was moved away to the north, where it became a planned settlement adjacent to the new castle. A pre-existing Norman chapel on the site, built around 1100, was encircled by the castle defences, and the new parish church of St Lawrence was built in the town instead, although it is possible that this church also pre-dates the castle. William received permission from King Stephen to open a mint at the castle in 1145 and, probably linked to this development, settled a community of Jews in the town. (Note: England's Jews during the first half of the 11th century often settled near castles, particularly those operating mints; the castles provided protection from anti-Semitism, and they were heavily involved in both money-lending and often the operation of the mints themselves.)

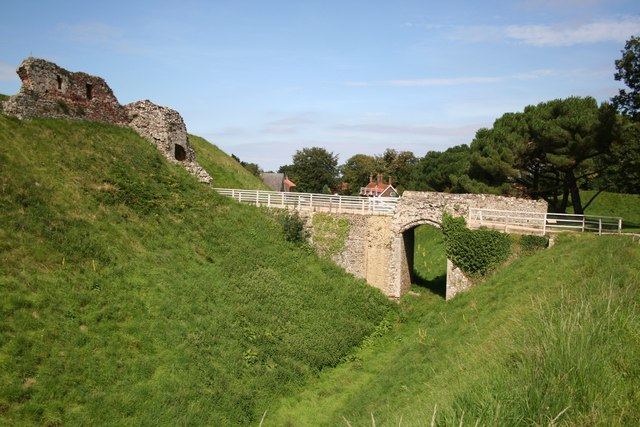
Earthworks of the inner bailey, with the remaining 14th-century brick wall and 12th-century gatehouse (left) and the stone bridge (centre)

It is uncertain how often William actually stayed at his new castle. He and his wife probably preferred to reside in their estates around Arundel in the south of England, and both William and his descendants chose New Buckenham Castle, rather than Castle Rising, to serve as the caput, or main castle, for their Norfolk landholdings.

A prolonged civil war known as the Anarchy broke out in England from 1138 until 1154, between the followers of King Stephen and the Empress Matilda, only ending when Matilda's son, Henry II, finally inherited the kingdom. Despite William having backed Stephen during the war, after the end of the conflict he proved a loyal supporter of Henry and was allowed to retain his possessions. Henry clamped down on the operation of the regional mints, however, and closed the facility at Castle Rising; the local Jews resettled in King's Lynn. A second, rapid phase of construction work on the castle then occurred, probably in the 1170s in response to a major rebellion against Henry II. (Note: Historians Beric Morley and David Gurney prefer a slightly date for the work on the earthworks, potentially pushing the date forward into the early 13th century.) William supported the King, and fought against the rebels at the Battle of Fornham in neighbouring Suffolk. Around this time the height of the earth defences was doubled and the internal level of the west bailey raised to form a platform.

The castle was inherited by William d'Albini III, and in turn by his son, William IV, and grandson, William V. William V died in 1224, leaving it to his brother Hugh. Probably by this time the chapel inside the castle walls had fallen out of use as a religious building, and was instead employed for secular purposes. The top 3.7 metres (12 ft) of the keep's walls are distinctively different from the rest of the building, and one theory to explain this is that the castle keep was not in fact completed during William II's lifetime, and that the final work on walls was carried out between 1200 and 1230 by his descendants. (Note: There is agreement among historians that the top 3.7 metres (12 ft) of the keep's walls are different from the remainder of the building: a line of flints in the stonework mark the division between the two, with differences in the carved stonework and evidence of older stonework having been covered up by later additions or reused for new purposes. R. Allen Brown concludes that this is probably the result of renovations to decaying stonework in the early 14th century. He suggests that such a change of style would not be consistent with an attempt to finish an existing building, and that any decay of stonework would begin on the upper layers. He also draws links between this work and the work known to have occurred in the early 14th century in the forebuilding. Beric Morley and David Gurney argue that the dramatic change of style is evidence that the work was not intended to repair an existing building, but rather to complete a previously unfinished one, probably between 1200 and 1230. They also point to the relatively paucity of Norman finds in the excavation of the castle bailey, potentially an indicator that the building was not completed during its initial build.) Hugh died childless in 1243, and the castle then passed to Roger de Montalt.

=== 14th century ===
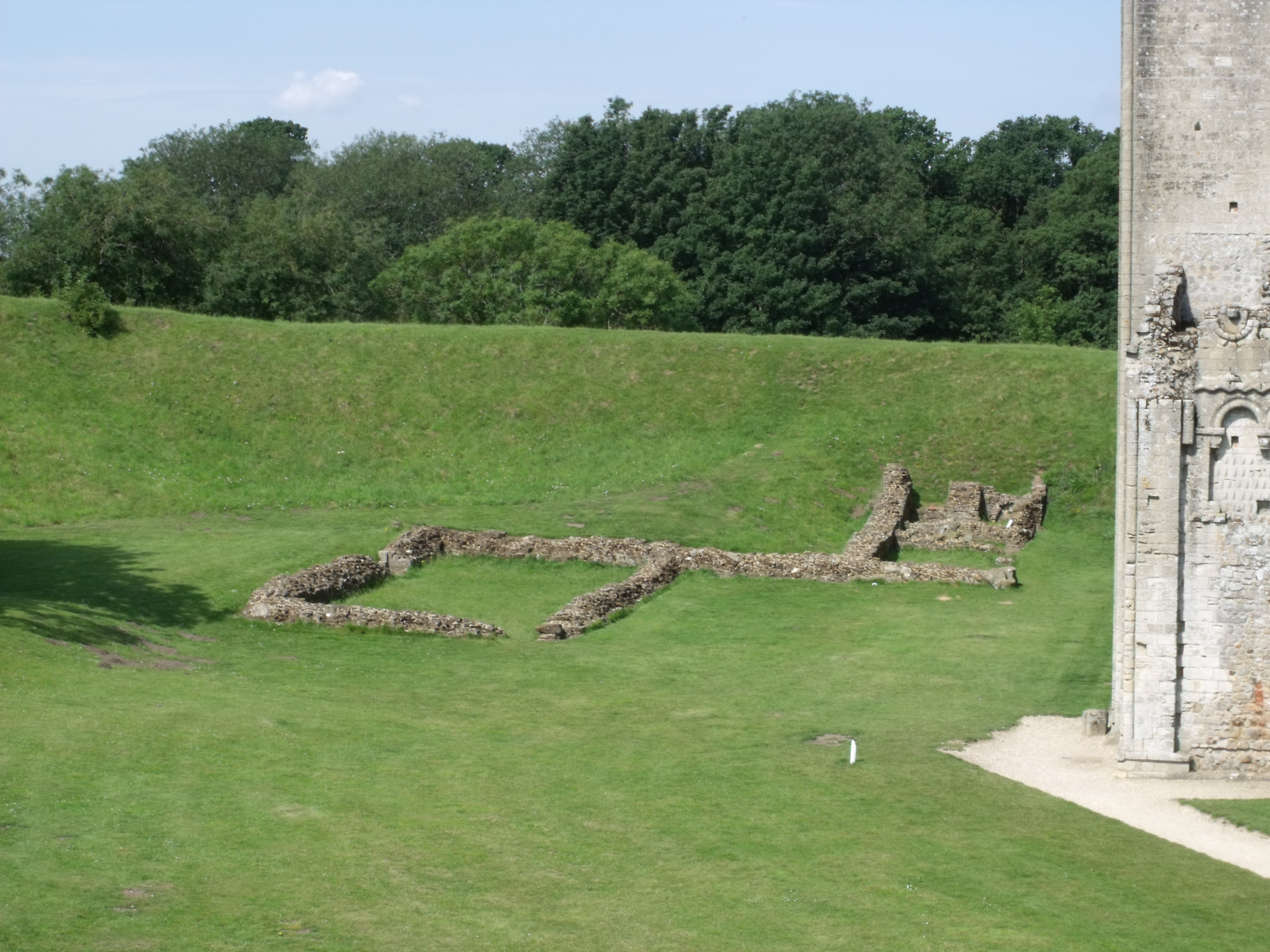
The foundations of the chapel and parts of the west range, built in the inner bailey during Queen Isabella of France's ownership of the castle

The Montalts were a prominent baronial family, but they had few other estates in the region and their family fortunes declined. In 1327, Roger de Montalt's younger brother, Robert, who was childless, sold the reversion of his rights in the castle to the Crown in 1327 for 10,000 marks – effectively selling it to the Crown with a life-time lease for him and his wife Emma. An alternative theory to explain the different style of stonework along the top of the keep is that the building was completed under William d'Albini II, but had become dilapidated by the start of the 14th century, requiring extensive repairs by Robert. The forebuilding of the keep was raised in height at one end around this time and a new, peaked roof added to it, and an imposing, timber-framed, brick kitchen was built in the inner bailey.

At the time of Robert's agreement with the Crown, the government of England was controlled by Roger Mortimer and Queen Isabella of France, who was ruling as regent in the name of her young son, Edward III. Isabella fell from power when Edward toppled Mortimer in a coup d'état in 1330, but after a short period of house arrest she led a relatively normal life, enjoying considerable status as the King's mother. Edward granted Isabella several royal castles in England, including Castle Rising. Robert had died in 1329 and in 1331 Emma sold her rights to the castle to Isabella for £400.

From then on, Isabella used Castle Rising as one of her main residences until her death in 1358. Isabella was a wealthy woman, as the King granted her a yearly income of £3,000, which by 1337 had increased to £4,000. She enjoyed a regal lifestyle in Norfolk, maintaining minstrels, huntsmen and grooms, and received visits from Edward and the royal household on at least four occasions. Despite her large income, Isabella ran up long-standing debts with the local merchants near the castle. Around the time that she took over the castle, a new set of buildings was constructed in the central bailey, including a west range containing a residential suite, a new private chapel, and a south range linking to various service buildings; the existing kitchen was reused. The great hall was reroofed, although Isabella lived in the west range, using the keep only for formal occasions or as accommodation for very senior guests. A brick wall around the outside of the inner bailey may have been built around this time to provide additional security.

The castle then passed to Isabella's grandson, Edward the Black Prince. Edward III had decreed in 1337 that his son would inherit the castle after Isabella's death, complete with the surrounding manor and the right to part of the tolls from King's Lynn, although these brought in only a relatively modest £100 a year. As part of this arrangement, the King declared the castle to be a permanent part of the Duchy of Cornwall, an estate traditionally assigned for the use of the Prince of Wales. The Prince undertook repairs to the castle during the 1360s, including spending £81 on repairing the "Nightegale Tower" in 1365, although it is uncertain which part of the castle this refers to. (Note: Analysis of the other buildings mentioned in the records of repairs suggest that the "Nightegale Tower" was not the keep, but could have been a reference to the gatehouse or one of the towers along the walls.) The Prince died in 1376, returning the Duchy of Cornwall to the control of the Crown, and during this time Castle Rising appears to have been maintained in good condition. It was ordered on several occasions during the 1380s to raise local forces to counter the threat of a French invasion, and may have been equipped with two cannons. If not built by Isabella, the brick wall around the inner bailey may have been constructed during this period.

Under Richard II, the rights to the castle changed hands several times, despite Edward's charter having made it a permanent part of the Duchy. Richard's government gave the castle to John, the Duke of Brittany, in 1378, in exchange for the Château de Brest. Richard subsequently gave the reversion of the castle first to his uncle Thomas, Duke of Gloucester, in 1386, and then to another uncle, Edmund, Duke of York in 1397. Shortly after Richard was overthrown, the courts declared these grants to have been illegal, and returned the castle to the Duchy in 1403, then in the possession of the future Henry V.

=== 15th – 18th centuries ===
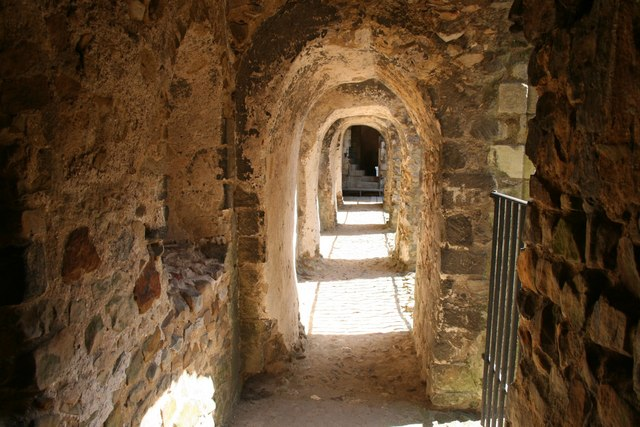
Mural passage, dug out of the walls after the keep had become largely derelict in the 16th century

In the 15th and early 16th centuries, Castle Rising continued to be owned by the Duchy of Cornwall. Although the castle's military defences were mobilised by Henry VI in 1461 during the Wars of the Roses, it became increasingly more prominent as a hunting facility. The role of the constable of the castle was often combined with that of the surveyor or ranger of Rising Chase, the parkland around the castle. The castle may have been a prestigious location during this period, although its facilities were not as extensive as those of other castles and manors known for their hunting. Senior visitors to the castle included Mary Tudor, Queen of France, and Charles Brandon, the Duke of Suffolk, and its constables included nobles such as Lord Ralph de Cromwell and John de Vere, the Earl of Oxford.

Minor repairs on the castle were carried out during the period, including to the castle bridge, but the state of the property gradually declined. The old kitchens were removed in the early 15th century, and a new, larger facility constructed in their place. Once built, however, the new kitchens, along with the rest of the buildings in the inner bailey, were left to deteriorate. Reports in 1482 stated that the buildings were no longer weatherproof, and a survey carried around between 1503 and 1506 described the castle as "evyll repayred", and noted that the roof of the keep was rotten. This last survey urged that existing repair works on the buildings in the bailey be completed, but suggested that it might not be worth repairing the keep because of the excessive cost.

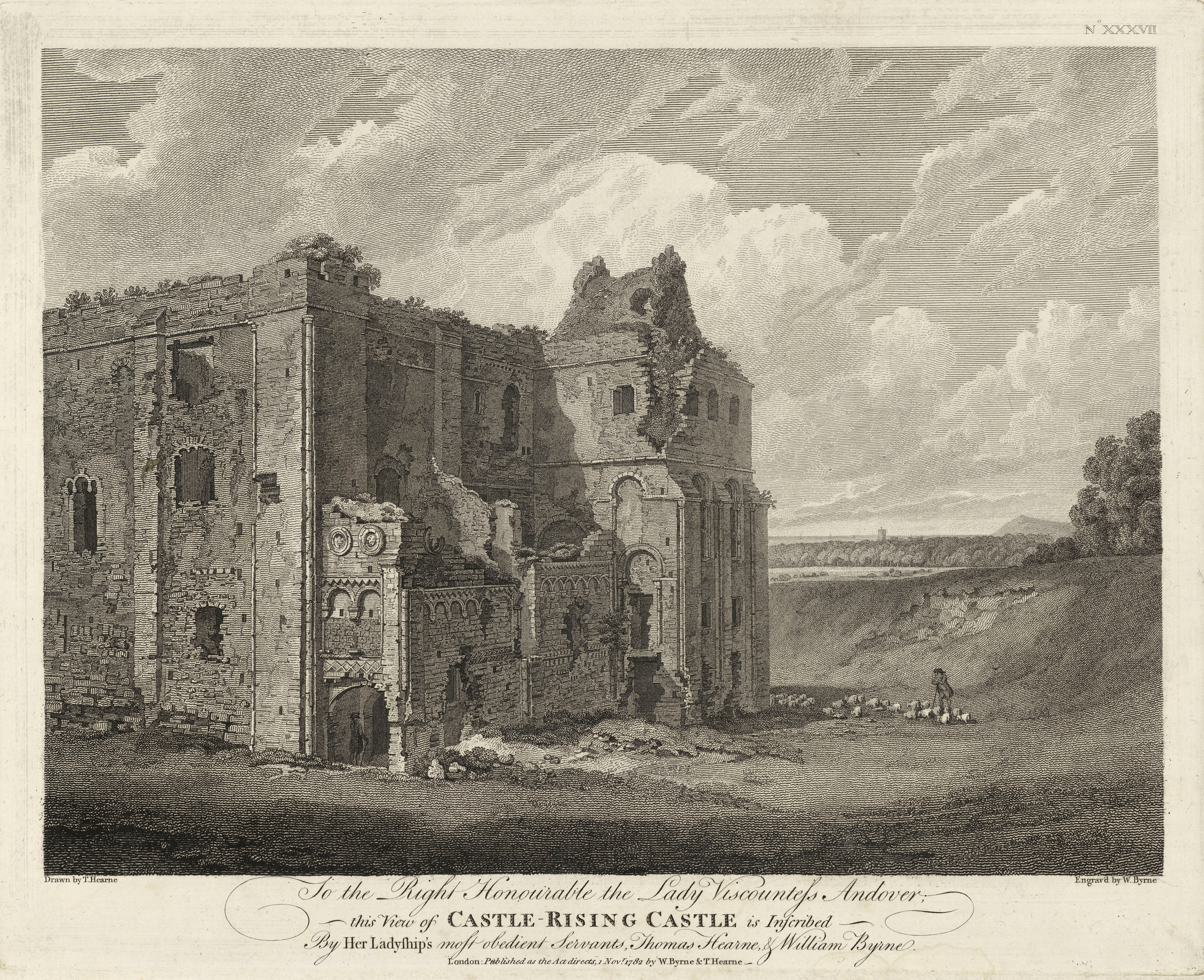
Engraving of the ruined keep in 1782, by William Byrne

Despite these challenges, fresh construction work was carried out around this time. The southern range and the kitchen were pulled down, and replaced with a new set of lodgings for guests, complete with stables, although the resulting buildings were not particularly robust. Problems reappeared, and a survey between 1542 and 1543 noted that, with the exception of the new lodgings, the castle was in "greate ruin and decaye". The roof of the keep had by now collapsed, as probably had the floors of the great hall and chamber. The survey costed the necessary repairs to the crumbling walls around the inner bailey at £100. At around this time, the forebuilding of the keep was adapted to form a separate, smaller, set of chambers, and at some point after this a passageway was dug out of the walls to link these to the kitchens in the keep, by-passing the now floor-less rooms of the keep.

In 1544 Henry VIII bequeathed the castle to Thomas Howard, the Duke of Norfolk, but the property continued to decline. By the 1570s the castle and its earthworks had been allowed to become infested with rabbits, whose warrens caused extensive damage; a survey suggested that fully renovating the castle would cost £2,000, and that even if it were pulled down and sold for the value of its materials, it would only realise £66. At the end of the century, the inner bailey was finally cleared of most of its buildings; the new lodgings were pulled down, along with most of the west range and the old Norman chapel, leaving only the ruined keep, alongside the latrines and the newer chapel, although what these last two were then used for is uncertain. The foundations of the old chapel were slowly covered up by the earth defences.

During the 17th century, the ground floor of the keep – made of hardened gravel – was dug up, probably to reuse for surfacing roads or pathways. The apartments in the forebuilding were abandoned and this part of the keep fell into decay as well. In 1644, the lands surrounding the castle were disparked, bringing an end to Castle Rising Chase. In 1705 stone was stripped from the castle to help repair a nearby sluice gate.

=== 19th – 21st centuries ===
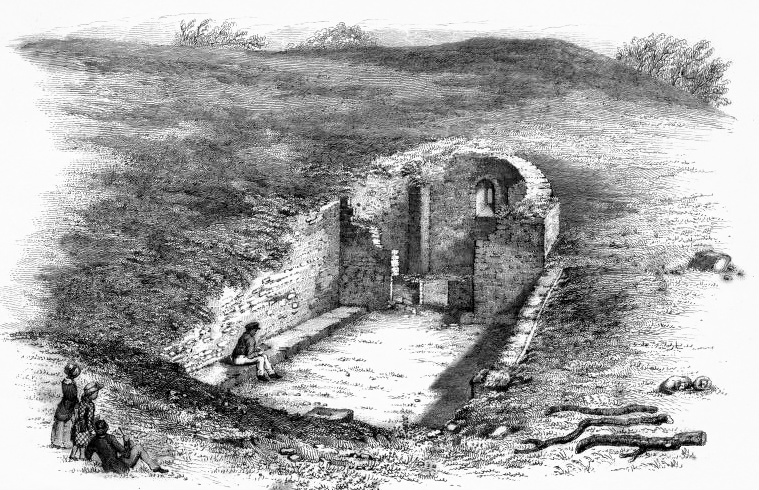
Visitors at the newly uncovered Norman chapel, 1850

Castle Rising continued to be owned by the Howard family, and in the 19th century it was inherited by Mary Howard, and her husband Fulke Greville Howard. Fulke began to undertake restoration work, excavating the basement of the keep in 1822 and repairing some of the stonework. The ground level of the inner bailey, which had built up over the years, was lowered by about 1 metre (3 ft 3 in): according to the contemporary archaeologist Henry Harrod, this process required thousands of loads of earth to be dug out and removed. A great deal of medieval archaeological evidence was destroyed in the process, but the work uncovered the old Norman chapel and Harrod excavated the building in 1851. Mary continued the excavation work on the castle site after Fulke's death, and restored the stonework of the chapel.

Initially the chapel was believed to be of Anglo-Saxon origin and to have been buried under the earthworks when they were first constructed. An argument then ensued between the antiquarian William Taylor, who championed the Anglo-Saxon dating for the site, and Harrod, who insisted that the chapel was in fact Norman in origin; the issue was not settled until later in the 20th century, when the Norman date was confirmed. By 1900 the castle was open to the public, overseen by a caretaker who lived in one corner of the keep, the section of which had been reroofed and turned into an apartment.

By 1958 the castle's condition had deteriorated and the Ministry of Works took legal custody of the site, although it continued to be owned by the Howard family. Conservation work took place during the 1960s, stabilising the stonework of the keep. Archaeological investigations were then carried out, focusing on the keep in 1970, the church and the earthwork defences during 1971 and 1972, and the inner bailey from 1973 to 1976. This research centred on archaeological excavations and the recording of remains; as with similar castles investigated during this period, the site was then preserved as a monument, and grass lawns laid down around the remaining stonework and foundations. Further excavations were carried out in 1987 during the construction of the ticket office beside the castle.

English Heritage took over control of the castle in 1983 and continued to operate it as a tourist attraction. In the 21st century the castle is protected by UK law as an ancient monument and a Grade I listed building. It remains in the custody of English Heritage, but since 1998 has been managed by its owner, Baron Howard of Rising.

== Architecture and landscape ==
=== Landscape ===
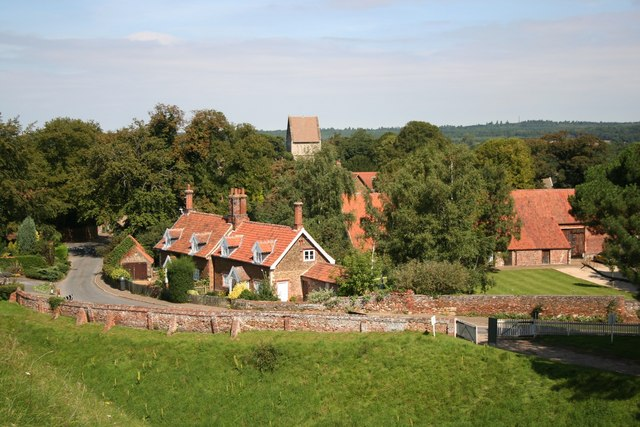
The planned settlement of Castle Rising, seen from the castle

The fortification of Castle Rising was constructed in a carefully designed landscape. In front of the castle was the town of Castle Rising, moved to its new site when the castle was built. The settlement appears to have been laid out to a grid-plan design, possibly bounded by ditches; with the castle positioned just behind it, in a similar fashion to that at New Buckenham and Malton Castle. A dovecot and a religious house were founded nearby; both of these were important symbols of lordship at the time, and were considered essential parts of a properly established castle.

The castle's deer park, which merged into the larger Rising Chase, was positioned behind the castle in a similar way to that at Devizes Castle. The castle effectively formed an interface between the town and the park; the great hall in the keep faced the settlement, and the lord's chamber overlooked the park, creating a symbolic divide between the public and private aspects of the building.

Rising Chase was around 16 miles (26 km) in circumference, enclosing around 20 square miles (52 km^{2}). It utilised marginal farm-land, which may have contributed to its design; the heathland and light woodland south of the castle would have been ideal for grazing deer. The park was also designed with aesthetics in mind, being shaped so that its boundaries stretched beyond the horizon when viewed from the keep, in a similar design to that at Framlingham, Ludgershall and Okehampton Castles. Indeed, while the park would originally have provided the castle venison and other products, it was probably more ornamental than practical in character, including a space of open grazing in the centre of the park, designed to be visible from the castle chamber. The castle also incorporated a large rabbit warren, an important source of food and fur in this period, which stretched 5 kilometres (3.1 mi) away south-west from the castle.

=== Architecture ===
==== Baileys, including the early Norman church ====
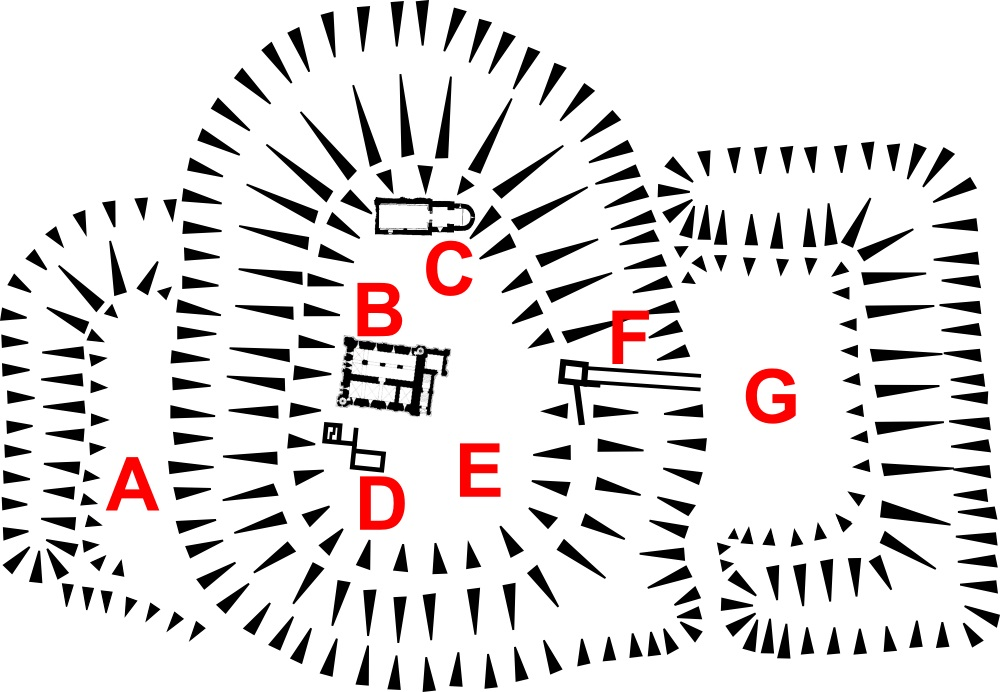
Plan of Castle Rising in the 21st century; A - west bailey; B - keep; C - Norman chapel; D - remains of 14th-century west range and chapel; E - inner bailey; F - gatehouse, barbican and bridge; G - east bailey

Castle Rising is made up of two rectangular baileys to the west and east, and an oval inner bailey in the middle, each with their own substantial earthwork defences and ditches. The earthworks of Castle Rising cover a total area of 5 hectares (12 acres), and are considered by archaeologists Oliver Creighton and Robert Higham to be among the most impressive in Britain. The interior of the western bailey has been levelled up to form a platform, and is no longer directly connected to the rest of the castle. The eastern bailey is 82 metres (269 ft) by 59 metres (194 ft) across, and formed a protective buffer, covering the entrance way to the inner bailey.

A stone bridge connects the eastern bailey to the inner bailey, and is 24 metres (79 ft) across, still retaining some of its original stonework at its base, although the remainder of it has since been rebuilt many times. The bridge leads onto a stone gatehouse, dating from around 1138; when it was first built it was substantially taller and longer than today. It was originally equipped with a portcullis, and a stone barbican was later built outside it for additional protection.

Beyond the gatehouse is the inner bailey, which forms a ringwork 73 metres (240 ft) by 60 metres (200 ft) in size, with a circumference of 320 metres (1,050 ft); the banks are now 18 metres (59 ft) high from the bottom of the defensive ditch, although they were originally only half this height. It is uncertain what was placed around the top of this bank when it first built; there may have been a wooden palisade, or possibly a timber revetment. Some of the remains of the 14th-century brick wall, built on an additional 1 metre (3 ft 3 in) layer of limed sand for stability, have survived along part of the bank. There were three towers built along the walls during the medieval period, two of which have left their mark in the earth banks; the location of the third is uncertain.

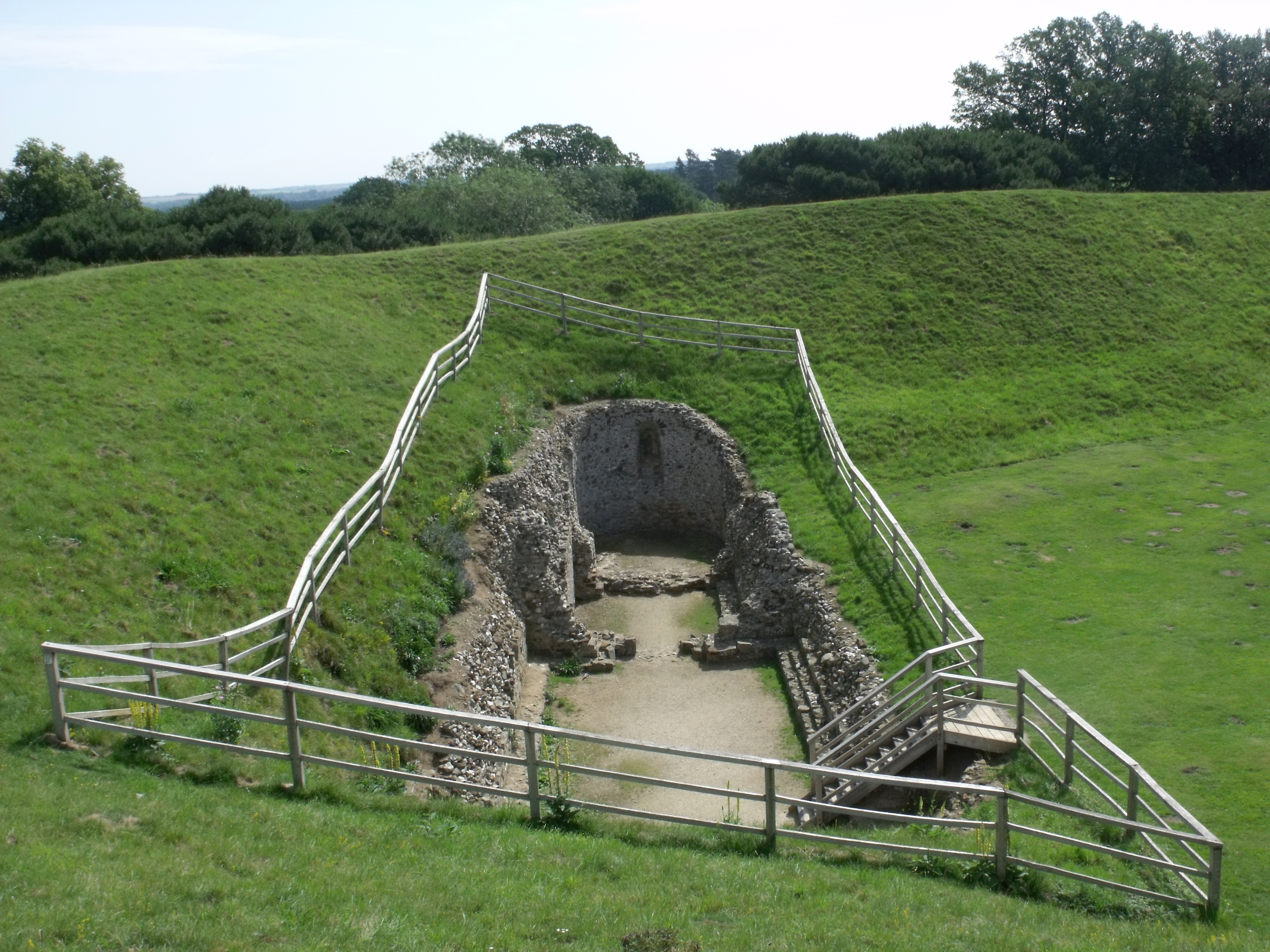
The Norman chapel, looking east

The main architectural focus of the inner bailey was the great keep, but it also contained a Norman chapel and, from at least the 14th century onwards, a complex of smaller residential and service buildings. The visible stone foundations on the north side of the keep belong to the chapel and range built for Queen Isabella around 1330. (Note: Archaeologists divide the buildings in the bailey into six different, numbered periods, covering the period from around 1300 to 1544. Isabella's ownership of the castle falls into phase 1.) The bailey well can also still be seen.

On the north side of the bailey are the remains of an early Norman church, which comprised a nave, a square tower and an apsidal chancel, 12.7 metres by 6 metres (42 ft by 20 ft), 4 metres square (13 ft square) and 4.6 metres by 4 metres (15 ft by 13 ft) respectively. It was built from local grey sandstone, and Roman tiles from one of the nearby villas were used to construct its roof and incorporated into the walls. Originally the tower would have had a church bell, and the casting pit for this is buried under the floor of the nave. A stone bench runs around the base of the walls, and in the 19th century there was also a stone base for a font in the nave, but this has since been lost. The font is now located in the local church (St Lawrence's church in the village of Castle Rising) and is notable for the cats heads which are carved on two sides of it (possibly to reflect the name of the saint, Felix, who the church in the castle bailey was dedicated to). A piece of early medieval graffiti, possibly depicting a Norman soldier, has survived on the south exterior wall. A fireplace was added to the chapel during the Tudor period, although this was only in use for a few years before being abandoned.

==== Keep ====
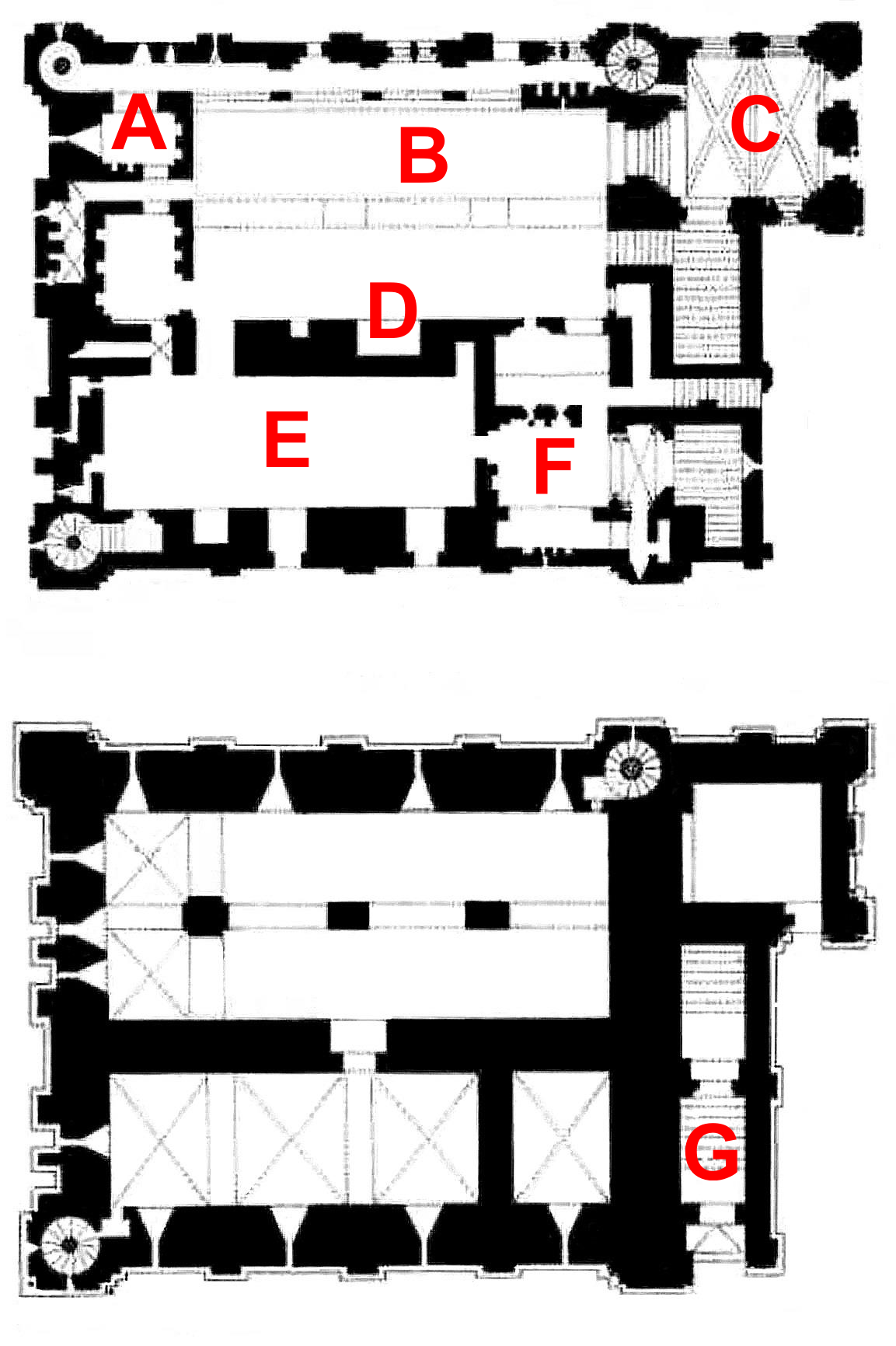
Plan of Castle Rising's keep, 1st floor (top), ground floor (bottom); A - kitchen; B - Great hall; C - waiting room; D - throne niche; E - great chambers; F - chapel; G - entrance to forebuilding

Historians Beric Morley and David Gurney consider Castle Rising to have "one of the finest of all Norman keeps". It is an early example of the longer, oblong form of these buildings, called a hall-keep, and would have taken huge resources to erect. Externally, it resembles Henry I's keeps at Norwich and Falaise, although Norwich appears to have inspired the latter design, and Rising's internal layout was probably based on that at Norwich as well. In imitating Norwich, which was then the only royal castle in the county, Castle Rising may have been intended to symbolise D'Albini's loyalty to the Crown during the troubled years of the Anarchy.

The keep is built from courses of local, brown carrstone rubble with oolite ashlar facings, and is strengthened with intramural timbers, laid down within the stone walls to reinforce the structure. Its main body is 24 metres (79 ft) by 21 metres (69 ft) wide, with walls approximately 15 metres (49 ft) high, with a forebuilding running along the east side. It has prominent pilaster buttresses, giving the keep what Sidney Toy describes as an "impression of strength and dignity"; the corners have clasping buttresses, forming four turrets. There is extensive Romanesque detail on the outside of the keep, including arcading along the west side and decorative stonework on the forebuilding.

The interior of the keep is divided by an internal wall to improve its structural strength, the division running north–south through the building. The basement of the keep has two main sections, the north room 18 metres (59 ft) by 8 metres (26 ft), with pillars supporting the great hall above, and the south chamber 18 metres (59 ft) by 5 metres (16 ft) in size. The forebuilding leads from the ground to the first floor, up a passageway 2.4 metres (7 ft 10 in) wide with 34 steps and through three arched doorways. At the top is a waiting room; the glazed windows are a mixture of Tudor and more modern insertions.

On the first floor is the great hall, 14 metres (46 ft) by 7 metres (23 ft), now floorless and open to the sky. Its original entrance way was blocked up by a chimney when the forebuilding was converted into a separate apartment in the Tudor period, and an additional entrance way inserted into the castle wall. The fireplace itself was later filled in with Tudor tiles around 1840. A mural passageway, dug out in the Tudor period, leads through to the kitchen and service quarters. On the southern side is the great chamber with a large, original 12th-century fireplace, and a mixture of original tri-lobed windows and 19th-century additions. At the far end of the great chamber is an ornate chapel, with Norman arcading and arching. The keep was originally built to have been relatively self-contained, and would not have needed many additional outbuildings to function as a residence.

The second floor of the keep is limited in space, and contains only one small room above the chapel which was possibly used the chaplain or by castle guards. The forebuilding was later equipped with an additional room on this level, 4.8 metres (16 ft) by 4.8 metres (16 ft), which remained inhabited longer than the rest of the castle keep, and which contains a 19th-century fireplace. The upper 3.7 metres (12 ft) of the keep's walls are different in design to the main body of the building; as described above, this may be the result of either a final phase of construction between 1200 and 1230, or a period of repair and renovation shortly after 1300.

=== Utility and symbolism ===
Many 20th-century historians have stressed the potential military strength of Castle Rising; R. Allen Brown, for example, concluded that "defence ... was the overwhelming consideration in [its] design and construction", and argued that the keep would have been used as a final refuge in the case of attack during a siege. Beric Morley and David Gurney believe that the military strength of the castle could not have failed to impress contemporaries. Sidney Toy suggested that the forebuilding would have made an effective defensive feature, enabling the defenders to attack intruders as they made their way up the stairs, with Morley and Gurney describing it as "a deadly and near impregnable approach to the castle's interior".

Despite this, the defensive qualities of Castle Rising have since been extensively debated. The historian Robert Liddiard argues that the large windows at Castle Rising would have been a significant weakness, as it would have been easy to fire arrows through them from the bailey, and George Garnett has questioned the utility of the defensive arrow slits, which he suggests were not well positioned or designed. The whole site was also overlooked by higher ground, which Liddiard considers would have been a key defensive weakness.

Great keeps such as Castle Rising's were also important ceremonially and symbolically in the 12th century, however, and historian Thomas Heslop has described Castle Rising as "a fortress palace", with the keep forming the palace, and the surrounding earthworks the more practical defences. They reflected lordly status: typically their owners had recently advanced up the social scale, as with William d'Aubigny, and were keen to impress others with their new authority. (Note: The builders of Hedingham and Conisborough castles were similarly also new men, keen to reaffirm their new status through constructing grand works.)

With this in mind, the positioning of Castle Rising may have exposed it to higher ground, but it also made it strikingly prominent across the valley. The whole entrance to the castle was also designed to communicate to a visitor the status of the castle lord. As they came through the gatehouse and past the earthworks into the bailey, the south side of the forebuilding - deliberately facing the entrance - would have been revealed, covered in fashionable carving and decorative features. Visitors would then have walked up the stairs of the forebuilding, have paused in a waiting room, originally largely open to the elements, before being allowed through a decorative entrance door. The doorway led into the great hall, from where the lord, possibly sat in a throne alcove to the left, would have met the visitor.

=== Ceremonial entrance ===
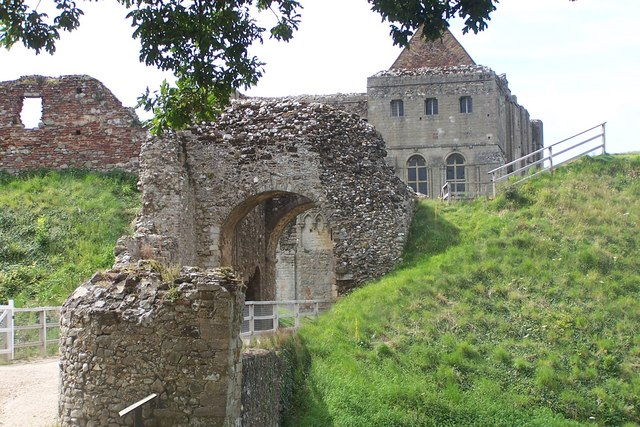
Senior visitors would have passed over the bridge ...

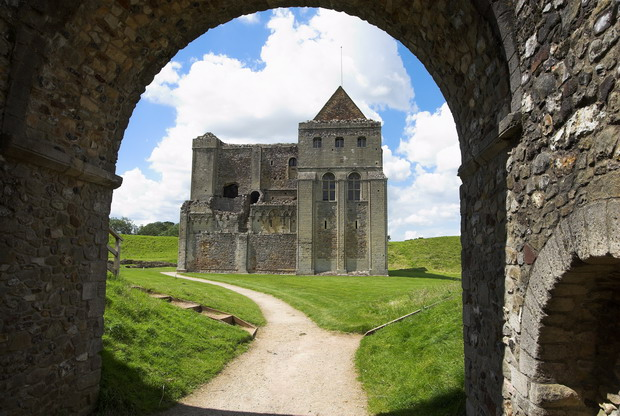
... into the gatehouse ...

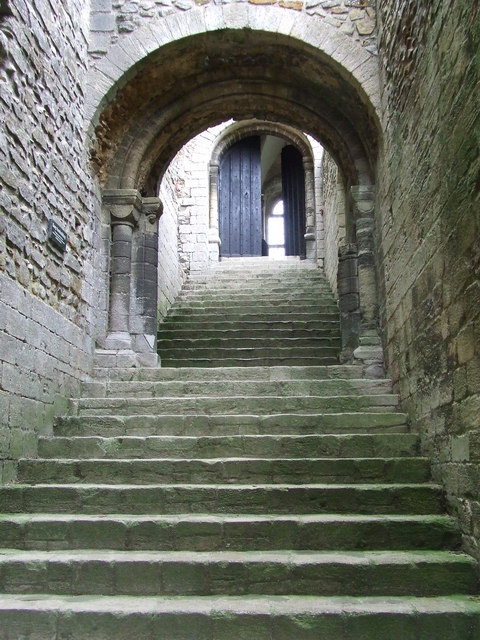
... through the forebuilding ...

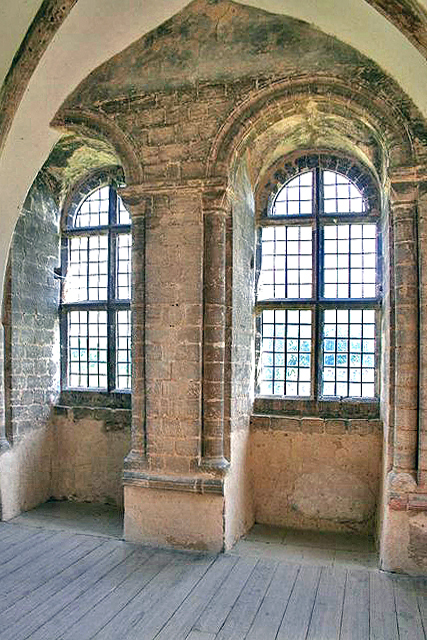
... into the waiting room ...

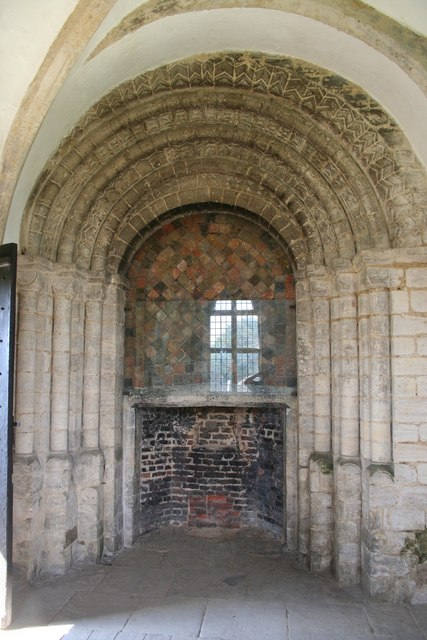
... and through the doorway ...

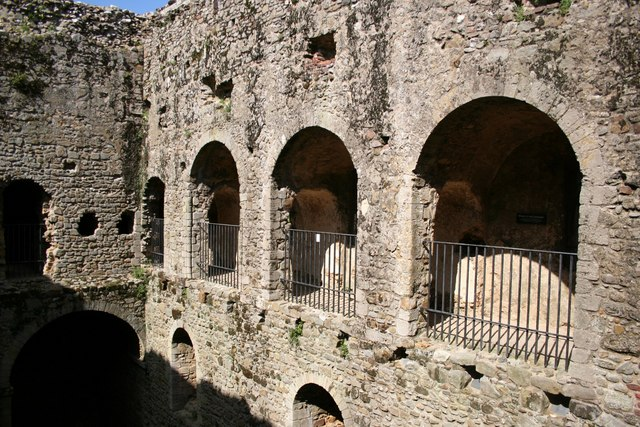
... to finally meet the lord in the great hall.

== See also ==
- Castles in Great Britain and Ireland
- List of castles in England

== Bibliography ==
- Brown, R. Allen (1962). English Castles. London, UK: B. T. Batsford. OCLC 1392314.
- Brown, R. Allen (1988). Castle Rising Castle. London, UK: English Heritage. ISBN 1-85074-159-X.
- Brown, R. Allen (1989). Castles From the Air. Cambridge, UK: Cambridge University Press. ISBN 978-0-521-32932-3.
- Creighton, Oliver Hamilton (2005). Castles and Landscapes: Power, Community and Fortification in Medieval England. London, UK: Equinox. ISBN 978-1-904768-67-8.
- Creighton, Oliver Hamilton; Higham, Robert (2003). Medieval Castles. Princes Risborough, UK: Shire Archaeology. ISBN 978-0-7478-0546-5.
- Dixon, Philip (1998). "Design in Castle-building: The Controlling of Access to the Lord". Château Gaillard: Études de castellologie médiévale. 18: 47–56.
- Doherty, Paul (2004). Isabella and the Strange Death of Edward II. London, UK: Robinson. ISBN 978-1-84119-843-9.
- Garnett, George (2000). "Conquered England, 1066–1215". In Saul, Nigel (ed.). The Oxford Illustrated History of Medieval England. Oxford, UK: Oxford University Press. pp. 61–101. ISBN 978-0-19-289324-6.
- Goodall, John (2011). The English Castle. New Haven, US and London, UK: Yale University Press. ISBN 978-0-300-11058-6.
- Green, David (2004). "Edward the Black Prince and East Anglia: An Unlikely Association". In Ormrod, W. M. (ed.). Fourteenth Century England. Vol. 3. Woodbridge, UK: Boydell Press. pp. 83–98. ISBN 978-0-19-289324-6.
- Harrod, Henry (1857). Gleanings Among the Castles and Convents of Norfolk. Norwich, UK: C. Muskett. OCLC 4253893.
- Heslop, Thomas Alexander (2003). "Orford Castle: Nostalgia and Sophisticated Living". In Liddiard, Robert (ed.). Anglo-Norman Castles. Woodbridge, UK: Boydell Press. pp. 273–296. ISBN 978-0-85115-904-1.
- Higham, Robert; Barker, Philip (2004). Timber Castles. Exeter, UK: University of Exeter Press. ISBN 978-0-85989-753-2.
- Hillaby, Joe (2003). "Jewish Colonisation in the Twelfth Century". In Skinner, Patricia (ed.). Jews in Medieval Britain. Woodbridge, UK: The Boydell Press. pp. 15–40. ISBN 978-1-84383-733-6.
- Hillaby, Joe; Hillaby, Caroline (2013). The Palgrave Dictionary of Medieval Anglo-Jewish History. Basingstoke, UK: Palgrave Macmillan. ISBN 978-1-137-30815-3.
- Hulme, Richard (2007–2008). "Twelfth Century Great Towers - The Case for the Defence". The Castle Studies Group Journal. No. 21. pp. 209–229.
- Liddiard, Robert (2000). "Castle Rising, Norfolk: A 'Landscape of Lordship'?". In Harper-Bill, Christopher (ed.). Anglo-Norman Studies: Proceedings of the Battle Conference 1999. Vol. 22. Woodbridge, UK: Boydell Press. pp. 169–186. ISBN 978-0-85115-796-2.
- Liddiard, Robert (2005). Castles in Context: Power, Symbolism and Landscape, 1066 to 1500. Macclesfield, UK: Windgather Press. ISBN 978-0-9545575-2-2.
- Mileson, Joe (2007). "The Sociology of Park Creation in Medieval England". In Liddiard, Robert (ed.). The Medieval Park: New Perspectives. Macclesfield, UK: Windgather Press. pp. 11–26. ISBN 978-1-905119-16-5.
- Morley, Beric; Gurney, David (1997). Castle Rising Castle, Norfolk. Norfolk, UK: Norfolk Museums Service. ISBN 0-905594-23-1.
- Mortimer, Ian (2008). The Perfect King: The Life of Edward II, Father of the English Nation. London, UK: Vintage. ISBN 978-0-09-952709-1.
- Pounds, Norman John Greville (1994). The Medieval Castle in England and Wales: A Social and Political History. Cambridge, UK: Cambridge University Press. ISBN 978-0-521-45828-3.
- Stalley, Roger A. (1999). Early Medieval Architecture. Oxford, UK: Oxford University Press. ISBN 978-0-19-284223-7.
- Toy, Sidney (1985) [1939]. Castles: Their Construction and History. New York, US: Dover. ISBN 978-0-486-24898-1.
- White, Graeme J. (2012). The Medieval English Landscape, 1000–1540. London, UK and New York, US: Bloomsbury. ISBN 978-1-4411-6308-0.
