= Mowatt =

Mowatt is a Scottish surname, a Sept of Clan Sutherland. Notable people with the surname include:

- Alex Mowatt (born 1995), West Bromwich Albion footballer
- Andrew Mowatt (born 1964), Canadian sprinter
- Anna Cora Mowatt (1819–1870), author, playwright, public reader, and actress
- Francis Mowatt (1837–1919), British civil servant
- Francis Mowatt (politician) (1803–1891), British Radical politician
- Judy Mowatt (born 1952), Jamaican reggae artist
- Kemar Mowatt (born 1995), professional Jamaican hurdler
- Magnus Mowatt (1917–1979), Scottish professional footballer
- Taryne Mowatt (born 1986), former All-American pitcher for the University of Arizona softball team
- Todd Mowatt, pioneer in the interactive entertainment industry
- William Mowatt (1885–1943), New Zealand cricketer
- Zeke Mowatt (born 1961), former American football tight end in the National Football League

== See also ==
- Mowat
- Mouat
- Moffat
- Montalt (disambiguation)
- Montalto
- Monte Alto
