= Monte Alto =

Monte Alto may refer to:

== People ==
- Bernard de Monte Alto or Mowat (d.1306), Scottish knight and brother of William
- William de Monte Alto or Mohaut (d.1327), Scottish nobleman and brother of Bernard
- Eustace de Montaut or Monte Alto or Montalt (c.1027–1112), Breton soldier and English nobleman
- Hugh de Montaut or Monte Alto or Montalt (c.1050–1130), English nobleman

== Places ==
- Monte Alto culture, an archaeological site on the Pacific Coast in what is now Guatemala
- Monte Alto, São Paulo, a municipality in the state of São Paulo, Brazil
- Monte Alto, Texas, United States
- Monte Alto Protected Zone, in Costa Rica
- Mount Alto, Kilkenny, a County Kilkenny hill, Ireland

== See also ==
- Montalt (disambiguation)
- Montaut
