= Mouat =

Mouat may refer to:

- Bruce Mouat (born 1994), Scottish curler
- Elizabeth Mouat (1825–1918), English shipwreck survivor
- Frederic J. Mouat (1816–1897), British surgeon
- Grace Elizabeth Mouat (born 1996), English actress
- Sir James Mouat (1815–1899), British Surgeon General and Victoria Cross recipient
- Kit Mouat (1920–1986), English poet
- Mike Mouat (born 1954), Canadian hockey player
- William Alexander Mouat (1821–1871), British seafarer
- Mouat Street, a street in Fremantle

== See also ==
- Mowat
- Mowatt
- Moffat
- Montalt (disambiguation)
- Monte Alto
