= Mowat =

Family name

Mowat is a surname of Scottish origin, a Sept of Clan Sutherland. Notable people with the surname include:

- Alex Mowat (1935–1995), Scottish paediatric hepatologist
- Angus McGill Mowat (1892–1977), Canadian librarian, novelist, father of Farley Mowat
- C. L. Mowat (1911–1970), British-born American historian
- Claire Mowat (born 1933), Canadian writer of children's fiction, environmentalist
- Farley Mowat (1921–2014), Canadian novelist, environmentalist, husband of Claire Mowat
- Henry Mowat (1734–1798), Royal Navy officer
- Jack Mowat (1908-1995), Scottish football referee
- John Bower Mowat (1825–1900), Canadian Presbyterian minister, Queen's University professor
- John McDonald Mowat (1872–1916), Canadian politician, lawyer, World War I officer
- John Mowat (college administrator) (1791–1860), Scottish-born soldier; Canadian merchant, politician and educator
- Oliver Mowat (1820–1903), Canadian politician, Premier of Ontario 1872–1896
- Vicki Mowat, Canadian provincial politician in Saskatchewan

== See also ==
- Mowat Block in Toronto
- Mowatt
- Mouat
- Moffat
- Montalt (disambiguation)
- Montalto
- Monte Alto
