= Montalt (disambiguation) =

Montalt is a mountain of the Serra de Montalt, Serra de Llaberia, Catalonia, Spain

Montalt may refer to:

== People (Surname) ==
- Eustace de Montaut or Monte Alto or Montalt (c.1027–1112), Breton soldier and English nobleman
- Ezequiel Montalt or Ezequiel Montalt Ros (born 1977), Spanish actor
- Hugh de Montaut or Monte Alto or Montalt (c.1050–1130), English nobleman
- Robert de Montalt, 1st Baron Montalt also Mohault or Mohaut (1270–1329), English nobleman
- Roger de Montalt, 1st Baron Montalt also Mohault or Mohaut (1265–1297), English nobleman

== People (Given name) ==
- Charles Torquil de Montalt Fraser (born 1960), British soldier

== Places ==
- Sant Vicenç de Montalt, municipality in the comarca of the Maresme in Catalonia, Spain
- De Montalt Mill, paper mill in Combe Down, Somerset, England

== Titles ==
- Baron Montalt also Mohault or Mohaut, was a title that was created twice in the Peerage of England in 1275 and 1299
- Earl de Montalt, was a title created in the Peerage of the United Kingdom in 1886

== See also ==
- Monthault, a commune in the Ille-et-Vilaine department, Brittany, France
- Xavier Barbier de Montault (1830–1901), French writer on Catholic Church history
- Montaut
- Montalto
- Monte Alto
