= Cromarty Castle =

Former castle in Cromarty, Scotland

Coordinates: 57.6778°N 4.0263°W

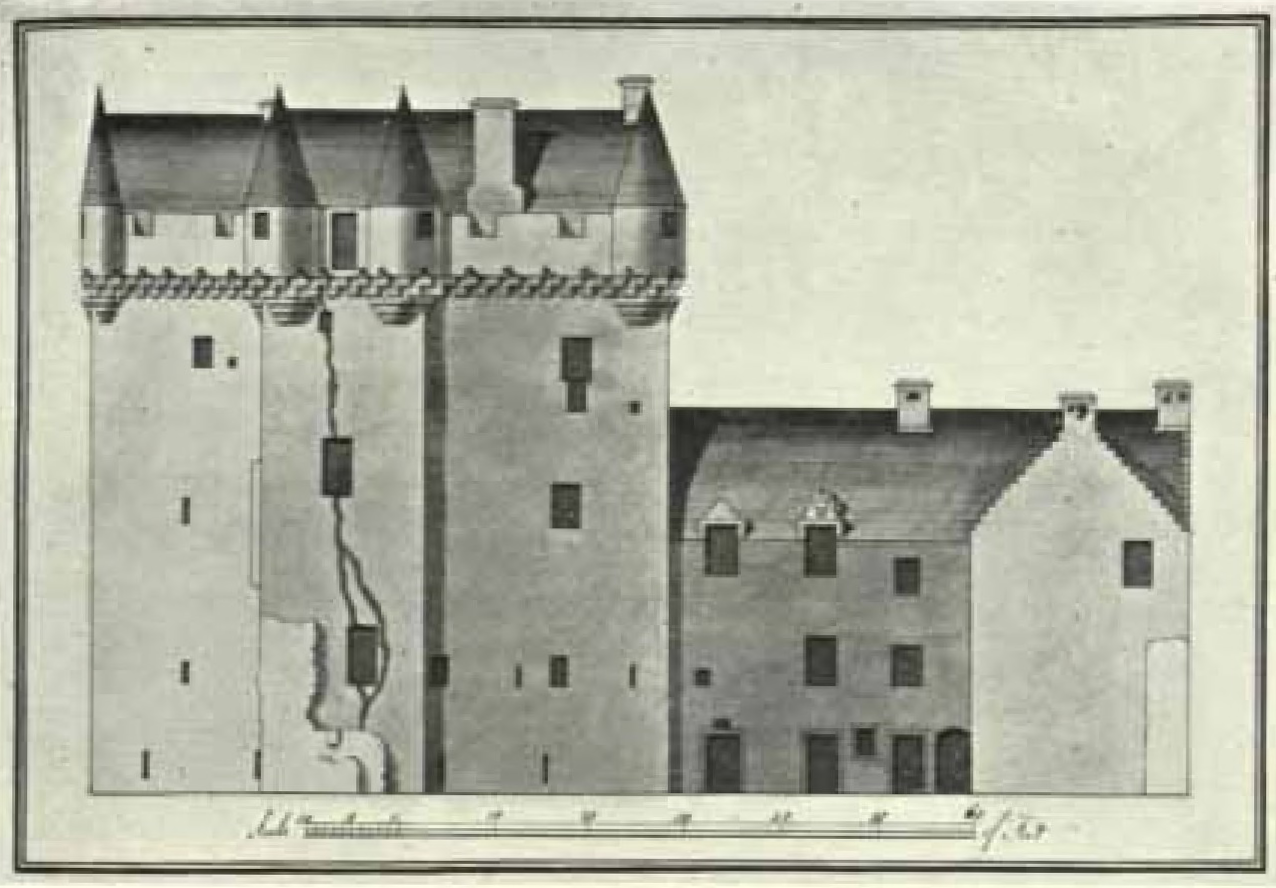
Cromarty Castle, as an L-shaped tower house, in 1746

Cromarty Castle was a castle in Cromarty, Scotland. Cromarty, then known as Crumbathyn, was created a royal burgh in the reign of King Alexander I of Scotland. Cromarty overlooks the entrance to the Cromarty Firth and was strategically important. A motte-and-bailey castle was built in the 12th–13th century. The castle was held by Sir William de Monte Alto during the Scottish wars of independence for both the English and the Scottish.

Permission was given to Sir William Urquhart, the Sheriff of Cromarty, to crenellate the motte of Cromarty in 1470. Sir William's son Thomas built an L-plan tower house. The castle was demolished in 1772, and the stone and timbers used in the construction of Cromarty House.
