= Castle Rising =

Village and civil parish in Norfolk, England

Coordinates: 52°47′35″N 0°28′08″E

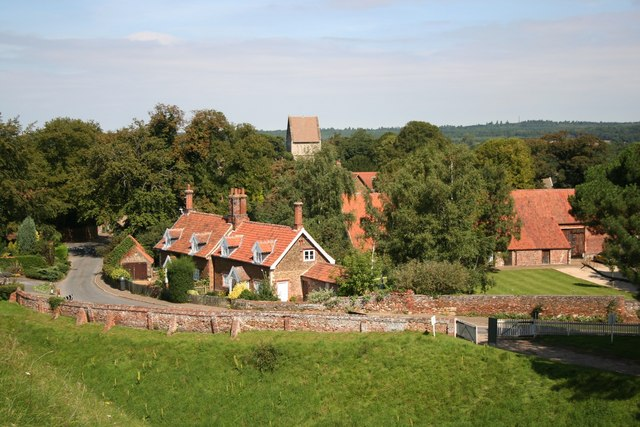
- Castle Rising

- Location within Norfolk
- Area: 8.65 km^{2} (3.34 sq mi)
- Population: 200 (2021)
  - Density: 23/km^{2} (60/sq mi)
- OS grid reference: TF655245
- Civil parish: Castle Rising
- District: King's Lynn and West Norfolk
- Shire county: Norfolk
- Region: East
- Country: England
- Sovereign state: United Kingdom
- Post town: KING'S LYNN
- Postcode district: PE31
- Dialling code: 01553
- Police: Norfolk
- Fire: Norfolk
- Ambulance: East of England
- UK Parliament: North West Norfolk

Castle Rising is a village and civil parish in the English county of Norfolk. It is 4 miles (6.4 km) north-east of King's Lynn and 37 miles (60 km) north-west of Norwich.

The village is on the course of the River Babingley, which separates it from the lost village of Babingley. At the 2021 census the population of Castle Rising was 200, a slight decrease from 216 at the 2011 census.

== History ==
Castle Rising's is named after the Norman castle of the same name. In the Domesday Book it is listed as a settlement of 41 households in the hundred of Freebridge and was part of the estates of Bishop Odo of Bayeux.

Castle Rising Castle was built in the 1140s on the orders of William d'Aubigny and was most famously the residence of Queen Isabella after her role in the murder of Edward II. The castle was subsequently passed to Edward the Black Prince and, today, the site is managed by English Heritage.

Before the Reform Act of 1832, Castle Rising was a parliamentary borough. Due to its small population, it is often given as an example of a rotten borough. Samuel Pepys was the member of parliament for the constituency of Castle Rising between 1673 and 1679, as was Robert Walpole between 1701 and 1702.

== St Lawrence's Church ==
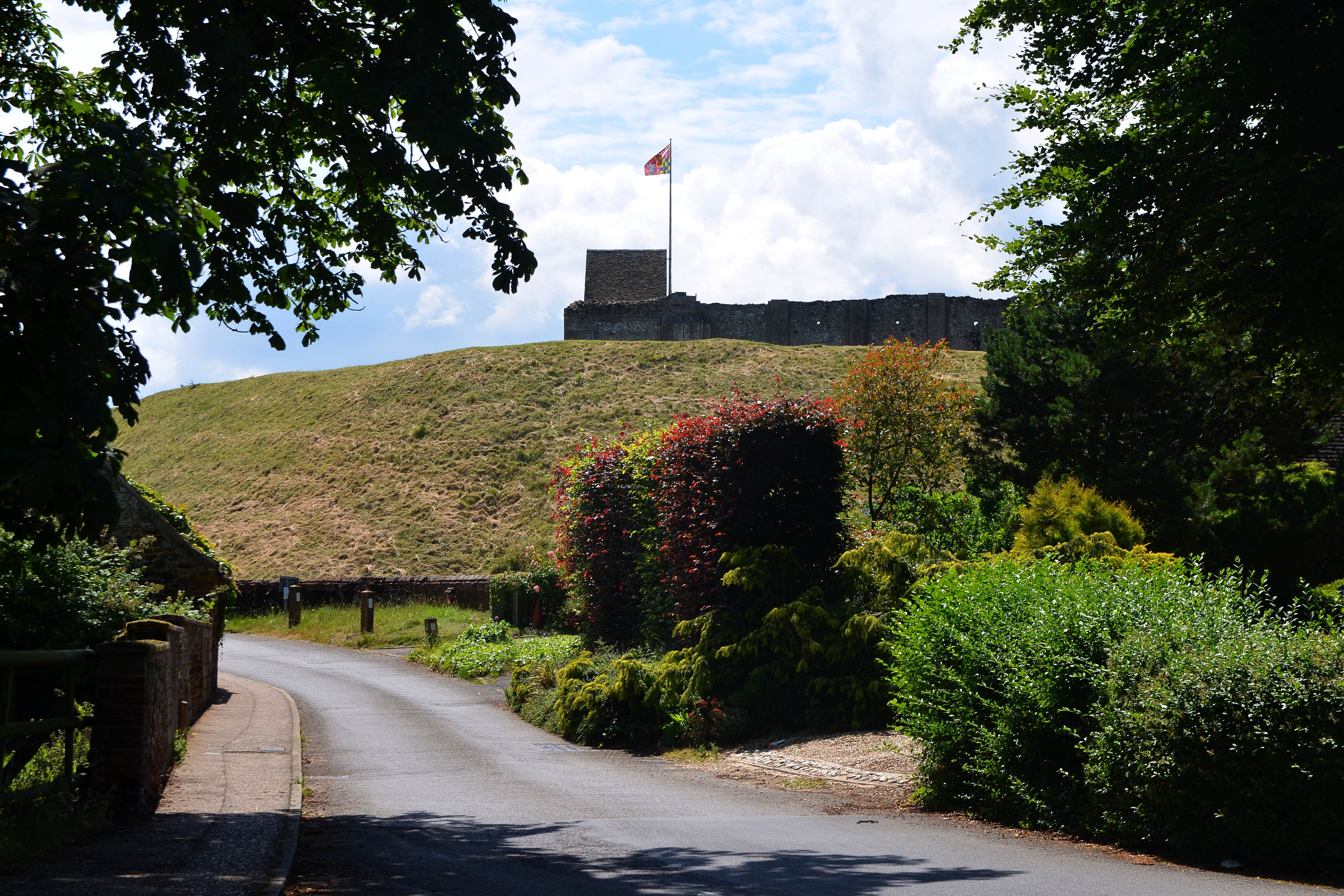
View of Castle Rising Castle from the surrounding village

Castle Rising's parish church is dedicated to Saint Lawrence and was built in the 12th century on the orders of William d'Aubigny. It is Grade I listed. The church was restored first by Anthony Salvin in the 1840s and subsequently by George Edmund Street in the 1860s, both at the expense of Fulk Greville Howard. It has a carved 12th century font and has stained-glass designed by William Wailes.

== In popular culture ==
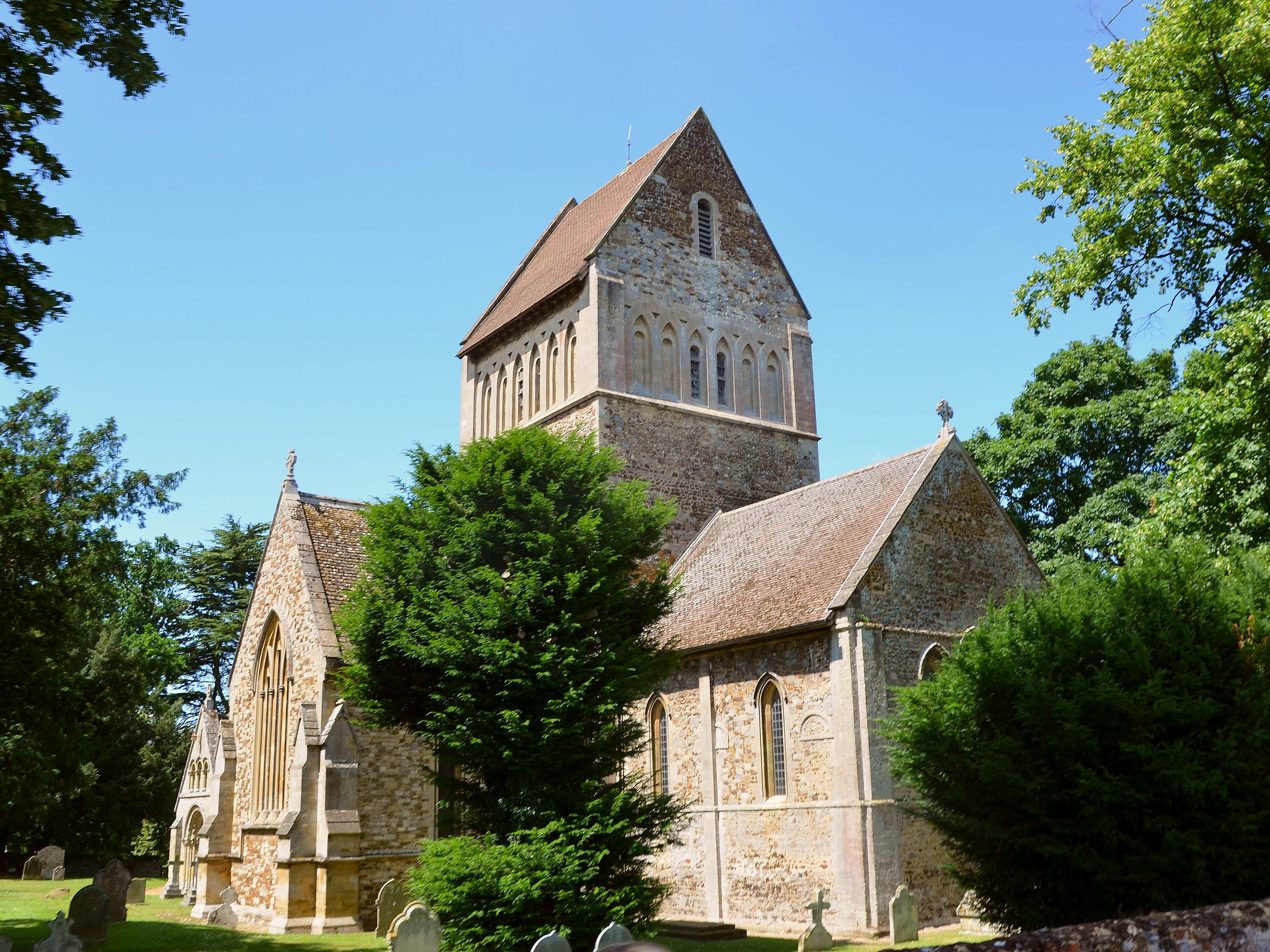
Castle Rising church in July 2017

Castle Rising appeared as a Danish village in the 1985 film Out of Africa. It was also the setting for Grass, a 2003 spin-off of The Fast Show.

== Notable people ==
- William d'Aubigny, 1st Earl of Arundel (1109–1176) nobleman, lived at Castle Rising.
- Isabella of France (1295–1358) Queen of England, lived at Castle Rising.
- Colonel Robert Walpole (1650–1700) politician and militia officer, Member of Parliament for Castle Rising.
- Robert Walpole (1676–1745) Prime Minister, Member of Parliament for Castle Rising.
- Fulk Greville Howard (1773–1846) politician and soldier, lived in Castle Rising.
- Horace Farquhar, 1st Earl Farquhar (1844–1923) financier and politician, lived in Castle Rising.
- Ean Campbell (1856–1921) Anglican Bishop, Rector of Castle Rising 1885–1891.
- Greville Howard, Baron Howard of Rising (b.1941) politician, lived at Castle Rising.
- James Donaldson (b.1943) Norfolk cricketer, born in Castle Rising.
