= Montaud =

Montaud is the name of several communes in France:

- Montaud, Hérault
- Montaud, Isère
- Montaud (Loire), a former commune now in Saint-Étienne

== See also ==
- Montaut (disambiguation)
- Montot (disambiguation)
