= Greville Howard =

Greville Howard may refer to:

- Fulk Greville Howard (né Upton; 1773 – 1846), English politician
- Greville Howard (St Ives MP) (1909–1987), British Conservative and National Liberal politician, MP for St Ives 1950–1966
- Greville Howard, Baron Howard of Rising (born 1941), British politician, Conservative Party life peer since 2004
