= Montalto =

Montalto may refer to:

== Places and jurisdictions ==
=== Italy ===
- Montalto (Apuan Alps) (correctly spelled as Monte Alto or Mont'Alto), a mountain located in Tuscany, Italy and part of the Apuan Alps
- Montalto Carpasio, a comune (municipality) in the Province of Imperia in the Italian region Liguria
- Montalto delle Marche, a municipality in the province of Ascoli Piceno, Marche, Italy
  - The former Roman Catholic Diocese of Montalto, with see in the above city
- Montalto di Castro, a municipality in the province of Viterbo, Latium, Italy
- Montalto Dora, a municipality in the province of Turin, Piedmont, Italy
- Montalto Ligure, a municipality in the province of Imperia, Liguria, Italy
- Montalto Pavese, a municipality in the province of Pavia, Lombardy, Italy
- Montalto Uffugo, a municipality in the province of Cosenza, Calabria, Italy
- Castello di Montalto, a castle in the province of Siena, Tuscany, Italy
- Montalto (Aspromonte), an Italian mountain peak

=== New Zealand ===
- Montalto, New Zealand, a locality in the Ashburton District

=== United States ===
- Montalto, a mountain overlooking Thomas Jefferson's plantation Monticello

== People ==
- Duke of Montalto (title), a Spanish hereditary title created on 1 January 1507
  - Gonzalo Fernández de Córdoba (1453–1515)
- Duke of Montalto (defunct), a Spanish hereditary title, also known as Duke of Montalto de Aragón, created on 27 May 1507
  - Ferdinando d' Aragona y Guardato, 1st Duke of Montalto (fl. 1494–1542)
  - Luis Guillermo de Moncada, 7th Duke of Montalto (1614–1672), Spanish noble and Catholic cardinal
- Cardinal Montalto, Pope Sixtus V (1520–1590)
- Elijah Montalto (1567–1616), Marrano physician and polemicist
- Gina Montalto (2003–2018), one of the 17 victims who was killed in the Stoneman Douglas High School shooting
- Gioseffo Danedi (1618–1689), Italian painter known as il Montalto
- Alessandro Peretti di Montalto (1571–1623), Italian Catholic cardinal bishop
- Andrea Baroni Peretti Montalto (1572–1629), Roman Catholic cardinal
- Francesco Peretti di Montalto (1597–1655), Italian Catholic cardinal
- Giacomo Montalto (1864-1934), Italian Republican-inspired socialist, politician and lawyer
- John Attard Montalto (born 1953), Maltese politician
- Adriano Montalto (born 1988), Italian footballer

== Other uses ==
- Palazzo Montalto, also known as Palazzo Mergulese-Montalto, is a late 14th-century palace on the island of Ortygia in Syracuse, Sicily
- Castello di Montalto, located at east of Siena, Italy
- Montalto di Castro Nuclear Power Station, a nuclear power plant at Montalto di Castro in Italy
- Montalto Di Castro Airfield, an abandoned World War II military airfield, located in the province of Viterbo, Italy

== See also ==
- Montaldo (disambiguation)
- Monthaut, a commune in the Aude department, France
- Montaut (disambiguation)
- Montaud (disambiguation)
- Montalt (disambiguation)
