= Coppanagh =

- Location within island of Ireland

Highest point
- Elevation: 365 m (1,198 ft)
- Prominence: 210 m (690 ft)
- Listing: Marilyn
- Coordinates: 52°32′20.4″N 7°2′27.6″W

Naming
- Native name: Sliabh Chopanaí

Geography
- Location: County Kilkenny, Ireland
- Topo map: OSi Discovery 68

Coppanagh (Irish: Sliabh Chopanaí) is a hill in County Kilkenny, Ireland. At 365 metres (1,198 ft) it is the second highest summit in County Kilkenny behind Brandon Hill and the 886th highest summit in Ireland. Both Coppanagh and Brandon Hill are situated near Mount Alto.

== See also ==
- Geography of Ireland
- List of mountains in Ireland
