= Thomas Mackenzie, Lord Mackenzie =

Scottish judge (1807-1889)

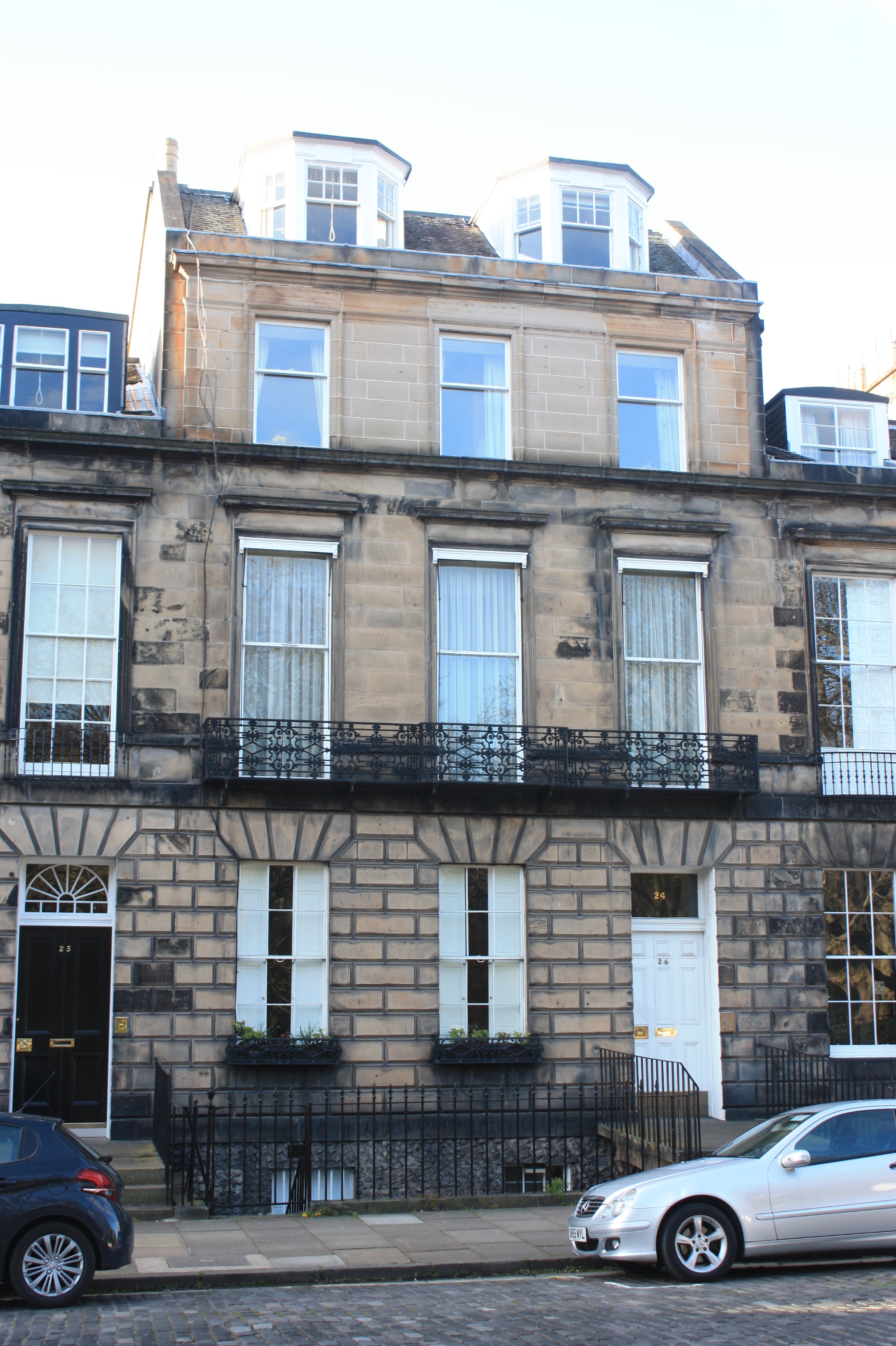
24 Heriot Row, Edinburgh

The Hon Thomas Mackenzie, Lord Mackenzie (1807-1889) was a Scottish judge who rose to be a Senator of the College of Justice.

== Life ==
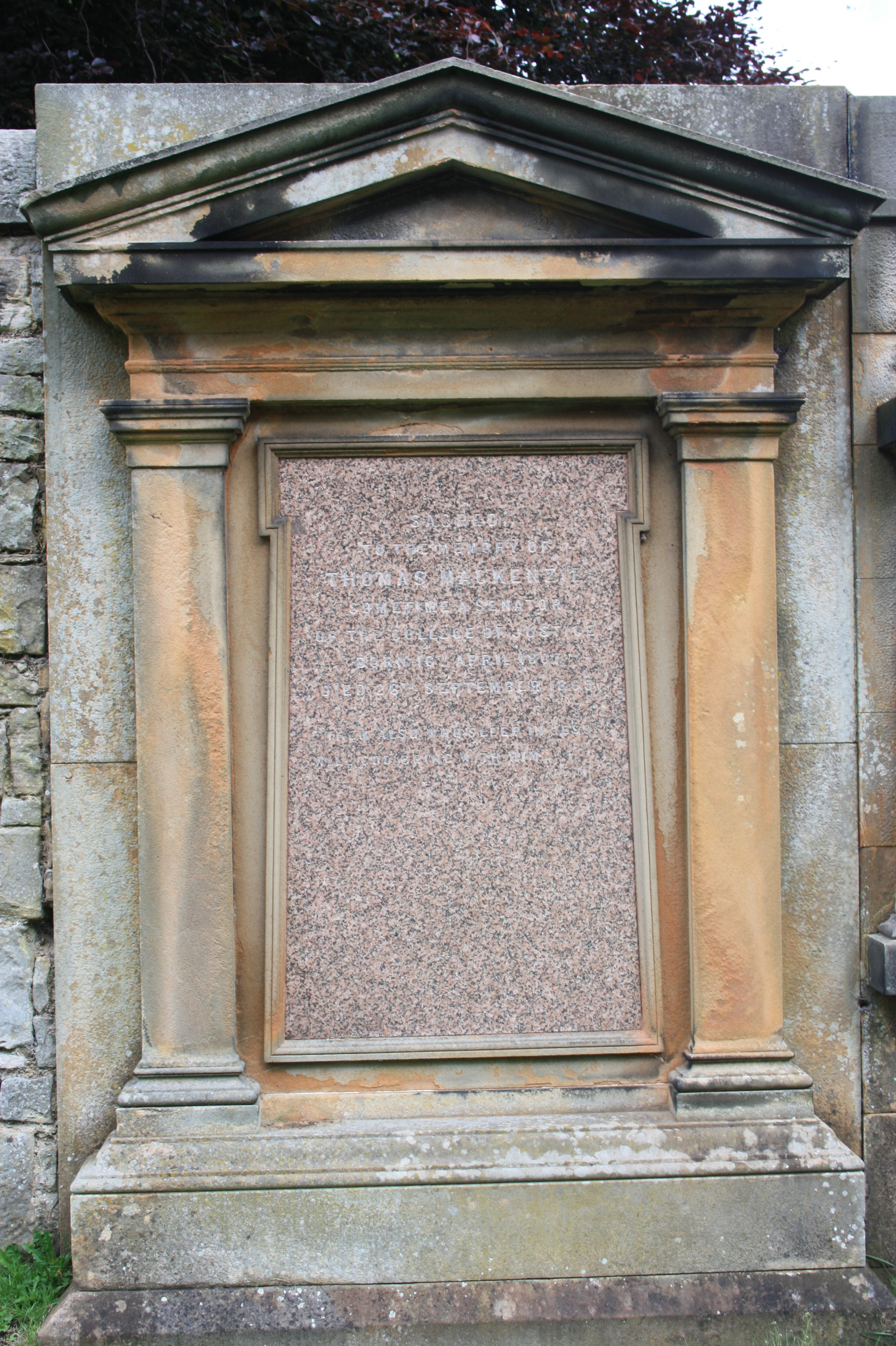
The grave of Thomas Mackenzie, Lord Mackenzie, Dean Cemetery, Edinburgh

He was born in Perth on 16 April 1807 the son of George Mackenzie (shoemaker). He was educated at Perth Academy then studied Law first at St Andrews University then at Edinburgh. He qualified for the Scottish bar as an advocate in 1832 aged 25. He advanced rapidly largely due to the patronage of the Hon Andrew Rutherfurd, Lord Rutherfurd, to whom he acted as a junior.

In 1851 he became Sheriff of Ross and Cromarty. In January 1855 he was appointed Solicitor General of Scotland and later the same month was created a Senator of the College of Justice with the title of "Lord Mackenzie". At this stage he lived at 24 Heriot Row in Edinburgh.

He retired in 1864 and died at home on Heriot Row in Edinburgh on 26 September 1869 aged 62. He is buried with his family on the original north wall of Dean Cemetery, towards the north-west corner, backing onto the first north extension.

== Publications ==
- Studies in Roman Law (1862)
