= Montaldo (surname) =

Montaldo is an Italian surname.

- Antoniotto di Montaldo (1368–1398), Doge of the Republic of Genoa
- Carlos Montaldo (1940–2025), Argentine rower
- Giuliano Montaldo (1930–2023), Italian film director
- Leonardo Montaldo (1319–1384), 7th doge of the Republic of Genoa
- Stefano Montaldo, Italian mathematician

== See also ==
- Montaldo (disambiguation)
