= James Donaldson (cricketer) =

English cricketer

Personal information
- Full name: James Andrew Donaldson
- Born: 27 August 1943; Castle Rising, Norfolk, England
- Died: 10 April 2025 (aged 81)
- Batting: Left-handed

Domestic team information
- Years: Team
- 1963–1971: Norfolk

Career statistics
Competition	List A
Matches	2
Runs scored	37
Batting average	18.50
100s/50s	0/0
Top score	21
Catches/stumpings	1/–
- Source: Cricinfo, 29 June 2011

James Andrew Donaldson (27 August 1943 – 10 April 2025) was an English cricketer. Donaldson was a left-handed batsman. He was born in Castle Rising, Norfolk.

Donaldson made his debut for Norfolk in the 1962 Minor Counties Championship against Cambridgeshire. Donaldson played Minor counties cricket for Norfolk from 1962 to 1971, which included 29 Minor Counties Championship appearances. He made his List A debut against Cheshire in the 1968 Gillette Cup. Opening the batting, he was dismissed for 16 runs by Anthony Shillinglaw. He made a further List A appearance against Yorkshire in the 1969 Gillette Cup. Opening the batting alongside Graham Saville, he scored 21 runs before being dismissed by Chris Old.

Donaldson died on 10 April 2025 at the age of 81.
