= Montaldo =

Montaldo may refer to:

- Montaldo (surname), an Italian surname

== Places in Piedmont, Italy ==
- Montaldo Bormida a commune in the Province of Alessandria
- Montaldo di Mondovì a commune in the Province of Cuneo
- Montaldo Roero a commune in the Province of Cuneo
- Montaldo Scarampi a commune in the Province of Asti
- Montaldo Torinese a commune in the Province of Turin
- Montaldo, a locality of the commune of Cerrina Monferrato in the Province of Alessandria
- Montaldo, a locality of the commune of Spigno Monferrato in the Province of Alessandria
- Montaldo Cosola, a locality of the commune of Cabella Ligure in the Province of Alessandria

== See also ==
- Montaldeo, a commune in the Province of Alessandria, Piedmont
- Montalto (disambiguation)
