= Montaut =

Montaut may refer to:

== People ==
- Eustace de Montaut or Monte Alto or Montalt (c.1027–1112), Breton soldier and English nobleman
- Hugh de Montaut or Monte Alto or Montalt (c.1050–1130), English nobleman

== Places ==
=== France ===
Montaut is the name or part of the name of the following communes in France:

- Montaut, Ariège, in the Ariège department
- Montaut, Dordogne, in the Dordogne department
- Montaut, Haute-Garonne, in the Haute-Garonne department
- Montaut, Gers, in the Gers department
- Montaut, Landes, in the Landes department
- Montaut, Lot-et-Garonne, in the Lot-et-Garonne department
- Montaut, Pyrénées-Atlantiques, in the Pyrénées-Atlantiques department
- Montaut-les-Créneaux, in the Gers department
- Cazeneuve-Montaut, in the Haute-Garonne department

== See also ==
- Monthault, a commune in the Ille-et-Vilaine department, Brittany, France
- Montalt (disambiguation)
- Montalto
