= Bernard de Monte Alto =

Scottish knight

Sir Bernard de Monte Alto (de Mowat) was a Scottish knight who took part in the War of Scottish Independence, as a supporter of Robert de Brus.

Bernard was the son of Roger de Monte Alto, Sheriff of Cromarty and the younger brother of William de Monte Alto. He was with Robert the Bruce at the Battle of Methven on 19 June 1306 and was captured by English forces under Aymer de Valence, Earl of Pembroke. He was drawn and hanged at Newcastle upon Tyne on 4 August 1306. Bernard was executed for bearing arms against King Edward I of England on the side of Robert de Brus, fighting at the Battle of Methven, and killing Roger de Tany, the king's valet, in Selkirk Forest.
