= Castello di Montalto =

Castle in Tuscany, Italy

Coordinates: 43.368152°N 11.547017°E

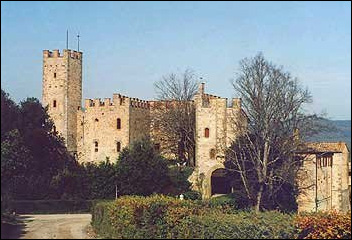
View of Montalto castle from the access road.

The castle of Montalto lies east of Siena, Italy, in an area known as ‘la Berardenga’, which is an extensive territory in the Chianti region of Tuscany. Its position right on the border between the territories of Siena and Florence gave it great strategic importance during the 13th, 14th and 15th centuries. Much of the castle is from medieval times and parts date back to 1000 or earlier; extensive restorations were performed in the 16th century and again in the 19th century.

== Description ==
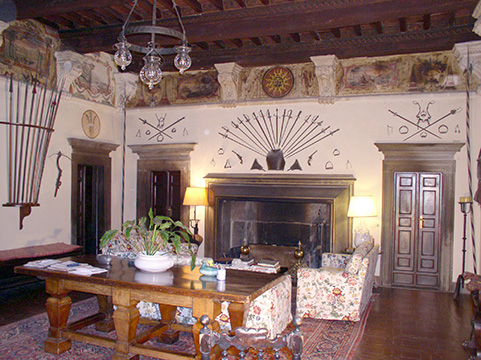
The main hall of Montalto Castle.

Montalto stands on a hill overlooking the upper Ambra river. An entry archway surmounted by a turret leads into a courtyard with a well. To the right is the church of San Martino, and a fresco on the inside of the entry tower depicts the famous scene of the saint sharing his cloak with a beggar. To the left is a loggia with four arches from which one has access to the main villa and the Sala d’Armi (Hall of Arms) with its large fireplace and collection of lances, armor and weapons dating from the 14th century onward. The upper portion of the walls in the Sala d’Armi is decorated with frescoes depicting farmhouses belonging to the castle in the 16th century and vignettes of every-day activities on the land of the Berardenga (hunting, farming, etc.).

The watchtower has loop-holes and ramparts which hint to the castle's past as a stronghold on the highly contested border between the rivaling towns of Siena and Florence.

The complex includes six other buildings and is surrounded by a wall of stone and brick attesting to repeated war damage and reconstructions. Ground fill within the wall circle brings ground level to within 1 meter of the top of the wall on the inner side.

== History ==
=== Early times ===
The tower appears to have been constructed by the Longobards in the 6th or 7th century, but the main part of the castle was erected during the first millennium by early descendants of Winigis, the first count of Siena under the Franks in the 9th century, and his son Berard from whom the Berardenga land takes its name. There are many references to the Berardeschi (= descendants of Berard) family in documents relating to Montalto, the area surrounding it, and the nearby Monastery of San Salvatore a Fontanabuona that was founded by Winigis in 867 and later expanded by his sons Raineri and Berard.

The earliest extant documents regarding the castle are from the 11th century, and imply that Montalto was already a well-established community by then. A census document from 1202 shows over 40 families living in its court (which included not only the castle but the land belonging to it as well). However, there are a number of documents between 1104 and 1212 registering donations and sales of land to others (including the nearby Monastery), indicating perhaps that the Berardeschi family may have been encountering increasing economic difficulties.

=== The battle of Montalto ===
Montalto overlooked an important medieval road that was a gateway to the Mediterranean Sea for Arezzo’s territories, and was of great strategic importance to Siena because of its position right on the border between the lands of Siena and those of Florence and its allies.

The Florentines aimed to put all of Tuscany under their control; Siena on its part wished not only to retain its independence, but also to annex the town of Montepulciano which controlled the main trading route between France and Rome. From 1201 to 1553 Florence and Siena were eternally at war with each other, and the castle of Montalto was therefore often under attack.

Most notably, the greatest damage to the castle occurred during the so-called Battle of Montalto, which took place in June 1208. There are discrepant reports on how the battle started: one historian recounts that Siena had Montepulciano under siege, and Florence intended to come to the besieged city’s aid; on their way, the Florentine troops attacked Montalto, Siena’s main outpost in the area, and Siena came to the castle’s aid. Another claims that Siena’s troops were on their way to Montepulciano when the Florentines overtook them in the vicinity of Montalto. Others simply state that the two cities came to arms at Montalto. Either way, the resulting battle was fierce and devastating. Both sides lost many men, but Siena suffered the heaviest blow; Florence took more than 1200 prisoners, and the castle was almost entirely destroyed. The Florentines reportedly boasted that “Montalto has been flattened, Montalto is an empty name”.

The castle was so severely damaged that the Berardeschi appealed to Siena for help in restoring and enlarging the walls. Siena agreed to a loan because of the strategic importance of the castle.

=== The endless war between Siena and Florence ===
In 1251 Florence again entered Siena's territory, and Siena sent a garrison of 200 men (infantry and knights as well as some mercenaries) as well as 25 days worth of supplies to Montalto and two other fortifications in the area to prepare for one of many military campaigns. By this time the Berardeschi family was in decline, and the castle passed under the direct control of Siena.

Montalto was the site of many other minor battles, mostly between the state of Florence and the republic of Siena, but also at the hand of German and English mercenaries (acting either independently or at the service of Florence) and later French mercenaries allied with the king of Naples. In most cases the Berardenga area was not the marauding armies’ direct object but simply an occasion for plunder on the way to their destination. Witness to these repeated attacks are the numerous requests to Siena on the part of Montalto's inhabitants for financial help in rebuilding its walls or other fortifications.

Variations in the population of the castle and its lands reflect the changes of security. A census conducted to determine tax levies in 1278 shows only 24 families living at Montalto, compared to the over 40 noted in 1202. In 1320 according to a new census Montalto contains 63 “fiscal units”, though it Is unclear whether this refers to families or land. The black plague of 1348 further contributed to depopulation and neglect. A document from 1422 indicates only 13 men were left at Montalto; in 1453 there were 20.

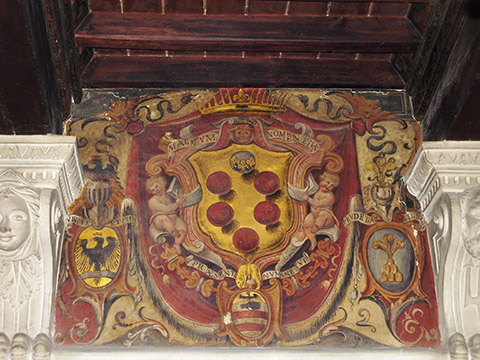
The coat of arms of the Medici family, from a fresco on the upper walls of the Sala d'Armi of Montalto castle.

In addition to financial help, Siena also sent troops and munitions to fortify Montalto on several occasions (as documented in 1402, 1431, 1452, 1478). The castle successfully resisted a siege in 1479; but in 1526 it was reported as occupied by the enemy; in 1529 Montalto was again hosting a garrison from Siena. These repeated battles and changes of control consumed a large amount of resources, damaged crops, and took quite a toll on the castle and its inhabitants.

=== Restoration efforts ===
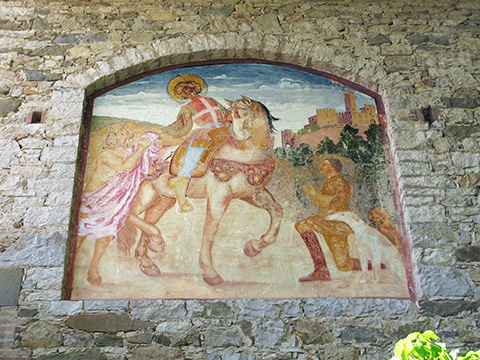
Fresco on the entry tower depicting Saint Martin sharing his cloak with a beggar.

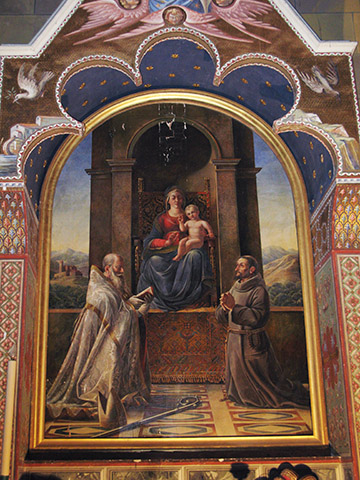
The altarpiece in the church of Saint Martin at Montalto castle was added in 1853.

In 1546 Siena and Florence were still at war, and sir Giovanni Palmieri had little difficulty convincing the government of Siena to cede Montalto to him in exchange for his promise to defend it at his own expense. The cost of rehabilitating the castle would be great, but in exchange Palmieri would own an independent signoria (city-state).

Things were not easy at first: in 1553 Montalto was taken by the Florentines and the Spanish troops of Emperor Charles V (allied with Florence), who then set it on fire before continuing on to nearby San Gusmè. But with the final defeat of Siena in 1554, hostilities ceased between Siena and Florence and the castle finally saw some respite.

Montalto was badly damaged, and its extensive land holdings were neglected and overgrown. Even the church of San Martino results in bad shape and completely bare, as noted in a 1567 pastoral visit report. Francesco and Scipione Palmieri (sons of Giovanni) started to restore the castle in 1570-1572, adding Renaissance-style embellishments such as the graceful portico along the facade facing the courtyard. The chapel was whitewashed and received a new floor and altar furnishings in 1583, though at this point it was no longer an autonomous parish but annexed to the nearby monastery. A series of frescoes depicting coats of arms and life on the estate's sharecropping farms was added in the great hall some time between 1570 and 1587. The estate became the country home of the Palmieri family, whose primary residence was in Siena.

For the following two and a half centuries there is little information about Montalto. A demographic study commissioned in 1676 by the grand duke of Tuscany Cosimo III de' Medici lists 7 housing groups at Montalto for a total of 50 people, 32 of them men (not including the Palmieris themselves). The Catasto Leopoldino land registry of 1830 shows Montalto as owning 5 farm holdings and various parcels of land dedicated to vineyards, crops and woods.

A new restoration was undertaken in the middle of the 19th century by Giuseppe Palmieri and completed by his son Antonio in 1908, in the neo-Gothic style popular at the time. The defensive walls were rebuilt, the watchtower restored to something like its original height, and a new gate tower was built to give entrance to the courtyard. Interior decorations were added to hallways and rooms, depicting the coats of arms of various families related to the Palmieris; a new church, replacing the old one no longer extant, was built and adorned with an altarpiece painted in the Renaissance style by Giuseppe Palmieri in 1853, showing the Madonna and Child flanked by two saints with the castle of Montalto in the background; a fresco was added by Antonio Palmieri on the entry tower, over the Sienese 'arco ribassato', depicting Saint Martin giving his cloak to a ‘poor devil’.

== Present day ==
Starting in the 1950s and continuing through the 1970s, small scale farming in Italy became less profitable and farmers abandoned the land to search for work in larger towns. This agricultural exodus left Montalto without a regular farming staff, and it became a burden to the Palmieri heirs. In 1970 the last members of the Palmieri family, the Princess Sobilia Palmieri Carafa di Roccella and her sister Contessa Vittoria Palmieri Forquet, ceded the castle to the former's cousin Giovanni Coda Nunziante, a professor of agricultural economics from Naples. The land is still cultivated, but to supplement the income from agriculture many abandoned buildings were restored as vacation homes. Currently the estate is used for organic farming and for “Agriturismo” (vacation rentals in a country/farm setting).

=== Organic farming ===
The current estate farm is certified organic and encompasses an area of 270 hectares, about 650 acres (2.6 km^{2}). While two thirds are woodlands, the rest is cultivated. Annual crops include wheat, sunflowers, alfalfa, canola and others, depending on the year. A portion of the land is planted in olive groves. Montalto's lands are also used for honey production by local bee keepers.

== Sources ==
- L. Douglas, “History of the Republic of Siena”, Rome 1969
- V. Passeri, “Città, borghi e castelli dell’area senese-grossetana”, Siena 1984
- G.A. Pecci, “Lo Stato di Siena antico e moderno”, 1767
- E. Repetti, “Dizionario geografico, fisico, storico della Toscana,” Firenze 1839
- G. Righi Parenti, “La Storia del Chianti,” Siena 1980
- G. Tommasi, “Historiae di Siena,” Venezia 1625
