= Mount Alto, Kilkenny =

Mountain in Ireland

Coordinates: 52°28′N 7°04′W

Mount Alto
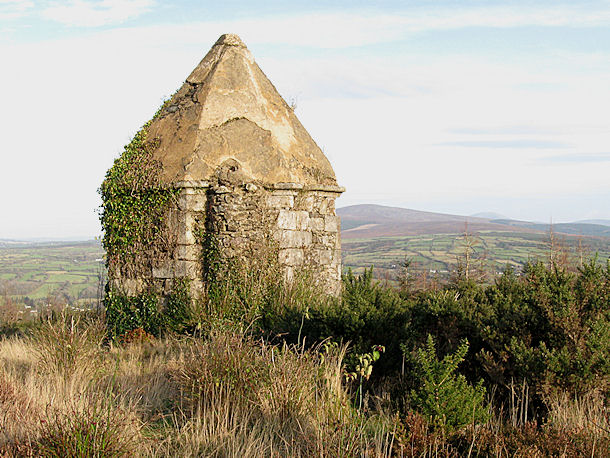
- Mount Alto viewing tower, located about 400m N of the summit

Highest point
- Elevation: 276 m (906 ft)
- Prominence: 149 m (489 ft)
- Listing: Marilyn

Naming
- Native name: Cnoc Ruairí

Geography
- Location within island of Ireland
- Location: County Kilkenny, Ireland
- Topo map: OSi Discovery 76

Geology
- Mountain type: Granite

Mount Alto (Irish: Cnoc Ruairí, meaning 'Rory's hill') is a mountain in County Kilkenny, Ireland.

== Geography ==
At 276 metres (906 feet), it is the 981st highest mountain in Ireland. It is situated near Brandon Hill and Coppanagh.

== See also ==
- List of mountains in Ireland
