= Montot =

Montot is the name of the following communes in France:

- Montot, Côte-d'Or, in the Côte-d'Or department
- Montot, Haute-Saône, in the Haute-Saône department
- Montot-sur-Rognon, in the Haute-Marne department
