= Henry Harrod =

British antiquarian (1817–1871)

Henry Harrod (1817–1871) was an English lawyer and antiquary.

== Life ==
Harrod was born at Aylsham in Norfolk on 30 September 1817, and educated at Norwich. He was admitted an attorney in Michaelmas term 1838, and for many years was in practice at Norwich.

In 1862 Harrod moved to Marlborough, and entered into partnership with Richard Henry Holloway, solicitor. In 1865 he went to 4 Victoria Street, Westminster, where he became a professional antiquary. He was working on a monograph on the Tower of London when he died at 2 Rectory Grove, Clapham, Surrey, on 24 January 1871, and was buried at West Norwood Cemetery. His wife was the eldest daughter of Colonel Franklin Head.

== Works ==
Harrod was for twelve years secretary to the Norfolk and Norwich Archæological Society, and contributed papers to their Transactions. During this period he collected the information which in 1857 he published in Gleanings among the Castles and Convents of Norfolk. It combined documentary evidence with proofs from architectural details, the illustrations being from his own drawings.

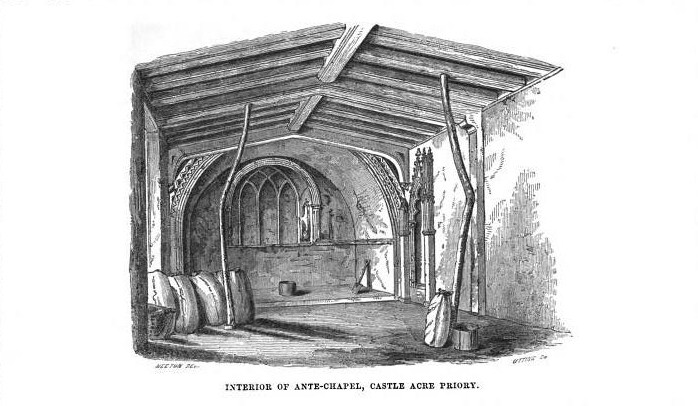
Ante-chapel of Castle Acre Priory, engraving from Gleanings among the Castles and Convents of Norfolk (1857) by Henry Harrod

On 16 March 1854 Harrod was named a fellow of the Society of Antiquaries of London, for whose Proceedings he wrote some articles, mainly on matters connected with Norfolk. He was also a contributor to Archæologia, his first paper, read on 3 May 1855, being On some Horse-trapping found at Westhall.

Harrod was noted for his skill in deciphering old documents, and was employed in arranging the records of Norwich, King's Lynn, and other boroughs. The New England Historic and Genealogical Society elected him a corresponding member.
