= William de Monte Alto =

Scottish noble (died 1327)

Arms of William de Monte Alto

Sir William de Monte Alto of Ferne, also known as William de Mohaut (d.1327) was a 13th–14th century Scottish noble.

William was the son of Roger de Monte Alto and the brother of Bernard de Monte Alto.

In 1296, William pledged homage to King Edward I of England at Inverness and his seal is appended to the Ragman Roll. William held Cromarty Castle on behalf of the Scots, as Constable and sheriff, from 1297 until 1304, when he surrendered the castle to the English. He pledged homage again to Edward I in 1304 at St Andrews. By 1305, William was given back the heritable position of Sheriff of Cromarty. He appears to have sided with Robert de Brus in 1306 and was a signatory of the Declaration of Arbroath in 1320.

He died in 1327 during the Scottish siege of Norham Castle. He was succeeded by his son William.
