= Eustace de Montaut =

Breton soldier and baron

Eustace de Montaut (or Monte Alto)
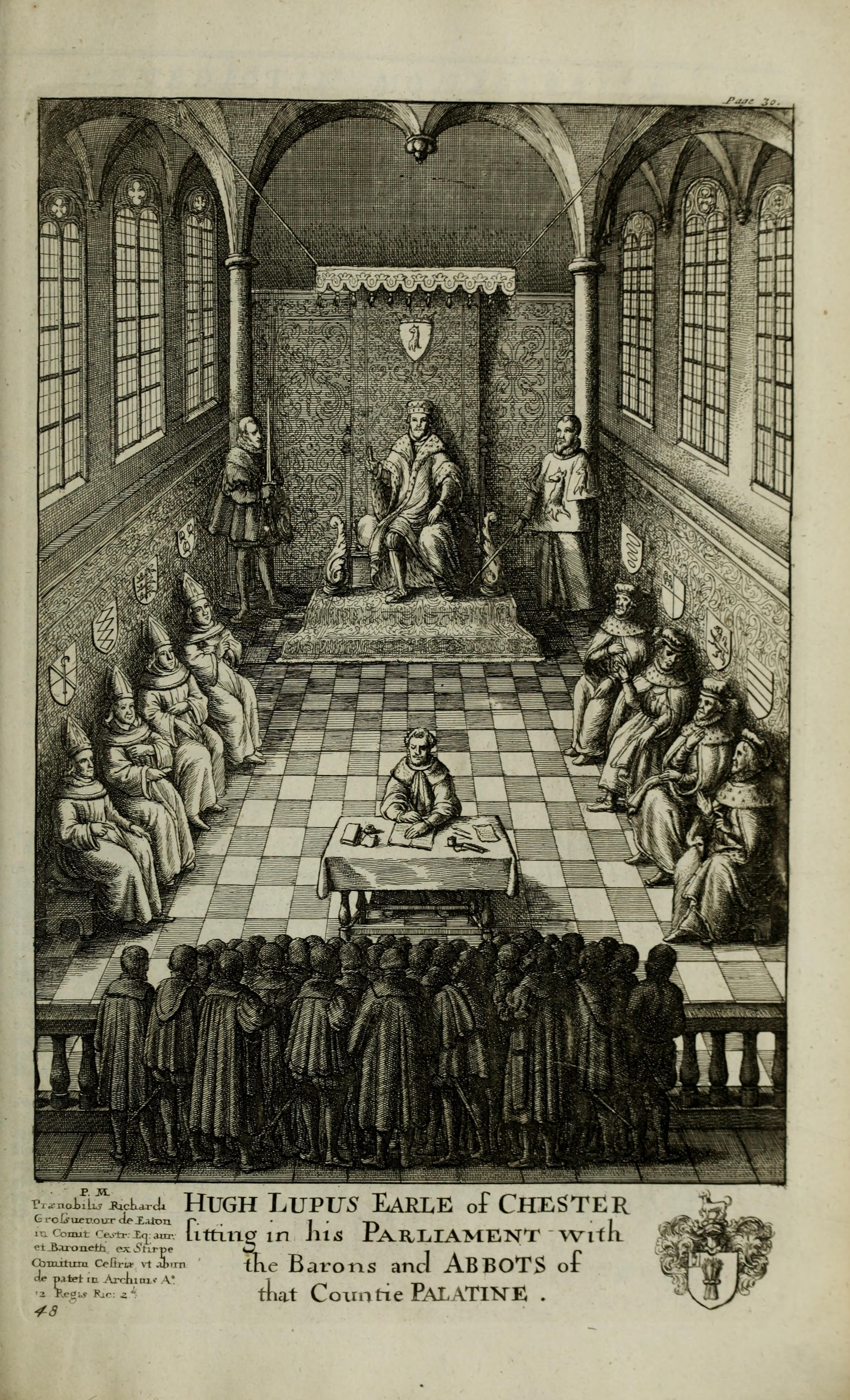
- The court of Hugh Lupus. Eustace may be seated on the right, second from front.
- Successor: Hugh de Montaut
- Born: c. 1010s–1030s May have been Monthault, Ille-et-Vilaine, Duchy of Brittany
- Died: Cheshire, England
- Spouse: Unknown
- Issue: Hugh, Roger, Ralph, possibly Peter

Eustace de Montaut, or Monte Alto, Montalt, Monhaut, or FitzNorman (c. 1027 – 1112), was a Breton soldier, and later baron, who fought on the side of the Normans during the Norman Conquest of England in 1066 and for his achievements was granted several manors by the new king, William the Conqueror.

== Biography ==
Eustace was born in the early to mid-11th century, possibly in Monthault, Ille-et-Vilaine, Brittany, to parents whose names are not recorded. Some historians have identified him as Eustace III, Count of Boulogne, but it is most likely that they were separate people. It has often been claimed that Eustace's family were originally the Lords of Montalto in Italy, but there is no evidence of this, and it may simply be based on the Latin form of "de Montaut, "de Monte Alto". Eustace came to England in the years following the Norman Conquest, aiding Hugh Lupus in his conflict with the Welsh.

Eustace united his forces with those of Hugh Lupus, and together succeeded in subduing the Welsh in the county of Flintshire. Hugh Lupus and Eustace shared the lands they gained, with Eustace receiving the manors of Montalt and Hawarden—both of which are still ruled by his descendants.

Eustace died at an unknown date and was succeeded by his eldest son, Hugh de Montaut.

== Family ==
The identity of any wife of Eustace has not been recorded. Eustace had at least three sons: Hugh, Roger, and Ralph (or Ranulph). Some sources also mention another son, Peter, Seneschal of Chester.
