= Robert de Montalt, 1st Baron Montalt =

English noble

Coat of arms of Robert de Montalt, Lord of Hawarden, Azure, a lion rampant Argent..

Robert de Montalt, 1st Baron Montalt (1270–1329), Lord of Mold and Hawarden, was an English noble. He was a signatory of the Baron's Letter to Pope Boniface VIII in 1301.

He was the son of Robert de Montalt and Joan de Mowbray, and was the younger brother of Roger de Montalt, 1st Baron Montalt.

Montalt married Emma, widow of Richard FitzJohn (died 1297) (son of John Fitz Geoffrey, Justice of Ireland). They had no issue.

Robert served in the Scottish and Gascon wars of Edward I and Edward II. De Montalt was summoned to Parliament as Baron Montalt in 1299. His summons as Baron Montalt was not a continuation of the 1297 barony, but a new creation.

At his death in 1329, the barony became extinct. He settled his lands on Queen Isabella (mother of King Edward III and thereafter to John of Eltham, brother of Edward III. His wife Emma survived him.

== Citations ==
Peerage of England
New creation	Baron Montalt; 1299–1329	Extinct
