= Baron Montalt =

Extinct barony in the Peerage of England

Coat of arms of Baron Montalt, Azure, a lion rampant Argent..

Baron Montalt (sometimes given as Mohault or Mohaut) was a title that was created twice in the Peerage of England.

== History ==
The first creation of the title was for Roger de Montalt, who was summoned to parliament on 23 June 1295. On his death two years later, the barony became extinct. The second creation was for Robert de Montalt, who was summoned to parliament on 6 February 1299. He was the younger brother of the first baron of the 1295 creation. On his death thirty years later, the barony became extinct. He died of his wounds after fighting a duel against Robert de Mablethorpe. (He was the son and heir of Sir William of Mablethorpe, lord of the manor of Mablethorpe, Lincolnshire, which was located on the site of the present Mablethorpe Hall) at Earls Bridge on the outskirts of Mablethorpe Lincolnshire. Both men died of their wounds. Robert de Montalt was buried at All Saints Church in Maltby le Marsh. He was buried in the chancel; his tomb has an effigy of a cross-legged knight wearing chain mail and surcoat. At his head are two angels by the pillow and at his feet, two lions biting each other.

Robert de Mablethorpe was buried at St Mary's Church, Mablethorpe. There is an effigy of Sir Robert in the chancel of the church; the head of the figure rests on a pillow upheld by angels, and beneath the feet are two dragons engaged in fierce combat. The tail of the one impaled by the spur of the knight, with the foot resting on the back of the other.

The De Montalts and the De Mablethorpes were two of Mablethorpe's most noble families; however, the two families were engaged in a feud which had lasted 96 years after their ancestors had quarreled over which family would present the next rectors of Saint Mary's and Saint Peter's Parish Churches. The feud started when Roger de Montalt and Thomas son of Endo de Mablethorpe in 1233, had quarrelled about the right of presenting the Rector of St Mary's and a decision was made that Thomas should present the new Rector, Richard de Wyverton.

The feud concluded when on 26 December 1329, Robert de Montalt met Robert de Mablethorpe on the bridge (two miles from the west of Mablethorpe), Robert De Montalt had accused Robert De Mablethorpe of cowardice in battle and told him to get out of his way, Robert De Mablethorpe resented the unjust remarks and refused to move, Robert De Montalt began to have doubts, but he did not dare to withdraw the charge as if he did, his five-week bride would think him afraid.

The duel would settle the matter and whoever survived the duel would gain "satisfaction", by restoring one's honour by demonstrating a willingness to risk one's life for it. The De Montalts stood on the Maltby-le-Marsh side of Earls Bridge and the Mablethorpes stood on the side nearest to Mablethorpe. The two Earls duelled with ghastly determination and both men understood, one of the earls had to kill the other, and that one of them would not be crossing the bridge alive. Records state that both earls attacked each other like lions. They were evenly matched and experienced in weapons and the harsh cry of swords against armour lasted for hours, but at last a sword stroke from each took its toll, and at the same time the two knights fell dead together.

Robert de Montalt's nephew Robert de Morley inherited his uncle's lands. Robert De Mablethorpe's daughter Elizabeth, who was married to Thomas Fitzwilliam of Sprotbrough near Doncaster in Yorkshire, inherited her father's manor and lands in Mablethorpe. The FitzWilliam family lived at Mablethorpe for 290 years.

The Montalt Manor and lands once owned by the Montalt family and the advowson of St Marys that went with it changed hands frequently. It is not difficult to suggest the reasons why this occurred. Serious flooding took place again during this period and much farm land must have been destroyed, making Mablethorpe and district very poor.

In 1332, a subsidy roll was made; in that year a tax was lived on freeholders, Sokemen and the wealthier villains. Only seven places in Lindsey had more than 100 taxpayers. In August 1335 the sea broke through the banks off Mablethorpe causing flooding, drowning sheep and cows and destroying crops. This flood lasted two or more days.

When Robert Morley presented one of his relations named William to be chaplain of the chantry chapel of Saint Lawrence at St Mary's Church, William was assigned the task of praying for the souls of the dead and's family. This was probably due to the founding the chantry in 1316.

In 1335, of serious flooding when King Edward III of England confirmed an agreement whereby Robert Morley was granted permission to exchange the Montalt manor of Mablethorpe for Queens Isabella's manor of Framsden in Suffolk. The agreement also stated that she acquired rent and services of land held by Elizabeth de Malberthorp and her husband Thomas FlitzWwilliam III (Elizabeth had inherited her father's Roberts Manor and lands). Queen Isabel had purchased the Montalt Manor to spend time with the FitzWilliams as they were related to the Plantagenets through the blood line of King Henry II's half-brother Hamelin de Gatinais.

== Baron Montalt (1295) ==
- Roger de Montalt, 1st Baron Montalt (1st creation) (1265–1297)

== Baron Montalt (1299) ==
- Robert de Montalt, 1st Baron Montalt (2nd creation) (1270–1329)

== See also ==
- Earl de Montalt
