= Roger de Montalt, 1st Baron Montalt =

Coat of arms of Roger de Montalt, Lord of Mold, Azure, a lion rampant Argent..

Roger de Montalt, 1st Baron Montalt (1265–1297) (aka Monte Alto) was a baron who rebelled for a time against Henry III of England. Roger was one of the sons of Sir Robert de Monaut, Knight (born 1230, married 1261, died 1275 in Arden, Cheshire). Robert married Joan Mowbray. Joan (1247–1284) was born in Pontefract, W-Riding, Yorkshire (daughter of Roger Mowbray). Roger was the brother of another Robert de Montalt.

Montalt was one of the defenders of Cambridge for King Henry III. During the reign of Edward I, he served overseas in the Gascon wars. In 1295, he was summoned to Parliament as a baron.

Roger Montalt married Juliana, a daughter of Roger de Clifford, but they had no surviving children.

When Montalt died in 1297, his estates passed to his younger brother Robert (1270-1329), and his barony became extinct. A new creation of the Montalt barony was created by writ of summons in 1299, for his brother Robert de Montalt.

Peerage of England
New creation	Baron Montalt; 1295–1297	Extinct
