= Sheriff of Ross, Cromarty and Sutherland =

The Sheriff of Ross, Cromarty and Sutherland was historically responsible for enforcing law and order in Ross-shire, Cromartyshire and Sutherland in Scotland.

The area was part of the shire of Inverness from the 12th century. A Sheriff of Cromarty existed from the mid-13th century, initially with a relatively small jurisdiction around the town of Cromarty, subsequently enlarged in the late 17th century to include various other tracts of land scattered across the province of Ross. There are a couple of references to a Sheriff of Ross in the 15th century, but the position was not permanently established until 1662, after an act of parliament of 1661 separated Ross-shire from Inverness-shire.

The two counties shared a sheriff from 1748, known as the Sheriff of Ross and Cromarty. From 1870 the sheriff was also shared with the neighbouring county of Sutherland, becoming the Sheriff of Ross, Cromarty and Sutherland. Following a further reorganisation in 1946 it became the Sheriff of Inverness, Moray, Nairn & Ross & Cromarty.

== Sheriffs of Cromarty ==
The position of the sheriff of Cromarty was a heritable position.

- William de Monte Alto (1266)
- William de Monte Alto (1296-1304), (1305-?)
- William III, Earl of Ross (c. 1345)
- Adam Urquhart (1365)
- William Urquhart (c.1470)
- Alexander Urquhart (1497)

== Sheriffs of Ross ==
- 1493: Hugh Ross of Balnagowan
- 1499: David Ross of Balnagowan

Position re-established 1662

- 1662–1678: Kenneth Mackenzie, 3rd Earl of Seaforth
- 1678–1689: Kenneth Mackenzie, 4th Earl of Seaforth
- 1689–1696: David Ross of Balnagowan
- 1696–1706: Sir Robert Munro of Foulis
- 1706–1710: Hugh Rose, 15th of Kilravock
- 1710–1712: Roderick Mackenzie
- 1715–1722: Hugh Rose, 15th of Kilravock
- c.1722–1725: Sir William Gordon, 1st Baronet
- 1725–1729: Sir Robert Munro of Foulis
- 1729–1732: Hugh Rose, 15th of Kilravock
- 1732–1734: Hugh Rose, 16th of Kilravock

== Sheriffs of Ross and Cromarty (1748) ==
- 1748–1772: Hugh Rose of Geddes
- 1773–1774: William Mackenzie of Balmaduthy
- 1774–1833: Donald Macleod of Geanies
- 1835–1850: John Jardine
- 1850–1851: George Deas
- 1851–1855: Thomas Mackenzie
- 1855–1859: George Moir
- 1859–1869: Alexander Shank Cook
- 1869–1870: Alexander Moncrieff

== Sheriffs of Ross, Cromarty and Sutherland (1870) ==
- 1870–1874: George Dingwall Fordyce
- 1875–1876: John Macdonald
- 1877–1881: John Pettigrew Wilson
- 1881–1886: William Mackintosh
- 1886–1889: John Cheyne, KC
- 1889–1890: Alexander Low
- 1890–1891: Andrew Jameson, Lord Ardwall (Sheriff of Perth, 1891)
- 1891–1898: Henry Johnston (Sheriff of Angus, 1898–1905)
- 1898–1900: William Charles Smith, KC
- 1900-1907: Charles John Guthrie, KC
- 1907–1912: John Alexander Reid, KC
- 1912–1940: James Mackintosh, KC
- 1946: Ross and Cromarty merged into the new sheriffdom of Inverness, Moray, Nairn & Ross & Cromarty. Sutherland merged into Sheriffdom of Caithness, Sutherland, Orkney & Zetland

== See also ==
- Historical development of Scottish sheriffdoms
