= Greville Howard, Baron Howard of Rising =

British Conservative politician

The Right Honourable The Lord Howard of Rising

Member of the House of Lords
- Lord Temporal
- Life peerage 4 June 2004

Personal details
- Born: 22 April 1941 (age 85)

Greville Patrick Charles Howard, Baron Howard of Rising (born 22 April 1941) is a British Conservative politician and, before the 2010 general election, was variously an Opposition Whip and Shadow Minister for Cabinet Office, for Treasury and for Culture, Media and Sport.

== Early life and career ==
He was educated at Eton College. Between 1968 and 1970, he was Private Secretary to Enoch Powell. Howard was further Director of Keep Trust from 1980 to 1987, of Fortress Trust from 1989 to 1993, and is Director of Fortress Holdings since 1993.

== Political career ==
On 4 June 2004, he was created a life peer as Baron Howard of Rising, of Castle Rising in the County of Norfolk.

He has been a councillor on King's Lynn and West Norfolk Council since 2003.

A Westminster townhouse owned by Howard has been used at various times as a headquarters for Conservative Party political campaigns, including Michael Portillo's 1995 party leadership campaign, Boris Johnson's 2019 party leadership campaign, and most recently Liz Truss's 2022 party leadership campaign.

== Family ==
A member of the influential Howard family, Howard is the son of Lieutenant-Colonel Henry Redvers Greville Howard (1911–1978), the son of Sir Charles Alfred Howard, the second son of the Hon. Greville Howard, who was the second son of Charles Howard, 17th Earl of Suffolk. His mother was Patience, daughter of Lieutenant-Colonel Charles Rice Iltyd Nicholl, TD (1880–1950), a solicitor, army officer and mason.

Lord Howard of Rising has married three times. Firstly he married Zoe Walker, daughter of Douglas Walker, in 1968. Divorced in 1972, he married secondly, Mary Rose Chichester, daughter of Sir John Chichester, 11th Baronet in 1978. After her death in 1980, Howard married again to Mary Cortland Culverwell, daughter of Robert Culverwell, one year later. He has 2 sons and 1 daughter by his third wife. Lord Howard's immediate family consists of 2 sisters. The first is his full sister, Amanda Howard. She married a Mr Simon Burton, an heir to the once well-known Burton clothing company (which became part of the now-defunct Arcadia group). His half-sister Katharine currently resides in Spain. Her son (and therefore Howard's nephew) is the son of the famous 1960s bullfighter Miguel Mateo Salcedo.

Lord Howard is a descendant of William d'Aubigny, 1st Earl of Arundel, who built Castle Rising in about 1138, and he still owns the castle remnants today.

== Arms ==
Coat of arms of the baron Howard of Rising
Crest 1st issuant from a ducal coronet Or a pair of wings Gules each charged with a bend between six cross-crosslets fitchee Argent 2nd on a chapeau Gules turned up Ermine a lion statant guardant with tail extended Or ducally gorged Argent 3rd on a mount Vert a horse passant Argent holding in the mouth a slip of oak fructed Proper. Escutcheon Quarterly 1st Gules a bend between six cross-crosslets fitchee Argent on the bend an escutcheon Or charged with a demi-lion rampant pierced through the mouth with an arrow within a double tressure flory counterflory of the first (Howard) 2nd Gules three lions passant guardant in pale Or and in chief a label of three points Argent (Thomas of Brotherton) 3rd chequy Or and Azure (Warren) 4th Gules a lion rampant Or (Fitzalan) over all at the fess point a triple turreted tower Gold. Supporters On either side a lion Argent each charged with a triple turreted tower Gules. Motto Nous Maintiendrons

== Notes ==
Orders of precedence in the United Kingdom
Preceded by The Lord Tunnicliffe	Gentlemen; Baron Howard of Rising	Followed by The Lord Carter of Coles
