= Hugh de Montaut =

English nobleman and Baron

Hugh de Montaut (or Monte Alto)
- Successor: Roger de Montaut
- Born: c. 1050; Unknown
- Died: Before 1130; Cheshire, England
- Spouse: Unknown
- Issue: William "FitzHugh" de Montaut (or Monte Alto)

Hugh de Montaut, or Monte Alto, Montalt, Monhaut, or FitzNorman (ca. 1050 – 1130), was an English nobleman and Baron under Hugh Lupus during the early years of the reign of William the Conqueror.

== Biography ==
Hugh was born in the mid 11th century, probably in Cheshire or Normandy. His father was Eustace de Montaut, who arrived in England at the time of the Battle of Hastings or shortly after, under the "Palatine Earl of Chester, the potent Hugh Lupus", under whom Hugh would later serve as a Steward and a Baron. Hugh is known for giving a large part of his possessions to monks: granting the lands of Gosetce and Lantrene to the monks of the Abbey of Chester. The name of Hugh's wife is now unknown, but she may have been a Suffolk heiress, and by about 1075 they had at least one son, named William. The names of any other children have not survived. Both Hugh and his wife were deceased by 1130, and Hugh was succeeded in his estates by his brother Roger, which suggests that Hugh's son predeceased him.
