= David Brand, Lord Brand =

British lawyer and judge in Scottish law

The Honourable Lord Brand

Senator of the College of Justice in Scotland
- In office 1990–2005
- Preceded by: Lord Mackenzie Stuart
- Succeeded by: Lord Marnoch

Solicitor General for Scotland
- In office 1970–1972

Personal details
- Born: David William Robert Brand

David William Robert Brand, Lord Brand (21 October 1923 – 14 April 1996) was a British lawyer and judge. He had a conservative outlook on life, and as a judge he had a reputation for both speedy decisions and severe sentences.

His university education was interrupted by service in the British Army during World War II. He then became an advocate, and after a career as a prosecutor, he was a sheriff in southern Scotland from 1968 to 1970. He was Solicitor General for Scotland from 1970 to 1972, and then served from 1972 to 1989 as a Senator of the College of Justice. In 1994, he was briefly an appellate judge in Botswana.

== Early life ==
Brand was born in Edinburgh on 21 October 1923, to a Catholic family from Aberdeenshire. His father was a sheriff-substitute and writer to the Signet, who became Sheriff of Dumfries and Galloway and moved the family to Dumfries, where Brand was raised. His father died when he was nine years old, but with financial assistance from an uncle he was educated at Stonyhurst College near Clitheroe in Lancashire, before entering the University of Edinburgh aged 16.

== World War II ==
In 1942, Brand interrupted his studies to join the army. He was commissioned into the 11th battalion of the Argyll and Sutherland Highlanders, and in 1944 volunteered for transfer to the King's African Rifles. He fought with his regiment in the Burma Campaign, ending the war with the rank of captain.

Long after the war, a former sergeant in the Argylls said of the young officer: "See, yon Brand. He was a very brave lad. Mind you he was clumsy too. Ought to have got an MC."

Brand's experiences in Burma were a formative influence on his approach to criminal justice. Later in life, he told his then Member of Parliament (MP) Tam Dalyell how:

Some of my most formative years were spent in the appalling conditions of Burma in the last years of the Second World War. I was one of the lucky ones: I was neither captured nor killed. But I saw a lot of good men who were and I just think that those for whom they have laid down their lives should jolly well behave themselves. Those whom I have sent to Barlinnie or Saughton do not know how lucky they are compared to those poor bastards despatched to Changi gaol or the Japanese camps.

— Lord Brand, as reported by Tam Dalyell

== Career ==
After the war, Brand finished his studies at the University of Edinburgh. Encouraged by Sir Ernest Wedderburn, a solicitor and former Law Professor at Edinburgh who had befriended him after his father's death, Brand was admitted as an advocate in 1948.

=== Prosecutor and Sheriff ===
In 1951 Brand became Junior Counsel to the Scottish Education Department. Two years later, in 1953, he was appointed as an advocate depute (i.e. a junior prosecutor) in the sheriff courts. In 1955, he took on the same role in the Circuit Court in Glasgow.

In his memoirs, Brand reflected on the role of the advocate-depute:

found the office of advocate-depute most satisfying and in accordance with the best traditions of Scottish law and practice. It is misleading to describe our system as adversarial. The duty of prosecuting counsel is not to obtain a conviction, but to present the Crown case fully and fairly before the jury. He should not hesitate to abandon a prosecution if it becomes clear that a conviction would not be warranted.

— Lord Brand, An Advocate's Tale, page 50.

Brand took silk in 1959, aged 36. From 1959 to 1970 he served as chairman of the Medical Appeal Tribunal, where his humane approach contrasted with his severity in criminal matters. He was promoted to Senior Advocate-Depute in 1964, and to his first judicial post in 1968, as Sheriff of Dumfries and Galloway – an office previously held by his father.

In 1970, he added the post of Sheriff of Roxburgh, Berwick and Selkirk. He described his years as a sheriff principal as the most enjoyable of his career.

=== Solicitor General for Scotland ===
After only two years as a sheriff, Brand was appointed in June 1970 as Solicitor General for Scotland in the newly elected Conservative government of Edward Heath. The successors to his two shrievalties were appointed in July. Both men – Peter Maxwell in Dumfries and Henry Keith in Roxburgh – later became Senators of the College of Justice.

The more senior Scottish law officer, Lord Advocate Norman Wylie, was an MP, so they divided their duties accordingly. Wylie did most of the London-based work, while Brand stayed in Edinburgh to run the Crown Office.

Brand led some high-profile prosecutions, such as the trial of Donald Forbes for a murder committed after his release from imprisonment for a previous murder. He also led the evidence at the fatal accident inquiries into three disasters which occurred in 1971: the Ibrox disaster, the Clarkston explosion, and the death in a blizzard on Cairn Gorm of five school pupils and an instructor.

=== Court of Session ===
In November 1972, Brand was as appointed as a Senator of the College of Justice, replacing Lord Mackenzie Stuart who had been appointed to the European Court of Justice. He was installed in office on 9 November, with the judicial title Lord Brand. At a ceremony in the Court of Session attended by 16 judges, the oath of allegiance was administered by Lord Emslie.

In criminal cases, Brand admired the English judge Lord Devlin and the Scottish judge Lord Carmont. In 1992, he credited Carmont's imposition of severe sentences on members of the 1930s Glasgow razor gangs for ending the gangs' violence.

Brand himself earned a reputation for harsh sentencing. Tam Dalyell described him as "the latter-day Judge Jeffreys of the Scottish legal system", after George Jeffreys, the notorious 17th-century hanging judge. The appellate judge Lord Stott referred to "another of Brand's victims". However, after the passage of the Community Service by Offenders (Scotland) Act 1978 Brand was the first High Court judge in Scotland to impose a community service order instead of a prison sentence.

Promoted to the Inner House in 1984, Brand worked under the Lord President Lord Emslie. He admired Emslie so much that he later wrote that he had never dissented from any of Emslie's judgments, and never "had cause to do so".

Brand's judgments with Emslie included a March 1989 ruling in the Scottish Court of Criminal Appeal case of S. v. H.M. Advocate, a crucial test case on marital rape. Brand and Emslie, sitting with Lord Allanbridge upheld a High Court ruling by Lord Mayfield that a man should stand trial for the alleged rape of his wife. They acknowledged that Hale's 17th-century view that a "husband cannot be guilty of a rape committed by himself upon his lawful wife" persisted in England, but noted that David Hume's assertion of the principle in his 1797 work Commentaries on the Laws of Scotland respecting crimes appeared to have been borrowed from Hale. They doubted that it had ever formed parts of Scots Law, and ruled that if it had ever been a part, it no longer applied. The marital rape exemption in English law was abolished two years later, in the 1991 Law Lords judgment on R. v. R.

In October of that year, sitting with Lord Justice General Lord Hope and Lord Ross, he heard an appeal against Lord McCluskey's postponement of sentencing of a convicted rapist to hear the views of the victim. The judge overturned McCluskey's decision, ruling that it would be "invidious ... to expose the complainer to any risk of public pressure by passing any comment on matters that lie outside her expertise".

More prosaically, in the May 1992 case of Commissioners of Customs and Excise v United Biscuits (UK) Ltd Brand with Lord Murray and Lord Allanbridge zero-rated the Value-Added Tax (VAT) on biscuits supplied in a tin box. The judges ruled that the tin was not an incidental part of the sale; rather, it was integral to the biscuits as it was a container in which they were packaged.

== Retirement ==
Brand retired from the Court in 1989, aged 66, but worked intermittently as a temporary judge until shortly before his death. In 1994 he was appointed as a judge of the Court of Appeal in Botswana, due to his knowledge of the relevant languages. However, the intense heat led him to resign from the court after one session.

On 15 February 1996, The Times of London published a brief letter from Brand opposing Scottish devolution. His reason was that "One Ulster is enough".

His memoir An Advocate's Tale was published in 1996.

== Personal life ==
In 1948, Brand married Josephine Devlin. They had four daughters.

Josephine died in 1968. In 1969, Brand married again to Veronica (Vera) Lynch (née Russell), a widow who had been a bridesmaid at his first wedding.

== Death ==
Brand died in North Berwick on 14 April 1996, leaving his widow Vera, 4 daughters and five grandchildren. Vera died on 4 December 2013.

== Works ==
- Brand, David (1996). An Advocate's Tale: The Memoirs of Lord Brand. Scottish Cultural Press. ISBN 978-1898218081.

Legal offices
Preceded by Ewan Stewart	Solicitor General for Scotland; 1970–1972	Succeeded by William Stewart
