= Alan Turnbull, Lord Turnbull =

Scottish judge

The Right Honourable Lord Turnbull
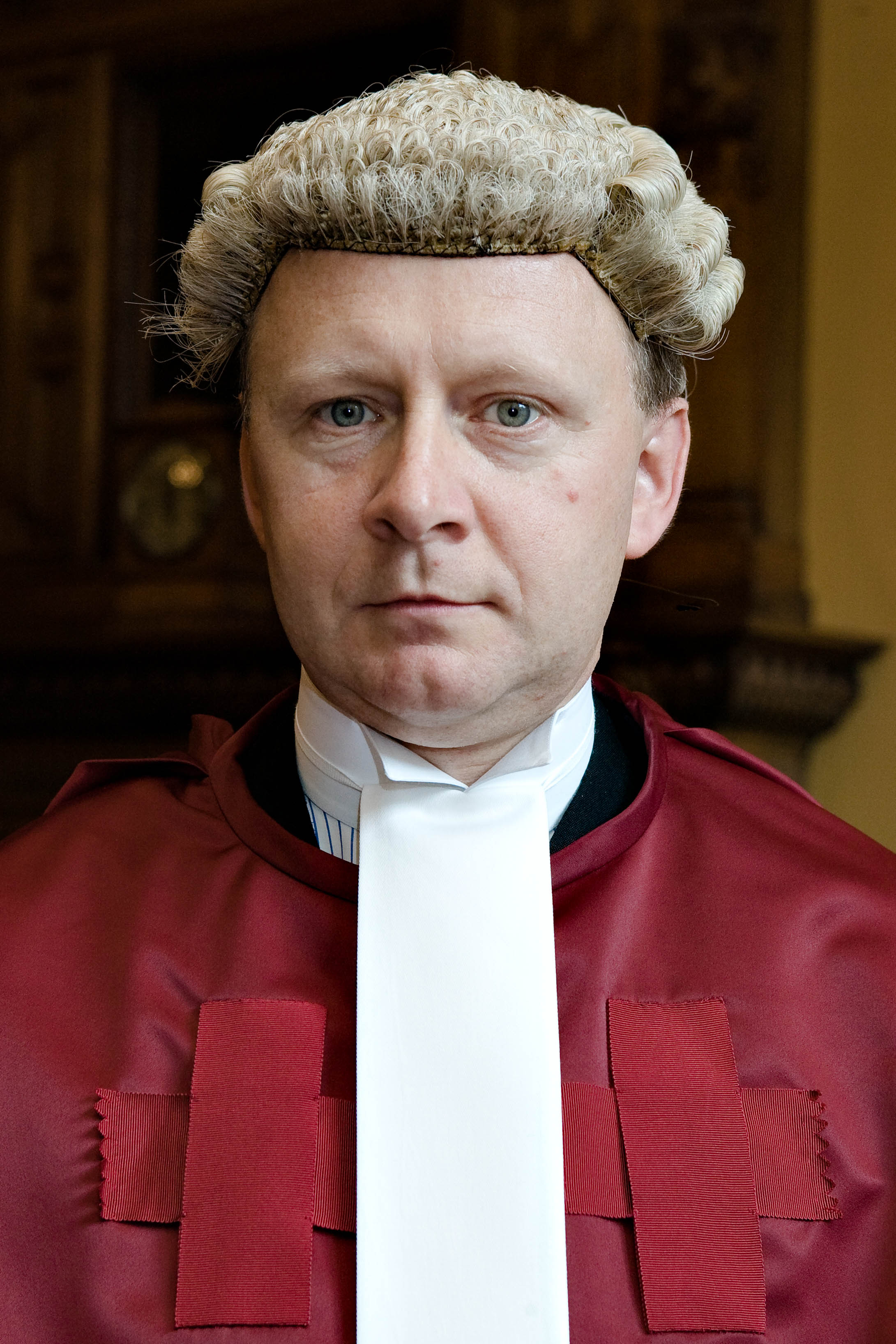
- Official portrait in 2006

Senator of the College of Justice
- Incumbent
- Assumed office 2006
- Nominated by: Jack McConnell; As First Minister
- Monarch: Elizabeth II
- Preceded by: Lord Marnoch

Personal details
- Born: Alan Turnbull
- Spouse: Dorothy Bain
- Education: University of Dundee (LLB)
- Profession: Advocate Judge

Alan Turnbull, Lord Turnbull PC is a Scottish lawyer, and a Senator of the College of Justice, a judge of the country's Supreme Courts. He was one of the lead prosecutors in the Pan Am Flight 103 bombing trial.

== Early life ==
Turnbull attended Dunfermline High School before studying at the School of Law of the University of Dundee, graduating in 1979, and was admitted to the Faculty of Advocates in 1982.

== Legal career ==
Turnbull worked initially in general practice at the Bar, but by 1988 had developed specialities in criminal defence and fraud. He was appointed an Advocate Depute in 1995, taking silk in 1996, and returning to private practice in 1997. In 1998, he was appointed one of two senior prosecuting counsel in the Lockerbie bombing trial, along with Alastair Campbell QC (now Lord Bracadale). In February 2001, he was appointed Principal Advocate Depute, resigning to return to private practice in 2006. He was succeeded as Principal Advocate Depute by John Beckett QC, who would later serve as Solicitor General, being appointed to the Bench later that year.

During his time working as Advocate Depute, Alan Turnbull prosecuted Scotland's most difficult criminal cases including that of William Beggs, known as the "Limbs in the Loch" murder. Other notable cases included Luke Mitchell, who was convicted of murdering his girlfriend, Jodi Jones, in Dalkeith; and businessman Nat Fraser, who was convicted of killing his wife, Arlene Fraser, in January 2003.

In 2006, Turnbull was appointed a Senator of the College of Justice, a judge of the Court of Session and High Court of Justiciary, the Supreme Courts of Scotland, with the judicial title, Lord Turnbull. He was at the time Scotland's youngest judge, at the age of forty-seven. He sat in the Outer House until his appointment to the Inner House in September 2016. One of his first cases on the Bench was Sheridan v News International, the Tommy Sheridan libel case against the publishers of the News of the World where he, perhaps controversially, effectively set aside the decision of the jury which was in favour of Sheridan. In 2008, his former university awarded him an honorary doctorate of laws. He also reduced the sentence of child killer John Leathem by four years.

On 17 June 2021, it was confirmed that Lord Turnbull would not hear criminal cases or cases involving the Scottish Government when his wife, Dorothy Bain QC, became Lord Advocate.

On 12 June 2023, the Secretary of State for Northern Ireland Chris Heaton-Harris, announced that Lord Turnbull will chair the Omagh Bombing Inquiry due to Turnbull's "previous experience of working on terrorism cases".

== See also ==
- List of Senators of the College of Justice
