= William Stewart, Lord Allanbridge =

Scottish lawyer, judge and politician

The Honourable Lord Allanbridge

Senator of the College of Justice
- In office 1977–1995
- Monarch: Elizabeth

Solicitor General for Scotland
- In office 1972–1974
- Monarch: Elizabeth
- Prime Minister: Heath
- Preceded by: David Brand later Lord Brand
- Succeeded by: The Lord McCluskey

Personal details
- Born: William Ian Stewart; 8 November 1925
- Died: 21 June 2012 (aged 86)
- Party: Conservative
- Education: University of Glasgow, University of Edinburgh
- Profession: Lawyer

Military service
- Branch/service: Royal Navy
- Years of service: 1944 - 1946
- Rank: Sub-Lieutenant
- Unit: Royal Naval Volunteer Reserve

William Ian Stewart, Lord Allanbridge (8 November 1925 – 21 June 2012) was a Scottish lawyer, judge and politician, who served as Solicitor General for Scotland, the country's junior Law Officer from 1972 to 1974, and as a Senator of the College of Justice, a judge of the Supreme Courts of Scotland, from 1977 to 1995.

== Early life ==
Stewart was born in 1925, the son of architect John Stewart and his wife, Maysie Shepherd Service. He was educated at Loretto School and studied at the Universities of Glasgow and Edinburgh, and served in the Royal Naval Volunteer Reserve at the end of the Second World War from 1944 to 1946. He was admitted to the Faculty of Advocates in 1951 and appointed Queen's Counsel (QC) in 1965.

== Career ==
Stewart followed a traditional career at the Bar, serving as an Advocate Depute from 1959 to 1964 and Home Advocate Depute from 1970 to 1972. He also served two non-consecutive years on the Criminal Injuries Compensation Board, from 1969 to 1970 and 1976 to 1977.

=== Solicitor General ===
In 1972, he became Solicitor General for Scotland in the Conservative government of Ted Heath. The Solicitor General was the junior of the two Law Officers then existing in respect of Scotland, the senior being the Lord Advocate, an office held at the time by Norman Wylie, MP for Edinburgh Pentlands. Stewart lost his position at the 1974 election, which was won by the Labour Party. From April to December that year, he served as temporary Sheriff Principal of Dumfries and Galloway, the post vacated by his successor as Solicitor General, John McCluskey (later Lord McCluskey).

=== The Bench ===
Stewart was appointed to the Benches of the Court of Session and High Court of Justiciary, Scotland's Supreme Courts in 1977 as a Senator of the College of Justice with judicial title Lord Allanbridge. He remained on the Bench until retirement in 1995.

== Personal life ==
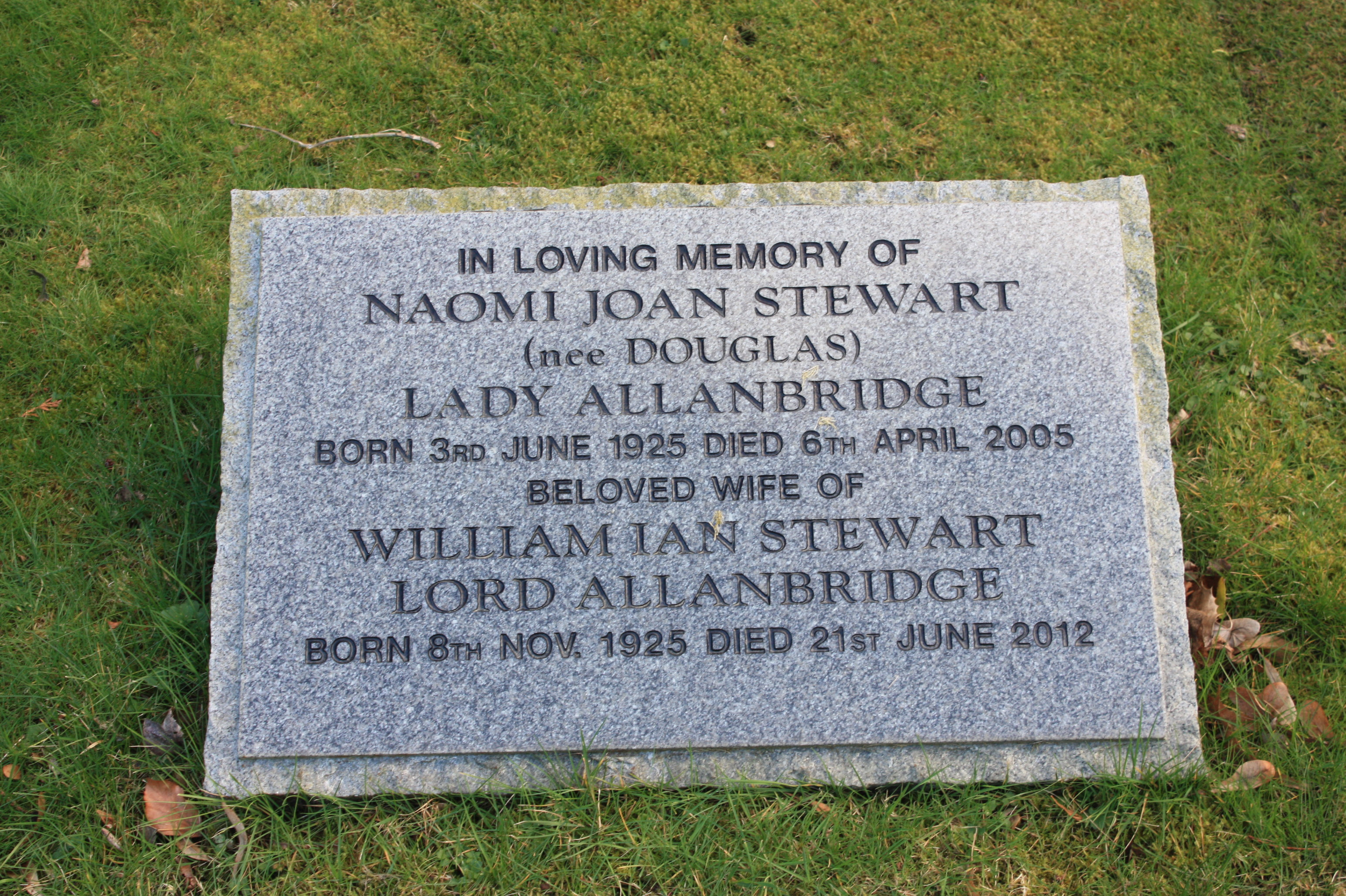
The grave of William Stewart, Lord Allanbridge, Dean Cemetery, Edinburgh

Stewart married Naomi Joan Douglas in 1955 and had a son and a daughter. He was widowed in 2005. He lived in Edinburgh and was a member of the New Club.

He is buried with his wife in Dean Cemetery in western Edinburgh. The simple grave lies in the group of modern stones where the original cemetery links to its north Victorian extension.

Legal offices
Preceded by David Brand	Solicitor General for Scotland; 1972–1974	Succeeded by John McCluskey
