= Lord Turnbull =

Lord Turnbull may refer to:

- Andrew Turnbull, Baron Turnbull, English civil servant
- Alan Turnbull, Lord Turnbull, Scottish judge
