= Lord Brand =

Lord Brand may refer to:

- Robert Brand, 1st Baron Brand (1878–1963), British civil servant and businessman
- David Brand, Lord Brand (1923–1996), Scottish lawyer and judge, Senator of the College of Justice 1972–89
