= John Spens, Lord Condie =

Scottish lawyer and judge

John Spens, Lord Condie (1520?–1573) was a Scottish lawyer and judge who became Lord Advocate.

== Life ==
The son of James Spens of Condie and Joanna Arnot, he was born about 1520, and educated at St Salvator's College, St Andrews, where he became a determinant in 1543. In 1549 he was, with eight other advocates, chosen by the Court of Session to plead before them in all cases. On 21 October 1555 he was appointed joint Queen's Advocate to Mary Queen of Scots with David Lauder, after whose death in 1560 he was made a judge; but he continued to hold the post of queen's advocate, which he shared with Robert Crichton from 8 February 1560. His pension as the queen's advocate was £400 Scots yearly.

When John Knox, on account of his letter about the mass, was in 1563 accused of treason, Spens came to him privately, and expressed the opinion that Knox had not been guilty of anything punishable by law. Knox stated that when Spens was commanded to accuse him before the queen, he did so, but "very gently". He adhered to the queen's party after her marriage to Henry Darnley; and he was officially entrusted with the prosecution of the murderers of David Rizzio. He also attended officially at the indictment of James Hepburn, 4th Earl of Bothwell for the murder of Darnley.

In 1566 Spens was appointed one of a commission for the revision of the laws. He remained in office after the imprisonment of the queen. Mary escaped from Lochleven Castle in May 1568. At Hamilton she gave her oath that she had made her abdication under duress. John Spens of Condie drafted a strongly-worded revocation of her demission, denouncing the Earl of Morton, the Earl of Moray, the Earl of Mar, and many others.

He died in 1573.

== Notes ==
Attribution

This article incorporates text from a publication now in the public domain: Lee, Sidney, ed. (1898). "Spens, John". Dictionary of National Biography. Vol. 53. London: Smith, Elder & Co.
