= Walter G. Leechman =

Scottish solicitor and political activist

Walter Graham Leechman (1870–1943) was a Scottish solicitor and political activist who represented Mrs Donoghue in the landmark legal case Donoghue v Stevenson.

== Early life ==
Born in 1870 in what is now Bishopbriggs Leechman was known as much for his socialist politics as his legal abilities. Leechman stood as a parliamentary candidate (always unsuccessfully) for the Independent Labour Party, then the Labour Party in Mid Lanark, Maryhill, Kelvin and Springburn constituencies.

== Activism ==
While Mrs Donoghue may have been Leechman’s most famous client his political sympathies meant he attracted a range of more controversial clients including Red Clydesiders like James Maxton, Manny Shinwell and David Kirkwood. In 1919 he represented the George Square rioters and in 1921 following an armed attack by Sinn Féin in Glasgow, in which one policeman was killed and another seriously injured, Leechman represented some of the defendants. He also visited Communist John MacLean in prison and represented him.

On a visit to the House of Commons in 1913, Leechman, his wife Barbara and his friend, another Dunbartonshire figure, former MP Robert Cunninghame Graham, refused to sign an undertaking that they would keep quiet and not interject in proceedings. Leechman objected to having to provide such an undertaking and his high-volume protest was heard in the chamber and caused some amusement among MPs. Police officers eventually escorted Leechman from the public gallery.

== Later life ==
Leechman moved with his family to Old Kilpatrick around 1910 where he stood for the local council and continued his political activism. His sons travelled to Glasgow for their education. James, like his father became a solicitor and, also like his father supported the Labour Party. In 1964 he was appointed Solicitor General for Scotland in Harold Wilson’s government.

Leechman died on a visit to his daughter who lived in Comrie in 1943.
