= Henry Lauder, Lord St Germains =

Scottish lawyer and landowner

Henry Lauder, Lord St Germains (d. 19 July 1561 Edinburgh) was a Scottish lawyer and landowner.

He was a son of Gilbert Lauder (d. before 19 May 1550), a son of Lauder of Haltoun. Gilbert Lauder was a Baillie and burgess of Edinburgh, by right of his first wife Elizabeth Hoppar (d. before September 1525), a kinswoman of the influential Isobel Hoppar. Henry Lauder was made a burgess of Edinburgh on 14 March 1517 by right as son of his father.

On 16 August 1516 he was mentioned as "Magister et Dominus Henricus Lauder". Henry Lauder was described as Sheriff of Perth, by commission, in a sasine dated at Edinburgh 11 August 1518. In August 1524 he is described as one of the Sheriffs of Linlithgow, Berwickshire, Roxburghshire and Selkirkshire in April 1525, and of Selkirk again in May 1527.

He was one of the nine advocates nominated and appointed at the institution of the College of Justice as an Ordinary Lord, styled Lord St Germains, 13 January 1538. On the occasion of the Entry of Mary of Guise, the bride of James V, into Edinburgh in 1538, it was "devysit that Maister Henry Lawder be the persoun to welcum the Quenis grace in sic abulyement, and with the words in Fransche, as sall be devysit with avyse of Maister Adame Otterburne, Maister James Fowlis and David Lyndsay". He became Deputy Advocate, Joint Lord Advocate (with Sir Adam Otterburn) in 1533, and Lord Advocate on 10 September 1538 to King James V.

When his son, Gilbert Lauder, was made a burgess of Edinburgh in 1562, the entry described Henry as "advocate to our sovereign Lady", advocate to Mary, Queen of Scots.

In a letter sent to the Court of Session by James V, he is styled "our lovit [loved] familiar clerk, Mr. Henry Lauder, our advocate". He was appointed to the Bench before 2 March 1540, and was King's Advocate in parliament 1538, 1540, 1541; and in 1542 he voted for the appointment of the Earl of Arran as Governor of Scotland. He was Commissioner for holding parliament between 1544 and 1548.

He acquired a house in the fashionable Cowgate of Edinburgh, and also in East Lothian at St Germains.

In a Retour for Kirkcudbrightshire, (number 25), dated 25 October 1556, Henry Lauder, Queen's Advocate, was served heir of Gilbert Lauder, burgess of Edinburgh, his father, in 10 mercats of land of ancient extent called Netherthrid in the parish of Kirkormo. Also in the lands of Lagane extending to 5 mercats lands of ancient extent in the parish and barony of Cardeneis.

On 27 January 1558 he was given a "gift of the relief of all and the whole of the ten merk lands of old extent called the Nether Thrid, with the pertinents, lying in the parish of Kirkcormok within the Stewartry of Kirkudbrightshire, which our sovereign lady had siesed or given to the said Master Henry as heir to Gilbert Lauder, burgess of Edinburgh, his father, of the same".

In the National Archives (GD91/6) is a Precept of sasine by sir William Makdougall, chaplain of the Altar of St. Nicholas in St Giles in Edinburgh, in favour of Henry Lauder, as heir to deceased Gilbert Lauder, burgess of Edinburgh, his father, in lands of Pyttravy, following on precept furth of Chancery, dated 1 August 1560 and recorded 16 November 1560.
