= Ian Shearer, Lord Avonside =

Scottish lawyer and judge

The Right Honourable Lord Avonside
- Lord Avonside in 1964

Senator of the College of Justice in Scotland
- In office 1964–1984

Lord Advocate
- In office 1962–1964

Personal details
- Born: Ian Hamilton Shearer

Ian Hamilton Shearer, Lord Avonside, PC (6 November 1914 – 22 February 1996) was a Scottish lawyer and judge.

== Biography ==
Educated at Dunfermline High School, the University of Glasgow and the University of Edinburgh, he was admitted to the Faculty of Advocates in 1938. He served in the Royal Artillery in World War II. He was standing counsel to Customs and Excise, the Board of Trade and the Ministry of Labour 1947–49, and to the Inland Revenue 1949–51. He was appointed a Queen's Counsel in 1952.

He was Sheriff of Renfrew and Argyll 1960–62, and Lord Advocate from October 1962 to 1964. He was appointed a privy counsellor in 1962. On leaving office, he was appointed a Senator of the College of Justice in 1964, Taking the judicial title Lord Avonside, he filled the vacancy caused by the resignation of Lord Mackintosh, and held the office until 1984.

He was a Lecturer in Social Sciences at the University of Edinburgh's Department of Educational Studies from 1962 until 1970.

He was also a Member of the Lands Valuation Court from 1964 (Chairman from 1975 to 1984), Chairman of the National Health Service Tribunal, Scotland 1954–62, a Member of the Scottish Committee of the Council on Tribunals 1958–62, Chairman of the Scottish Valuation Advisory Council 1965–68, and a Member of the Scottish Universities Committee of the Privy Council from 1971. He was President of the Stair Society 1975–87.

Legal offices
Preceded by William Grant	Lord Advocate; 1962–1964	Succeeded by Gordon Stott
