= David Borthwick, Lord Lochill =

Scottish landowner, Senator of the College of Justice and Lord Advocate

David Borthwick, Lord Lochill (c. 1505 – 1581) was a 16th-century Scottish landowner, Senator of the College of Justice and Lord Advocate.

== Life ==
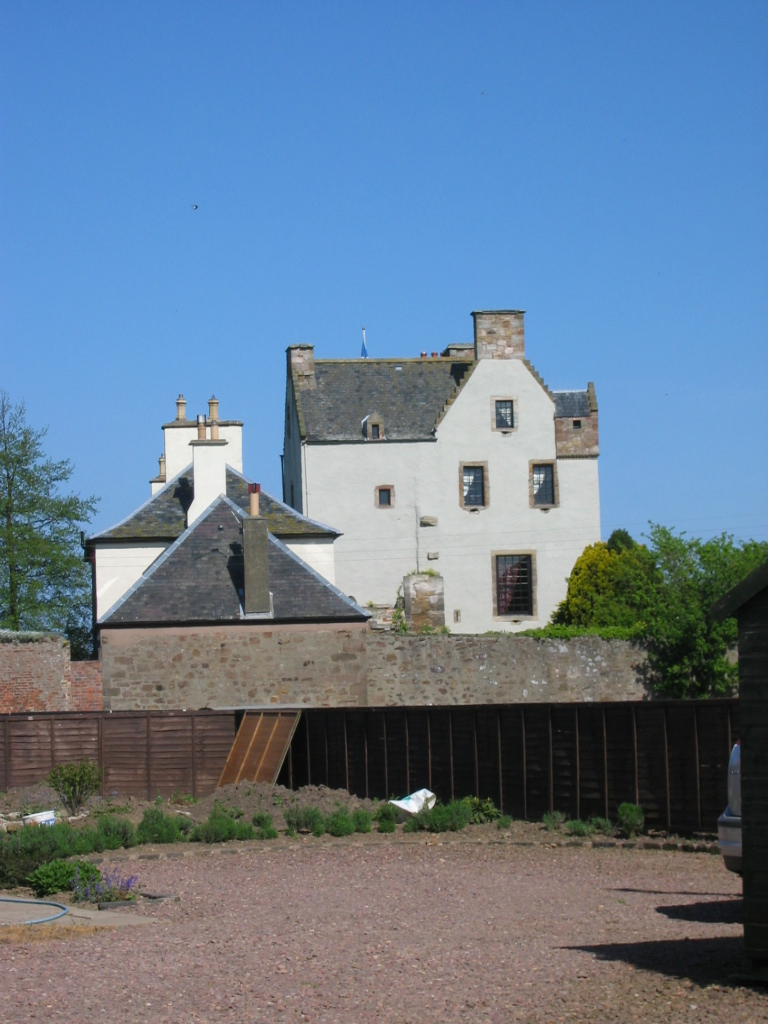
Lochill Castle (Ballencrieff)

He was born in Fife around 1505 and studied Canon Law and Civil Law at St Leonards College in St Andrews.

In early life he is known as David Borthwick of Auldistone or Admistone. At some time in the mid 16th century, either through inheritance or purchase, he became laird of Balcarres House in Fife and the nearby Balniel estate.

In March 1540 he was one of nine advocates called before the Court of Session in Edinburgh to explain their actions and causes. In 1552 he was one of the Scottish commissioners meeting with the English to discuss the boundary between England and Scotland including a long debate on Berwick-upon-Tweed.

In May 1562 he oversaw the trial of Wright and Ferguson for the "hamesucken" murder (murder in the victim's house) of his distant cousin, John Borthwick of Restalrig.

Sometime around 1561/62 he obtained Ballencrieff Castle in East Lothian, and renamed it Lochill Castle. The building is more correctly a fortified house rather than a true castle. It still survives, not far from Haddington.

In June 1564 he defended the city magistrates in a prosecution against them by the Crown (possibly relating to election of the Lord Provost).

In May 1569 he defended the Earl of Bothwell in relation to his actions against Mary Queen of Scots at Dunbar. This extremely curious case was effectively an accusation of rape of the Queen in April 1567 but was a precursor to her marriage to Bothwell in May 1567, the whole case being effectively to defend the Queen's honour.

Borthwick's clients included Katherine Campbell, Countess of Crawford, who noted on a copy of son's 1571 marriage contract "remember to send Mr Borthwick to aviss [advise] with all contracts and writings".

In 1573, alongside Robert Crichton, together as joint King's Advocate to King James VI, and most records also accept that they first to be titled as Lord Advocate. He was at the same time elected as a Senator of the College of Justice under the title of "Lord Lochill".

He died in January 1581.

In 1608 the Ballencrieff estate was bought by Sir Bernard Lindsay and then to Sir Patrick Murray in 1632, In 1679 it passed to Sir Peter Wedderburn and in 1755 was bought by George Murray, Lord Elibank, great-grandson of Sir Patrick Murray.

== Family ==
His daughter Isobella Borthwick, married his colleague Robert Crichton (Lord Advocate). Isobella died around five years later (possibly in childbirth).
