= Dorothy Bain =

Scottish advocate

The Right Honourable Dorothy Bain KC
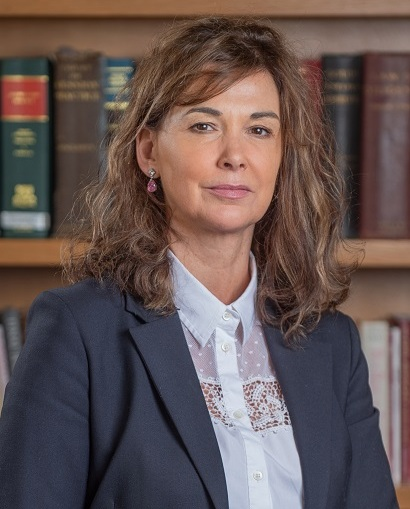
- Official portrait, 2021

Lord Advocate
- In office 22 June 2021 – 19 June 2026
- Monarchs: Elizabeth II; Charles III
- First Minister: Nicola Sturgeon; Humza Yousaf; John Swinney
- Solicitor General: Ruth Charteris
- Preceded by: James Wolffe
- Succeeded by: Ruth Charteris

Principal Advocate Depute
- In office June 2009 – July 2011

Personal details
- Born: Dorothy Ruth Bain
- Party: Independent
- Spouse: Lord Turnbull
- Education: University of Aberdeen
- Occupation: Advocate
- Profession: Lawyer

Dorothy Ruth Bain KC is a Scottish advocate who served as Lord Advocate between 2021 and 2026. She was the second woman to hold the office after Lady Elish Angiolini KC. Ruth Charteris KC, who served under Bain as Solicitor General from 2021, took over as Lord Advocate in 2026 on her resignation. Bain previously served as the Principal Advocate Depute from 2009 to 2011, the first woman to hold the prosecutorial position in Scotland.

Born in Edinburgh, Bain attended the University of Aberdeen School of Law, graduating with an LLB and a Diploma in Legal Practice. In 1994, she became an advocate and in 2007 she was appointed Queen's Counsel, now King's Counsel. Bain served as an Advocate Depute in the Crown Office from 2002 to 2011 and was appointed the first female Principal Advocate Depute from 2009 to 2011. In 2008, she was commissioned to report on the prosecution of sex crimes in Scotland, the outcome of which led to the formation of Scotland's National Sex Crimes Unit in 2009. She returned to private practice in 2011.

First Minister Nicola Sturgeon nominated Bain for Lord Advocate and on 22 June 2021 she was sworn into office at the Court of Session with Ruth Charteris KC, Solicitor General. It was the first time both positions have been held by women at the same time. In October 2022, she argued the Scottish Government's unsuccessful case in the UK Supreme Court on the legality of a second referendum on Scottish independence.

It was announced on 30 June 2026 that Bain had been appointed as a Senator of the College of Justice and would take up appointment on 7 January 2027.

== Early life ==
One of five children, Bain's mother was a shorthand typist and her father was a postman. She attended the University of Aberdeen, where her older sister, Helen, was studying medicine and then her younger sister, Elizabeth, studied psychology. They were the first generation in her family to attend university. She earned an LLB degree and a Diploma in Legal Practice.

== Legal career ==
=== Early career ===
Completing her traineeship with TF Reid & Donaldson, a law firm in Paisley, Bain was still unsure of where she wanted to take her legal career. After working for Dundas & Wilson, she began her career as an advocate in 1994. She worked in civil practice from 1994 until 2002.

=== Advocate Depute (2002–2009) ===
From 2002 to 2011 she served as an Advocate Depute working within the Crown Office and Procurator Fiscal Service. In 2008, she was commissioned by the Lord Advocate, Elish Angiolini, and the Solicitor General, Frank Muholland, to report on and make recommendations on the prosecution of sex crimes in Scotland, the outcome of which led to the formation of Scotland's National Sexual Crimes Unit.

=== Principal Advocate Depute (2009–2011) ===
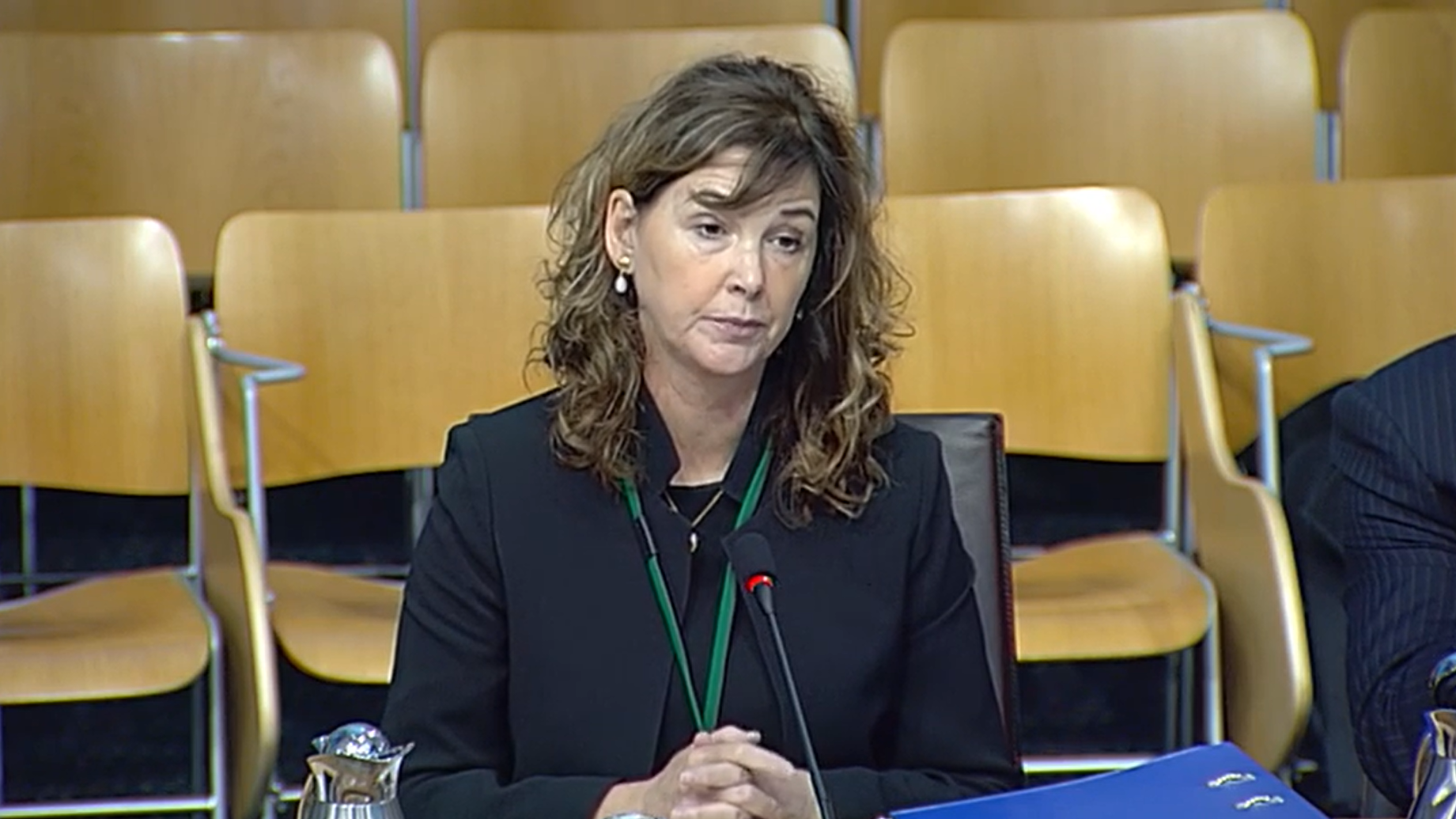
Bain before the Scottish Parliament's Justice Committee, 2018

In June 2009, Bain became the first and highest-ranking female to hold the prosecutorial position in Scotland, as Principal Advocate Depute. She became known for her prosecution of high-profile cases such as the serial killer Peter Tobin, the Operation Algebra case which resulted in the conviction of (then) the largest paedophile ring in the UK, as well the prosecution of four members of a drug gang for murder, and a wide-ranging 2009 child pornography case.

Bain has been instructed in cases at all levels, including the Court of Session, Court of Criminal Appeal, High Court of Justiciary, Supreme Court of the United Kingdom, and the European Court of Human Rights.

In 2011, following the promotion of Frank Mulholland QC as Lord Advocate, Bain was seen as a likely contender to succeed Mulholland as Solicitor General. However, she was not nominated by Alex Salmond and the office was given to Lesley Thomson.

=== Private Practice (2011–2021) ===
Bain returned to private practice in 2011. She represented the family of a victim of the 2014 Glasgow bin lorry crash. She also represented the petitioner in a petition to the Nobile Officium of the High Court of Justiciary which held that where an accused person in criminal proceedings seeks to admit evidence of sexual history, the complainer must be told of the content of the application; invited to comment on the accuracy of any allegations within it; and be asked to state any objections which they might have to the granting of the application. She was Counsel to the Investigatory Powers Tribunal in Scotland and Chair of the Police Appeals Tribunal.

== Lord Advocate (2021–2026) ==
=== Appointment ===
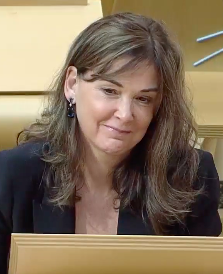
Bain in the Scottish Parliament receiving the First Minister's nomination for the position of Lord Advocate, June 2021

On 16 June 2021, it was announced that Bain would be nominated by Nicola Sturgeon, subject to the approval of the Scottish Parliament, to take up office as Lord Advocate, succeeding James Wolffe. Her appointment as Lord Advocate was approved by the Scottish Parliament the following day. She was sworn into office at the Court of Session, alongside Ruth Charteris KC as Solicitor General, on 22 June. On 10 November, she was appointed to the Privy Council earning the title 'The Right Honourable'.

The appointment of both Bain and Charteris marks the first time that the positions of Lord Advocate and Solicitor General have been occupied by two women at the same time. Bain entered the role of Lord Advocate during a time of immense pressure and public scrutiny of the role, following the involvement of her predecessor, James Wolffe, in the legal case regarding former First Minister Alex Salmond. There had been calls for the post of Lord Advocate to be split, with discussions about the Solicitor General for Scotland becoming the chief legal adviser to the Scottish Government instead of the Lord Advocate.

During her speech to the Scottish Parliament chamber in June 2021, First Minister Nicola Sturgeon said that she was "extremely pleased" to be recommending the agreement of the Scottish Parliament to formally request Bain be nominated as Lord Advocate. Sturgeon said that she had selected Bain due to her "extensive experience in both civil and criminal law, appearing in cases at all levels, including the Court of Session, the Court of Criminal Appeal, the High Court of Justiciary, the United Kingdom Supreme Court and the European Court of Human Rights".

=== Tenure ===
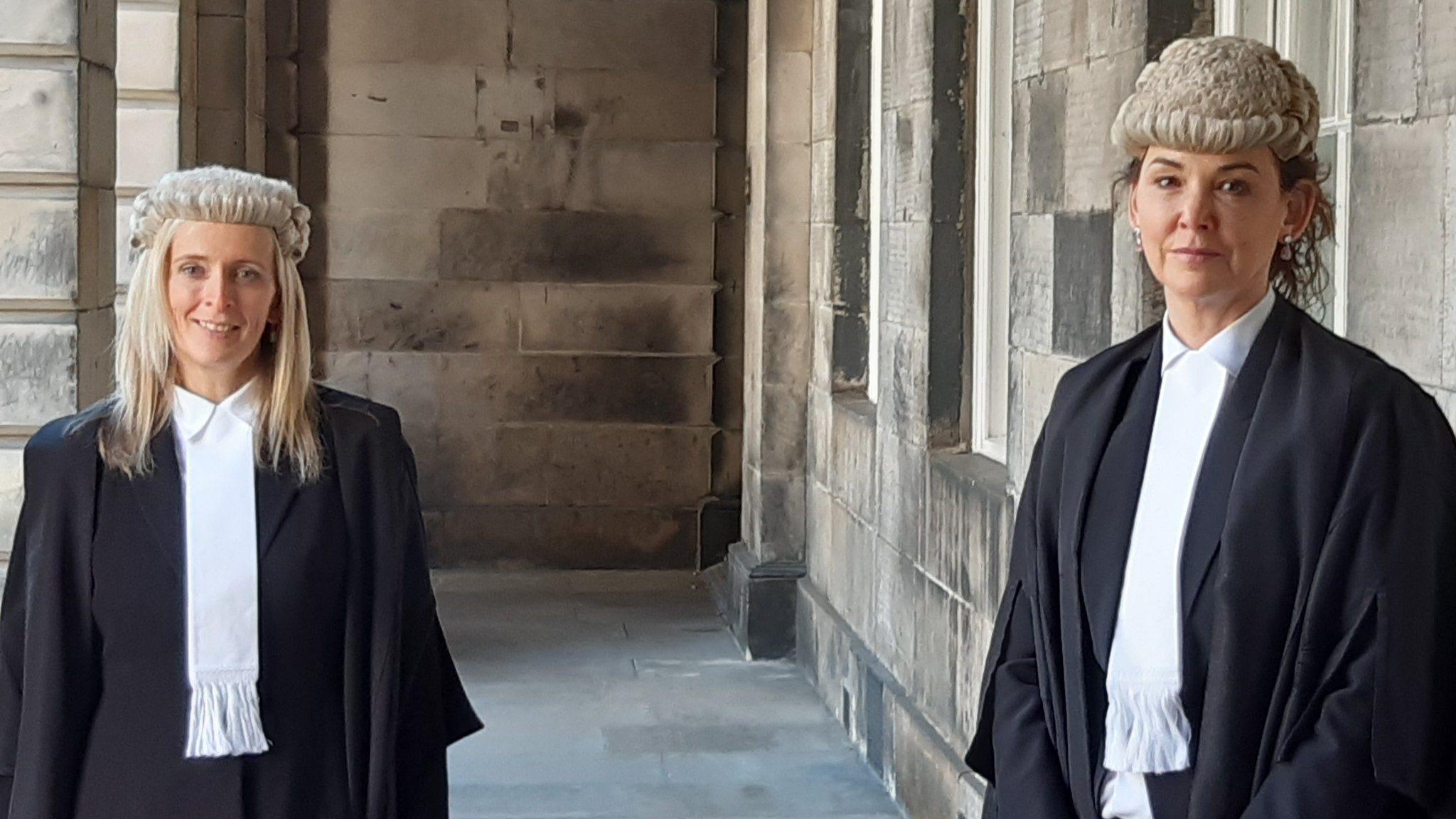
Bain alongside Ruth Charteris KC, following their appointment as Scotland's law officers at the Court of Session, June 2021

Bain has promised to act independently and has stated she will assist the First Minister over a review of the functions of Lord Advocate. The Scottish Government had previously committed to a review of the position of Lord Advocate, specifically the dual role the Lord Advocate has in relation to being both the head of the prosecution service and a member of the government's cabinet. A consultation of Scottish lawyers in 2021 found an overwhelming majority of those asked were in favour of the Lord Advocate's role to be split. Both the government of Nicola Sturgeon and Sturgeon's successor, the Yousaf government, have committed to a review of the Lord Advocate's role by the end of the current Scottish Parliamentary term in 2026.

As the chief legal adviser to the Scottish Government, Bain began her tenure as Lord Advocate expected to defend the Scottish Parliament over the Scottish Government's second Scottish independence referendum proposal. Scottish Conservative MSP Jamie Greene said that the Lord Advocate "had to lead" the debate in the Supreme Court on behalf of the Scottish Government despite "having grave reservations about its legal merit". Addressing the Supreme Court, Bain advocated that she believes that it "would be in the public's interest that clarity be brought about the scope of the Scottish Parliament's powers in respect to this issue" (the holding of a legally binding second independence referendum). The case was ultimately unsuccessful for the Lord Advocate and the Scottish Government, with the Supreme Court ruling in favour that the Scottish Parliament does not have the legal ability to constitute for a second independence referendum "without the UK Government's permission".

==== Drug policy ====
In September 2021, Bain made a statement to Parliament over a "radical" reform of the drug policy in Scotland, branded "de facto decriminalisation", in an effort to tackle the country's drug crisis. In July 2021, the National Record of Scotland reported a 5% increase in drug-related deaths in 2020. The new policy announced would mean people caught with Class A drugs will be offered a police warning instead of being referred to prosecutors. This will extend the existing law for the possession of Class B and Class C drugs. Bain told MSPs: "I have considered the review and I have decided that an extension of the recorded police warning guidelines to include possession offences for Class A drugs is appropriate. Police officers may therefore choose to issue a recorded police warning for simple possession offences for all classes of drugs." Many opposition parties argued against the law change, highlighting cities across Scotland, including Dundee, where "communities are devastated by the failures of the 'war on drugs' approach". Others criticised the policy change should have been debated by the Parliament. The Scottish Conservatives' justice spokesman, Jamie Greene, insisted "nothing that has been said today will stop drug deaths" and the only way to tackle Scotland's drug deaths crisis is to "improve access to treatment and rehabilitation, not to dilute how seriously we treat possession of deadly drugs like heroin, crystal meth and crack cocaine."

In November 2021, Bain told the Scottish Parliament's justice committee, she would consider a "precise and specific" proposal for drugs consumption rooms in Scotland. Her predecessor, James Wolffe, ruled out the idea of consumption rooms where drug users could take illegal substances in supervised conditions. Bain told the committee: "The potential offences which may be committed in any particular consumption facility will depend on the individual scheme envisaged, the policies and processes within the individual scheme, and the actual behaviours of both the operators and the users. And so the Lord Advocate couldn't actually, as a matter of law, whether through policy, or otherwise, decriminalise conduct which was by law criminal. Nor could immunity from prosecution be granted in advance."

==== Proposed referendum on Scottish independence ====
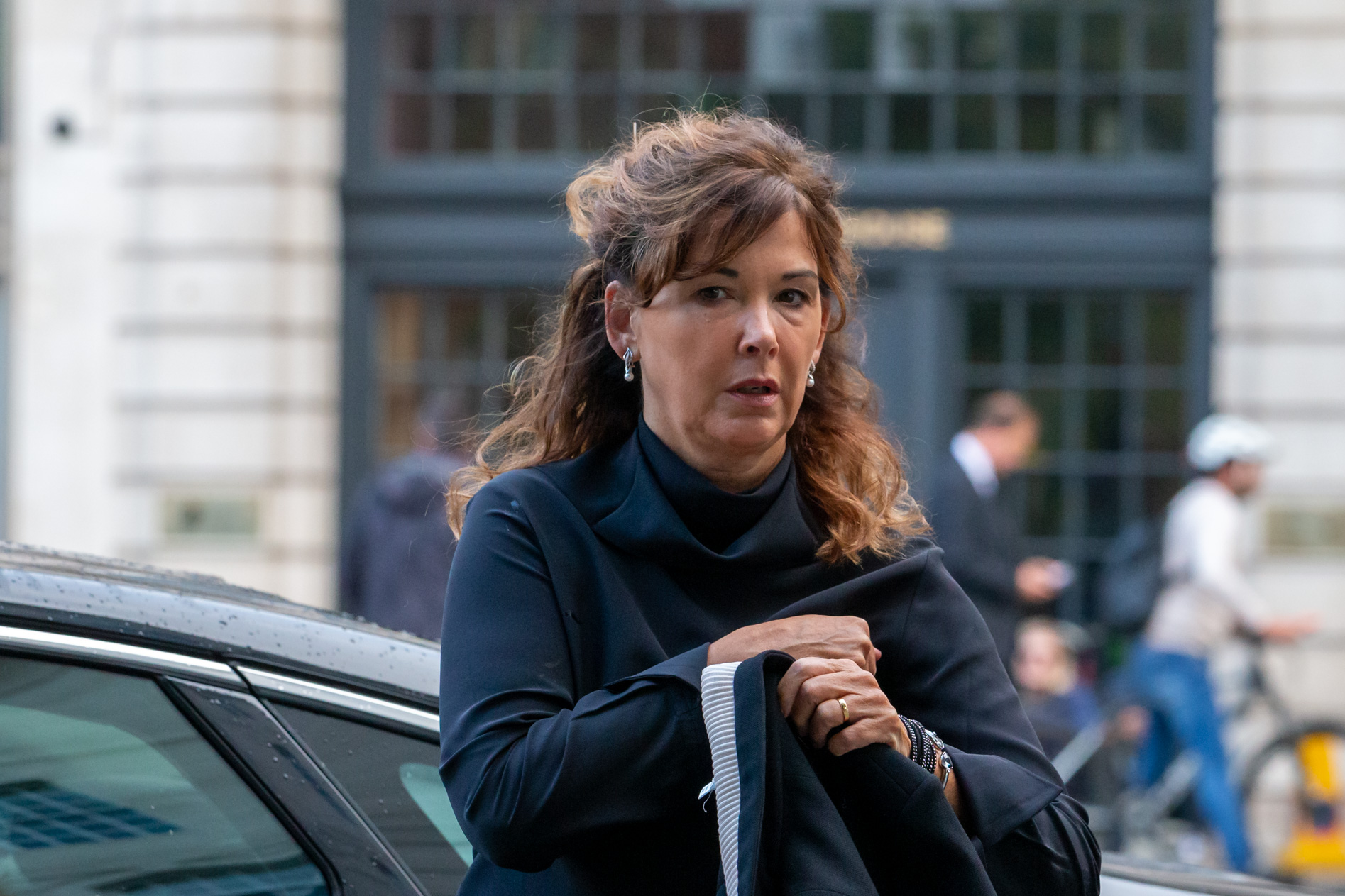
Bain attends the accession council of King Charles III following the death of Queen Elizabeth II, September 2022

In June 2022, the First Minister launched her government's campaign to hold a second referendum on Scottish independence. In the negotiations for the 2014 Scottish independence referendum, the UK Government granted the powers for the Scottish Government to hold a referendum. However, the current UK administration has blocked Nicola Sturgeon's proposal for another referendum. The following month, Sturgeon announced the referendum would be held on 19 October 2023 and sought the Prime Minister's consent to the vote by the granting of a section 30 order, a move that Downing Street rejected. In response, Sturgeon asked Bain to consider referring the matter to the Supreme Court of the United Kingdom to rule if the Scottish Government has the power to host a referendum without the Government of the United Kingdom's approval, which request Bain granted.

Bain advised the Government that holding a referendum, without a Section 30 order from Westminster, would "likely be unlawful". She wrote to the Supreme Court to rule whether Holyrood has the legal powers to hold a referendum without the UK Government's approval. Michael Keating, a political scientist, suggested Bain had doubts about the legality of the referendum and in order to keep her political neutrality, she sought to ask the court for a ruling.

On 22 July 2022, Bain published the legal argument for a second referendum. She went before judges at the Supreme Court in October 2022, where she argued the case for a referendum. Bain emphasised holding a referendum itself was "advisory" and would have no legal impact on the future of the union and argued it would be inappropriate for the court to "speculate" on what actions the Government would take after a referendum.

==== COVID-19 deaths in Scotland ====
From 21 May 2020, Bain, as Lord Advocate, directed that any death in Scotland, either confirmed or expected, from the COVID-19 pandemic be reported to the Crown and Procurator Fiscal Service. Following this direction by the Lord Advocate, the Crown and Procurator Fiscal Service established a COVID Deaths Investigation Team who works closely in conjunction with Police Scotland and other agencies throughout Scotland to obtain information regarding deaths in Scotland from May 2020 in order for these deaths to be fully investigated by both the Lord Advocate and the Crown and Procurator Fiscal Service.

Bain established Operation Koper in her role as Lord Advocate, serving as the head of the systems of prosecution and investigation of deaths in Scotland. Since Operation Koper began, it resulted in thousands of deaths in Scotland being investigated by the Crown Office under the Lord Advocate, but families were said to be "left in limbo" as there had been no commitment to the holding of a fatal accident inquiry (FAI) regarding these deaths. Only the Lord Advocate can formally launch a fatal accident inquiry, and such an inquiry is at the discretion of the Lord Advocate.

As Lord Advocate, Bain changed the system for the way deaths relating to Covid-19 were required to be reported in Scottish care homes under Operation Koper. The change in the system by Bain as Lord Advocate was praised by agencies such as Scottish Care, Scotland's independent care service operator.

==== Horizon scandal ====
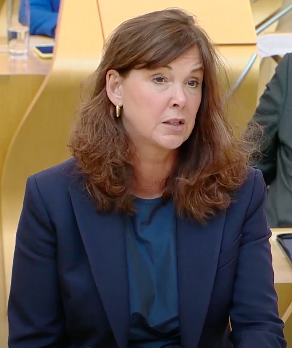
Bain addresses the Scottish Parliament regarding the Horizon Scandal, 16 May 2024

In January 2024, it was revealed that Bain could be brought forward by the Scottish Parliament for questioning relating to the wrongful prosecution of up to 100 Post Office branch managers in Scotland as part of the horizon scandal. Although the Crown Office was advised of issues in 2013, they did not stop pursuing cases relating to the scandal until two years later. The BBC published that Bain, as Lord Advocate, could be questioned about why concerns were not made sooner by the Crown Office. First Minister Humza Yousaf told the Scottish Parliament on 11 January 2024 that after speaking with Bain, she was "more than happy to consider whether it was a briefing or whether it was a ministerial statement". He also stated that ultimately Bain will have the power to decide any future steps regarding the scandal and how any questions relating to it will be handled. Yousaf had earlier confirmed that all individuals wrongly accused in Scotland would have their convictions overturned.

In May 2024, Bain, as Lord Advocate, stripped the Post Office of its status as a reporting agency. Instead, the Post Office would have to report all allegations of crime within the organisation to Police Scotland. In a statement, Bain said "because of its fundamental and sustained failures in connection with Horizon cases in Scotland, I've decided that Post Office Limited is not fit to be a specialist reporting agency". She further confirmed that the Post Office in Scotland "is therefore no longer able to investigate and report criminal allegations directly to the Crown and it should now instead report any allegations of criminality to Police Scotland for them to investigate".

==== Calls for reformation of role ====
Since Bain assumed the role of Lord Advocate in 2021, there have been calls for the position to be reformed. In January 2024, SNP MP Joanna Cherry KC introduced a private members bill in the House of Commons that would allow for powers to be given to the Scottish Parliament to reform the Lord Advocate's role. The proposals for reform include the dividing of the Lord Advocate's role as the chief legal adviser to the Scottish Government, as well as serving as the head of the Scottish prosecution service. If successful in its reform, the chief legal adviser and head of the prosecution service would become two separate positions, with only the chief legal adviser being a member of the Scottish Government.

Cherry argued in her statement that the proposals would eliminate any cause for concern regarding "conflict of interest", naming high profile cases such as the "Alex Salmond harassment case, the Rangers F.C. malicious prosecution scandal and the ongoing investigation into SNP finances" as examples as to why such accusations could be made given the Lord Advocate's current role within the Scottish Government as its chief legal adviser.

=== Resignation ===
On 15 May 2026, Bain informed the First Minister, John Swinney, that she intended to stand down as Lord Advocate, with the Scottish Government confirming that a new Lord Advocate would be appointed during the process of forming a new Scottish Government following the electoral victory of the SNP during the 2026 Scottish Parliament election. On 19 June 2026, a new Lord Advocate was sworn in, thereby effecting her resignation.

== Personal life ==
Bain is married to Alan Turnbull, Lord Turnbull, a Scottish judge in the Court of Session's Inner House.

Legal offices
Preceded by James Wolffe	Lord Advocate; 2021–present	Incumbent
