= James Leechman, Lord Leechman =

Scottish advocate and judge

James Graham Leechman, Lord Leechman (6 October 1906 - May 1986) was a Scottish advocate and judge.

== Career ==
Leechman was the son of the Walter Graham Leechman, a solicitor in Glasgow. He grew up in Old Kilpatrick and was educated at Glasgow High School and at Glasgow University, and admitted as an advocate in 1932. He served in the Royal Air Force during World War II, then resumed his legal practice and took silk in 1949.

In 1964, he was appointed as Solicitor General for Scotland in Harold Wilson's first government. He held that post until the following year, when he was appointed as a judge to the College of Justice, replacing Charles Shaw, Baron Kilbrandon. He was cautious when hearing trials, and deferred to other judges in appeal cases.

Leechman retired from the judiciary in 1976, and then edited some of his session cases.

== Personal life ==
Leechman married Margaret Helen Edgar in 1935. They had two daughters. He died in May 1986, aged 79.

Legal offices
Preceded by Norman Wylie	Solicitor General for Scotland; 1964–1965	Succeeded by Henry Wilson
