= Accession and Coronation Act 1567 =

Act passed by Parliament of Scotland

- Act of Parliament
- Parliament of Scotland
- Long title: Act Anent the demission of the Crown in favour of our Sovereign Lord, and his Majesty's Coronation.
- Citation: December 1567 c. 1

Dates
- Royal assent: 12 December 1567

Other legislation
- Repealed by: Statute Law Revision (Scotland) Act 1906

Status: Repealed

The Accession and Coronation Act 1567 (December c. 1) was an act of the Parliament of Scotland passed on 12 December 1567. It confirmed the abdication of Mary, Queen of Scots, in favour of her son, James VI.

== Summary ==
=== Dethronement and coronation ===
The 1567 December act of Parliament narrated that Mary I (who was a prisoner at Lochleven Castle after her capture at Carberry Hill) had signed and sealed letters making over the Crown and "regiment of the realm of Scotland" to James VI on 24 July 1567 and appointing regents. The coronation of James VI on 29 July 1567 at Stirling was deemed lawful. Queen Mary's reasons for her removal were given as vexation and weariness.

Two statements had been signed by Mary on 24 July, giving this reason for her abdication, mentioning her spiritual and physical exhaustion;

"not onlie is our body, spirite and sencis sa vexit, brokin and unquyetit that langer we ar not of habilitie be ony meane to indure sa greit and intollerabill panis and travellis, quhairwith we ar altogidder weryit, bot als greit commotiounis and troublis be sindrie occasiounis in the meintyme hes ensewit thairin, to our greit greif."

not only is our body, spirit and senses so vexed, broken and disquietened that (no) longer are we of the ability by any means to endure so great and intolerable pains and ordeals, with which we are altogether wearied, and as great commotions and troubles by sundry causes in the meantime has ensued therein, to, our great grief.

On 25 July 1567 Lord Lindsay had brought this resignation, or commission, to the Tolbooth of Edinburgh where it was read aloud. The statements were produced again and read on 29 July in the Holy Rude Kirk at Stirling before the coronation of James VI, after Lindsay and Lord Ruthven declared on oath that Mary had "resigned willingly without compulsion." Mary's half-brother, James Stewart, 1st Earl of Moray, would rule as regent on behalf of the infant king. Because the Earl of Moray was not in Scotland at the time, the second statement provided a committee of seven joint depute regents to rule till he returned. The Earl of Morton made the oath of regency on behalf of Moray, then the infant king was anointed by Adam Bothwell, Bishop of Orkney. This arrangement of rule by regents was intended to last for 17 years until James VI was of age.

=== December act of Parliament ===
On 4 December 1567 Moray's privy council had made an act prior to the sitting of the Parliament, which declared that not only was the Earl of Bothwell guilty of the murder of Henry Stuart, Lord Darnley, but Mary herself was by "diverse her previe letters writtin and subscrivit with hir awin hand and sent by hir to James erll Boithvile chief executor of the said horrible murthour, ..., it is maist certain that sche wes previe, art and part, (complicit) and of the actuale devise (plot) and deid of the foir-nemmit murther of her lawful husband."

The parliament heard Mary's purported letters of resignation again and accepted the authority of Regent Moray, but also asked for his explanation for Mary's detention at Lochleven Castle;

This present assemblie, considering the detentioune of the quenis grace in the hous of Lochlevin (na manifest declaratioun maid of the occasioun thairof), quhairfoir thai, as ane member of the commone weill of this realme, not onlie for thame selfis bot als in name of the commone people thairof, desyris and maist humilie requiris my Lord Regent and estatis of parliament to oppin and mak manifest unto thame and to the people the caus of the detentioun of the quenis grace in the said house, or ellis to put hir to libertie furth of the samyn.

== Aftermath ==
A year later, the document called "Hay's Article's" claimed that the discovery of the casket letters in June 1567 had resulted in Mary signing at Loch Leven. Mary would later claim that she signed the papers at Loch Leven under compulsion, and on the advice of the English ambassador Nicholas Throckmorton, who had assured her that they could not have legal validity, and when threatened by Scottish nobles and lairds including the Earl of Atholl, William Kirkcaldy of Grange, William Murray of Tullibardine, and Robert Melville.

Mary escaped from Lochleven Castle in May 1568. At Hamilton she gave her oath that she had made her abdication under duress and had a strongly-worded revocation of the demission drafted by her lawyer Sir John Spens of Condie, denouncing the Earl of Morton, the Earl of Moray, the Earl of Mar, and many others.

Her supporters were defeated at the battle of Langside and she went into exile and captivity in England. Mary wrote to Elizabeth from Workington Hall on 17 May 1568, mentioning the threats used to make sign the demission. She sent George Douglas to France as her witness. Over the next five years, her supporters in Scotland fought a civil war against the regents who ruled Scotland in the name of James VI. Her supporters called a Parliament in Edinburgh in June 1571, and produced a document in which she described threats used to gain her agreement.

In the 1580s, Mary attempted to negotiate her return to Scotland and conjoint rule with James VI, a scheme known as the "association". Mary declared her abdication in 1567 was obtained under duress and was invalid.
