= Ruth Charteris =

Scottish advocate (born 1973)

The Right Honourable Ruth Charteris KC
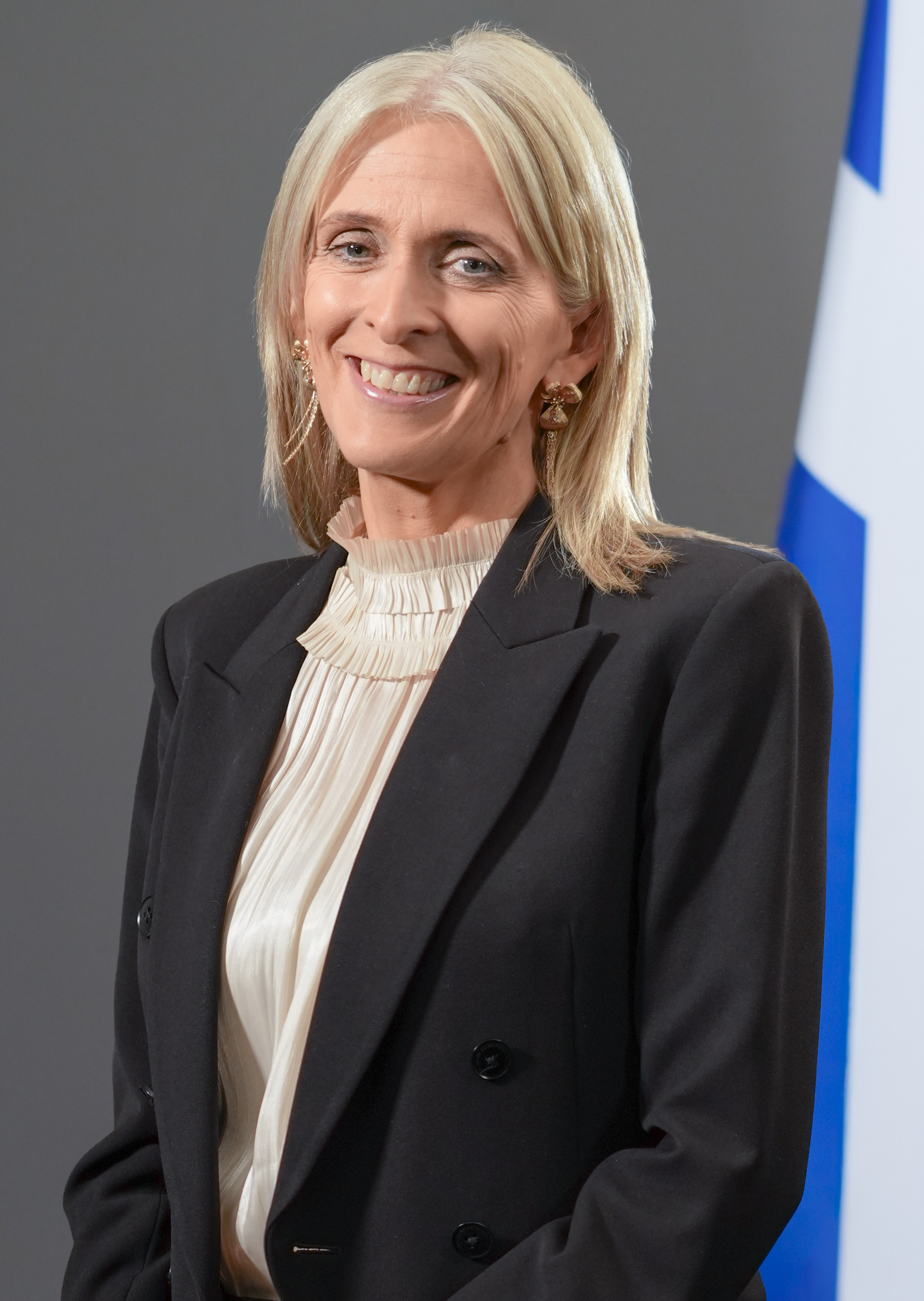
- Official portrait, 2026

Lord Advocate
- Incumbent
- Assumed office 19 June 2026
- Monarch: Charles III
- First Minister: John Swinney
- Preceded by: Dorothy Bain

Solicitor General for Scotland
- In office 22 June 2021 – 19 June 2026
- Monarchs: Elizabeth II; Charles III
- First Minister: Nicola Sturgeon; Humza Yousaf; John Swinney
- Preceded by: Alison Di Rollo
- Succeeded by: Brian Gill

Personal details
- Born: Ruth Barbara Charteris; 1973 (age 52–53) Glasgow, Scotland
- Party: Independent
- Education: University of Glasgow
- Occupation: Advocate
- Profession: Lawyer

Ruth Barbara Charteris KC (born 1973) is a Scottish advocate who has served as Lord Advocate since June 2026. Charteris served as Solicitor General for Scotland from 2021 until her appointment as Lord Advocate in 2026, replacing Dorothy Bain KC. Brian Gill KC was appointed in June 2026 as Charteris’ deputy to succeed her as Solicitor General.

Charteris is a legally qualified chair of the Scottish Social Services Council since 2017, and has served as Chair of the Fitness to Practice Panel of the SSSC since 2017.

== Early life and education ==
Born in 1973 in Glasgow, Charteris studied at the University of Glasgow School of Law, where she gained an LLB (Hons) degree and a diploma in legal practice.

== Career ==
=== Early legal career ===
Charteris was admitted as an advocate in 2000 and came to the Bar on completion of her post as Legal Assistant to the Lord President of the Court of Session. Charteris served as an ad hoc Advocate Depute from 2010 to 2016. She served as a Standing Junior to the Scottish Government from 2012 and Second Standing Junior to the Scottish Government from 2016 to 2020. After her appointment as Queen's Counsel, she served as a full-time Advocate Depute from 2020 until her appointment as Solicitor General.

=== Scottish Social Services Council ===
Charteris has been a legally qualified chair of the Scottish Social Services Council since 2017. She has been Chair of the Fitness to Practice Panel of the SSSC since 2017.

== Solicitor General, 2021–2026 ==
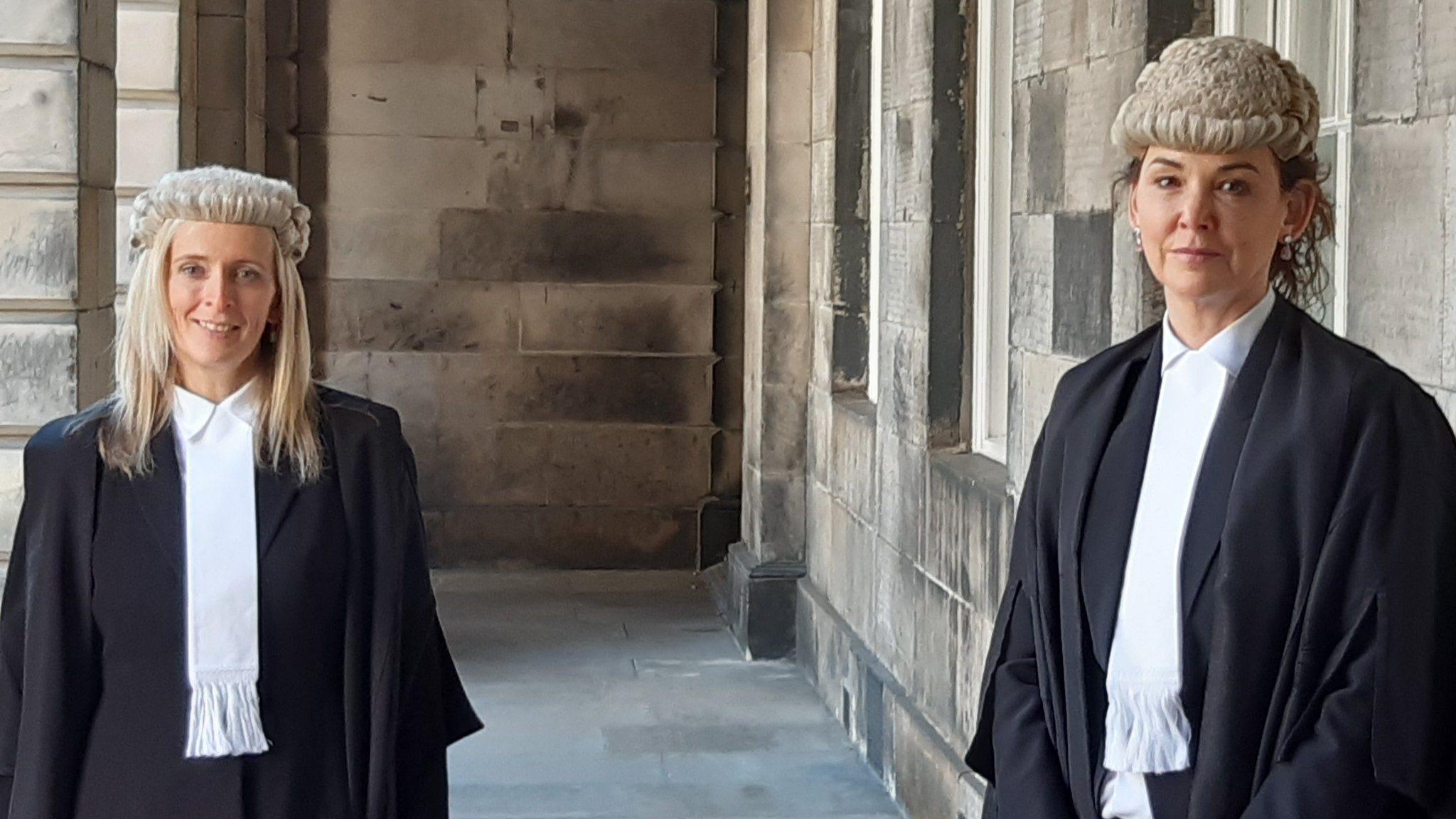
Charteris alongside Dorothy Bain KC, following their appointment as Scotland's law officers at the Court of Session, June 2021

=== Appointment and Resignation ===
On 16 June 2021 the Scottish Government announced that Nicola Sturgeon had recommended Charteris to the Scottish Parliament for appointment as Solicitor General for Scotland by Elizabeth II. Her nomination as Solicitor General was approved by the Scottish Parliament on 17 June 2021.

The appointment of Charteris as Solicitor General and Dorothy Bain KC as Lord Advocate marked the first time that both of Scotland's top law officers were both women.

On her elevated appointment to the office of Lord Advocate on 19 June 2026, she was succeeded in her role as Solicitor General by Brian Gill KC.

=== Duties ===
Charteris was selected as the annual speaker at the Annual Reflections Lecture at the Edinburgh Foundation for Women in Law event. In 2023, as Solicitor General for Scotland, she was instructed by First Minister Humza Yousaf to "fully investigate" claims that the Scottish Government had not handed over WhatsApp communications and text messages which were exchanged between senior government officials during the height of the COVID-19 pandemic in Scotland, following claims made during the United Kingdom COVID-19 inquiry. Yousaf had claimed that it was his "understanding" that all messages required had been handed over.

== Lord Advocate, 2026– ==
It was announced on 16 June 2026 that John Swinney had nominated Charteris to be Lord Advocate, replacing Dorothy Bain who had announced that she was stepping down. On her nomination, she issued a statement in which she publicly thanked the first minister, saying "I recognise the importance and the responsibility of this role and if I am appointed, it will be a great privilege to serve the people of Scotland". On 19 June 2026, she was sworn in at Parliament House, Edinburgh.

Her appointment to the position was overseen by the Lord President of the Court of Session, Lord Pentland, who said of Charteris upon her appointment "you take up your new role with great experience of leadership in our country’s prosecution service", whilst further claiming her "substantial knowledge of civil and public law will assist you as principal legal adviser to the Scottish Ministers".

Charteris became a member of the Privy Council on 14 October 2026.

== Personal life ==
She grew up as a Christian, and is a member of Dowanvale Free Church of Scotland in Glasgow, and a member of the Lawyers Christian Fellowship.

== See also ==
- Law Officers of the Crown
