= B. J. Gill =

Solicitor General for Scotland since 2026

B. J. Gill KC
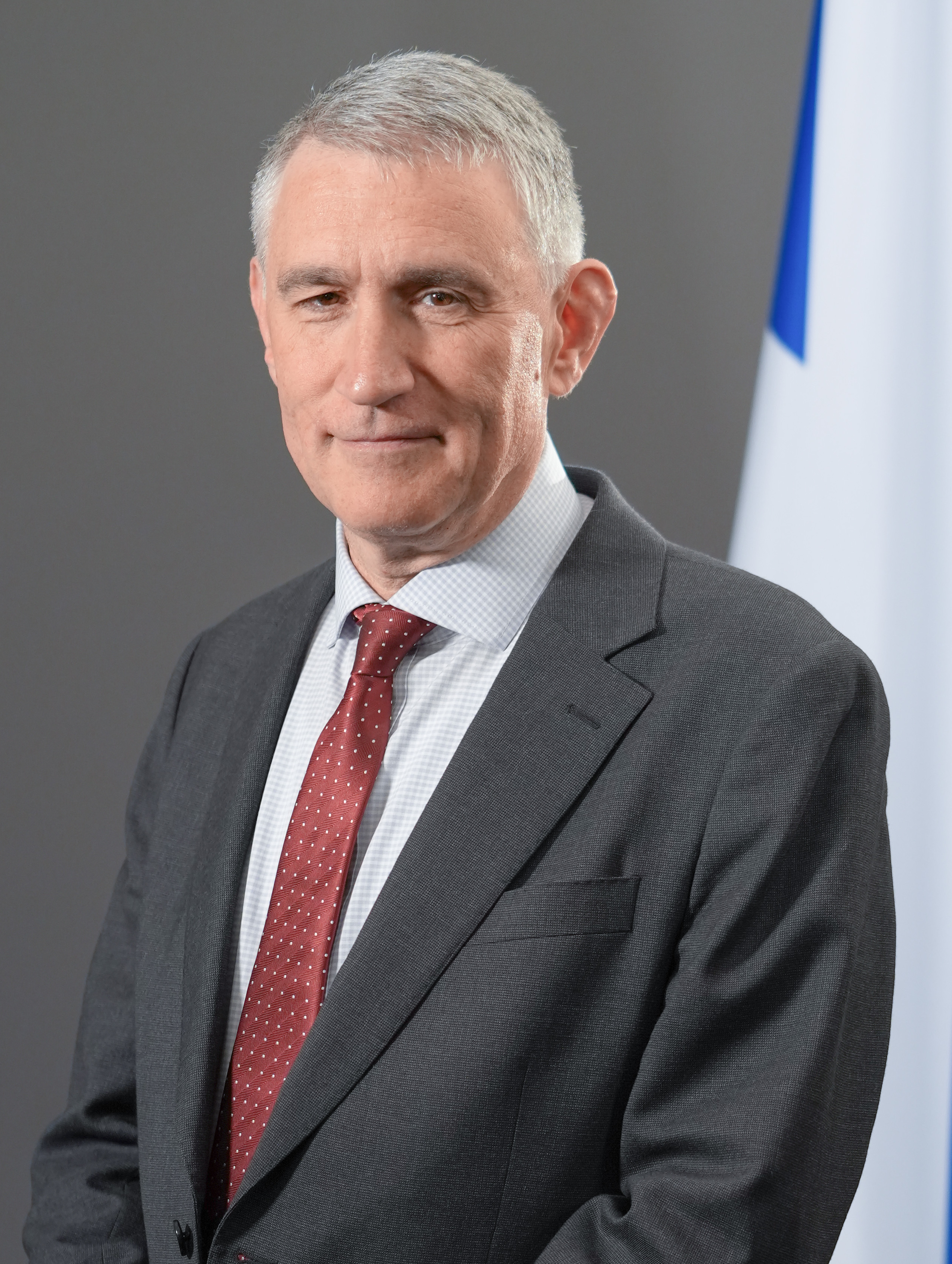
- Official portrait, 2026

Solicitor General for Scotland
- Incumbent
- Assumed office 19 June 2026
- Monarch: Charles III
- First Minister: John Swinney
- Lord Advocate: Ruth Charteris
- Preceded by: Ruth Charteris

Personal details
- Born: Brian John Gill
- Occupation: Advocate
- Profession: Lawyer

Brian John Gill KC is a Scottish advocate who has served as Solicitor General for Scotland since June 2026. Gill previously served as a Senior Advocate Depute and Standing Junior Counsel to the Advocate General for Scotland.

== Solicitor General for Scotland ==
In June 2026, Gill was named as the successor of Ruth Charteris for the office of Solicitor General for Scotland. On his nomination, Gill said that he was "delighted and honoured to be recommended for this appointment and I look forward to working with and supporting Ruth Charteris, if approved by Parliament".
