= Henry Wilson, Baron Wilson of Langside =

The Right Honourable The Lord Wilson of Langside PC QC

Lord Advocate
- In office 1967–1970

Solicitor General for Scotland
- In office 1965–1967

Personal details
- Born: Henry Stephen Wilson; 21 March 1916 Glasgow, Scotland, UK
- Died: 23 November 1997 (aged 81)
- Party: Labour (until 1981); SDP (1981–88) 'Continuing' SDP (1988–90); SDP (1990) (1990–92); Non-affiliated (from 1992)
- Education: University of Glasgow

Henry Stephen Wilson, Baron Wilson of Langside (21 March 1916 – 23 November 1997) was a Scottish lawyer, Labour politician and life peer.

== Life and career ==
The son of Margaret Young and James Wilson, a solicitor, he was educated at the High School of Glasgow and the University of Glasgow. He joined the Army in 1939 and served with the Highland Light Infantry and Royal Armoured Corps during World War II. He was called to the Scottish Bar in 1946, and served as an Advocate Depute from 1948–51 and as Sheriff-substitute at Greenock from 1955–56 and in Glasgow from 1956–65. He took silk in 1965.

He was Solicitor General for Scotland from 1965–67 and Lord Advocate from 1967–70. He was Director of the Scottish Courts Administration from 1971–74 and Sheriff Principal of Glasgow and Strathkelvin from 1975–77.

He was aboard the cruise ship Lakonia when she caught fire and sank with the loss of 128 lives in 1963.

== Politics ==
Wilson was the unsuccessful Labour candidate for Dumfriesshire in 1950 and 1955 and for Edinburgh West in 1951. He was appointed a Privy Counsellor in 1967. On 3 March 1968 he was created a life peer with the title Baron Wilson of Langside, of Broughton in the County of the City of Edinburgh, taking the Labour whip.

Although a faithful Labour supporter throughout the post-war years, Wilson was one of those who experienced dissatisfaction with the party's performance in government during the latter stages of the 1970s, as it failed to combat declining economic performance and trade union militancy. He was also a critic of its support for Scottish devolution, campaigning against the establishment of a Scottish Assembly both before and during the 1979 referendum on the matter. Thus, at the 1979 general election, The Glasgow Herald reported him as one of several former Labour MPs and ministers who were instead backing Margaret Thatcher's Conservatives.

Following the breakaway of a number of Labour MPs to form the Social Democratic Party (SDP) in 1981, Wilson joined the new party and remained a member until its merger with the Liberals in 1988, when he instead aligned himself with David Owen's rump 'continuing' SDP. Upon that party's dissolution in 1990, he was a member of its successor party for a further two years, thereafter sitting in the House of Lords as a crossbencher until his death.

Legal offices
Preceded by James Leechman	Solicitor General for Scotland; 1965–1967	Succeeded by Ewan Stewart
Preceded by Gordon Stott	Lord Advocate; 1967–1970	Succeeded by Norman Wylie
