= Ewan George Francis Stewart, Lord Stewart =

Scottish lawyer and judge (1923–1987)

The Honourable Lord Stewart MC

Senator of the College of Justice in Scotland
- In office 1975–1987

Solicitor General for Scotland
- In office 1967–1970
- Preceded by: Henry Wilson
- Succeeded by: David Brand

Personal details
- Born: Ewan George Francis Stewart

Ewan George Francis Stewart, Lord Stewart, MC (9 May 1923 – 31 March 1987) was a Scottish lawyer, judge, and politician. He was Solicitor General for Scotland from 1967 to 1970 and a Senator of the College of Justice in Scotland from 1975.
