= Michael Bruce, Lord Marnoch =

Scottish judge

The Right Honourable Lord Marnoch

Senator of the College of Justice in Scotland
- In office 1990–2005
- Preceded by: Lord Brand

Personal details
- Born: Michael Stewart Rae Bruce; 26 July 1938 (age 88)

Michael Stewart Rae Bruce, Lord Marnoch, PC (born 26 July 1938) is a retired Scottish lawyer and judge. He was a Senator of the College of Justice in Scotland from 1990 to 2005.

== Biography ==
The son of an Aberdeen solicitor, Bruce was educated at Loretto School and the University of Aberdeen. He qualified as a lawyer in 1963 and was appointed a Queen's Counsel in 1975. He was an advocate depute from 1983 to 1986.

Bruce was appointed a Senator of the College of Justice in 1990, succeeding Lord Brand. He was sworn of the Privy Council in 2001. He retired from judicial service in 2005.

In 2000, he sentenced murderer Pamela Gourlay to a minimum of 14 years' imprisonment; the sentence was overturned on appeal the following year by judges who ruled that Lord Marnoch had "overreacted".

In 2004, a Scottish legal magazine ranked Lord Marnoch "bottom in a league table of judges", based on a poll of members of the Faculty of Advocates. Lord Marnoch complained to the Press Complaints Commission, which took no further action after the magazine published a clarification that the table was based on 20 responses.
