= Robert Crichton (Lord Advocate) =

Robert Crichton or Creighton, Lord Elliock (1530–1591), of Elliock, in Nithsdale, was joint Lord Advocate. He purchased Clunie Castle and the adjoining lands from the Diocese of Dunkeld where his cousin, Robert Crichton, was bishop.

== Life ==
He was born at Elliock House in January 1530, the son of John Crichton of Sanquhar and Mary Carmichael.

In February 1581 he was elected a Senator of the College of Justice.

He appears to have left Scotland in 1582 and he died at Kielce in Poland on 15 May 1591.

== Family ==
He married three times, firstly c.1550 to Isobella Borthwick, daughter of David Borthwick, Lord Lochill a Senator of the College of Justice.

In May 1558 he married Elizabeth Stewart (1535-1568), daughter of Sir James Stewart of Beith.

They had six children including Sir Robert Crichton of Cluny (b.1564) and James "The Admirable" Crichton.

He married his third wife in August 1572, Agnes Mowbray (d. 1575), a daughter of John Mowbray of Barnbougle.
