= John McCluskey, Baron McCluskey =

Scottish lawyer, judge and politician

The Right Honourable The Lord McCluskey
- McCluskey in 2016

Member of the House of Lords
- Lord Temporal
- Life peerage 29 September 1976 – 1 March 2017

Senator of the College of Justice
- In office 1984–2004
- Monarch: Elizabeth

Solicitor General for Scotland
- In office 1974–1979
- Monarch: Elizabeth
- Preceded by: William Stewart (later Lord Allanbridge)
- Succeeded by: Nicholas Fairbairn

Personal details
- Born: John Herbert McCluskey; 12 June 1929
- Died: 20 July 2017 (aged 88)
- Party: Crossbench (c. 1984–2017); Labour (1974–1984)
- Spouse: Ruth Friedland (m. 1956; died 2014)
- Education: University of Edinburgh
- Profession: Lawyer

John Herbert McCluskey, Baron McCluskey (12 June 1929 – 20 July 2017) was a Scottish lawyer, judge and politician, who served as Solicitor General for Scotland, the country's junior Law Officer from 1974 to 1979, and as a Senator of the College of Justice, a judge of Scotland's Supreme Courts, from 1984 to 2004. He was also member of the House of Lords from 1976 until his retirement in 2017.

== Early life ==
McCluskey was born on 12 June 1929, one of four sons of solicitor Francis McCluskey and his wife, Margaret. He was educated at St. Bede's Grammar School in Manchester and at Holy Cross Academy, Edinburgh. He studied at the University of Edinburgh and graduated with an MA in 1950. He was awarded the Vans Dunlop scholarship and graduated a LLB in 1952. He did his national service in the Royal Air Force as a pilot officer stationed on the Isle of Man and then at RAF Spitalgate and was awarded the station's Sword of Honour in 1953. He was admitted to the Faculty of Advocates in 1955.

== Career ==
McCluskey was briefly Standing Junior Counsel, a legal advisor to a government department, to the Ministry of Power in Scotland in 1962. He served as an Advocate Depute, a Crown prosecutor, from 1964 to 1971, being appointed Queen's Counsel (QC) in 1967. In 1972 he became chairman on the Medical Appeal Tribunals for Scotland and became chairman of a working party on forensic pathology services in Scotland. As an advocate, he defended Paul McCartney against drugs charges in March 1973 when a trial took place in Campbelltown. He caused uproar in court when he asked if McCartney could have "time to pay" a £30 fine. He became Sheriff Principal of Dumfries and Galloway in December 1973.

McCluskey was appointed Solicitor General for Scotland in March 1974 in the new Labour government of Harold Wilson. On 29 September 1976 he was created a life peer as Baron McCluskey, of Churchhill in the District of the City of Edinburgh. This was so that he could help steer the Devolution bill through the House of Lords. He remained as Solicitor General until the Conservative victory in the 1979 election at which point he returned to private practice. With Labour in Opposition he continued as their Spokesperson for Scottish Legal Affairs until 1984.

In December 1984, McCluskey was appointed a Senator of the College of Justice, a judge of the Court of Session and High Court of Justiciary, Scotland's supreme courts. Already being a peer, he used his noble title whilst sitting on the Bench. He was the first serving judge to deliver the BBC's Reith Lectures, which he gave in 1986 on Law, Justice and Democracy in which he discusses his ideas of what judges should and should not be involved in. In 1989 the University of Dundee gave him an honorary doctorate. In 1992 he presided over the trial of Paul Ferris, who was accused of a gangland murder. The trial lasted 54 days and cost £4 million, which at the time was the longest and most expensive criminal trial in Scottish legal history.

He was involved with helping safeguard the independence of the judiciary from a provision contained in the bill that became the Scotland Act 1998.

In March 1999 he presided over the first trial held after the murder of Surjit Singh Chhokar at the Glasgow High Court, although that had only led to a conviction of assault. McCluskey was Scotland's longest-serving judge at the time, and was highly critical that only one person had appeared in the dock. In July of that year, he addressed the Law Society of Scotland's 50th annual conference and suggested that a Royal Commission should look at sentencing of drug offenders.

From 1988 to 2005, he was editor of Butterworth's Scottish Criminal Law and Practice series. He was a friend of the Labour leader John Smith, and played tennis with him. He was a trustee of the John Smith Memorial Trust, and for a time chaired the trustee board. In 2007 Gordon Brown announced that McCluskey was one of the people who had been asked for advice on what changes Labour should make in handling donations. He also chaired the Scottish Association of Mental Health and Age Concern.

== Retirement ==
McCluskey took retirement from the Bench in 2000, although he did continue to sit occasionally as a judge until 2004. He sat on the Scottish Football Association (SFA)'s disciplinary appeal panels and in 2002 he suggested that they review their procedures around the use of video evidence. In 2005, during an interview with The Scotsman he put forward view that the drugs policy set by Westminster had been failing over many years and that heroin use could be treated as a medical problem rather than a legal one.

In June 2011, the Scottish Government announced he would chair a panel of experts examining the position of the UK Supreme Court in relation to Scottish cases raising human rights issues. The formation of this panel came about after rulings by the Supreme Court in the Cadder and Nat Fraser cases, in which the Court had found violations by Scottish police of the European Convention on Human Rights where Scottish courts had found none. The panel heard evidence and reported in September of that year, making recommendations that included the UK Supreme Court continuing to have a role in Scottish cases, but with limited jurisdiction.

After the Leveson Inquiry published its report in November 2012, an Expert Panel was established in the Scottish Parliament to consider the regulation of the press in Scotland and McCluskey was invited to be chair. The panel reported in March 2013 and recommended that there should be statutory controls which are underpinned by law.

On 1 March 2017 he retired from the House of Lords on the grounds of ill health. That month he received a Lifetime Achievement award at the Scottish Legal Awards.

== Personal life ==
While on national service he met Ruth Friedland and they married in 1956. They adopted two sons and a daughter. His wife Ruth died in 2014.

He died age 88 on 20 July 2017.

Legal offices
Preceded by William Stewart	Solicitor General for Scotland; 1974–1979	Succeeded by Nicholas Fairbairn
