= Gordon Stott, Lord Stott =

Scottish lawyer (1909 – 1999)

The Right Honourable Lord Stott

Lord Advocate
- In office 1964–1967
- Preceded by: Ian Hamilton Shearer
- Succeeded by: Henry Stephen Wilson

Personal details
- Born: 22 December 1909
- Died: 12 April 1999 (aged 89)
- Spouse: Nancy Braggins
- Occupation: Advocate, sheriff, Lord Advocate, senior judge
- Known for: Diaries

George Gordon Stott, Lord Stott, PC (22 December 1909 – 12 April 1999) was a Scottish advocate, sheriff and Lord Advocate, the chief legal officer for the Crown and government in Scotland. In retirement Gordon Stott published three volumes of extracts from the diaries he had been keeping throughout his legal career.

== Personal life ==
Gordon Stott was born in 1909, youngest son of Rev Dr George Stott, minister of Cramond Kirk, Edinburgh, and Flora Stott. He attended the village school, and went on to Edinburgh Academy and Edinburgh University, where he graduated with first-class honours in Classics and won the Vans Dunlop Scholarship in law.

He was a pacifist, and during World War II he was a conscientious objector, working on the land as alternative to military service. On behalf of other conscientious objectors, he acted as pro bono counsel at tribunals for conscientious objectors. From 1939 to 1944 he edited a Labour journal, the Edinburgh Clarion.

He unsuccessfully stood for parliament as Labour candidate for Central Aberdeenshire in 1935, Edinburgh West in 1945 and Edinburgh North in 1959. He was a founder member of the Muir Society of Labour Lawyers and secretary of the Edinburgh and District Trades Council.

In 1947 he married Nancy Braggins and they had two children, Elizabeth and Richard. His hobbies were walking, fishing, reading and golf.

Stott was friendly and compassionate, with a plain-spoken and independent manner that showed little tolerance for hypocrisy. Of the government of which he had been a member he wrote "On Vietnam the Government gave the appearance of being committed to support the United States whose bombing aeroplanes continued for no intelligible purpose to lavish on that unfortunate country an increasingly powerful but futile demonstration of the American way of death".

In his retirement Stott published three volumes of his diaries filled with amusing and indiscreet anecdotes: Lord Advocate's Diary (1991), Judge's Diary (1995) and QC's Diary (1998).

== Legal career ==
In 1936 Stott was admitted as an advocate to the Faculty of Advocates where his outspoken socialist politics were unpopular. After the war he was an Advocate-Depute (prosecuting counsel); he often acted in industrial accident cases. From 1949 to 1956 Stott was a member of the Monopolies and Restrictive Practices Commission. He took silk, KC, in 1950, becoming Queen's Counsel in 1952. His pleading was a model of forceful economy and he was a formidable opponent having the adverse judgements of Lord Clyde (Lord President of the Court of Session) regularly overturned when Stott appealed them to the House of Lords. Stott later said "... the First Division of the Court of Session fell on evil days and there were some atrocious decisions. We had to go frequently to London to get them put right". Stott was Sheriff Principal for the sheriffdom of Roxburgh, Berwick and Selkirk between 1961 and 1964.

At the start of the Wilson Labour government of 1964 Stott was appointed as privy councillor and Lord Advocate, the senior law officer in Scotland As Lord Advocate – he became known as Lord Stott – he enjoyed total independence from the government as a public prosecutor and legal adviser. He was responsible for implementing several reforms in the law and for establishing the Scottish Law Commission. Aware that his position was politically vulnerable, when a senior judicial vacancy became available in 1967, and following tradition, he appointed himself to the bench later saying "I appointed myself, and a jolly good judge I turned out to be". So he became a Senator of the College of Justice (High Court judge in Scotland) in the First Division of the Inner House of the Court of Session appeal court. Dealing with custody cases he would often chat informally with the children involved. A boy had said he would prefer to stay with his father. Stott wrote "When I asked him why, he said 'It's the mince. It's not watery'."

He retired at the statutory age of 75 in 1984.

== Publications ==
- Stott, Gordon (1991). Lord Advocate's diary, 1961-1966. Aberdeen: Aberdeen University Press. ISBN 978-0080413990.
- Stott, Gordon (1995). Judge's Diary, 1967-1973. Edinburgh: Mercat Press. ISBN 978-1873644430.
- Stott, Gordon (1998). Q.C.'s diary, 1954-1960. Edinburgh: Mercat Press. ISBN 978-1873644713.

== Notes ==
Legal offices
Preceded by Ian Hamilton Shearer	Lord Advocate; 1964–1967	Succeeded by Henry Stephen Wilson
