= Solicitor General for Scotland =

Law officer

Scotland His Majesty's Solicitor General
- Scottish Gaelic: Àrd-neach-lagha
- Crest from the Royal Coat of Arms of Scotland as used by the Solicitor General

- Flag of Scotland

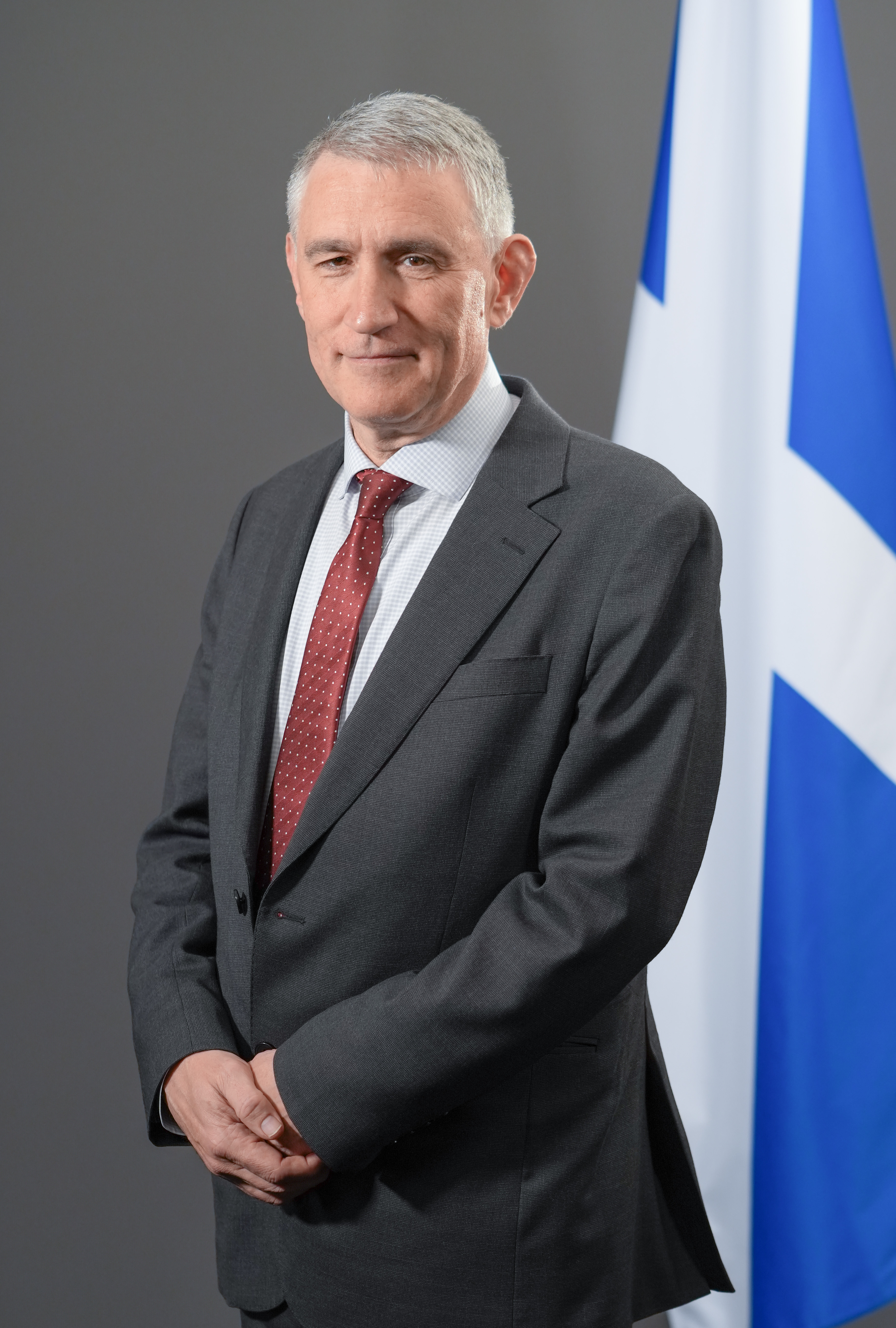
- Incumbent; B. J. Gill KC since 19 June 2026
- Crown Office and Procurator Fiscal Service
- Type: Law officer of the Crown
- Member of: Scottish Cabinet; Cabinet Sub-Committee on Legislation; Scottish Government Legal Directorate
- Reports to: First Minister
- Appointer: Monarch on the advice of the First Minister
- Salary: £115,700 per annum (2023)
- Website: Scottish Government | Solicitor General

His Majesty's Solicitor General, also known as the Solicitor General (Scottish Gaelic: Àrd-neach-lagha), is one of the Law Officers of the Crown, and the deputy to the Lord Advocate. The Lord Advocate's duty is to advise the Scottish Government on Scots Law alongside the Solicitor General for Scotland. They are also responsible for the Crown Office and Procurator Fiscal Service which together constitute the Criminal Prosecution Service in Scotland.

Together with the Lord Advocate, the Solicitor General for Scotland is one of the senior legal advisors to the government in Scotland. Whilst the Solicitor General for Scotland supports the Lord Advocate in their functions, the Solicitor General may also exercise their statutory and common law powers when necessary.

== History ==
Until 1999, when the Scottish Parliament and Scottish Executive were created, the Lord Advocate and the Solicitor General for Scotland advised Her Majesty's Government. Since their transfer to the Scottish Government, the British Government has been advised on Scots Law by the Advocate General for Scotland. Until 2007, both the Lord Advocate and the Solicitor General attended the weekly meetings of the Scottish cabinet, until then–First Minister Alex Salmond ended this in an attempt to "de-politicise the post". Both the Lord Advocate and Solicitor General remain members of the Scottish Government as the two senior law officers, and may still attend cabinet meetings if legal issues are expected to arise.

In 2021, there were calls for the Scottish Government to review the post of Lord Advocate in its current form, which sees the post holder being the principal legal adviser to the Scottish Government as well as serving as the head of the prosecution's system in Scotland. The Scotland Act 1998 allows for the amendment of both the Lord Advocate and Solicitor General for Scotland's post and functions which would allow the Scottish Government to separate the roles of both prosecutor and the principal government adviser between the two law officer posts – the Lord Advocate and the Solicitor General for Scotland. If such changes were implemented by the Scottish Government to amend the post, it could see that the Lord Advocate continues as the head of Scotland's prosecution service, whilst no longer attending cabinet meetings of the Scottish Government. As a result, the responsibility of principal legal adviser to the Scottish Government would subsequently pass to the Solicitor General for Scotland who would be required to attend cabinet meetings when necessary.

It has been argued by Scott Crichton Styles of the Press and Journal that the position of Solicitor General and the Lord Advocate will "always be accused of being biased unless the role is changed", citing the legal case HM Advocate v Salmond and the subsequent issues this case caused, considering the Lord Advocate and Solicitor General for Scotland is expected to conduct their duties independent of the government. A consultation of Scottish lawyers in 2021 found an overwhelming majority of those asked were in favour of the Lord Advocate's role to be split. Both the government of Nicola Sturgeon and Sturgeon's successor, the Yousaf government, have committed to a review of the Lord Advocate's by the end of the current Scottish Parliamentary term in 2026.

The appointment of Ruth Charteris when she was Solicitor General, and former Lord Advocate Dorothy Bain respectively marked the first time that the two senior law officers in Scotland has been held by women at the same time.

As of June 2026, the Solicitor General is B. J. Gill, who succeeded the now Lord Advocate, Ruth Charteris.

In September 2026, the Scottish Government announced a review of the roles of Solicitor General and Lord Advocate.

== Responsibilities ==
Ultimately, the office holder of Solicitor General for Scotland is the deputy to the Lord Advocate, and assists the incumbent Lord Advocate in carrying out the duties of their post. Like the Lord Advocate, the Solicitor General is a member of the Scottish Government and one of the Law officers of the Crown in Scotland. The Solicitor General is a member of the Crown Office and Procurator Fiscal Service, and may be instructed by the First Minister to investigate matters on their behalf rather than the Lord Advocate.

In 2023, the Solicitor General for Scotland was instructed by the incumbent First Minister of Scotland Humza Yousaf to "fully investigate" claims made during the United Kingdom's COVID-19 inquiry regarding messages and WhatsApp messages not being handed over by senior government officials for investigation. Yousaf claimed that it "was his understanding" that all messages required had been handed over for scrutiny during the inquiry, but had confirmed "if there are any concerns raised they will be fully investigated and I will ask the solicitor general to investigate them."

== List of Solicitors General for Scotland ==
List from 1647. Until 1764, the office was at times held jointly.

=== Pre-Union ===
- 1647–1662: Robert Dalgleish
- 1662–1684: Sir William Purves (jointly with John Purves 1678–1684, jointly with George Bannerman 1683–1684 but this appointment was ineffective)
- 1684–1687: George Bannerman and Robert Colt
- 1687–1689: James Graham
- 1689–1693: Sir William Lockhart
- 1693–1696: Sir James Ogilvy
- 1696–1700: Sir Patrick Hume
- 1701–1706: Sir David Dalrymple of Hailes
- 1701–1709: William Carmichael

=== Post-Union ===
- 1709–1714: Thomas Kennedy* & Sir James Stewart, 1st Baronet
- 1714–1716: John Carnegie of Boyseck
- 1714–1717: Sir James Stewart, 1st Baronet
- 1717–1720: Robert Dundas, the elder*
- 1720–1721: Walter Stewart
- 1721–1733: John Sinclair
- 1721–1725: Charles Binning
- 1725–1737: Charles Erskine*
- 1737–1742: William Grant of Prestongrange*
- 1742–1746: Robert Dundas, the younger*
- 1746–1755: Patrick Haldane of Gleneagles & Alexander Hume
- 1755–1759: Andrew Pringle of Alemore
- 1759–1760: Thomas Miller*
- 1760–1764: James Montgomery* & Francis Garden
- 1764–1766: James Montgomery*
- 1766–1775: Henry Dundas*
- 1775–1783: Alexander Murray
- 1783: Ilay Campbell*
- 1783–1784: Alexander Wight
- 1784–1789: Robert Dundas*
- 1789–1806: Robert Blair
- 1806–1807: John Clerk
- 1807–1811: David Boyle
- 1811–1813: David Monypenny
- 1813–1816: Alexander Maconochie*
- 1816–1822: James Wedderburn
- 1822–1830: John Hope
- 1830–1834: Henry Cockburn
- 1834–1835: Andrew Skene
- 1835: Duncan McNeill*
- 1835–1837: John Cunninghame
- 1837–1839: Andrew Rutherfurd*
- 1839–1840: James Ivory
- 1840–1841: Thomas Maitland
- 1841–1842: Duncan McNeill*
- 1842–1846: Adam Anderson*
- 1846–1850: Thomas Maitland
- 1850–1851: James Moncreiff*
- 1851: John Cowan
- 1851–1852: George Deas
- 1852: John Inglis*
- 1852–1853: Charles Neaves
- 1853: Robert Handyside
- 1853–1855: James Craufurd
- 1855: Thomas Mackenzie
- 1855–1858: Edward Maitland
- 1858: Charles Baillie*
- 1858–1859: David Mure*
- 1859: George Patton*
- 1859–1862: Edward Maitland
- 1862–1866: George Young*
- 1866–1867: Edward Strathearn Gordon*
- 1867–1868: John Millar
- 1868–1869: George Young*
- 1869–1874: Andrew Rutherfurd-Clark
- 1874–1876: John Millar
- 1874–1876: William Watson*
- 1876–1880: John Macdonald*
- 1880–1881: John Balfour*
- 1881–1885: Alexander Asher
- 1885–1886: James Robertson*
- 1886: Alexander Asher
- 1886–1888: James Robertson*
- 1888–1890: Moir Tod Stormonth Darling
- 1890: Sir Charles Pearson*
- 1891–1892: Andrew Murray*
- 1892–1894: Alexander Asher
- 1894–1895: Thomas Shaw*
- 1895–1896: Andrew Murray*
- 1896–1903: Charles Dickson*
- 1903–1905: David Dundas
- 1905: Edward Theodore Salvesen
- October 1905: James Avon Clyde*
- December 1905: Alexander Ure*
- February 1909: Arthur Dewar
- April 1910: William Hunter
- December 1911: Andrew Anderson
- October 1913: Thomas Brash Morison*
- 1920: Charles David Murray*
- March 1922 – July 1922: Andrew Constable
- July 1922 – November 1922: William Watson*
- November 1922: David Fleming
- April 1923: Frederick Thomson
- February 1924: John Charles Fenton
- November 1924: David Fleming
- 1925: Alexander Munro MacRobert*
- 1929: Wilfrid Normand*
- 1929: John Charles Watson
- 1931: Wilfrid Normand*
- 1933: Douglas Jamieson*
- 1935: Thomas Mackay Cooper
- 1935: Albert Russell
- 1936: James Reid
- 1941: Sir David King Murray
- 1945: Daniel Blades
- 1947: John Wheatley*
- 1947: Douglas Johnston
- 1951: William Rankine Milligan*
- 1955: William Grant*
- 1960: David Anderson
- 1964: Norman Wylie* (April to October)
- 1964: James Graham Leechman
- 1965: Henry Wilson*
- 1967: Ewan George Francis Stewart
- 1970: David William Robert Brand
- 1972: William Stewart
- 1974: Lord McCluskey
- 1979: Nicholas Fairbairn
- 1982: Peter Fraser*
- 1989: Alan Rodger*
- 1992: Thomas Dawson
- 1995: Donald Mackay*
- 1995: Paul Cullen
- 1997: Colin Boyd*

=== Post-devolution ===
- 2000: Neil Davidson
- 2001: Elish Angiolini*
- 2006: John Beckett
- 2007: Frank Mulholland*
- 2011: Lesley Thomson
- 2016: Alison Di Rollo
- 2021: Ruth Charteris*
- 2026: B. J. Gill

* = served later as Lord Advocate

== Sources ==
- Most of the above list is taken from Haydn's Book of Dignities, 12th edition (1894, reprinted 1969) and from Oxford Companion to Law, Clarendon Press, 1980.
