= Lord Advocate =

Chief legal officer of the Scottish Government

Scotland His Majesty's Lord Advocate
- Scottish Gaelic: Fear-tagraidh
- Crest from the Royal Coat of Arms of Scotland as used by the lord advocate

- Flag of Scotland

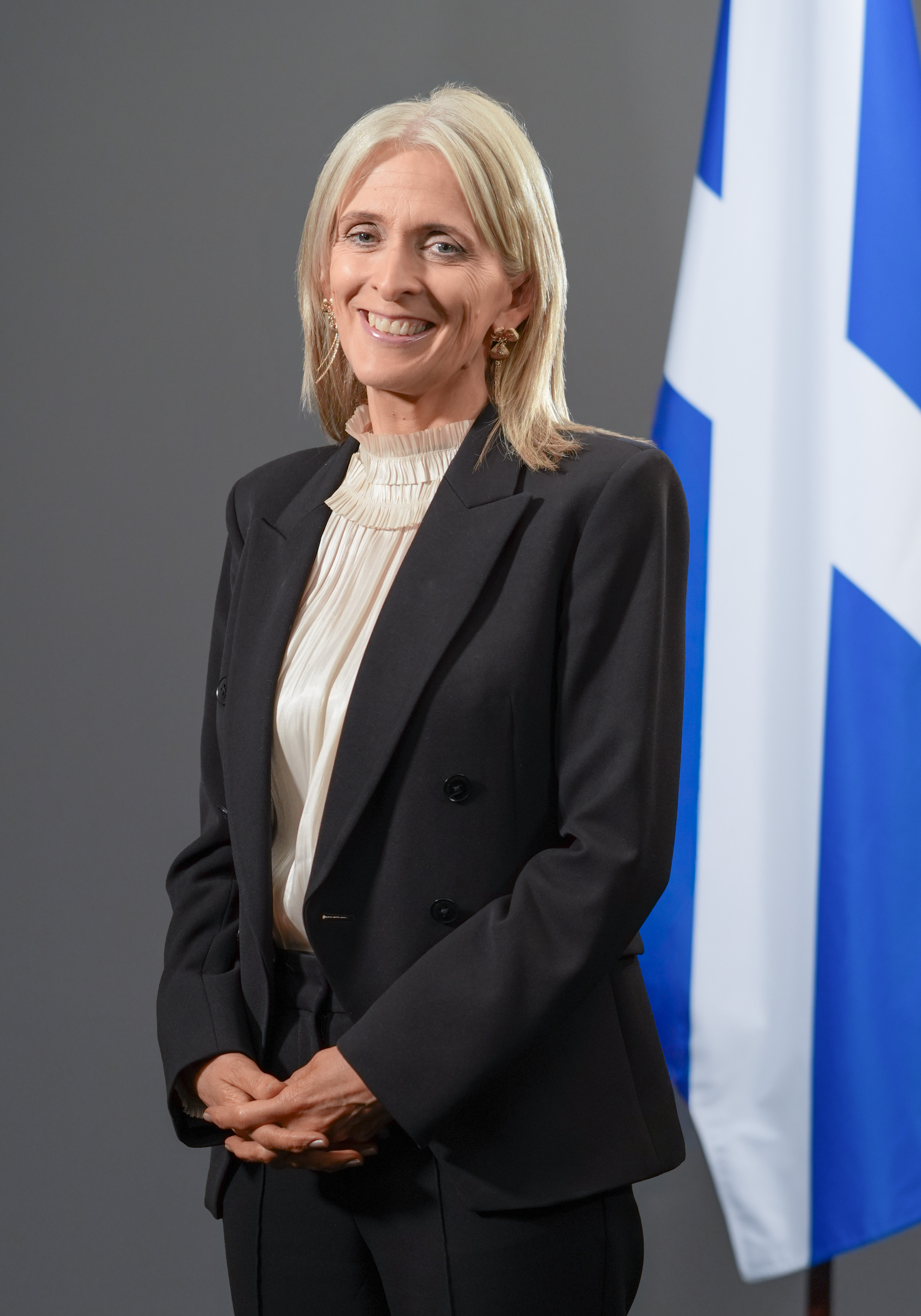
- Incumbent; Ruth Charteris since 19 June 2026
- Crown Office and Procurator Fiscal Service
- Style: The Right Honourable
- Type: Great Officer of State; Law Officer of the Crown; Chief Legal Officer
- Member of: Scottish Cabinet; Privy Council; Cabinet Sub-Committee on Legislation; Scottish Government Legal Directorate
- Reports to: First Minister of Scotland
- Appointer: Monarch on the recommendation of the First Minister once approved by Parliament
- Term length: At His Majesty's pleasure
- Deputy: Solicitor General for Scotland
- Salary: £134,092 per annum (2023)
- Website: Lord Advocate at the Scottish Government

His Majesty's Lord Advocate, known as the lord advocate (Scottish Gaelic: Fear-tagraidh), is the most senior law officer in Scotland, and one of the law officers of the Crown, serving as the principal legal adviser of both the Scottish Government and the Crown in Scotland for civil and criminal matters that fall within the devolved powers of the Scottish Parliament. It is the responsibility of the lord advocate to provide all and any legal advice to the Scottish Government on matters relating to government policy, legislation and legal implications of any proposals.

Additionally, the lord advocate serves as the ministerial head of the Crown Office and Procurator Fiscal Service, and as such, is the chief public prosecutor for Scotland with all prosecutions on indictment being conducted by the Crown Office and Procurator Fiscal Service in the lord advocate's name on behalf of the Monarch. Additionally, the lord advocate serves as the head of the systems of prosecutions in Scotland and is responsible for the investigation of all sudden, suspicious, accidental and unexplained deaths which occur within Scotland.

The officeholder is one of the Great Officers of State of Scotland. The current lord advocate is Ruth Charteris, who was nominated by First Minister John Swinney in June 2026. The lord advocate is appointed by the monarch on the recommendation of the incumbent First Minister of Scotland, with the agreement of the Scottish Parliament.

== History ==
=== Origins ===
The office of Advocate to the monarch is an ancient one. The first recorded lord advocate was Sir John Ross of Montgreenan, who is formally mentioned in 1483. At that time the post-holder was generally referred to as the "King's Advocate" and not until the year 1573 was the term "Lord Advocate" first used.

The lord advocate was an ex–officio officer of state in the Kingdom of Scotland, therefore, was entitled to sit within the Parliament of Scotland. In 1725, after the Kingdom of Scotland had relinquished its independence to form the Kingdom of Great Britain, the lord advocate became in effect the only remaining Minister for Scotland within the British Government following the removal of Duke of Roxburghe from the office of Secretary of State for Scotland. Aside from a brief period between 1741 and 1746, the lord advocate was the sole Scottish Minister for this period. Alongside the primary functions of the office as a law officer, the lord advocate became increasingly involved in a wide range of responsibilities at departmental level in relation to all the functions of central government in Scotland, with further responsibilities following later which included the supervision of the police and armed forces in Scotland. In 1824, it was noted that “it has been said advisedly and on the most solemn occasions, that the Lord Advocate is the Privy Council of Scotland, the Grand Jury of Scotland, the Commander in Chief of the Forces of Scotland, the guardian of the whole police of the country and that, in the absence of higher orders, the general management of the business of Government is devolved upon him".

=== Transfer of non–legal functions ===
The Secretary for Scotland Act 1885 created the position of Secretary for Scotland which allowed the transfer of power from the lord advocate to the Secretary of all functions not directly related to Scots law, meaning the office of the lord advocate could return to its original function as being responsible solely for legal issues and law in Scotland. Despite the changes in the responsibilities of the office, the lord advocate remained a minister of the government, with the 1885 highlighting that "nothing in this Act contained shall prejudice or interfere with any rights, powers, privileges, or duties vested in, or imposed upon the lord advocate by virtue of any Act of Parliament or custom". Following the passage of the Secretary for Scotland Act 1885, the lord advocate, for a period, continued to provide some functions relating to the governance of Scotland and did not focus primarily on Scots law as the 1885 Act had tried to ensure. This continued for a period of time as a way of assisting the newly created Scotland Office and position of Secretary for Scotland.

=== 20th century reforms ===
In 1973, some of ministerial functions which related to a more legal nature were transferred to the lord advocate from the secretary of state for Scotland. Functions which were transferred to the lord advocate from the Secretary of State for Scotland included the Scottish Law Commission which was formerly exercised by both the lord advocate and secretary of state for Scotland, as well as functions relating to the Council on Tribunals and its Scottish Committee, certain of which were exercised with the lord chancellor, powers relating to rules regulating procedure in connection with statutory inquiries and proceedings before certain tribunals held in Scotland, and laying before Parliament memoranda in relation to certain statute law consolidation. Additionally, the lord advocate assumed responsibility in a ministerial capacity for some branches of the law which were associated with the administration of justice, including the jurisdiction and procedure of Scottish courts in civil proceedings, the law of evidence and the law relating to prescription and limitation of actions, the law relating to arbitration and the law relating to fatal accident inquiries.

From 1707 to 1998, the lord advocate was the chief legal adviser to the British Government and the Crown on Scottish legal matters, both civil and criminal, until the Scotland Act 1998 devolved most domestic affairs to the Scottish Parliament. His Majesty's Government is now advised on Scots law by the Advocate General for Scotland. The lord advocate is not head of the Faculty of Advocates; that position is held by the dean of the Faculty of Advocates.

=== Devolution ===
Following the passage of the Scotland Act 1998, the lord advocate, together with the Solicitor General for Scotland, were made ministers of the Scottish Government, with a particular focus on advising the government on legal aspects of government policy. The lord advocate retained their status as a law officer of the crown following devolution, with the act highlighting "functions exercisable by the Lord Advocate immediately before he ceased to be a Minister of the Crown on 20 May 1999 continued to be exercisable by him alone following devolution, irrespective of whether they were exercisable within devolved competence or not". Only a limited number of functions relating to reserved areas which were considered best to be held by a Scottish Law Officer in the UK Government were transferred to the newly created post of Advocate General for Scotland.

A number of retained functions remained the direct responsibility of the lord advocate following devolution, which were exercisable by the lord advocate prior to devolution. One principal retained function is the role as head of the systems of criminal prosecution and the investigation of deaths in Scotland on behalf of the Scottish Government, as well as retaining the right to provide legal advice to Scottish Government ministers. Alongside the solicitor general for Scotland, the lord advocate became responsible for having collective responsibility and accountability for the decisions of the Scottish Government, responsibility for all legal advice to the Scottish Government, constitutional function to uphold the rule of law, representing the Scottish Government in civil proceedings, and functions under the Crown Suits (Scotland) Act 1857, of bringing and defending actions on behalf of His Majesty, or the interests of the Crown, including the Scottish Administration.

In addition, the lord advocate has a responsibility of representing the public interest in a range of statutory and common law civil functions, such as serving as a commissioner for the keeping of the Regalia of Scotland, as well as holding ministerial portfolio responsibility for the non-conviction based civil recovery scheme under the Proceeds of Crime Act 2002, and for functions of Ministers in relation to small public trusts.

In September 2026, the Scottish Government announced a review of the role of Lord Advocate and Solicitor General for Scotland.

== Parliamentary and government role ==
=== Cabinet role ===
Until devolution in 1999, all lords advocate were, by convention, members of either the House of Commons or the House of Lords to allow them to speak for the government. Those who were not already members of either house received a life peerage on appointment. Since devolution, the lord advocate and the solicitor general for Scotland are permitted to attend and speak in the Scottish Parliament ex officio, even if they are not Members of the Scottish Parliament. From 1999–2007, the lord advocate attended the weekly Scottish Cabinet meetings. However, after the 2007 election, the new First Minister Alex Salmond decided that lord advocate would no longer attend the Scottish Cabinet, stating he wished to "de-politicise" the post.

The lord advocate attends meetings of the Scottish cabinet on request by government ministers, and is permitted to view all cabinet papers in advance of meetings of the cabinet. If the Scottish cabinet is discussing matters relating to the Crown Office and Procurator Fiscal service, the lord advocate, or the Solicitor General of Scotland, will often be in attendance at cabinet meetings as a representative of the Crown Office and Procurator Fiscal service. Wider accountability of the lord advocate is an important aspect of the role, and whilst not an MSP, the lord advocate is entitled to engage in parliamentary proceedings but is not entitled to vote on legislation proposed by the parliament as they are not an elected incumbent MSP. As such, the lord advocate can be requested by MSPs to appear before the parliament as a form of scrutiny regarding their functions. The Scottish Parliament Standing Orders permits all written questions regarding the operation of the systems of criminal prosecution and investigation of deaths to be answerable to the parliament only by the lord advocate or the solicitor general of Scotland.

Appointments as senators of the College of Justice were formerly made on the nomination of the lord advocate. Every lord advocate between 1842 and 1967 was later appointed to the bench, either on demitting office or at a later date. Many lord advocates in fact nominated themselves for appointment as lord president of the Court of Session or as lord justice clerk.

=== Legal functions ===
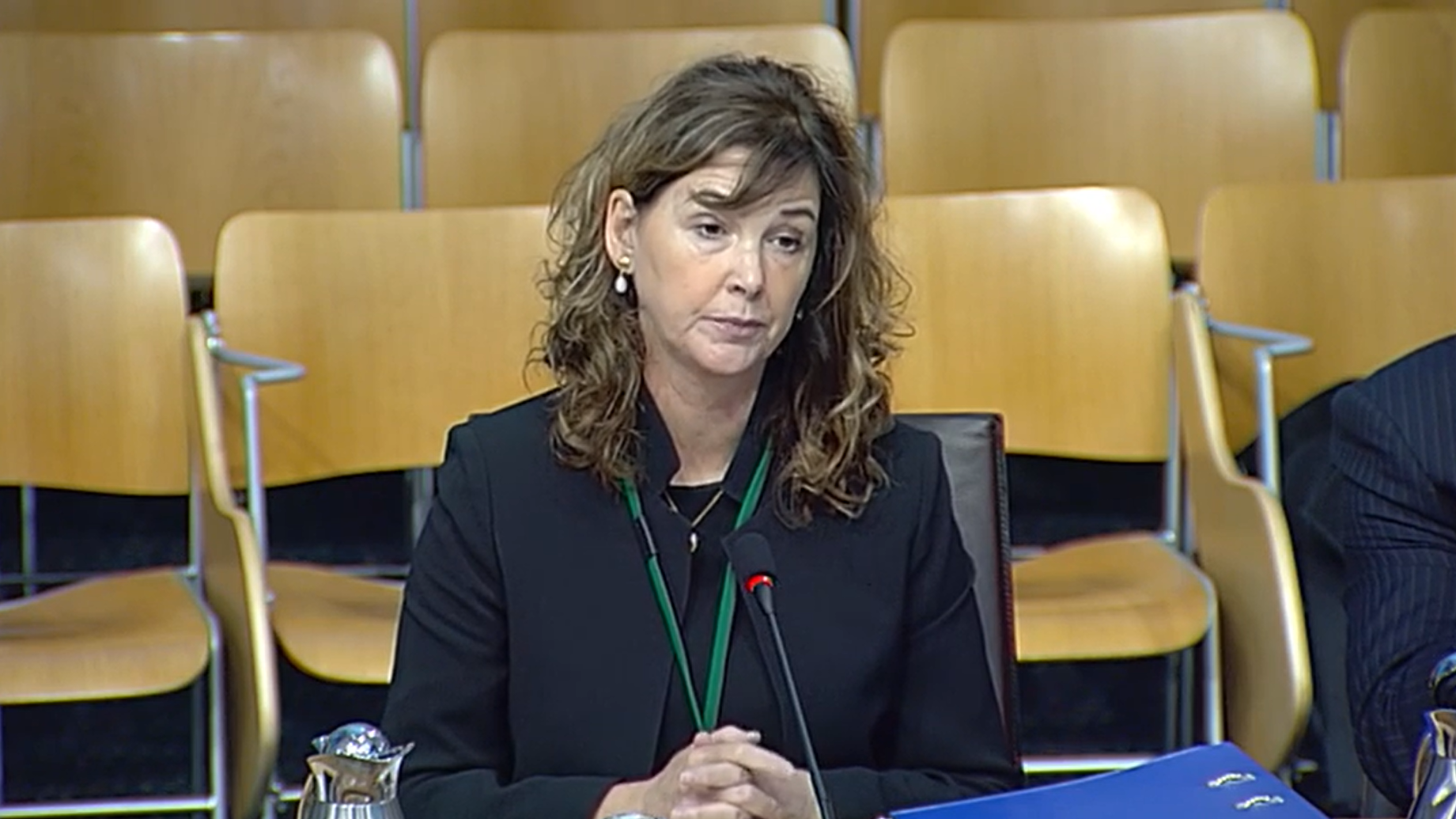
Dorothy Bain, lord advocate from 2021 to 2026, appearing before the Scottish Parliament Justice Committee in 2018

The lord advocate is the principal legal adviser to the Scottish Government, and is responsible for advising the government on legislative competence of Scottish legislation, general legal issues as well as having responsibility for the provision of legal advice to the Scottish Government. The lord advocate also has the responsibility of providing legal advice to Scottish Government Directorates and the Parliamentary Counsel Office who are responsible for drafting the legislative programme of the Scottish Government.

The lord advocate is a member of the Cabinet Sub-Committee on Legislation and has an oversight on the drafting of government bills by Parliamentary Counsel in Parliamentary Counsel Office. Prior to a bill being presented to the Scottish Parliament, the proposing minister must state that it either is or is not within the legislative competence of the Scottish Parliament, with the lord advocate and Solicitor General of Scotland being ultimately responsible on making a final decision as to whether the proposed bill is or is not within the parliaments legislative competence. The lord advocate may refer a Bill to the Supreme Court within the four week period after it is passed by the Parliament, for a final decision as to whether any proposed bill, or any of its provisions, are outside legislative competence of the Scottish Parliament.

The selection of counsel is the responsibility for the lord advocate, who approves a list of junior counsel (Standing Junior Counsel) who may be instructed by SGLD in litigation involving the Scottish Government. In cases where that is considered appropriate senior counsel will also be instructed. The approval of the lord advocate is sought in relation to the appointment of senior counsel for a particular piece of litigation, and on occasion, one of the Law Officers will be present in court in order to represent the Scottish Ministers.

=== Crown Office ===
The Crown Office and Procurator Fiscal Service is headed by the lord advocate and the solicitor general for Scotland, and is the public prosecution service in Scotland. It also carries out functions which are broadly equivalent to the coroner in common law jurisdictions. Incorporated within the Crown Office is the legal secretariat to the lord advocate. The crown agent is the principal legal adviser to the lord advocate on prosecution matters. He or she also acts as chief executive for the department and as solicitor in all legal proceedings in which the lord advocate appears as representing his or her own department.

They issue general instructions for the guidance of Crown counsel, procurators fiscal, sheriff clerks and other public officials; transmit instructions from Crown counsel to procurators fiscal about prosecutions; and in consultation with the Clerk of Justiciary, arrange sittings of the High Court of Justiciary. At trials in the High Court in Edinburgh, they attend as instructing solicitor. They are assisted by other senior legal, managerial and administrative staff. The Crown Agent also holds the office of king's and lord treasurer's remembrancer. The lord advocate is one of the commissioners for the keeping of the Regalia of Scotland.

== Calls for reform ==
In the Greshornish House Accord of 16 September 2008, Professors Hans Köchler and Robert Black said—

It is inappropriate that the Chief Legal Adviser to the Government is also head of all criminal prosecutions. Whilst the Lord Advocate and Solicitor General continue as public prosecutors the principle of separation of powers seems compromised. The potential for a conflict of interest always exists. Resolution of these circumstances would entail an amendment of the provisions contained within the Scotland Act 1998.

The judges of Scotland's highest court came to share this view. In a submission to the commission set up to consider how the devolution settlement between Scotland and the United Kingdom could be improved, the judges recommended that the lord advocate should cease to be the head of the public prosecution system and should act only as the Scottish Government's chief legal adviser. They noted various ways in which the lord advocate's roles had caused problems for the judicial system, including the ability "to challenge... virtually any act of a prosecutor has led to a plethora of disputed issues, with consequential delays to the holding of trials and to the hearing and completion of appeals against conviction." The judges proposed three alternative solutions: stripping the lord advocate of responsibility for prosecutions, exempting the lord advocate from compliance with the European Convention on Human Rights, or changing the law on criminal appeals. While not specifically favouring any of the three, they noted that the third proposal was radical enough to "generate considerable controversy".

== List of lords advocate ==
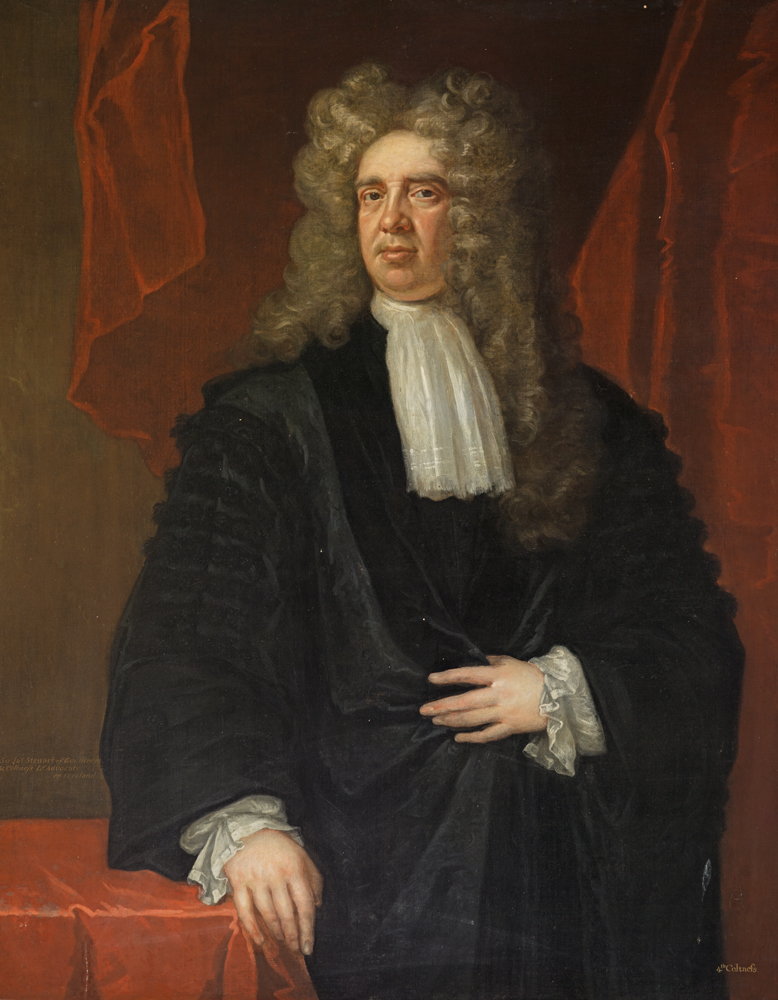
Sir James Stewart, lord advocate 1692–1707, the last lord advocate of the Kingdom of Scotland prior to the Acts of Union

=== Pre-Union ===
- June 1478 (or earlier) – May 1485 or 1494: John Ross of Montgrenan
- Mar 1491 – Feb 1493: David Balfour of Carraldstoun
- Jun 1494 – Sep 1513: James Henryson of Fordell
- 1503–1521?: Richard Lawson of Heirigs (jointly with Henryson?)
- Oct 1513 – Nov 1524: James Wishart of Pittarrow
- Dec 1524 – 1527: Adam Otterburn of Auldhame and Reidhall
- 1527–1532: Adam Otterburn and John Foulis of Colinton (jointly)
- 1533–1538: Adam Otterburn and Henry Lauder of St. Germains (jointly)
- Sep 1538–1555: Henry Lauder of St. Germains
- Oct 1555-1559: Henry Lauder and John Spens of Condie (jointly)
- before Feb 1560-1573: John Spens of Condie and Robert Crichton of Eliok (jointly)
- Oct 1573-1581 Robert Crichton of Eliok and David Borthwick of Lochhill (jointly)
- Jun 1582–1589: David Macgill of Cranston-Riddell, and Nisbet
- Aug 1589 – Sep 1594: David MacGill and John Skene of Curriehill (jointly)
- Oct 1594 - 1596 : David MacGill and William Hart of Livielands (jointly)
- Jan 1596 - 1597: William Hart of Livielands and Sir Thomas Hamilton of Drumcairnie (jointly)
- 1597-May 1612 Sir Thomas Hamilton of Drumcairnie
- Jun 1612 – May 1626: Sir William Oliphant of Newton
- May 1626 - Apr 1628: Sir William Oliphant and Sir Thomas Hope of Craighall (jointly)
- Apr 1628– Oct 1646: Sir Thomas Hope, 1st Baronet of Craighall
- Oct 1646– Mar 1649: Sir Archibald Johnston of Warriston
- Mar, 1649 - Aug 1651: Sir Thomas Nicholson
- vacant (from Aug 1651).
- 1659–1661: Sir Archibald Primrose
- 1661–1664: Sir John Fletcher
- 1664–1677: Sir John Nisbet
- 1677–1687: Sir George Mackenzie of Rosehaugh
- 1687–1688: Sir John Dalrymple
- 1688–1689: Sir George Mackenzie of Rosehaugh
- 1689–1692: John Dalrymple
- 1692–1707: Sir James Stewart

=== Post-Union ===
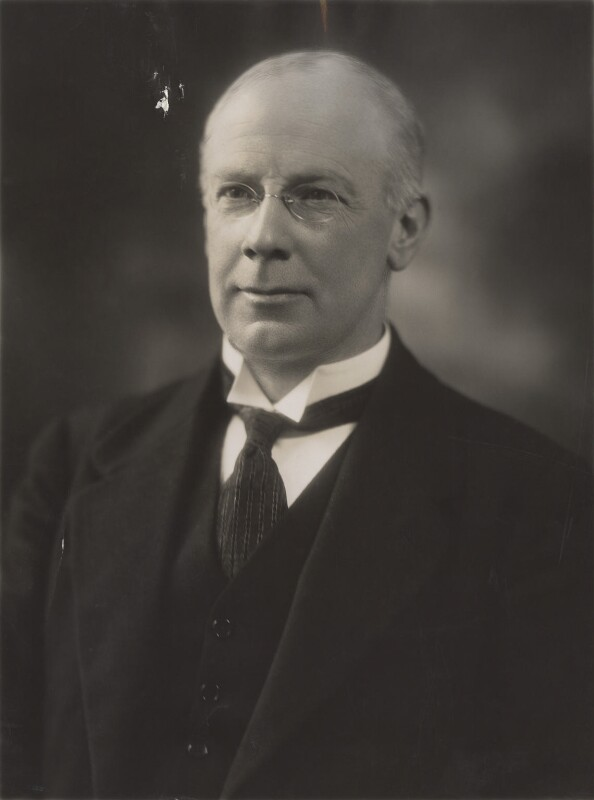
Alexander MacRobert, Lord Advocate between May–June 1929

- 1707–1709: Sir James Stewart
- 1709–1711: Sir David Dalrymple, 1st Baronet
- 1711–1713: Sir James Stewart (second time)
- 1714: Thomas Kennedy of Dunure
- 1714–1720: Sir David Dalrymple, 1st Baronet
- 1720–1725: Robert Dundas the elder
- 1725–1737: Duncan Forbes
- 1737–1742: Charles Erskine
- 1742–1746: Robert Craigie
- 1746–1754: William Grant
- 1754–1760: Robert Dundas the younger
- 1760–1766: Thomas Miller
- 1766–1775: James Montgomery
- 1775–1783: Henry Dundas
- 1783: Henry Erskine
- 1783–1789: Ilay Campbell
- 1789–1801: Robert Dundas
- 1801–1804: Charles Hope
- 1804–1806: Sir James Montgomery, 2nd Baronet
- 1806–1807: Henry Erskine
- 1807–1816: Archibald Colquhoun
- 1816–1819: Alexander Maconochie
- 1819–1830: Sir William Rae, 3rd Baronet
- December 1830 – May 1834: Francis Jeffrey
- May – November 1834: John Murray
- December 1834 – April 1835: Sir William Rae, 3rd Baronet
- April 1835 – April 1839: John Murray
- April 1839 – September 1841: Andrew Rutherfurd
- September 1841 – October 1842: Sir William Rae, 3rd Baronet
- October 1842 – July 1846: Duncan McNeill
- July 1846 – April 1851: Andrew Rutherfurd
- April 1851 – February 1852: James Moncreiff
- February – May 1852: Adam Anderson
- May – December 1852: John Inglis
- December 1852 – March 1858: James Moncreiff
- March – July 1858: John Inglis
- July 1858 – April 1859: Charles Baillie
- April – June 1859: David Mure
- June 1859 – July 1866: James Moncreiff
- July 1866 – February 1867: George Patton
- February 1867 – December 1868: Edward Gordon
- December 1868 – October 1869: James Moncreiff
- October 1869 – February 1874: George Young
- 1874–1876: Edward Gordon
- July 1876 – April 1880: William Watson
- May 1880 – August 1881: John McLaren
- August 1881 – July 1885: John Blair Balfour
- July 1885 – February 1886: John Macdonald
- February – August 1886: John Blair Balfour
- August 1886 – October 1888: John Macdonald
- October 1888 – August 1891: James Robertson
- October 1891 – August 1892: Sir Charles Pearson
- August 1892 – July 1895: John Balfour
- July 1895 – May 1896: Sir Charles Pearson
- May 1896 – October 1903: Andrew Murray
- October 1903 – December 1905: Charles Dickson
- December 1905 – February 1909: Thomas Shaw
- February 1909 – October 1913: Alexander Ure
- October 1913 – December 1916: Robert Munro
- December 1916 – 1920: James Clyde
- 1920–1922: Thomas Brash Morison
- March 1922 – November 1922: Charles David Murray
- November 1922 – February 1924: William Watson
- February 1924 – November 1924: Hugh Pattison MacMillan
- November 1924 – May 1929: William Watson
- May 1929 – June 1929: Alexander Munro MacRobert
- June 1929 – 1933: Craigie Aitchison
- 1933–1935: Wilfrid Normand
- April 1935 – October 1935: Douglas Jamieson
- 1935–1941: Thomas Cooper
- 1941–1945: James Scott Cumberland Reid
- 1945–1947: George Thomson
- 1947–1951: John Wheatley
- 1951–1955: James Clyde
- 1955–1960: William Rankine Milligan
- 1960–1962: William Grant
- 1962–1964: Ian Shearer
- 1964–1967: George Stott
- 1967–1970: Henry Wilson
- 1970–1974: Norman Wylie
- 1974–1979: Ronald Murray
- 1979–1984: James Mackay, Baron Mackay of Clashfern
- 1984–1989: Kenneth Cameron, Baron Cameron of Lochbroom
- 1989–1992: Peter Fraser, Baron Fraser of Carmyllie
- 1992–1995: Alan Rodger, Baron Rodger of Earlsferry
- 1995–1997: Donald Mackay, Baron Mackay of Drumadoon

=== Post-Devolution ===
Lord Advocate	Term	First Minister	Solicitor General
Andrew Hardie	1997–2000	Donald Dewar	Colin Boyd
Colin Boyd	2000–2006	Donald Dewar	Neil Davidson
Colin Boyd	2000–2006	Henry McLeish	Neil Davidson
Colin Boyd	2000–2006	Jack McConnell	Elish Angiolini
Elish Angiolini	2006–2011	Jack McConnell	John Beckett
Elish Angiolini	2006–2011	Jack McConnell	Frank Muholland
Elish Angiolini	2006–2011	Alex Salmond	Frank Muholland
Frank Muholland	2011–2016	Alex Salmond	Lesley Thomson
James Wolffe	2016–2021	Nicola Sturgeon	Alison Di Rollo
Dorothy Bain	2021–2026	Nicola Sturgeon	Ruth Charteris
Dorothy Bain	2021–2026	Humza Yousaf	Ruth Charteris
Dorothy Bain	2021–2026	John Swinney	Ruth Charteris
Ruth Charteris	2026–present	John Swinney	Brian Gill

== See also ==
- Lord Advocate's Reference
- Law Officers of the Crown
- Attorney General for England and Wales
- Attorney General for Northern Ireland

== Sources ==
The career path of recent Scottish law officers, Scots Law Times, 14 July 2006
