= All Saints' Church, Harewood =

Coordinates: 53.9003°N 1.5240°W

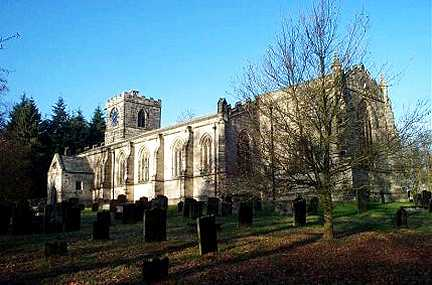
- All Saints' Church, Harewood, from the southeast

- Location in West Yorkshire
- OS grid reference: SE 313 450
- Location: Harewood, West Yorkshire
- Country: England
- Denomination: Anglican
- Website: Churches Conservation Trust

Architecture
- Functional status: Redundant
- Heritage designation: Grade I
- Designated: 30 March 1966
- Architect: Sir George Gilbert Scott (restoration)
- Architectural type: Church
- Style: Gothic
- Groundbreaking: c. 1410

Specifications
- Materials: Millstone grit, Westmorland slate roofs

All Saints' Church is a 15th-century redundant church in the park of Harewood House, the seat of the Lascelles Earls of Harewood, near the village of Harewood, West Yorkshire, England.

The building is recorded in the National Heritage List for England as a designated Grade I listed building, and is under the care of the Churches Conservation Trust.

The church stands in isolation within Harewood Park, as the surrounding village was relocated by the owner of Harewood House, in about 1760, to a location further from the house.

Inside the church is the family vault of the Earls of Harewood and a set of six alabaster monuments, which are "the largest collection of alabaster monuments in a parish church within the dates 1419–1510".

== History ==
The present church was built in about 1410 by Elizabeth and Sybil, the daughters of William de Aldburgh of the nearby Harewood Castle, and was originally dedicated to the Holy Cross. It was not the first church on the site. There is a record of a priest here in the 10th century, and some carving from this period has survived. Excavation in 1981 uncovered ninth-century stonework and an eleventh-century cross shaft from earlier burials prior to the Norman Conquest. An inscription on a beam discovered when the roof was replaced in the 18th Century reads "We adore and praise thee thou holy Jesus, because thou hast redeemed us by thy Holy Cross, 1116". In 1739 the estate was acquired by the Lascelles family, who in later generations became the Earls of Harewood, and in 1759 they began the building of Harewood House. In the early 1780s the family added battlements and pinnacles to the church. It was restored in 1862–63 by Sir George Gilbert Scott. The restoration included replacement of the ceiling, the pews and the stained glass, and adding a new altar, lectern, pulpit and font. By 1978 the effigies on the alabaster monuments were deteriorating and when the church was taken into the care of the Churches Conservation Trust they were restored and repairs were carried out to the fabric of the church. All Saints was declared redundant on 1 November 1977, and was vested in the Trust on 24 October 1978.

== Ministers ==
The last Vicar of Harewood was Canon H. H. Griffiths, who served from 1928 to 1974 and died "suddenly and unexpectedly" on 3 July 1974. It was following his death that the church was declared redundant.

== Architecture ==
=== Structure ===
The church is constructed in Millstone Grit, quarried locally, and its roofs are in Westmorland slate. Its plan consists of a four-bay nave with north and south aisles and a south porch, a chancel with a north vestry, and a west tower. At the eastern ends of the aisles are chantry chapels, the Gascoigne chapel on the south and the Redman chapel on the north. Its architectural style is Perpendicular. Around the church are diagonal buttresses. The tower is squat, in two stages, and is embraced by the aisles. The west doorway is arched and over it is a five-light window. The upper stage of the tower contains two-light bell openings in each side with a clock on the south face, and the top is embattled. Over the doorway in the porch is a sundial, and the date 1775 is engraved in the apex of its gable. In the aisles are three-light windows, and the east window has five lights. The buttresses at the east end are surmounted by crocketted pinnacles.

=== Fittings and furniture ===
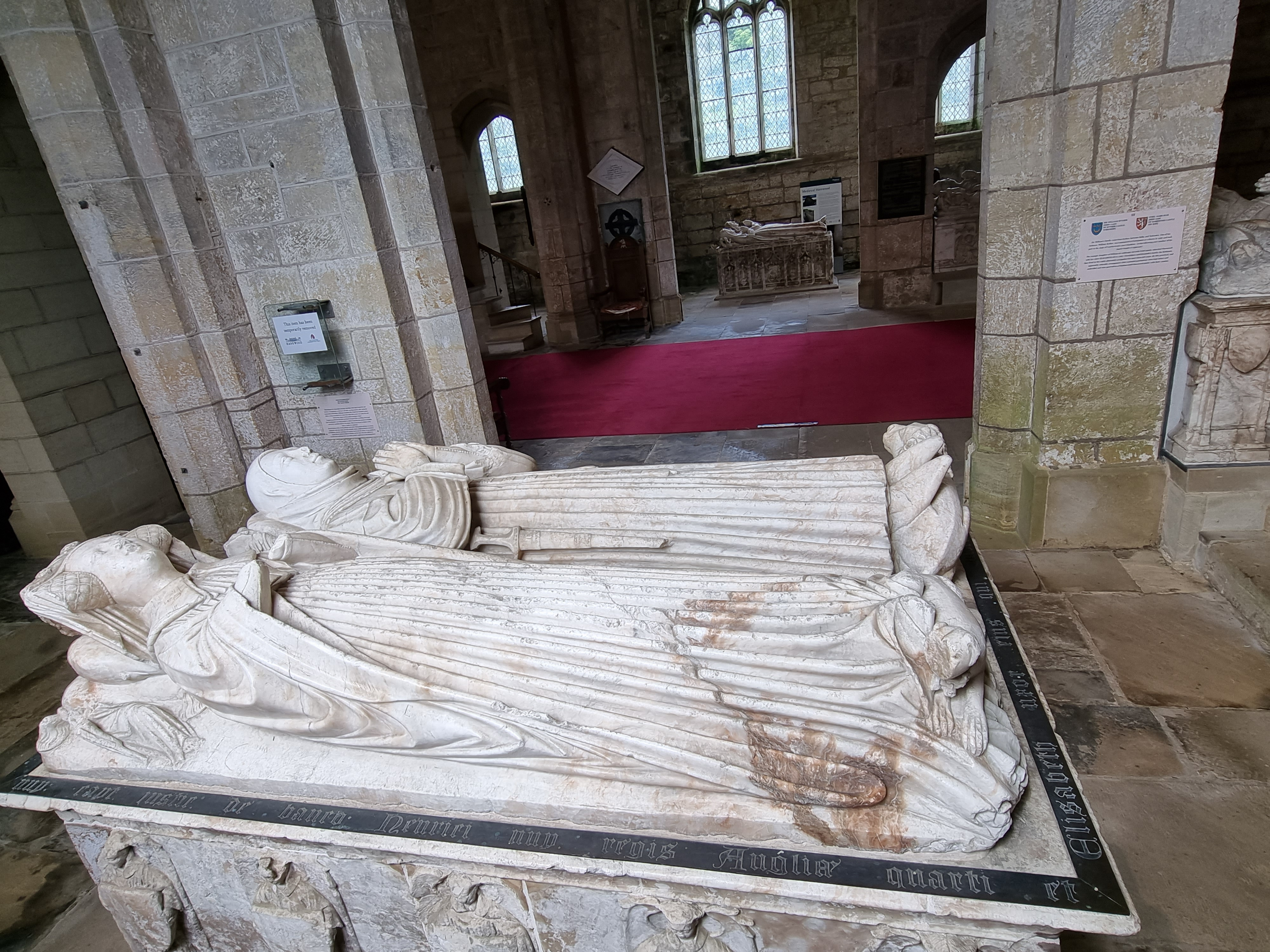
The 15th century alabaster tomb of Sir William Gascoigne and his wife Elizabeth Mowbray.

The set of alabaster monuments are described as being "the glory of the church"; they consist of the effigies of six recumbent couples lying on tomb chests, and all depict members of families connected with the Harewood estate. All the monuments were originally brightly coloured, but the colour has been lost, leaving the white alabaster. A major programme of conservation was carried out in 1978 when they were dismantled and reerected as close as possible to their original locations. On the sides of the tombs are depictions of angels, saints and mourners. The oldest tomb, in the south chapel, is that of Sir William Gascoigne, Lord Chief Justice and his wife Elizabeth; it dates from about 1419. Sir William is dressed in his robes and he carries a purse and a dagger. The later tombs display a greater sophistication in their carving, and they reflect the fashions of the day. The latest effigies are of Edward Redman (Redmayn) and his wife Elizabeth Huddleston, dating from about 1510; the depiction of Edward Redman is said to be a true-to-life portrait, a rarity at the time it was carved.

In the chancel is a wall memorial to Sir Thomas Denison who died in 1765. The church contains two fonts; one is Norman and the other dates from the Victorian era. The octagonal pulpit dates from the 19th century and contains marble columns and carved stone panels. The altar rails and gates are a memorial to George V and include the insignia of the Order of the British Empire, Order of the Garter, Order of the Thistle and Order of St Patrick. The latest memorial in the church is on the north wall; it is to the memory of the 6th Earl of Harewood and his wife, Mary, Princess Royal. The stained glass in the west window is from the studio of Charles Eamer Kempe.

== See also ==
- Grade I listed buildings in West Yorkshire
- Grade I listed churches in West Yorkshire
- Listed buildings in Harewood, West Yorkshire
- List of churches preserved by the Churches Conservation Trust in Northern England
