= Sheriff of Haddington =

The Sheriff of Haddington, or Sheriff of East Lothian, was historically the royal official responsible for enforcing law and order in Haddington, Scotland. Prior to 1748 most sheriffdoms were held on a hereditary basis. From that date, following the Jacobite uprising of 1745, the hereditary sheriffs were replaced by salaried sheriff-deputes, qualified advocates who were members of the Scottish Bar.

The sheriffdom of Haddington was created in the 12th century. Following mergers of the Scottish sheriffdoms in 1856 the position was retitled Sheriff of Haddington & Berwick. The sheriffdom was divided in 1872 and merged into the sheriffdoms of Midlothian & Haddington and Roxburgh, Berwick & Selkirk.

== Sheriffs of Haddington ==
- Durward (1124)
- Alexander de St Martin (1184)
- Roger de Mowbray (1263)
- William St. Clair (1264-1265)
- Walter de Huntercombe (1296)
- Ivo de Aldeburgh (1305)
- William Livingstone (1339)
- James Cockburn of Newbigging (1470)
- Alexander Hepburn (1482)
- Patrick Hepburn, 1st Earl of Bothwell (1489)
- Adam Hepburn, 2nd Earl of Bothwell (1508)
- Francis Stewart, 5th Earl of Bothwell (1584)

Sheriffs-Depute (Sheriff Principle)

- John Hay of Baro (1663–)
- Patrick Brown (1670–)
- George Hayburton (1681–)
- Sir John Ramsey (1683–)
- John Sinclair (1690–)
- John Veitch (1692–)
- William Baillie (1695–)
- Alexander Hay (1697–)
- John Hay of Hopes (1714–)
- Charles Brown of Colstoun (1715–)
- Thomas Menzies (1718–)
- John Hamilton (1725–)
- Hon James Hamilton (1736–)
- David Kinloch (1744–)

Sheriffs-Depute (Crown)

- Hon James Hamilton of Frierland, 1747–1762
- William Law, 1762–1803
- John Burnett, 1803-1810
- Alexander Maconochie, Lord Meadowbank, 1810–1813
- William Home, 1813–1856

== Sheriffs of Haddington and Berwick (1856) ==
- Robert Bell, 1856–?1860
- George Young, 1860–1862
- Andrew Rutherford-Clark, 1862–1869
- Alexander Burns Shand, 1869–1872
- 1872 The sheriffdom was divided and merged in the sheriffdoms of Midlothian and Haddington and Roxburgh, Berwick & Selkirk.

== See also ==
- Historical development of Scottish sheriffdoms
