= Sheriff of Edinburgh =

The Sheriff of Edinburgh was historically the royal official responsible for enforcing law and order and bringing criminals to justice in the shire of Edinburgh (also known as Edinburghshire or Midlothian) in Scotland. In 1482 the burgh of Edinburgh itself was given the right to appoint its own sheriff, and thereafter the sheriff of Edinburgh's authority applied in the area of Midlothian outside the city, whilst still being called the sheriff of Edinburgh. Prior to 1748 most sheriffdoms were held on a hereditary basis. From that date, following the Jacobite uprising of 1745, they were replaced by salaried sheriff-deputes, qualified advocates who were members of the Scottish Bar.

In 1872, following mergers, the sheriffdom became known as the sheriffdom of Midlothian and Haddington After further reorganisations it became part of the sheriffdoms of The Lothians in 1881 and The Lothians and Peebles in 1883.

== Sheriffs of Edinburgh ==
- Norman (1143–1147)
- Geoffrey de Melville (1153)
- Robert (1162–1165)
- Henry de Brade (1165–1214)
- Michael Fleming (1198 -1210)
- Thomas de Lastalrie (1210)
- John de Vallibus (1214–1249)
- John de Graham (1225)
- Roger de Mowbray (1263)
- William St. Clair (1264-1265)
- William St. Clair (1288-1290)
- Hugh de Lowther (1292-1296)
- Walter de Huntercombe (1296)
- John de Kingston (1300)
- Ebulo IV de Montibus (1303)
- Ivo de Aldeburgh (1305)
- Piers de Lombard (1313)
- Robert de Menzies (1328)
- John de Kingston (1334)
- John de Strivelyn (1335)
- Laurence Preston (1337)
- Gilbert Fouler (1358)
- William Ramsay
- Archibald Douglas, Earl of Douglas (1360(?)-1364) Exact date of appointment in doubt
- Robert de Dalyell (1366)
- Simon de Preston (1367)
- Thomas de Erskyne (1371)
- Malcolm Fleming of Biggar (1374)
- John Lyon of Glamis (1380)
- Malcolm Fleming of Biggar (1381)
- Adam Forrester (1382)
- Malcolm Fleming of Biggar (1388)
- William Lindsay (1390–1406)
- Henry Preston (1435)
- William de Crechtoun (1438)
- John Logan (1444)
- John Haldane (1460)
- Alexander Hepburn (1482)
- Patrick Hepburn, Earl of Bothwell (1488-1508)
- Adam Hepburn, Earl of Bothwell (1508-1513)
- Patrick Hepburn, Earl of Bothwell (1513–?1556)
- Francis Stewart, 5th Earl of Bothwell (at 1584)
- William Seton of Kylesmure (1616)
- George Gordon, 1st Earl of Aberdeen (1682–1684)
- James Drummond, 4th Earl of Perth (1684–1689)
- No appointment (1689–1710)
- William Ramsay, 5th Earl of Dalhousie (1703–1710)
- Charles Maitland, 6th Earl of Lauderdale (1718–1744)
- James Maitland, 7th Earl of Lauderdale (1744–1748)
- Charles Maitland of Pittrichie, 1748 sheriff depute
- Hon Walter Sandilands, 8th Lord Torpichen, 1748– sheriff depute
- Archibald Cockburn, 1765–1790
- John Pringle, 1790–1793
- James Clerk, 1793–1809
- William Rae, 1809–1819
- Adam Duff, 1819–1840
- Robert Cunningham Graham Spiers, 1840–1847
- John Thomson Gordon, 1848–1865
- Archibald Davidson of Slateford, 1865 –>1886

== Sheriffs of Midlothian and Haddington (1872) ==
- For sheriffs after 1881 see the Sheriff of the Lothians and Peebles

== See also ==
- Historical development of Scottish sheriffdoms
