= Piers de Lombard =

Gascon or Lombard knight

Piers de Lombard (Note: Also Petri Lubaud, Petrus Labaud, Peter Leland, Peter Lubart) was either a Gascon or Lombard knight who served in the Scottish War of Independence.

== Life ==
He was appointed by Edward I of England as Sheriff of Edinburgh and was Governor of Edinburgh Castle, succeeding John de Kingston.

He was also Governor of Linlithgow Pele. He later entered the service of Robert the Bruce after being placed in the dungeons of Edinburgh castle by the English garrison and released by the Scottish who retook the castle under Thomas Randolph, 1st Earl of Moray. His estate of Cowden, Midlothian was forfeited in 1316.

For having changed sides, Piers was later executed by the Scottish under orders from Robert the Bruce for being a traitor with "an English heart".
