= Grade I listed buildings in West Yorkshire =

West Yorkshire shown within England

There are over 9,000 Grade I listed buildings in England. This page is a list of these buildings in the county of West Yorkshire, by metropolitan district.

== Bradford ==
Name	Location	Type	Completed (Note: The date given is the date used by Historic England as significant for the initial building or that of an important part in the structure's description.)	Date designated	Grid ref. (Note: The grid reference is based on the British national grid reference system, sometimes known as OSGB36, used by the Ordnance Survey.) Geo-coordinates	Entry number (Note: The "List Entry Number" is a unique number assigned to each listed building and scheduled monument by Historic England.)	Image
Heathcote	Ilkley	House	1906–08	12 December 2014	SE1085747608; 53°55′28″N 1°50′10″W	1133518	Heathcote More images
2 Pairs of Gate Piers and Linking Walls with Summer-house Attached to Rear of Farfield Hall	Addingham, Ilkley	Gate Pier	Early 18th century	10 September 1954	SE0773651653; 53°57′39″N 1°53′01″W	1133451	Upload Photo
Church of St Peter	Addingham, Ilkley	Cross	Anglo-Saxon	10 September 1954	SE0852249696; 53°56′36″N 1°52′18″W	1133457	Church of St Peter More images
Farfield Hall	Addingham, Ilkley	Kitchen	16th century or 17th century	10 September 1954	SE0773951619; 53°57′38″N 1°53′01″W	1133450	Farfield Hall More images
Bingley Five Rise Locks with Overflow Channel	Bingley	Steps	c. 1773	9 August 1966	SE1075839959; 53°51′21″N 1°50′17″W	1314303	Bingley Five Rise Locks with Overflow Channel More images
Burley House	Burley in Wharfedale, Ilkley	Country House	Late 18th century	18 July 1949	SE1702746105; 53°54′39″N 1°44′32″W	1199636	Burley House More images
Haworth Parsonage (Brontë Museum)	Haworth	Vicarage	1779	23 February 1955	SE0290937214; 53°49′52″N 1°57′26″W	1313933	Haworth Parsonage (Brontë Museum) More images
3 Stone Crosses previously south of the Church of All Saints, now inside	Ilkley	Cross	Early C9	20 May 1976	SE1164847813; 53°55′35″N 1°49′27″W	1133507	3 Stone Crosses previously south of the Church of All Saints, now inside More images
Manor House	Ilkley	House	Earlier than 16th century	18 July 1949	SE1160647869; 53°55′37″N 1°49′29″W	1133505	Manor House More images
Myddelton Lodge (St Paul's Retreat)	Ilkley	Detached House	16th century	18 July 1949	SE1099549064; 53°56′15″N 1°50′02″W	1133521	Myddelton Lodge (St Paul's Retreat) More images
East Riddlesden Hall	Riddlesden, Keighley	House	Pre 1640	23 February 1955	SE0789342064; 53°52′29″N 1°52′53″W	1283478	East Riddlesden Hall More images
West Riddlesden Hall	Riddlesden, Keighley	House	1687	23 February 1955	SE0727042690; 53°52′49″N 1°53′27″W	1313939	Upload Photo
Bolling Hall (museum)	Bowling	Hall House	14th century Probably	4 September 1952	SE1730631431; 53°46′44″N 1°44′20″W	1299398	Bolling Hall (museum) More images
Bradford City Hall	Bradford city centre	Town Hall	1869-1873	14 June 1963	SE1635132912; 53°47′32″N 1°45′12″W	1133675	Bradford City Hall More images
Cathedral Church of St Peter	Bradford city centre	Cathedral	1919	4 September 1952	SE1671533264; 53°47′44″N 1°44′52″W	1133250	Cathedral Church of St Peter More images
The Wool Exchange	Bradford city centre	Wool Exchange	1864 to 1867	14 June 1963	SE1640233128; 53°47′39″N 1°45′09″W	1132985	The Wool Exchange More images
Congregational Church (including Salt Family Mausoleum to South)	Saltaire, Shipley	Bust	1858-9	22 November 1966	SE1385838107; 53°50′21″N 1°47′27″W	1314229	Congregational Church (including Salt Family Mausoleum to South) More images
Upper Headley Hall	Thornton	House	1589	4 September 1952	SE0978532157; 53°47′08″N 1°51′11″W	1111890	Upper Headley Hall More images
Courtyard Entrance and Walling at Upper Headley Hall	Thornton	Gate	Dated 1669	4 September 1952	SE0979032141; 53°47′08″N 1°51′10″W	1133129	Courtyard Entrance and Walling at Upper Headley Hall
Barn at Upper Headley Hall	Thornton	Barn	Late 16th century or early 17th century	4 September 1952	SE0976332171; 53°47′09″N 1°51′12″W	1133130	Upload Photo
Tong Hall	Tong	House	C15/C16	4 September 1952	SE2180930710; 53°46′20″N 1°40′14″W	1314140	Tong Hall More images
Church of St James	Tong	Church	Medieval	4 September 1952	SE2191730542; 53°46′15″N 1°40′08″W	1133660	Church of St James More images

== Calderdale ==
Name	Location	Type	Completed	Date designated	Grid ref. Geo-coordinates	Entry number	Image
Barkisland Hall	Barkisland, Ripponden	House	1638	15 August 1966	SE0607019934; 53°40′33″N 1°54′35″W	1276881	Barkisland Hall More images
The Howroyde	Barkisland, Ripponden	House	Mid 18th century	15 August 1966	SE0583719470; 53°40′18″N 1°54′47″W	1277316	The Howroyde More images
The Unitarian Church	Todmorden	Unitarian Chapel	1865-1869	22 November 1966	SD9356423861; 53°42′40″N 2°05′56″W	1228988	The Unitarian Church More images
Todmorden Town Hall	Todmorden	Court House	Early 1860s	22 November 1966	SD9366524167; 53°42′50″N 2°05′51″W	1228980	Todmorden Town Hall More images
Church of All Souls	Boothtown, Halifax	Church	1856	3 November 1954	SE0915326022; 53°43′50″N 1°51′46″W	1314027	Church of All Souls More images
Church of St John the Baptist	Halifax	Church	12th-century origins	3 November 1954	SE0974525209; 53°43′24″N 1°51′14″W	1133928	Church of St John the Baptist More images
Church of St Mary	Elland	Gate	19th century	24 January 1968	SE1080521159; 53°41′12″N 1°50′16″W	1184393	Church of St Mary More images
Church of St Peter	Sowerby	Church	Earlier	15 November 1966	SE0428823201; 53°42′19″N 1°56′11″W	1313775	Church of St Peter More images
Double Aisled Barn to North West of Kirklees Priory Gatehouse	Kirklees Park	Barn	15th century	3 January 1967	SE1742722122; 53°41′43″N 1°44′15″W	1133848	Double Aisled Barn to North West of Kirklees Priory Gatehouse
Home Farm Building Number 9 Malthouse	Kirklees Park	Malt House	Late 17th century	3 January 1967	SE1732722246; 53°41′47″N 1°44′21″W	1133809	Home Farm Building Number 9 Malthouse More images
Kirklees Hall Mansion and Attached Stables	Kirklees Park	Country House	Mid 16th century	3 January 1967	SE1703422237; 53°41′47″N 1°44′37″W	1184034	Kirklees Hall Mansion and Attached Stables More images
Kershaw House	Luddenden Foot	Cross Wing House/Restaurant	Early-Mid 17th century	15 November 1966	SE0398425462; 53°43′32″N 1°56′28″W	1184572	Kershaw House More images
New Hall	Elland	House	17th century	24 January 1968	SE1190920974; 53°41′06″N 1°49′16″W	1313979	New Hall More images
Piece Hall	Halifax town centre	Market Hall	Converted 1868	3 November 1954	SE0955925077; 53°43′19″N 1°51′24″W	1273056	Piece Hall More images
High Bentley	Shelf	House	17th century	1 November 1956	SE1312728517; 53°45′10″N 1°48′09″W	1133765	Upload Photo
Wood Lane Hall	Sowerby	House	1649	19 July 1988	SE0433723651; 53°42′33″N 1°56′09″W	1134490	Wood Lane Hall More images

== Kirklees ==
Name	Location	Type	Completed	Date designated	Grid ref. Geo-coordinates	Entry number	Image
Church of St Michael	Emley	Church	Early Medieval	29 March 1965	SE2449413320; 53°36′57″N 1°37′52″W	1135290	Church of St Michael More images
Church of All Hallows	Kirkburton	Church	c. 1200	23 June 1965	SE1980212497; 53°36′31″N 1°42′08″W	1313318	Church of All Hallows More images
Woodsome Hall	Fenay Bridge, Huddersfield	House	?	23 June 1965	SE1802614414; 53°37′33″N 1°43′44″W	1184158	Woodsome Hall More images
Banney Royd	Edgerton, Huddersfield	House	1900-1	29 September 1978	SE1260018100; 53°39′33″N 1°48′39″W	1134184	Upload Photo
Church of All Hallows	Almondbury	Church	13th century	3 March 1952	SE1683315058; 53°37′54″N 1°44′49″W	1225096	Church of All Hallows More images
Church of All Saints	Batley	Church	13th century	29 March 1963	SE2413024457; 53°42′58″N 1°38′09″W	1134620	Church of All Saints More images
Church of St Michael and All Angels	Thornhill	Church	15th century	30 June 1949	SE2533718862; 53°39′56″N 1°37′05″W	1200754	Church of St Michael and All Angels More images
Oakwell Hall Including Boundary Wall	Birstall	Hall House	1583	29 March 1963	SE2174627114; 53°44′24″N 1°40′18″W	1134609	Oakwell Hall Including Boundary Wall More images
Huddersfield railway station	Huddersfield town centre	Gate	1846-50	3 March 1952	SE1431316909; 53°38′55″N 1°47′06″W	1277385	Huddersfield railway station More images
Lees Hall	Thornhill Lees, Dewsbury	House	1530	30 June 1949	SE2330919992; 53°40′33″N 1°38′55″W	1313642	Lees Hall More images

== Leeds ==
Name	Location	Type	Completed	Date designated	Grid ref. Geo-coordinates	Entry number	Image
Church of All Hallows	Bardsey	Parish Church	850-950	30 March 1966	SE3656143123; 53°52′59″N 1°26′43″W	1135652	Church of All Hallows More images
Open Temple at West End of Quarter Mile Walk in Bramham Park	Bramham Park, Bramham	Garden Temple	Early 18th century	30 March 1966	SE4046341351; 53°52′00″N 1°23′10″W	1313176	Open Temple at West End of Quarter Mile Walk in Bramham Park
Retaining Wall to South Terrace and Eastern Part of Garden Terminating at the Four Faces Avenue	Bramham Park, Bramham	Garden Wall	1727-28	22 July 1986	SE4061341155; 53°51′54″N 1°23′02″W	1066000	Upload Photo
Stone Surround to T-shaped Pond	Bramham Park, Bramham	Garden Wall	1728	2 September 1952	SE4063641202; 53°51′56″N 1°23′01″W	1135662	Upload Photo
The Rotunda in the Black Fen Pleasure Ground	Bramham Park, Bramham	Garden Temple	Mid 18th century	1 May 1960	SE4136040835; 53°51′44″N 1°22′21″W	1066002	The Rotunda in the Black Fen Pleasure Ground More images
Bramham Park	Bramham Park, Bramham	Country House	1700-10	2 September 1952	SE4084641724; 53°52′12″N 1°22′49″W	1135635	Bramham Park More images
Chapel at North End of Terrace to Rear of Bramham Park	Bramham Park, Bramham	Summerhouse/Watertower	1750-62	30 March 1966	SE4077541810; 53°52′15″N 1°22′53″W	1135640	Chapel at North End of Terrace to Rear of Bramham Park More images
Gatepiers at Entrance to Forecourt of Bramham Park with Attached Retaining Wall	Bramham Park, Bramham	Gate	Early 18th century	30 March 1966	SE4093941778; 53°52′14″N 1°22′44″W	1135636	Gatepiers at Entrance to Forecourt of Bramham Park with Attached Retaining Wall
Gothic Temple Approximately 370 Metres South of Bramham Park House	Bramham Park, Bramham	Garden Temple	18th century	2 September 1952	SE4080141343; 53°52′00″N 1°22′52″W	1200485	Gothic Temple Approximately 370 Metres South of Bramham Park House More images
Obelisk Pond and the Great Cascade Approximately 300 Metres South of Bramham Park House	Bramham Park, Bramham	Garden Pool	1724-5	30 March 1966	SE4099441492; 53°52′05″N 1°22′41″W	1300743	Obelisk Pond and the Great Cascade Approximately 300 Metres South of Bramham Park House
Parterre to West of Bramham Park House with 2 Pillars and 6 Urns	Bramham Park, Bramham	Terrace	Early 18th century	3 December 1986	SE4078641711; 53°52′12″N 1°22′52″W	1135639	Upload Photo
Stable Block Forming South Side of Forecourt to Bramham Park	Bramham Park, Bramham	House	Early 18th century	30 March 1966	SE4092441724; 53°52′12″N 1°22′45″W	1135638	Stable Block Forming South Side of Forecourt to Bramham Park
T Pond at Junction of Walks Approximately 350 Metres South West of Bramham Park House	Bramham Park, Bramham	Formal Garden	1728	30 March 1966	SE4066241414; 53°52′02″N 1°22′59″W	1135642	Upload Photo
Puritan Chapel	Bramhope	Nonconformist Chapel	1649	22 November 1966	SE2490543592; 53°53′17″N 1°37′21″W	1261799	Puritan Chapel More images
Lumb Hall	Drighlington	Clothiers House	c. 1640	7 August 1964	SE2270829359; 53°45′36″N 1°39′25″W	1135127	Lumb Hall More images
Church of All Saints	Harewood Park, Harewood	Church	1775	30 March 1966	SE3137345003; 53°54′01″N 1°31′26″W	1266157	Church of All Saints More images
Harewood Castle	Harewood Park, Harewood	Castle	Mid 14th century	30 March 1966	SE3217845622; 53°54′21″N 1°30′42″W	1226242	Harewood Castle More images
Harewood House	Harewood Park, Harewood	Country House	1759-71	30 March 1960	SE3116044628; 53°53′49″N 1°31′38″W	1225861	Harewood House More images
Stables Approximately 200 Metres to South West of Harewood House	Harewood Park, Harewood	Stables	1755-58	30 March 1966	SE3109644401; 53°53′41″N 1°31′42″W	1266160	Stables Approximately 200 Metres to South West of Harewood House More images
Church of St Mary	Kippax	Church	Anglo Saxon	15 September 1987	SE4168430329; 53°46′04″N 1°22′09″W	1237399	Church of St Mary More images
Church of All Saints	Ledsham	Church	Saxon	3 February 1967	SE4565029774; 53°45′44″N 1°18′32″W	1237404	Church of All Saints More images
Ledston Lodge	Ledston Park, Ledsham	House	17th century	3 February 1967	SE4501230906; 53°46′21″N 1°19′07″W	1264072	Ledston Lodge More images
Barn Forming East Side of Stable Yard Approximately 100 Metres East of Ledston Hall	Ledston	Barn	17th century	4 July 1952	SE4366528907; 53°45′17″N 1°20′21″W	1237515	Upload Photo
Entrance Gates and Lodges	Ledston	Gate Lodge	Early 18th century	4 July 1952	SE4358528887; 53°45′16″N 1°20′26″W	1264075	Upload Photo
Ledston Hall	Ledston	Country House	c. 1200	4 July 1952	SE4354628933; 53°45′18″N 1°20′28″W	1237569	Ledston Hall More images
Stable Block Approximately 50 Metres East of Ledston Hall	Ledston	Stables	17th century	4 July 1952	SE4362928920; 53°45′17″N 1°20′23″W	1247674	Upload Photo
The Town Hall	Morley town centre	Town Hall	1892-95	12 March 1980	SE2633527783; 53°44′45″N 1°36′08″W	1135112	The Town Hall More images
Parish Church of All Saints	Otley town centre	Church	Saxon	30 July 1951	SE2015745363; 53°54′15″N 1°41′41″W	1200290	Parish Church of All Saints More images
Calverley Old Hall	Calverley	House	14th - 16th century	25 May 1966	SE2079636877; 53°49′40″N 1°41′08″W	1265966	Calverley Old Hall More images
Church of St John the Evangelist	Leeds city centre	Church	1632-1634	26 September 1963	SE3024333855; 53°48′00″N 1°32′32″W	1375157	Church of St John the Evangelist More images
Church of St John the Baptist	Adel, Leeds	Anglican Church	1150-1170	26 September 1963	SE2746240235; 53°51′27″N 1°35′02″W	1255610	Church of St John the Baptist More images
Church of St Mary	Whitkirk	Anglican Church	15th century	26 September 1963	SE3635033582; 53°47′50″N 1°26′59″W	1375130	Church of St Mary More images
Church of St Oswald	Guiseley	Church	11th century	19 October 1962	SE1941542145; 53°52′31″N 1°42′22″W	1135598	Church of St Oswald More images
Church of St Oswald	Methley	Parish Church	14th century	5 June 1964	SE3910826620; 53°44′04″N 1°24′31″W	1135664	Church of St Oswald More images
Church of St Saviour	Richmond Hill, Leeds	Anglican Church	1842-1845	26 September 1963	SE3129032944; 53°47′31″N 1°31′35″W	1375400	Church of St Saviour More images
Church of the Epiphany	Gipton, Leeds	Anglican Church	1936-1938	25 June 1993	SE3356435305; 53°48′47″N 1°29′30″W	1255904	Church of the Epiphany More images
Leeds City Markets	Leeds city centre	Market Hall	c. 1875	8 May 1973	SE3045033526; 53°47′50″N 1°32′21″W	1255765	Leeds City Markets More images
Leeds Corn Exchange	Leeds city centre	Corn exchange	1863	19 October 1951	SE3039333387; 53°47′45″N 1°32′24″W	1255771	Leeds Corn Exchange More images
Fulneck Moravian Church and attached ranges to either side including the Boys' School and Girls' School	Fulneck Moravian Settlement, Pudsey	Moravian Settlement	1746-48	17 May 1972	SE2221031999; 53°47′02″N 1°39′52″W	1135096	Fulneck Moravian Church and attached ranges to either side including the Boys' School and Girls' School More images
Holy Trinity Church	Leeds city centre	Anglican Church	1721-1727	26 September 1963	SE3016433415; 53°47′46″N 1°32′37″W	1255870	Holy Trinity Church More images
Kirkstall Abbey	Kirkstall, Leeds	Abbey	1152-1182	26 September 1963	SE2597736085; 53°49′13″N 1°36′25″W	1256668	Kirkstall Abbey More images
Leeds General Infirmary	Leeds city centre	Hospital	1863-68	8 October 1970	SE2967233991; 53°48′05″N 1°33′03″W	1256242	Leeds General Infirmary More images
Leeds Minster	Leeds city centre	Church	1839-1841	26 September 1963	SE3065833301; 53°47′42″N 1°32′10″W	1375046	Leeds Minster More images
Temple Mill	Holbeck, Leeds	Fireproof Factory	1838-1840	19 October 1951	SE2952532691; 53°47′23″N 1°33′12″W	1375162	Temple Mill More images
Temple Newsam House	Temple Newsam, Leeds	Country House	Early 16th century	19 October 1951	SE3571232108; 53°47′03″N 1°27′34″W	1255943	Temple Newsam House More images
Leeds Town Hall	Leeds city centre	Town Hall	1853-1858	19 October 1951	SE2975233866; 53°48′01″N 1°32′59″W	1255772	Leeds Town Hall More images

== Wakefield ==
Name	Location	Type	Completed	Date designated	Grid ref. Geo-coordinates	Entry number	Image
Ackworth School (that Part Comprising Centre Block & East and West Wings, Shed Court, Main Entrance)	Low Ackworth, Ackworth	Courtyard	1786	6 June 1952	SE4409117122; 53°38′56″N 1°20′04″W	1025067	Ackworth School (that Part Comprising Centre Block & East and West Wings, Shed Court, Main Entrance) More images
Church of St Mary	Badsworth	Parish Church	15th century	25 March 1968	SE4633214972; 53°37′45″N 1°18′03″W	1052219	Church of St Mary More images
Church of St Luke and All Saints	Darrington	Church	Norman	11 December 1967	SE4850820179; 53°40′33″N 1°16′02″W	1313210	Church of St Luke and All Saints More images
Church of St Peter and St Leonard	Horbury	Church	Saxon	15 February 1966	SE2951518368; 53°39′39″N 1°33′17″W	1135508	Church of St Peter and St Leonard More images
Horbury Hall	Horbury	Hall House	1478-92	15 February 1966	SE2954218336; 53°39′38″N 1°33′16″W	1135510	Horbury Hall More images
Kettlethorpe Hall	Kettlethorpe	House	1727	14 July 1953	SE3330016698; 53°38′45″N 1°29′52″W	1259736	Kettlethorpe Hall More images
Church of St Michael and Our Lady (Wragby Parish Church)	Nostell Park, Nostell	Church	Dated 1533	25 March 1968	SE4077617299; 53°39′02″N 1°23′04″W	1253565	Church of St Michael and Our Lady (Wragby Parish Church) More images
Nostell Priory	Nostell Park, Nostell	Country House	1736-50	6 June 1952	SE4040917526; 53°39′10″N 1°23′24″W	1262071	Nostell Priory More images
Stables at Nostell Priory	Nostell Park, Nostell	Garage	1952	6 June 1952	SE4047817405; 53°39′06″N 1°23′21″W	1253558	Stables at Nostell Priory More images
Stanley Ferry Aqueduct	Normanton	Aqueduct	1837-39	9 October 1987	SE3558023028; 53°42′09″N 1°27′45″W	1261690	Stanley Ferry Aqueduct More images
The Hermitage, under the Infirmary.	Pontefract	Hermitage	Medieval	15 November 1988	SE4566721793; 53°41′26″N 1°18′36″W	1135427	Upload Photo
Church of St Peter	Felkirk, South Hiendley	Parish Church	Norman	25 March 1968	SE3868912603; 53°36′31″N 1°25′00″W	1265442	Church of St Peter More images
Church of All Saints	South Kirkby	Parish Church	13th century	25 March 1968	SE4529711071; 53°35′39″N 1°19′02″W	1227519	Church of All Saints More images
Frieston's Hospital	Heath Common, Wakefield	Almshouse	c. 1595	14 February 1952	SE3607220896; 53°41′00″N 1°27′19″W	1313217	Frieston's Hospital More images
Heath Hall	Heath Common, Wakefield	Country House	c. 1709	14 February 1952	SE3555820186; 53°40′37″N 1°27′47″W	1200238	Heath Hall More images
Flanking Screen Walls and Gate Piers Attached to West Front of Heath Hall Linking East and West Pavilions	Heath Common, Wakefield	Gate Pier	c. 1767	14 February 1952	SE3557720156; 53°40′36″N 1°27′46″W	1200345	Upload Photo
The Brewhouse and East Pavilion at Heath Hall	Heath Common, Wakefield	Apartment	1982-84	14 February 1952	SE3559320155; 53°40′36″N 1°27′46″W	1313191	The Brewhouse and East Pavilion at Heath Hall More images
The Stable House, Heath Hall	Heath Common, Wakefield	Bothy	c. 1754	14 February 1952	SE3554720243; 53°40′39″N 1°27′48″W	1135583	The Stable House, Heath Hall
The West Pavilion, Heath Hall	Heath Common, Wakefield	Flats	1986	14 February 1952	SE3554820210; 53°40′38″N 1°27′48″W	1200273	The West Pavilion, Heath Hall
Church of St Peter	Woolley	Church	15th century	22 November 1966	SE3193613016; 53°36′46″N 1°31′08″W	1200723	Church of St Peter More images
Cathedral Church of All Saints	Wakefield city centre	Cathedral	Early 15th century	14 July 1953	SE3333220841; 53°40′59″N 1°29′49″W	1258237	Cathedral Church of All Saints More images
Chapel of St Mary on East Side of Wakefield Bridge	Wakefield city centre	Bridge Chapel	c. 1350	14 July 1953	SE3382320140; 53°40′36″N 1°29′22″W	1258242	Chapel of St Mary on East Side of Wakefield Bridge More images
County Hall (offices of West Yorkshire County Council)	Wakefield city centre	County Hall	1894-98	30 March 1971	SE3295521008; 53°41′04″N 1°30′09″W	1242349	County Hall (offices of West Yorkshire County Council) More images
Town Hall	Wakefield city centre	Local Government Office	1971	30 March 1971	SE3302720927; 53°41′02″N 1°30′05″W	1258995	Town Hall More images
Wakefield Bridge	Wakefield city centre	Bridge	Early-Mid 14th century	14 July 1953	SE3381020135; 53°40′36″N 1°29′23″W	1273508	Wakefield Bridge More images

== See also ==
- Category:Grade I listed buildings in West Yorkshire
- Grade II* listed buildings in West Yorkshire

== Sources ==
- National Heritage List for England
