= Ivo de Aldeburgh =

English soldier and sheriff

- Occupation: Soldier

Ivo de Aldeburgh was an English soldier that served in the Scottish wars and the French wars. He served as Sheriff of Edinburgh, Haddington and Linlithgow in 1305 and as Sheriff of Rutland in 1321.

== Biography ==
Ivo took part in the Scottish wars of Edward I and Edward II. He was appointed as the Sheriff of the three Lothians in 1305. Edward Balliol granted him lands in Broxmouth which were later confirmed by Edward III. Ivo was the Warden of Roxburgh in 1312. He was appointed as Sheriff of Rutland in 1321, and constable of Oakham Castle.

== Marriage and issue ==
He is known to have married Mary and had the following known issue:

- William de Aldeburgh (died 1387), married Elizabeth de Lisle, had issue.
- Catherine de Aldeburgh
