= Listed buildings in Harewood, West Yorkshire =

Harewood, West Yorkshire is a civil parish in the metropolitan borough of the City of Leeds, West Yorkshire, England. It contains 105 listed buildings that are recorded in the National Heritage List for England. Of these, four are listed at Grade I, the highest of the three grades, eight are at Grade II*, the middle grade, and the others are at Grade II, the lowest grade. The parish contains the country house, Harewood House, and its grounds, the village of Harewood, and the surrounding countryside. The house is listed, together with many buildings in its grounds, including All Saints' Church. Most of the houses in the village are listed, together with associated structures, and in the surrounding area the listed buildings include farmhouses and farm buildings, an ancient meeting stone, a ruined castle, bridges, tombs and headstones in the churchyard, milestones, and a guidestone.

== Key ==
Grade	Criteria
I	Buildings of exceptional interest, sometimes considered to be internationally important
II*	Particularly important buildings of more than special interest
II	Buildings of national importance and special interest

== Buildings ==
Name and location	Photograph	Date	Notes	Grade
The Grey Stone; 53.88260°N 1.52216°W		Prehistoric (probable)	An ancient meeting stone, it is in gritstone in the grounds of Harewood House, and roughly octagonal with a pointed top. On the north face is a cup and ring mark. The stone is also a scheduled monument.	II
Harewood Castle; 53.90591°N 1.51167°W		Mid 14th century	A fortified house, now in ruins, it is in gritstone and without a roof. The building consists of an elongated rectangle, with projecting angle turrets at the south end, and an entrance tower against the east side. The hall range has two storeys, the service range has three, and the corner turrets have four storeys. The east front has five bays, and the projecting tower has an entrance with a pointed arch and a chamfered surround, above which are the remains of a traceried chapel window flanked by shields. Elsewhere are the remains of mullioned windows and arrow slits. The castle is also a scheduled monument.	I
All Saints' Church; 53.90028°N 1.52409°W		c. 1410	A redundant church in the park of Harewood House, it was restored in 1862–63 by Sir George Gilbert Scott. The church is built in gritstone with a roof of Westmorland green slate, and is in Perpendicular style. It consists of a nave, north and south aisles, a south porch, a chancel with a north vestry, and a west tower embraced by the aisles. The tower has two stages and contains a west doorway with a pointed arch, above which is a five-light window, two-light bell windows, a clock face on the south, and an embattled parapet. The porch is gabled with a sundial in the apex, and on the corners of the church are angled buttresses and crocketed gables.	I
Cottage opposite Gateways; 53.89894°N 1.51108°W		1675	A stone house with quoins, a continuous hood mould over the ground floor, and a stone slate roof. There are two storeys and a symmetrical gabled front of three bays. The central doorway has composite jambs, a moulded surround and an ogee lintel inscribed with the date and initials. Above the doorway are round-arched windows in the upper floor and gable with sunken spandrels, and the other windows are mullioned with some mullions missing.	II
Cutler's Cottage; 53.90398°N 1.51270°W		1678	The house is in gritstone with a continuous moulded hood mould over the ground floor, and a stone slate roof. There are two storeys, two bays, and an attached single-storey stable. The doorway has composite jambs, and a Tudor arched initialled and dated lintel, and the windows have been altered. The stable is now incorporated into the house, and it contains a large sash window.	II
Sundial in the Old Vicarage garden 53.89969°N 1.50827°W	—	1688	The sundial is in stone and consists of a column with a moulded dial plate. The dial plate is engraved with lettering and the date, and on it is a copper dial with the maker's name.	II
Chest tomb to Elizabeth and James Stable; 53.90002°N 1.52417°W	—	c. 1723	The chest tomb is in the churchyard of All Saints' Church. It is in stone on a chamfered plinth, with panels on the sides, and on the top is lettering and carving, including an hourglass, a skull, crossed bones, and winged heads.	II
Harewood Bridge; 53.90985°N 1.52626°W		1729	The bridge carries Harrogate Road (A61 road) over the River Wharfe, and it was widened in 1775. It is in stone and consists of four segmental arches that have pointed cutwaters with angled caps. On the east side are chamfered voussoirs with two orders, and the west side has unchamfered voussoirs. The abutments splay out at each end, and on the bridge are inscribed metal plaques.	II*
11 The Avenue; 53.90027°N 1.50991°W		Early to mid 18th century	A house designed by John Carr, it is in stone with a sill band, an eaves band, and a stone slate roof. There is a symmetrical front of five bays, the middle three bays with three storeys under a pedimented gable with moulded coping, and the outer bays with two storeys and hipped roofs. In the middle and outer bays are round-arched recesses. The central doorway has an architrave, a fanlight, and a moulded cornice on consoles. The windows are sashes, those in the upper floor of the outer bays with round-arched heads. In the right return is a stair window, and a doorway with monolithic jambs.	II*
Bridge across Stank Beck; 53.90251°N 1.53973°W	—	18th century (probable)	The footbridge is a clapper bridge crossing Stank Beck. It consists of three rectangular stones on two thin cutwaters. On each bank is a stone wall, and on the north side is a wooden handrail.	II
Barn west of Hawks House; 53.90326°N 1.54040°W	—	Mid 18th century (probable)	A stone barn with quoins and a stone slate roof. There are five bays and a single aisle. On the front is a segmental-arched cart entry, a doorway with a fanlight, and rectangular vents, and at the rear is a lower segmental-arched cart entry.	II
Forge house and archway, Home Farm; 53.89642°N 1.53351°W		Mid 18th century	The forge house was designed by John Carr, it is in stone with an eaves band, and has a hipped stone slate roof. There is a single storey, and on the front are five large multi-paned windows, two doorways to the left, and one to the right. At the rear is a flue-box and two blocked windows. On the left return is a three-light mullioned window, and attached is a segmental arch with projecting flat coping.	II
Home Farmhouse; 53.89720°N 1.53387°W	—	18th century	Originally a garden pavilion, with houses added in the early 19th century. The pavilion is in rendered brick with stone dressings on a plinth, with a rusticated impost band, and a stone slate roof with a pedimented gable. It has a single storey, and three semicircular arches with rusticated keystones, the central arch containing a 20th-century doorway, and the outer arches with sash windows. The houses are in stone on a plinth, and have stone slate roofs with coped gables and kneelers. They are in one and two storeys, forming an L-shaped plan, with a double-depth plan, and one bay each.	II
Milestone at junction with Eccup Lane; 53.89630°N 1.55462°W		18th century	The milestone is on High Weardley Lane at its junction with Eccup Lane. It consists of a square arched stone inscribed with pointing hands and the distances to Otley and Eccup.	II
Milestone at junction with Weardley Lane; 53.89635°N 1.55427°W	—	18th century	The milestone is on High Weardley Lane at its junction with Weardley Lane. It consists of a rectangular arched stone inscribed with a pointed hand and the distances to Harewood and Harewood Bridge.	II
Wike Manor; 53.87482°N 1.48912°W		Mid 18th century	A stone house on a plinth, with quoins, and a stone slate roof with coped gables and kneelers. There are two storeys, two bays, and a recessed outbuilding on the right. The doorway has monolithic jambs, and an angled hood. The windows are mullioned with three lights, the central lights higher. At the rear is a round-headed stair window with impost blocks and a keystone.	II
Lofthouse Farmhouse; 53.88298°N 1.50116°W		c. 1755	The farmhouse is in stone with quoins and a hipped stone slate roof. The main part of the house has two storeys and three bays, the middle bay projecting and with three storeys. This is flanked by coped walls linked to one-storey single-bay pavilions. Steps lead up to a central doorway with monolithic jambs, and the windows are mullioned. The pavilions have pyramidal roofs, and contain a window with an oculus above.	II
Gatepiers, walls, railings and gates, Lofthouse Lodge; 53.88345°N 1.50700°W		c. 1755	At the Lofthouse entrance to Harewood House are a pair of gate piers, a pair of smaller piers, and quadrant walls ending in piers. The main and smaller piers have channelled rustication, a Doric entablature, and triangular pediments. The main piers also have a moulded cornice, and a frieze with paterae. The quadrant wall are coped with railings; the railings and gates are in cast and wrought iron. The end piers are small and square and have cornices and slightly domed caps.	II
Stables, Harewood House; 53.89505°N 1.52852°W		1755–58	The stables, later used for other purposes, are in stone on a plinth, with quoins, bands, and a roof of Westmorland green slate. They are in Palladian style, with two storeys, and form a quadrangle with sides of eleven bays. On each front the middle three bays project under a triangular pediment. The central bays of the north front have engaged Tuscan columns, and in the middle is an archway with impost bands and a rusticated keystone. The tympanum contains a panel, and at the top are finials. The outer bays also project, and have rusticated quoins, a Diocletian window, and a shaped parapet with corner finials. The interior has a colonnade of paired Tuscan columns on three sides, a central pediment, and Diocletian windows.	I
Harewood House; 53.89690°N 1.52729°W		1759–71	A country house, the central part was designed by John Carr, the lateral extensions and wings are by Robert Adam, and the house was altered and heightened in 1843 by Charles Barry. It is in millstone grit on a plinth, with a rusticated basement, a band, and a roof of Westmorland green slate with balustraded parapets. The south front is symmetrical and has a central block with seven bays and a double-flight staircase. This is flanked by three-bay links to single-bay pavilions, each with a Venetian window flanked by Corinthian pilasters and with a balustraded balcony.	I
12–15 The Avenue; 53.90024°N 1.51025°W		c. 1760	Originally a ribbon factory, converted into four cottages in 1770 by John Carr. The cottages are in stone on a plinth, with quoins, a band, and a hipped stone slate roof. There are two storeys and eight bays, and in each bay is a giant semicircular arched recess. Four of the bays contain doorways with monolithic jambs, and in the other bays are three-light mullioned windows. The upper floors contain Diocletian windows.	II*
Ice House, Harewood House; 53.89481°N 1.52896°W		c. 1760	The ice house is in sandstone with brick lining. It has a circular coped wall and a domed roof. The entrance is in brick and consists of a passage with a rounded roof. The ice chamber is cylindrical and has an elliptical-arched doorway.	II
22–27 Harrowgate Road and 17–21 The Avenue; 53.90026°N 1.51129°W		Mid to late 18th century	A row of eleven, now ten, cottages designed by John Carr. They are in stone on a plinth, with quoins, and a hipped stone slate roof. There are two storeys, two ranges at right angles with 14 and 12 bays, and between Nos. 16 and 17 The Avenue is a single-storey link. The doorways have chamfered surrounds and monolithic jambs on plinths, and most of the windows have been altered to casements.	II
2–5 The Avenue; 53.90031°N 1.50908°W		Mid to late 18th century	A chapel and cottages, later four houses, designed by John Carr. They are in stone on a plinth, with bands, and a stone slate roof. There is a symmetrical front of eight bays, the middle four bays with two storeys, and the outer bays taller with attics and hipped roofs, and projecting slightly. Each of the outer bays has a giant semicircular arched recess, and these contain doorways with monolithic jambs, flat-arched windows with voussoirs in the upper floor, and segmental-headed windows in the attics. In the middle bays are doorways and windows with monolithic lintels and false voussoirs.	II*
6–10 The Avenue; 53.90029°N 1.50949°W		Mid to late 18th century	A row of five cottages designed by John Carr. They are in stone on a plinth, with quoins, a band, and a hipped stone slate roof. There are two storeys and ten bays, and in each bay is a giant semicircular arched recess. Four of the bays contain doorways with monolithic jambs and lintels with tripartite keystones. In the other ground floor bays are windows with monolithic lintels, and the upper floor windows have segmental-arched heads.	II*
16 The Avenue; 53.90023°N 1.51067°W		Mid to late 18th century	A manager's house designed by John Carr, it is in stone on a plinth, with a roof of Westmorland green slate. There is a symmetrical front of seven bays, the middle three bays with three storeys under a pedimented gable with moulded coping, and the outer bays with two storeys, two bays and hipped roofs. The central doorway has an architrave, a frieze, and a moulded cornice, and the flanking windows have similar cornices. The windows are sashes, the window above the doorway with a cast iron balcony.	II*
1–3 Stank Cottages and outbuilding 53.89780°N 1.53699°W	—	Mid to late 18th century	A group of three cottages and an outbuilding designed by John Carr, they are in stone on a plinth, with quoins, a band, and stone slate roofs with a coped gable on the left. There are two storeys, and an L-shaped plan. No. 1 has a giant arched recess with sash windows, and a triangular pediment. There are single-story sheds at the rear, and an attached linking outbuilding that has six doorways with tie-stone jambs, Nos. 2 and 3 are at right angles and have doorways with monolithic jambs and small-pane casement windows.	II
4 and 5 Stank Cottages; 53.89815°N 1.53723°W	—	Mid to late 18th century	A pair of houses designed by John Carr, they are in stone on a plinth, with a sill band, an impost band, and a stone slate roof with pedimented gables. There are two storeys and a T-shaped plan, with a symmetrical front of seven bays, the middle three bays taller, projecting and gabled. In the ground floor the windows and doorways have round arches. The windows in the centre bays are sashes, and in the outer bays they have been altered.	II
6, 7 and 8 Stank Cottages and outbuildings 53.89799°N 1.53780°W	—	Mid to late 18th century	A row of three cottages and linked outbuildings designed by John Carr, they are in stone with quoins, and stone slate roofs with coped gables. No. 8 is a T-shaped pavilion with a pedimented gable and an L-shaped range to the rear. To the north are single-storey outbuildings that have nine doorways with tie-stone jambs. These link to the other cottages at right angles that have six bays. All the windows have been converted into casements.	II
Alwoodley Lodges, gates and walls 53.86809°N 1.52349°W		Mid to late 18th century	A pair of lodges flanking the entrance to the drive, they are in stone on plinths, with roofs of slate and lead. They have a single storey, on a quadrant curve, each with three bays, an entablature, a moulded cornice and a blocking course. They contain three round-arched windows in semicircular-arched recesses, with voussoirs, and archivolts linked by impost bands. Between them are gate piers and gates in cast and wrought iron. Outside the lodges are low stone walls with flat coping, ending in square piers.	II
Bridge over roadway between stables and Home Farm; 53.89608°N 1.53231°W	—	Mid to late 18th century	An accommodation bridge in stone consisting of a single basket arch. It has voussoirs, an impost band, semicircular-arched recesses, and a coped parapet.	II
Carr House Barn; 53.89041°N 1.53810°W		Mid to late 18th century	A stone barn with quoins and a stone slate roof. There are four bays with an aisle, and a lean-to on the right. On the front is a flat-arched cart entry with composite jambs, voussoirs, and a keystone. At the rear is a plinth, a cart entry and a window, and in the right return are two doorways.	II
Keystone Cottage; 53.90190°N 1.51217°W		Mid to late 18th century	A house designed by John Carr, it is in stone on a plinth, with a modillion coped pediment containing a blind oculus in the tympanum, and a stone slate roof. There are two storeys, three bays on the front, two on the sides, and a flat-roofed bay to the right. The doorway and the windows on the front, which are sashes, have monolithic lintels. At the rear is a similar pedimented gable, and the windows have wedge lintels with false voussoirs.	II
Workshops and houses, Home Farm; 53.89666°N 1.53314°W		Mid to late 18th century	The workshops are older, with the houses added in the early 19th century, they are in stone with roofs of Westmorland green slate. There are one and two storeys, and they form an L-shaped plan. The north range has a coped gable on the left and a house with a symmetrical front of three bays. The doorway has a fanlight and a lintel with false voussoirs, and the windows are sashes. The workshop has ten bays the doorways have tie-stone jambs and similar lintels, the ground floor windows have cambered arches with voussoirs and contain sashes, some sliding, and in the upper floor is a twelve-paned window. The east range has a continuation of the workshop, and a house with quoins, two storeys and three bays.	II
Methodist Chapel and Post Office; 90 The Avenue; 53.89982°N 1.51059°W		Mid to late 18th century	A house, later used as a chapel and post office, it is in stone with quoins, and a stone slate roof with coped gables and kneelers. There are two storeys, a double-depth plan, a symmetrical range of three bays, and a two-bay wing to the right, recessed and slightly canted. The doorway has an architrave, a frieze, and a moulded cornice, and the windows are sashes. The chapel is now closed.	II
Guidepost, Wike; 53.87332°N 1.48765°W		Mid to late 18th century (probable)	The guidepost near a road junction consists of a weathered stone. It is inscribed with a pointing hand, and lettering including "Leeds" and "miles".	II
Walls, railings and lean-tos, Rectangular walled garden 53.89304°N 1.53189°W	—	Mid to late 18th century	The walls that enclose the garden in the grounds of Harewood House are in orange-red brick, partly rendered, with stone coping. There are external buttresses, and the southeast corner is angled. Inside the north wall are two parallel ranges of stone outbuildings with stone slate roofs, and one and two storeys. In the centre of the south wall is an arched arbour that has a pediment with moulded modillion coping. Inside is a semicircular stone bench flanked by two sculpted owls, and above is a domed ceiling. Attached to the southwest corner of the garden are railings extending for about 8 metres (26 ft), and an iron gate.	II
Rose Garden Terrace walls and arbour 53.89377°N 1.53094°W	—	Mid to late 18th century	The rose garden in the grounds of Harewood House has two rectangular terraces with coped walls, and steps flanked by three miniature Tuscan columns. The arbour has two Tuscan columns, and it contains a sculpture in bas-relief. At the rear is a lean-to with two storeys and five bays, quoins, a doorway with tie-stone jambs, and windows. Railings in cast and wrought iron run between the lean-to and the lake.	II
Sundial in the Rock Garden; 53.89553°N 1.53382°W	—	Mid to late 18th century	The sundial is in carved freestone on a square stone base. It consists of an octagonal tapering shaft, on a probably re-used inverted Roman Ionic capital carved with egg and dart ornament.	II
Sundial in the Rose Garden; 53.89334°N 1.53202°W	—	Mid to late 18th century	The sundial in the centre of the rose garden is in stone. It consists of a vase-shaped pedestal with a round top on a rectangular plinth. On the top is a stone dial engraved with Roman numerals, sun and shadow, and a Greek key ornament, and a copper gnomon.	II
Stable's House; 53.90293°N 1.53280°W	—	Mid to late 18th century	A stone house with quoins, and a stone slate roof with coped gables and kneelers. There are two storeys, a double-depth plan, two bays, a lower bay recessed on the right, and a lean-to on the left. The main doorway on the front has a chamfered surround and tie-stone jambs. One of the windows has three lights and has retained its mullions, and the others have sliding sashes. In the right bay is a doorway with a monolithic lintel with false voussoirs, and at the rear is a tall stair window. In the outshut is a re-set doorway with a Tudor arch and a chamfered surround.	II
Granary, Stanks Farm; 53.89651°N 1.53419°W		Mid to late 18th century	The granary, which was designed by John Carr, is in stone on a plinth, with quoins, a floor band, a moulded impost band, a modillion cornice to oversailing eaves, and a pyramidal stone slate roof with a lantern and weathervane. There are three storeys and one bay. In the first floor is a blocked Venetian window with voussoirs in a semicircular-arched recess. At the rear is a taking-in door with a chamfered surround and tie-stone jambs, a projecting ledge, sliding sash windows, a metal crane, and a bullseye window.	II
Swank; 53.90204°N 1.51216°W	—	Mid to late 18th century	A house and two cottages on a corner site at one time used as a shop. They were designed by John Carr, and are in stone with stone slate roofs. The house has two storeys and fronts of three and two bays. On the main front is an inserted canted bay window, and in the upper floor are two windows, the middle one blind, with wedge lintels. At the top is a pedimented gable with a blind oculus in the tympanum, and at the rear is a modillion pedimented gable. In the front facing the main road are a doorway and windows that have monolithic lintels with false voussoirs. The cottages to the right have a single storey and six bays, and contain quoins, doorways with monolithic jambs and tie-stones, and windows with monolithic lintels.	II
The Head Gardener's House; 53.89566°N 1.53566°W		Mid to late 18th century	The house in the grounds of Harewood House is in stone, with quoins, and a hipped stone slate roof. There are two storeys and a symmetrical front of five bays. In the centre is a doorway with a fanlight, and the windows are sashes with raised stone surrounds and projecting sills.	II
The Terrace Cottage; 53.89566°N 1.53566°W		Mid to late 18th century	Originally a brewhouse in the grounds of Harewood House and later used for other purposes, it is in stone on a plinth, with a moulded eaves cornice, and a hipped roof of Westmorland green slate. The building has an irregular plan, consisting of a two-storey block, and a single-storey wing. In the front facing the drive is a tripartite sash window with mullions and a moulded triangular pediment. The doorway in the left return has an architrave and a fanlight. Elsewhere, the windows are sashes.	II
Walls, Triangular garden 53.89380°N 1.53500°W		Mid to late 18th century	The walls enclose the Triangular Garden, a former fruit garden, in the grounds of Harewood House. They are in orange-red brick with stone coping, and form an equilateral triangle. In the west wall is a doorway with a rusticated Gibbs surround and a triple keystone, and projections for heated flues.	II
Barn and stables east of Wike Manor; 53.87487°N 1.48858°W	—	Mid to late 18th century	The barn and stables are in stone with a stone slate roof, and have an L-shaped plan, consisting of two ranges at right angles. The barn has seven bays, and contains a segmental-arched cart entry with composite jambs and voussoirs, windows, and a blocked doorway. The stable has two storeys and six bays, and a hipped roof to the right.	II
Dovecote and stables south of Wike Manor; 53.87471°N 1.48889°W	—	Mid to late 18th century	The dovecote and attached stables are in stone with stone slate roofs. The stable has a single storey, and contains three doorways with tie-stone jambs and a small window. The dovecote is taller, and has random openings, and food chutes at the rear.	II
Harewood School and School House; 53.90106°N 1.51149°W		c. 1768	The school and master's house on the left were designed by John Carr and later extended. It is in stone on a plinth, with quoins, a band, and hipped stone slate roofs. There is a symmetrical front, with a single-storey three-bay hall range, and flanking two-storey, one-bay pavilion blocks. The extension to the left is a lean-to, and the extension at right angles on the right is a tall schoolroom with three bays, coped gables and a bellcote. There is a further lower extension with a roof of Westmorland green slate.	II
Lady Bridge; 53.89869°N 1.54071°W		By 1773	The bridge carries a road over Stank Beck. It is in stone, and consists of a single elliptical arch. The bridge has raised keystones, that on the south initialled and dated, and a canted parapet with chamfered coping, ending in square piers with cornices and pyramidal caps.	II
73–77 The Square; 53.90025°N 1.51272°W		Late 18th century	A row of six, later five, cottages in stone, with an eaves band and a stone slate roof. There are two storeys, a front of twelve bays, and sides of three bays. The outer two bays at each end project, with quoins and hipped roofs. The doorways have chamfered surrounds, fanlights, and monolithic lintels, and the windows are sashes with plain surrounds.	II
Barn to north of granary, Stanks Farm; 53.89671°N 1.53432°W		Late 18th century	The barn is on a plinth, and has a stone slate roof with coped gables and kneelers. It contains a segmental-arched cart entry, six arrow-slit vents, and two rectangular pitching holes, and at the rear is a doorway with composite jambs and a chamfered surround.	II
Stockton Grange Farmhouse; 53.90391°N 1.49351°W		Late 18th century	The farmhouse, which was extended in the early 19th century, is in stone, with quoins, and a stone slate roof with coped gables and kneelers. There are two storeys, the original house has three bays, and there is an added bay to the left. The central doorway has composite jambs, above it is a blind window, and the other windows are sashes. The windows at the rear have lintels with false voussoirs, and there is a stair window.	II
Farfield Farm Barn; 53.90229°N 1.47445°W		c. 1780	The barn is in stone with quoins and a stone slate roof with a coped gable on the right with kneelers. There are five bays, in the centre is a cart entry with a cantilevered segmental arch and a keystone, to the left are two doorways, and to the right is a blocked doorway, all with tie-stone jambs. At the rear is a similar cart entry, flanked by square pitching holes.	II
Chest tomb to Sarah Dickinson; 53.90017°N 1.52372°W	—	c. 1789	The chest tomb is in the churchyard of All Saints' Church. It is in stone on a plinth, with a bellied front and sides, and a fluted frieze. On each side is a rectangular central panel with a guilloché border, and the ends are decorated with an oval scalloped fan design.	II
Ice house and dovecote 53.89540°N 1.53435°W	—	c. 1800	The ice house and dovecote are near the weir in Stank Beck. The building is in stone with a projecting cornice, and a domed concrete-covered roof. It has a circular plan, and is partly sunk in the ground. The doorway has monolithic jambs, and the door has holes and a platform.	II
Moor House; 53.90092°N 1.51309°W		c. 1800	A vicarage designed by John Carr and later used for other purposes, it is in stone on a plinth, with a moulded eaves cornice, a coped parapet, and a hipped roof of Welsh blue slate. There are two storeys, a double depth plan, a symmetrical front of five bays, the middle three bays projecting under a triangular pediment, and a rear outshut. In the central bay is a giant semicircular-arched recess with voussoirs containing a doorway approached by steps, with monolithic jambs, a fanlight, and a cornice on consoles, and above the doorway is a Venetian window. The other windows are sashes with wedge lintels and false voussoirs. At the rear are twin coped gables with kneelers. In the left return is a canted bay window.	II
Gate piers and walls, Moor House; 53.90042°N 1.51292°W	—	c. 1800	The gate piers and walls are in stone. Each pier has a base block, channelled rustication as quoins, a cornice, and a semi-domed cap. The quadrant walls are coped, and each wall ends at a pier, with a short straight section ending in another pier.	II
The Old Corn Mill; 53.90809°N 1.52885°W	—	c. 1800	The former corn mill is in stone on a plinth, and has a roof in Welsh blue slate with coped gables and kneelers. There are three storeys and a loft, and three bays. The openings have flat-arched heads and voussoirs. In the middle floor is a central taking-in door, and there are more doorways in the top floor and the loft.	II
Headstone to Sarah Roberts; 53.89990°N 1.52374°W	—	c. 1801	The headstone is in the churchyard of All Saints' Church. It is in stone and has an arched head carved with foliage and paterae. It contains an inscription incorporating a quotation.	II
Main Entrance, Harewood House; 53.89975°N 1.51300°W		c. 1802	At the main entrance to the grounds is a gatehouse linked by walls to a pair of lodges, all in stone. The gatehouse has a plinth, two storeys and three bays, with four engaged Roman Doric columns and a fluted impost band, a Doric entablature, a moulded cornice and blocking course with a central plaque. In the centre is a semicircular arch, and the outer bays contain semicircular recessed arches containing sash windows with a moulded impost and an architrave. The gates are in cast and wrought iron. Curving walls with railings link the gatehouse to the square lodges. Each lodge has sash windows flanked by Doric columns carrying triangular pediments linked by a fluted frieze, and at the rear is a length of wall surmounted by an urn at the end.	II*
Home Farm buildings 53.89748°N 1.53455°W	—	c. 1805	The farm buildings are in stone with quoins, and hipped stone slate roofs. There are four ranges forming a quadrangle, with one and two storeys. The south range has central gate piers flanked by six-bay open cart sheds. In the west range is a central seven-bay barn and flanking six-bay ranges. The east range contains a central dairy with two storeys and four bays, and flanking single-storey ranges with five and six bays. The north range is symmetrical, with a central two storey nine-bay range and flanking single-storey three-bay ranges. In the middle is a cart entry with quoined jambs and a moulded pedimented coped gable.	II
Farm building in quadrangle, Home Farm; 53.89718°N 1.53448°W	—	c. 1805	The farm building within the quadrangle is in stone, and has a stone slate roof with coped gables and kneelers. There are two storeys at the front and one at the rear, a front of seven bays, and a three-bay stable at right angles. In the ground floor of the main building are alternating windows and doorway with lintels, and the upper floor contains windows with remains of sliding sash windows. The stable contains two stable doors and a window.	II
Headstone to Ann Jackson; 53.89992°N 1.52403°W	—	c. 1808	The headstone is in the churchyard of All Saints' Church. It is in stone and has a shaped top carved with a flower, a frowning face in a rainbow, and flanked by smaller frowning sun faces.	II
Bridge west of East Lodge; 53.90230°N 1.51775°W	—	c. 1815	The road bridge consists of a single segmental arch, constructed from giant boulder voussoirs. The parapet and abutments are in landscaped boulders. The bridge was built to provide access between Harewood House and Harewood Castle.	II
47–50 Bondgate; 53.90375°N 1.51251°W		First quarter of 19th century	A row of four cottages, No. 47 rebuilt and with quoins, they are in stone with a stone slate roof. There are two storeys and twelve bays. The doorways have monolithic lintels and false voussoirs. The windows in No. 47 are sliding sashes, and those in the other cottages have been replaced.	II
51–54 Bondgate; 53.90377°N 1.51306°W		First quarter of 19th century	A row of four cottages in stone with stone slate roofs. There are two storeys and twelve bays. Most of the windows have been altered.	II
40 Harrowgate Road; 53.90231°N 1.51214°W		First quarter of 19th century	A stone house with a stone slate roof, two storeys, and a symmetrical front of five bays. The central doorway is flanked by small windows. All the windows are sashes, and all the lintels are monolithic with false voussoirs.	II
64–66 Harrowgate Road; 53.90400°N 1.51204°W		First quarter of 19th century	A row of three stone cottages with a stone slate roof, two storeys and nine bays. The doorways and windows have monolithic lintels with false voussoirs.	II
Bond Cottage and Redvers Cottage; 53.90366°N 1.51339°W		First quarter of 19th century	A pair of stone cottages with a stone slate roof, two storeys and six bays. The paired doorways in the centre have been converted from windows, and some of the other windows have been altered.	II
Walls, 22–33 Harrowgate Road; 53.90039°N 1.51156°W	—	Early 19th century	Running along the fronts of the gardens are low walls with chamfered coping. They are pierced at intervals by steps leading into the gardens, and between Nos. 27 and 28 they return to flank the entrance to the rear.	II
28–33 Harrowgate Road; 53.90072°N 1.51146°W		Early 19th century (probable)	A row of six cottages in stone, with quoins, an eaves band, paired gutter brackets, and a hipped stone slate roof. There are two storeys, a double-depth plan, and twelve bays. Some sliding sash windows remain, but most have been converted into casements.	II
Wall, 34 Harrowgate Road and School; 53.90102°N 1.51176°W	—	Early 19th century (probable)	The wall enclosing the area to the front of the school and school house is in stone and has a U-shaped plan, turning back towards the building. It is low at the front, with projecting chamfered coping, and ramps up to become higher along the sides.	II
35 and 35A Harrowgate Road; 53.90121°N 1.51149°W		Early 19th century	A shop at right angles to the road, later converted into two cottages, it is in stone on a plinth, with a hipped stone slate roof. There are two storeys, six bays, and a later single-storey extension on the right. The doorways and windows have lintels with false voussoirs, and the windows have been altered to casements.	II
59–63 Harrowgate Road; 53.90376°N 1.51211°W		Early 19th century	A row of five cottages with paired gutter brackets and a stone slate roof. There are two storeys and 16 bays. Each cottage has a central doorway with an architrave, a hood and consoles, two with triangular pediments. The windows are sashes, those above the doorways are tripartite. In the apex of the left gable end is a blind oculus.	II
1 The Avenue and wall 53.90037°N 1.50866°W		Early 19th century	A stone house with a moulded cornice, a hipped stone slate roof, and two storeys. The front facing the road has two bays, and in the right return are three bays. On the front the right bay projects and has a semicircular-arched recess with an impost band, the left bay has a flat roof and contains a doorway with a hood, and to the left is a screen wall with a segmental arch. In the right return are three recessed arches with impost bands, the right bay with a bay window and a Diocletian window above.	II
Quadrant walls, 1 The Avenue and The Vicarage; 53.90000°N 1.50781°W	—	Early 19th century	Approaching the village from the east are quadrant stone walls on each side of The Avenue. The walls have chamfered coping and end in square piers with chamfered caps.	II
Walls, 1–21 The Avenue; 53.90012°N 1.51018°W	—	Early 19th century	The low walls running along the front gardens are in stone with chamfered coping. They are pierced at intervals by steps leading into the gardens, and in places form return walls to the rear.	II
82–88 The Avenue; 53.89976°N 1.51156°W		Early 19th century	A row of seven cottages in stone on a plinth, with a hipped stone slate roof. There are two storeys, and two ranges at right angles with eleven and nine bays. The doorways have fanlights and wedge lintels with false voussoirs, and the windows have projecting sills.	II
Walls, 88–105 The Avenue and The Vicarage; 53.90006°N 1.50945°W	—	Early 19th century	The low walls running along the front gardens are in stone with chamfered coping. They are pierced at intervals by steps leading into the gardens, and in places form return walls to the rear.	II
91–94 The Avenue; 53.89984°N 1.51021°W		Early 19th century	A row of five cottages in stone on a plinth, with quoins, an eaves band, and a hipped stone slate roof. There are two storeys, a double depth plan, and ten bays. The doorways have monolithic jambs and fanlights, and most of the windows are sashes. In the right return is a tall stair window.	II
95, 96/97 and 98 The Avenue; 53.89987°N 1.50978°W		Early 19th century	A row of four, later three, cottages in stone on a plinth, with quoins, an eaves band, and a hipped stone slate roof. There are two storeys, a double depth plan, and eight bays. The doorways have monolithic jambs and fanlights, and most of the windows are sliding sashes.	II
99–101 The Avenue; 53.89990°N 1.50934°W		Early 19th century	A row of three cottages in stone on a plinth, with quoins, an eaves band, and a hipped stone slate roof. There are two storeys, a double depth plan, and nine bays. The doorways have monolithic jambs and fanlights, and the windows have been converted into casements.	II
102–105 The Avenue; 53.89993°N 1.50888°W		Early 19th century	A row of estate houses in stone on a plinth, with a first floor band, an eaves band, and a stone slate roof. There are two storeys, with attics in the wings, a double-depth plan, and a symmetrical front of eight bays, the two outer bays projecting and taller with hipped roofs. In the outer bays are doorways with monolithic jambs, and round-arched recesses containing flat arched windows with voussoirs in the lower floors and segmental-headed windows in the attics. In the middle bays are doorways and windows with monolithic lintels and false voussoirs.	II
67 The Square; 53.90069°N 1.51231°W		Early 19th century	The house, which was extended in about 1947, it is in stone with a stone slate roof. There are two storeys, a double-depth plan, a symmetrical front of three bays, a rear wing, and an extension to the left. The doorway has tie-stone jambs and a flat arch with voussoirs. The windows are sashes, with a single-light window above the doorway and tripartite windows elsewhere.	II
68–72 The Square; 53.90055°N 1.51269°W		Early 19th century	A row of six cottages, two converted into a shop, they are in stone with a hipped stone slate roof. There are two storeys, twelve bays on the front and three on the sides. The outer two bays project as wings with quoins. The doorways have composite jambs and chamfered lintels. Some windows have been altered, some have retained sliding sash windows, and there is an inserted shop window.	II
Harewood Arms public house 53.90134°N 1.51167°W		Early 19th century (probable)	The public house is in stone on a plinth, with a projecting eaves bands, and hipped stone slate roofs. There are two storeys, a front of six bays, the right three bays projecting, and a rear six-bay wing on the left. The doorway on the front has a fanlight, and the windows are sashes with flat arches and voussoirs.	II
High Lodge; 53.89674°N 1.54694°W	—	Early 19th century	The lodge is at a west entrance to the grounds of Harewood House. It is in stone on a plinth, with a bracketed cornice and a hipped stone slate roof. There is a single storey, five bays, and a rear outshut. The middle three bays contain a Tuscan porch, and in each angle is a doorway with a chamfered surround and monolithic jambs. The windows have segmental-arched heads and voussoirs, and contain sliding sashes. At the rear is a moulded eaves cornice.	II
Low Lodge; 53.89810°N 1.54722°W	—	Early 19th century	The lodge is at a west entrance to the grounds of Harewood House. It is in stone on a plinth, with a bracketed eaves cornice and a hipped stone slate roof. There are two storeys, one bay, and flanking recessed single-storey outshuts. The windows have segmental-arched heads, in the ground floor with voussoirs. In each outshut is a doorway with a monolithic lintel and false voussoirs.	II
Mill Farmhouse; 53.90781°N 1.52830°W		Early 19th century	A stone house on a plinth, with oversailing eaves and a hipped roof of Welsh blue slate. There are two storeys and three bays. In the middle bay of the garden front is a canted bay window, and the outer bays contain windows with chamfered surrounds. All the windows have small-paned sashes and hood moulds. In the entrance front and the left return is a Tudor arched doorway with a moulded surround and spandrels, and in the right return is a doorway with a chamfered surround.	II
Stable near Lady Bridge; 53.90114°N 1.54149°W	—	Early 19th century (probable)	The stable, later used for other purposes, is in stone with a stone slate roof, a single storey, and a double-depth plan. On the front facing the lane are three segmental arches with voussoirs, impost blocks, and columns. The doorway to the right has a monolithic lintel.	II
The Old Vicarage and wall 53.89990°N 1.50856°W		Early 19th century	The vicarage, later a private house, is in stone with a moulded cornice, and a hipped stone slate roof. There are two storeys and on the front are two bays. The left bay projects and has a semicircular-arched recess with an impost band, and contains sash windows. The right bay has a flat roof, and contains a doorway with a flat hood, over which is a tripartite window with voussoirs. The left return has five bays, each with an arched recess, the middle bay with an inserted bay window. To the right is a screen wall with a segmental arch.	II
Milestone opposite Spring Gardens Garage; 53.90281°N 1.51190°W		Early to mid 19th century	The milestone is on the east side of Harrogate Road (A61 road). It is in stone with cast iron overlay, and has a triangular section and a rounded top. On the top is "LEEDS & HARROGATE ROAD" and "HAREWOOD", and on the sides are the distances to Leeds, Tadcaster, Wetherby, Harrogate, Boston Spa, and Otley.	II
Milestone near the entrance to Lofthouse Grange; 53.88837°N 1.50899°W		Early to mid 19th century	The milestone is on the east side of Harrogate Road (A61 road). It is in stone with cast iron overlay, and has a triangular section and a rounded top. On the top is "LEEDS & HARROGATE ROAD" and "HAREWOOD", and on the sides are the distances to Leeds, Harewood and Harrogate.	II
Milestone near the entrance to Wikefield Farm; 53.87519°N 1.51247°W		Early to mid 19th century	The milestone is on the southeast side of Harrogate Road (A61 road). It is in stone with cast iron overlay, and has a triangular section and a rounded top. On the top is "LEEDS & HARROGATE ROAD" and "WIKE", and on the sides are the distances to Leeds, Harewood and Harrogate.	II
Milestone to front of 1 Grove Cottages; 53.86244°N 1.52740°W		Early to mid 19th century	The milestone is on the west side of Harrogate Road (A61 road). It is in stone with cast iron overlay, and has a triangular section and a rounded top. On the top is "LEEDS & HARROGATE ROAD" and "WIGTON", and on the sides are the distances to Leeds, Harewood and Harrogate.	II
Milestone near the junction with Weardley Lane; 53.90197°N 1.55104°W		Early to mid 19th century	The milestone is on the south side of Otley Road (A659 road). It is in stone with cast iron overlay, and has a triangular section and a rounded top. On the top is "TADCASTER & OTLEY ROAD" and "WEARDLY", and on the sides are the distances to Otley, Harewood, Wetherby, Boston Spa, and Tadcaster.	II
Milestone near the junction with Harrogate Road; 53.90627°N 1.52763°W		Early to mid 19th century	The milestone is on the south side of Otley Road, (A659 road). It is in stone with cast iron overlay, and has a triangular section and a rounded top. On the top is "TADCASTER & OTLEY ROAD" and "HAREWOOD", and on the sides are the distances to Otley, Harewood, Wetherby, Boston Spa, and Tadcaster.	II
Milestone opposite entrance to New Laithe Farm; 53.90038°N 1.49074°W		Early to mid 19th century.	The milestone is on the north side of Harewood Avenue (A659 road). It is in stone with cast iron overlay, and has a triangular section and a rounded top. On the top is "TADCASTER & OTLEY ROAD" and "HAREWOOD", and on the sides are the distances to Otley, Harewood, Wetherby, Boston Spa, and Tadcaster.	II
Rough Bridge; 53.88974°N 1.52396°W	—	Early to mid 19th century	The bridge in the grounds of Harewood House carries a footpath over Stank Beck. It is in stone, and consists of a single segmental arch with a large boulder parapet. On the north side are three large steps forming a cascade.	II
New Bridge; 53.88588°N 1.52538°W		1837–38	The bridge in the grounds of Harewood House carries the south drive over Stank Beck. It was originally designed by John Carr in about 1769–71, and later rebuilt. The bridge is in stone, and consists of a single segmental arch with moulding above the voussoirs and moulded circles. There is a projecting band, over which is a balustraded parapet with vase-shaped balusters and chamfered coping. The abutments have solid parapets ending in square piers.	II
Dolphin fountain, Harewood House; 53.89666°N 1.52869°W		1847–48	The fountain is in the grounds to the west of the house. The basin is in stone from Rousham Hill, and the sculpture is in freestone. The basin is octagonal with raised moulded edging, and in the centre is a drum carrying a sculpture of three dolphins around a taller shell.	II
South terrace and contents, Harewood House; 53.89641°N 1.52704°W		1847–48	The terrace to the south of the house was designed by Charles Barry and W. A. Nesfield. The walls are in gritstone, the fountain basins are in stone from Rousham Hill, the urns are in Bath stone, and the sculptures are in freestone and lead. The terrace has a rectangular plan on two levels, and balustraded walls on three sides. There is an Imperial staircase from ground to terrace level. The larger lower terrace contains a parterre, in the centre is a sculpture by Astrid Zydower depicting Orpheus, surrounded by a basin with a triangular projection on each side. Other features include flower beds enclosed by coped walls, urns on plinths, fountains with sculptures of mermen blowing shells, carved stone benches, and statues of dancing boys and girls. In the upper terrace are carved stone sphinxes, stone vases, and statues of ladies on plinths.	II*
Guidepost, Slaid Hill; 53.85777°N 1.50054°W		Mid 19th century (probable)	The guidepost at a road junction consists of a stone with a square section carrying two cast iron plates. The plates are inscribed with pointing hands, the plate on the east face indicates the direction to Leeds and Wike, and on the south face to Alwoodley Gates.	II
Temple in the Grove; 53.90002°N 1.53170°W	—	1930s	The temple that forms a view point in the grounds of Harewood House was reconstructed from an earlier building, and is in stone. It consists of a half-open rotunda on a circular two-stepped plinth. There are four columns, the capitals decorated with long feathers, carrying a moulded entablature. At the rear is a semicircular rendered and pebbledashed wall, and at the top is a cornice on Ionic modillions, and a domed lead-clad roof.	II
