= Harewood Castle =

Hall house and courtyard fortress in West Yorkshire, England

Coordinates: 53.9059°N 1.5117°W

Harewood Castle is a 14th-century stone hall house and courtyard fortress, located on the Harewood Estate, Harewood, in West Yorkshire, England (Grid Reference SE 322457). Harewood Castle is a grade I listed building.

== Architecture ==
The castle is laid out as a keep in a rectangular shape with corner towers. The main hall is two storeys high, with a three-storey accommodation wing. It is flanked by four angle towers, one being a plain entrance tower; the chapel is situated over the portcullis chamber. The lower kitchen wing is of four storeys, with a barrel-vaulted basement containing the well. The rectangular tower house on a steep slope is visible for miles around.

== History ==
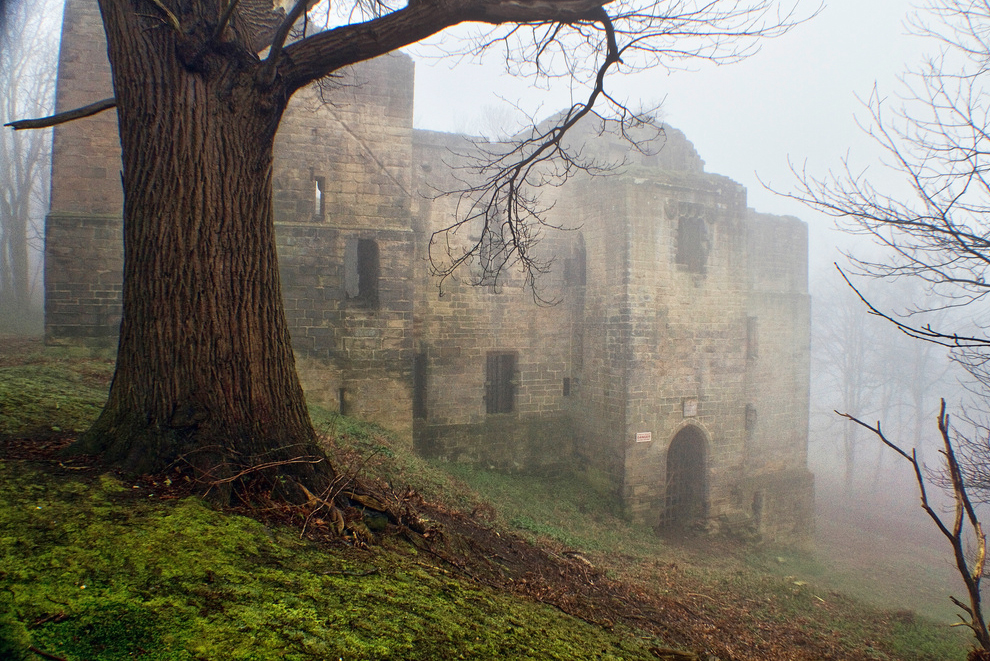
Harewood Castle, as seen from its northeastern facade on a misty morning at dawn.

The castle was founded by the De Lisle family in the 12th century, and then passed to Sir William de Aldeburgh, following his marriage to Elizabeth de Lisle, heiress of Harewood, who was granted a licence to crenellate in 1366.

When the second Baron Aldeburgh died in 1391 without issue, the castle transferred to the Ryther and the Redmayne (Redman) families, into which his two daughters had married.

In 1574, James Ryther and partner William Plompton bought out the Redman family, although Ryther's financial situation must have worsened because he died in London's Fleet Prison in 1595. His son and two daughters sold the castle to Sir William Wentworth of Gawthorpe Hall in 1600 to clear debts; this is probably when Harewood Castle ceased to be a main residence.

The castle was last occupied in the 1630s, and in 1656 it was put up for sale as an 'upstanding source of stone and timber'. The Wentworths sold Harewood and Gawthorpe to Sir John Cutler, 1st Baronet, by which time the castle had probably already been partly dismantled, though Cutler lived there at the end of his life. At Cutler's death in 1693, it passed to his only surviving daughter, Elizabeth, Countess of Radnor and on her death without heir to Cutler's nephew, unmarried Edmund Boulter MP of Boston and Wimpole Hall then to his nephew John Boulter of Gawthorpe and Westminster, who died unmarried in 1738. His executors sold to Henry Lascelles (1690–1753) whose son, Edwin Lascelles, 1st Baron Harewood built Harewood House.

Centuries after it had been abandoned, Harewood Castle remained a landmark, the subject of several paintings in the 1797 by J. M. W. Turner.

== Present ==
Recent times saw decay and weathering take their toll, and the unstable castle was placed on the Buildings at Risk Register by English Heritage. Then, around the year 2000, a £1 million rescue plan was drawn up, funded partly through English Heritage and partly by the Harewood Estate. As of 2008, the restoration project, which involved architects, geologists, structural engineers, ecologists and staff of the Harewood Estate, Historic Property Restoration Ltd and English Heritage, was nearing completion. The castle was taken off the Buildings at Risk Register in that year.

== See also ==
- Grade I listed buildings in West Yorkshire
- Listed buildings in Harewood, West Yorkshire

== Bibliography ==
- Emery, Anthony (1996). Greater medieval houses of England and Wales 1300-1500. Vol. 1, Northern England. Cambridge University Press. ISBN 9780521497237.
