= Baron Aldeburgh =

Baron Aldeburgh was a title in the Peerage of England created by writ on 8 January 1371. It fell into abeyance on the death of the 2nd Baron on 30 August 1391.

== Barons Aldeburgh (1371) ==
- William de Aldeburgh, 1st Baron Aldeburgh (died 1387), m. Elizabeth de L'isle, daughter of Robert, Lord L'isle of Rugemont.
- William de Aldeburgh, 2nd Baron Aldeburgh (died s.p. 1391). The barony of Aldeburgh fell into abeyance in 1371, at the decease of the second baron, between his two sisters as co-heiresses.
1. Elizabeth, m. firstly, Sir Bryan Stapleton of Carleton; secondly m. Richard (or Edward ) Redman.
2. Sybilla, m. William de Ryther of Harewood.
