= Church of the Epiphany, Gipton =

Church of the Epiphany
- Parish Church of the Epiphany
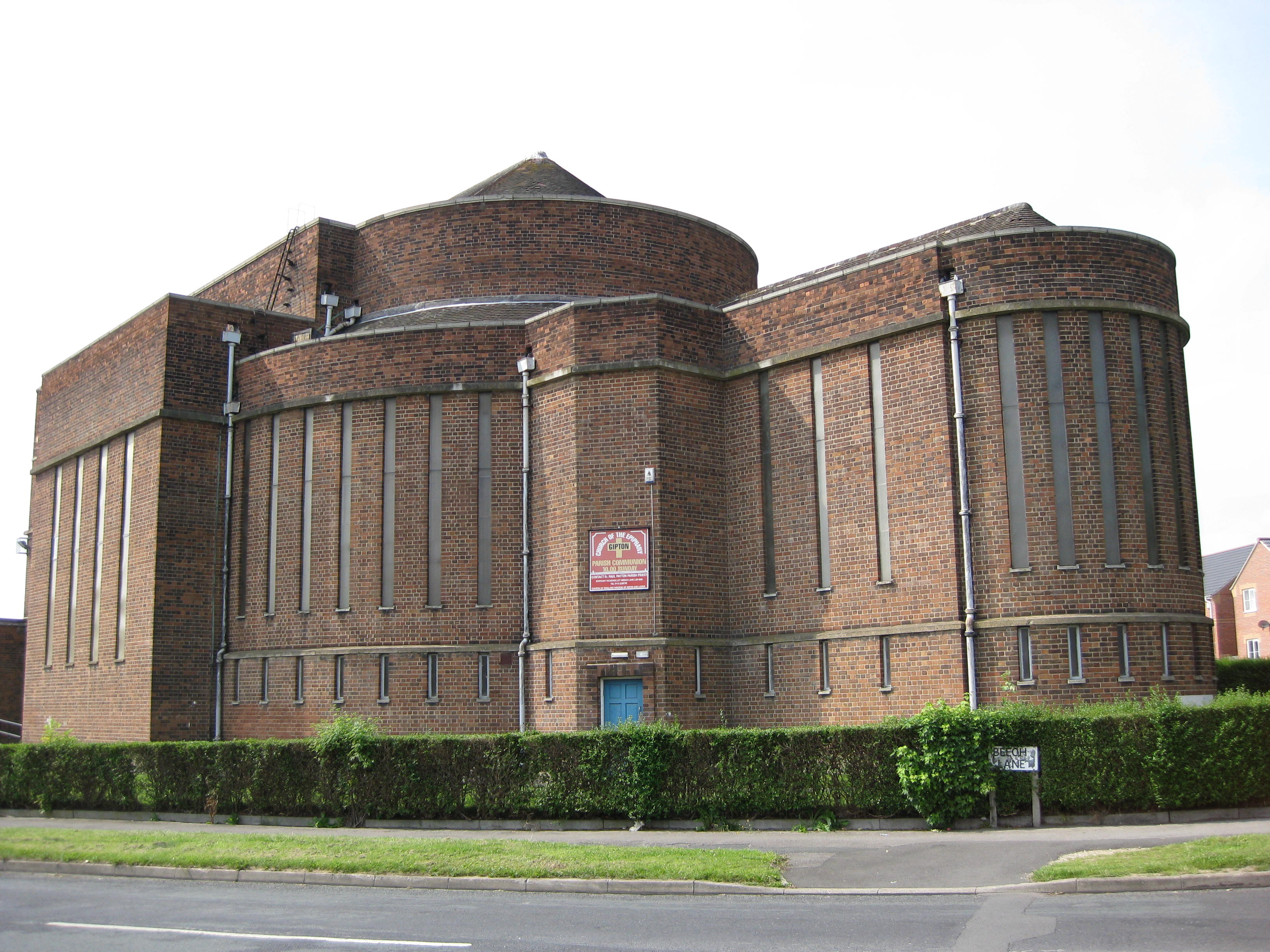
- Church of the Epiphany
- 53°48′47″N 1°29′31″W
- OS grid reference: SE 33564 35305
- Location: Gipton, Leeds
- Country: England
- Denomination: Anglican

History
- Status: Parish church

Architecture
- Architect: Nugent Cachemaille-Day
- Groundbreaking: 1936
- Completed: 1938

Administration
- Province: York
- Diocese: Leeds
- Archdeaconry: Leeds
- Parish: Gipton

The Church of the Epiphany (also known as the Bishop Burroughs Memorial Church of the Epiphany) in Gipton, Leeds, West Yorkshire, England is an active Anglican parish church in the archdeaconry of Leeds and the Diocese of Leeds. The church is Grade I listed.

== History ==
The church was built to serve the then growing housing estate of Gipton. Designed by Nugent Cachemaille-Day and built by Armitage Hodgson of Leeds, groundbreaking began in 1936 and the church opened in 1938. The foundation stone was laid on 12 July 1937 by Elsie Burroughs, the sister of the late Bishop of Ripon in a ceremony attended by the Princess Royal. The church replaced a temporary church which was built in 1936 to accommodate congregations during construction. Originally intended to be dedicated to Saint Edmund, the church opened as the Parish Church of the Epiphany. Alterations were made to the church in 1976. The church was Grade I listed on 25 June 1993.

== Architectural style ==
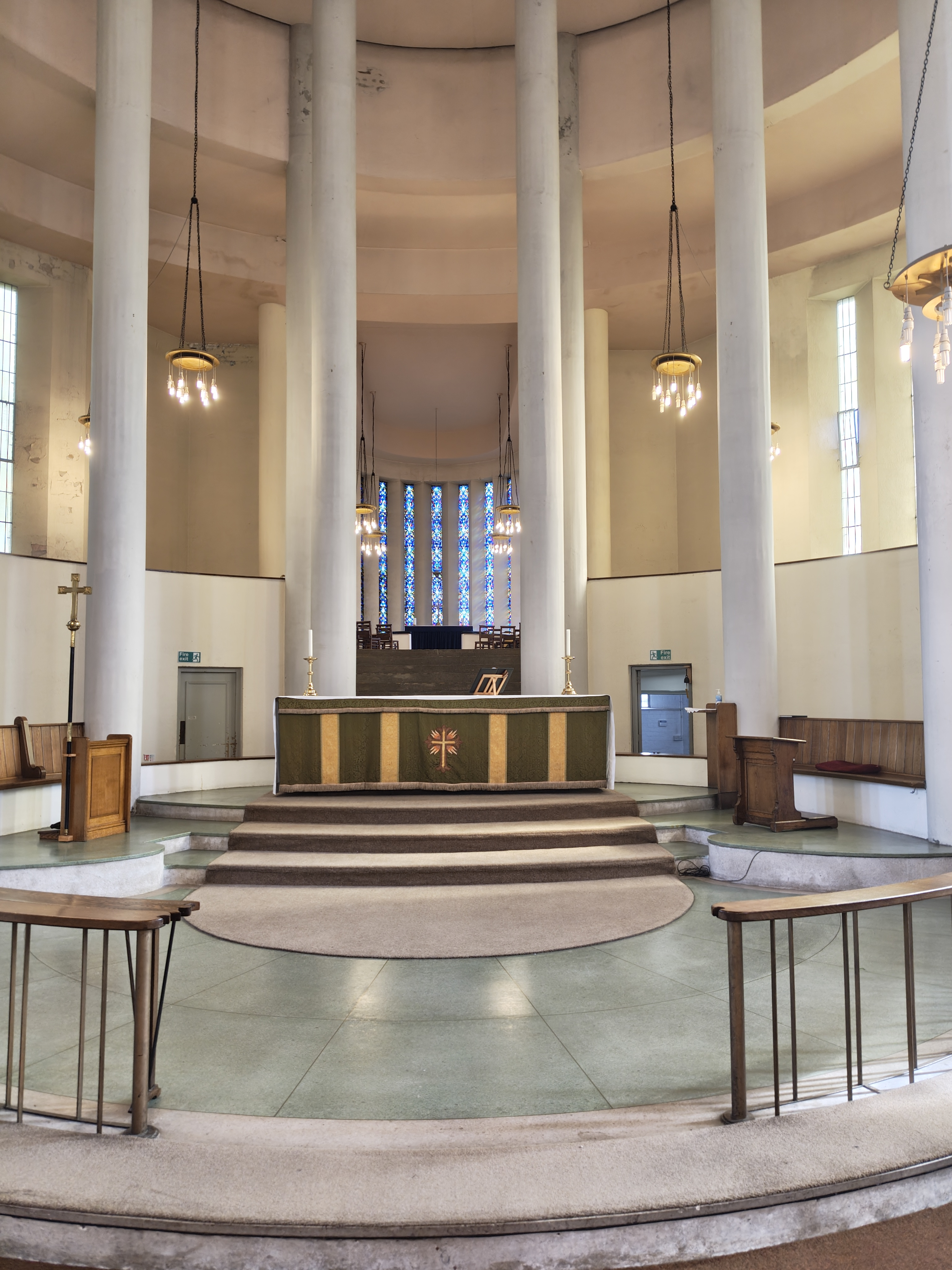
The altar space, with the Lady Chapel visible behind

Like much of the surrounding area the church is of built of red brick in a style fitting with its mid-twentieth century era. Cachmaille-Day's plans were inspired by the new church at Coutances, with an uncluttered open space being his main consideration. The church has a prominent apse on its eastern side. The church is built of reinforced concrete with a red brick cladding and a tiled roof. The nave and chancel are under a single roof span. The church's gable has two buttresses flanked by the bell openings.

== See also ==
- List of places of worship in the City of Leeds
- Grade I listed buildings in West Yorkshire
- Listed buildings in Leeds (Gipton and Harehills Ward)
