= Roger de Mowbray (Scottish sheriff) =

Scottish noble and sheriff

- Noble family: Mowbray family

Sir Roger de Mowbray of Barnbougle, Dalmeny and Inverkeithing, was a Scottish noble. He was Sheriff of Edinburgh and Haddington in 1263.

He was the eldest son of Philip de Mowbray and Galiena filia Waltheof. Roger had a brother Nigel. He was sheriff of Edinburgh and Haddington in 1263. Roger married Christiana.
