= Listed buildings in Leeds (Gipton and Harehills Ward) =

Gipton and Harehills is a ward in the metropolitan borough of the City of Leeds, West Yorkshire, England. It contains eight listed buildings that are recorded in the National Heritage List for England. Of these, one is listed at Grade I, the highest of the three grades, one is at Grade II*, the middle grade, and the others are at Grade II, the lowest grade. The ward contains the suburb of Gipton and the inner-city area of Harehills The listed buildings consist of three churches, a former school, and four buildings at St James' Hospital.

== Key ==
Grade	Criteria
I	Buildings of exceptional interest, sometimes considered to be internationally important
II*	Particularly important buildings of more than special interest
II	Buildings of national importance and special interest

== Buildings ==
Name and location	Photograph	Date	Notes	Grade
Southside building, St James' Hospital; 53.80672°N 1.52056°W		1848	The building is in red brick with stone dressings, a moulded string course, a parapet with pierced panels, and a slate roof. There are three storeys and five unequal bays, with a total of 21 windows. The central and outer bays project, they contain three-storey canted bay windows, flanked by octagonal turrets with ogee domes, and at the top are Dutch gables. In the centre is a doorway with pilasters, and an entablature with finials, and above it is a tall mullioned and transomed stair window. The other windows have architraves.	II
Northside building, St James' Hospital; 53.80820°N 1.51849°W		1858	A workhouse, later a hospital, and converted into a medical museum in 1995. It is in red brick with bands of white brick, stone dressings, a modillion cornice, ornate pierced parapets, Dutch gables with finials, and a slate roof. There are three storeys and a front of 15 bays. The central bay is a square tower with rusticated pilasters, and corner turrets with ogee roofs and large wind vanes. The flanking bays contain three-storey canted bay windows. The doorways have semicircular fanlights, and above the central doorway is a large round-arched window.	II
Chapel, St James' Hospital; 53.80751°N 1.51978°W		1858–61	The chapel is in red brick with stone dressings, decoration in blue and white brick, a moulded cornice, and a slate roof with pedimented gables. There is a cruciform plan, with transepts, an apsidal east end, and a south tower. Steps lead up to the central entrance that has a moulded round arch, attached columns, and paired round-arched doorways. Above is a blind arcade and a rose window. The windows have moulded surrounds and round-arched heads, and in the transepts are circular windows. The tower is square with circular windows, above which is an open three-arched belfry, clock faces, and a broach spire. In the east angle is a circular stair tower with a conical roof.	II
Northwest block, St James' Hospital; 53.80765°N 1.52025°W		1872–74	The block is in red brick with stone dressings on a plinth, with quoins, a modillion cornice, a pierced parapet, and a slate roof. There are two storeys and a front of ten bays, the middle two bays projecting under a Dutch gable. The windows and the doorway have quoined surrounds, and there are two Dutch gables on each return.	II
St Aidan's Church; 53.81268°N 1.52081°W		1891–94	The church is in red brick and terracotta, with dressings in moulded brick and tile, and a tile roof. It consists of a nave and chancel in one unit with a clerestory, north and south aisles, a south vestry, and an apsidal west end. The windows in the aisles and clerestory have round heads, between them are pilasters, and below is a string course. Flanking the apse are turrets with a square section and a circular top stage with louvred windows and a conical roof. To the left is the base of an unbuilt tower, containing a Romanesque-style doorway with a bust, a caption and a motto in the tympanum, and above it is a niche with a statue of St Aidan.	II*
Harehills Middle School; 53.81216°N 1.51683°W		1897	This former school, now used by a social enterprise for meetings, co-working and office space, is in red brick with stone dressings and a slate roof. There are three storeys and a basement, and fronts of eight and two bays. Bays Nos. 2 and 7 project and each contains a doorway with a round-arched porch, paired fluted pilasters, a keystone, and an entablature with recessed panels, a cornice and a pediment. Above it is a tall round-arched stair window, a blind arcade, and a pyramidal roof with a small cupola. The windows have flat or segmental heads, and some are mullioned and transomed. Over the middle two bays are ornate Dutch gables with ball finials, and the outer bays have semicircular pediments with ball finials, and arcaded parapets.	II
Trinity United Reformed Church and Sunday School; 53.81806°N 1.52314°W		1906	The church and Sunday school are in gritstone with slate roofs. The church consists of a nave, short north and south transepts, a south porch, and a truncated southwest tower. The tower has gabled angle buttresses, and a main entrance with a moulded pointed arch and paired attached columns. Above are paired belfry windows, corner pinnacles, and the octagonal base for a third stage. On the west front is a gabled entrance and a tall turret with a gabled pilaster, an octagonal panelled top stage, and a spire with a cross finial. Along the sides of the church are paired lancet windows. The Sunday school to the north has a single storey and two bays, with a gabled porch to the left and a projecting schoolroom on the right.	II
Church of the Epiphany; 53.81299°N 1.49183°W		1936–38	The church is in reinforced concrete on a chamfered concrete plinth, it is clad in brick, and has bands, coped parapets, and a tile roof. The church consists of a nave and chancel under one roof, square transepts, a curved ambulatory at the east end, and a curved Lady chapel projecting from this. At the west end are two projecting single-storey porches. Most of the windows are tall and rectangular.	I
