= Heathcote, Ilkley =

Villa by Edwin Lutyens in West Yorkshire

Coordinates: 53°55′28″N 1°50′11″W

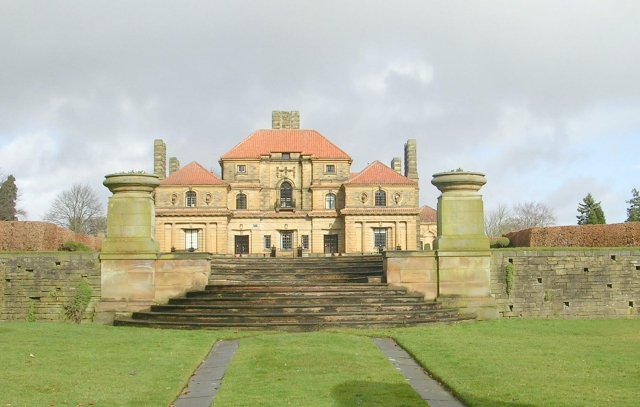
Heathcote's garden front, viewed from the south

Heathcote is a Neoclassical-style villa in Ilkley, West Yorkshire, England. Designed by architect Edwin Lutyens, it was his first comprehensive use of that style, making it the precursor of his later public buildings in Edwardian Baroque style and those of New Delhi. It was completed in 1908.

In December 2014 English Heritage designated it a Grade I listed building, raising it from the Grade II* designation that it received in 1979. In its new listing for Heathcote, English Heritage called it a "pivotal" building in Lutyens's career, and "an imaginative and inventive essay in Mannerism". The gardens are Grade II listed in the National Register of Historic Parks and Gardens.

== House ==
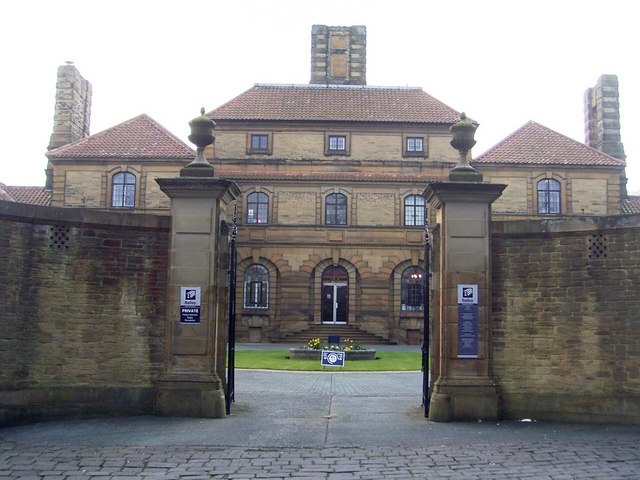
The north, entrance front

In 1906, Lutyens was commissioned by John Thomas Hemingway (1857–1926), a wealthy self-made Bradford wool merchant, and his wife Emma Jane, to replace their existing villa, which was at the lower, southern end of a sloping site, 4 acres (1.6 ha) in extent. Lutyens was given a free rein in the design. He built the new villa at the top of the site, in a size and style intended to dominate the neighbouring villas. Lutyens had already mixed elements of classical architecture into his earlier, vernacular and Neo-Georgian designs, and his correspondence with Herbert Baker displayed a growing enthusiasm for classical architecture. Later, he acknowledged a stylistic debt at Heathcote to the 16th-century Italian architect Michele Sanmicheli. Lutyens has been criticised for using a grand style more suited to a public building than to the Hemingways' dwelling. Lutyens came to call his new style "Wrennaissance", after Christopher Wren.

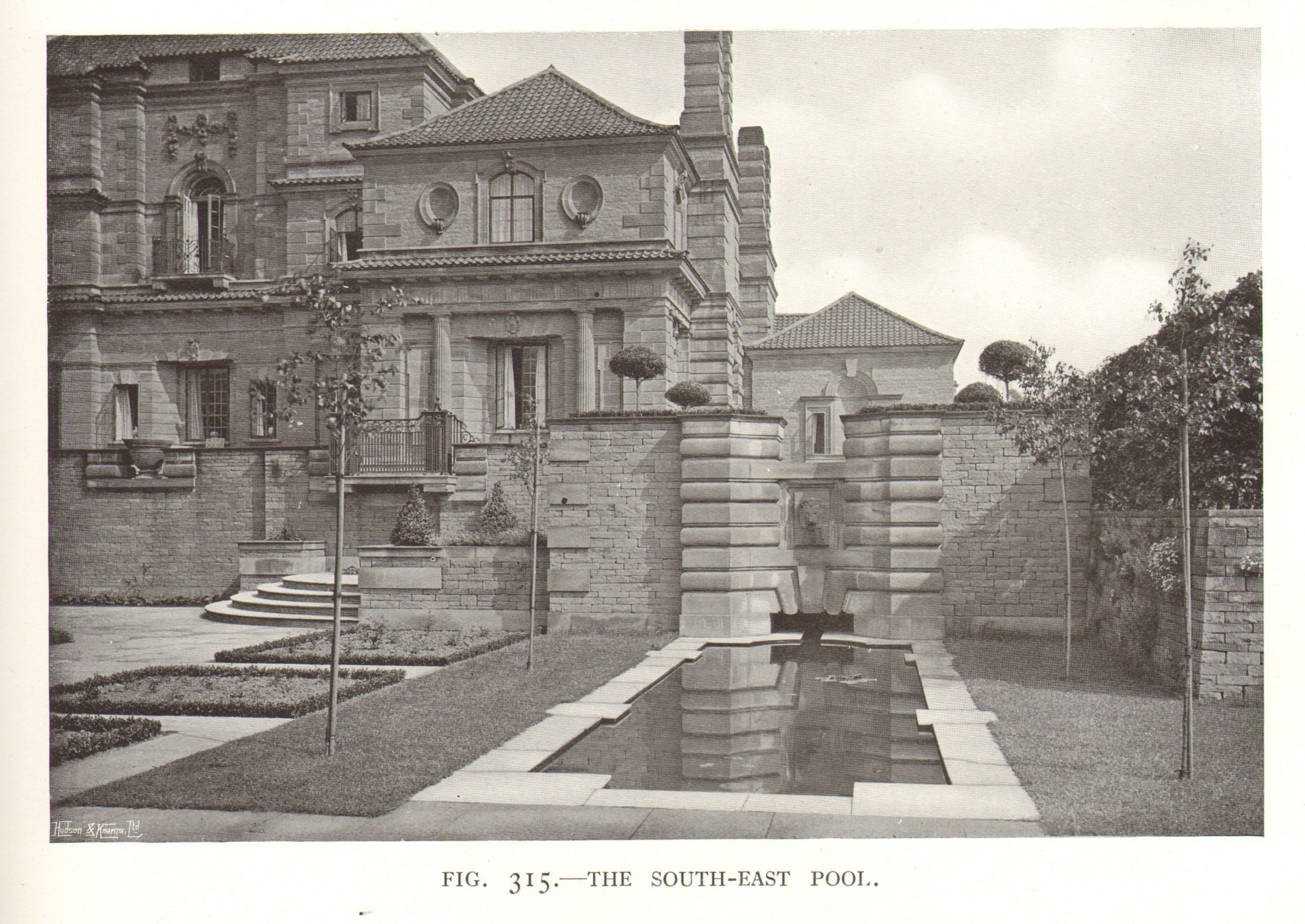
The southeast pool, from Weaver (1913)

The house is built of local ashlar: yellow Guiseley stone decorated with grey stone from Morley, with rustication on the ground floor and on the tall chimneys. The main features of the house and gardens are symmetrical around a north-south axis. English Heritage have identified a compositional influence from the 17th-century French architect François Mansart. The house has a three-storey central block, set back between two flanking two-storey pavilions to east and west, each with an additional one-storey outer wing. Each of these five components has a hip roof, made of red pantiles.

Entry is from King's Road, via a walled entrance court, to a door in the centre of the north elevation. The central hall leads out to a terrace garden giving a view southwards towards Ilkley Moor. The south, garden elevation is more elaborate than the north, with wrought-iron balconies, additional setbacks in the central bay, and Doric pilasters on the flanking pavilions. English Heritage have called the south elevation a "witty reinterpretation" of Michele Sanmicheli's Porta Palio in Verona.

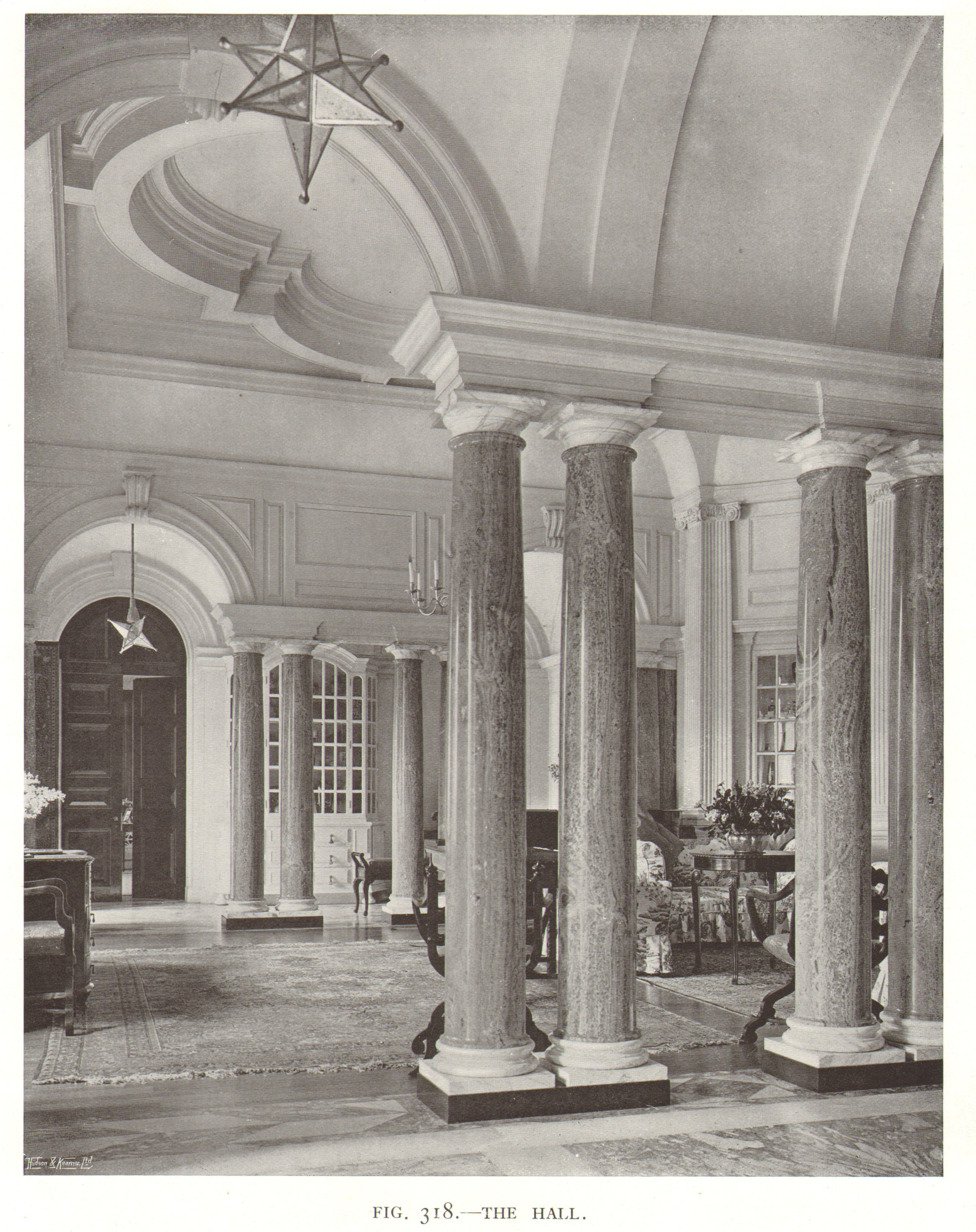
The hall

For the interior design, Lutyens continued the classical theme. The vestibule floor was white marble. The hall had green Siberian marble columns, a black marble staircase and a vivid green carpet. Blue was used for some other surfaces, and for the Lutyens-designed furniture. He also designed star-shaped light fittings. Other interior features designed by Lutyens which remain intact include the fireplaces, cabinets and cupboards.

Emma Jane Hemingway died in the house in 1937. The company NG Bailey used the building as offices from 1958 to 2011. After a planning application to split it into two apartments was unsuccessful, it was converted back into an eight-bedroom house in 2012.

== Gardens ==
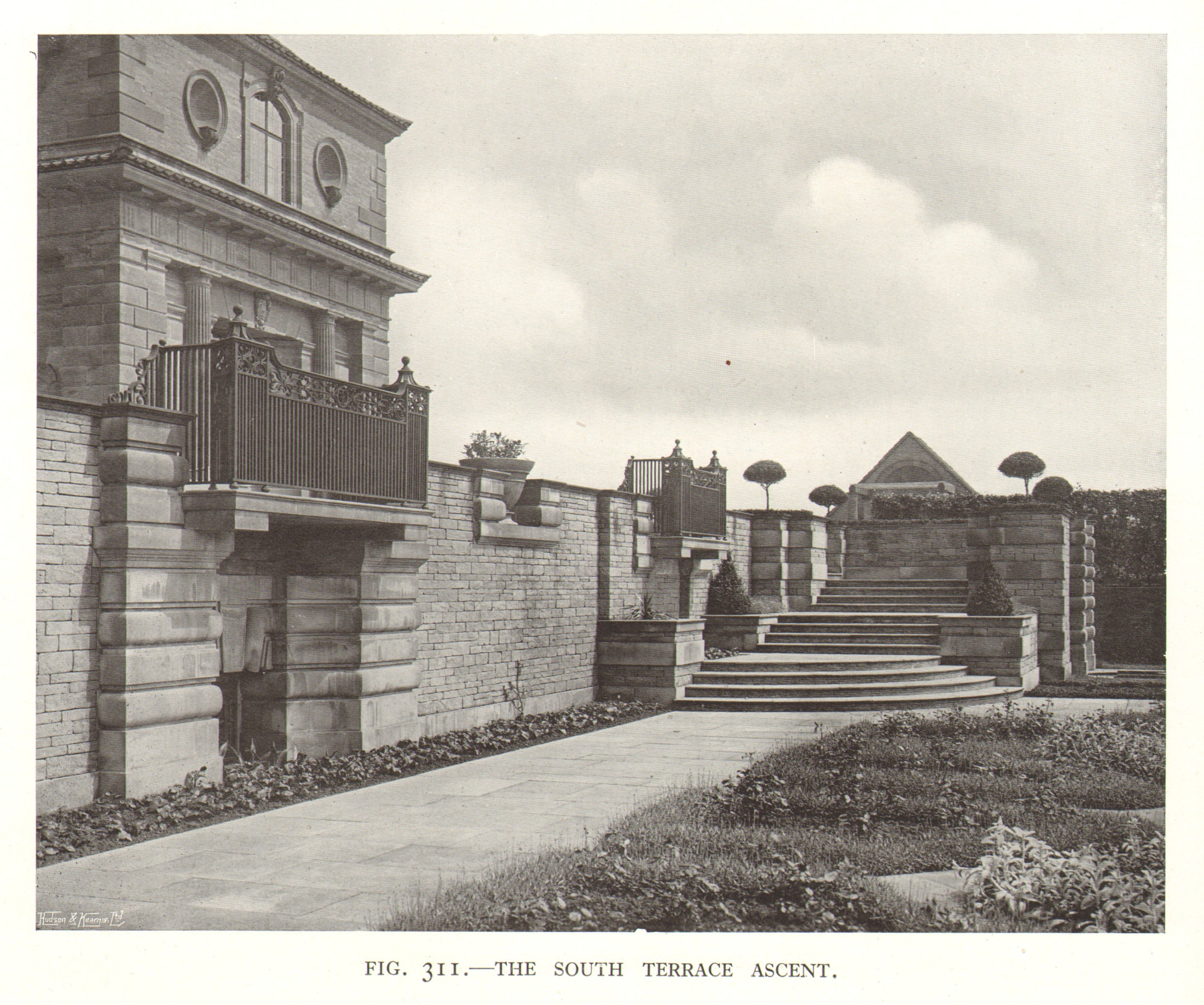
The south terrace

The gardens were laid out by Lutyens, with pools and parterres, and retaining walls for the terracing, including that of the central lawn. The Grade I listing of 12 December 2014 combined numerous garden and courtyard features that were individually Grade II* listed, as well as some outbuildings and a pair of cottages fronting onto King's Road.

The planting of the gardens was by garden designer Gertrude Jekyll.

== See also ==
- Grade I listed buildings in West Yorkshire
- Listed buildings in Ilkley
