= Alexander de St Martin =

Anglo-Scottish noble

- Noble family: St Martin family

Alexander de St Martin, Lord of Athelstaneford, Sheriff of Haddington was an Anglo-Scottish noble.

== Life ==
Alexander was granted the lands of Athelstaneford, from King David I of Scotland in 1153. St Martin may have been in the retinue of Ada de Warenne, David I's wife. Ada granted lands of Alstanesford, Duncanlaw, Baro, and others to Alexander. He granted to the Cistercian nunnery of St. Mary, the lands, tenements and other pertinents of St. Martinsgate and also granted Crumwelstrother to the Abbey of Neubotle. Alexander is known to have been sheriff of Haddington in 1184. He is known to have had two brothers Aldorf and Gilbert.

== Marriage and issue ==
His wife was Basilia and they are known to have had the following issue.

- Ada de St Martin
- Ela de St Martin, married Thomas de Morham.
