= John de Strivelyn =

14th-century Scottish nobleman

Arms of John de Strivelyn: Argent, on a chief gules, three buckles or.

John de Strivelyn (fl. 1327 – 15 August 1378), also called John Stirling or Johannes de Strivelyn, was a medieval Scottish knight in English service.

== Military career ==
Stirling was first mentioned in the aftermath of the Battle of Halidon Hill in 1333. In March 1335 Stirling was appointed commander of a joint Anglo-Scottish force besieging Loch Leven Castle. He was absent around the 10 June, celebrating the feast day of St Margaret, when the defending Scots made a successful sortie. Nevertheless, the castle surrendered by the end of the summer. Afterwards, in September 1335, Stirling was ambushed near Linlithgow, captured and imprisoned in Dumbarton Castle. He was ransomed within a year, was made a banneret of England on Saint John's Eve at Perth and entered King's service.

On 10 October 1335 Stirling signed an indenture contract with King Edward and received Edinburgh Castle and the shrievalty of Lothian on 2 November. As the warden of the Castle, Stirling repeatedly petitioned the king for the pay due to the garrison. In May 1336 he conducted a sortie across the Forth against the Scottish forces besieging Cupar Castle and drove them away. Stirling's service in Edinburgh came to an end in March 1338 when he was captured during a foray.

By the autumn of 1338 Stirling was able to rejoin the king's forces, this time in the Low Countries. He must have stayed with the king until late autumn of 1339 and returned to participate in a winter expedition to Scotland. Next winter, 1341/2, Stirling joined King Edward's campaign in Scotland after the fall of Edinburgh Castle. In October 1342 he transferred to Brittany and fought in the Breton War of Succession until the end of January 1343. On 29 July 1343 Stirling was appointed sheriff of Northumberland but did not take the office due to a bad wound, and was relieved some time after February 1344. From January 1345 until February 1346 he was the keeper of Berwick Castle. In July 1346 Stirling joined King Edward in his expedition to the continent, culminating in the Battle of Crécy and the siege of Calais. In March 1347 he moved back to the Scottish Marches and served until October.

== Military retinue ==
As a knight banneret, Stirling led a personal 'banner' during several campaigns.

Campaign	Dates	Retinue
Low Countries	1338/1339	4 serjeants, 12 archers
Scotland	1340	1 knight, 8 men-at-arms, 10 hobelars
Scotland	1341/1342	2 knights, 21 men-at-arms
Brittany	1342/1343	2 knights, 18 serjeants, 26 archers
France	1346/1347	1 knight, 22 men-at-arms, 26 archers
Scotland	1347	3 knights, 17 men-at-arms, 20 archers

== Family ==
Around 1327 or 1328 John de Strivelyn married Barnaba, daughter of Adam Swinburne of Northumbria. He was succeeded by his daughter Christiana, who married John de Middleton.

His second wife was Jacoba, a co-heiress of Richard de Emeldon.

== Lands held ==
He held the manor of East Swinburne as a tenant, which was disputed at the time. He was succeeded by his daughter Christiana, who married John de Middleton.

On 8 October 1335 King Edward granted Stirling a number of Northumbrian manors forfeited by John de Middleton, including Belsowe (Belsay).

On 12 July 1336 the king granted Stirling several manors (this time in Scotland) redeemable for 200 marks if the Scots retook them. Stirling claimed this annuity from 27 September 1342, receiving a rent from the customs of Newcastle upon Tyne and Hartlepool.

On 19 April 1340 Stirling received two manors, in Berwick and Roxburghshire, forfeited by Margaret de Abernethy, countess of Angus (wife of John Stewart of Bonkyll, earl of Angus (d. 1331) and daughter of Sir Alexander de Abernethy, the fourth Lord of Abernethy).

On 29 May 1343 Stirling received a rent from Aymer de Valence's estates in Yorkshire until the majority of David de Strathbogie, Valence's great-great-nephew. On 20 December the king confirmed Stirling's acquisition of another Yorkshire manor, Faxfleet, partly refunding the 200 mark annuity.

On 22 November 1347 Stirling was granted a few more tenanted lands around Berwick, formerly held by the Morays of Petty.

On 5 August 1352 Stirling bought outright the estate of Newton-by-the-Sea from a Thomas de St. Maur.

In 1361 Stirling received a number of properties in Newcastle as dowry of his second wife Jacoba, a co-heiress of Richard de Emeldon, former mayor of Newcastle killed at Halidon Hill.

Military offices
Preceded by John de Kingston	Keeper of Edinburgh Castle; 1335-1338	Succeeded by Thomas de Rokeby
