= William de Aldeburgh, 1st Baron Aldeburgh =

English nobleman and the builder of Harewood Castle

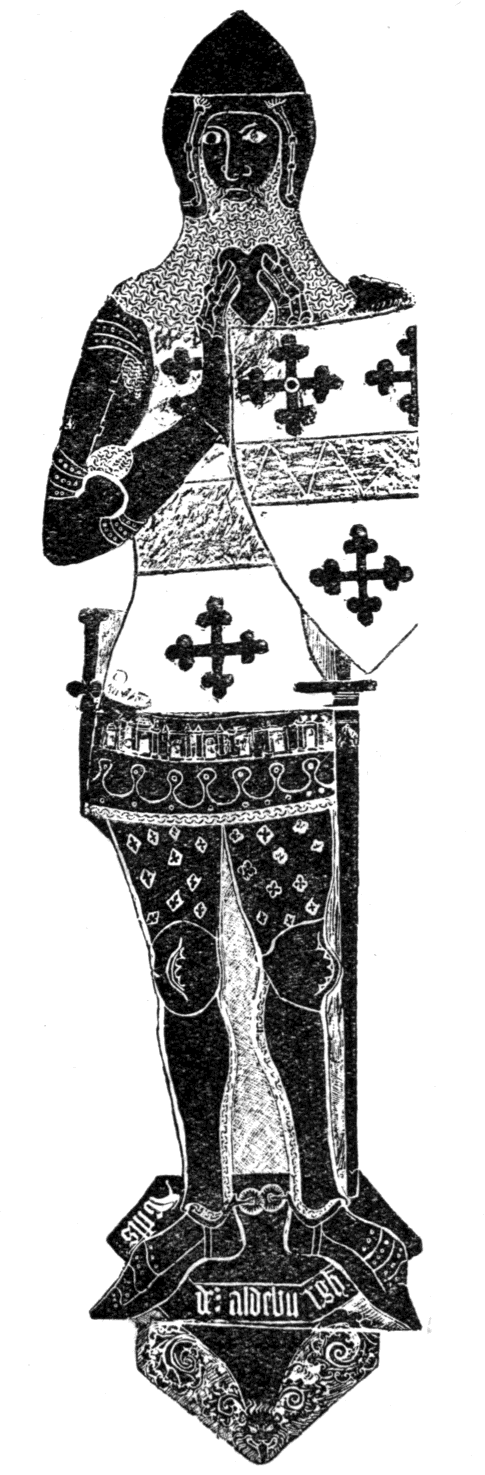
Brass of Sir William de Aldeburgh at Aldborough, Yorkshire

William de Aldeburgh, 1st Baron Aldeburgh (d. 1 October 1387) was a 14th-century English nobleman and the builder of Harewood Castle.

William de Aldeburgh was the son of Ivo de Aldeburgh, a prominent soldier in the Scottish wars. Ivo was appointed Sheriff of the Three Lothians by Edward I in 1305 and warden of Roxburgh Castle under Edward II, and was one of the party sent to negotiate with Robert the Bruce in 1326/7. After Ivo's death in the reign of Edward III, William received royal confirmation to hold a number of castles and manors, in Galloway and Broxmouth, which had been granted to his father by Edward Balliol. Like his father, William was a close ally of Edward Balliol, and was one of the latter's close companions during his exile. Balliol granted him further lands in addition to those already granted to Aldeburgh's father, including the baronies of Kirkanders, Balmaghie, and Kells.

Aldeburgh married Elizabeth, daughter of John, 2nd Baron Lisle. This marriage brought Aldeburgh lands in Yorkshire, including the future site of Harewood Castle. Aldeburgh was granted a licence to crenellate at Harewood in 1366; he demolished the existing structures on the site and built the castle, which still exists (in a ruined state) today. Aldeburgh had three children: William; Elizabeth, who married firstly Sir Bryan Stapylton of Carleton and then Sir William Redman of Levens; and Sybill, who married Sir William Ryther, of Ryther Castle.

Aldeburgh was summoned to Parliament in 1371, as the first Baron Aldeburgh. He was summoned continuously until 1386. He died on 1 October 1387. His son succeeded him as the second baron, but died without issue in 1391, after which the title fell into abeyance among the heirs of the first baron's daughters. Among his descendants was Lionel Duckett, Lord Mayor of London in 1572.

Peerage of England
Preceded by new creation	Baron Aldeburgh; 1371–1387	Succeeded by William Aldeburgh
