= John de Kingston =

English knight

Coat of arms of John de Kingston, Lord of Kingston, Sable, a lion rampant with a forked tail Or.

Sir John de Kingston (Note: Surname also spelt as Kyngeston, Kingeston, Kinggeston and Kinestone.) (died after 1336) Lord of Kingston Bagpuize and Little Sutton was an English knight of the late 12th and early 13th centuries from Berkshire and Wiltshire. He fought in the wars in Wales, Flanders and Scotland. He was a signatory of the Baron's Letter to Pope Boniface VIII in 1301.

== Biography ==
He served in Wales in 1277 under the command of the Earl of Lancaster. Kingston was in Wales in 1282 and in Flanders in 1297 on military service.

As one of King Edward I's leading commanders, he was Governor of Edinburgh Castle from 1298 to 1300 and from 1301 to at least 1305 (possibly as late as 1310). He was a signatory of the Baron's Letter to Pope Boniface VIII in 1301. John and his brother Nicholas were captured during the battle of Bannockburn on 24 June 1314. He was the Sheriff of Somerset from 1315 to 1317.

Kingston was known to be a member of the Earl of Lancaster's baronial revolt, known as the Despenser War, against King Edward II of England and fled abroad after the defeat of the Earl of Lancaster at the battle of Boroughbridge in 1322. He was forfeited and attainted. His lands were restored by 1329–30.

Following Edinburgh Castle's recapture by the English, in 1334 de Kingston was once again given charge of the castle.

He also held the offices of the Sheriff of Edinburgh and Senator of the College of Justice, during part of his lifetime.

He was succeeded by his son Thomas.

== Notes ==
Military offices
Preceded by Walter de Huntercombe	Constable of Edinburgh Castle; 1298-1300	Succeeded by William de Rue
Vacant Castle slighted by Scots in 1314	Constable of Edinburgh Castle; 1334-??	Succeeded by John de Strivelyn
Honorary titles
Preceded by Matthew Furneaux	Sheriff of Somerset and Dorset; 1316	Succeeded by Nicholas Cheyney
