= Wood Lane Hall =

Historic building in West Yorkshire, England

Coordinates: 53.7093°N 1.9358°W

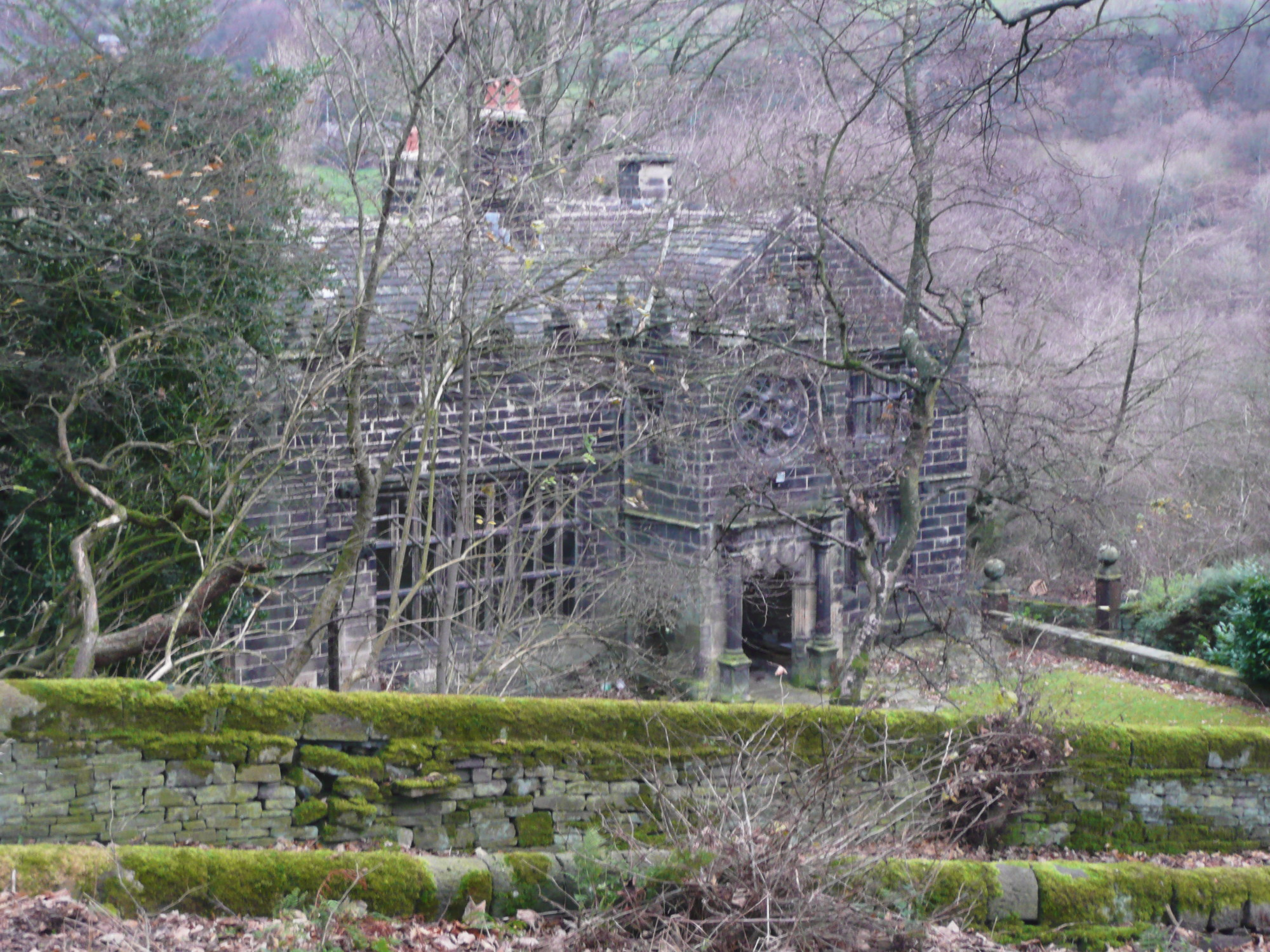
Exterior view

Wood Lane Hall is a Grade I listed building near Sowerby, West Yorkshire, England.

== History ==
The original hall had a timber frame, parts of which were retained when it was rebuilt in the mid-1650s as a prodigy house for yeoman clothier John Dearden. The new building was constructed to an F-shaped floor plan in coursed squared stone with a stone slate roof in two storeys with a cellar and an attic. The frontage has 3 bays of which the outer two are gabled. Over the doorway is the date 1649 and the letters JDED for John and Elizabeth Dearden. Noticeable features are the rose window, embattled parapets and elaborate finials.

The hall remained in the Dearden family for several generations until it was divided into three dwellings in the early twentieth century, with the main hall boarded over to provide extra accommodation upstairs. In 1949 the house was purchased by the Sugden family, owners of a brass foundry in Halifax, who restored the building to its previous condition, opening up the main hall and replacing the panelling, the balustrade, the minstrel gallery and other original features.
