= William de Aldeburgh, 2nd Baron Aldeburgh =

Son of William de Aldeburgh

William Aldeburgh, 2nd Baron Aldeburgh (bef. 1358 – 20 August 1391) was the son of William de Aldeburgh, 1st Baron Aldeburgh.

== Personal life ==
He succeeded to his father's peerage as the 2nd Baron Aldeburgh on 1 April 1388. However, unlike his father, he was never summoned to Parliament.

He married Margaret, widow of Peter Mauley of Mulgrave; she was the daughter of Sir Thomas Sutton.

He died on 20 August 1391 without children and his barony lapsed.

He was buried at the church of the Friars Preachers of York.

Peerage of England
| Preceded by William Aldeburgh | Baron Aldeburgh; 1388–1391 | Extinct |
