= Walter de Huntercombe, 1st Baron Huntercombe =

English military commander during the First War of Scottish Independence

Walter de Huntercombe
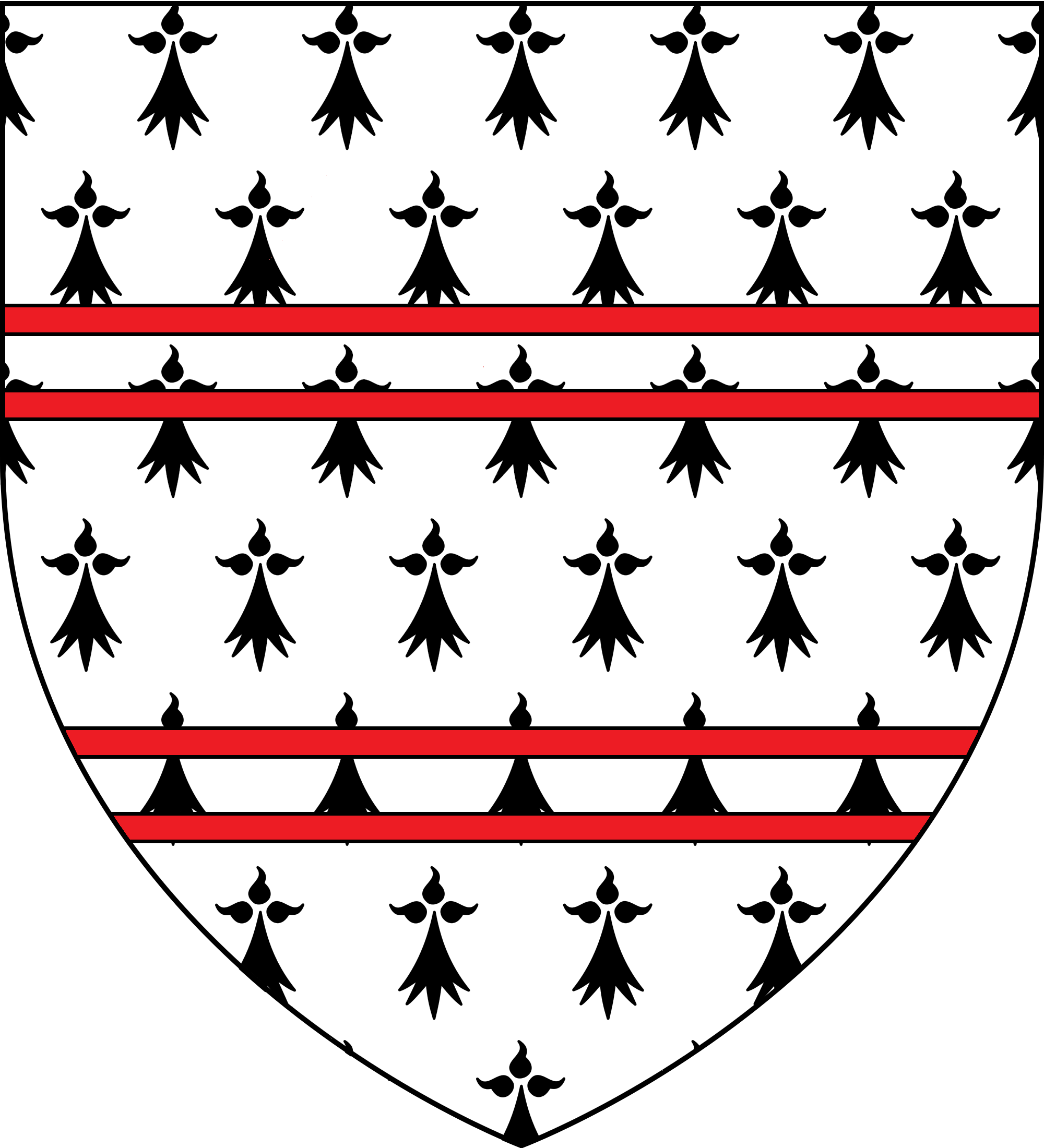
- Born: 1247
- Died: 1313 (aged 65–66)

Walter de Huntercombe, 1st Baron Huntercombe (1247–1313) was an English military commander during the Wars of Scottish Independence and a Governor of Edinburgh Castle.

Around 1283, Huntercombe took part in a military expedition into Wales which was part of the wider Conquest of Wales by Edward I. He was appointed constable at the newly taken Castell y Bere, building a new chamber at the castle during his residence.

The king has committed in like manner to Walter de Huntercomb the castle of Bere, and has granted to him 200 marks yearly for the custody, to be received as above, on condition that he shall have continuously there in garrison at the castle at his cost forty fencible men, of whom fifteen shall be crossbowmen, one chaplain, one artiller, a carpenter, a mason and a smith, and of the others shall be made janitors, watchmen and other ministers of the castle. Order is given to all bailiffs etc (as in preceding).

— Calendar of Welsh Rolls, Edward I 1277-1326, 291.

On 4 June 1290, Huntercombe took possession of the Isle of Man for King Edward I; the island had previously been under the control of the Scots. In early 1293 Edward I ordered Huntercombe to relinquish the island to John Balliol, the King of Scots. and Edward's vassal.

In 1294, Edward summoned Huntercombe to Portsmouth because of the French occupation of the Duchy of Gascony. In June 1295, he was rewarded for his service by being created Baron Huntercombe. His arms were ermine, two bars gemells gules.

== The Wars of Scottish Independence ==
In 1296 and 1297 Huntercombe took part in the Wars of Scottish Independence. By his own testimony, he was at the Capture of Berwick with 20 mailed horses, and at the Battle of Stirling Bridge with 32 horses. In 1298 he was appointed Governor of Edinburgh Castle. Huntercombe was also appointed Sheriff of Edinburgh, Linlithgow and Haddington. He was a signatory of the Baron's Letter to Pope Boniface VIII in 1301. In 1307 he successfully petitioned the King to be released from the duty to pay scutage for the two Scottish wars, in addition to being granted permission to levy scutage from his tenants. Huntercombe argued for these privileges on the basis that he had served in both wars.

Huntercombe died in 1313 without issue, and his barony became extinct.

Peerage of England
New creation	Baron Huntercombe; 1295–1312	Extinct
Military offices
Preceded by Sir Ralph Basset de Drayton	Governor of Edinburgh Castle; 1296–1298	Succeeded by Sir John de Kingston
