= Historic list of senators of the College of Justice =

A list of the senators of the College of Justice in Scotland from its establishment in 1532 to the present day.

== List ==
# signifies Commissioners for the administration of justice under the Commonwealth

Appointed	Name	Title	Predecessor	Left office
27 May 1532	Gavin Dunbar	Archbishop of Glasgow		
27 May 1532	Alexander Myln	Abbot of Cambuskenneth		
27 May 1532	Richard Bothwell	Rector of Eskirk		
27 May 1532	John Dingwell	Provost of Trinity College, Edinburgh		
27 May 1532	Henry White	Rector of Finevin and Dean of Brechin		
27 May 1532	William Gibson	Dean of Restalrig		
27 May 1532	Thomas Hay	Dean of Dunbar		
27 May 1532	Robert Reid	Abbot of Kinloss later Bishop of Orkney		
27 May 1532	George Ker	Provost of Douglas		
27 May 1532	William Scott	Balwearie		7 November 1532 (died in office)
27 May 1532	Sir John Campbell	Lundie		
27 May 1532	Sir James Colville	Easter Wemyss		
27 May 1532	Adam Otterburn	Auldhame		
27 May 1532	Nicolas Crawford	Oxengangs		
27 May 1532	Francis Bothwell			
27 May 1532	James Lawson			
27 May 1532	James Foulis	Collington (Colinton)		
27 June 1532	William Stewart	Bishop of Aberdeen		
16 November 1532	James Beaton	Archbishop of St Andrews		
16 November 1532	George Leslie	Earl of Rothes		
20 November 1532	Thomas Scott	Abbotshall	Balwearie	
21 March 1533	Henry Wemyss	Bishop of Galloway		
19 May 1533	Walter Lindsay	St.John		
15 Nov 1533	Sir Thomas Erskine	Brechin		
17 Nov 1533	George Crichton	Bishop of Dunkeld		
17 Nov 1533	Robert Cairncross	Abbot of Holyrood		
17 Nov 1533	William, Lord Ruthven			
13 Dec 1533	William Preston	Parson of Belton		
8 May 1534	John Waddell	Parson of Flisk		
22 Jun 1535	Arthur Boyce	Chancellor of Brechin		
22 Jun 1535	Thomas Bannatyne	Achinoul		
7 Nov 1537	Robert Galbraith			
13 Nov 1537	Henry Sinclair			
31 Jul 1538	Henry Balnaves	Hall Hill		
10 Dec 1538	John Letham			
2 Mar 1540	Henry Lauder	St. Germain's		
27 Apr 1540	John Sinclair			
27 Apr 1540	William Lamb			
2 Jul 1541	William Keith	Earl Marischal		
2 Jul 1541	George Durie	Abbot of Dunfermline		
2 Jul 1541	Donald Campbell	Abbot of Coupar		
2 Jul 1541	Andrew Durie	Abbot of Melrose		
30 Jan 1542	John Gladstanes			
13 Dec 1543	David Beaton	Lord High Chancellor		
5 Nov 1544	John Hamilton	Archbishop of St Andrews		
5 Nov 1544	John Philp	Abbot of Lindores		
5 Nov 1544	William Colville	Abbot of Culross		
5 Nov 1544	John Rowle	Prior of Pittenweem		
5 Nov 1544	Thomas Wemyss	Unthank		
15 Mar 1546	George Hay	Parson of Renfrew		
25 May 1546	Sir William Hamilton	Sanquhar		
10 Jun 1546	George Gordon	Earl of Huntly		
31 Jul 1546	William Chisholm	Bishop of Dunblane		
4 Jul 1547	Sir Robert Carnegie	Kinnaird		
4 Jul 1547	Sir John Bellenden	Auchinoul		
17 Feb 1548	Abraham Creighton	Provost of Dunglass		
8 Feb 1549	Thomas Marjoribanks	Ratho		
15 Nov 1550	William Baillie of Provand	Lord President		
15 Nov 1550	John Stevenson	Precentor of Glasgow		
14 March 1551	Sir Richard Maitland of Lethington			
15 Jan 1554	James Scott	Provost of Corstorphine		
20 Aug 1554	James Macgill	Rankeilor Nether		
19 Jan 1555	Gavin Hamilton	Abbot of Kilwinning		
16 Aug 1560	Archibald Dunbar	Dean of Moray		
12 Nov 1561	John Spens	Condie		
12 Nov 1561	William Maitland, younger	of Lethington		
12 Nov 1561	Sir James Balfour of Pittendreich	Lord President		
7 Jan 1563	James Douglas	Earl of Morton; Lord High Chancellor		
19 Jan 1564	John Lesley	Parson of Oyne later Bishop of Ross		
14 Jan 1564	Adam Bothwell	Bishop of Orkney		
14 Dec 1564	Robert Maitland, Dean of Aberdeen			
26 Jan 1565	David Chalmers	Ormond		
13 Nov 1565	Archibald Douglas	Parson of Glasgow		
14 Jan 1566	Edward Henryson, LLD			
20 Mar 1566	George Gordon	Earl of Huntly; Lord High Chancellor		
26 Apr 1566	Archibald Craufurd	Parson of Eglishame		
2 Jun 1568	Robert Pitcairn	Commendator of Dunfermline		
2 Jun 1568	John Maitland	Thirlstane		
2 Jun 1568	Archibald Douglas			
30 Sep 1570	John Lord Glamis	Lord High Chancellor		
20 Oct 1570	Thomas McCalzean	Clifton Hall		
Jan 1572	Robert Pont	Provost of Trinity College		
17 Jan 1573	Archibald, Earl of Argyll	Lord High Chancellor		
20 Oct 1573	David Borthwick	Lochill		
9 Jul 1575	James Meldrum	Segie		
21 Oct 1575	William Douglas	Whittinghame		
26 Oct 1575	Alexander Colvill	Abbot of Culross		
11 Jan 1576	Patrick Vans	Barnbarrow		
20 Apr 1577	Thomas Bellenden	Newtyle		
29 Mar 1578	John Stuart, Earl of Atholl	Lord High Chancellor		
25 Nov 1578	William Ruthven, Lord Ruthven			
16 Aug 1579	Colin, Earl of Argyll	Lord High Chancellor		
20 Oct 1579	Alexander Hay	Easter Kennet		
1 Feb 1581	Robert Creighton	Elliock		
5 Jul 1581	John Lindsay	Parson of Menmure		
27 Jun 1582	David MacGill	Cranston Riddell		
10 Dec 1583	James Stewart, Earl of Arran	Lord High Chancellor		
23 May 1584	John Graham	Hallyards		
1 Jul 1584	Sir Lewis Bellenden	Auchinoul		
24 Nov 1584	John Bartane	Dean of Dunkeld		
27 Jan 1586	Alexander Seton	Prior of Pluscardine, later Lord Fyvie, Earl Dunfermline		
9 Feb 1586	Sir Thomas Lyon, Master of Glamis			
6 Mar 1587	James Elphinstone	Innernochtie		
2 Jun 1587	John Colvill	Precentor of Glasgow		
14 Aug 1587	William Melville	Commendator of Tongland		
4 July 1588	Sir John Cockburn	Ormiston		
8 Aug 1590	Archibald Douglas	Whittinghame		
14 Aug 1591	Thomas Bellenden	Newtyle		
11 Nov 1591	Richard Cockburne	Clerkintoun		
26 Nov 1591	Andrew Wemyss	Myrecairnie		
9 Nov 1592	Thomas Hamilton of Drumcairn	later lord President		
2 Jul 1593	John Bothwell	Holyroodhouse		
30 Nov 1594	John Skene	Curriehill		
12 Mar 1595	John Preston	Fenton Barns		
28 May 1597	David MacGill	Cranston Riddell		
2 Dec 1597	Edward Bruce	Kinloss		
2 Mar 1598	Sir David Lindsay	Edzell		
25 Feb 1604	Alexander Hay	Fosterseat		
25 Feb 1604	Sir Lewis Craig	Wright's Lands		
29 May 1607	Thomas Hamilton	Priestfield		
30 Jun 1608	Sir Andrew Hamilton	Redhouse		
6 Jun 1609	Sir William Livingston	Kilsyth		
3 Feb 1610	Sir Alexander Hay	Newton		
16 Jan 1611	William Oliphant	Newton		
12 Jun 1612	Sir James Skene	Curriehill		
2 Nov 1613	Gideon Murray	Elibank		
15 Mar 1617	Sir George Erskine	Innerteil		
5 Jun 1618	John Maitland, Viscount Lauderdale			
9 Nov 1619	Sir John Wemyss	Craigtoun		
10 Jul 1621	Sir Alexander Gibson	Durie		
6 Jun 1622	Thomas Henderson	Chesters		
27 Jul 1622	Sir John Hamilton	Magdalens		
18 Dec 1623	Sir Andrew Fletcher	Innerpeffer		
14 Feb 1626	Sir Robert Spottiswood	New Abbey		
14 Feb 1626	Alexander Seton	Kilcreuch		
14 Feb 1626	Sir George Auchinleck	Balmanno		
14 Feb 1626	Sir Alexander Napier	Laurieston		
14 Feb 1626	Sir Archibald Acheson	Glencairnie		
14 Feb 1626	James Bannatyne	New Hall		
14 Feb 1626	Alexander Morison	Preston Grange		
8 Nov 1627	Sir James Learmonth	Balcomie	Glencairnie ret.	
8 Nov 1627	George Haliburton	Fodderance	Kilsyth dec.	
3 Nov 1629	Sir James Oliphant	Newton	Forsterseat ret.	
3 Nov 1629	Sir James Makgill	Cranston Riddel	Laurieston dec.	
27 Jul 1632	Sir John Hope	Craighall	Newton ret.	
28 Jul 1632	Sir John Scott	Scotstarvet	Preston Grange dec.	
1 Nov 1636	Patrick Nisbet	Eastbank	Newhall dec.	
10 Jan 1637	Sir John Hamilton	Orbieston	Chesters ret.	
1 Mar 1637	Sir William Elphinstone		Redhouse dec.	
6 Jun 1637	Adam Cunningham	Woodhall	Kilcreuch ret.	
6 Mar 1639	Sir James Carmichael	Carmichael		
9 Jul 1639	Sir Alexander Falconer	Halkertoun		
13 Nov 1641	Sir John Leslie	Newton		
13 Nov 1641	Sir Thomas Hope	Kerse		
13 Nov 1641	Sir Archibald Johnston	Warriston		
13 Nov 1641	Sir Adam Hepburn	Humbie		
2 Jul 1646	Sir Alexander Gibson	Durie		
2 Jul 1646	Sir James Lockhart	Lee		
2 Jul 1646	Sir Alexander Belsches	Tofts		
1 Jun 1649	Sir James Hope	Hopetoun		
2 Jun 1649	Robert Bruce	Broomhall		
2 Jun 1649	Alexander Pearson	South Hall		
2 Jun 1649	Robert Macgill	Foord		
8 Jun 1649	Sir William Scott	Clerkintoun		
22 Jun 1649	George Winram	Liberton		
1 Nov 1649	Alexander Brodie	Brodie		
1 Nov 1649	John Dickson	Hartree		
18 May 1652	Sir John Hope	# Craighall		
18 May 1652	Sir William Lockhart	#		
18 May 1652	John Swinton	# Swinton		
18 May 1652	Edward Mosely	#		
18 May 1652	Edward March	#		
18 May 1652	Edward Owen	#		
18 May 1652	George Smyth	#		
Oct 1653	William Laurence	#		
Oct 1653	William Hopkins	#		
Oct 1653	Alexander Pearson	# South Hall		
1 Nov 1654	Henry Goodier	#		
7 Nov 1655	Sir James Learmonth	# Balcomie		
7 Nov 1655	Andrew Ker	#		
1 Jul 1657	James Dalrymple	# Stair		
3 Nov 1657	Sir Archibald Johnston	# Warriston		
3 Dec 1658	Alexander Brodie	# Brodie		
1 Jun 1661	Sir Archibald Primrose	Carrington		
1 Jun 1661	Sir Robert Murray			
1 Jun 1661	Sir George Mackenzie	Tarbat		
1 Jun 1661	Sir Archibald Stirling	Carden		
1 Jun 1661	Sir James Foulis	Colinton		
1 Jun 1661	Sir James Dalrymple	Stair		
1 Jun 1661	Sir Robert Nairne	Strathurd		
1 Jun 1661	Robert Burnet	Crimond		
1 Jun 1661	James Robertson	Bedlay		
1 Jun 1661	John Scougal	Whitekirk		
1 Jun 1661	Andrew Ayton	Kinglassie		
25 Jun 1661	Sir David Nevoy	Nevoy		
4 Jun 1662	Sir James Dundas	Arniston		
18 Jun 1663	John Home	Renton		
4 Nov 1664	Sir John Nisbet	Dirleton		
4 Nov 1664	Sir John Baird	Newbyth		
22 Nov 1665	Sir John Lockhart	Castlehill		
17 Jul 1668	Sir Peter Wedderburn	Gosford		
1 Jun 1670	Charles Maitland	Haltoun		
8 Jun 1671	Sir Thomas Wallace	Craigie		
23 Nov 1671	Sir Andrew Ramsay	Abbotshall		
14 Dec 1671	Sir Richard Maitland	Pittrichie		
4 Mar 1672	Sir Robert Preston	Preston		
14 Jun 1674	Sir David Balfour	Forret		
14 Jun 1674	Sir Thomas Murray	Glendoick		
22 Jun 1676	Sir David Falconer	Newton		
13 Nov 1677	Sir Alexander Seton	Pitmedden		
16 Nov 1677	Sir Roger Hogg	Harcarse		
28 Nov 1679	Sir Andrew Birnie	Saline		
3 Apr 1680	Richard Maitland	Lord Justice Clerk		
8 Jun 1680	Sir George Gordon	Haddo		
1 Nov 1681	Sir Patrick Ogilvie	Boyne		
1 Nov 1681	John Murray	Drumcairne		
5 Jul 1682	Sir George Nicolson	Kemnay		
21 Nov 1682	John Wauchope	Edmonstone		
7 Nov 1683	Sir Thomas Stewart	Blair		
10 November 1683	Sir Patrick Lyon	Carse		
1 January 1686	Sir George Lockhart	Carnwath		
16 February 1687	Alexander Malcolm	Lochore		
28 February 1688	Sir John Dalrymple	Stair		
19 June 1688	Lewis Gordon	Auchintoul		
23 June 1688	Alexander Swinton	Mersington		August 1700
1 November 1689	Sir James Dalrymple, Lord Stair	Lord President		
1 November 1689	Sir John Baird	Newbyth		
1 November 1689	Alexander Swinton	Mersington		August 1700
1 November 1689	Sir Colin Campbell	Aberuchill		
1 November 1689	James Murray	Philiphaugh		
1 November 1689	Robert Dundas	Arniston		
1 November 1689	John Hamilton	Halcraig		
1 November 1689	David Home	Crocerig		
1 November 1689	Sir John Maitland	Ravelrig		
1 November 1689	Sir Robert Sinclair	Stevenson		
1 November 1689	Sir John Lauder	Fountainhall		
1 November 1689	Sir William Anstruther	Anstruther		
1 November 1689	Archibald Hope	Rankeillour		
1 November 1689	James Falconer	Phesdo		
1 November 1689	Robert Hamilton	Presmennan		
5 July 1690	John Hay, Earl of Tweeddale	Lord Chancellor		
23 November 1693	William Douglas, ext	Duke of Queensberry		
23 November 1693	William Johnston, ext	Earl of Annandale		
28 November 1693	Patrick Hume, ext	Lord Polwarth		
19 December 1693	William Hamilton, ext	Duke of Hamilton		
29 December 1693	Sir William Hamilton	Whitelaw	Stevenson, ret	
14 December 1694	Archibald Campbell, ext	Earl of Argyll	Duke of Hamilton, dec	
2 May 1696	Patrick Hume, Lord Polwarth	Lord Chancellor	Tweeddale, suc.	
9 June 1696	James Scougal	Whitehill	Pressmennan, dec	
26 June 1696	James Douglas, ext	Duke of Queensberry	Duke of Queensberry, dec	
7 June 1698	Hew Dalrymple, Lord North Berwick	Lord President	Stair, d	
7 February 1699	Hugh Campbell, ext	Earl of Loudoun	Marchmont, pr	
17 February 1699	Sir John Maxwell	Pollok	Newbyth, d	
25 July 1701	Robert Stewart	Tillicutrie	Mersington, d	
1 November 1702	James Ogilvy, Earl of Seafield	Lord Chancellor	Polwarth, suc	
12 January 1703	Roderick Mackenzie	Prestonhall	Whitehill, dec	
20 June 1704	John Campbell, ext	Duke of Argyll	Duke of Argyll, dec	
17 October 1704	John Hay, 2nd Marquess of Tweeddale	Lord Chancellor	Earl of Seafield, suc	
7 November 1704	Sir Alexander Campbell	Cessnock	Abeuchill, dec	
31 January 1705	Adam Cockburn	Ormiston	Whitelaw, dec	
9 March 1705	James Ogilvie, Earl of Seafield	Lord Chancellor	Tweeddale, suc	
28 June 1705	Sir Gilbert Elliot	Minto	Phesdo, dec	
23 July 1706	Sir Alexander Ogilvy	Forglen	Halcraig	
18 March 1707	James Erskine	Grange	Rankeillour, dec	
6 June 1707	John Murray	Bowhill	Crocerig, dec	
1 June 1709	Dugald Stewart	Blairhall	Tillicutrie, r	
10 June 1709	Sir Francis Grant	Cullen	Philiphaugh, dec	
7 June 1710	Sir James Mackenzie	Royston	Prestonhall, res	
8 November 1710	David Erskine	Dun	Lauderdale, dec	
6 November 1711	Sir William Calderwood	Polton	Anstruther, dec	
7 November 1712	John Murray, ext	Duke of Atholl	Queensberry, dec	
8 November 1712	James Hamilton	Pencaitland	Blairhall, dec	
5 June 1714	James Elphinston	Coupar	Bowhill, dec	
23 November 1714	Sir Andrew Hume	Kimmerghame	Cesnock, ret	
6 June 1718	Sir Walter Pringle	Newhall	Minto, dec	
7 March 1721	John Hay, 4th Marquess of Tweeddale, ext	Marquess of Tweeddale	Annandale, dec	
4 June 1724	Andrew Fletcher	Milton, Justice Clerk	Fountainhall	
4 June 1726	Sir Gilbert Elliot	Minto, Justice Clerk	Cullen, dec	
29 December 1726	Hew Dalrymple	Drummore	Arniston, dec	
10 June 1727	Patrick Campbell	Monzie	Forglen, dec	
1 July 1729	John Pringle	Haining	Pencaitland, dec	
5 June 1730	Alexander Fraser	Strichen	Kimmerghame, dec	
3 November 1732	Patrick Grant	Elchies	Pollock, dec	
3 November 1733	John Sinclair	Murkle	Polton, dec	
11 July 1734	Alexander Leslie	Earl of Leven	Grange, ret	
3 November 1735	Sir James Fergusson	Kilkerran	Ormistoun, dec	
10 June 1737	Robert Dundas	Arniston	Newhall, dec	
21 June 1737	Duncan Forbes of Culloden	Lord President	North Berwick, dec	
23 November 1744	Charles Erskine	Tinwald	Royston, dec	
19 December 1746	Patrick Boyle	Shewalton	Balmerino, dec	
10 September 1748	Robert Dundas of Arniston	Lord President	Culloden, dec	
3 June 1749	James Grahame	Easdale	Arniston, LP	
26 February 1751	George Sinclair	Woodhall	Easdale, dec	
6 February 1752	Henry Home	Kames	Monzie, dec	
2 February 1754	Robert Craigie	Lord President	Arniston, dec	
15 February 1754	Alexander Boswell	Auchinleck	Dun, ret	
14 November 1754	William Grant	Prestongrange	Elchies, dec	
20 November 1754	Robert Pringle	Edgefield	Leven, dec	
28 November 1754	Thomas Hay	Huntingdon	Haining, dec	
5 July 1755	Andrew McDowall	Bankton	Murkle, dec	
24 July 1755	Peter Wedderburn	Chesterhall	Huntingdon, dec	
31 July 1755	George Carre	Nisbet	Drummore, dec	
18 December 1756	George Brown	Coalstoun	Chesterhall, dec	
14 June 1757	Andrew Pringle	Alemore	Kikerran, dec	
14 June 1760	Robert Dundas	Lord President	Craigie, dec	
6 March 1761	James Veitch	Elliock	Bankton	
18 June 1761	James Erskine	Barjarg and Alva	Shewalton, dec	
16 June 1763	John Campbell	Stonefield	Tinwald, dec	
14 June 1764	James Ferguson	Pitfour	Edgefield, dec	
3 July 1764	Francis Gordon	Gardenstone	Woodhall, dec	
4 July 1764	Robert Bruce	Kennet	Prestoungrange, dec	
6 March 1766	Sir David Dalrymple	Hailes	Nisbet, dec	
14 June 1766	Thomas Miller	Barskimming	Minto, dec	
12 February 1767	James Burnett	Monboddo	Milton, dec	
10 March 1775	Alexander Lockhart	Covington	Strichen, dec	
22 February 1776	David Ross	Ankerville	Alemore, dec	
13 December 1776	Robert Macqueen	Braxfield, JC	Coalstoun, dec	
10 July 1777	David Dalrymple	Westhall	Pitfour, dec	
14 November 1782	David Rae	Eskgrove	Auchinleck, dec	
21 December 1782	John Swinton	Swinton	Covington, dec	
6 March 1783	Alexander Murray	Henderland	Kames, dec	
1 July 1784	Alexander Gordon	Rockville	Westhall, dec	
4 March 1786	Sir William Nairne, Lord Dunsinane	Dunsinane	Kennet, dec	
15 January 1788	Thomas Miller	Glenlee, Lord President	Arniston, dec	
17 January 1789	John Maclaurin	Dreghorn	Glenlee, pr	
12 November 1789	Ilay Campbell	Lord President	Glenlee, dec	
7 June 1792	Alexander Abercromby	Abercromby	Rockville, dec	
21 December 1792	William Craig	Craig	Hailes, dec	
14 November 1793	William Baillie	Polkemmet	Elliock	
15 November 1793	David Smythe	Methven	Gardenstone, dec	
16 May 1795	Sir William Miller	Glenlee	Henderland, dec	
11 March 1796	Allan Maconochie	Meadowbank	Abercromby, dec	
17 November 1796	Robert Cullen	Cullen	Alva, dec	
7 February 1797	William Honyman	Armadale	Dreghorn, dec	
16 May 1799	William Macleod Bannatyne	Bannatyne	Swinton, dec	
12 May 1799	Claud Irvine Boswell	Balmuto	Monboddo, dec	
12 May 1799	George Fergusson	Hermand	Braxfield, dec	
6 February 1802	Alexander Fraser Tytler	Woodhouselee	Stonefield, dec	
6 December 1804	Charles Hope	Granton, Lord Justice Clerk	Eskgrove, dec	
14 November 1805	William Robertson	Robertson	Ankerville, dec	
6 September 1806	Robert Blair	Avontoun, Lord President	Succoth, ret	
8 April 1809	Archibald Campbell	Succoth	Dunsinane, ret.	
15 February 1811	David Boyle	Boyle	Cullen, dec	
10 October 1811	Charles Hope, Lord Granton	Lord President	Blair, dec	
19 October 1811	David Boyle	Lord Justice Clerk	Granton, President	
6 September 1811	Robert Craigie	Craigie	Polkemmet, ret	
15 November 1811	David Williamson	Balgray	Woodhouselee	
23 November 1811	Adam Gillies	Gillies	Newton, dec	
1 February 1813	David Monypenny	Pitmilly	Woodhouselee, dec	
14 April 1813	David Cathcart	Alloway	Armadale	
7 September 1813	David Douglas	Reston	Craig, dec	
8 July 1816	James Wolfe Murray	Cringletie	Meadowbank, dec	
24 June 1819	Alexander Maconochie	Meadowbank	Reston, dec	
25 January 1822	William Erskine	Kinnedder	Balmuto, ret	
9 November 1822	Joshua Henry Mackenzie	Mackenzie	Kinnedder, dec	
11 November 1823	John Clerk	Eldin	Bannatyne, ret	
14 January 1825	John Hay Forbes	Medwyn	Succoth, ret	
21 November 1826	George Cranstoun	Corehouse	Hermand, ret	
14 December 1826	Alexander Irving	Newton	Robertson, ret	
17 February 1829	John Fullerton	Fullerton	Eldin, ret	
24 June 1829	Sir James Wellwood Moncreiff	Moncreiff	Alloway, dec.	
6 June 1834	Francis Jeffrey	Jeffrey	Craigie, dec	
15 November 1834	Henry Cockburn	Cockburn	Cringletie, ret	
16 February 1837	John Cunninghame	Cunningham	Balgray, dec	
17 May 1839	Sir John Archibald Murray	Murray	Corehouse, ret	
23 May 1840	James Ivory	Ivory	Glenlee	
16 November 1841	Rt Hon John Hope	Lord Justice Clerk	Boyle	
23 November 1842	Alexander Wood	Wood	Gillies, ret	
22 November 1843	Patrick Robertson	Robertson	Meadowbank, ret	
6 February 1850	Thomas Maitland	Dundrennan	Jeffrey, dec	
23 May 1851	Andrew Rutherfurd	Rutherfurd		
23 May 1851	Duncan McNeill	Colonsay		
27 June 1851	John Cowan	Cowan		
22 May 1852	Adam Anderson	Anderson		
16 November 1852	John Marshall	Curriehill		
1 June 1853	Sir George Deas	Deas	Cunninghame	26 February 1885
19 November 1853	Robert Handyside	Handyside		
7 December 1853	Hercules James Robertson	Benholme		
13 May 1854	Charles Neaves	Neaves	Cockburn, dec	
18 January 1855	James Crawfurd	Ardmillan		
8 February 1855	Thomas Mackenzie	Mackenzie		
13 May 1858	William Penney	Kinloch		
14 July 1858	John Inglis	Glencorse		
13 May 1859	Charles Baillie	Jerviswoode		
5 February 1862	Robert MacFarlane	Ormidale		
13 November 1862	Edward Francis Maitland	Barcaple		
13 January 1865	David Mure	Mure		
2 March 1867	George Patton	Glenalmond		
20 October 1868	George Dundas	Manor		
19 October 1869	James Moncreiff	Moncreiff		
1 February 1870	Adam Gifford	Gifford		
18 March 1870	Donald Mackenzie	Mackenzie		
11 December 1872	Alexander Burns Shand	Shand		
3 March 1874	George Young	Young		
17 July 1874	John Millar	Craighill		
31 October 1874	John Marshall	Curriehill		
2 November 1875	Andrew Rutherfurd Clark	Rutherfurd Clark		
6 December 1876	James Adam	Adam		
12 May 1880	Robert Lee	Lee		
15 February 1881	Patrick Fraser	Fraser		
18 October 1881	John McLaren	McLaren		
10 January 1882	Alexander Smith Kinnear	Kinnear		
27 February 1885	John Trayner	Trayner	Deas	
30 October 1888	Sir John Hay Athole Macdonald	Kingsburgh		
6 November 1888	Henry James Moncreiff	Wellwood		
14 May 1889	William Mackintosh	Kyllachy		
7 November 1889	William Ellis Gloag	Kincairney		
28 October 1890	Moir Tod Stormonth Darling	Stormonth Darling		
25 November 1890	Alexander Low	Low		
16 October 1891	James Patrick Bannerman Robertson (Note: Created as a Lord of Appeal in Ordinary in 1899 as Baron Robertson.)	Robertson		
12 May 1896	Sir Charles John Pearson	Pearson		
28 November 1899	John Blair Balfour	Blair Balfour		
11 January 1905	Andrew Jameson	Ardwall		
17 February 1905	David Dundas	Dundas		
21 February 1905	Andrew Graham Murray	Dunedin		
19 May 1905	Henry Johnston	Johnston		
17 October 1905	Edward Theodore Salvesen	Salvesen		
8 December 1905	Charles Kincaid Mackenzie	Mackenzie	Adam	
22 January 1907	Charles John Guthrie	Guthrie		
15 October 1908	William Campbell	Skerrington		
20 July 1909	William James Cullen	Cullen	Pearson	
18 May 1910	Arthur Dewar	Dewar	McLaren	
22 October 1910	George Lewis MacFarlane	Ormidale	Low	
12 December 1911	William Hunter	Hunter	Ardwall	1936, retired
17 October 1913	Alexander Ure	Strathclyde		
4 November 1913	Andrew Macbeth Anderson	Anderson	Kinnear	
1 July 1915	Charles Scott Dickson	Scott Dickson		
16 October 1917	Sir Christopher Nicholson Johnston	Sands		
1 November 1918	Robert Francis Leslie Blackburn	Blackburn	Johnston	
12 May 1920	James Avon Clyde	Clyde	Strathclyde	
8 June 1920	John Wilson	Ashmore	Guthrie	
8 March 1922	Thomas Brash Morison	Morison		
4 July 1922	Andrew Henderson Briggs Constable	Constable	Salvesen	
19 October 1922	Robert Munro	Alness		
14 November 1922	Charles David Murray	Murray		
5 January 1926	David Pinkerton Fleming	Fleming	Cullen	
5 January 1926	Alexander Moncrieff	Moncrieff	Skerrington	
30 May 1928	Alexander Morrice Mackay	Mackay	Ashmore	
8 January 1929	James Campbell Pitman	Pitman	Constable	
14 February 1933	John Lean Wark	Wark	Ormidale	
17 October 1933	Craigie Mason Aitchison	Aitchison	Alness	
12 May 1934	John Francis Carmont	Carmont		
7 May 1935	Wilfrid Guild Normand (Note: Created as a Lord of Appeal in Ordinary in 1947 as Baron Normand.)	Normand	Clyde	
12 November 1935	Douglas Jamieson	Jamieson	Blackburn	
11 February 1936	Thomas Graham Robertson	Robertson	Hunter	
24 June 1936	James Stevenson	Stevenson	Anderson, deceased	
7 July 1936	Albert Russell	Russell	Murray	
4 June 1937	James Keith (Note: Created as a Lord of Appeal in Ordinary in 1953 as Baron Keith of Avonholm.)	Keith	Morison, ret	
26 May 1939	William Donald Patrick	Patrick	Pitman, res	
13 June 1941	Thomas Mackay Cooper	Cooper		
15 June 1944	Charles Mackintosh	Mackintosh	Wark, dec	
24 November 1944	James Gordon McIntyre	Sorn	Robertson, dec	
3 July 1945	Sir Thomas David King Murray	Birnam	Fleming, dec	
4 March 1947	Daniel Patterson Blades	Blades	Moncrieff	
14 October 1947	George Reid Thomson.	Thomson		
15 October 1948	James Frederick Strachan	Strachan	Stevenson, res	
25 January 1949	Henry Wallace Guthrie	Guthrie		
20 June 1952	Laurence Hill Watson	Hill Watson		
10 November 1953	James Frederick Gordon Thomson	Migdale		
2 February 1954	John Wheatley (Note: Created as a Life Peer in 1970 as Baron Wheatley.)	Wheatley		
16 February 1954	James Walker	Walker		
11 January 1955	James Latham McDiarmid Clyde	Clyde	Cooper	
5 July 1955	Sir John Cameron	Cameron		
2 October 1957	Christopher William Graham Guest (Note: Created as a Lord of Appeal in Ordinary in 1961 as Baron Guest.)	Guest		
5 May 1959	Charles James Dalrymple Shaw (Note: Created as a Lord of Appeal in Ordinary in 1971 as Baron Kilbrandon.)	Kilbrandon		
3 May 1960	William Rankine Milligan	Milligan		
11 January 1961	Douglas Harold Johnston	Johnston		31 December 1978, ret
6 October 1961	John Oswald Mair Hunter	Hunter		
2 October 1962	William Grant	Grant	Thomson	
3 December 1963	Manuel Kissen	Kissen	Sorn	May 1981, dec
7 January 1964	Walter Ian Reid Fraser (Note: Created as a Lord of Appeal in Ordinary in 1975 as Fraser of Tullybelton.)	Fraser	Patrick	
6 October 1964	Ian Hamilton Shearer	Avonside	Mackintosh	
15 July 1965	James Graham Leechman	Leechman	Kilbrandon	
25 November 1965	Alexander Thomson	Thomson	Carmont	
6 October 1966	Ian MacDonald Robertson	Robertson		
27 October 1967	Gordon Stott	Stott		
30 April 1970	George Carlyle Emslie (Note: Created as a Life Peer in 1980 as Baron Emslie.)	Emslie	Guthrie	
6 October 1971	Alastair McPherson Johnston	Dunpark		
6 October 1971	Henry Shanks Keith (Note: Created as a Lord of Appeal in Ordinary in 1977 as Baron Keith of Kinkel.)	Keith		
1 June 1972	William Robertson Grieve	Grieve		
2 June 1972	Alexander John Mackenzie Stuart (Note: Created as a Life Peer in 1988 as Baron Mackenzie-Stuart.)	Mackenzie Stuart		
9 November 1972	David William Robert Brand	Brand	Mackenzie-Stuart	
22 December 1972	Robert Smith Johnston	Kincraig	Wheatley	
9 January 1973	Peter Maxwell	Maxwell		
21 November 1973	Robert Howat McDonald	McDonald		
21 February 1974	Norman Russell Wylie	Wylie		
14 January 1975	Ewan George Francis Stewart	Stewart		
17 November 1976	Donald MacArthur Ross	Ross		
21 December 1976	William Stewart	Allanbridge		
10 June 1977	William Lorn Kerr Cowie	Cowie		
19 January 1979	Charles Eliot Jauncey (Note: Created as a Lord of Appeal in Ordinary in 1988 as Baron Jauncey of Tullichettle.)	Jauncey of Tullichettle	Johnston, ret	
1979	Ronald King Murray	Murray		
1981	Ian MacDonald	Mayfield	Kissen, dec	
1983	Charles Kemp Davidson	Davidson		
1984	James Peter Hymers Mackay (Note: Created as a Life Peer in 1979 as Baron Mackay of Clashfern, became a Lord of Appeal in Ordinary in 1985, then became Lord High Chancellor of Great Britain in 1987.)	Clashfern		
1984	John Herbert McCluskey (Note: Created as a Life Peer in 1976 as Baron McCluskey.)	McCluskey		
1985	Alastair Malcolm Morison	Morison		
1985	Ranald Ian Sutherland	Sutherland		
1985	David Bruce Weir	Weir		
1985	James John Clyde (Note: Created as a Lord of Appeal in Ordinary in 1996 as Baron Clyde.)	Clyde		
1986	William Douglas Cullen (Note: Created as a Life Peer in 2003 as Baron Cullen of Whitekirk.)	Cullen of Whitekirk		
1986	William David Prosser	Prosser		
1987	Ian Candlish Kirkwood	Kirkwood		
1987	John Taylor Cameron	Coulsfield		
1988	James George Milligan	Milligan		
1988	John Murray	Dervaird		
1989	James Arthur David Hope (Note: Created as a Life Peer in 1995 as Baron Hope of Craighead, became a Lord of Appeal in Ordinary in 1996, then became a Justice of the Supreme Court in 2009.)	Hope of Craighead		
1989	Philip Isaac Caplan	Caplan		
1989	Kenneth Cameron, Baron Cameron of Lochbroom (Note: Created as a Life Peer in 1984 as Baron Cameron of Lochbroom.)	Cameron		
1990	Michael Stewart Rae Bruce	Marnoch		
1990	Ranald Norman Munro MacLean	MacLean		
1990	George William Penrose	Penrose		
1990	Kenneth Hilton Osborne	Osborne		
1992	John Alastair Cameron	Abernethy		
1994	Alan Charles Macpherson Johnston	Johnston		
1994	Brian Gill	Gill		
1995	Arthur Campbell Hamilton	Hamilton		
1995	Alan Ferguson Rodger (Note: Created as a Life Peer in 1992 as Baron Rodger of Earlsferry, became a Lord of Appeal in Ordinary in 2001, then became a Justice of the Supreme Court in 2009.)	Rodger of Earlsferry		
1995	Thomas Cordner Dawson	Dawson		
1995	Donald James Dobbie Macfadyen	Macfadyen		
1996	Hazel Josephine Cosgrove	Cosgrove		March 2006, retired
1996	William Austin Nimmo Smith	Nimmo Smith		
1996	Alexander Morrison Philip	Philip		
1997	Derek Robert Alexander Emslie	Kingarth		
1997	Iain Bonomy	Bonomy		
1997	Ronald David Mackay	Eassie		
1998	Robert John Reed	Reed		February 2012, appointed as Justice of Supreme Court
2000	John Francis Wheatley	Wheatley		
2000	Ann Paton	Paton		
2000	Colin John McLean Sutherland	Carloway		
2000	Matthew Gerard Clarke	Clarke		
17 February 2000	Andrew Rutherford Hardie (Note: Created as a Life Peer in 1997 as Baron Hardie.)	Hardie		
2000	Donald Sage Mackay (Note: Created as a Life Peer in 1995 as Baron Mackay of Drumadoon.)	Mackay of Drumadoon		
2000	Robin Gilmour McEwan	McEwan		
2001	Duncan Adam Young Menzies	Menzies		
2001	James Edward Drummond Young	Drummond Young		
2001	George Nigel Hannington Emslie	Emslie	Prosser	
2001	Anne Smith	Smith		
2002	Philip Hope Brodie	Brodie	Coulsfield	
2003	Alastair Peter Campbell	Bracadale		2017
2005	Leeona June Dorrian	Dorrian		
2005	Patrick Stewart Hodge	Hodge		October 2013, appointed as Justice of Supreme Court
2005	Iain Duncan Macphail	Macphail		21 October 2009, deceased
2005	Angus James Scott Glennie	Glennie		December 2020, retired
2005	Alexander Featherstonhaugh Wylie	Kinclaven		April 2020, retired
January 2006	Lynda Margaret Clark (Note: Created as a Life Peer in 2005 as Baroness Clark of Calton.)	Clark of Calton		
February 2006	Alan Turnbull	Turnbull		
2006	Sidney Neil Brailsford	Brailsford		
April 2006	Roderick Francis Macdonald	Uist		1 February 2021
2007	Colin Malcolm Campbell	Malcolm		
2007	Hugh Matthews	Matthews		
March 2008	Stephen Errol Woolman	Woolman		
5 November 2008	Paul Benedict Cullen	Pentland		
5 November 2008	Iain Alexander Scott Peebles	Bannatyne		
5 November 2008	Valerie Elizabeth Stacey	Stacey		
April 2010	Colin Jack Tyre	Tyre		
April 2010	Raymond Doherty	Docherty		
November 2010	Angus Stewart	Stewart		14 December 2016
26 June 2012	Colin Boyd (Note: Created as a Life Peer in 2006 as Baron Boyd of Duncansby.)	Boyd of Duncansby		
11 July 2012	Michael Scott Jones	Jones		13 March 2016, deceased
12 July 2012	David Spencer Burns	Burns		
2 November 2012	Margaret Elizabeth Scott	Scott		
6 February 2013	Morag B. Wise	Wise		
15 February 2013	Iain Armstrong	Armstrong		
14 January 2014	Rita Rae	Rae		18 June 2020
11 March 2014	Sarah Wolffe	Wolffe		
17 May 2016	John Beckett	Beckett		
24 May 2016	Alistair Clark	Clark		
31 May 2016	Andrew Stewart	Ericht		
30 June 2016	Ailsa Carmichael	Carmichael		
15 December 2016	Frank Mulholland	Mulholland	Stewart	

== Gallery ==
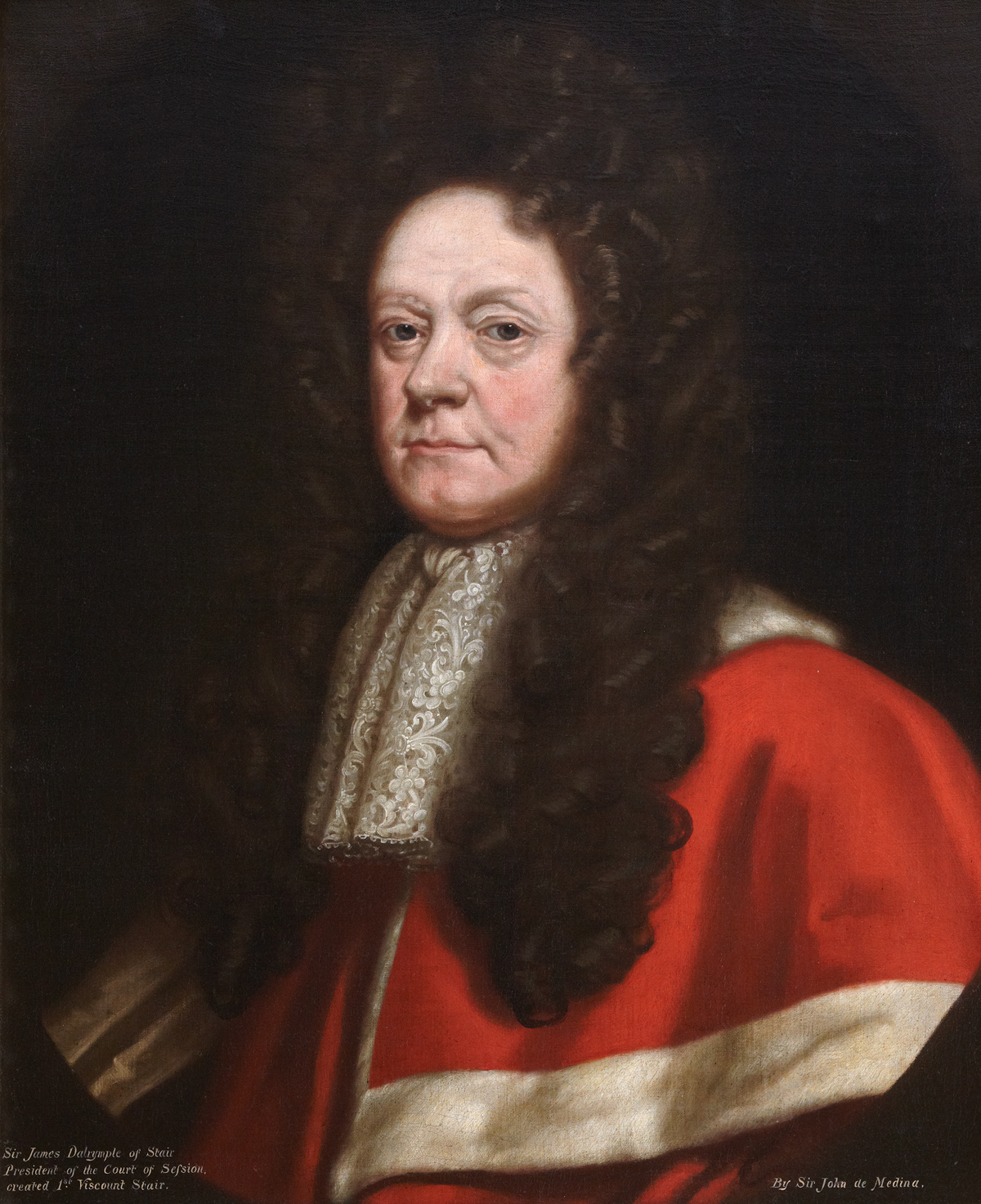
Lord President Stair

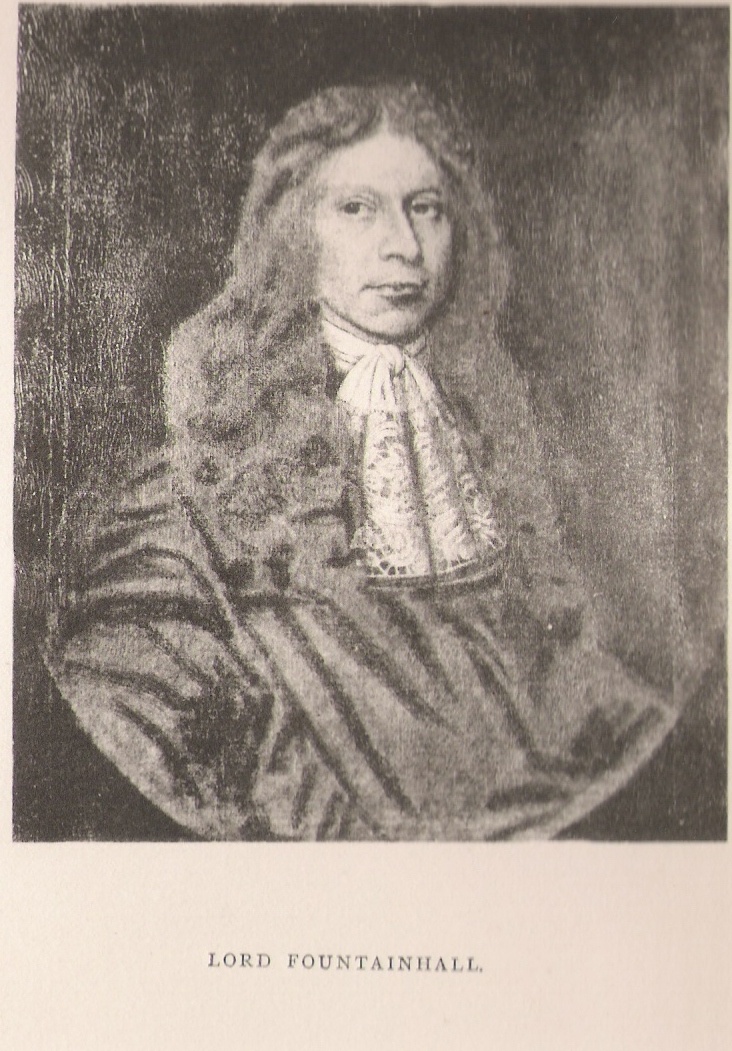
Lord Fountainhall

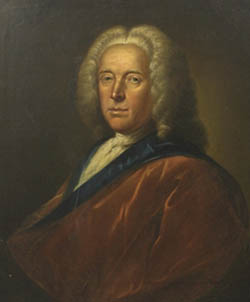
Lord Grange

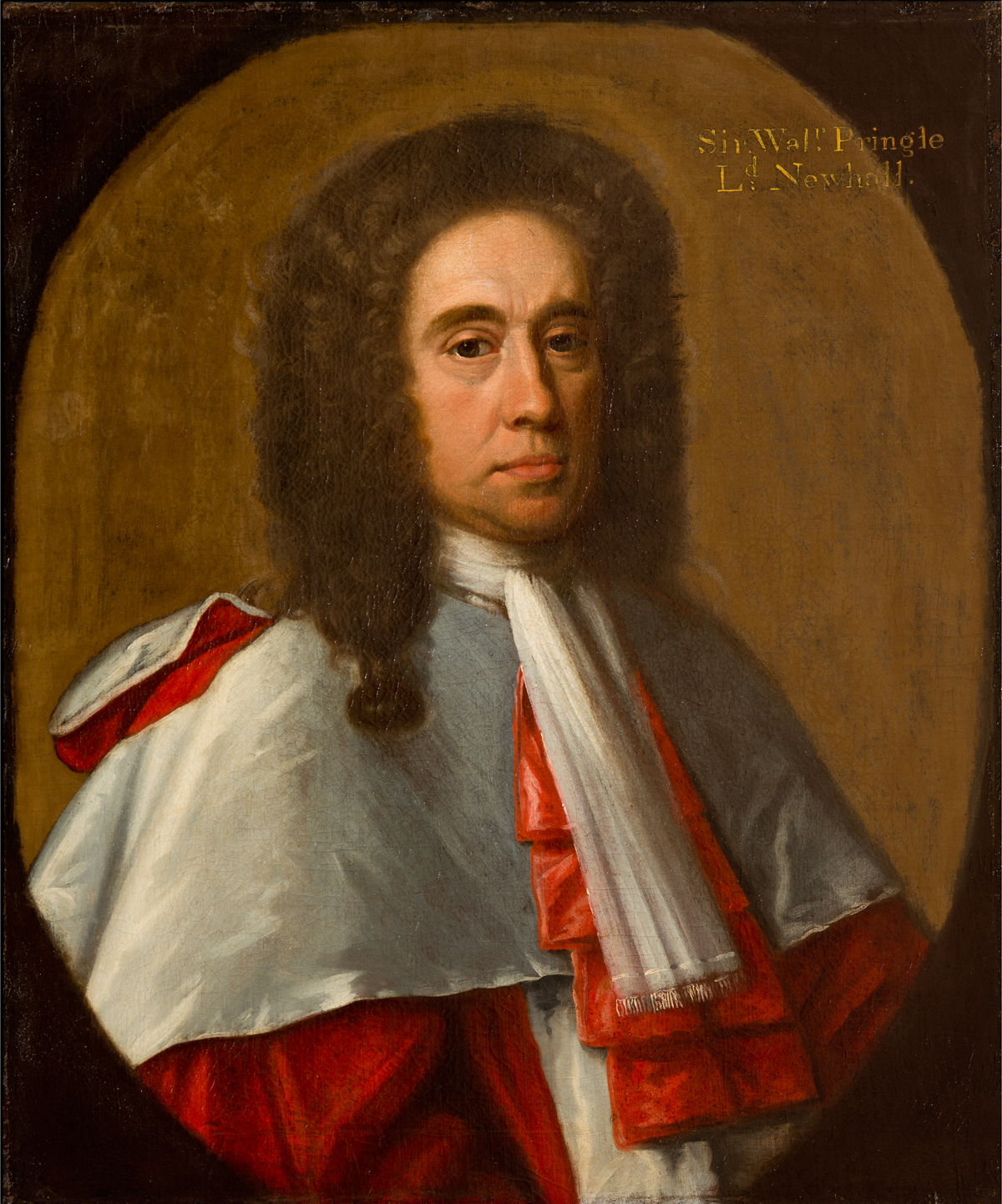
Lord Newhall

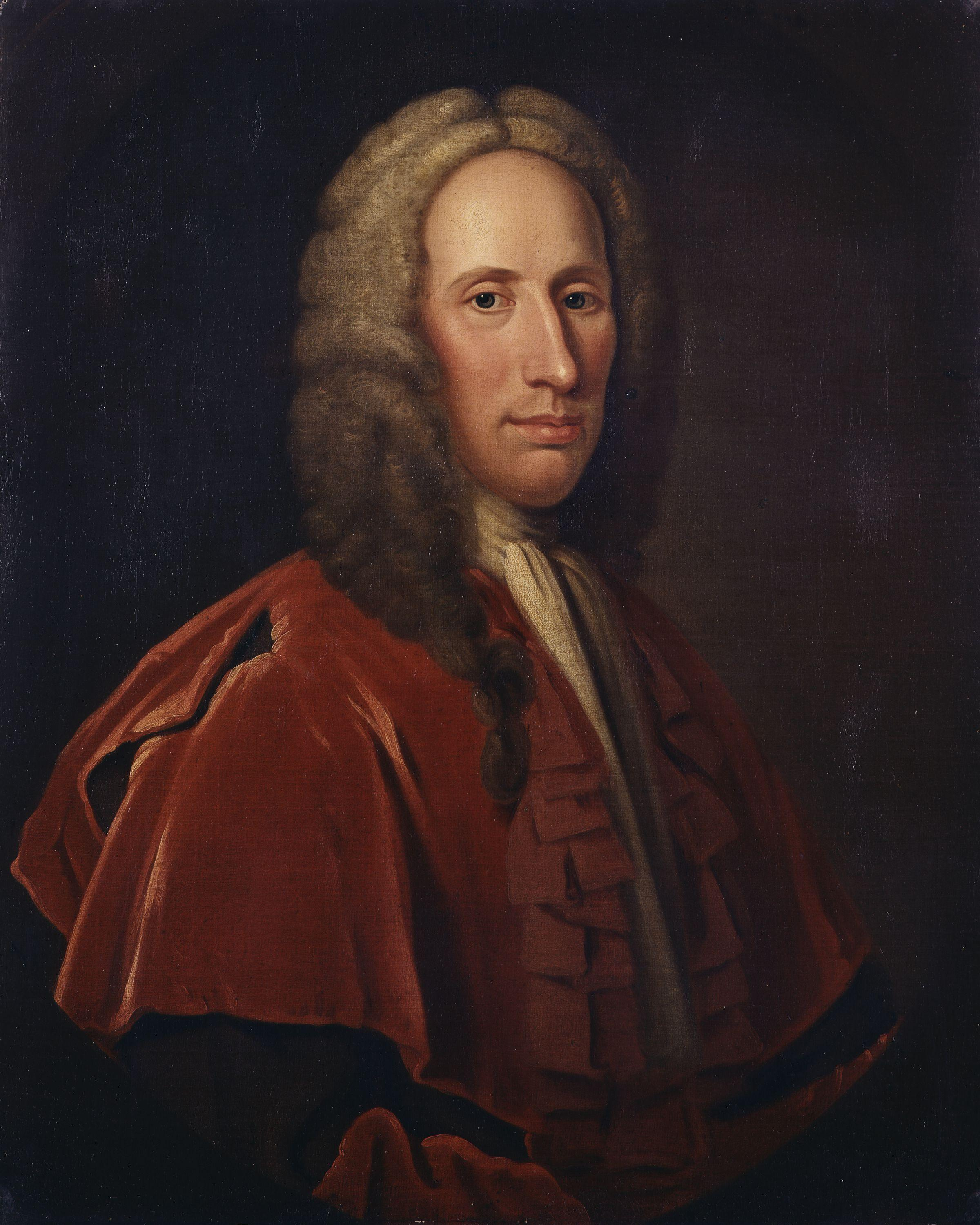
Duncan Forbes, 5th of Culloden

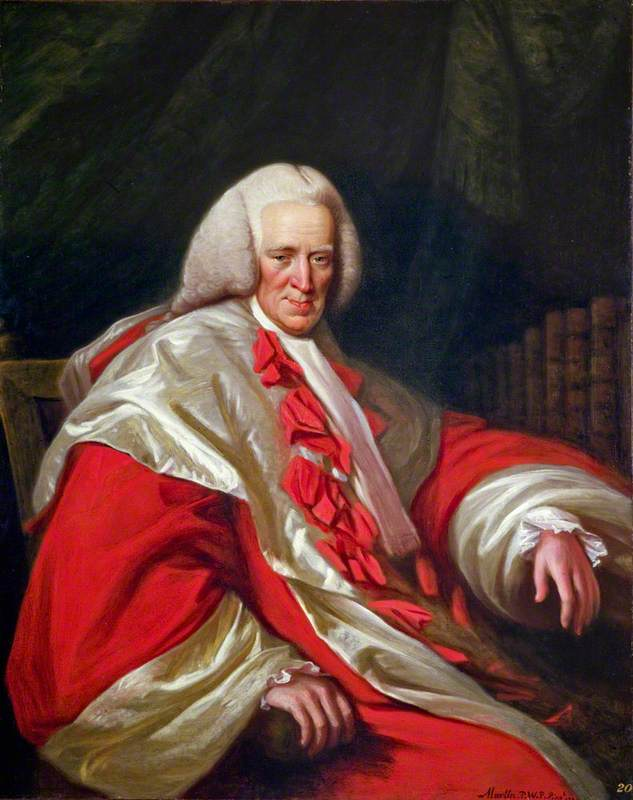
Lord Kames

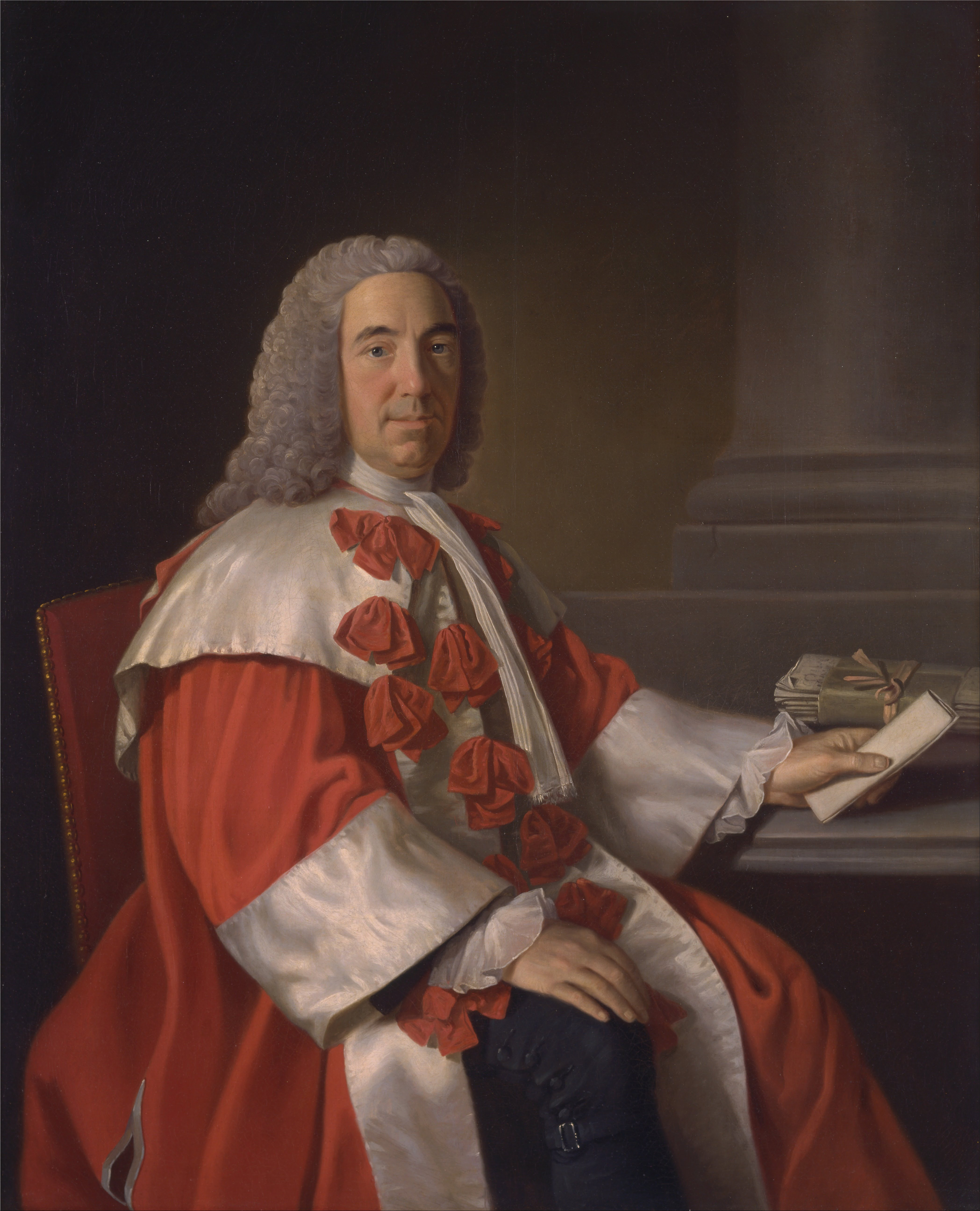
Lord Auchinleck

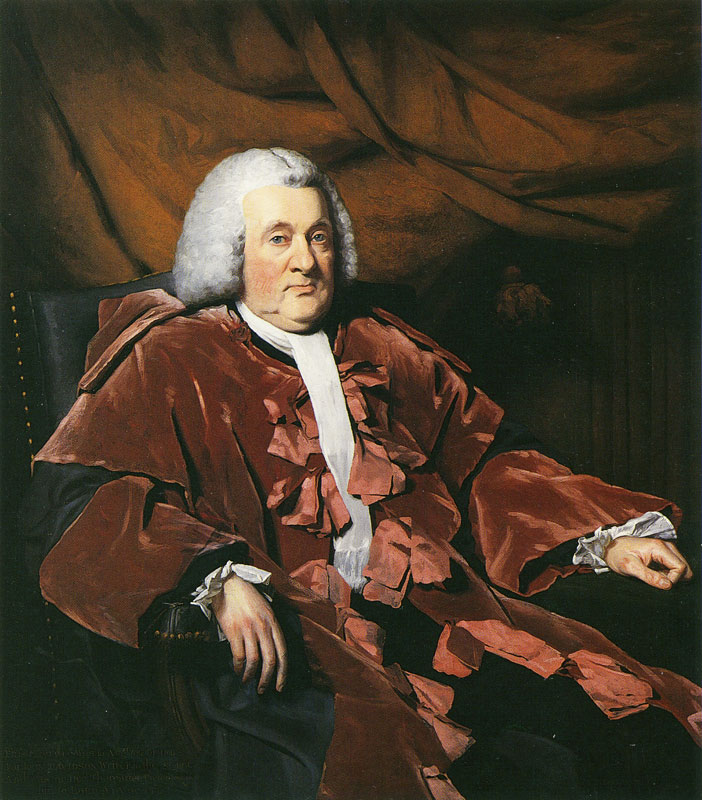
Lord President Dundas

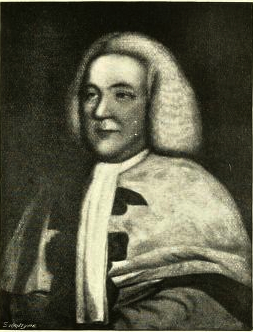
Lord Pitfour

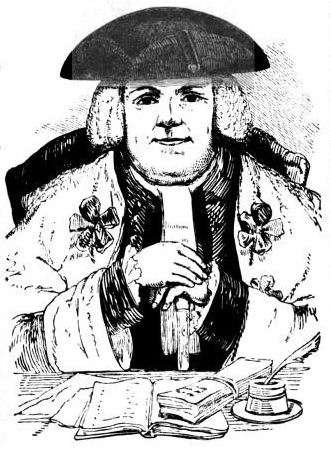
Lord Hailes

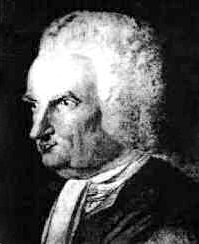
Lord Monboddo

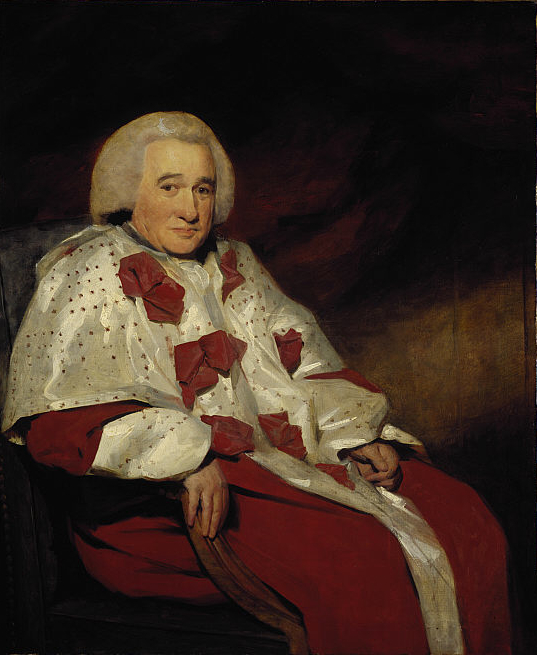
Lord Braxfield

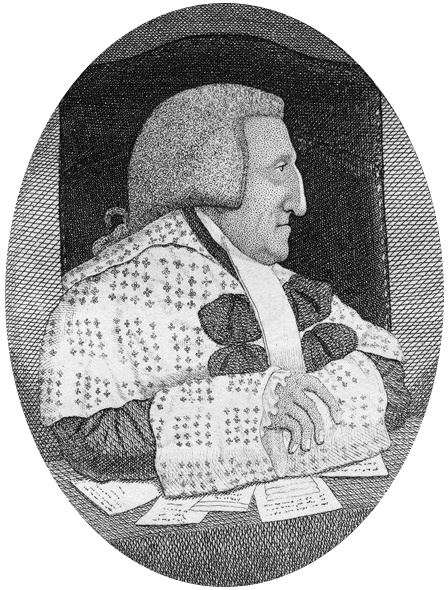
Lord Eskgrove

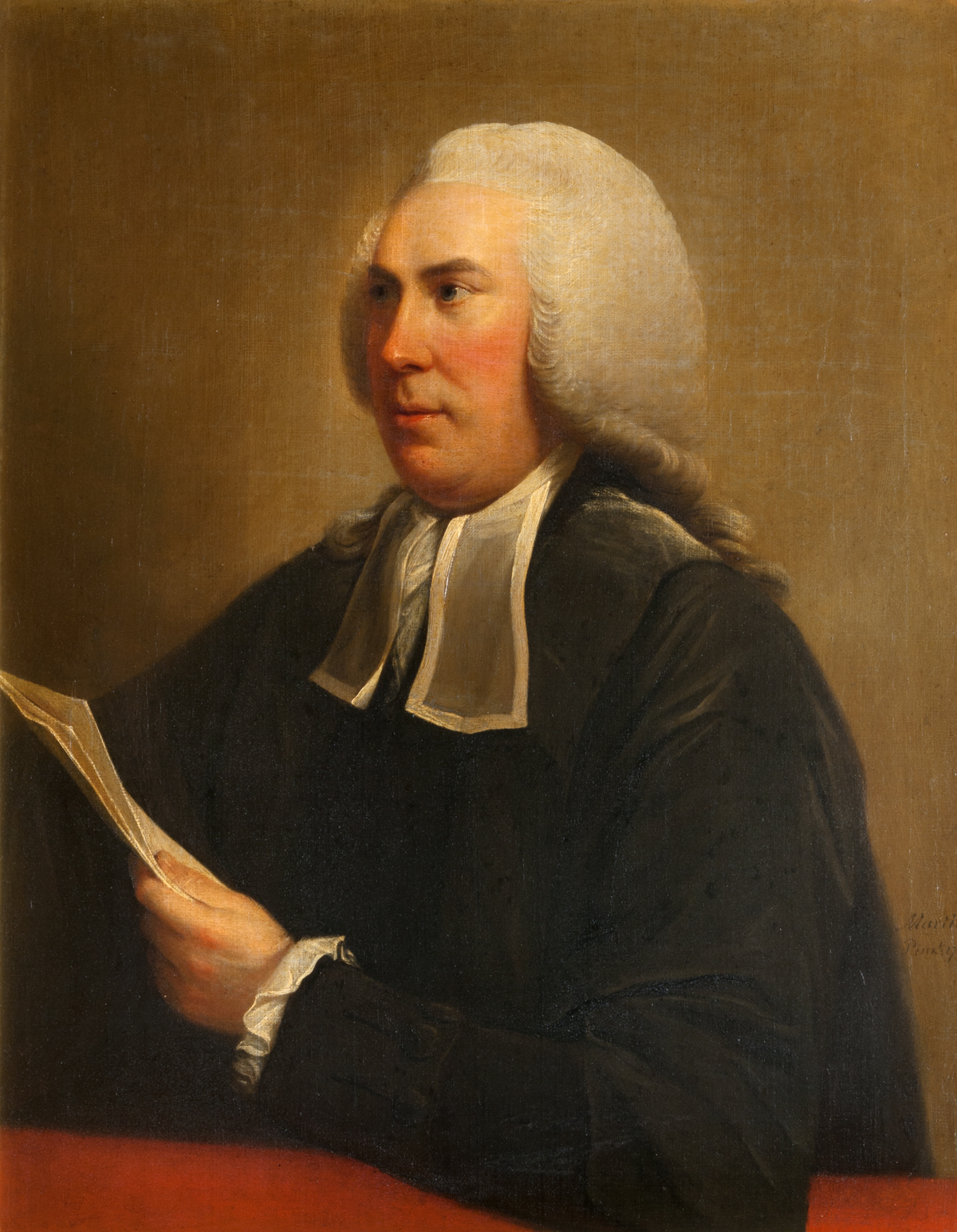
Lord Henderland

Lord Dunsinane

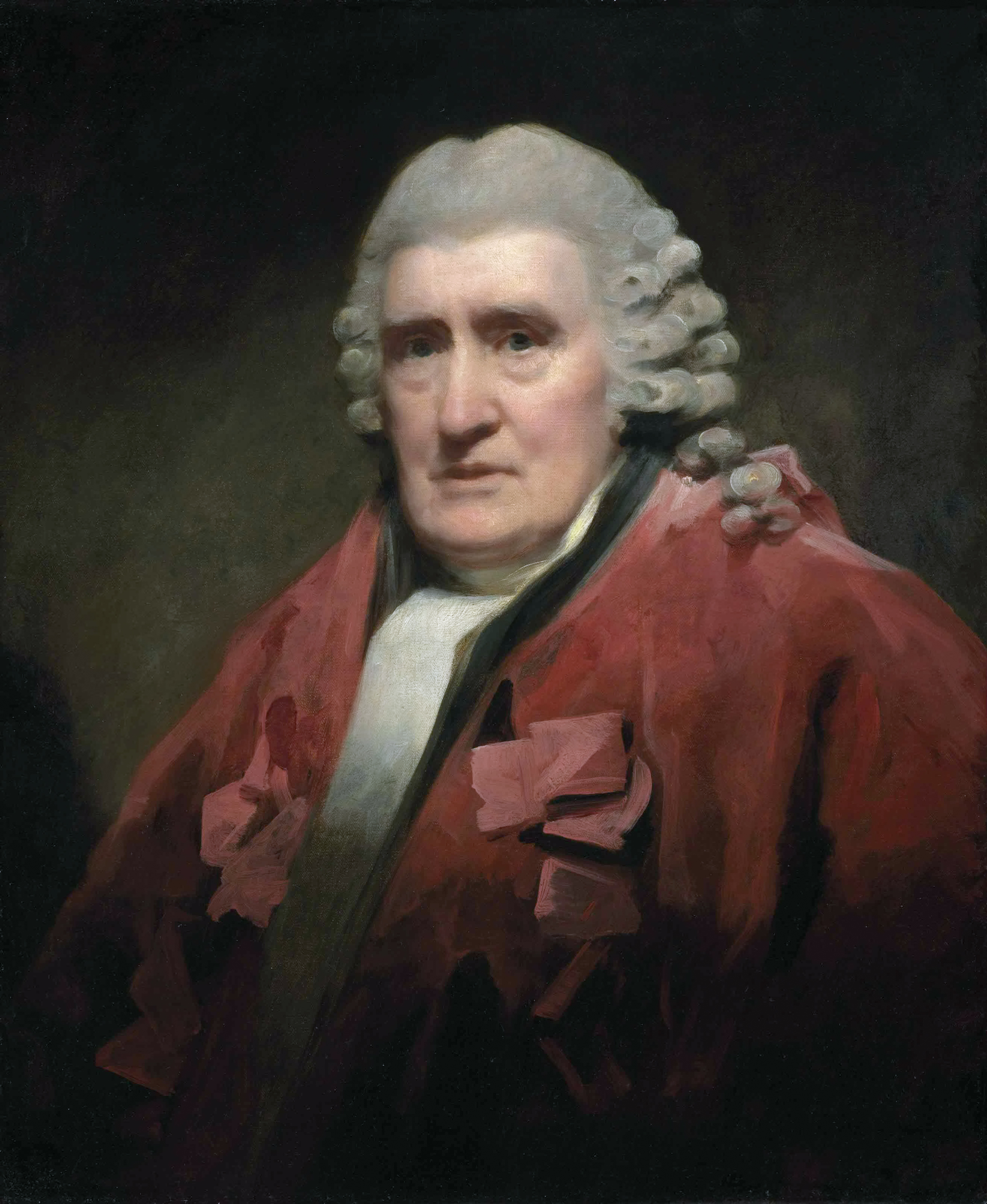
Lord Polkemmet

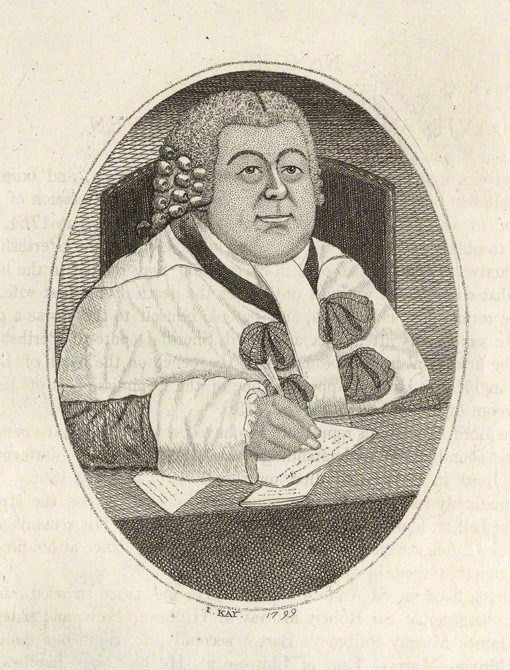
Lord Methven

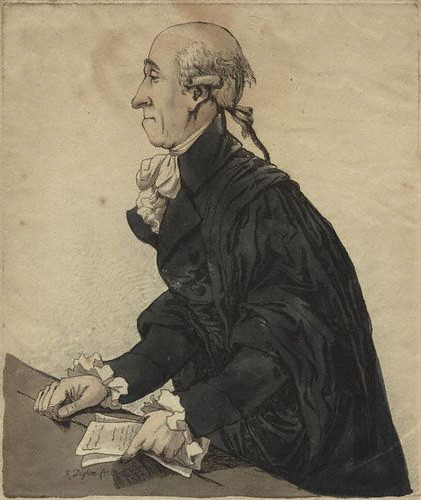
Lord (Allan) Meadowbank

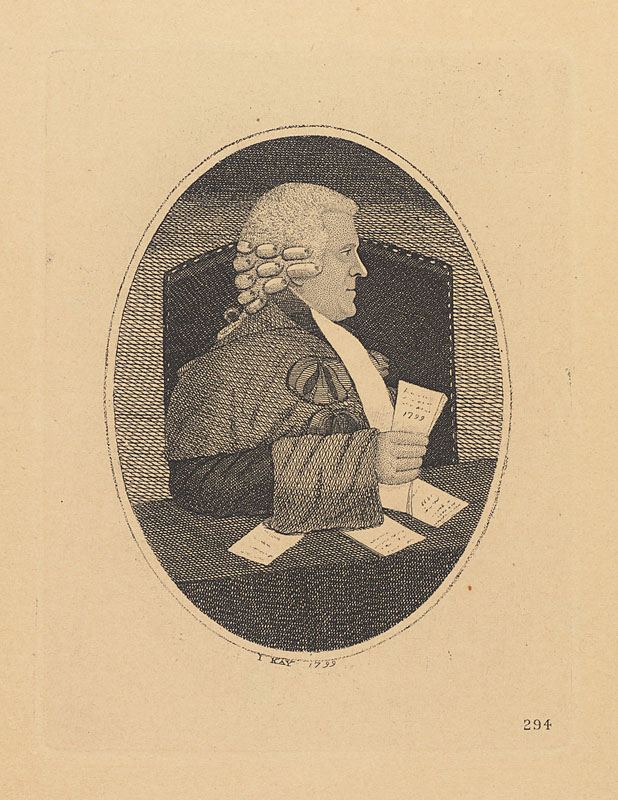
Lord Bannatyne

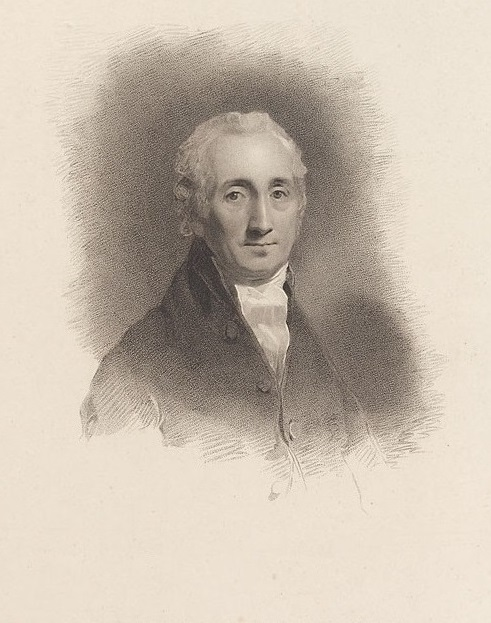
Lord Woodhouselee

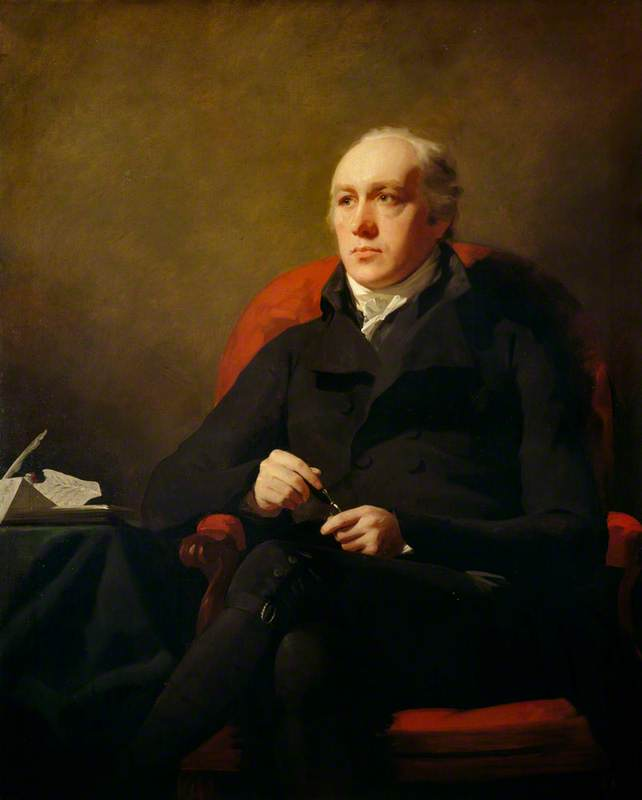
Lord Granton

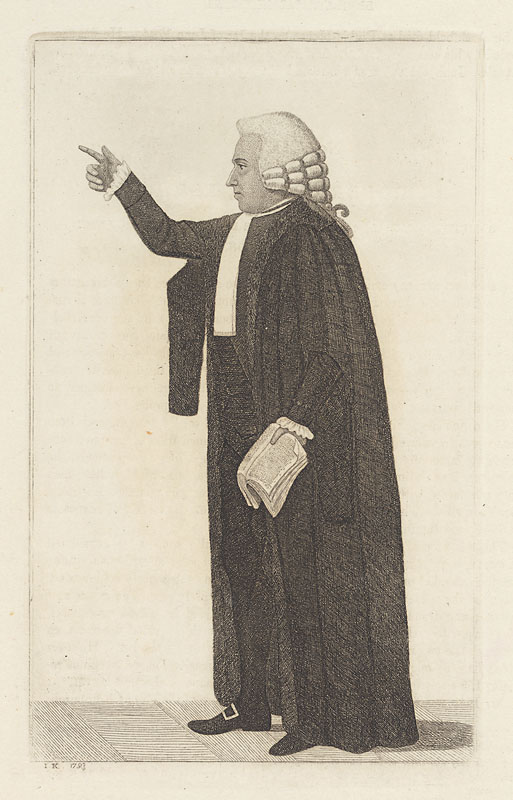
Lord Avontoun

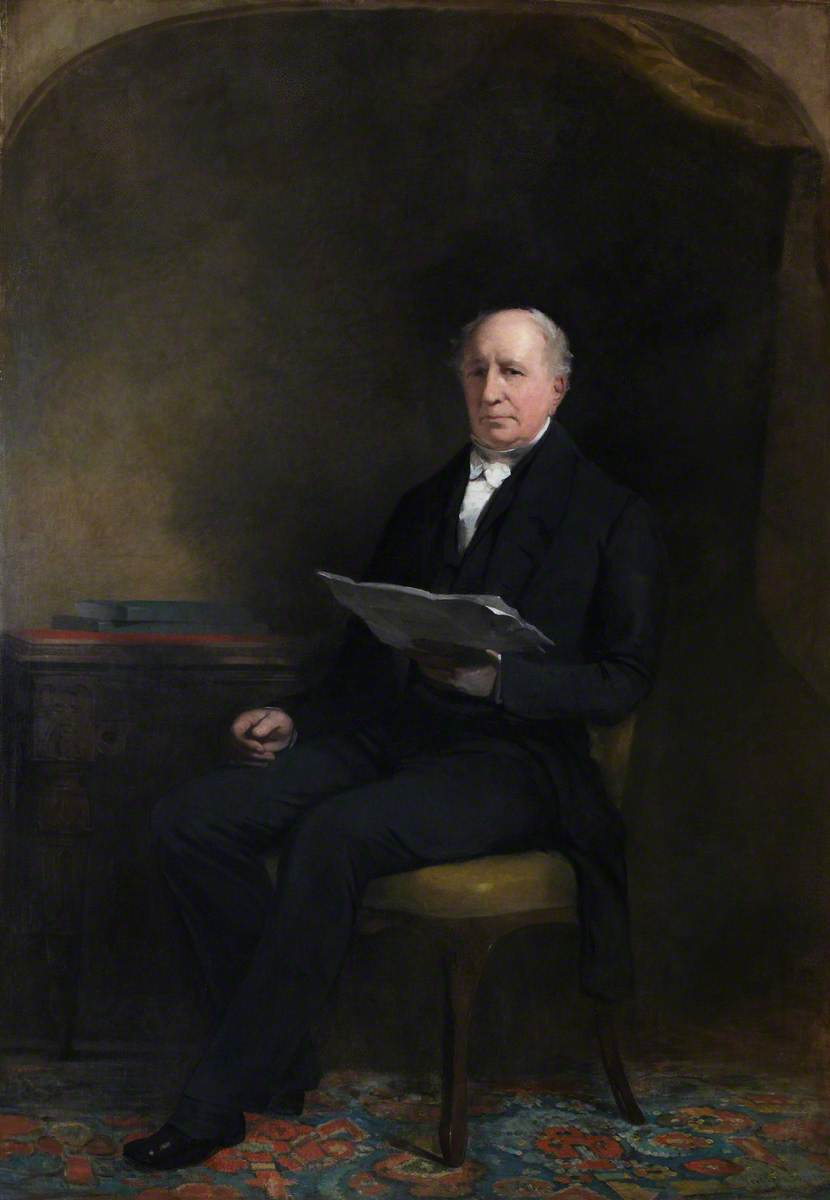
Lord Boyle

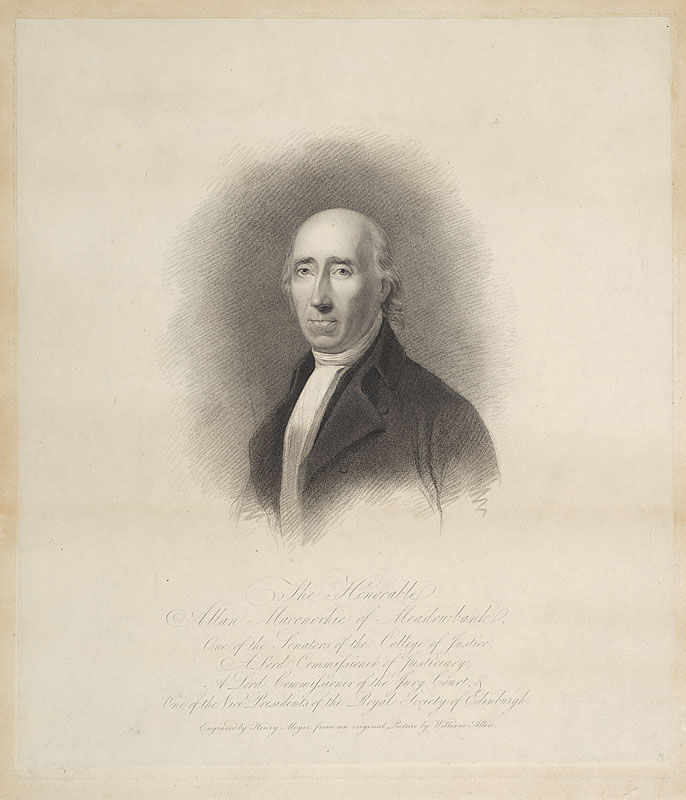
Lord (Alexander) Meadowbank

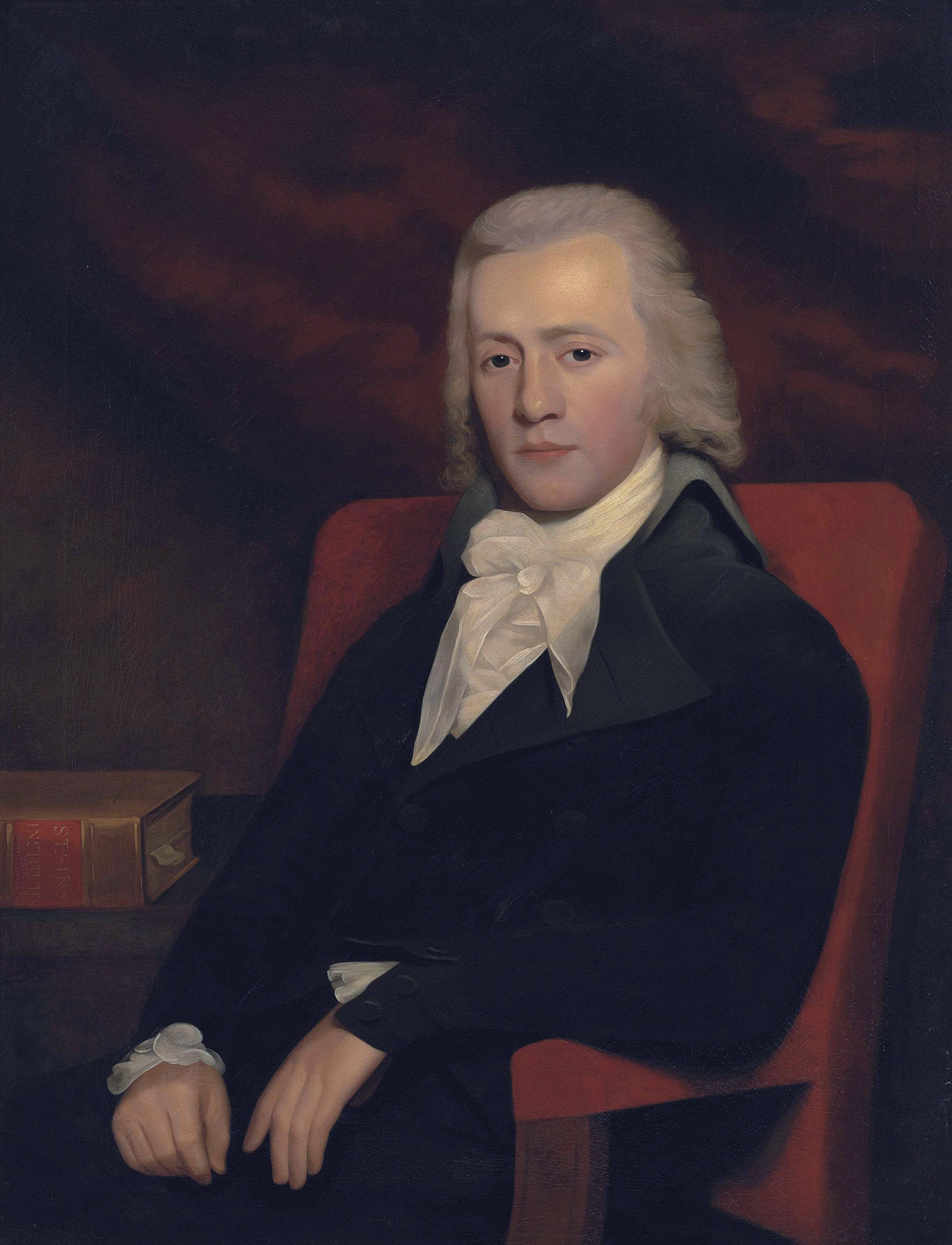
Lord Kinneder

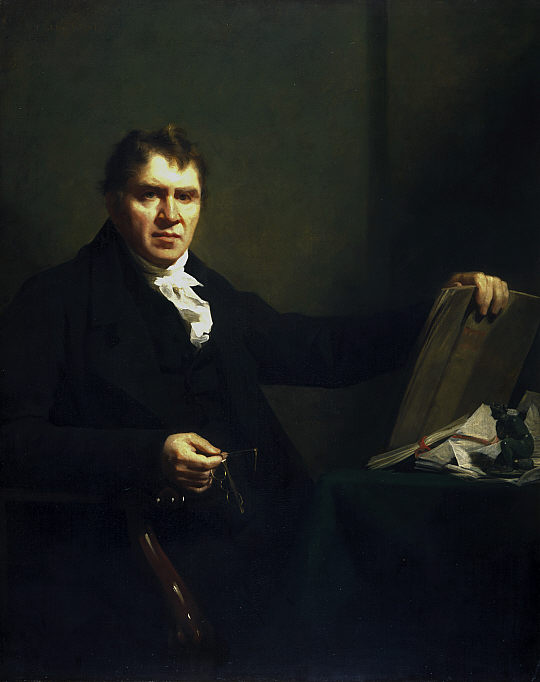
Lord Eldin

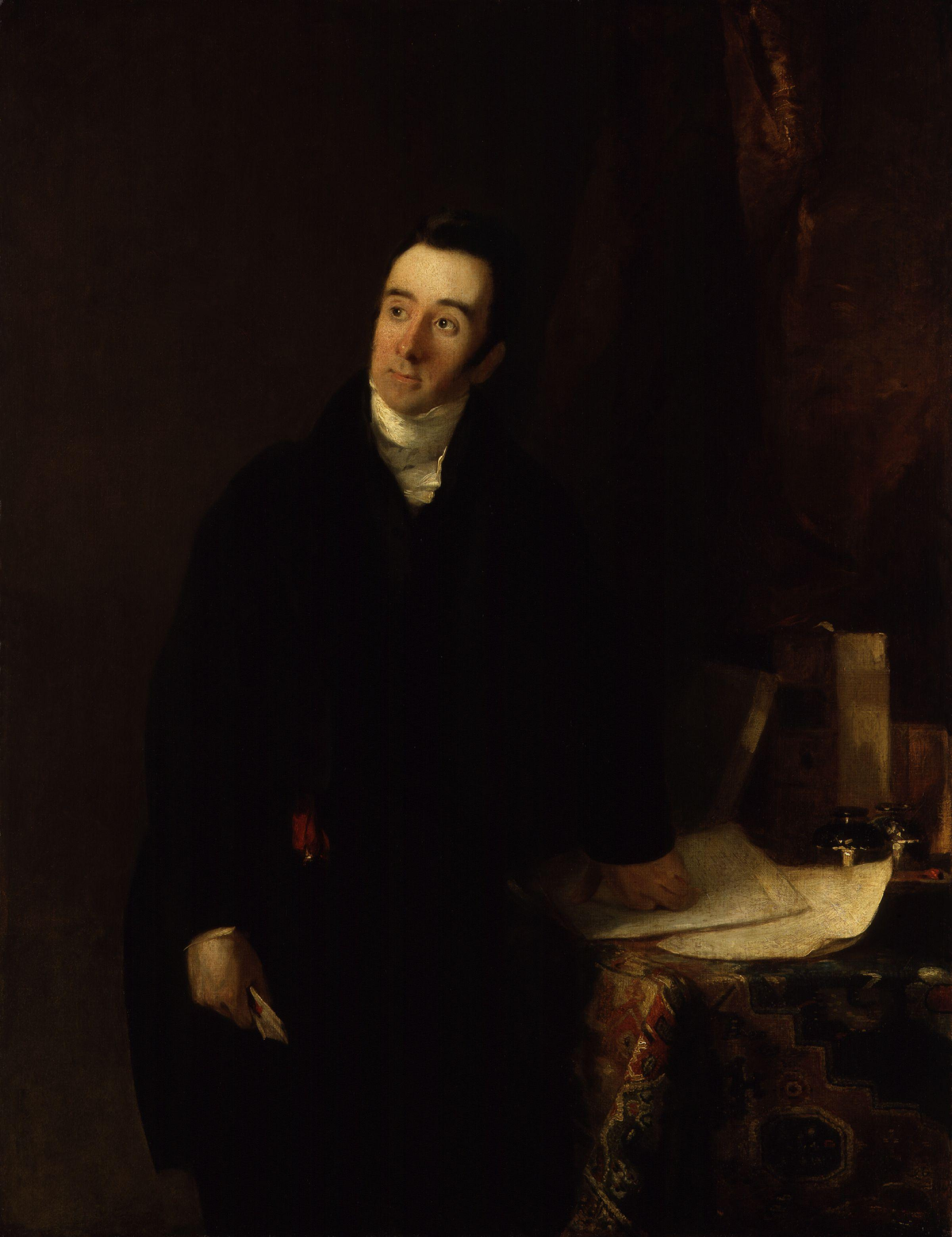
Lord Jeffrey

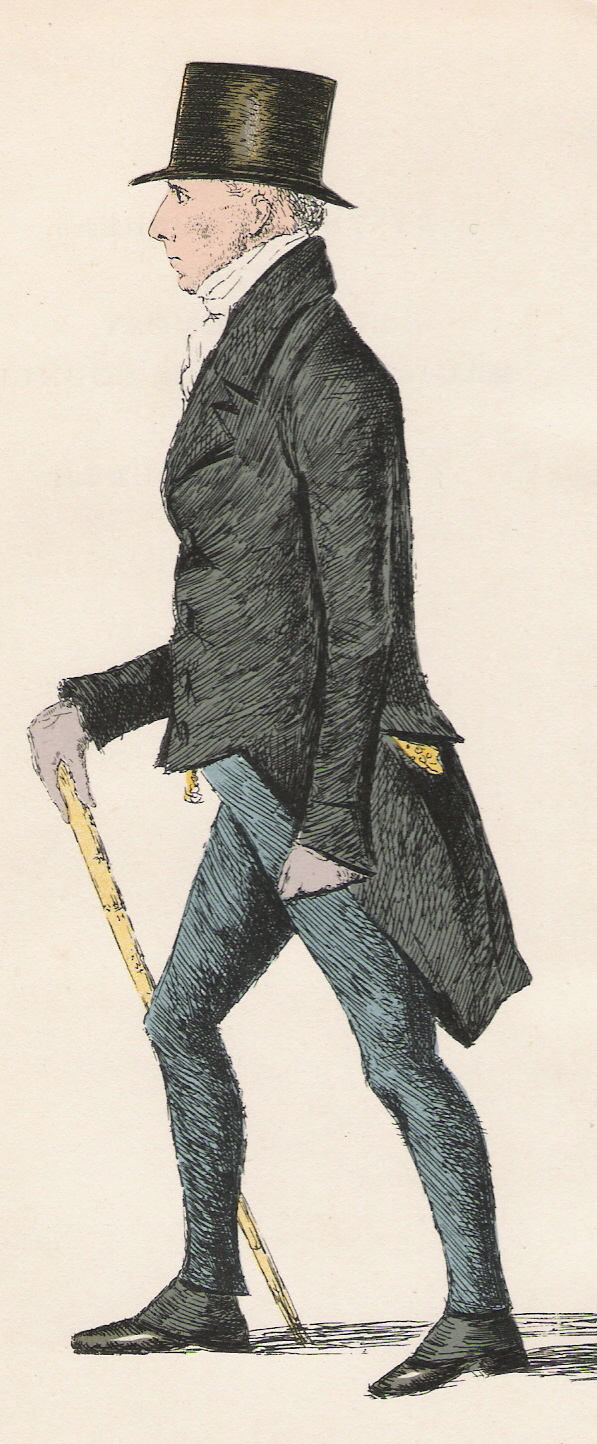
Lord Cockburn

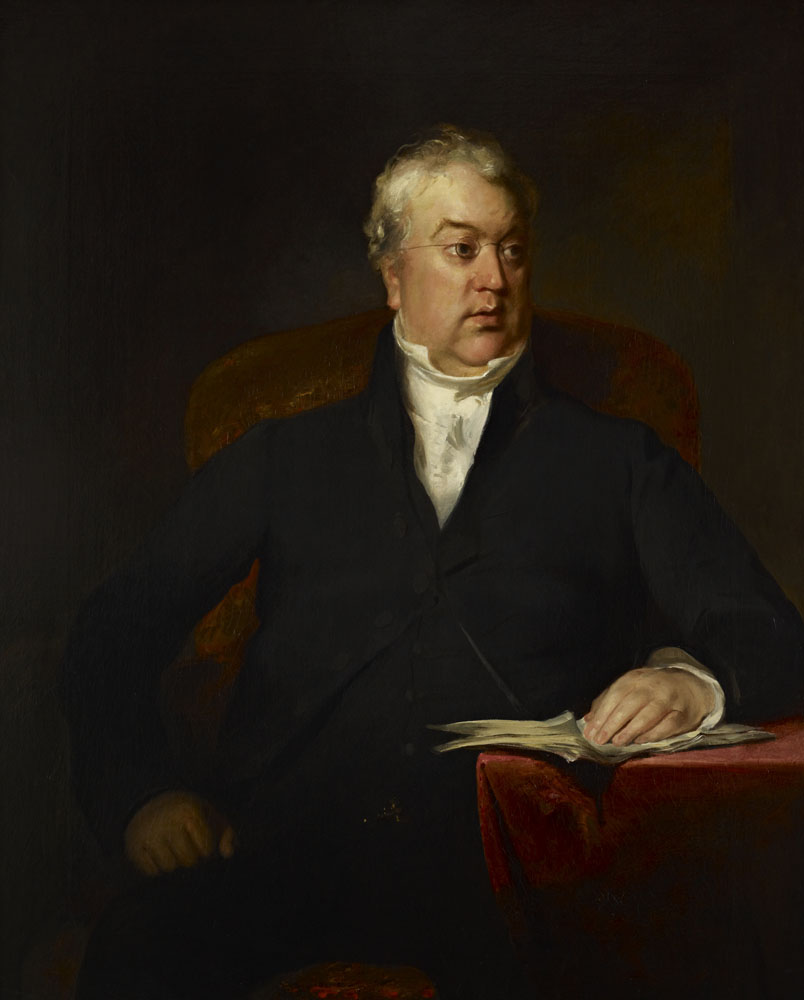
Lord Robertson

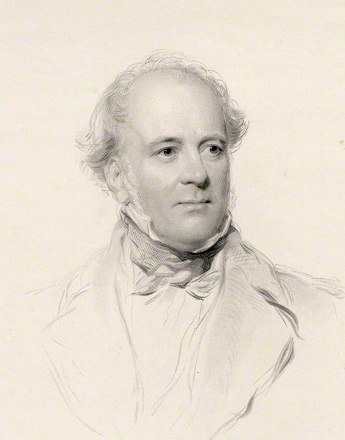
Lord Rutherfurd

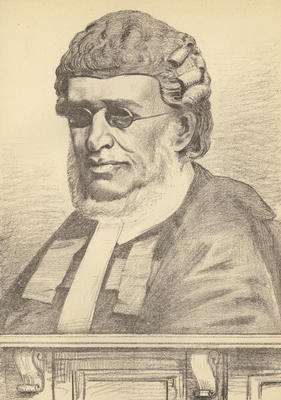
Lord Neaves

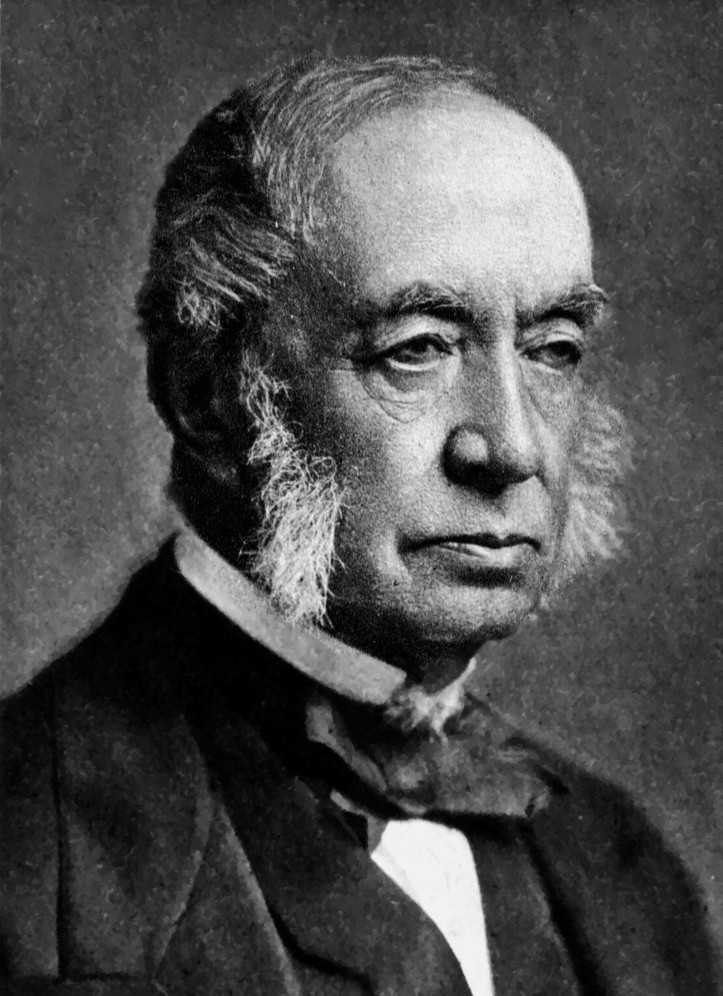
Lord Glencorse

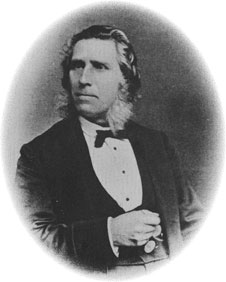
Lord Gifford

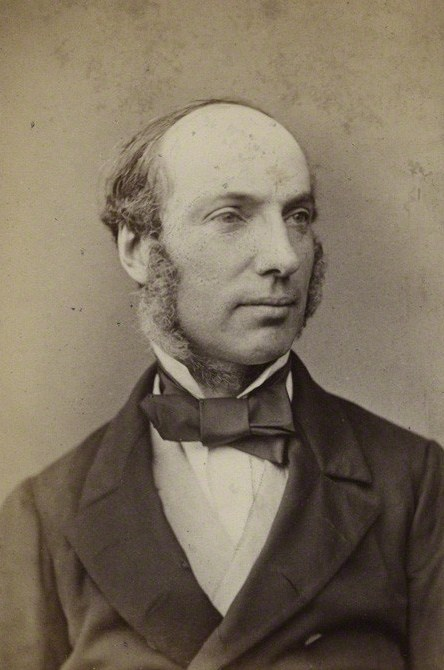
Lord Young

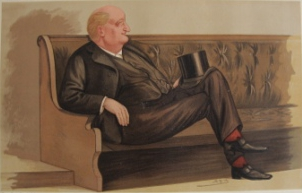
Lord Kingsburgh

== Sources ==
- An Historical Account of the Senators of the College of Justice from its Institution in MDXXXII by George Brunton and David Haig, published by Thomas Clark MDCCCXXXII – for entries 1689 to 1850 only
- Leigh Rayment's website – for entries 1851 to present (with corrections)
