= List of deans of the Faculty of Advocates =

The dean of the Faculty of Advocates, also known as the dean of faculty, is the head of the Faculty of Advocates, the independent body for advocates in Scotland. The dean is elected by the whole membership.

== List of deans of faculty ==
- 1582–????: John Sharp

17th century

- 1655–????: John Nisbet
- 1661–????: John Ellis of Elliston
- 1664–????: Robert Sinclair of Longformacus
- 1672–????: George Lockhart
- 1675–????: Sir Andrew Birnie. Later Lord Saline.
- 1680–????: Sir John Dalrymple
- 1682–1689: George Mackenzie of Rosehaugh
- 1690–????: Sir John Dalrymple
- 1691–????: Sir Robert Colt
- 1694–1695: Sir James Stewart
- 1695–1698: Hew Dalrymple
- 1698–>1708: Robert Bennet

18th century

- 1698–>1708: Robert Bennet
- 1712–1721: Sir David Dalrymple
- 1721–1722: Robert Dundas of Arniston, the Elder
- 1722–1746: ??
- 1746–1760: Robert Dundas of Arniston, the younger
- 1760–1764: James Ferguson
- 1764–1775: Alexander Lockhart
- ????–1785: Henry Dundas
- 1785–1795: Henry Erskine
- 1796–????: Robert Dundas (1758–1819)

19th century

- 1801–1808: Robert Blair
- 1808–1823: Matthew Ross of Candie
- 1823–1826: George Cranstoun
- 1826–????: Sir James Wellwood Moncreiff, 9th Baronet
- 1829: Francis Jeffrey
- 1830–1841: John Hope
- 1842–1843: Patrick Robertson
- 1843–1851: Duncan McNeill
- 1852: John Marshall
- 1852–1858: ??
- 1858–1869: James Moncreiff
- 1868—1874: Edward Gordon
- 1874–1875: Andrew Rutherfurd-Clark
- 1875–1876: William Watson
- 1877: Robert Horne
- 1878–1881: Patrick Fraser
- 1881: Alexander Kinnear
- 1882–1885: John Macdonald
- 1885–1886: John Balfour
- 1886–1889: ??
- 1889–1892: John Balfour (second term)
- 1892–1895: Charles Pearson
- 1895–1905: Alexander Asher

20th century

- 1895–1905: Alexander Asher
- 1905–1908: William Campbell
- 1908–1915: Charles Dickson
- 1915–1918: James Avon Clyde
- 1919–1920: Charles Murray
- 1920–1922: Andrew Constable
- Condie Sandeman fl. 1927
- 1932–1936: Sir William Chree
- 1936–1937: James Keith
- 1937–1939: William Donald Patrick
- 1939–1945: James Gordon McIntyre, Lord Sorn
- 1945–1948: James Reid
- 1948–1955: John Cameron
- 1955–1957: Christopher Guest
- 1957: Charles Shaw
- 1959–1964: Ian Fraser
- 1964–1965: Alexander Thomson
- 1965–1970: George Emslie
- 1970–1972: Robert Smith Johnston
- 1973–1976: Donald Ross
- 1976–1979: James Mackay
- 1979–1983: Charles Kemp Davidson
- 1983–1986: William Prosser
- 1986–1989: David Hope
- 1989–1994: Alan Johnston
- 1994–1997: Andrew Hardie
- 1997–2001: Nigel Emslie

21st century

- 1997–2001: Nigel Emslie
- 2001–2004: Colin Campbell
- 2004–2007: Robert Logan "Roy" Martin
- 2007–2014: Richard Keen
- 2014–2016: James Wolffe
- 2016–2020: Gordon Jackson
- 2020–present: Roddy Dunlop
