= Roderick Macdonald, Lord Uist =

Scottish judge

The Honourable Lord Uist

Senator of the College of Justice
- In office 2006–2021
- Nominated by: Jack McConnell; As First Minister
- Appointed by: Elizabeth II

Personal details
- Born: Roderick Francis Macdonald; 1 February 1951 (age 75)
- Education: University of Glasgow

Roderick Francis Macdonald, Lord Uist (born 1 February 1951) is a Scottish retired judge. As a Senator of the College of Justice, he was a member of the Court of Session, Scotland's highest court.

== Early life ==
Macdonald was educated at St Mungo's Academy, a Roman Catholic state school in Glasgow, and at the University of Glasgow Faculty of Law. (LL.B. Hons.). He was admitted to the Faculty of Advocates in 1975.

== Legal career ==
Macdonald served as an Advocate Depute from 1987 to 1993, from 1990 as Home Advocate Depute. He was appointed Queen's Counsel in 1989. He was called to the Bar of England and Wales in 1997 (Inner Temple). From 1995 to 2001, he was Legal Chairman of the Pension Appeal Tribunals for Scotland, and from 1995 to 2000 was a member of the Criminal Injuries Compensation Board, and of the Criminal Injuries Compensation Appeals Panel from 1997 to 1999. He was appointed a Temporary Judge in 2001, and in 2006 was appointed a full-time judge of the Court of Session and High Court of Justiciary, Scotland's Supreme Courts, as a Senator of the College of Justice. He took the judicial title Lord Uist, sat in the Outer House, and retired on 1 February 2021.

Prominent cases Macdonald has presided over included the 2006 trial of three of the race hate murderers of Kriss Donald.

== See also ==
- Historic list of Senators of the College of Justice
