= John Baird, Lord Newbyth =

Scottish judge and diplomat (1620–1698)

Sir John Baird, Lord Newbyth (1620 – 1698), was a Scottish advocate, judge, politician and diplomat. He served as Commissioner for Aberdeenshire in the Parliament of Scotland.

Baird was the son of James Baird of Byth, advocate and commissary of Edinburgh, and Bathia, daughter of Sir John Dempster of Pitliver.

John was admitted advocate on 3 June 1647.

Baird appears to have been knighted by Charles II on his accession to the throne of Scotland in 1651, In the correspondence of the Earls of Ancram and Lothian (1616–67), Baird is referred to as Sir John, under date 1653. Thenceforward his name occurs with some frequency in that correspondence, and usually in such a connection as to suggest that he was regarded as a person of some weight and sagacity.

On his father’s death, he moved from Byth in Aberdeenshire to Newbyth in East Lothian.

Like his father, he belonged to the covenanting party, and was considered of sufficient consequence to be excluded from the operation of the Act of Indemnity passed by the parliament of Scotland in 1662, being then mulcted in the sum of 2,400l. His eminence at the bar, however, could not be ignored, and in 1664 he was created an ordinary lord of session, assuming the title of Lord Newbyth.

In the Scottish parliaments of 1665 and 1667 he represented Aberdeenshire. He sat on the committee of taxation in the former, and on that of supply in the latter, parliament. He was not returned to the parliament of 1669. Also in 1669, a grant of the barony of Gilmertoun within the sheriffdom of Edinburgh, made in his favour by the crown in 1667, was ratified by the parliament.

In 1670, he was nominated one of the commissioners to negotiate the then projected Treaty of Union between Scotland and England. In 1680 his youngest and only surviving son, William, was created baronet. By reason of his opposition to the arbitrary measures of the government he was superseded in the office of lord of session in 1681, Sir Patrick Ogilvie of Boyne being appointed in his place. He acted as commissioner of the cess for the shire of Edinburgh in 1685, and also as commissioner of supply for the same county.

On the accession of the Prince of Orange he was re-appointed ordinary lord of session (1689), and retained his seat upon the bench until his death in 1698. In the Advocates' Library at Edinburgh are preserved certain papers in the handwriting of Lord Newbyth, being a collection of decisions ranging from 1664 to 1667, and a collection of practiques belonging to the period between 1664 and 1681.

== Family ==
His brother was Sir Robert Baird of Saughton Hall.

John married Margaret, daughter of Sir William Hay of Linplum, by whom he had four children, three sons and one daughter;

- John, born on 4 October 1648;
- Margaret, born on 23 December 1649;
- John, born on 23 September 1652;
- William, born on 12 November 1654.

His son, Sir William Baird (1654-1737) was created Baronet of Newbyth; William’s son Sir John Baird (1686-1745) inherited the baronetcy and was an MP for Midlothian. When he died, the first Newbyth baronetcy became extinct.

In 1809, the title was recreated and his distant relative David Baird (1757-1829) became 1st baronet of Newbyth.
