= Robert Smith Johnston, Lord Kincraig =

The Honourable Lord Kincraig

Senator of the College of Justice
- In office 1972–1987
- Monarch: Elizabeth II

Personal details
- Born: Robert Smith Johnston; 10 October 1918 Edinburgh
- Died: 19 September 2004 (aged 85) Edinburgh
- Education: St John's College, Cambridge; University of Glasgow
- Profession: Advocate

Hon. Lord (Robert Smith Johnston) Kincraig (10 October 1918 – 19 September 2004) was a Senator of the College of Justice in Scotland from 1972 to 1987 and chairman of the Parole Review Body for Scotland, 1988.

== Early life ==
Robert Smith Johnston was educated at Strathallan School in Perthshire. He graduated from St John's College, Cambridge in 1939 and from the University of Glasgow in 1942. Owing to a medical condition, he was considered unfit for military service at the beginning of the Second World War, so he continued his studies and began his legal career during those years.

== Career ==
Johnston was admitted to the Faculty of Advocates in 1942 and quickly established a substantial and varied practice which he developed during the forties and fifties. He served as an Advocate Depute from 1953 to 1955 to the Crown Office and became a King's Counsel (Scotland) in 1955.

In 1959, he unsuccessfully contested the Stirling and Falkirk burghs constituency in the general election as a Unionist candidate. He served as Home Advocate Depute between 1959 and 1962 and as the Sheriff-Depute of Roxburgh, Berwick and Selkirk from 1964 to 1970. In 1970, he was elected Dean of the Faculty of Advocates, a post which he held until 1972. He misdirected the jury in the Ice Cream Van murders trial of Campbell and Steele, who were later freed on appeal.

Johnston was appointed to the benches of the Court of Session and High Court of Justiciary, Scotland's Supreme Courts in 1972 as a Senator of the College of Justice with the judicial title, Lord Kincraig and remained on the bench until 1987.

In 1988, he was appointed by the government to chair a committee on the general question of the early release of prisoners and the parole system in general as a consequence of rioting in UK prisons. A similar committee was established in England chaired by Lord Carlisle. The government accepted most of the recommendations; in 1993, legislation was introduced on the automatic early release of short-term prisoners, subject to recall if reoffending, and a revised parole system.

== See also ==
- Historic List of Senators of the College of Justice
