= John Wark, Lord Wark =

Scottish lawyer

John Lean Wark, Lord Wark LLD (1877–1943) was a Scottish lawyer who served as a Senator of the College of Justice.

== Life ==
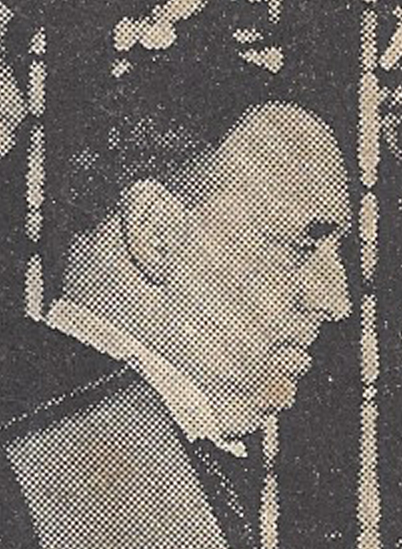
John Wark, Lord Wark

He was born in 1877. He is thought to be the son of John Wark, a Glasgow lawyer living in Pollokshields.

In 1908, as his main claim to fame, he preceded over the final trial at Inverary Courthouse.

In 1910 he is listed as an advocate living in a flat at 12 Nelson Street, Edinburgh.

In February 1933 he was elected a Senator of the College of Justice under the title of Lord Wark.

He succeeded Christopher Johnston, Lord Sands as Convenor of the Restoration Committee of Greyfriars Kirk in Edinburgh.

He was cremated at Warriston Crematorium on 21 December 1943 following a services at Greyfriars Kirk led by Rev D W P Strang and Very Rev James Black.

== Family ==
He was outlived by his wife Lady Wark (née Mary Wright), who died in 1976.

Their sons were John G L Wark WS, Captain Thomas Wark and Alan Wark RN.
