= William Prosser, Lord Prosser =

Scottish judge and advocate for the arts

William David Prosser, Lord Prosser, PC (1934–2015) was a Scottish judge and an advocate for the arts in Edinburgh.

== Personal life and education ==
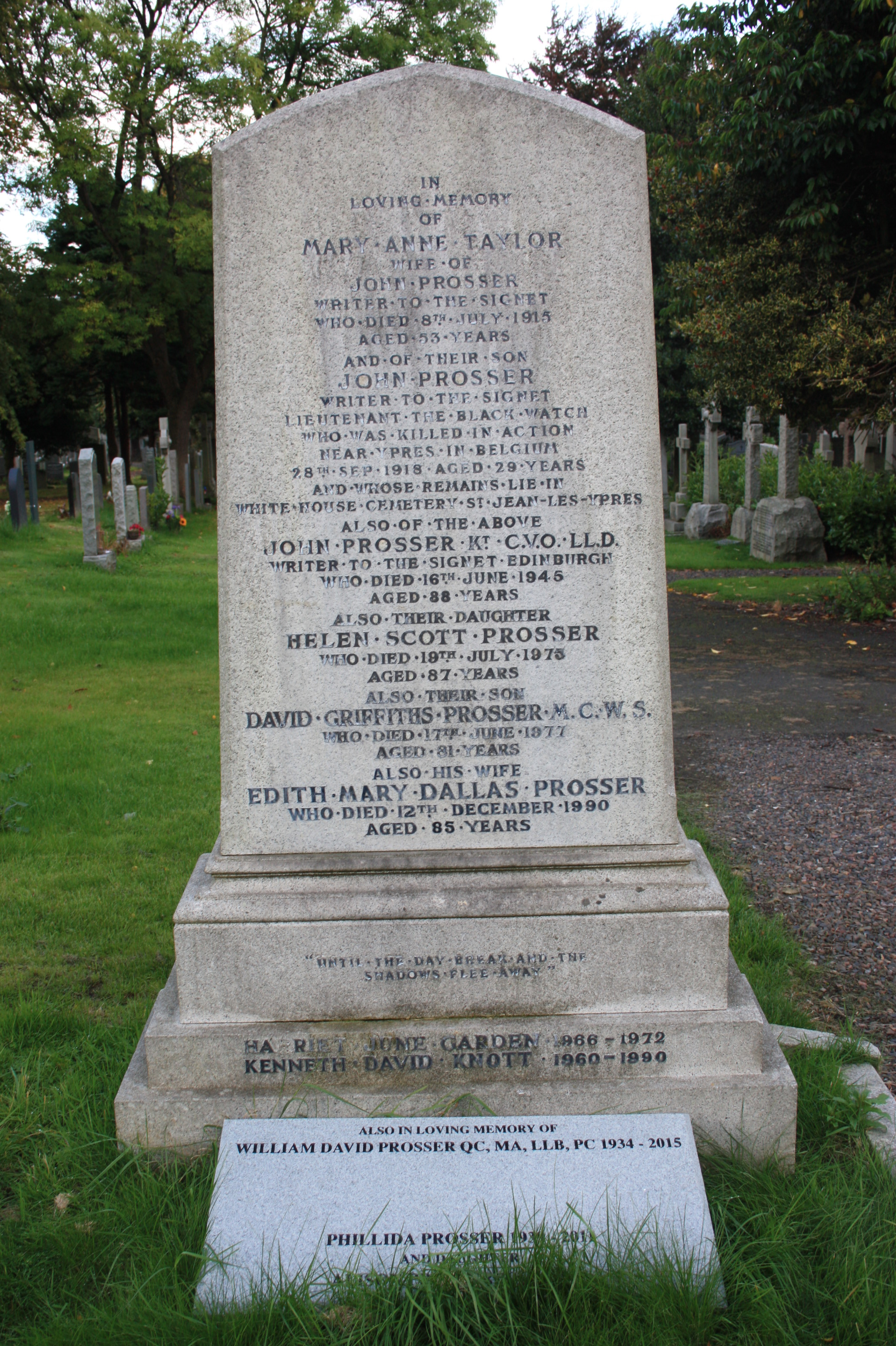
The grave of William Prosser, Dean Cemetery, Edinburgh

He was educated at the Edinburgh Academy where he was a senior Ephor (prefect). Prosser read classics at Corpus Christi College, Oxford, where he finished with a double first, and then read law at University of Edinburgh. For his National Service, he was commissioned into the Argyll and Sutherland Highlanders and served in British Guyana.

Prosser married Vanessa Lindsay in 1964. They had two sons and two daughters. Prosser died in March 2015, in Edinburgh, at the age of 80.

== Legal career ==
Prosser became an advocate in 1962, and served as Standing Junior Counsel in Scotland for the Board of Inland Revenue (1969–1974. He took silk (became a Queen's Counsel) in 1974, and served as Vice Dean (1979–1983) and then Dean (1983–1986) of the Faculty of Advocates. In 1986, he became a Court of Session judge and served until his retirement in 2001.

Prosser's legal work also included serving on the Scottish Committee of the Council on Tribunals, as trustee (2002–2007) for the Franco-British Council, and as President of the Franco-British Lawyers’ Society. He helped the University of the Highlands and Islands gain university status (2011) and served on its court.

== Arts advocacy ==
Prosser served as chairman of the Scottish Historic Buildings Trust from 1988 to 1998 where he contributed to saving buildings such as Lady Cathcart House, Ayr; Strathleven House, Dunbartonshire; Auchinleck House, Ayrshire and Law's Close, Kirkcaldy. He was also chairman of the Royal Fine Art Commission for Scotland (1990–1995), the Royal Lyceum Theatre (chairman, '87-92), the Scottish Architectural Education Trust (1994–2007), and the Sir Walter Scott Club (1993–1996).
