= James Learmonth, Lord Balcomie =

Scottish judge and Senator of the College of Justice

James Learmonth, Lord Balcomie (1600–1657) was a 17th-century Scottish judge and Senator of the College of Justice.

== Life ==
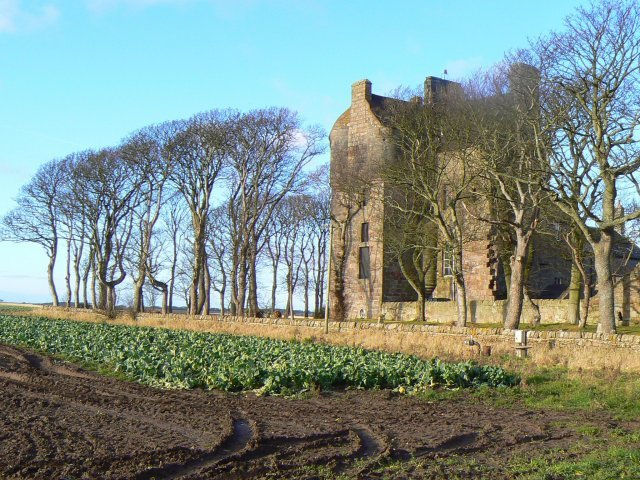
Balcomie Castle

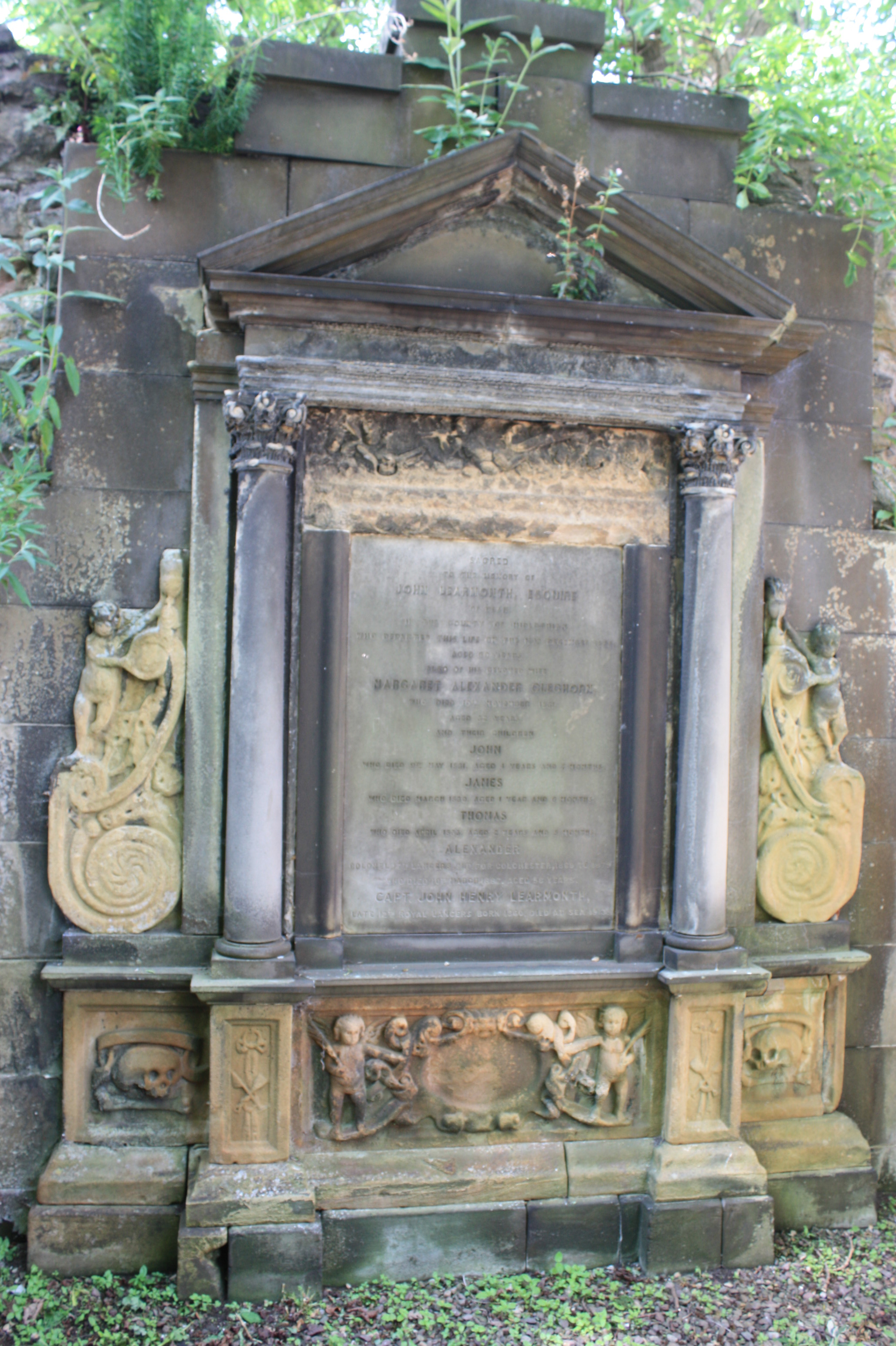
The grave of James Learmonth in Greyfriars Kirkyard, Edinburgh

He was born at Balcomie Castle near Crail, the eldest son of Sir John Learmonth (1567-1625) of Balcomie and Birkhill and his wife, Elizabeth Myreton of Randerston. He was descended from James Learmonth (1504-1547) Provost of St Andrews and Master of the Household to King James V. His grandfather James Learmonth of Dairsie and Balcomie was killed at the Battle of Pinkie Cleugh in 1547.

His father's main claim to fame was as one of the twelve Gentleman Adventurers of Fife, whose plan to usurp the Clan Macleod from the Isle of Lewis seriously backfired and apart from the loss of at least 80 lives, resulted in the imprisonment of John Learmonth for six months. His second claim to fame was as a co-signatory to the Union of crowns in 1606.

James inherited Balcomie Castle, a small Scottish tower house on the death of his father.

James was trained as a lawyer and admitted to the Scottish bench as an advocate. In 1627 he was elected a Senator of the College of Justice in place of Archibald Acheson, Lord Glencairnie.

He died in unusual circumstances, dying unexpectedly at 9am on 26 June 1657 whilst sitting on a bench in Parliament Hall next to St Giles Cathedral, much to the grief of those around him. He was buried with much pomp at Greyfriars Kirkyard with over 500 mourners in his funeral procession.

Lord Balcomie's distinctive 17th century monument has been reinscribed to Lord Balcomie's descendant John Learmonth, Lord Provost of Edinburgh in the 1830s. It lies in the inaccessible sealed section to the south known as the "Covenanters Prison".

== Family ==
He married Margaret Sandilands daughter of Sir William Sandilands of St Monans.

Their children included John Learmonth, Lord Balcomie, Regent of St Andrews University. He died young and the estate then passed to the eldest daughter who married Sir William Gordon of Lismore thereafter known as William Gordon of Balcomie.

== Trivia ==
His family home, the Balcomie estate is now a golf course and is home to the Crail Golfing Society.
