= David Nevoy =

Scottish judge (died 1683)

Sir David Nevoy, Lord Nevoy (died 1683), was a Scottish judge who was appointed lord of session and knighted in 1661.

Nevoy was promoted to the bench, 25 June 1661, and retained his office for upwards of twenty-two years. Lord Hailes mentions he had been a professor in St. Leonard's College, St. Andrews. At his first admission he was referred to as "Lord Reidie". Nevoy was appointed to the bench by Charles II of England, and was admitted "without trial or examination, on the ground that he had been nominated by the king in place of the viscount Oxford".
