= James Adam, Lord Adam =

Scottish judge (1824–1914)

James Adam
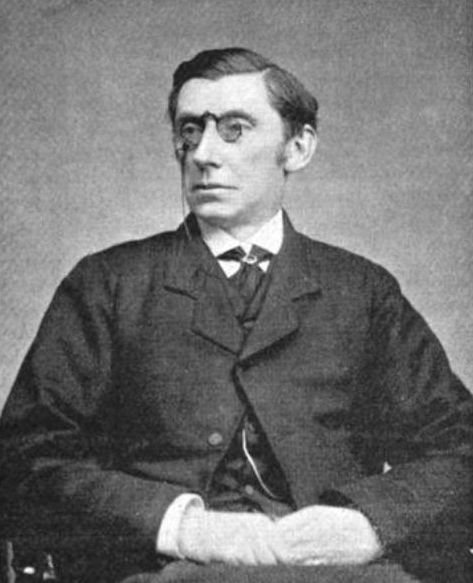
- Born: 31 October 1824; Edinburgh, Scotland
- Died: 27 August 1914 (aged 89); Middleton Hall, Midlothian, Scotland
- Burial place: Dean Cemetery
- Education: University of Edinburgh
- Occupation: Judge
- Spouse: Catharine Beatson Beatson-Bell
- Children: 3

James Adam, Lord Adam (31 October 1824 – 27 August 1914) was a Scottish judge and Senator of the College of Justice.

== Life ==
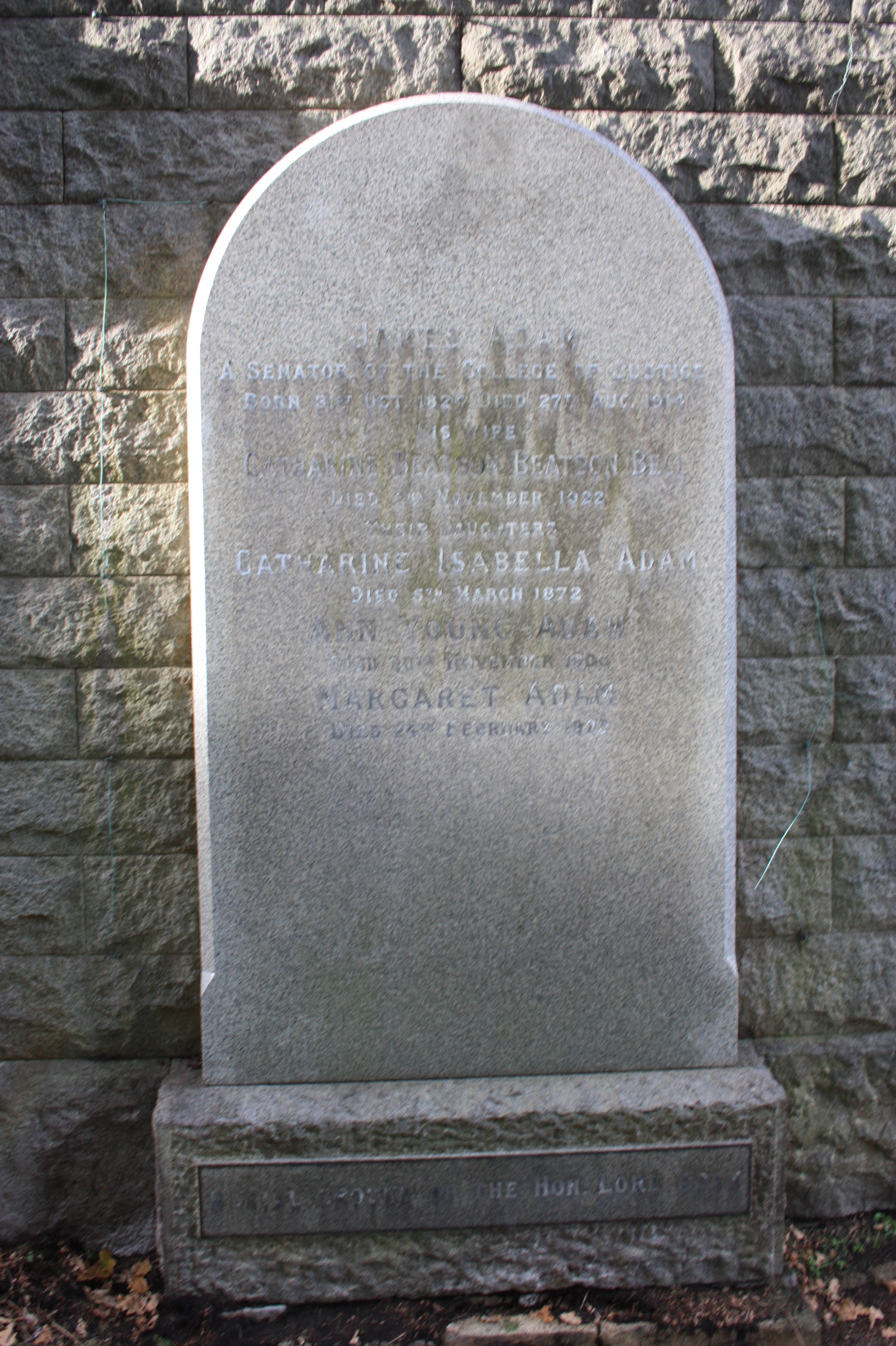
The grave of James Adam, Lord Adam, Dean Cemetery

He was born in Edinburgh on 31 October 1824 the eldest son of James Adam WS of 14 Dublin Street in Edinburgh's New Town. He studied law at the University of Edinburgh.

In 1854 he was a Solicitor of the Supreme Court (SSC).

He was created a Senator of the College of Justice on 6 December 1876 and given the title "Lord Adam".

He lived with his family at 34 Moray Place, a large terraced Georgian townhouse on the Moray Estate in western Edinburgh.

He died at his home in Midlothian on 27 August 1914. He is buried with his family in Dean Cemetery in the west of Edinburgh. The grave lies against the north wall of the northern extension.

== Family ==
He was married to Catharine Beatson Beatson-Bell of Glenfarg, the sister of a legal colleague John Beatson-Bell WS. They had three daughters.
