= John Carmont, Lord Carmont =

Scottish advocate and judge

John Francis Carmont, Lord Carmont (30 October 1880 – 7 August 1965) was a Scottish advocate and judge.

== Early life ==
Carmont was born in Dumfries, the youngest son of James Carmont, an honorary Sheriff substitute. He was educated at the Fort Augustus Abbey until December 1894 when he transferred to St Bede's College, Manchester, for a year. In 1895 he was sent to France to complete his education.

== Early career ==
Upon returning to Dumfries, Carmont served an apprenticeship with a local law firm and qualified as a solicitor in 1903, he then studied further law at Edinburgh University and was called to the bar in 1906, taking silk in 1924 and becoming part of the Scottish Senior Bar.

== Career on the bench ==
In May 1934, Carmont was appointed a Senator of the College of Justice in succession to Lord Sands and took the Judicial Title of Lord Carmont. Lord Carmont remained as a Judge of the Outer House for only three years, after which record period of time he was appointed to the First Division.

In 1952, when razor gangs were running amok in Glasgow, Lord Carmont went there from Edinburgh to preside over the High Court and after warning that future sentences might require to be more severe if the use of razors and other similar weapons did not cease forthwith, he then imposed sentences of up to 10 years' imprisonment on all those who appeared before him convicted of inflicting horrific injuries on others. One week later the Glasgow police had their first weekend since the war without a single slashing or similar attack. This incident resulted in the phrase "Doing a Carmont" entering the language of the underworld and the press.

== Later life and death ==
Lord Carmont continued to sit on the Court of Session until two weeks prior to his death at the age of 85.
