= David Cathcart, Lord Alloway =

British lawyer and judge

David Cathcart, Lord Alloway (1764–1829) was a Scottish lord of session.

== Life ==
He was born in Ayr in January 1764, the son of Edward Cathcart of Greenfield, Ayrshire, and passed advocate at the Scottish bar on 16 July 1785. He was promoted to the bench as an ordinary lord of session on 8 June 1813, on the resignation of Sir William Honyman, assuming the title of Lord Alloway. On the resignation of Lord Hermand, in 1826, he was also appointed a lord of justiciary.

Cathcart died at his seat, Blairston, near Ayr, on 27 April 1829.

He is buried in the ruins of Alloway Kirk.

== Family ==
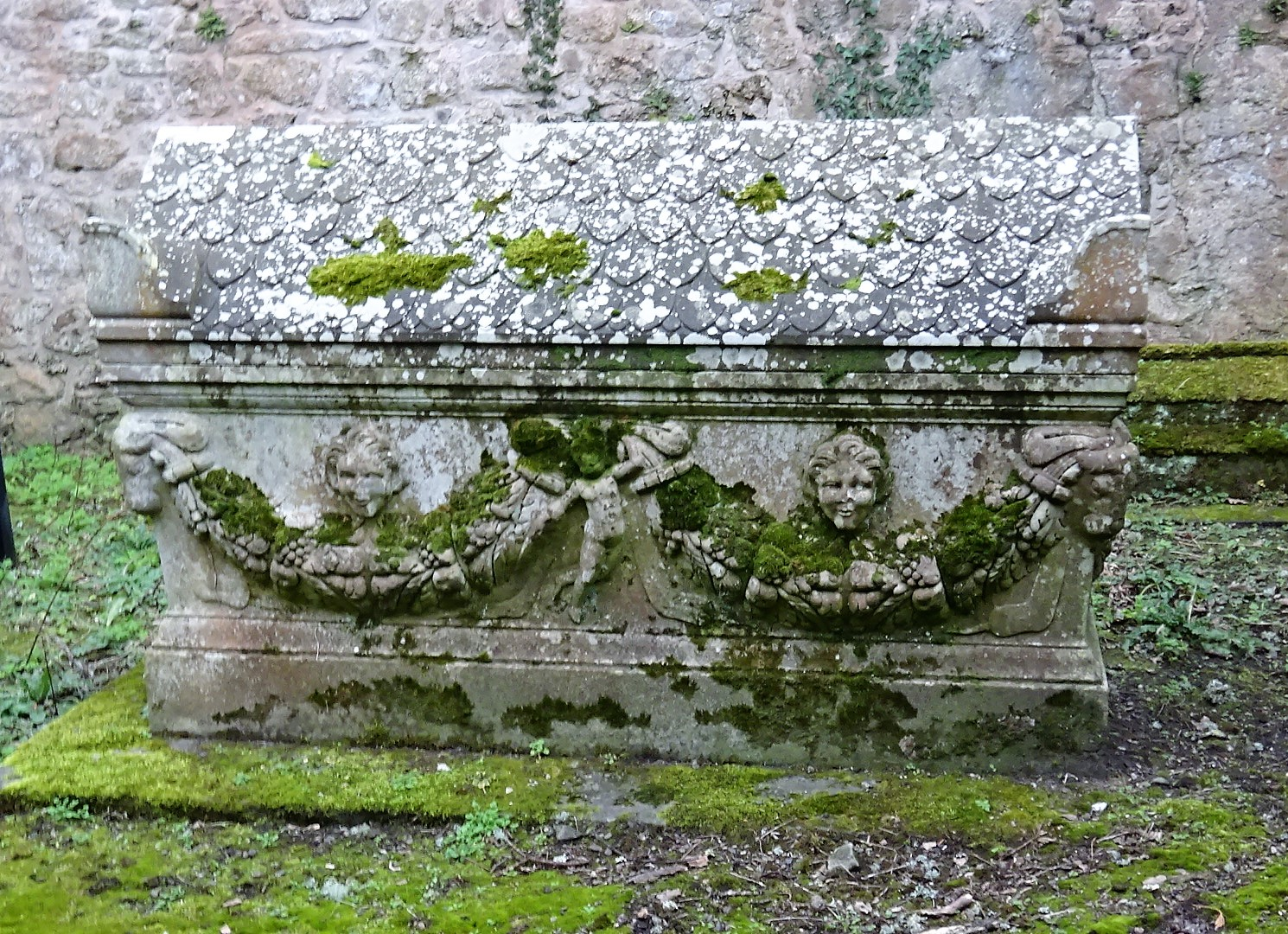
Lord Alloway's Sarcophagus inside Alloway Auld Kirk.

His wife was Mary Muir. Their son, Elias Cathcart of Auchindrane (d.1877), was also an advocate and briefly (1826–39) a Fellow of the Royal Society of Edinburgh.

His children David Cathcart WS (1798–1867), Agnes and Mary are buried in "Lords Row" in Dean Cemetery in Edinburgh.

== Notes ==
Attribution

This article incorporates text from a publication now in the public domain: Stephen, Leslie, ed. (1887). "Cathcart, David". Dictionary of National Biography. Vol. 9. London: Smith, Elder & Co.
