= Alexander Seton, Lord Kilcreuch =

Scottish judge and Senator of the College of Justice

Sir Alexander Seton of Gargunnock and Culcreuch, Lord Kilcreuch (c.1576 – c.1640) was a 16th- and 17th-century Scottish judge and Senator of the College of Justice.

== Life ==
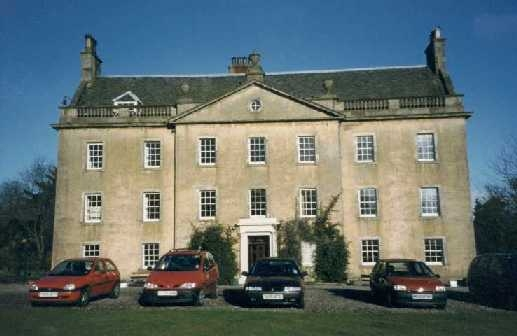
The current Gargunnock House

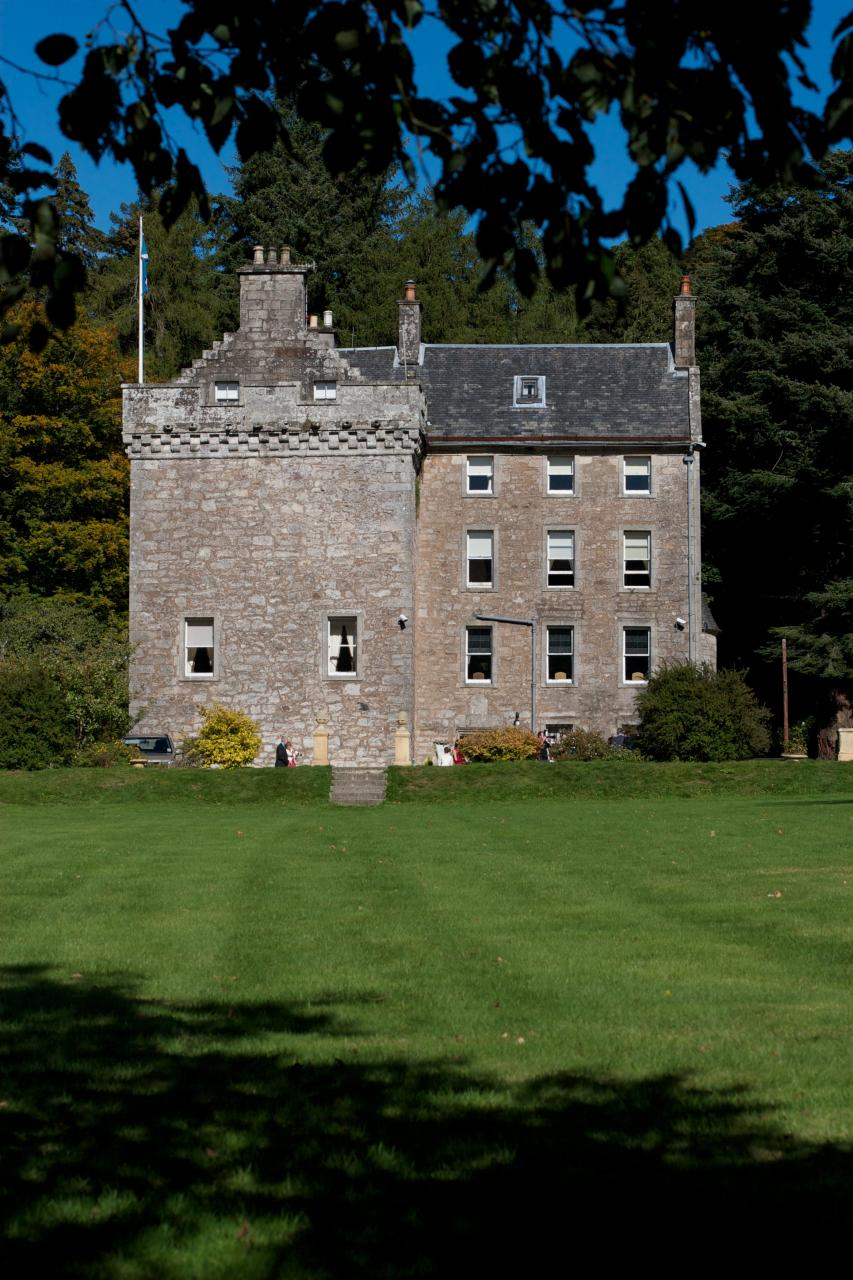
Culcreuch Castle

He was the son of James Seton (b. 1554), 5th Laird of Touch, and Eline (or Jean) Edmondstone daughter of Andrew Edmondstone of Edmondstone House (just south of Edinburgh).

In 1624 he acquired Culcreuch Castle in lieu of monies owed to him by his brother-in-law, Robert Galbraith.

He was elected a Senator of the College of Justice in February 1626 and took the title of Lord Kilcreuch (Culcreuch). He sold Culcreuch to Robert Napier (second son of John Napier of Merchiston) in 1632 in order to be closer to his legal duties in Edinburgh.

In 1633 he was knighted by King Charles I of England at Holyrood Palace.

In 1634 the Gargunnock estate passed to the Earl of Mar.

In 1637 his position as Senator was filled by Adam Cunningham, Lord Woodhall and Lord Kilcreuch is then listed as "retired" rather than dead. This was apparently brought about by blindness.

== Family ==
He was married to Marion Maule, daughter of William Maule of Glaster. They had one son, Alexander Seton of Graden.

== Trivia ==
Culcreuch Castle still survives and is now a hotel.

Gargunnock House was remodelled and formalised in the mid-18th century and is available to let as a holiday experience through the Landmark Trust.
