= William Campbell, Lord Skerrington =

Scottish judge

William Campbell
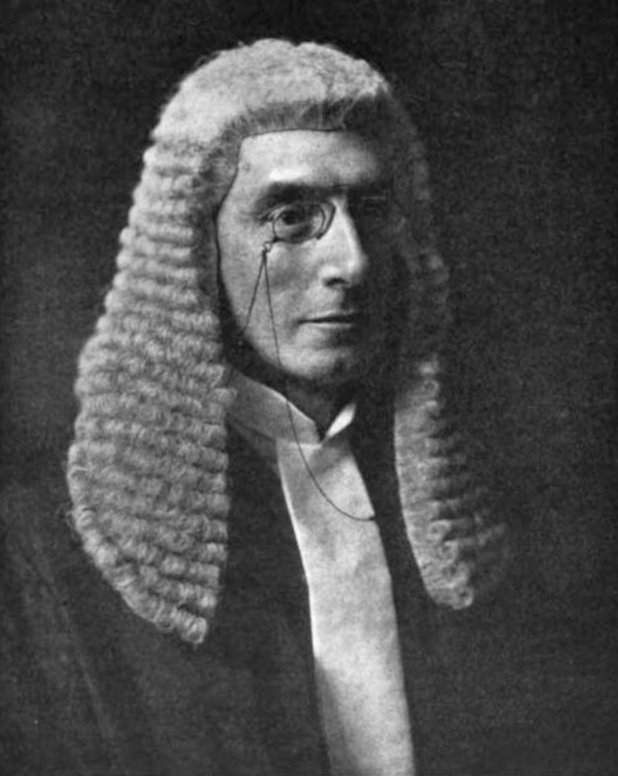
- Born: 27 June 1855
- Died: 21 July 1927 (aged 72); Edinburgh, Scotland
- Education: University of Edinburgh
- Occupation: Judge
- Spouse: Alice Mary Fraser (m. 1880)
- Children: 3

William Campbell, Lord Skerrington (1855–1927) was a Scottish judge. He was the first Catholic judge in the country since the Reformation.

== Life ==
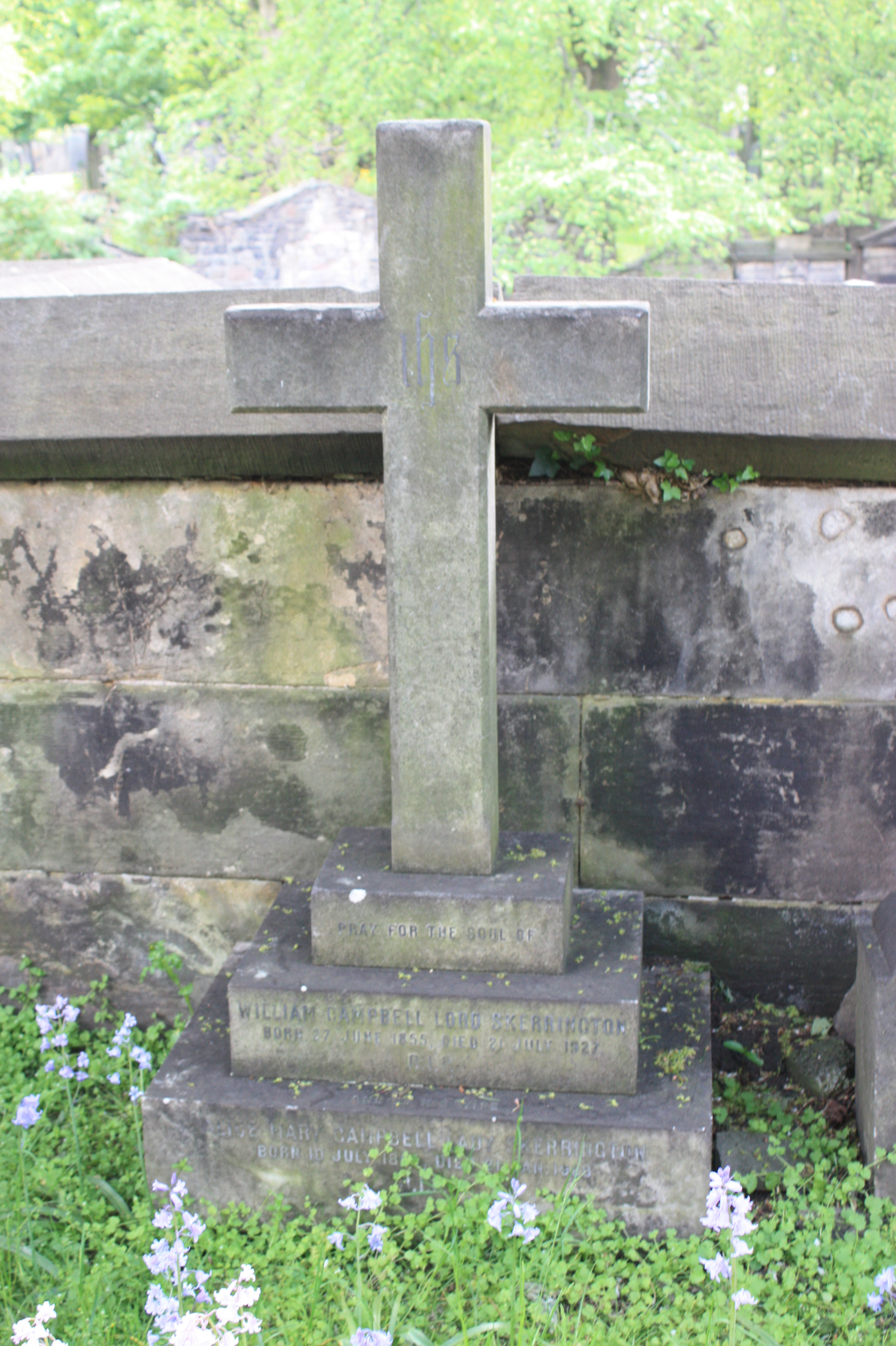
The grave of William Campbell, Lord Skerrington, St Johns Churchyard, Edinburgh

The son of Robert Campbell, a magistrate in Ayrshire, he was born on 27 June 1855. He was educated at Edinburgh Academy and the University of Edinburgh.

From 1905 to 1908, Campbell served as the elected Dean of the Faculty of Advocates. On 15 October 1908 he was created a Senator of the College of Justice and retained the role until 1926.

In later life, he lived at 12 Randolph Crescent in Edinburgh's West End.

He died at his home in Edinburgh on 21 July 1927. He is buried in St Johns Churchyard at the west end of Princes Street in Edinburgh. The grave is marked by a simple stone cross and lies in the lower section.

His biography was written by Francis Caird Inglis.

== Family ==
He married Alice Mary Fraser (d. 1929) in 1880, and they had three children.
