= Christopher Guest, Baron Guest =

British barrister and judge (1901–1984)

The Right Honourable The Lord Guest PC

Lord of Appeal in Ordinary
- In office 1961–1971

Senator of the College of Justice in Scotland
- In office 1957–1961

Personal details
- Born: 7 November 1901 Edinburgh, Scotland
- Died: 25 September 1984 (aged 82) Edinburgh, Scotland

Christopher William Graham Guest, Baron Guest PC (7 November 1901 – 25 September 1984) was a British barrister and judge. Born in Edinburgh, Guest practiced at the Scottish bar, where he acquired a large practice, becoming successively a sheriff in 1952 and Dean of the Faculty of Advocates in 1955. Appointed a Senator of the College of Justice in 1957, he was promoted to be a Lord of Appeal in Ordinary in 1961, retiring in 1971.

== Biography ==
Born in Edinburgh, Guest was educated at Merchiston Castle School, Clare College, Cambridge (MA), and Edinburgh University (LLB). He was admitted to the Faculty of Advocates in 1925 and to the English Bar (Inner Temple) in 1929. During the Second World War, he served in the Army, first in the Royal Artillery and then as a deputy judge-advocate in the War Office, ending the war as a major. He was appointed King's Counsel in 1945 and was appointed Sheriff of Ayr and Bute in 1952, transferring in 1954 to be Sheriff of Perth and Angus. He served as Dean of the Faculty of Advocates from 1955 to 1957.

In 1957, Guest was appointed a Senator of the College of Justice, taking the judicial courtesy title of Lord Guest. On 20 January 1961, he was appointed Lord of Appeal in Ordinary and was created a life peer with the title Baron Guest, of Graden in the County of Berwick. In the same year, Guest was sworn of the Privy Council and in 1971, he retired as Lord of Appeal.
