= General Twining =

General Twining may refer to:

- Merrill B. Twining (1902–1996), U.S. Marine Corps general
- Nathan F. Twining (1897–1982), U.S. Air Force general
- Philip Geoffrey Twining (1862–1920), Canadian-born British Army general
