= Gordon McIntyre =

Gordon McIntyre may refer to:

- Gordon McIntyre (field hockey), Scottish field hockey player
- Gordon McIntyre, Lord Sorn, Scottish lawyer and judge
