= Robert Scott Moncrieff =

Scottish advocate, illustrator and caricaturist (1793-1869)

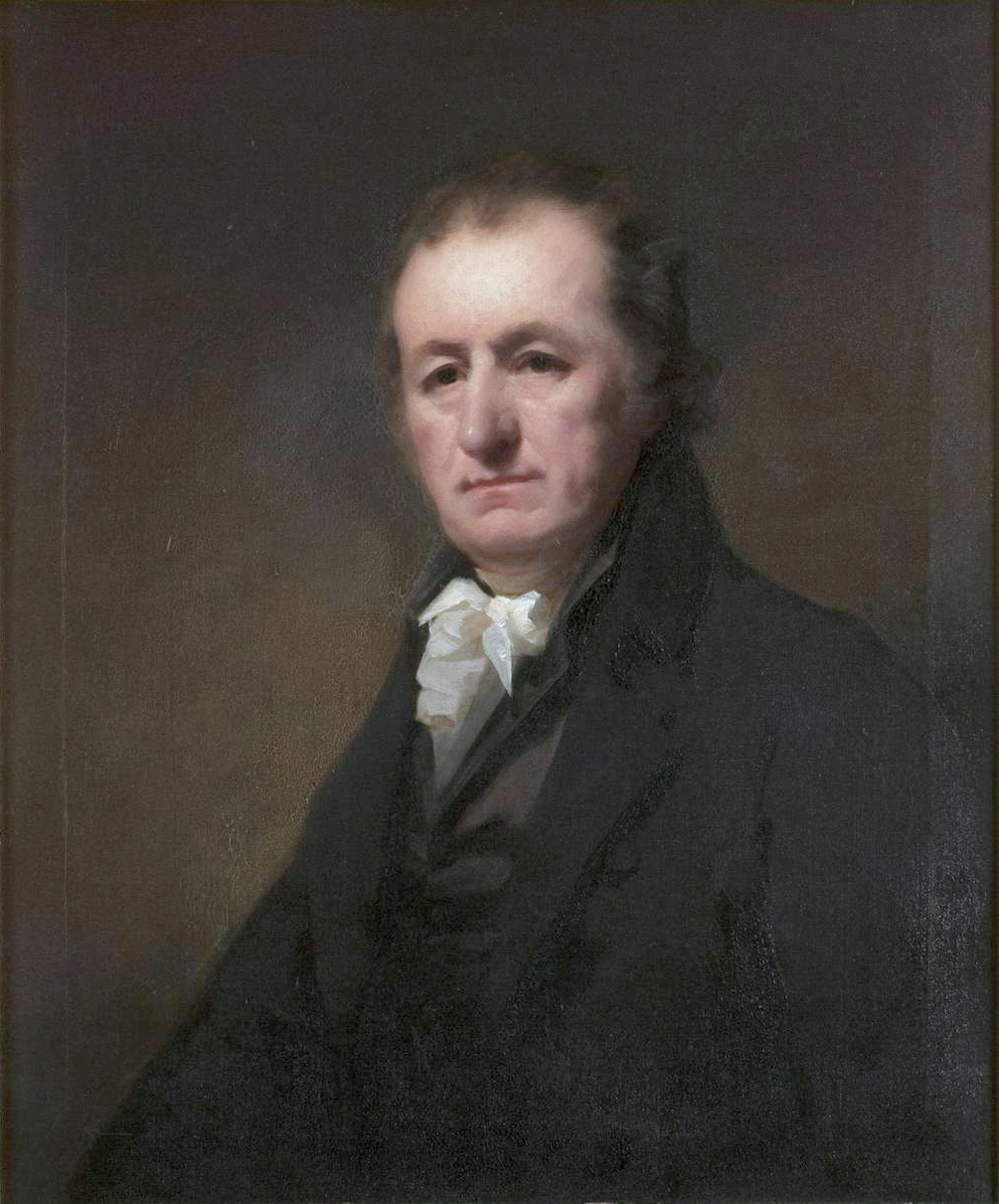
Robert Scott Moncrieff by Sir Henry Raeburn

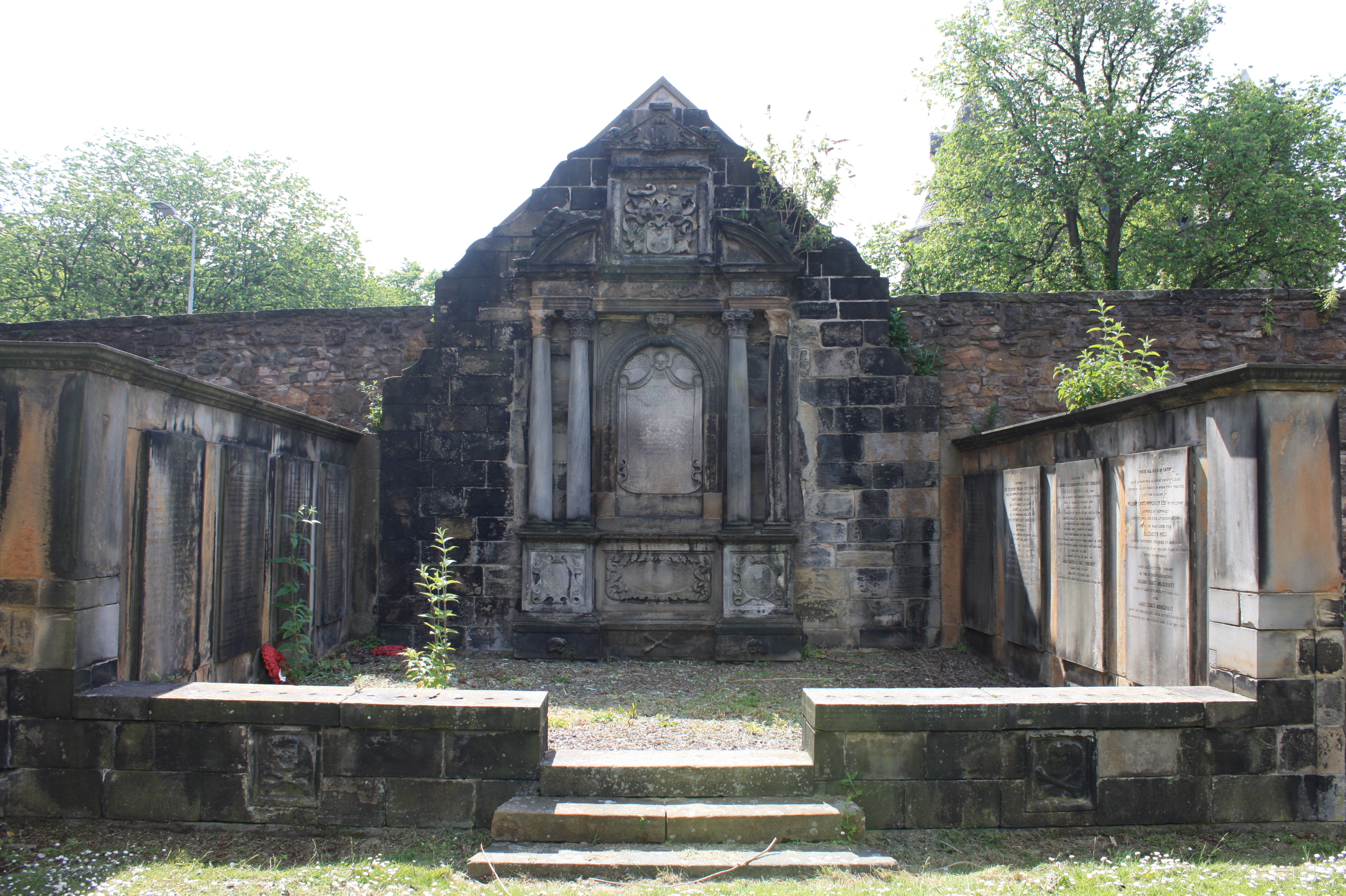
The Scott Moncrieff graves, Greyfriars Kirkyard

Robert Scott Moncrieff (1 December 1793 – 18 June 1869) was a Scottish advocate, amateur illustrator and caricaturist.

== Life ==
He was born in Tullibole Castle near Fossoway on 1 December 1793.

He trained in law at the University of Edinburgh.

Most of his cartoons are of his legal peers and are clearly drawn during court proceedings. Many of his illustrations from the years 1816 to 1820 were included in the 1871 publication The Scottish Bar Fifty Years Ago: Sketches of Scott and His Contemporaries.

From around 1830 he served as Chamberlain to the Duke of Buccleuch at Dalkeith Palace.

He died in Edinburgh on 18 June 1869. He is buried with other members of the Scott Moncrieff family at the south end of the sealed south-west section of Greyfriars Kirkyard commonly called the Covenanter's Prison.

== Family ==
He was married to Susan Pringle (1796–1840) around 1820. They had 11 children several of whom rose to some fame. Susan died soon after the birth of the 11th child. Most of the children, with the notable exceptions of Joanna and Colin, died in middle age or early adulthood.

- Elizabeth (1821–1848) died in India
- Susan (1824–1852) died in Edinburgh, buried in Dean Cemetery
- Alexander Pringle Scott Moncrieff (1827–1865) Major in the Indian Army, died in Benares. Married Elizabeth Coventry daughter of Rev George Coventry and they were parents to Sir George Scott-Moncrieff
- Sir Colin Campbell Scott Moncrieff (1836–1916), Director of Irrigation in Egypt and Under Secretary of State for Scotland, died in Chelsea, London
- Rev. John Edward Scott Moncrieff (1839–1860), died in Batavia.
- Charles the youngest son (1840–1859)
- Joanna Scott-Moncrieff about(1834-1920) married John Archibald Ballard. Mother of 6 children.
- Mary Ann Scott-Moncrieff, (fl. 1862), painted an album of watercolours, which she dedicated to her father

He married his second wife, Mary Elizabeth Hamilton (1811–1885), considerably his junior, around 1845. Their infant daughter, Jane Anne, died in 1852.

Another daughter, Elizabeth Mary (1852-1939) married Rev James Robertson of Whittingehame in East Lothian, who was Moderator of the General Assembly of the Church of Scotland.

== Gallery ==
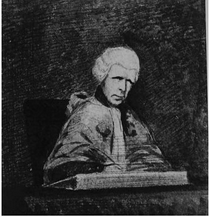

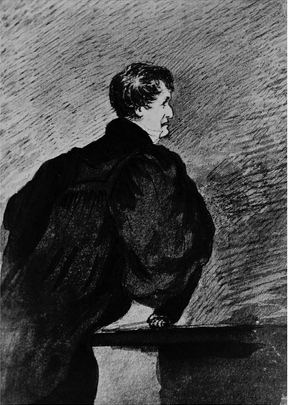

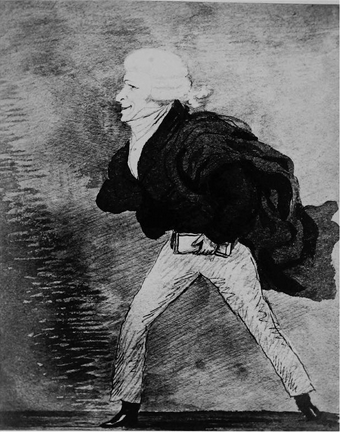

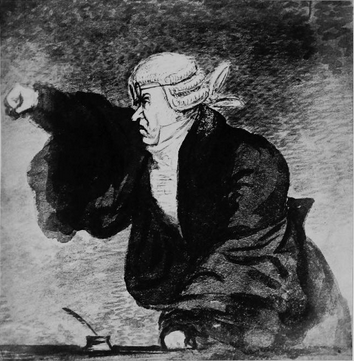

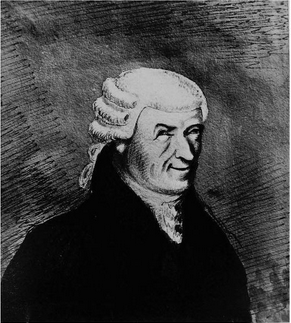
