= Andrew Coventry =

Scottish agriculturist

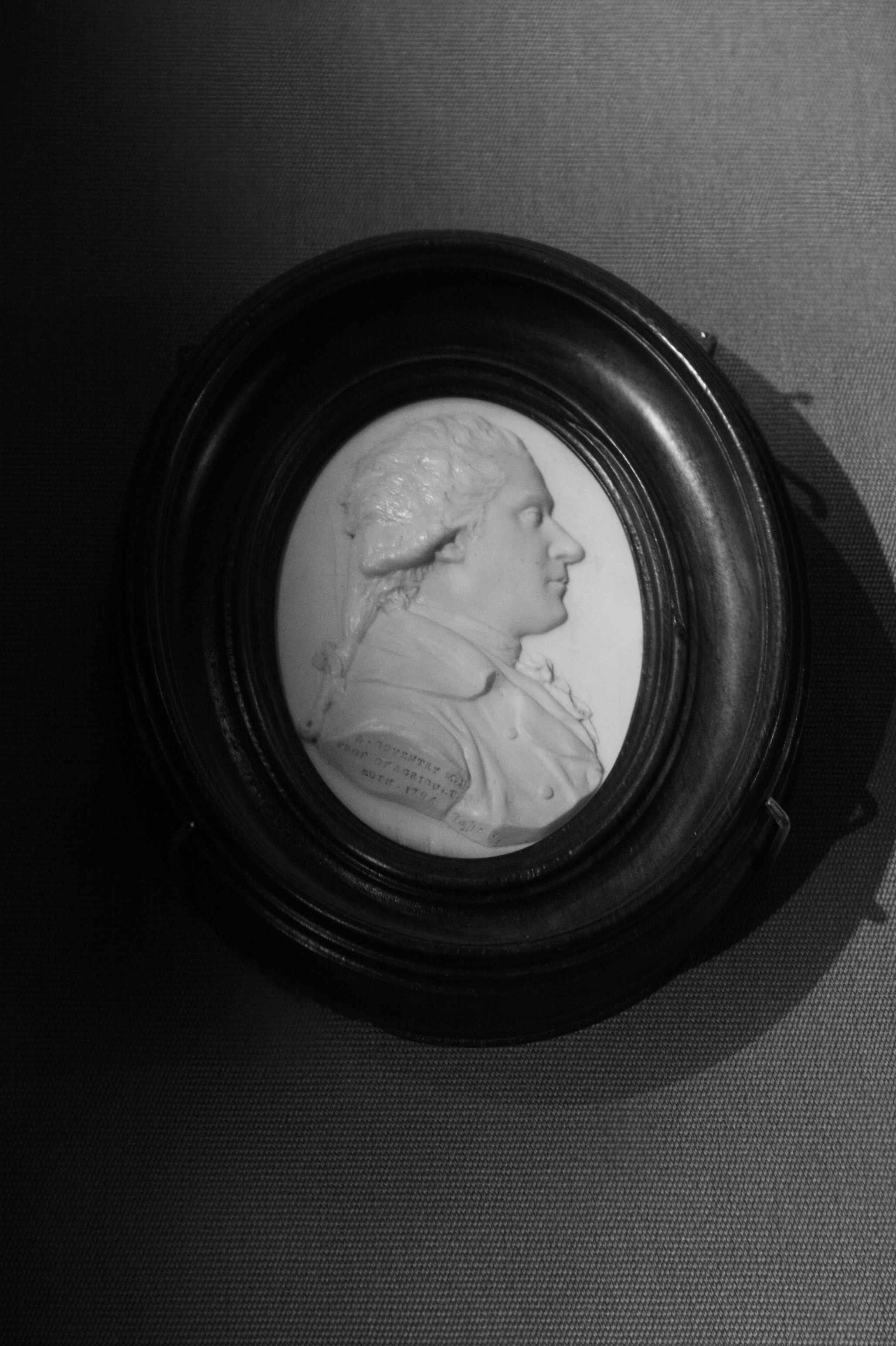
Cameo of Andrew Coventry

Andrew Coventry FRSE (1762–1830) was a Scottish agriculturist. He was the first Professor of Agriculture in Great Britain.

== Life ==
Andrew Coventry, born in February 1762, was eldest son of Rev George Coventry, minister of Stitchell in Roxburghshire. Through his mother, Elizabeth Horn, he inherited the estate of Shanwell, near Kinross, and some other landed property in Perthshire. He was educated at the university of Edinburgh, and on 15 December 1782 elected a member of the Medical Society of Edinburgh. In September 1783 he graduated M.D. for a thesis De Scarlatina Cynanchica. It is not clear whether he ever practised as a physician; but he appears to have specialised in the sciences bearing upon agriculture.

On 7 July 1790 Sir William Pulteney took the first steps towards endowing a chair of agriculture at Edinburgh, and nominated Coventry as the first professor. Occasional lectures on the subject had earlier been delivered by other professors, e.g. by the professor of chemistry, Dr. William Cullen, at the instigation of Lord Kames. A much fuller course had also been given by John Walker, then professor of natural history, in 1788.

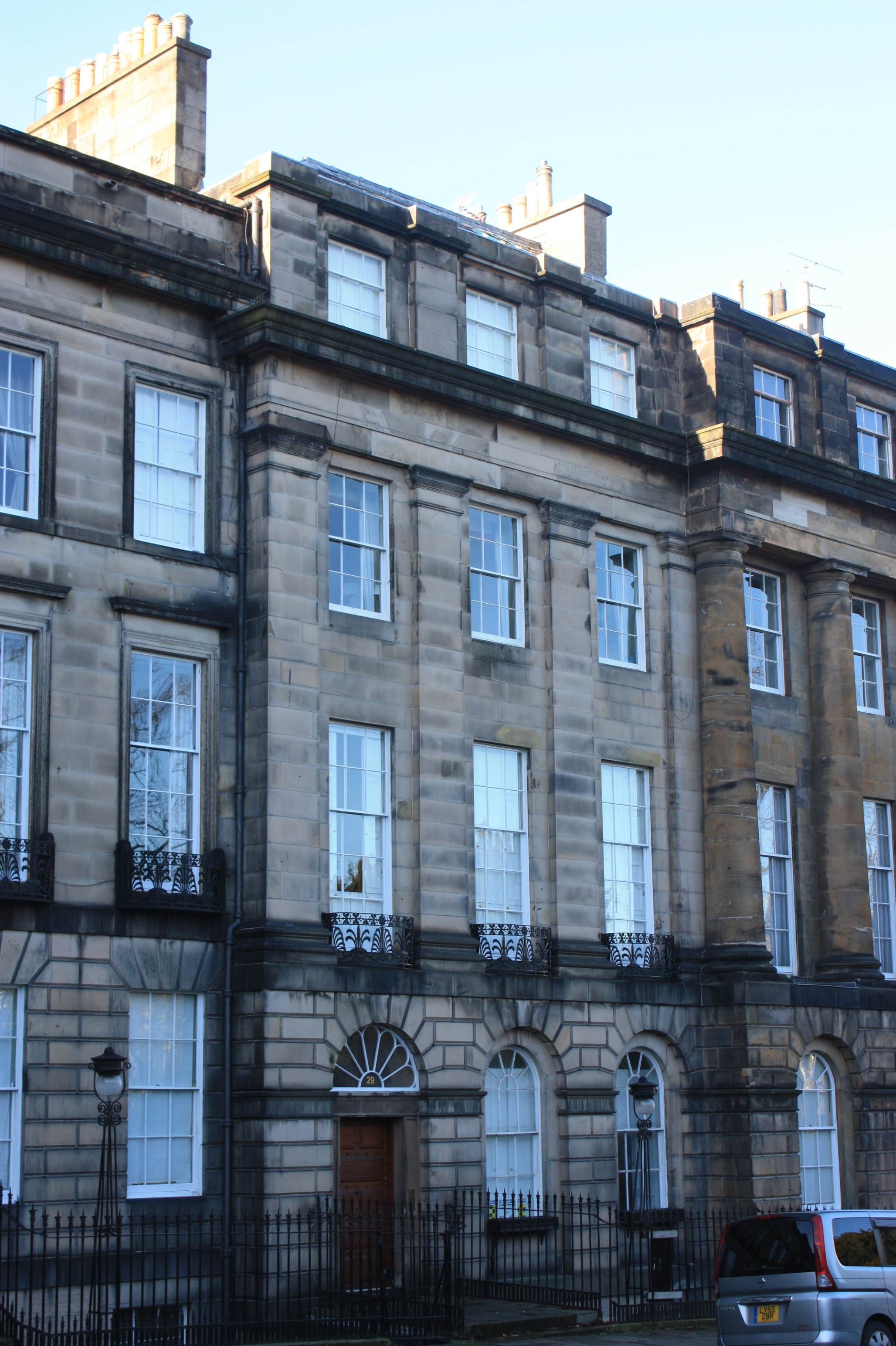
Coventry's large Edinburgh townhouse at 29 Moray Place

The new chair's foundation seems to have been regarded with a good deal of jealousy: the professor of natural history protested that he was not to be hindered thereby from teaching 'any branch of natural science,' to which the professor of botany objected as infringing his rights; Coventry, for his part, insisted that none but himself had the right to give 'a separate course of georgical lectures.' Moreover, the endowment and patronage of a university chair by a private individual was unprecedented at the time, and seems to have aroused opposition.

In spite of these obstacles Coventry became, on 17 November 1790, the first professor of agriculture in the university, and continued to hold the post until 1831. The endowment of the chair amounted to only £50 per annum; but Coventry supplemented his work as a teacher by many other duties. 'He was constantly called on to arbitrate in land questions, and to give evidence before the court of session and before committees of the House of Commons; the drainage of Loch Leven and the reclamation of the surrounding lands were carried out under his directions'. Coventry gave evidence before the royal commission appointed in 1826 to investigate the condition of the universities and colleges of Scotland, when he said that he had delivered thirty-two courses, some of them, consisting of more than 140 lectures each. Although the subject he taught was not available for a degree granting graduation, he had attracted classes varying in number from thirty to seventy-eight.

It is often overlooked that one of his star pupils was none other than John Claudius Loudon, a person that can be safely described as the father of professional horticulture. In fact his, An Encyclopedia of Gardening has been praised by Sir Jeffrey Jellicoe, as

"The first book to treat the subject comprehensively from this historical, technical, aesthetic, and horticultural points of view."

Towards the end of his tenure of office, however, he appears to have lectured only in alternate years, 'persuading persons who wished to attend him during any session when he was to be absent to put off doing so, and to attend the classes of chemistry and botany in the meantime.' The royal commission, which concluded its labours in 1830, recommended among other reforms that the chair of agriculture should be abolished 'unless a class could be provided for it, and taught regularly.'

In 1792 Coventry was elected a Fellow of the Royal Society of Edinburgh. His proposers were Daniel Rutherford, James Gregory, and Sir James Hall. His address was then given as 29 Moray Place, an impressive townhouse on the Moray Estate in western Edinburgh.

In late life Coventry lived at 2 North Charlotte Street, just off Charlotte Square.

Coventry, who was then sixty-nine, accordingly resigned, and was succeeded by David Low (1786–1859) on 16 March 1831. He died on 17 December 1830 and is buried in Buccleuch Churchyard in the south side of the city.

== Family ==
He married twice: firstly to Eliza Hastie in 1790; secondly (following Eliza's death in 1797) he married Martha Cunningham in 1799. By the first marriage he had George Coventry.

By his second marriage he had a son, also Andrew Coventry (1801–1877) who was an advocate and also a Director of the Commercial Bank of Scotland. He followed in his father's footsteps in also being a Fellow of the Royal Society of Edinburgh.

== Works ==
In addition to the thesis referred to above, Coventry wrote:

- Remarks on Live Stock and relative Subjects, 1806 (not in British Museum, but in library of Faculty of Advocates)
- Discourses explanatory of the Object and Plan of the Course of Lectures on Agriculture and Rural Economy, 1808.
- Notes on the Culture and Cropping of Arable Land, 1811.
