= James Pitman, Lord Pitman =

Scottish lawyer

James Campbell Pitman, Lord Pitman LLD (1864–1941) was a 20th-century Scottish lawyer who served as a Senator of the College of Justice.

== Life ==
He was born at 11 Alva Street in Edinburgh the son of Frederick Pitman WS.

In 1900 he is listed as an advocate living at 13 Great Stuart Street in the Moray Estate in west Edinburgh.

In 1911 he is listed as an advocate living at 9 Doune Terrace in the Moray Estate in west Edinburgh.

From 1920 to 1929 he was Sheriff of Caithness. In January 1929 he was appointed a Senator of the College of Justice under the title of Lord Pitman.

Following his death in the spring of 1939, he was replaced as a senator by William Donald Patrick, Lord Patrick.
