= George Scott-Moncrieff (British Army officer) =

British Army general

Major-General Sir George Scott-Moncrieff KCB KCMG CIE
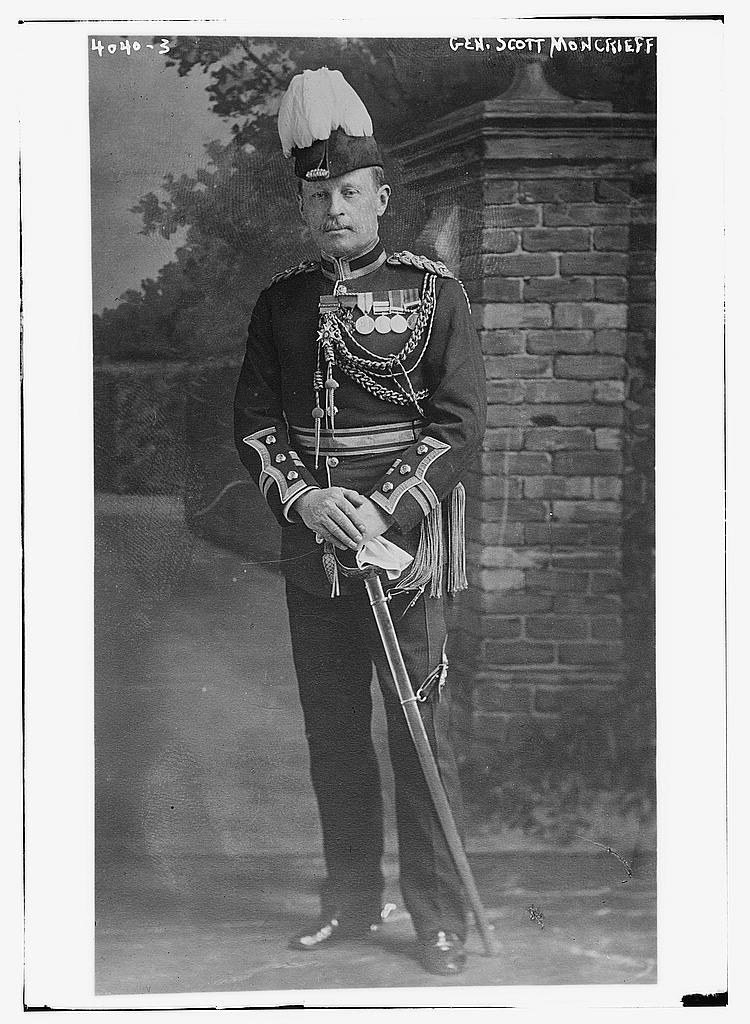
- Scott-Moncrieff in 1916
- Born: George Kenneth Scott-Moncrieff; 3 October 1855; Bengal, British India
- Died: 4 June 1924 (aged 68)

Major-General Sir George Kenneth Scott-Moncrieff KCB KCMG CIE (3 October 1855 – 4 June 1924) was a British Army officer and engineer.

== Early life ==
Scott-Moncrieff was born in Bengal, British India, the younger son of Major Alexander Pringle Scott-Moncrieff, of the 44th Bengal Infantry, and of Elizabeth Hastie Coventry, younger daughter of the Rev. George Coventry, of Shanwell, Kinross-shire. His father was the second of seven sons born to Robert Scott Moncrieff (1793–1869); his younger brother was the distinguished engineer Sir Colin Scott-Moncrieff (1836–1916).

== Career ==
Scott-Moncrieff joined the Royal Engineers in March 1874 and served in Afghanistan from 1878–1880. He was an Instructor at the School of Military Engineering from 1893–1898. He was Commander of the Royal Engineers, China Expeditionary Force 1900–1901, taking part in the relief of Peking and the Waziristan expedition on the North West Frontier, India 1901–1902.

He was Assistant Director, Fortifications and Works, Army Headquarters 1909–1911, and Director, Fortifications and Works, War Office 1911–1918. He was promoted to the rank of major-general on 1 October 1912, following the retirement of Major-General Richard M. Ruck. He retired in 1918.

He was appointed a Companion of the Order of the Indian Empire in 1901 for services in China, a Companion of the Order of the Bath in the 1907 Birthday Honours and a Knight Commander of the Order of the Bath (KCB) in the 1915 Birthday Honours. He was appointed a Knight Commander of the Order of St Michael and St George (KCMG) in 1918 for valuable services rendered in connection with the War.

== Selected works ==
- The Royal Engineers Field-Service Pocket-Book. 1894.
- The Water Supply of Barracks and Cantonments. Mackay. 1896.
- The Principles of Structural Design. W. & J. Mackay & Co. [for] the Royal Engineers Institute.; vol. 1 (1897); vol. 2 (1898)
- Recent Works in the N. W. Frontier Province, India. 1905.
- Eastern Missions From a Soldier's Standpoint. 1907.
- Works Economics. 1910.
- Field Entrenchments: Spadework for Riflemen, Hasty Fire Cover, Fire Trenches, Communications, Concealment, Obstruction, Shelters. 1914.
- "The Hutting Problem in the War" (PDF). The Royal Engineers Journal: 361–380. 1924.
- "Major-General Sir George Kenneth Scott-Moncreiff KCB KCMG CIE MICE" (PDF). The Royal Engineers Journal: 492–497. 1924.
- Canals & Campaigns: An Engineer Officer in India, 1877-1885. British Association for Cemeteries in South Asia. 1987.

Military offices
Preceded by Frederick Rainsford-Hannay	Director of Fortifications and Works; 1911–1918	Succeeded by Philip Geoffrey Twining
