= William Donald Patrick, Lord Patrick =

Scottish advocate who served with the Royal Flying Corps

The Right Honourable Lord Patrick PC, FRSE
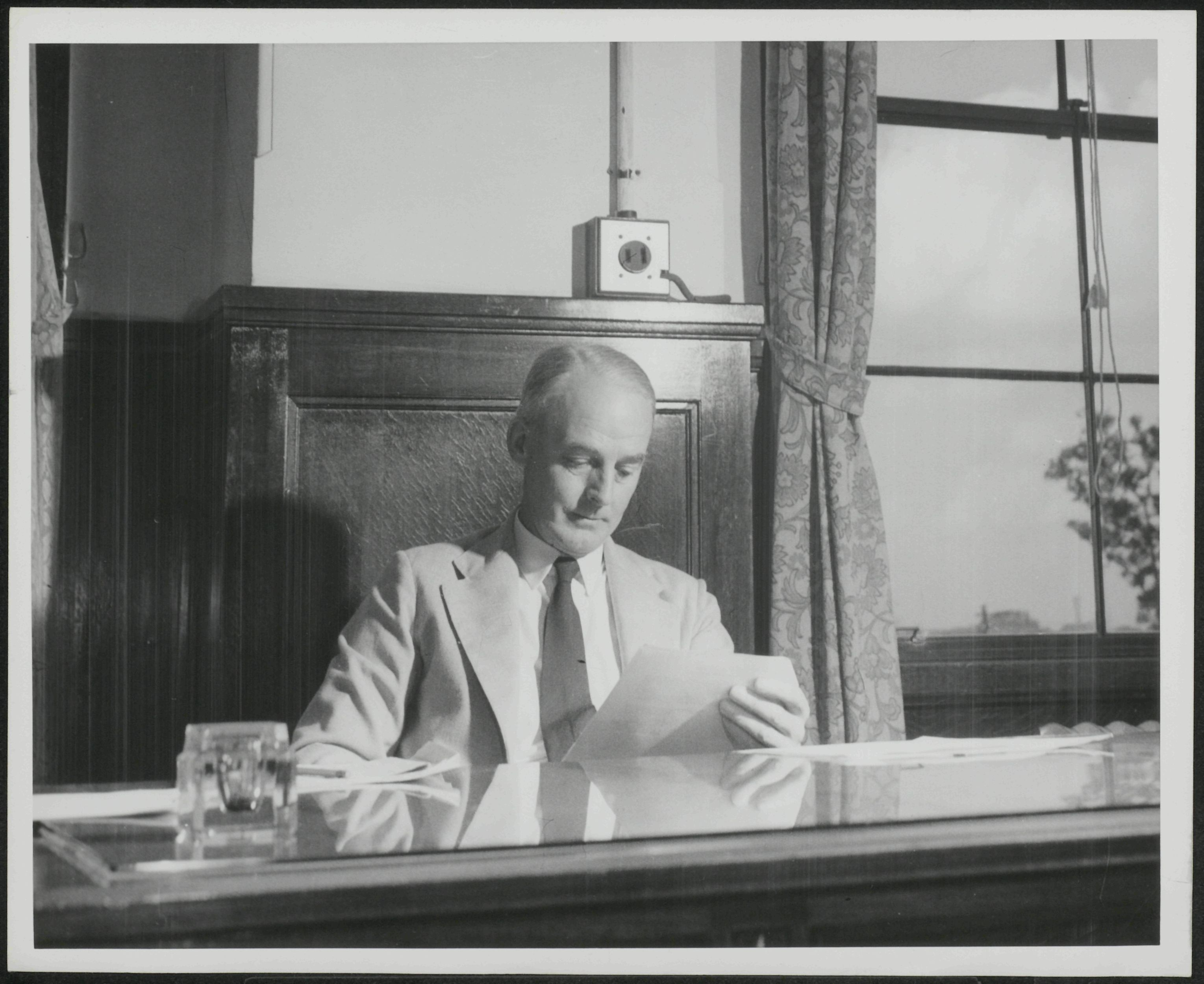

Senator of the College of Justice
- In office 1939–1963
- Monarchs: George VI; Elizabeth II

Dean of the Faculty of Advocates
- In office 1937–1939
- Preceded by: James Keith
- Succeeded by: James Gordon McIntyre

Personal details
- Born: William Donald Patrick; 24 December 1889 Dalry, Ayrshire
- Died: 17 February 1967 (aged 77) Edinburgh
- Relations: William Patrick (father); Anne Patrick (mother)
- Education: University of Glasgow
- Profession: Advocate

William Donald Patrick, Lord Patrick, PC, FRSE (24 December 1889 – 17 February 1967) was a Scottish advocate who served with the Royal Flying Corps during World War I. After the war, he returned to practice law with great success, and became a judge in 1939, as a Senator of the College of Justice. After World War II, he was one of the 12 judges of the Tokyo War Crimes Trial at the end of the Second World War.

== Early life ==
Patrick was born in Dalry, Ayrshire, the son of William Smith Neil Patrick, Sheriff Clerk of Ayr and his wife Anne. His father was sheriff clerk of Ayrshire.

William was educated at the High School of Glasgow and then studied law at the University of Glasgow, graduating with an MA in 1909 and LLB in 1912.

== Career ==
Patrick was admitted to the Faculty of Advocates in 1913.

When the First World War began in 1914, Patrick joined the Royal Flying Corps. He was commissioned as a second lieutenant in July 1916, and later promoted to captain and then flight commander. He was posted to No. 1 Squadron in 1917, and became an air ace having claimed seven victories against German aircraft between October 1917 and March 1918. He was shot down by ground fire behind enemy lines near Messines on 10 April 1918, and became a prisoner of war at Holzminden.

After the war, he continued with his legal career, becoming standing counsel to the Department of Agriculture for Scotland, and an advocate depute (prosecutor) in the sheriff courts in 1929. After taking silk in August 1933, his acuity and forensic skills led to high demand for his services as a King's Counsel, and he led in some high-profile cases. The Clune Moor grouse case, the Bute right-of-way case, and the Inverailort deer-stalking case all aroused wide interest.

In June 1937 Patrick was unanimously elected as Dean of the Faculty of Advocates, replacing James Keith who had become a judge. His appointment was greeted with "unfeigned pleasure" by the Lord President Lord Normand.

In 1939 he became a judge at the Court of Session and Senator of the College of Justice under the title of Lord Patrick following the death of James Pitman, Lord Pitman. From 1946 to 1948 he represented the United Kingdom at the International Military Tribunal for the Far East, where 28 Japanese military and political leaders were tried on charges of war crimes. After returning to Scotland, he joined the Second Division of the Inner House at the Court of Session. He became a Privy Councillor in 1949. In the same year Glasgow University awarded him an honorary doctorate (LLD).

In 1950 he was elected a Fellow of the Royal Society of Edinburgh. His proposers were Sir Robert Muir, Sir Ernest Wedderburn, Thomas Mackay Cooper, Lord Cooper, Sir William Wright Smith and Douglas Guthrie.

== Death ==
Lord Patrick died in Edinburgh on 17 February 1967, aged 77. He was unmarried and had no children.
