= Robert MacFarlane, Lord Ormidale =

Scottish law lord (1802-1880)

The Hon. Robert MacFarlane, Lord Ormidale FRSE (30 July 1802 – 3 November 1880) was a Scottish lawyer and a Senator of the College of Justice. In 1868 he brought about a reform in the Court of Session ending technicalities in pleading, to try to focus upon justice in its broadest sense.

== Life ==
He was born in Glen Douglas near Luss in Dunbartonshire on 30 July 1802, the son of Anne Campbell (1771–1827) and Parlane MacFarlane (1771–1827). He was christened in Luss on 25 August 1802.

He studied law at the University of Glasgow (1816–1819) and the University of Edinburgh (1819–1821), and was apprenticed to James Greig WS at 9 Abercromby Place in Edinburgh. He was created a Writer to the Signet (WS) in 1827. After spending some years in Jamaica he returned to Scotland and was created an advocate in 1838. Successful in civil cases he was created Sheriff of Renfrewshire in 1853. In 1862 he was created a Lord of Session and given the title Lord Ormidale.

In 1863 he was elected a Fellow of the Royal Society of Edinburgh his proposer being John Hutton Balfour. At this time he was living at 14 Moray Place, a huge Georgian townhouse on the Moray Estate in west Edinburgh.

He died at Hartrigge House in Jedburgh on 3 November 1880. He is buried with his wife, who predeceased him, in Warriston Cemetery in north Edinburgh.

== Family ==
On 21 October 1843 he married Grace Addison Greig (1827–1880) from Eccles, Berwickshire, the daughter of his employer, James Greig WS. They had eight children. Their son George Lewis MacFarlane (1854–1941) also became a Senator of the College of Justice, as the second Lord Ormidale in 1910.

== Publications ==
- The Practice of the Court of Session in Jury Cases (1837)
- Practical Notes on the Structure of Issues in Jury Cases (1844)

== Arms ==
Coat of arms of Robert MacFarlane, Lord Ormidale

Crest
A demi-savage grasping in the dexter hand a sheath of arrows and pointing with to the sinister to an imperial crown.
Escutcheon
Quarterly 1st & 4th Argent a saltire wavy between four roses Gules 2nd & 3rd Gules a chevron between cinquefoils in chief and a sword paleways in base Argent.
Motto
This Do I Defend
