= John Wilson (agriculturalist) =

British agriculturist (1812–1888)

John Wilson FRSE FGS FCS (November 1812 – 27 March 1888) was a British agriculturalist.

== Life ==
He was born in London in November 1812, the son of John Wilson and his wife, Matilda. He studied at University College, London, with postgraduate studies of medicine and chemistry in Paris under Anselme Payen, Jean-Baptiste Boussingault and Gay Lussac.

In 1846 Wilson became Principal of the Royal Agricultural College in Cirencester. In 1847 he was elected a Fellow of the Royal Society of Edinburgh. His proposer was John Haldane. He resigned his post at Cirencester in 1850, being replaced by the Rev. John Sayer Haygarth.

In 1854 Wilson replaced Prof David Low as Professor of Agriculture and Rural Economy at Edinburgh University. In 1886 Edinburgh University awarded him an honorary doctorate (LLD). In Edinburgh he lived at 3 Whitehouse Terrace in the Grange. In 1868 he succeeded Philip Kelland as Secretary to the Edinburgh University Senate.

Wilson retired in 1885 and died at Sandfield in Tunbridge Wells on 27 March 1888.

== Publications ==
- The Agriculture of the French Exhibition (1855)
- Agriculture: Past and Present (1855)
- Our Farm Crops (1860)
- Report on the Present State of Agriculture in Scotland (1878)

== Artistic recognition ==
The Scottish National Portrait Gallery holds a sketch of Wilson teaching by William Hole dated 1884.
