= James Keith, Baron Keith of Avonholm =

British senior judge and Lord of Appeal

The Right Honourable The Lord Keith of Avonholm PC
- Lord Keith of Avonholm in 1954 by Walter Stoneman

Lord of Appeal in Ordinary
- In office 1953–1961

Senator of the College of Justice
- In office 1937–1953

Dean of the Faculty of Advocates
- In office 1936–1937
- Preceded by: William Chree
- Succeeded by: William Donald Patrick

Personal details
- Born: James Keith; 20 May 1886 Hamilton, Lanarkshire
- Died: 29 June 1964 (aged 78)
- Relations: Sir Henry Shanks Keith (father)
- Education: Hamilton Academy
- Alma mater: University of Glasgow
- Profession: Advocate

James Keith, Baron Keith of Avonholm, PC (20 May 1886 – 29 June 1964) was a British advocate and judge. He served as a Lord of Session from 1937 to 1953, and then as a Law Lord until 1961.

== Early life and career ==
His grandfather and namesake, James Keith (17 April 1825 – 21 March 1901) and his father, Sir Henry Shanks Keith (26 Dec. 1852 – 9 July 1944) both served as Provosts of Hamilton, Lanarkshire, Scotland; his father also being appointed a Deputy Lieutenant and Honorary Sheriff of Lanarkshire. His family owned the large high-end grocery business, Keith's of Hamilton, operating from substantial premises on the town's Cadzow Street (the building remains.)

The young James Keith was brought up at Avonholm, Hamilton and was educated at the Hamilton Academy and the University of Glasgow, where he took a First in History (M.A.) and a LL.B. He was admitted to the Faculty of Advocates in 1911. During World War I, he joined the Seaforth Highlanders, and was wounded in France. He was later attached to the Egyptian Army and served with the Sudanese government.

After the War, Keith returned to the Scottish bar, and took silk in 1926. In 1936 he was elected as Dean of the Faculty of Advocates.

== Judicial career ==
In 1937, Keith was appointed a Senator of the College of Justice, taking the judicial courtesy title of Lord Keith. In 1953, he was made a Lord of Appeal in Ordinary, and was created a life peer, as Baron Keith of Avonholm, of Saint Bernard's in the City of Edinburgh. He was sworn in the Privy Council the same year. As a Law Lord, he dissented in 22% of the cases which he heard – a larger percentage than that of his famously radical contemporary, Lord Denning. He retired in 1961.

== Children ==
On 7 July 1915 James Keith married Jean Maitland Bennett. The couple had three children –

- The Hon. Elizabeth Hamilton Keith
- The Hon. Helena Stewart Keith
- The Hon. Henry Keith (7 Feb. 1922 – 21 June 2002), who also became a Lord of Appeal in Ordinary, taking the title of The Hon. The Lord Keith of Kinkel.
