= George Lewis MacFarlane =

Scottish lawyer

George Lewis MacFarlane, Lord Ormidale LLD (1854–1941) was a Scottish lawyer who served as a Senator of the College of Justice.

== Life ==
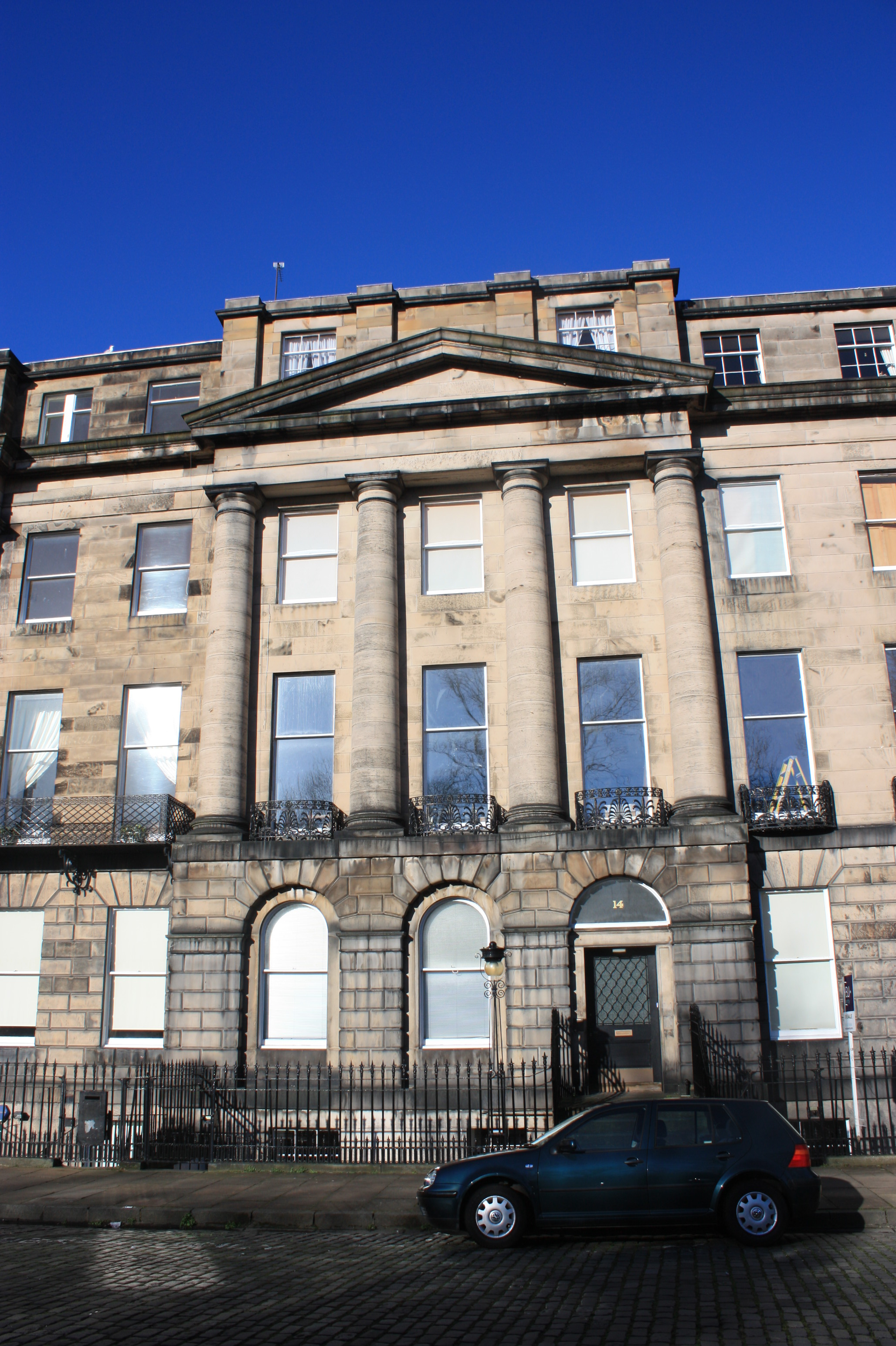
14 Moray Place, Edinburgh

He was born at 31 Heriot Row in Edinburgh on 22 March 1854, the son of Robert MacFarlane WS (1802-1880) and Grace Addison Greig (1827-1880). He was christened on 6 May. He was educated in Edinburgh then studied law at St John's College, Cambridge. He was called to the Scottish Bar as an advocate in 1878.

In 1880 he is listed as George L. MacFarlane, advocate, living at 14 Moray Place on the highly prestigious Moray Estate in Edinburgh, having inherited the property from his father.

He took silk in 1903 and was thereafter G L MacFarlane KC (King's Counsel) and was also made Sheriff of Fife and Kinross in 1909. He was also Commissioner in Lunacy for Scotland (having the final say as to whether or not individuals were committed to an asylum.

In 1910 he was elected a Senator of the College of Justice replacing Alexander Low, Lord Low. He was at this time living a 3 St Colme Street (also on the Moray Estate). He re-adopted the title Lord Ormidale which had been dormant since the death of his father in 1880 (it was NOT an inherited title).

He died on 21 April 1941.

== Family ==
In 1891 he married Mary Crichton Hunter of 49 Moray Place - the daughter of his neighbour.

They had two sons, Robert MacFarlane and Alistair Hunter MacFarlane.

== Recognition ==
Ormidale Terrace in the Murrayfield district of Edinburgh is named after Lord Ormidale.
