= Gordon McIntyre, Lord Sorn =

Scottish lawyer and judge

The Honourable Lord Sorn Gordon McIntyre
- McIntyre in 1959

Senator of the College of Justice
- In office 1944–1963
- Appointed by: George VI
- Preceded by: Thomas Graham Robertson, Lord Robertson
- Succeeded by: Manuel Kissen, Lord Kissen

Dean of the Faculty of Advocates
- In office 1939–1945
- Preceded by: William Donald Patrick, Lord Patrick
- Succeeded by: James Reid, Baron Reid

Personal details
- Born: James Gordon McIntyre; 21 July 1896 Glasgow, Scotland
- Died: 1 July 1983 (aged 86)
- Spouse: Madeline Scott Moncrieff
- Children: 2
- Education: Glasgow University
- Profession: Advocate

James Gordon McIntyre, Lord Sorn, MC & Bar (21 July 1896 – 1 July 1983) was a Scottish lawyer and judge who served as a Senator of the College of Justice. He was also a decorated war hero from the First World War. He was generally known by his middle name, Gordon.

== Life ==
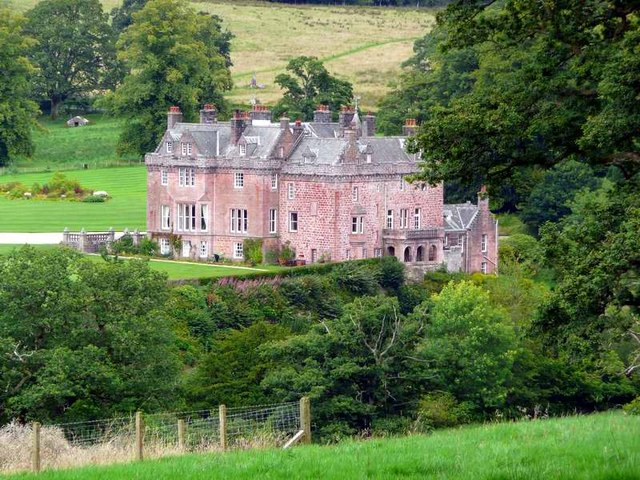
Sorn Castle

He was born in Glasgow on 21 July 1896, the son of Thomas McIntyre and Jeanie Paterson. He had three sisters. His father purchased Sorn Castle in 1908 and began remodelling it in 1909. His father owned a shipping line and was Chairman of Lloyds Register but abandoned many of his business activities to concentrate on the estate. Gordon, as he was generally known, was educated at Winchester College.

In the First World War he joined at the outset (aged 18), serving in the Ayrshire Yeomanry. He undertook a short period of officer training then joined the Gallipoli campaign. There he was badly injured in the shoulder in a trench and was rescued by his sergeant. Following recovery, he went to the trenches of the Somme. Here won the Military Cross for capturing a machine gun post. He later won a bar to the medal and also was awarded the Croix de Guerre. He later lost a leg in a grenade attack.

After the war he went to Balliol College, Oxford where he gained a BA in 1921. He then studied law at Glasgow University graduating LLB in 1923. Passing the Scottish Bar he became an advocate and became King's Counsel (KC) in 1936. From 1939 to 1944 he was dean of the Faculty of Advocates.

On the death of his father in 1920 he inherited Sorn Castle.

In November 1944 he was elected a Senator of the College of Justice with the title Lord Sorn, to replace Thomas Graham Robertson, Lord Robertson.

He retired in 1963 and died on 1 July 1983. He is buried with his father in Sorn churchyard.

== Family ==
In 1923, McIntyre married Madeline Scott Moncrieff, a daughter of Robert Scott Moncrieff, of Perthshire, a practising writer to the signet. They had two children, Robert Gordon and Olivia.
