= John Corse Scott =

Scottish writer and physician

John Corse Scott FRS (born Corse; 12 July 1756 – 12 September 1840) was a Scottish surgeon in the Indian Medical Service, a naturalist, and landowner in Lanarkshire.

== Life ==
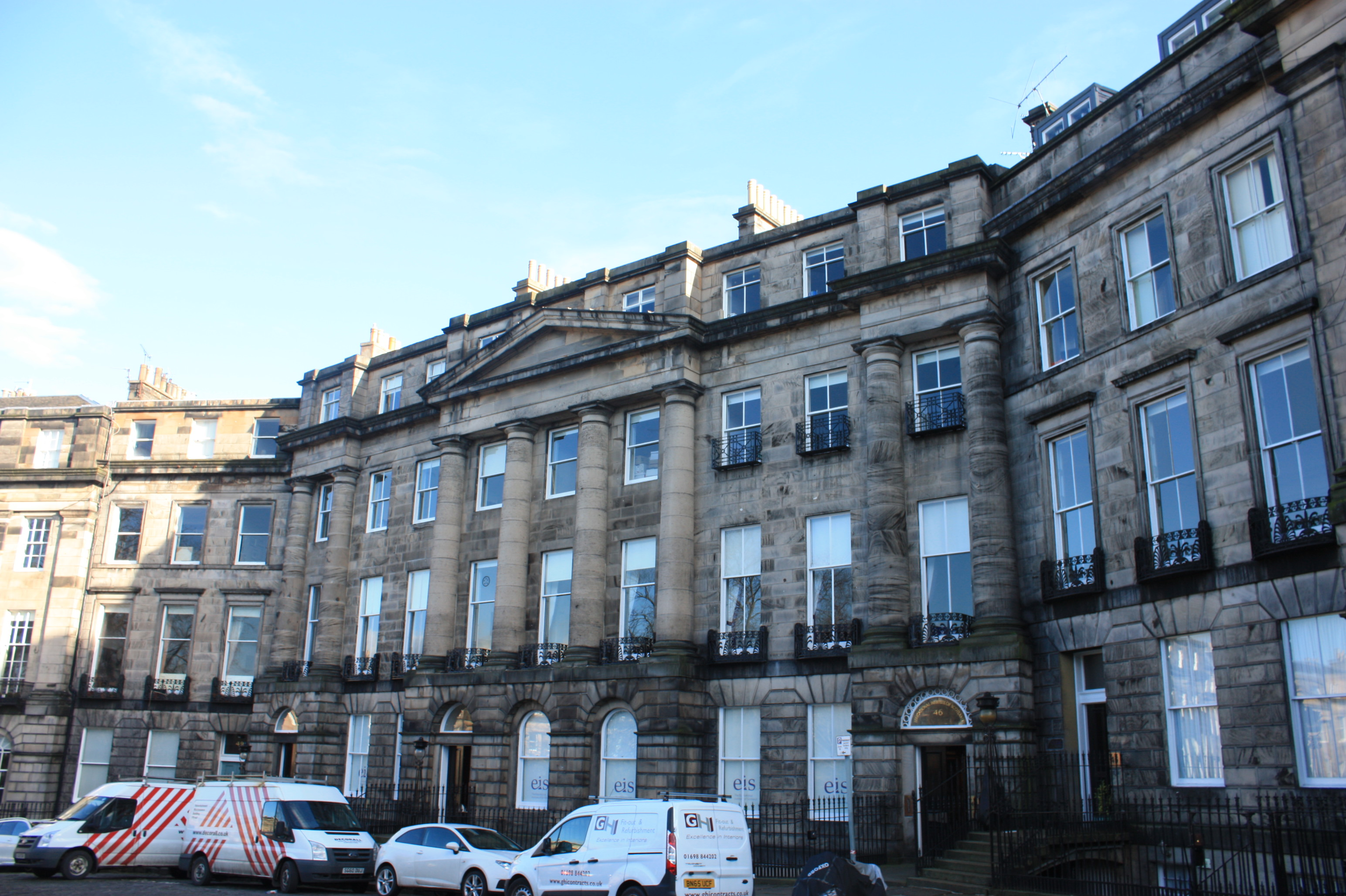
48 Moray Place

John Corse of Bughtrig was born in 1756, the son of Richard Corse and Marion Stark. The Corses of Bughtrig were a cadet of the family of Carmyle, Lanarkshire. On 1 September 1779, Corse joined the British Navy as a Hospital Mate (loblolly boy) assigned to the South Fencible Regiment and served in that capacity until the regiment was disbanded in April 1783. He was also an Ensign from 1781 to April 1783. He obtained his Certificate of Corporation of Surgeons in 1783. Corse was promoted to Assistant Surgeon on 22 May 1796 and to Surgeon on 22 May 1796. In 1799 his article Observations on the different Species of Asiatic Elephants, and their Mode of Dentition was published. According to one source, he retired from the Indian Medical Service on 30 July 1800. On 16 January 1800, he was elected F.R.S.

In 1800, he married Catherine Scott of Sinton (or Synton) and changed his name to John Corse Scott (or Corse-Scott) of Sinton. The marriage produced six sons and three daughters. In the 1820s he was a member of the board of directors of the Edinburgh Oil Gas-Light Company.

In the 1830s, he lived at 48 Moray Place, a huge Georgian townhouse on the Moray Estate in western Edinburgh. He died in Ashkirk, Roxburghshire.
