= Henry Keith, Baron Keith of Kinkel =

British judge and Lord of Appeal

The Right Honourable The Lord Keith of Kinkel GBE PC

Lord of Appeal in Ordinary
- In office 10 January 1977 – 30 September 1996
- Monarch: Elizabeth II
- Preceded by: The Lord Kilbrandon
- Succeeded by: The Lord Hope of Craighead

Member of the House of Lords
- Lord Temporal
- Lord of Appeal in Ordinary; 10 January 1977 – 21 June 2002

Personal details
- Born: Henry Shanks Keith; 7 February 1922
- Died: 21 June 2002 (aged 80)
- Occupation: Judge
- Profession: Barrister

Henry Shanks "Harry" Keith, Baron Keith of Kinkel (7 February 1922 – 21 June 2002), was a British barrister and judge. The son of a law lord, Keith fought in the Second World War before practising at the Scottish bar. Appointed a sheriff in 1970, he became a Senator of the College of Justice the following year. In 1977, he followed in his father's footsteps when he was appointed a Lord of Appeal in Ordinary. He was Senior Law Lord from 1989 to 1996, when he retired. For his public and administrative work, he was appointed a Knight Grand Cross of the Order of the British Empire in 1997.

== Biography ==
The son of James Keith, Baron Keith of Avonholm, Harry Keith was educated in the Edinburgh Academy, at Magdalen College, Oxford, from which he graduated with a Master of Arts degree, and the University of Edinburgh, from which he graduated with a Bachelor of Laws degree. In the Second World War, he was an officer in the Scots Guards and was mentioned in dispatches, reaching the rank of captain. He was admitted to the Faculty of Advocates in 1950, and was made a Queen's Counsel in 1962. In 1951, he had been called to the English Bar at Gray's Inn, where he became a bencher in 1976.

He was appointed as Sheriff of Roxburgh, Berwick and Selkirk in 1970, succeeding David Brand. He was appointed a Senator of the College of Justice with the judicial courtesy title Lord Keith in 1971.

On 10 January 1977, he was appointed Lord of Appeal in Ordinary as a life peer with the title Baron Keith of Kinkel, of Strathtummel in the District of Perth and Kinross, following in the footsteps of his father, Lord Keith of Avonholm. One year before he had been invested in the Privy Council. In 1996, he retired as Lord of Appeal and in 1997, he was awarded the Knight Grand Cross of the Order of the British Empire. It was humorously said within legal circles that wherever there was a negligence case, Lord Keith would always say "no" to damages.

In 1955, he married Alison Brown; they had four sons and a daughter, Deborah. The family lived at Loch Tummel, near Pitlochry, Perthshire.

Keith died in 2002.
