= Manuel Kissen, Lord Kissen =

Scottish lawyer

Manuel Abraham Kissen, Lord Kissen LLD (1912–1981) was a 20th-century Scottish lawyer who served as a senator of the College of Justice. He was Scotland's first Jewish senator of the College of Justice.

The Lord Kissen Memorial Prize was established in 1987 at Glasgow University in his name, awarded to the best student in forensic medicine.

== Life ==
He was born Manuel Abraham Kissenisky on 3 May 1912 in Vilnius in Lithuania. His family left the area and moved to Scotland while he was young and they settled in Glasgow.

He studied law at Glasgow University graduating MA in 1931.

In the Second World War he served in the RAF. He was admitted to the Scottish bar as an advocate in 1947. He mainly practiced in Glasgow and rose to be Queen's Counsel (QC).

He was Chairman of the Law Reform Committee for Scotland. In December 1963 he was elected a senator of the College of Justice under the title of Lord Kissen, taking the place of Lord Sorn.

In 1968 Glasgow University awarded him an honorary doctorate (LLD).

He died on 28 May 1981.

== Legal cases ==
He worked on the Local Government (Scotland) Act 1947 (10 & 11 Geo. 6. c. 43).

- Walsh v. Lord Advocate (Jehovah's Witness case)
- "The Bookie v. The Bank" (a case involving a wrong bank receipt crediting £90,000 instead of £9,000)

== Family ==
He had a brother who was a physician in the Springburn district of Glasgow.
