= George Coventry (minister) =

Scottish minister and amateur scientist (1791–1872)

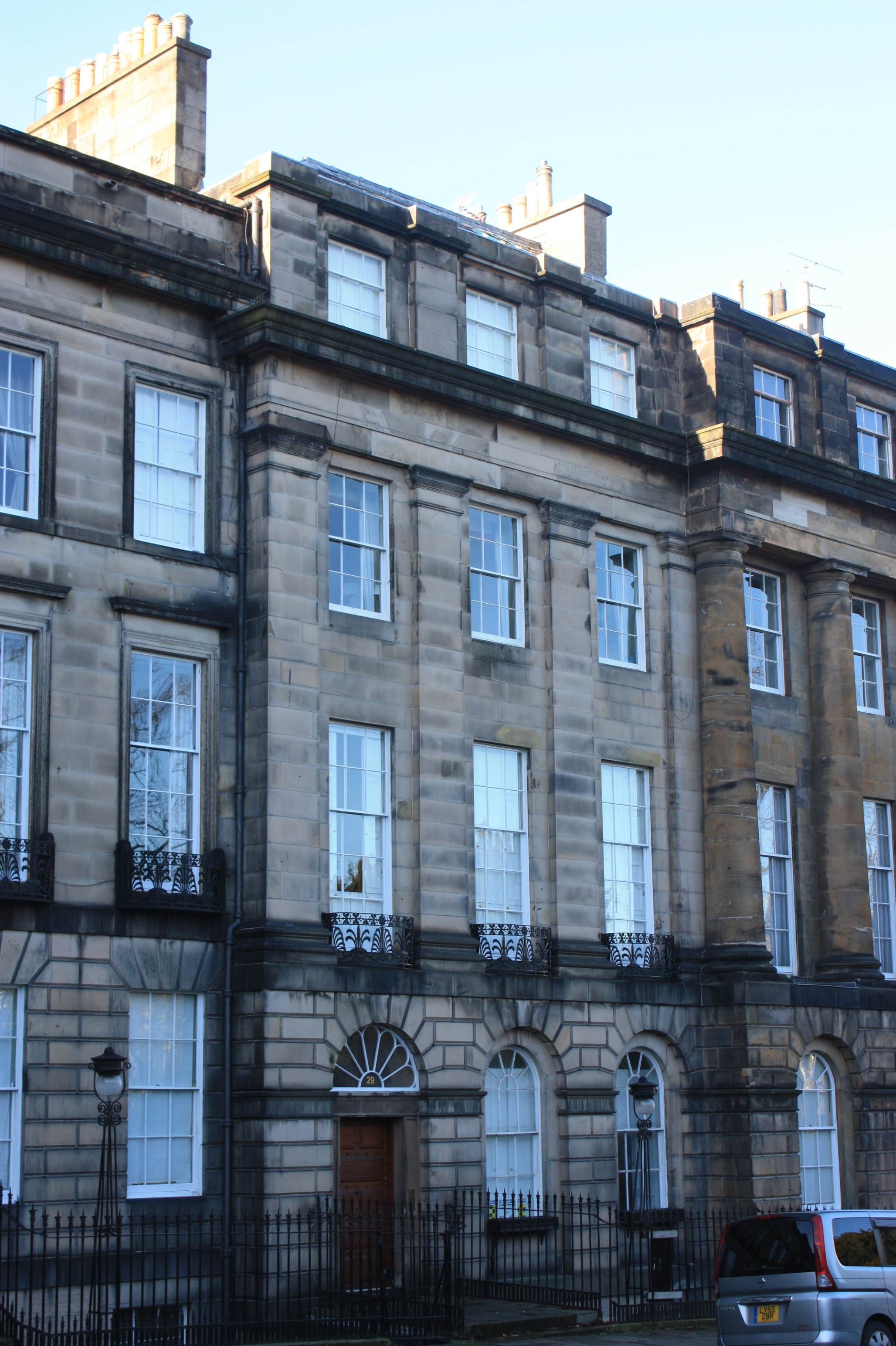
29 Moray Place

George Coventry FRSE (1791–1872) was a Scottish minister of the Episcopal Church of Scotland and amateur scientist.

== Life ==
He was born on 5 April 1791 the eldest son of Prof Andrew Coventry and his wife. They lived at 29 Moray Place, a huge Georgian townhouse on the Moray Estate. His mother Eliza Hastie died when he was six. His father remarried two years later to Martha Cunningham.

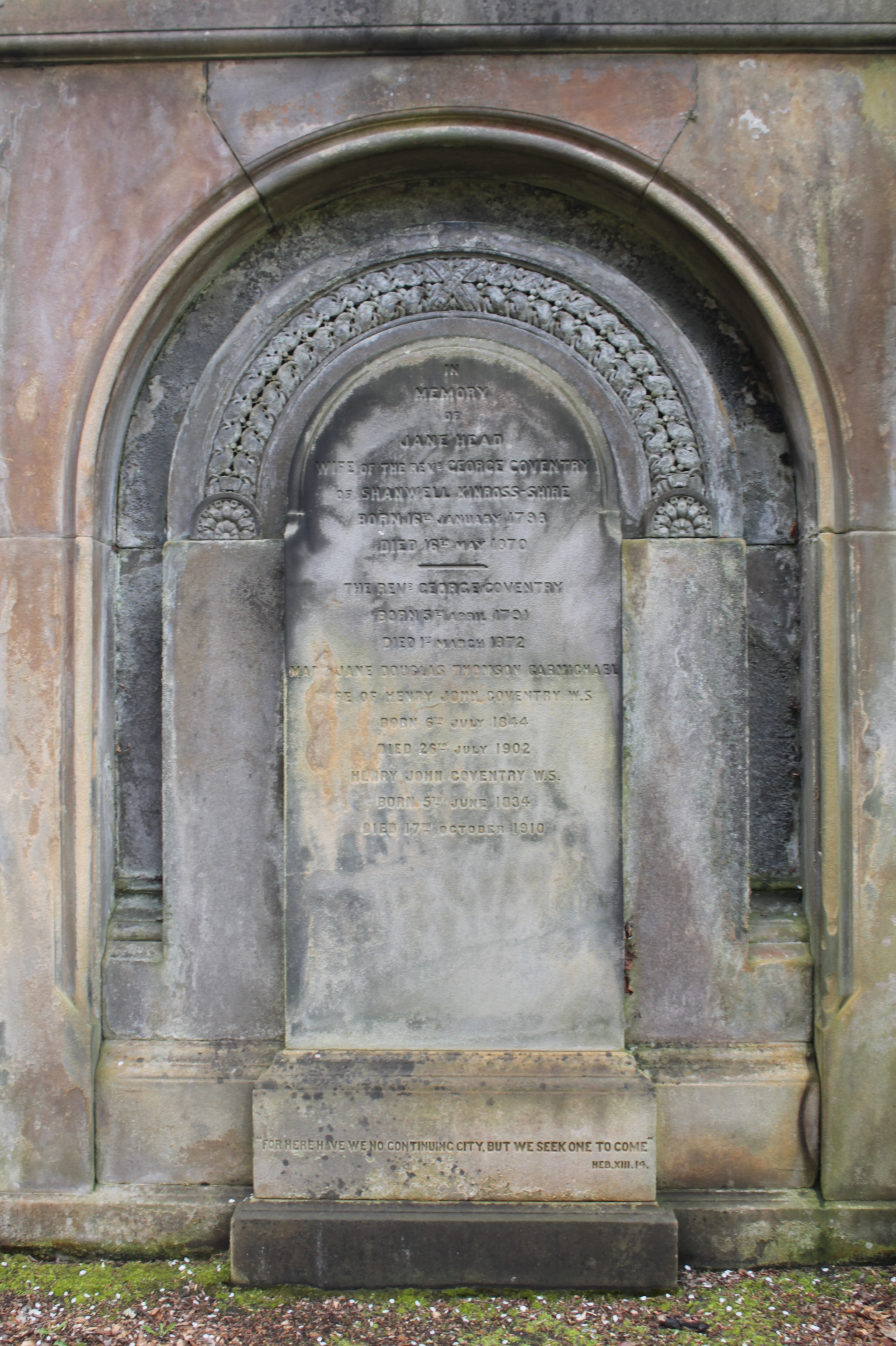
The grave of Rev George Coventry FRSE, Dean Cemetery

In 1826 he was elected a Fellow of the Royal Society of Edinburgh. His proposer was Dr George Bell, son of Benjamin Bell.

In 1830 he was living at 11 Windsor Street in Edinburgh. In that year his father died and he inherited the estate of Shanwell in Kinross-shire and other properties. He bought 49 Moray Place, a huge house close to his birthplace.

He lived his later life at 33 Melville Street, a very large townhouse in Edinburgh's affluent West End.

He died on 1 March 1872 and is buried in Dean Cemetery midway along the western wall in the section known as "lords Row".

== Family ==
He was married to Jane Head (1798-1870).

Their daughter Elizabeth married Major Alexander Pringle Scott-Moncrieff son of Robert Scott Moncrieff of Tullibole. They were parents to George Kenneth Scott-Moncrieff.

== Artistic recognition ==
He was portrayed by John Moffat.
