= James Buchanan (1785–1857) =

Scottish businessman and philanthropist

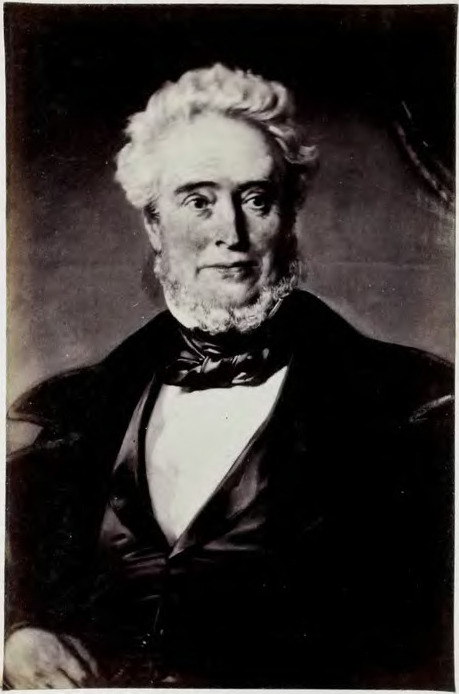
- portrait by Eugene Deveria
- Born: 27 June 1785
- Died: 21 December 1857 (aged 72)

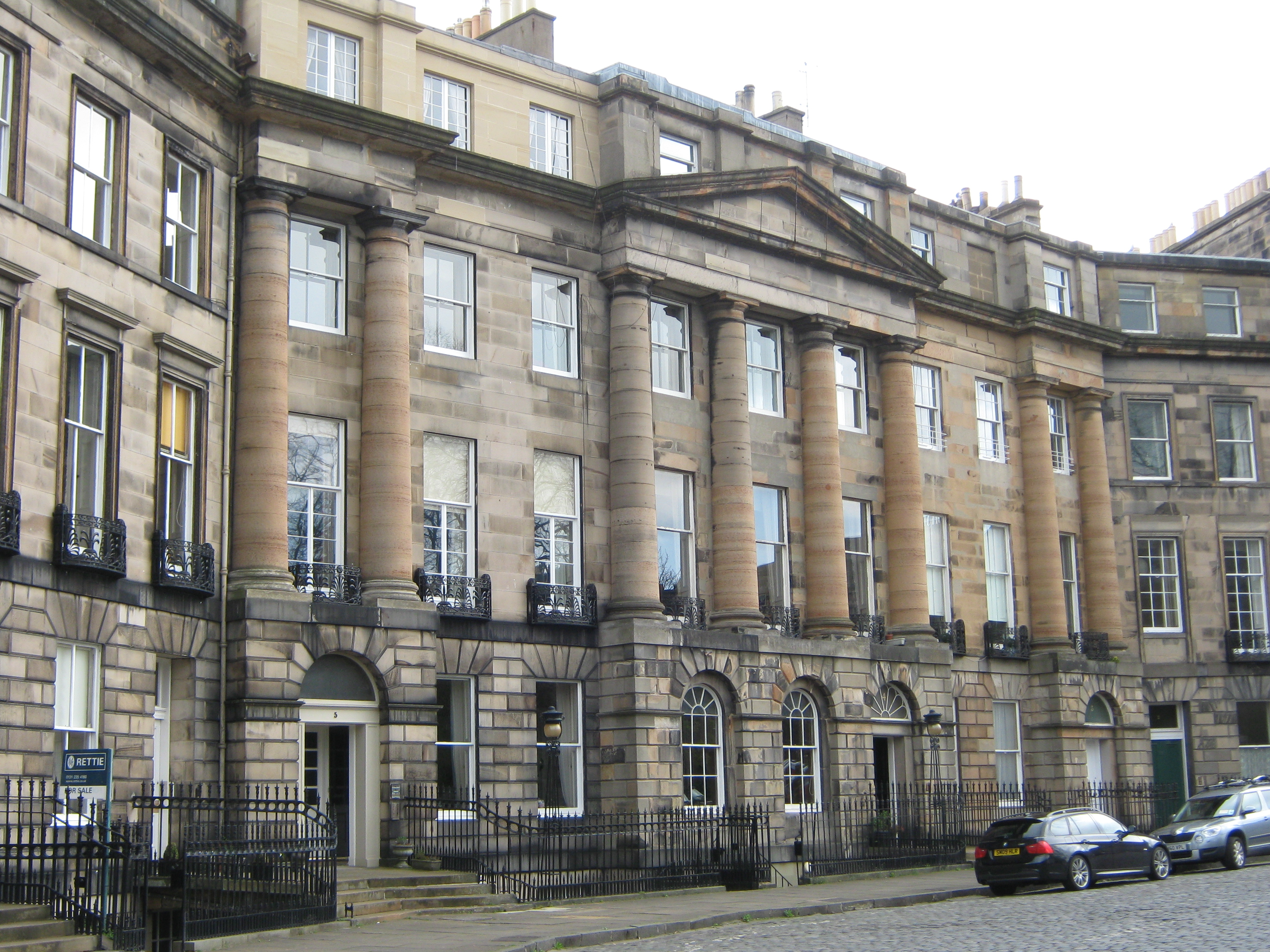
Moray Place in Edinburgh

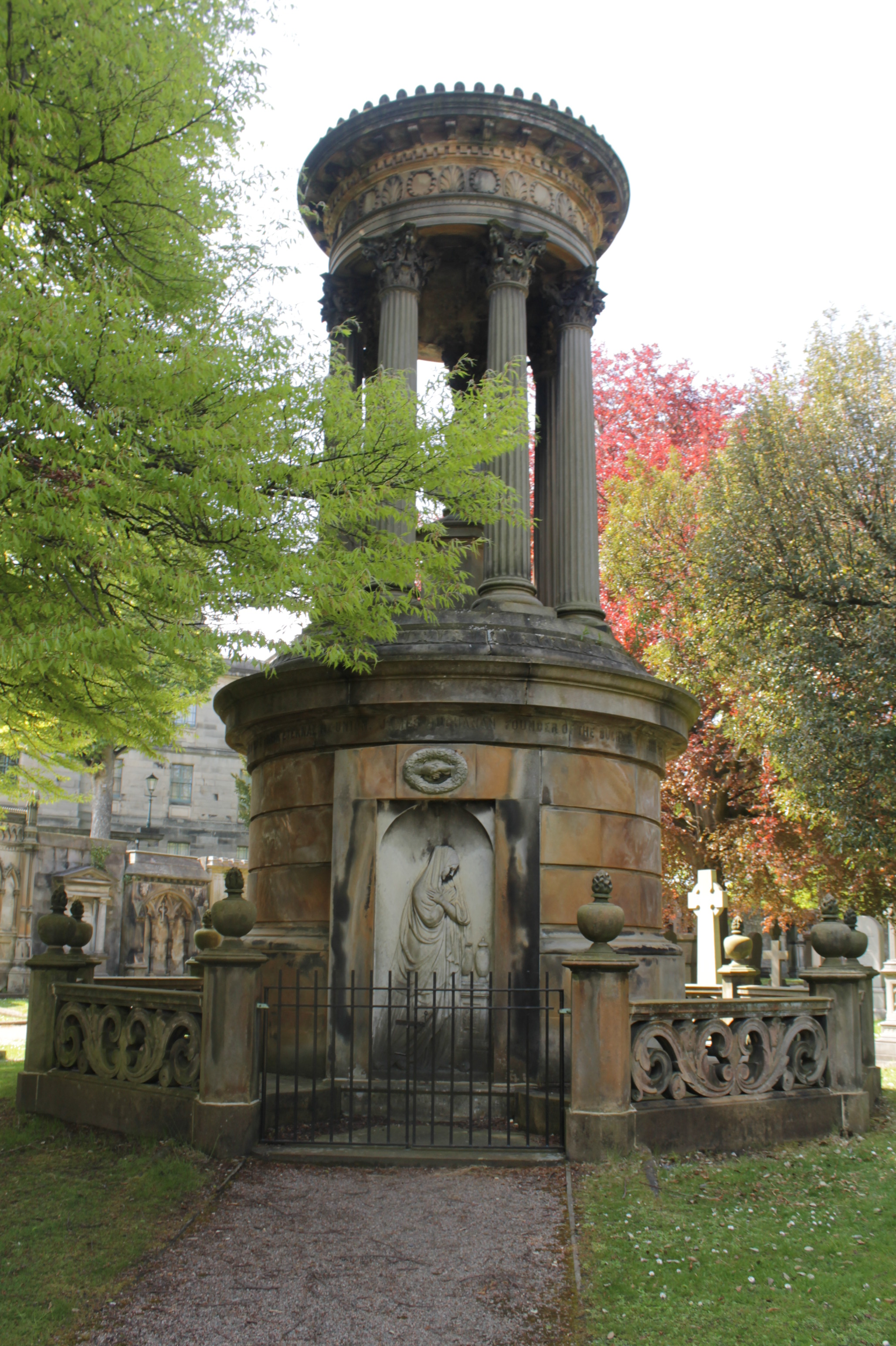
The monument to James Buchanan, Dean Cemetery

James Buchanan (1785–1857) was a Scottish businessman and philanthropist who established the Buchanan Institute in Glasgow. He was a partner in Dennistoun, Buchanan & Co. of 36 Candleriggs. His endowment creation of the Buchanan Ewing Bequest still funds the education of Scottish youth.

== Life ==
James was born in the Stockwell district of Glasgow in 1785. He was the son of Alexander Buchanan, a blacksmith and farrier, and his wife Jean Robertson. Aged 14, he went to work in a warehouse dealing in produce from the West Indies. They had great confidence in him and around 1801 they sent him to Grenada where he oversaw a plantation. Around 1805 he moved to Jamaica as a managing director of the company. Around 1810 he moved to Rio de Janeiro. He was very wealthy, enabling him to retire in 1816 aged only 31.

From 1816 onwards he was living in Buenos Aires, investing his fortune in stocks and shares with an emphasis on railways and canals both in Britain and South America. This further increased his wealth.

He returned to live in Glasgow in 1816. From 1835 he had a house on the Moray Estate in Edinburgh's fashionable West End: first at 8 Darnaway Street and from 1850 at 49 Moray Place, a huge Georgian townhouse.

He died on 21 December 1857 leaving a total of £124,000 (the equivalent of £14.5 million in 2021).

== Family ==
On 16 July 1817 he married Jane Jack of the Gorbals. They had no children.

Jane continued to live at 49 Moray Place and continued her husband's pattern of philanthropy. She took an interest in providing public drinking troughs for horses across Britain and in 1873 founded a Christian school for 20 girls in Swatow in China (now called Shantou). In 1880 she gave £1000 to Edinburgh University to give scholarships in midwifery and gynaecology.

Jane died on 11 June 1883 aged 85 and was buried with James in Dean Cemetery.

== Legacy ==
Buchanan's will left £30,000 towards the purchase of a property to be run as an industrial school for boys. The property purchased by the trustees was the former mansion house of Dugald McPhail on the edge of Glasgow Green, designed by Charles Wilson. The school closed in 1924.

Not until 1908 was his main bequest of around £20,000 to the Merchant House of Glasgow resolved, being combined with the bequest of £31,000 from James Ewing of Strathleven, to create the Buchanan Ewing Bequest which was so large as to require an Act of Parliament to regularise its distribution: the Merchants House of Glasgow (Buchanan and Ewing Bequests) Order Confirmation Act 1909. This resource funded education and apprenticeships in Scotland (mainly Glasgow) on request. This fund is still ongoing.

The trust fund paid £125 for the repair of the Buchanan grave in 1913.

In 1936, a memorial stained glass window in Glasgow Cathedral to the memory of Mr and Mrs Buchanan was replaced by a window to the Mowatt family.

== Artistic recognition ==
He was portraited by Eugene Deveria.
