= David Low (agriculturalist) =

Scottish agriculturalist

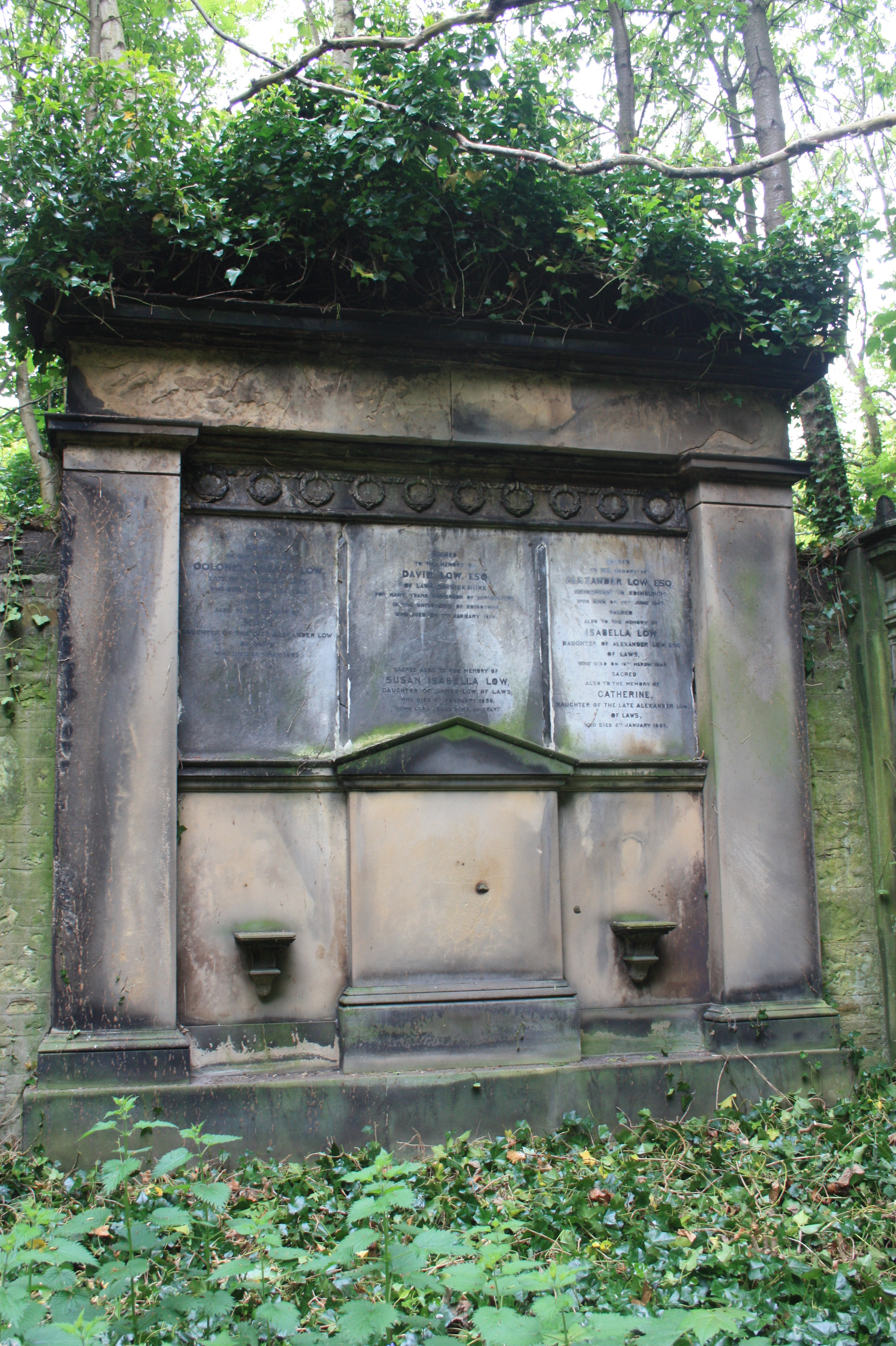
The grave of David Low, Warriston Cemetery

David Low FRSE (23 November 1786 – 26 January 1859) was a Scottish agriculturalist.

== Life ==
Low, eldest son of Alexander Low, land-agent, of Laws, Berwickshire, was born in Berwickshire in 1786, and educated at Perth Academy and the University of Edinburgh. He assisted his father on his farms, and soon showed aptitude as a land-agent and valuer.

In 1817 he published Observations on the Present State of Landed Property, and on the Prospects of the Landholder and the Farmer, in which was discussed the agricultural embarrassment caused by the sudden fall of prices on the cessation of the war. In 1825 he settled in Edinburgh, and in the following year at his suggestion the Quarterly Journal of Agriculture was established, which he edited from 1828 to 1832.

On the death of Professor Andrew Coventry in 1831 Low was appointed professor of agriculture in the University of Edinburgh (1831–54). His first step was to urge on the government the necessity of forming an agricultural museum. The Chancellor of the Exchequer consented in 1833 to allow £300 a year for that purpose. Low contributed collections of his own, and employed William Shiels, R.S.A., to travel, taking portraits of the best specimens of different breeds of animals. Altogether £3,000 was expended on the museum, of which £1,500 came from the government, £300 from the Reid fund, and the rest from the professor's private resources. The museum led to increased attendance in the class of agriculture, which numbered from 70 to 90 students.

In the 1830s he is recorded as having two addresses, both prestigious. His town address is given as 33 Howe Street in the New Town, and his country address is given as Craigleith House, then on the western outskirts of the city.

Low was also interested in chemistry, and had a private laboratory. In 1842 he authored The Breeds of the Domestic Animals of the British Islands, with coloured plates, which was translated into French for the French government.

Low resigned his chair in 1854, and was replaced by Prof John Wilson.

He died at his home, Mayfield House in Trinity, Edinburgh, on 7 January 1859, and was interred nearby at Warriston Cemetery. The large grave site lies on the southern edge of the original cemetery, backing onto the former railway, now a cycle path. The grave was re-exposed by the Friends of Warriston Cemetery in 2017.

== Works ==
Besides the works already mentioned, Low was the author of:

- Elements of Practical Agriculture, 1834 (4th edn. 1843; translated into French and German)
- The Breeds of the Domestic Animals of the British Islands, London, 1842
- On the Domesticated Animals of the British Islands: Comprehending the Natural and Economical History of Species and Varieties; the Description of the Properties of External Form; and Observations on the Principles and Practice of Breeding, 1845
- On Landed Property and the Economy of Estates, 1844
- An Inquiry into the Nature of the Simple Bodies of Chemistry, 1844 (3rd edn. 1856)
- Appeal to the Common Sense of the Country regarding the Condition of the Industrious Classes, 1850
