= Philip Twining =

Decorated Canadian soldier

Major-General Sir Philip Twining KCMG CB MVO
- Born: Philip Geoffrey Twining; 7 September 1862; Halifax, Nova Scotia, British North America
- Died: 15 January 1920 (aged 57); Kensington, London, UK
- Military career
- Allegiance: United Kingdom
- Branch: British Army
- Rank: Major-General
- Unit: Royal Engineers
- Awards: KCMG, CB, MVO

Major-General Sir Philip Geoffrey Twining, KCMG, CB, MVO (7 September 1862 – 15 January 1920) was a Canadian soldier who served with the British Army in England, Canada, East Africa, India, and China.

== Education ==
Twining was born in 1862. He enrolled at the Royal Military College of Canada in Kingston, Ontario from 1880 to 1883, student # 88.

== Military service ==
He was commissioned as an officer, with the rank of lieutenant, with the Royal Engineers in January 1886, and served in India from 1887 to 1891. He was sent to Mombasa for a year to survey a railway route to Lake Victoria Nyanza. As a Lieutenant, he was an instructor and later as a Captain a professor in military engineering at the Royal Military College of Canada from 1895 to 1899. He performed engineering, railway and survey work in India during the years from 1899 to 1914, but was in January 1901 appointed a Special service officer to serve on the British Military Staff in China during the Boxer Rebellion. He was mentioned in despatches by Major-General O'Moore Creagh, commander of the British force in China, for his work with the Chinese railways, and was commended ″for his skill in originally organizing the Locomotive Department, patching up engines, &c, with scant materials, and in record time″.

During the First World War, he was Adjutant of the British First Army. He served as Director of Fortification and Works at the War Office 1918–20. He was promoted to substantive major general in January 1917.

== Awards and recognition ==
He was knighted as a Knight Commander of the Order of St Michael and St George (KCMG), was a Companion of the Order of the Bath (CB) 1918 and Member of the Royal Victorian Order (MVO). As a Lieutenant-Colonel in 1911, he was awarded 1st (K.G.O.) Sappers and Miners.

Twining Island, St. Joseph Channel, Algoma District, Ontario was named in honour of 88 Major General Sir Philip Geoffrey Twining KCMG, COB, MVO (RMC 1880–1883) Royal Engineers

== Family ==
Twining married Louise Mary (d. 1956), daughter of George and Mary Daly of Toronto. He is buried in Wolvercote Cemetery, Oxford, UK.

Military offices
Preceded by George Kenneth Scott-Moncrieff	Director of Fortifications and Works; 1918–1920	Succeeded by Sir William Andrew Liddell
