= Thomas Graham Robertson, Lord Robertson =

Scottish advocate

Thomas Graham Robertson, Lord Robertson FRSE (1881–1944) was a 20th-century Scottish advocate, who became a Senator of the College of Justice.

== Life ==
He was born on 23 November 1881, the son of James Hinton Robertson a notary public. The family lived at South Edgehill House in Langside in southern Glasgow. He was educated at Glasgow Academy. He then studied law at Glasgow University graduating MA LLB. He passed the Scottish bar as an advocate in 1906. At this stage, he was living in a flat at 8 Dundas Street in Edinburgh's Second New Town.

In the First World War, he worked in the War Trade Department and then moved to the Admiralty at the rank of Lt. Commander in the RNVR.

In 1937, he was elected a Fellow of the Royal Society of Edinburgh. His proposers were John Alexander Inglis, Thomas Cooper, 1st Baron Cooper of Culross, Sir John Sutherland, and Sir John Fraser.

He died in Edinburgh on 10 March 1944.

== Family ==
In 1911, he married Mary Snowdon Robertson.
