= Edinburgh and St Andrews Universities by-election =

Edinburgh and St Andrews Universities by-election may refer to:

- 1873 Edinburgh and St Andrews Universities by-election
- 1888 Edinburgh and St Andrews Universities by-election
- 1890 Edinburgh and St Andrews Universities by-election
- 1896 Edinburgh and St Andrews Universities by-election
- 1900 Edinburgh and St Andrews Universities by-election
- 1916 Edinburgh and St Andrews Universities by-election
- 1917 Edinburgh and St Andrews Universities by-election

== See also ==
- Edinburgh and St Andrews Universities (UK Parliament constituency)
