= 1900 Edinburgh and St Andrews Universities by-election =

UK parliamentary by-election

- 3 May 1900
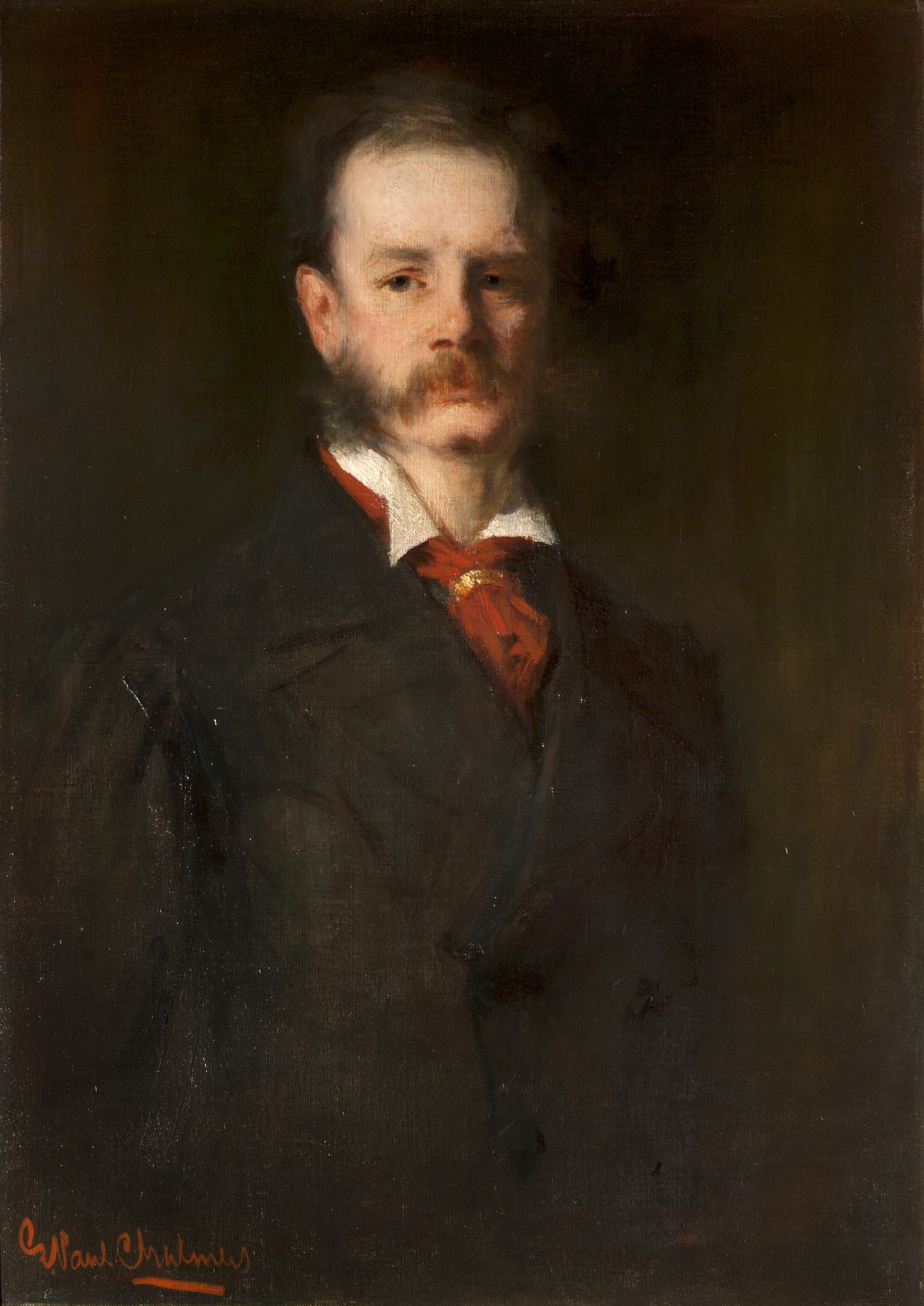
Candidate	Sir John Batty Tuke
Party	Conservative
MP before election
Priestley
Conservative
Subsequent MP
Tuke
Conservative

The 1900 Edinburgh and St Andrews Universities by-election was a parliamentary by-election held in Scotland on 3 May 1900 for the UK House of Commons constituency of Edinburgh and St Andrews Universities.

As a university constituency, the constituency had no geographical basis. Instead, its electorate consisted of the graduates of Edinburgh University and St Andrews University.

== Vacancy ==
The by-election was held to fill the vacancy caused by the death on 11 April 1900 of 70-year-old Conservative Party Member of Parliament (MP) Sir William Overend Priestley. An eminent obstetrician, Priestley had held the seat since a by-election in May 1896.

== Candidates ==
The Conservative Party selected as its candidate the 65-year-old Sir John Batty Tuke. He was a Yorkshire-born, Edinburgh-educated, pioneering psychiatrist based at the Royal Edinburgh Hospital, who had been knighted in 1898.

Nomination day was set as Thursday 3 May, but the seat had last been contested at the 1885 general election. The Conservatives did not expect a contest in the by-election, and speculation that the novelist J. M. Barrie would stand as a Liberal Party candidate ended on 30 April when Barrie sent a telegram declining nomination.

== Result ==
The nomination process was held in the Senate Hall of the University of Edinburgh on 3 May 1900, where the Principal Sir William Muir presided over a gathering of only about 20 people. Tuke was nominated by Professor Thomas Annandale of Edinburgh, and seconded by Professor Scott Lang of the University of St Andrews.

No other candidate was nominated, so Tuke was declared elected.

== Aftermath ==
Tuke was re-elected unopposed at the general election in September/October 1900. At the 1906 general election, he was re-elected in a two-way contest with John Strachey (journalist), a Free Trader. He stood down at the January 1910 general election.

== See also ==
- List of United Kingdom by-elections
- Edinburgh and St Andrews Universities constituency
- 1873 Edinburgh and St Andrews Universities by-election
- 1888 Edinburgh and St Andrews Universities by-election
- 1890 Edinburgh and St Andrews Universities by-election
- 1896 Edinburgh and St Andrews Universities by-election
- 1916 Edinburgh and St Andrews Universities by-election
- 1917 Edinburgh and St Andrews Universities by-election
