= Procurator to the General Assembly of the Church of Scotland =

The Procurator to the General Assembly of the Church of Scotland is the principal legal advisor to the General Assembly of the Church of Scotland. The holder of the office is invariably a King's Counsel in Scotland. Day-to-day advice is given by the Church's own Law Department, headed by the Solicitor to the Church; the Procurator can be called on for specialist advice.

The current procurator is Jonathan Brodie KC. Former procurators include Lord Davidson, Lord Penrose, Sheriff Principal RA Dunlop QC and Lord Hodge.

== List of Procurators ==
Incomplete

- 1638: Archibald Johnston of Warriston (executed 22 July 1663)
- 1706–1731: John Dundas
- 1731–1745: William Grant
- 1746–1778: David Dalrymple
- 1778–1806: William Robertson
- 1806–1831: Sir John Connell
- 1831–1856: Robert Bell
- 1856–1869: Alexander Shank Cook
- 1869–1880: Robert Lee
- 1880–1886: William Mackintosh
- 1886–1891: Sir Charles Pearson
- 1891–1906: Sir John Cheyne
- 1907–1918: Sir Christopher Nicolson Johnston
- 1918–1922: William Watson
- 1929–1936: Sir William Chree KC LLD
- 1936–1937: Sir Archibald Campbell Black KC
- 1938–1948: James Frederick Strachan KC
- 1949–1957: Sir James Randal Philip OBE KC
- 1958–1968: Thomas Pringle McDonald QC
- 1969–1972: William Robertson Grieve QC
- 1972–????: Charles Kemp Davidson QC
- 2000–2005: Patrick Hodge QC
- 2005–2023: Laura Dunlop KC
- 2023–present: Jonathan Brodie KC
