= Colin Dunlop =

Colin Dunlop may refer to:

- Colin Dunlop (bishop) (1897–1968), Anglican bishop
- Colin Dunlop (politician) (1775–1837), Scottish politician and industrialist
- Colin Dunlop (sailor) (born 1962), Fijian sailor
- Colin Dunlop of Carmyle (1706–1777), Scottish tobacco lord and banker
