= Balvarran =

Old laird's house and estate in Strathardle, Perth and Kinros

Coordinates: 56°44′26″N 3°30′58″W

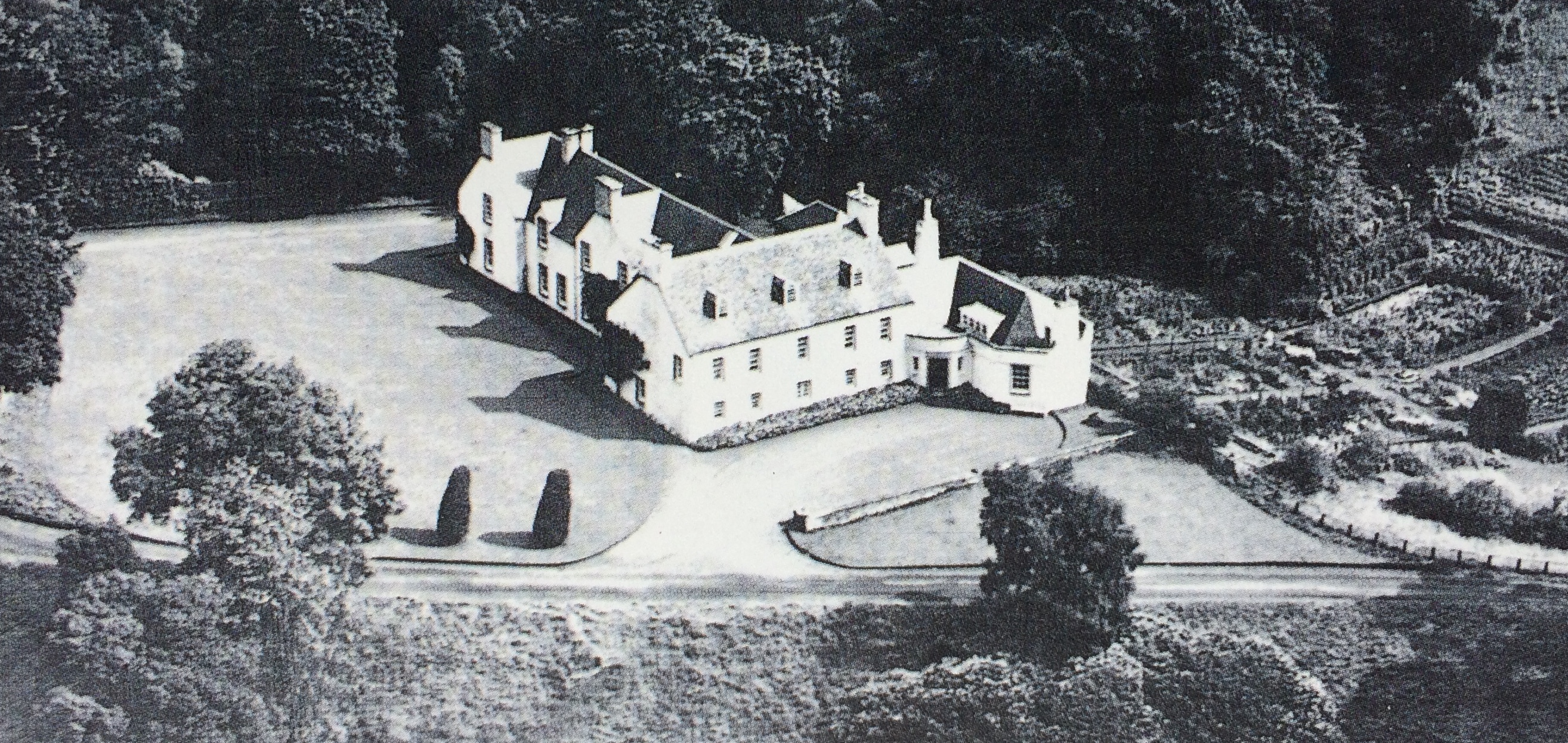
Balvarran House in around 1960

Balvarran is an old laird's house and estate in Strathardle, Perth and Kinross. It is situated to the east of the River Ardle, a mile east of Enochdhu. In 1554 the Earl of Atholl granted a charter of the lands of Invercrosky and Whitefield to Baron Ruadh, who built a house on the land which he named Balvarran, meaning Township of the Baron. John Reid (British Army officer) founder of the chair of music at University of Edinburgh and composer of the march known as The Garb of Old Gaul was born at Balvarran on 13 February 1721.

The existing house, which is category B listed, dates back to the 17th century and was completed in 1641. Just three years later, in 1644, it was burnt to the ground by the James Graham, 1st Marquess of Montrose. In more recent times cannonballs fired by Montrose's men have been found in the immediate proximity of the house. It was soon rebuilt and later underwent further additions, including a porch, entrance hall, billiards room, kennels and stables designed by Sir Robert Lorimer in 1895. The entrance hall and billiard room include fine plasterwork ceilings.

There are three marriage lintels at the property although it is believed all of the dates relate to completion of building works as opposed to the date of marital union. The earliest of these lintels bears the date 1641.

Though the exact circumstances are unclear the Duke of Atholl granted the property to James Stormonth of Lednathie in 1781. Moir Tod Stormonth Darling, Lord Stormonth Darling lived at Balvarran between 1894 and 1912. Balvarran remains the home of the Stormonth Darling family.

== Myth, legend and folklore ==
=== The Balvarran Cupped Stone ===
The Balvarran Cupped Stone is located 150 metres (490 ft) north-north-east of the house. This archaeological feature is a mass of micaceous schist featuring four large cups in the surface. It is suggested the cups may have been "cressets to light monks to their devotions" or that it might have been used as a christening stone by the Barons Ruadh, but there is no definite nor agreed original use for the stone.

==== Cam Ruadh ====
Cattle thieves were a persistent problem in the area during the 17th century. To remedy the situation Alexander Ruadh, the 6th Baron Ruadh, engaged the services of his cousin, Cam Ruadh - a respected archer despite having just one eye. Together they schemed to make a white cow lame so that when the cattle were driven away at night the white cow would be visible at the back of the herd. Whenever one of the thieves hit the white cow with a stick to drive it on, Cam Ruadh shot an arrow just a yard behind it and in so doing killed the drover. Once several of the raiders had been killed or injured the rest of them fled leaving the cattle behind. Cam Ruadh had predicted their escape route and hid towards the bottom of the Altchroskie burn, a little above Altchroskie House to the west of Balvarran. Here he killed several more raiders making their escape. It is said that the burn was so reddened with blood that even the stones were stained. There have been many reported sightings of the ghosts of these caterans along the burn.

==== The Bhantighearna Mharranach ====
The 7th baron's wife, Magdalene, was well known locally as a ‘dreamer of dreams’ and prophetess. Many tales of the ‘Bhantighearna Mharranach’, (the derivation from gaelic is the Mar Lady) as she was known, remained in local folklore for generations. One such vision occurred on 26 July 1689, when she dreamed she was standing in front of the house at Balvarran and saw a dragon spitting balls of fire flying towards her from the west. However the dragon could do her no harm as it was tethered to a chain at its foot. Though this vision did not transpire literally it's thought to signify a feared army of men led by John Graham, Viscount Dundee, who had threatened to execute the likes of Baron Ruadh unless he offered up arms for the Jacobite cause. The following day Viscount Dundee was killed at the Battle of Killiecrankie.
