= William Mackintosh, Lord Kyllachy =

Scottish advocate (1842–1918)

William Mackintosh, Lord Kyllachy LLD (9 April 1842 – 9 December 1918) was a Scottish advocate who later became a Senator of the College of Justice. His country estate was Kyllachy House near Tomatin.

== Life ==
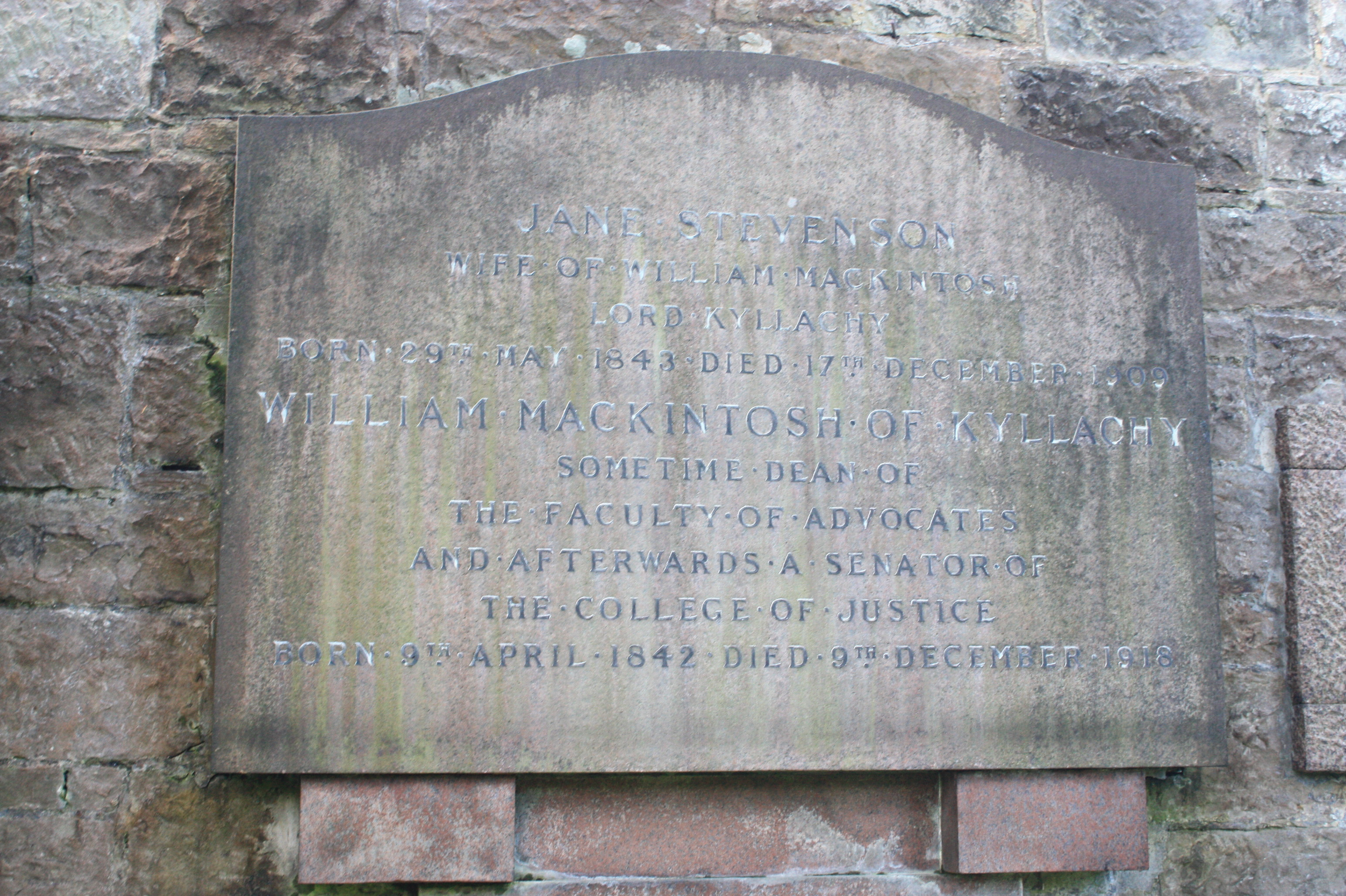
The grave of William Mackintosh, Lord Kyllachy, Dean Cemetery

He was born on 9 April 1842, the son of Mary Walker and her husband William Mackintosh of Inches, a wine merchant and one time Provost in nearby Inverness. He was educated at Edinburgh Academy then studied law at the University of Edinburgh, graduating with an MA in 1862.

He qualified as an advocate in 1865. In 1880 he became Procurator to the General Assembly of the Church of Scotland. In 1881 he became Sheriff of Ross, Cromarty and Sutherland. He was made Dean of Faculty and Queen’s Counsel in 1886. In 1886 he rebuilt his family home in Invernessshire overlooking the River Findhorn, as Kyllachy House, in a Victorian “hunting lodge” style.

He was raised to the bench and given the title “Lord Kellachy” (his country estate) in 1889.

In 1891 he was elected a Fellow of the Royal Society of Edinburgh. His proposers were Sir John Murray, Peter Guthrie Tait, John McLaren, Lord McLaren and Alexander Smith Kinnear, Lord Kinnear. He resigned the following year.

He retired in 1907. In Edinburgh he lived at 6 Randolph Crescent, but following his wife’s death he spent more time in Glasgow. His health waned with the death of his wife and further with the death of his son.

He died in Glasgow on 9 December 1918. He is buried with his wife in Dean Cemetery in western Edinburgh. The grave lies on the concealed southern terrace, towards the eastern end.

He was a keen golfer and a member of the Honourable Company of Edinburgh Golfers.

== Family ==
In 1869 he married Jane Stevenson (1843–1909) daughter of David Stevenson and cousin to Robert Louis Stevenson. Their children included Alistair Hugh Mackintosh, who was killed in 1914 during the First Battle of the Aisne; his body was never recovered.
