= Arthur Connell (Lord Provost) =

Scottish sugar merchant and importer

- Born: 1717; East Kilbride, Scotland, Great Britain
- Died: 1775 (aged 57–58)
- Children: John
- Military career
- Allegiance: Great Britain
- Service years: 1746
- Conflicts: Jacobite rising of 1745 Battle of Falkirk Muir

Arthur Connell (1717 – 1775) was an 18th-century Scottish sugar merchant and importer, who served as Lord Provost of Glasgow from 1772 to 1774. He was partner in the firm of Somervell Connell and Company.

== Life ==
He was born in 1717 at the manse in East Kilbride, the son of Rev Matthew Connell.

In 1746, he commanded a company of the Glasgow Volunteers at the Battle of Falkirk Muir.

He lived at Enoch Bank mansion house at the junction of West George Street and Renfield Street, near Glasgow Cross. His house had large grounds including orchards. The house was rebuilt around 1802 and renamed Gilmorehill House. It was demolished in 1870 to make way for the Gilbert Scott Building at Glasgow University. The university gym stands where the house stables stood.

In 1764, he became Dean of Guild for Glasgow Town Council. Connell was a magistrate in the city and had property both in Glasgow and the West Indies.

In 1772, he succeeded Colin Dunlop of Carmyle as Lord Provost.

== Family ==
In 1747, he was married to Magdalen Wallace, daughter of Thomas Wallace of Cairnhill.

Their children included Sir John Connell, father to the chemist Arthur Connell.

== Artistic recognition ==
His portrait by Robert Harvie is held at Glasgow Museum Resource Centre. It was donated by Mrs Anne D. Houston of Johnstone Castle.
