= Charles Pearson, Lord Pearson =

Scottish politician and judge (1843–1910)

Pearson in 1895.

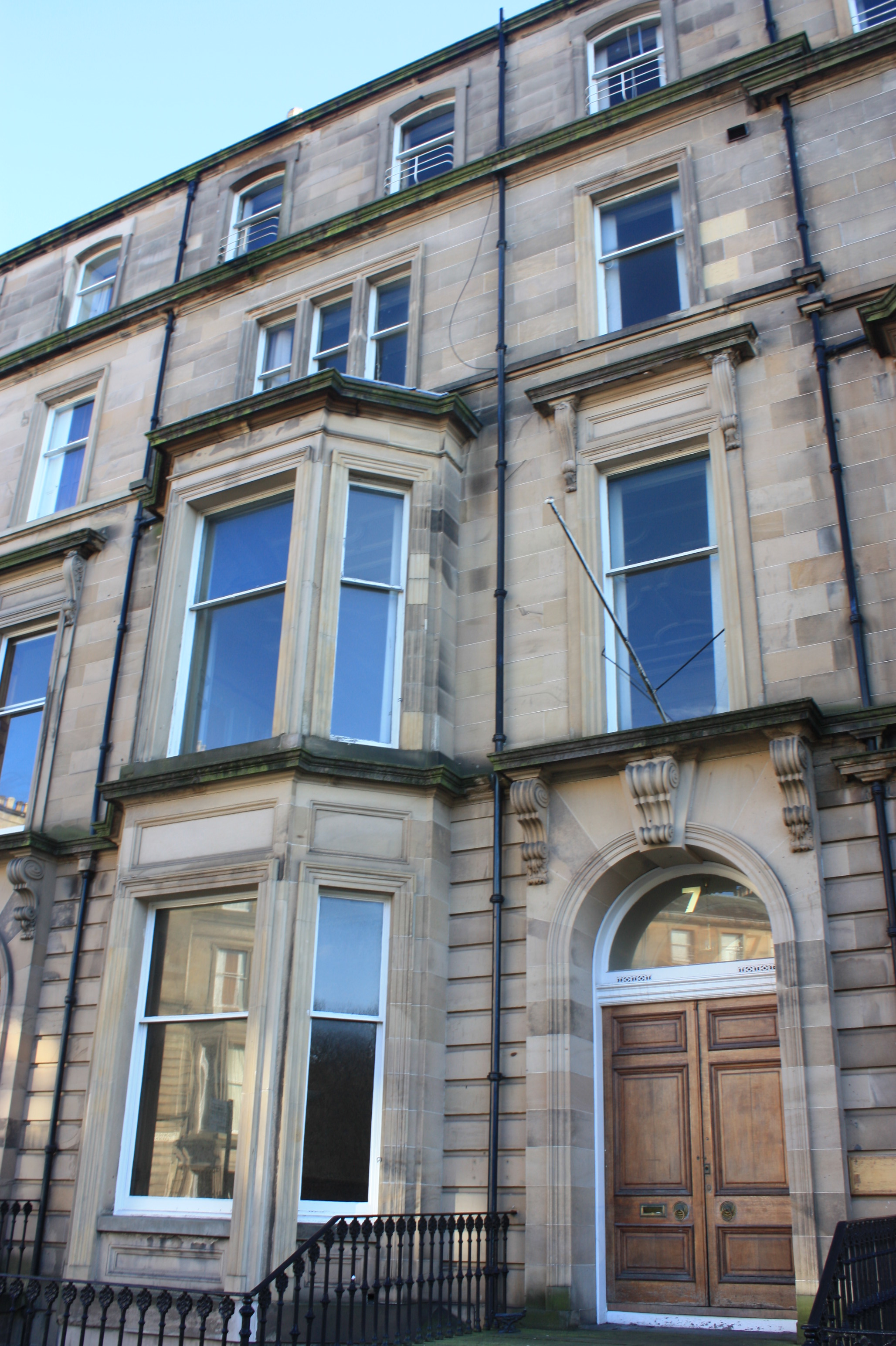
Pearson's substantial Edinburgh townhouse at 7 Drumsheugh Gardens

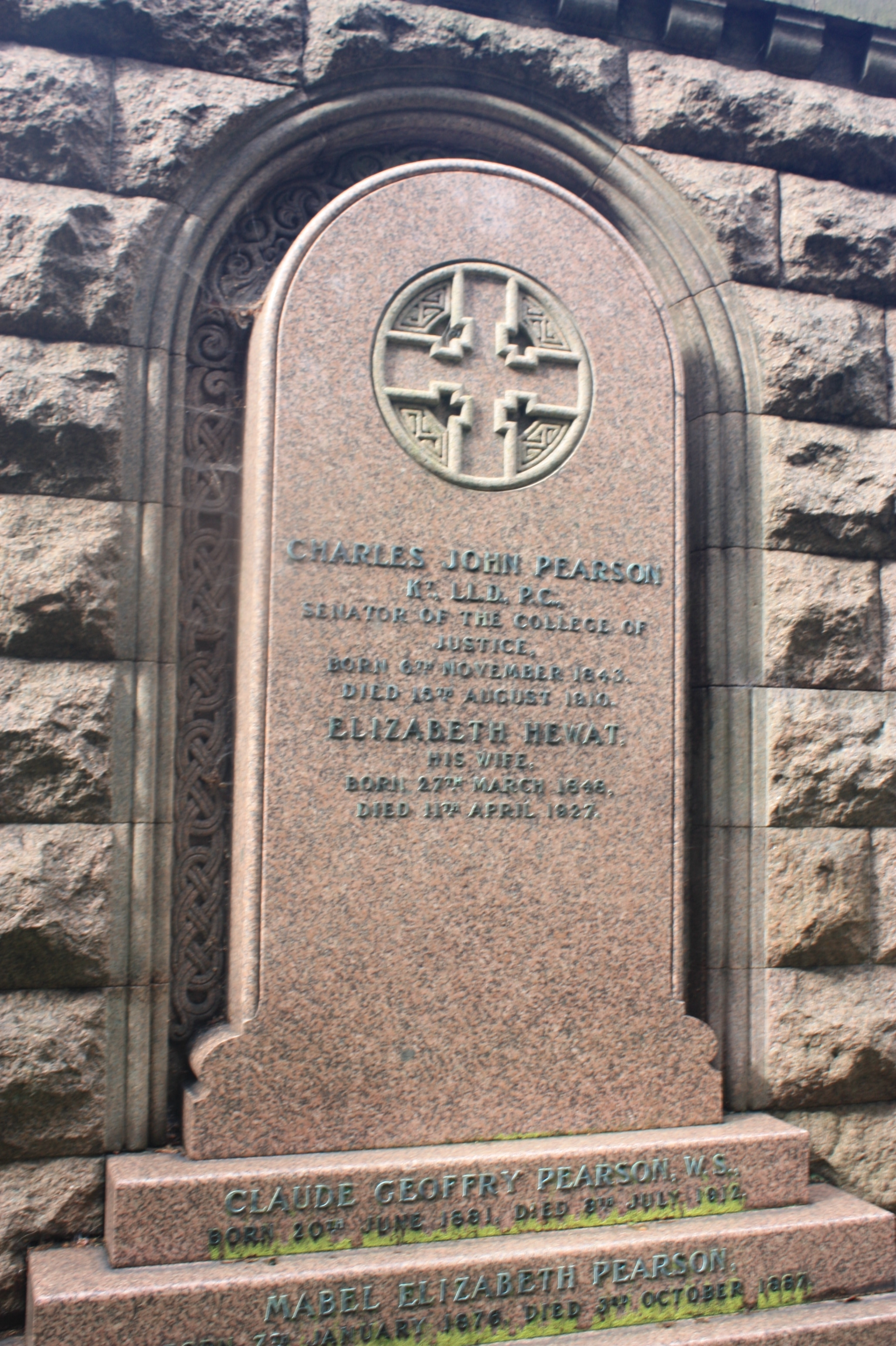
Lord Pearson's grave, Dean Cemetery

Charles John Pearson, Lord Pearson (6 November 1843 – 15 August 1910) was a Scottish politician and judge who rose to be a Senator of the College of Justice.

== Life ==
He was born in Edinburgh on 6 November 1843. He was second son of Charles Pearson, chartered accountant, of Edinburgh, by his wife Margaret, daughter of John Dalziel, solicitor, of Earlston, Berwickshire. The family lived at Murrayfield House in west Edinburgh.

After attending Edinburgh Academy, he proceeded to the University of St. Andrews, and thence to Corpus Christi College, Oxford, where he distinguished himself in classics, winning the Gaisford Greek prizes for prose (1862) and verse (1863). He graduated B.A. with a first class in the final classical school in 1865.

He afterwards attended law lectures in Edinburgh, and became a member of the Juridical Society, of which he was librarian in 1872–3, and of the Speculative Society (president 1869–71). He was called to the English bar (from the Inner Temple) on 10 June 1870, and on 19 July 1870 passed to the Scottish bar, where he rapidly obtained a large practice. Though not one of the crown counsel for Scotland, he was specially retained for the prosecution at the trial of the City of Glasgow Bank directors (January 1879), became sheriff of chancery in 1885, and Procurator and cashier for the Church of Scotland in 1886.

In 1887, he was knighted, and was appointed sheriff of Renfrew and Bute in 1888 and of Perthshire in 1889. Pearson was a conservative, though not a keen politician, and in 1890 was appointed Solicitor General for Scotland in Lord Salisbury's second administration, and was elected (unopposed) as Edinburgh and St Andrews Universities. In the same year he became Q.C.

In 1891, he succeeded James Patrick Bannerman Robertson, as lord advocate, and was sworn of the privy council. At the general election of 1892, he was again returned unopposed for Edinburgh and St. Andrews Universities. After the fall of Lord Salisbury's ministry in 1892, he ceased to be lord advocate, and was chosen dean of the Faculty of Advocates. He received the honorary degree of LL.D. from Edinburgh University in 1894, and on the return of the conservatives to power in the following year became again lord advocate, and resigned the deanship. In 1896, on the resignation of Andrew Rutherfurd-Clark, Lord Rutherfurd-Clark, he was raised to the bench, from which he retired, owing to bad health, in 1909.

In later life he lived at 7 Drumsheugh Gardens, a large Victorian townhouse in Edinburgh's West End.

He died at home in Edinburgh on 15 August 1910, and was buried in the Dean Cemetery. He is buried against the north wall of the Victorian northern extension, near the north-west corner.

== Family ==
On 23 July 1873, Pearson married Elizabeth Hewat, daughter of M. Grayhurst Hewat of St. Cuthbert's, Norwood, by whom he had three sons.

== Notes ==
Parliament of the United Kingdom
Preceded by Moir Tod Stormonth Darling	Member of Parliament for Edinburgh & St Andrews Universities; 1890–1896	Succeeded by William Overend Priestley
Legal offices
Preceded by Moir Stormonth Darling	Solicitor General for Scotland; 1890–1891	Succeeded by Andrew Murray
Preceded by James Robertson	Lord Advocate; 1891–1892	Succeeded by John Blair Balfour
Preceded by John Blair Balfour	Lord Advocate; 1895–1896	Succeeded by Andrew Murray
