= John Batty Tuke =

Scottish psychiatrist (1835–1913)

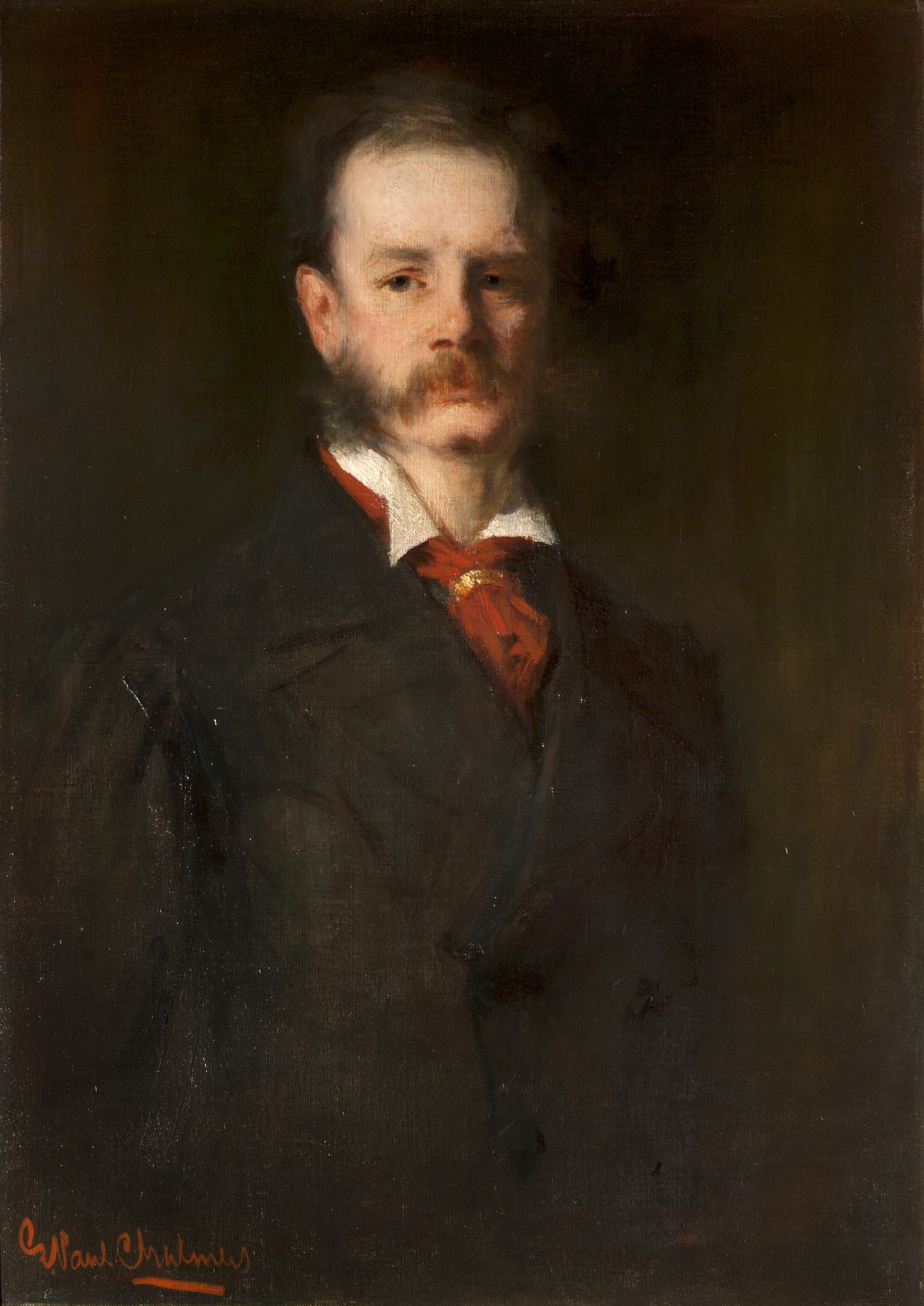
- Born: 9 January 1835; Beverley, England
- Died: 13 October 1913 (aged 78); Edinburgh, Scotland
- Education: University of Edinburgh
- Known for: puerpural insanity, MP, President of the Royal College of Physicians of Edinburgh
- Awards: Honorary D.Sc. Trinity College, Dublin, Knighthood
- Scientific career
- Fields: Neuroscience

Batty Tuke in later life

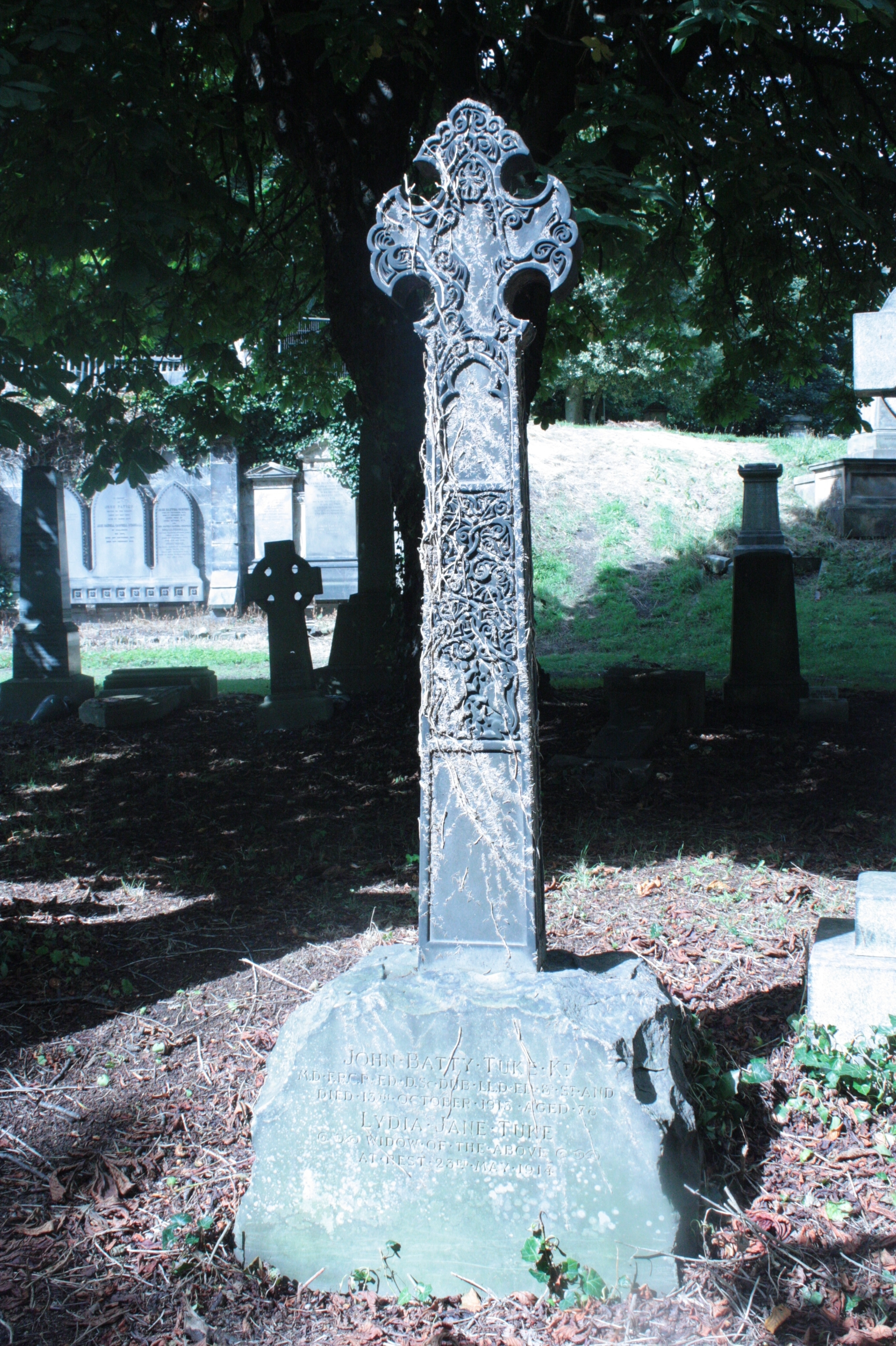
John Batty Tuke's grave, Warriston Cemetery

Sir John Batty Tuke PRCPE FRSE LLD (9 January 1835 – 13 October 1913) was one of the most influential psychiatrists in Scotland in the late nineteenth century, and a Unionist Member of Parliament (MP) from 1900 to 1910. Tuke's career in Edinburgh from 1863 to 1910 spanned a period of significant social and political changes in asylum governance and care in Scotland. Tuke's professional success in public and private practice and his powerful role in several prominent medical societies allowed him to influence his colleagues toward a more physiological understanding of mental illness and its treatment.

== Biography ==
Batty Tuke (as he is most often referenced) was born in Beverley, England on 9 January 1835, the son of John Batty Tuke. Articles about Batty Tuke link him to the famous Tuke family that founded the York Retreat.

In 1845 Tuke was sent to Edinburgh where he began attending Edinburgh Academy as a boarder. He completed his education there with honours in history and reading in 1851. Tuke then studied medicine at the Edinburgh University Medical School where he graduated in 1856 with the thesis "On idiocy" and was registered at the Royal College of Surgeons of Edinburgh. Shortly after qualifying, Tuke went to New Zealand as a medical surgeon for seven years in the New Zealand Wars.

Upon his return to Edinburgh in 1863 Tuke was appointed to the Royal Edinburgh Asylum (later renamed the Royal Edinburgh Hospital) as an assistant physician. Under the tutelage of the then superintendent David Skae Tuke quickly developed a niche in puerperal insanity and published influential articles on the subject.

In 1865 Tuke's reputation was confirmed with an appointment to the newly built Fife & Kinross District Asylum (now Stratheden Hospital) as superintendent. There he had the ability to hire and train his entire staff and set out an "open-doors" model of care for his patients which gained him further accolades from his peers. While Tuke was working in this influential position, his publications began especially to promote his ideas for the advancement of humane patient treatment. In 1871 Dr John Fraser joined the Fife Asylum as his assistant. He later married his daughter (see below).

As his career progressed Tuke also occupied positions of leadership within the Royal College of Physicians of Edinburgh and wrote an influential article on the "cottage system" of care for insane people where he criticised the traditional Scottish practices of caring for "incurable" insane people by boarding them out with often destitute members of the community in exchange for meager compensation. In 1873 Tuke returned to Edinburgh to take a joint management position with Dr Smith and Dr Lowe at the private Saughton Hall Asylum. This move marked a change from public to private care and Tuke also set up a practice in Charlotte Square as a "specialist in mental diseases". That year, he was appointed to be Morison Lecturer at the RCPE for 1874, and began teaching at the University of Edinburgh. In 1874 he was elected a member of the Harveian Society of Edinburgh. Another notable achievement during this time was his contribution to the ninth edition of the Encyclopædia Britannica. Considered to be the most 'scholarly' edition produced by this publisher Tuke wrote the entries on hysteria and insanity. Tuke also contributed to a series of "Health Lectures for the People" delivered in Edinburgh during the winter of 1881–2. His lectures on "The Brain and its Functions" debunked the science of phrenology and used visual demonstrations to teach the public about the brain.

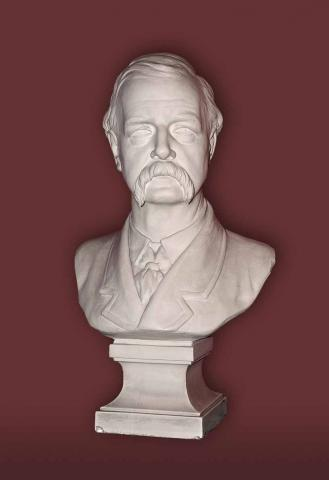
Bust of Sir John Batty Tuke at the Royal College of Physicians of Edinburgh by John Hutchison

In 1894 Tuke was again appointed to the Morison Lectureship at the RCPE and chose "The Insanity of Over-exertion of the Brain" as his topic. This series would be the culmination of Tuke's theory of physical disease as the cause of mental illness. Tuke proposed that both the public and profession had been hampered by Hippocratic classifications of insanity that were entirely psychological and led to an ignorance of brain anatomy, physiology and pathology, and a focus on behavioural symptoms. He condemned the popular notion the public needed protection from lunatics as well as the idea that insanity was manifested through perversion of the intellect. According to Tuke these elements had combined to create communities and medical terminology that regarded insanity as "a disease of the mind".

Tuke directly avoided the task of trying to explain "the dynamics of delusion" and focused on his theory of cell overexertion by injury, parasitism, deficient cell functioning or defective cell growth. By focusing on cell functioning and cure through rest and nutrition, Tuke rejected attributions of moral infirmity or deficiency in the insane. Tuke saw these ideas as slowing the progress of treatment and scientific understanding since they "construct a psychological nexus between cause and symptom without demonstration of structural change in cortical tissues". Tuke heralded the study of mental illness through brain anatomy as the way to "a rational system of treatment”and enjoined his colleagues to consider their patients "first as invalids and as an insane person after".

Aside from the immediate exposure of the lecture hall Tuke's talks were published in London and Edinburgh as well as in the Journal of Mental Science. He was noticed and respected by his contemporaries and a few years later received his first honorary degree (D.Sc.) from Trinity College, Dublin where he was praised for having made "the first important step in the very obscure subject of the connection of the anatomy of the brain with mental derangement."

In 1895 Tuke became president of the RCPE. In 1898 he was knighted and later that year gave the "Address in Psychology" at the annual general meeting of the British Medical Association. Tuke's career as a psychiatrist ended with his election to parliament in 1900 as MP for Edinburgh and St Andrews Universities. Once elected Tuke served in this role for ten years. In 1902 he was elected a member of the Aesculapian Club.

Tuke lived at 20 Charlotte Square a very fine and large Georgian townhouse in Edinburgh's First New Town. Tuke died in Edinburgh on 13 October 1913. His death was reported in several prominent medical journals and in The Scotsman newspaper.

He is buried in Warriston Cemetery in Edinburgh, on the north side of the central roundel, south of the central vaults.

Tuke received an LL.D. (honoris causa) from the University of Edinburgh in March 1902.

== Family ==
In 1856 he married Lydia Jane Magee.

His sister Catherine Tuke (d.1863) married Dr John Smith FRSE.

His daughter Catherine Tuke married Dr John Fraser FRSE (1844–1925) Commissioner in Lunacy for Scotland 1895–1910.

Academic offices
Preceded by William Tennant Gairdner	President of the Royal College of Physicians of Edinburgh; 1895–1898	Succeeded by James Andrew
Parliament of the United Kingdom
Preceded by Sir William Overend Priestley	Member of Parliament for Edinburgh and St Andrews Universities; 1900 – January 1910	Succeeded by Sir Robert Finlay
