= Watson Cheyne =

Scottish surgeon and bacteriologist

Surgeon Rear-Admiral Sir Watson Cheyne Bt KCMG CB FRS FRCS
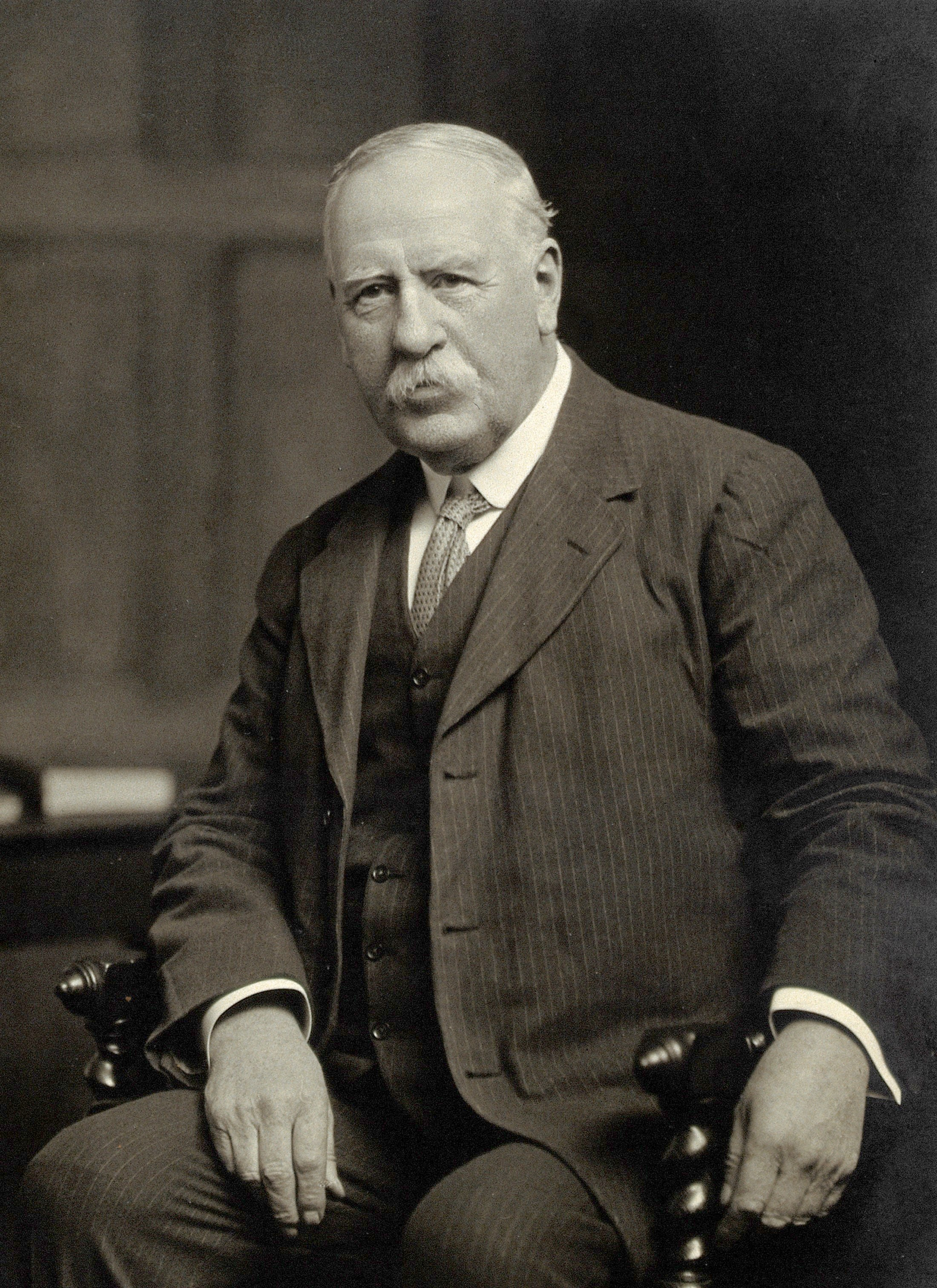
- Born: 14 December 1852; Hobart, Tasmania
- Died: 19 April 1932 (aged 79)
- Education: University of Aberdeen
- Awards: Lister Medal (1924)
- Scientific career
- Fields: Bacteriology

Surgeon Rear-Admiral Sir William Watson Cheyne, 1st Baronet, KCMG, CB, FRS, FRCS (14 December 1852 – 19 April 1932) was a Scottish surgeon and bacteriologist who pioneered the use of antiseptic surgical methods in the United Kingdom.

== Early life and education ==
Cheyne was born at sea off Hobart, Tasmania. His father, Andrew Cheyne, was the eldest of two illegitimate children born to James Cheyne, who was the youngest brother of John Cheyne, the Laird of Tangwick (Northmavine, Shetland). His father grew up at Tangwick Haa and went to sea around the age of twelve, rising to command a brig in the Far East at the age of 22. His mother Eliza, the daughter of the Rev. William Watson, died in 1856, leaving William Cheyne to be brought up by his grandfather, the Rev. William Watson, and latterly by his aunt and uncle-in-law, in Fetlar.

In 1864, he was sent to Aberdeen Grammar School, and he remained there until 1868 when he went to King's College, Aberdeen to study for an Arts degree, which he did not complete. His uncle and aunt wished him to train for the ministry, but like his father, his own inclination was for the sea. With the idea that if he became a doctor he could join the navy, he entered the University of Edinburgh to study medicine in May 1871. He completed his degree in medicine and surgery in 1875. Two years later he won the Syme Surgical Fellowship for his thesis, "Record of some work done during the winter session 1876-77".

== Career ==
=== Medical career ===
Cheyne became the house surgeon to Joseph Lister, the British founder of antiseptic medicine, in 1876. Bacteriology had been much researched in France and Germany in the 1870s and 80s, but little work was done in the field in Britain. Lister was one of the few pioneers of its study in Britain. In 1877, the two took positions at King's College Hospital, where Cheyne served as an assistant surgeon, and later as a surgeon from 1880 to 1917 and also as a professor of surgery from 1891 to 1917. He was a devoted follower of Lister and his antiseptic surgical methods. Cheyne was greatly inspired by the work of German bacteriologist Robert Koch, and translated his work Untersuchungen über die Aetiologie der Wundinfenktionskrankheiten (1878) for the New Sydenham Society in 1880, which greatly enhanced the acceptance of bacteriology in Britain. He had a work published in 1882, Antiseptic Surgery: Its Principles, Practice, History and Results, and later in 1925 a book, Lister and His Achievement. The work he did in his early career on bacteria and preventative medicine was highly influenced by Koch, and in Spring 1886, Cheyne visited Koch's laboratory in Berlin and studied his methods. He undertook trials on tuberculin and reported his findings to the RMCS in April 1891. He found that giving repeated doses improved the condition of patients, but rarely acted as a cure. His paper was recognized as the first important contribution to the topic in France. He was elected a Fellow of the Royal Society in 1894.

Cheyne defended vivisection and criticized the arguments of anti-vivisectionists.

=== Military service ===
Cheyne served during the Boer War as a consulting surgeon for the British military in South Africa from 1900 to 1901. In a despatch dated 31 March 1900, the Commander-in-Chief in South Africa, Lord Roberts, described how Cheyne had "rendered invaluable service by ... advice and assistance to the Medical Officers" and "been unwearying in ... work among the wounded and sick". In 1910 he was made Honorary Surgeon-in-Ordinary to King George V. With the outbreak of World War I, he became a consulting surgeon to the Royal Navy in 1914, and in 1915 was for a short time temporary Surgeon General, RN. He was later made Surgeon Rear-Admiral and KCMG. From 1914 to 1916, he served as President of the Royal College of Surgeons of England, and in 1924 he was awarded the inaugural Lister Medal for his contributions to surgical science. The following year, he delivered the first Lister Memorial Lecture. He was made a baronet in 1908.

=== Political career ===
In 1917, he was elected a Unionist Member of Parliament (MP) for Edinburgh and St Andrews Universities and for the Combined Scottish Universities in 1918, holding the seat until he stepped down at the 1922 general election.

== Later life ==
He was appointed Lord Lieutenant of Orkney and Shetland in 1919. Cheyne left London in the early 1920s and retired to Fetlar. He resigned his position as Lord Lieutenant in 1930. He died in 1932 aged 79 at a sanatorium in England after a prolonged illness.

== Works ==
- Antiseptic Surgery: Its Principles, Practice, History and Results (1882)
- Lister and His Achievement (1885)
- Manual of the Antiseptic Treatment of Wounds (1885)
- Manual of Surgical Treatment, 7 vol. (1899–1903; with F. Burghard)

== Surgical Instrument ==
Cheyne has also been immortalized in the naming of the commonly used Vascular Surgery instrument the 'Watson Cheyne Dissector', which is used in endarterectomy procedures to help separate atherosclerotic plaque from the arterial wall. The instrument usually is constructed with two differing tips, a probe tip and an elevator tip.

== See also ==
- List of honorary medical staff at King Edward VII's Hospital for Officers

Parliament of the United Kingdom
| Preceded by Christopher Nicholson Johnston | Member of Parliament for Edinburgh & St Andrews Universities; 1917 – 1918 | Constituency abolished |
| New constituency | Member of Parliament for Combined Scottish Universities; 1918 – 1922; With: Dugald Cowan; Sir Henry Craik | Succeeded by Dugald Cowan; Sir Henry Craik; Sir George Berry |
Honorary titles
| Vacant Title last held by Malcolm Alfred Laing | Lord Lieutenant of Orkney and Shetland; 1919–1930 | Succeeded by Alfred Baikie |
Baronetage of the United Kingdom
| New creation | Baronet (of Leagarth); 1908–1932 | Succeeded by Joseph Lister Cheyne |
