= Moir Tod Stormonth Darling, Lord Stormonth-Darling =

Scottish Conservative politician and judge

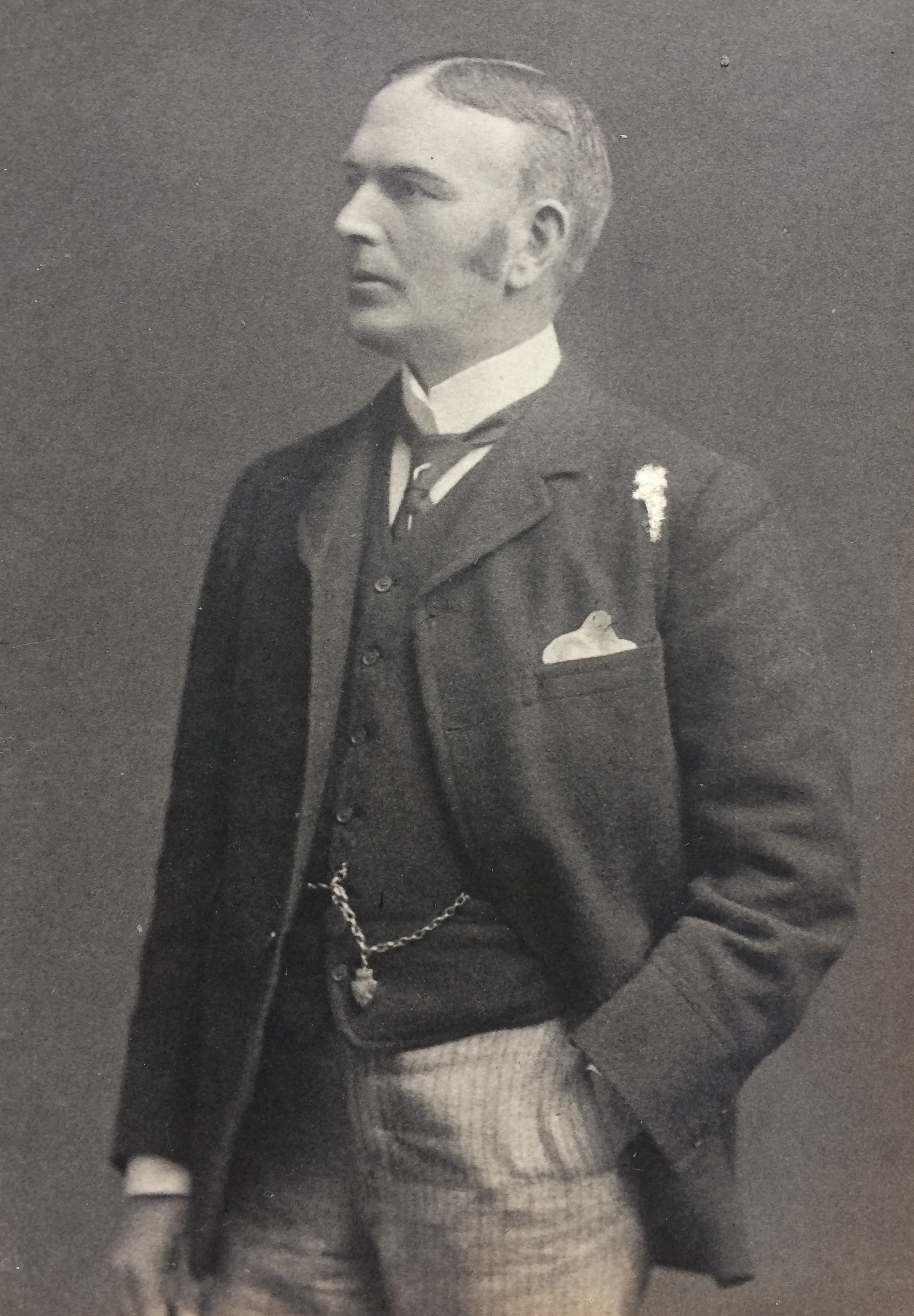
Lord Stormonth Darling

Moir Tod Stormonth Darling, Lord Stormonth-Darling FRSE DL LLD (3 November 1844 – 2 June 1912) was a Scottish Conservative Party politician and judge.

== Life ==
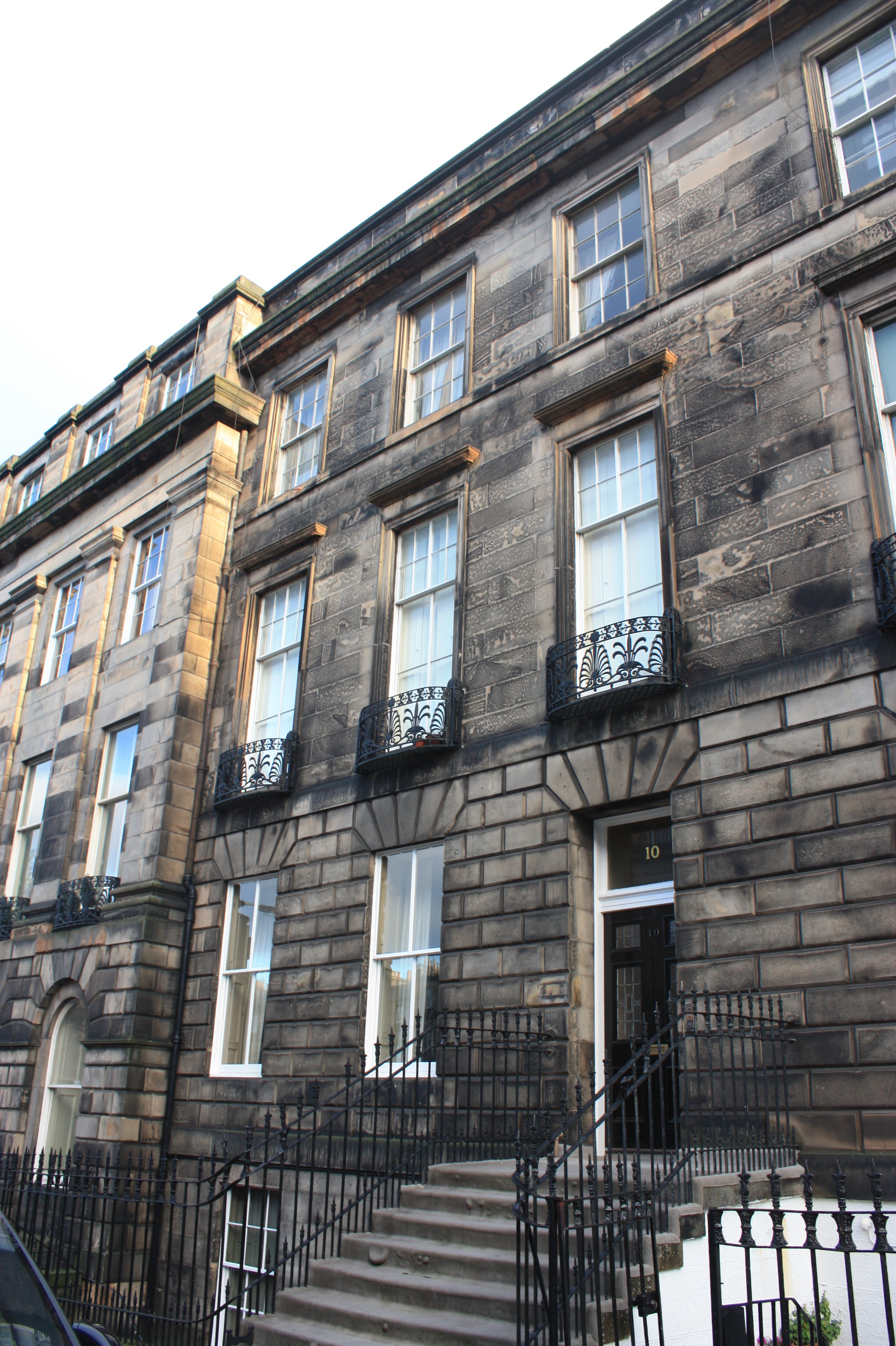
Stormonth-Darling's house at 10 Great Stuart Street, Edinburgh

Stormonth-Darling was born on 3 November 1844, the son of Elizabeth Moir Tod, daughter James Tod of, Deanstoun, and James Stormonth Darling of Lednathie WS (1830–1881). The family lived at 40 Drummond Place in Edinburgh's New Town.

He was educated at Kelso Grammar School then studied law at the University of Edinburgh, graduating with an MA.

In November 1888, he was elected in an unopposed by-election as the Member of Parliament (MP) for Edinburgh and St Andrews Universities. from 1888 appointed as Solicitor General for Scotland. He resigned the seat in 1890, when he was appointed to judiciary as a Lord of Session, an office which he held until 1908

In 1897 he was President of the Edinburgh Sir Walter Scott Club and gave the Toast to Sir Walter at the club's annual dinner. In 1900 he featured in a set of Copes cigarette cards of well known golfers. The card, numbered 49, depicts him standing in a bunker and is entitled "Duffers Yet".

He was a Director of both Scottish Provident and the Bank of Scotland, a member of the Court of the University of Edinburgh, a Railway Commissioner for Scotland and (like his father) a member of the Royal Company of Archers. He wrote books on golf and also collected ballads.

In later years he lived at Balvarran in Perthshire and 10 Great Stuart Street, an impressive Georgian townhouse on the Moray Estate in Edinburgh's West End.

He died at home on 2 June 1912 aged 67.

== Family ==
He was married to Ethel Hay Young, daughter of Major William Baird Young (a relation of Brigham Young), in 1892.

His parents are buried together in the small graveyard at Buccleuch Parish Church.

Parliament of the United Kingdom
Preceded by John Macdonald	Member of Parliament for Edinburgh & St Andrews Universities; 1888–1890	Succeeded by Charles Pearson
Legal offices
Preceded by James Robertson	Solicitor General for Scotland; 1888–1890	Succeeded by Sir Charles Pearson
