= James Frederick Strachan =

Scottish lawyer (1894–1978)

James Frederick Strachan, Lord Strachan LLD (1894–1978) was a 20th-century Scottish lawyer who served as a Senator of the College of Justice.

== Life ==
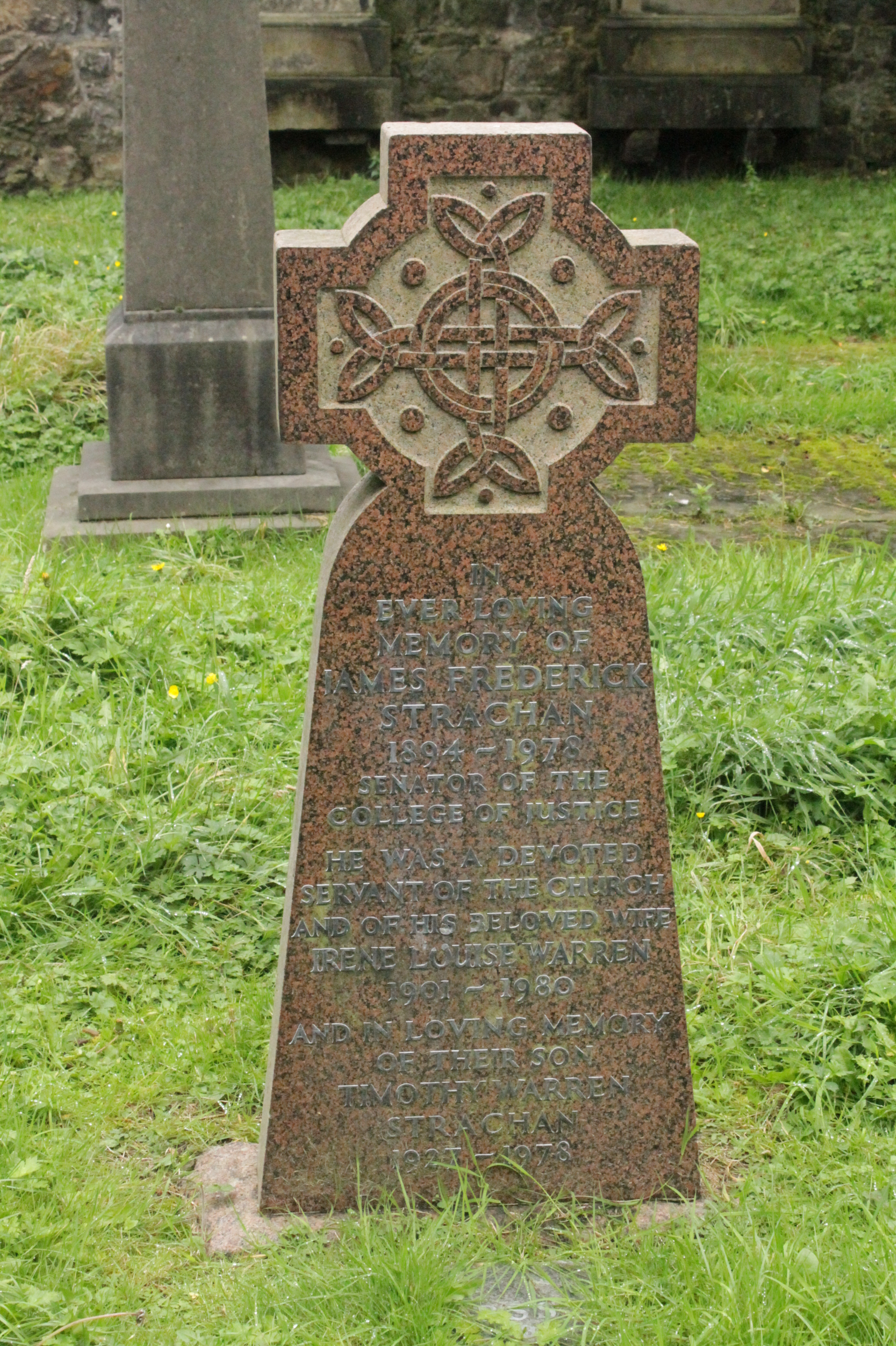
The grave of Lord Strachan, St Cuthbert's churchyard, Edinburgh

He was born in 1894 the son of James Kelt Strachan of Errol (1860–1932) and his wife, Elizabeth Hyslop Sutherland. His father was an organist and teacher of music. In 1911 they were living at 251 Renfrew Street in Glasgow.

He studied law at Glasgow University graduating MA in 1921.

From 1938 to 1948 he was Procurator to the General Assembly of the Church of Scotland.

From 1942 to 1945 he was Sheriff of Argyll and Sheriff of Perth and Angus from 1945 to 1948.

In October 1948 he was appointed a Senator of the College of Justice under the title of Lord Strachan. In Edinburgh he was a member of the Speculative Society.

He is buried in the northern section of the churchyard of St Cuthbert's Church, Edinburgh. The grave lies in the centre of the grass section towards the west end.
