= Connellite =

Halide mineral

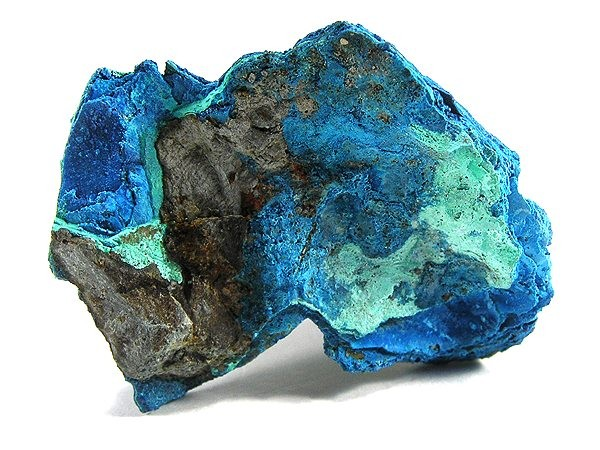

General
- Category: Halide mineral
- Formula: Cu_{19}(OH)_{32}(SO_{4})Cl_{4}·3H_{2}O
- IMA symbol: Cnl
- Strunz classification: 3.DA.25
- Crystal system: Hexagonal
- Crystal class: Dihexagonal dipyramidal (6/mmm); H-M symbol: (6/m 2/m 2/m)
- Space group: P6_{3}/mmc
- Unit cell: a = 15.78 Å, c = 9.10 Å; Z = 1

Identification
- Color: Azure blue, blue green
- Crystal habit: Clusters of divergent acicular crystals, fibrous, crusts
- Cleavage: None
- Fracture: Splintery
- Tenacity: Brittle
- Mohs scale hardness: 3
- Luster: Vitreous
- Streak: Pale green-blue
- Diaphaneity: Translucent
- Specific gravity: 3.36 to 3.41
- Optical properties: Uniaxial (+)
- Refractive index: n_{ω} = 1.724 – 1.746 n_{ε} = 1.738 – 1.758
- Birefringence: δ = 0.014

Connellite is a rare mineral species, a hydrous copper chloro-sulfate, Cu_{19}(OH)_{32}(SO_{4})Cl_{4}·3H_{2}O, crystallizing in the hexagonal system. It occurs as tufts of very delicate acicular crystals of a fine blue color, and is associated with other copper minerals of secondary origin, such as cuprite and malachite. Its occurrence in Cornwall, England was noted by Philip Rashleigh in 1802, and it was first examined chemically by Prof Arthur Connell FRSE in 1847, after whom it is named.

The type locality is Wheal Providence at Carbis Bay in Cornwall. Outside Cornwall it has been found in over 200 locations worldwide including Namaqualand in South Africa and at Bisbee, Arizona (US).

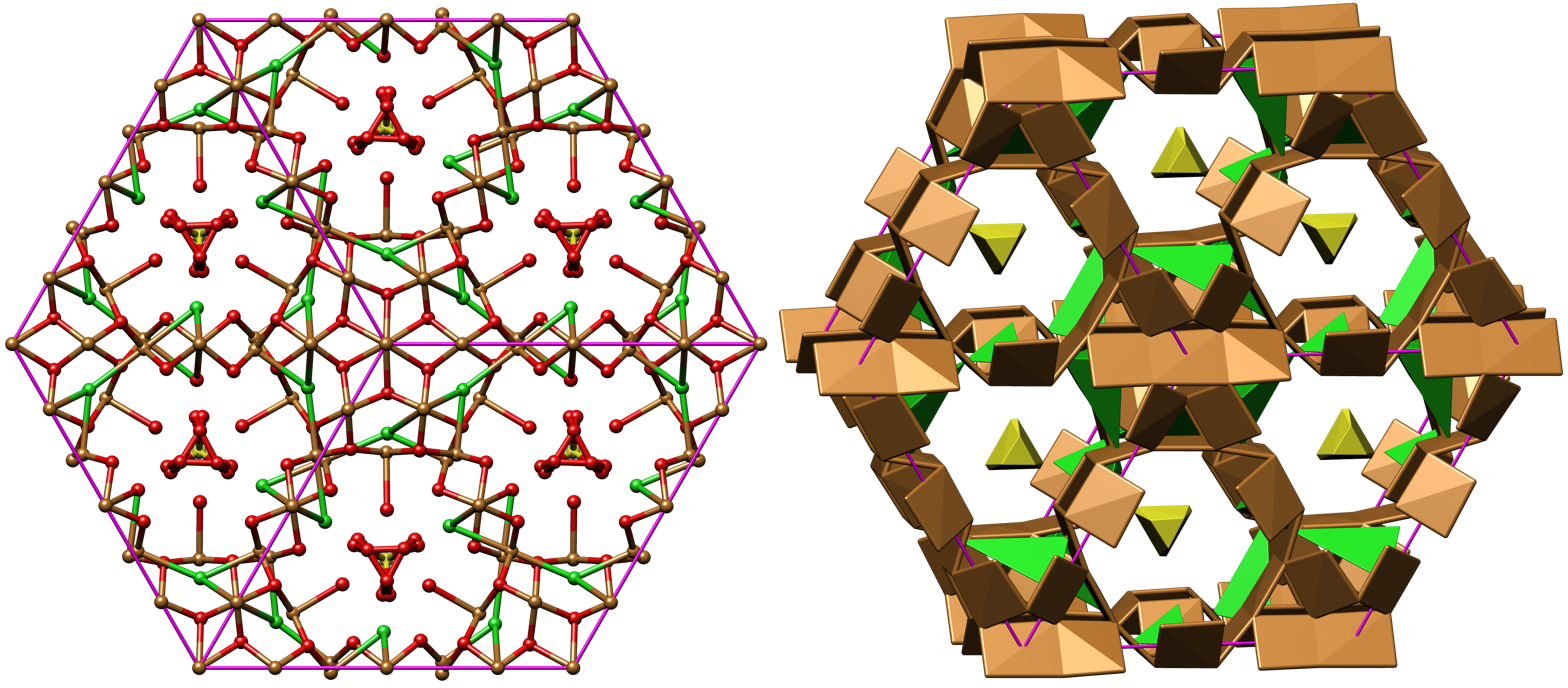
Connellite crystal structure: Color code: Cu: copper, S: olive, O: red, Cl: green; Cell: magenta
