= William Overend Priestley =

British physician and Conservative politician

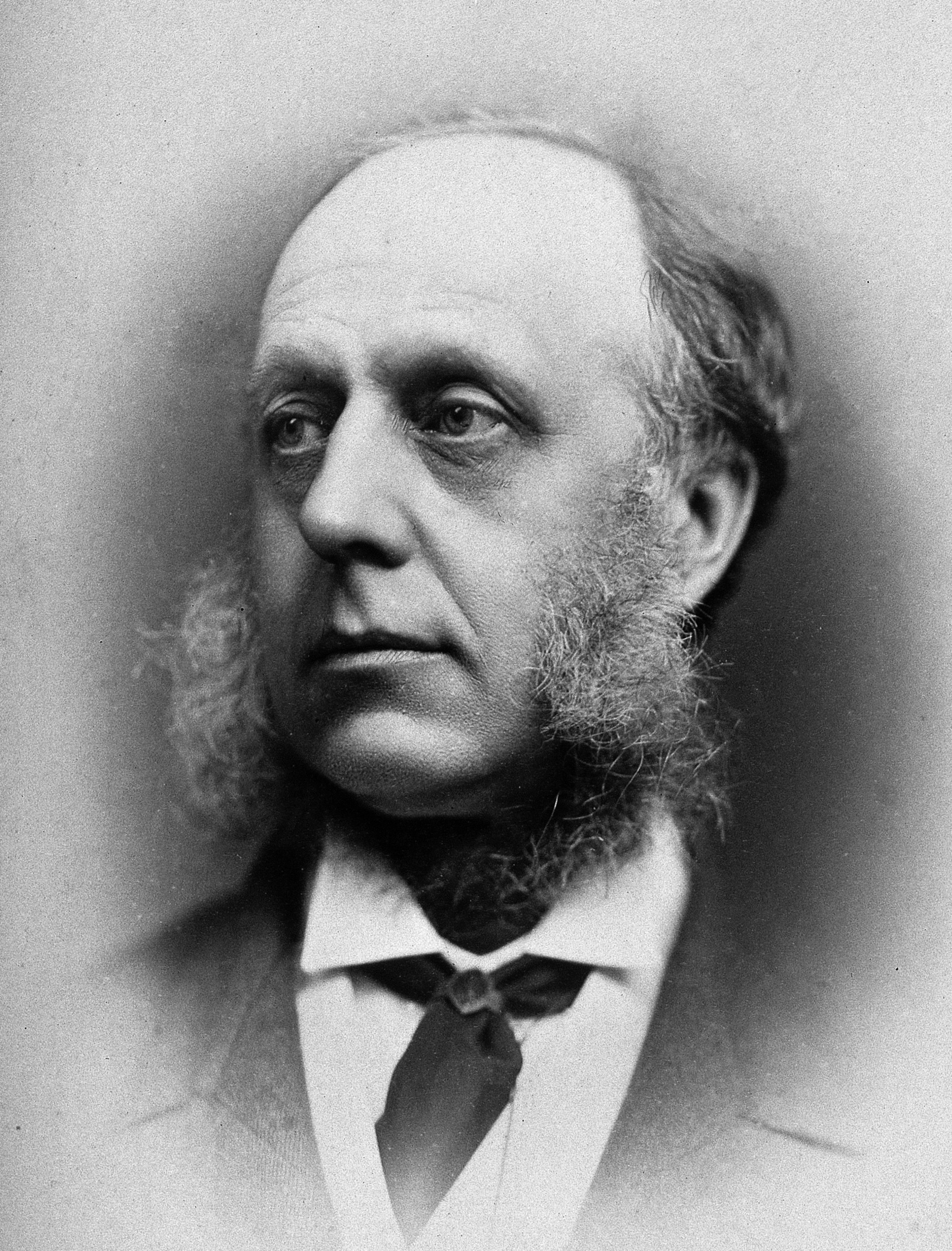
William Overend Priestley in 1881

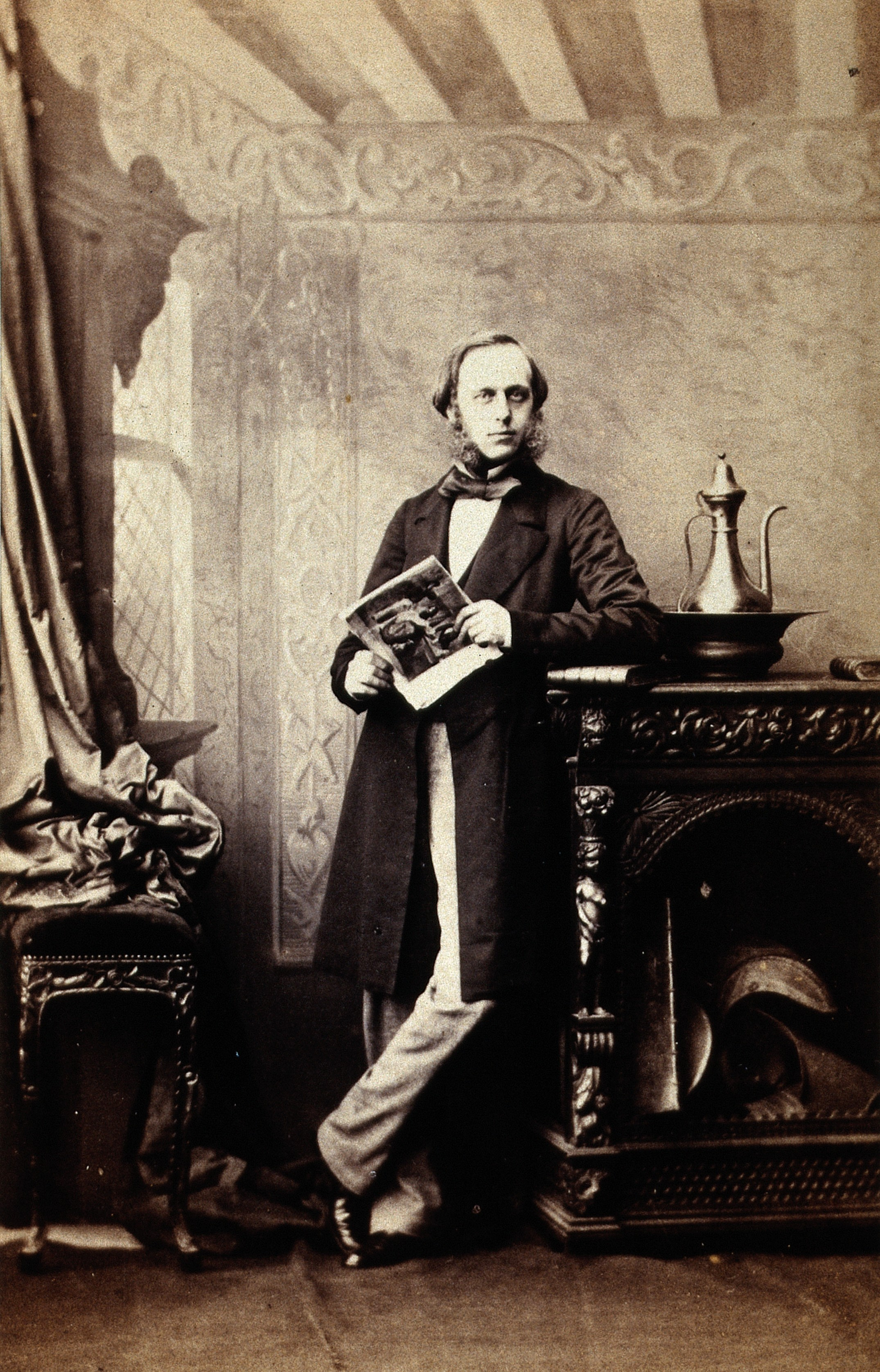
Sir William Overend Priestley circa 1860

Sir William Overend Priestley (24 June 1829 – 11 April 1900) was a British physician and Conservative Party politician. He served as Member of Parliament (MP) for Edinburgh and St Andrews Universities from 1896 to 1900.

Priestley was born in Leeds and trained in Edinburgh as an obstetrician and gynecologist. He moved to London in 1856, became a Fellow of the Royal College of Physicians of Edinburgh, and was knighted in 1893 in recognition of his medical services.

== Life ==
The eldest son of Joseph Priestley (the nephew of natural philosopher Joseph Priestley) and Mary, daughter of James Overend of Morley, he was born in Churwell, near Leeds, on 24 June 1829. When he was very young, the family moved to Morley Hall. He was educated at Leeds, King's College London, Paris, and the University of Edinburgh. He was admitted a member of the Royal College of Surgeons of England in 1852, and in 1853 he graduated M.D. at Edinburgh, taking as his thesis 'The Development of the Gravid Uterus.' (awarded Professor Simpson's gold medal and the senate gold medal). He was taught surgery by Prof Monro and Dr Robert Halliday Gunning.

Priestley acted as the private assistant of Sir James Young Simpson for some time after his graduation, but in 1856 he came to London and gave lectures at the Grosvenor Place School of Medicine. In 1858 he was appointed lecturer on midwifery at the Middlesex Hospital, and in 1862 he was elected professor of obstetric medicine at King's College London, and obstetric physician to King's College Hospital, in the place of Arthur Farre. These posts he resigned in 1872, and he was then appointed consulting obstetric physician to the hospital, becoming an honorary fellow of King's College and a member of the council.

Priestley was admitted a member of the Royal College of Physicians of London in 1859, and was chosen a fellow in 1864, serving as a member of the council 1878–80, Lumleian lecturer in 1887, and censor in 1891–92. He became a fellow of the Royal College of Physicians of Edinburgh in 1858, and from 1866 to 1876 he was an examiner in midwifery at the Royal College of Surgeons of England. He was, at different times, an examiner at the Royal College of Physicians of London and at the universities of Cambridge, London, and Victoria. He was president of the Obstetrical Society of London 1875–76, and was a vice-president of the Medical Society of Paris. He was a physician-accoucheur to H.R.H. Princess Louis of Hesse (Alice of England), and to Princess Christian of Schleswig-Holstein. The honorary degree of LL.D. was conferred upon him by the university of Edinburgh in 1884, and in 1893 he was knighted.

Early in his career he was attracted to politics in connection with professional subjects, and on 12 May 1896 he was elected without opposition as the parliamentary representative of the universities of Edinburgh and St Andrews in the Conservative interest, on the elevation of Sir Charles Pearson to the Scottish bench.

He died in London aged 70 on 11 April 1900, and was buried at Warnham, near Westbrook Hall, his estate in Sussex. Priestley married, on 17 April 1856, Eliza, the fourth daughter of Robert Chambers, by whom he had two sons and two daughters.

An image of his armorial bookplate:

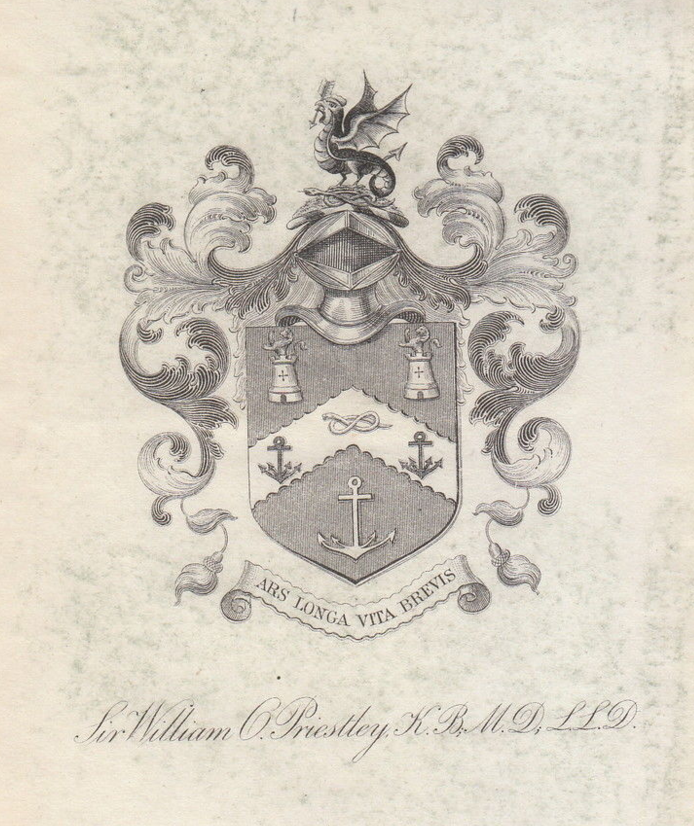

== Works ==
Priestley's works were:

- Lecture on the Development of the Gravid Uterus, London, 1860.
- The Pathology of Intra-uterine Death, being the Lumleian Lectures delivered at the Royal College of Physicians of London, March 1887, London, 1887.

He also edited, with Horatio Robinson Storer, the Obstetric Writings and Contributions of Sir James Y. Simpson, Edinburgh, 1855–6, 2 vols.

Parliament of the United Kingdom
Preceded by Charles Pearson	Member of Parliament for Edinburgh & St Andrews Universities; 1896–1900	Succeeded by John Batty Tuke
