= Arthur Connell =

Scottish chemist and mineralogist

Arthur Connell FRS FRSE (30 November 1794 – 31 October 1863) was a Scottish chemist and mineralogist. The mineral Connellite is named after him. He was a Fellow of the Royal Society of London.

== Life ==
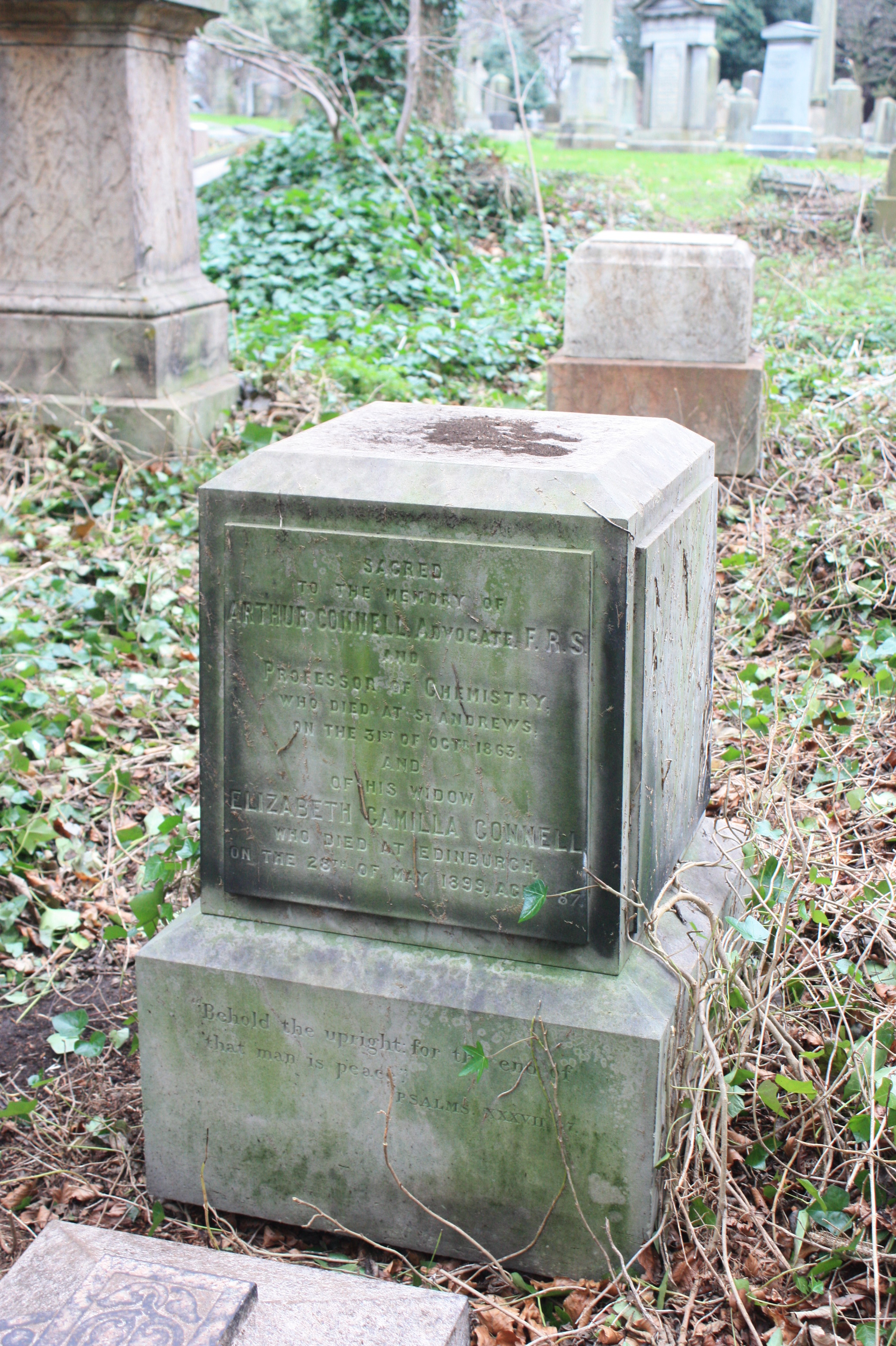
The grave of Prof Arthur Connell, Warriston Cemetery, Edinburgh

He was born in Edinburgh on 30 November 1794, the son of Sir John Connell (1765-1831), Judge of the Admiralty Court and his wife, Margaret Campbell (daughter of Sir Ilay Campbell, Lord Succoth). His paternal grandfather was Arthur Connell, Lord Provost of Glasgow.

Connell was educated at the High School in Edinburgh and then trained to be an advocate, qualifying in 1817. He studied at Edinburgh, Glasgow and Oxford Universities. His interests moved from law to chemistry and from 1840 to 1856 he was Professor of Chemistry at St Andrews University.

He was elected a Fellow of the Royal Society of Edinburgh in 1829, his proposer being John Borthwick. He was elected a Fellow of the Royal Society of London in 1855.

In 1847 he discovered a new mineral: originally described as a sulphato-chloride of copper, now known as Connellite.

He lived at 67 North Street in St Andrews. In later years he was assisted by Matthew Forster Heddle.

He died in St Andrews on 31 October 1863. He is buried in Warriston Cemetery in Edinburgh behind the large red sandstone monument to Rev Peddie on the main east west path above the vaults. The grave is vandalised and the obelisk originally on the monument lies toppled to one side.

== Family ==
He married St James's, Westminster, London 1839 his cousin Elizabeth Camilla Connell (d.1899), s.p.
