= John Fraser (physician) =

Scottish physician

Dr John Fraser FRSE FRCPE (1844–1925) was a Scottish physician. He was Commissioner in Lunacy for Scotland from 1895 to 1910.

== Life ==
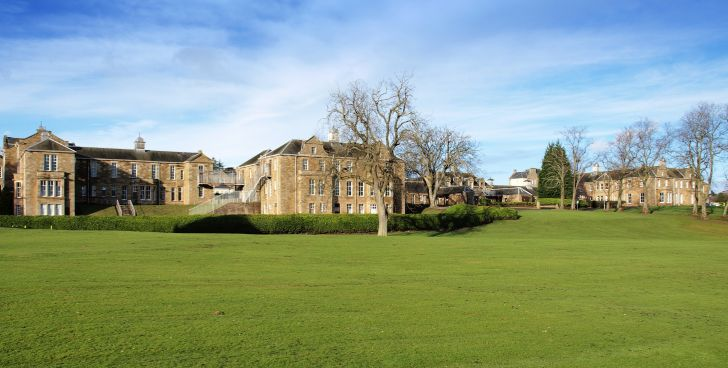
Stratheden Hospital

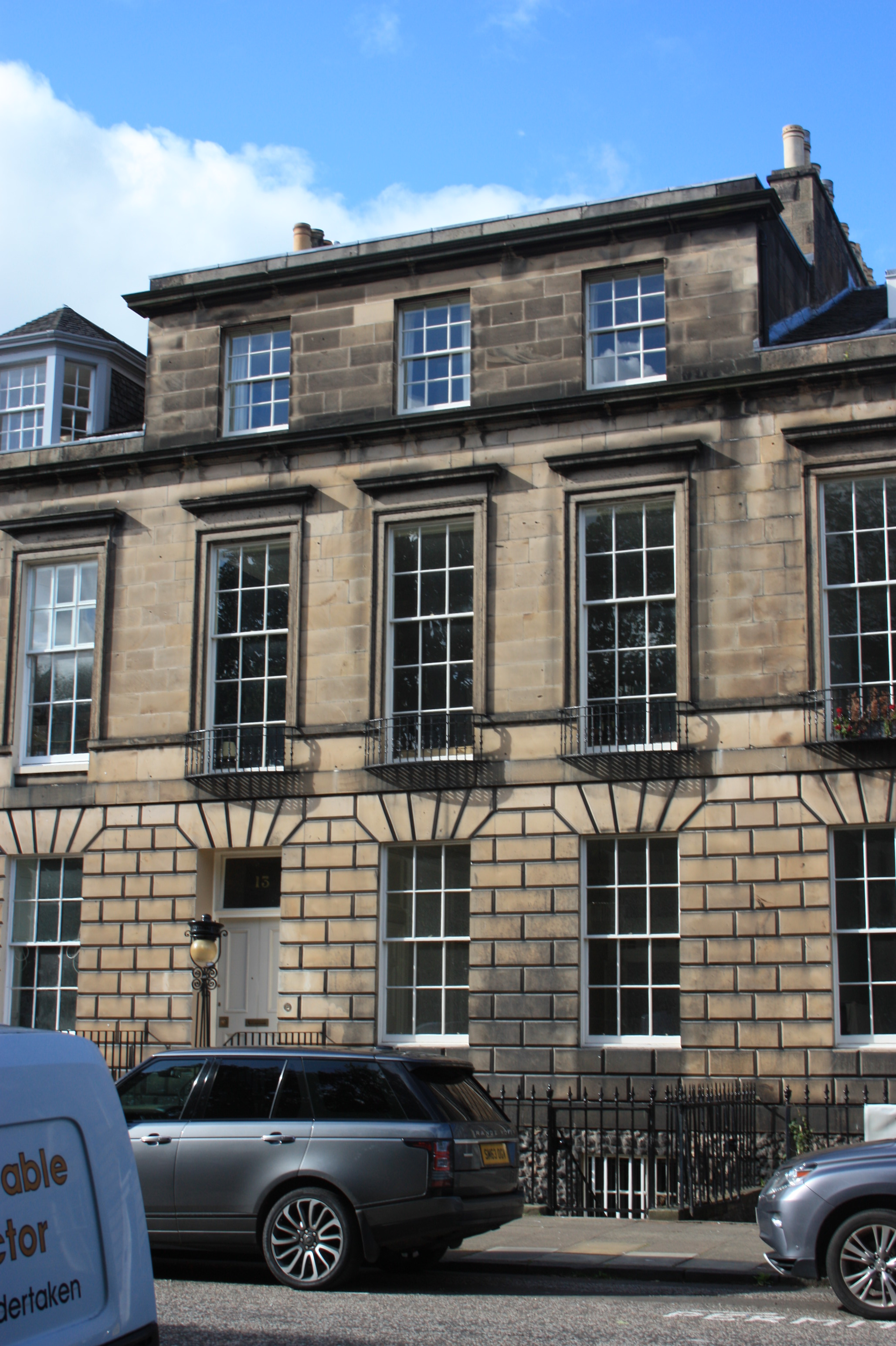
13 Heriot Row, Edinburgh

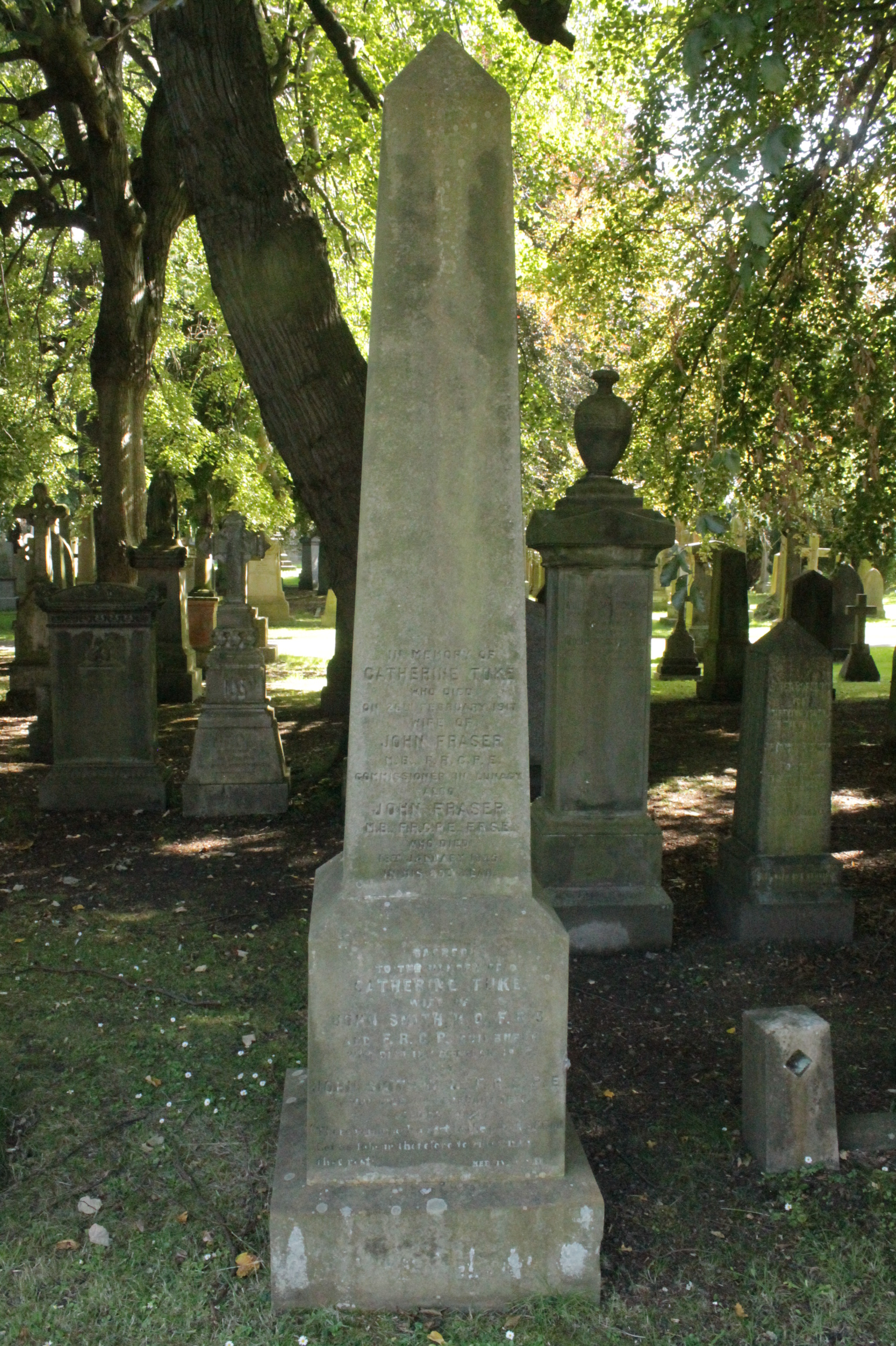
The grave of John Fraser FRSE, Dean Cemetery

He was born in Thornhill in Dumfriesshire in 1844 the son of John Fraser, a physician

He studied medicine at the University of Edinburgh graduating with an MB ChB in 1870. He joined the Fife and Kinross District Asylum (built near Cupar in 1866 and now known as Stratheden Hospital) under Dr John Batty Tuke.

In 1878 he was appointed Deputy Commissioner in Lunacy in Scotland. This took him to Edinburgh where he initially lived at 31 Regent Terrace on Calton Hill. This fine terraced house lies in an elevated position overlooking Holyrood Palace.

In 1895 he was appoint full Commissioner. In this role he oversaw around a dozen asylums and 15,000 patients. In these roles he worked closely with Dr Thomas Clouston of the Edinburgh Asylum, who was also a close neighbour (26 Heriot row).

In 1896 he was elected a Fellow of the Royal Society of Edinburgh. His proposers were Sir Andrew Douglas Maclagan, John Sibbald, Sir William Turner and Alexander Buchan.

His role as Commissioner of Lunacy was based at 51 Queen Street and he lived at 13 Heriot Row which faces that building across Queen Street Gardens. The house had previously been the home of George Ballingall.

He retired in 1910 and died on 18 January 1925. He is buried in Dean Cemetery in western Edinburgh.

== Family ==
He married Catherine Tuke (d.1917) the daughter of John Batty Tuke.
