= John Connell (judge) =

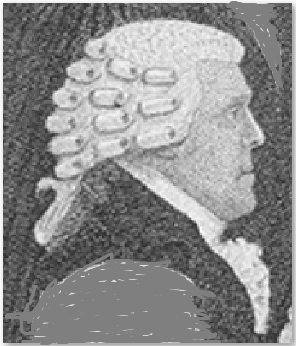
Sir John Cullen advocate

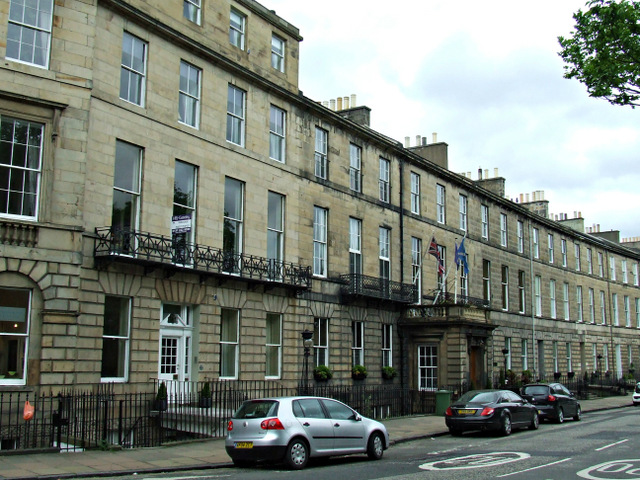
Abercromby Place in Edinburgh

Sir John Connell (c.1765–1831) was a Scottish legal author and judge, specialising in both church law and naval procedures.

== Life ==
He was born in Glasgow a younger son of Arthur Connell a merchant and his wife Magdalen Wallace. His father served as Lord Provost of Glasgow from 1772 to 1774, when John was still young.

He studied law at Glasgow University and passed the Scottish bar as an advocate around 1785 being created a member of the Faculty of Advocates in 1788.

In 1795 he was created Sheriff Depute of Renfrewshire. In 1805 he took on the additional role as Procurator to the General Assembly of the Church of Scotland.

In 1816 he was appointed Judge of the Court of the Admiralty, a position abolished in 1830. In 1822 he was knighted by King George IV during his visit to Scotland. From 1830 he was the senior member of the Faculty of Admiralty Procurators.

From around 1816 he lived in Edinburgh, residing his final years at 16 Abercromby Place in the Second New Town.

He died suddenly during a visit of his family to his brother-in-law Sir Archibald Campbell, 2nd Baronet at Garscube House north of Glasgow on 13 April 1831.

== Family ==
He married Margaret Campbell, a daughter of Sir Ilay Campbell, Lord President of the Court of Session, and their children included Arthur Connell FRSE.

== Publications ==
- Manses and Glebes of the Parochial Clergy
- Patronage of Churches (1818)
