= Christopher Johnston, Lord Sands =

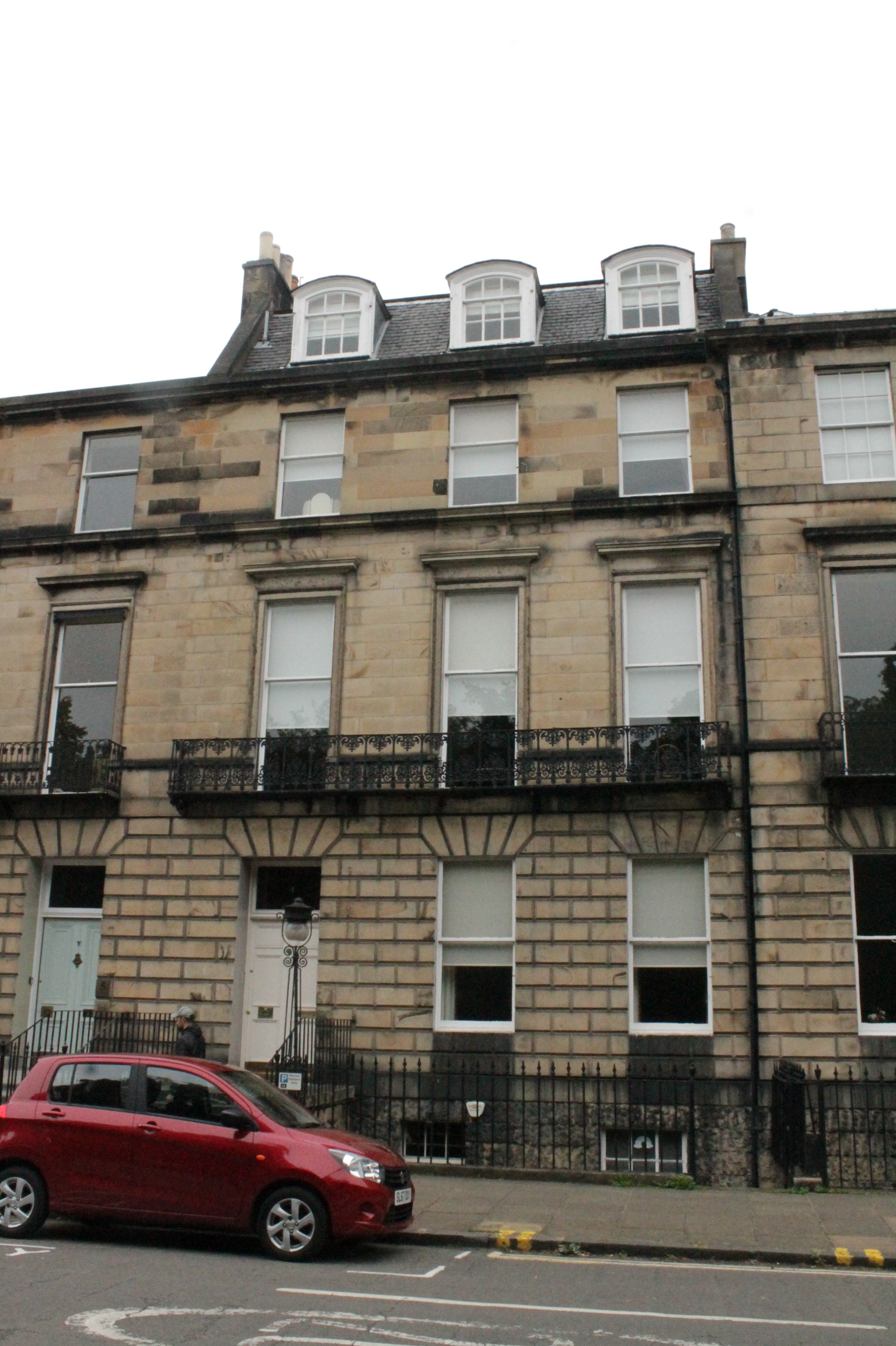
4 Heriot Row, Edinburgh

Christopher Nicholson Johnston, Lord Sands FRSE (18 October 1857 – 26 February 1934) was a Senator of the College of Justice in Scotland and Unionist MP for the Edinburgh and St Andrews Universities constituency between two by-elections in 1916 and 1917. He was an expert on Church Law and represented the Church of Scotland on many occasions.

== Life ==
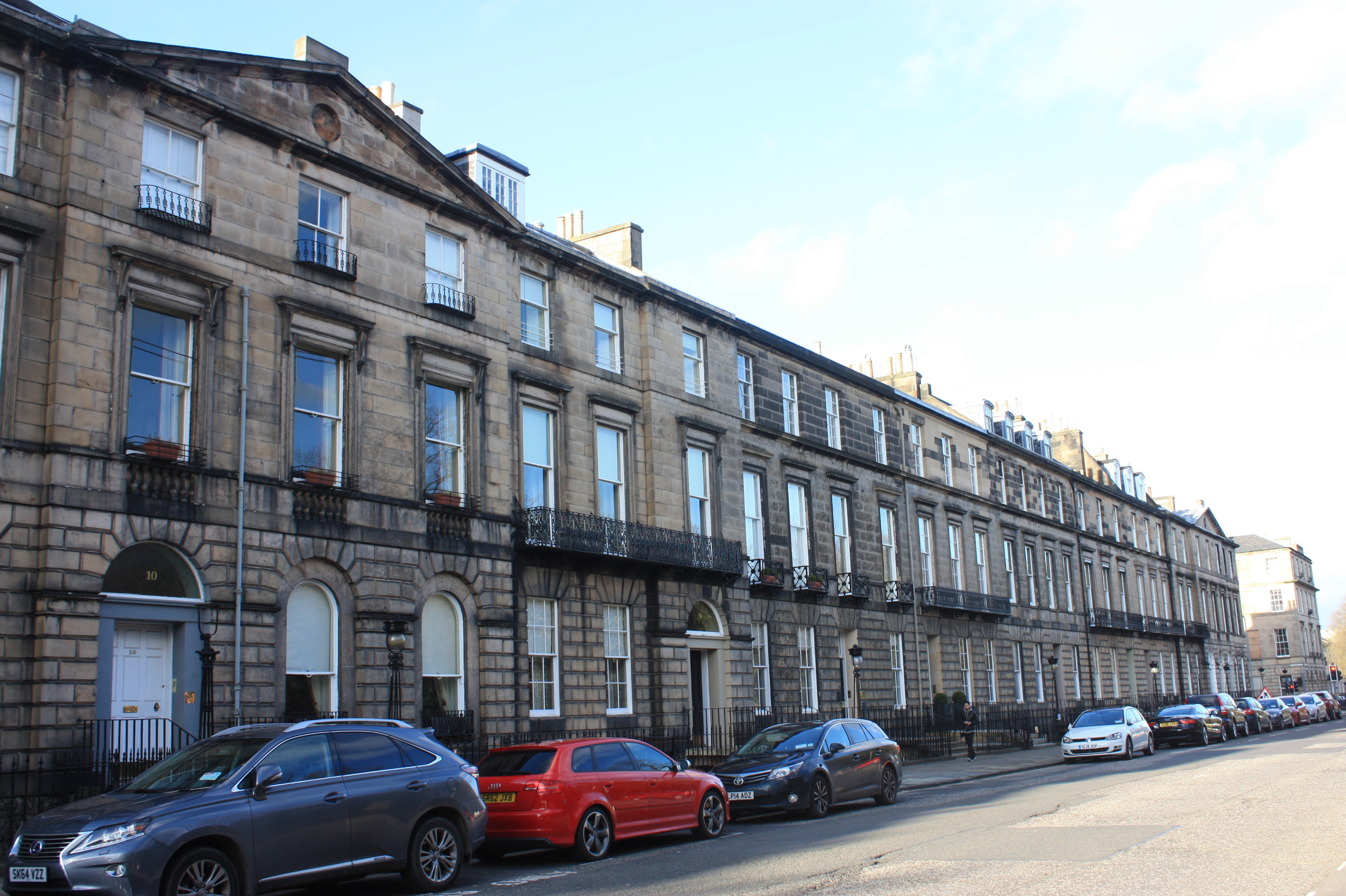
1-10 Heriot Row, Edinburgh

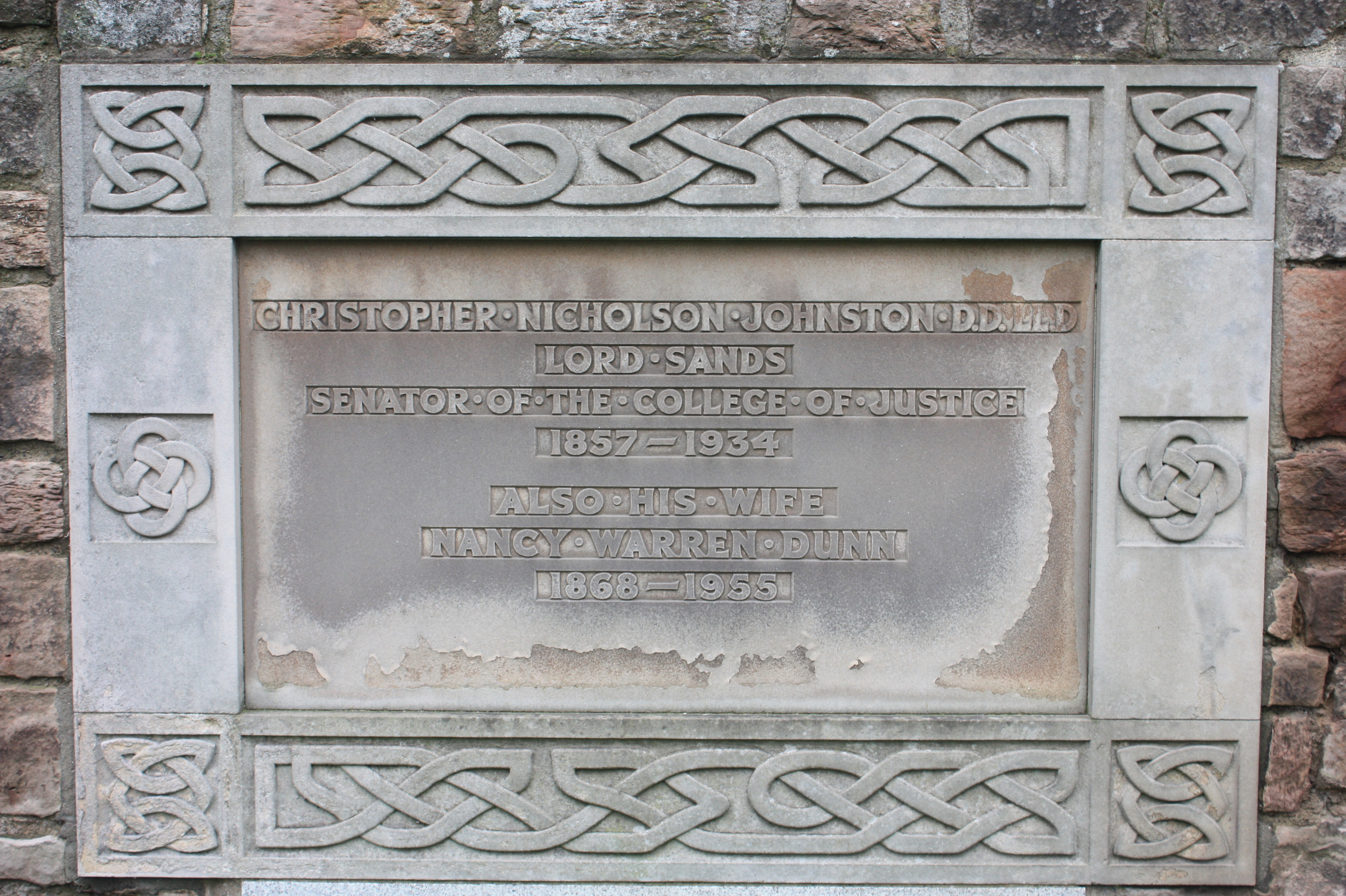
The grave of Christopher Nicholson Johnston, Dean Cemetery

He was born on 18 October 1857 in Kincardine, the son of Margaret Nicholson, daughter of Reverend Nicholson of Whithorn, and James Johnston of Mansionhouse of Sands (in Fife).

He studied law at Madras College, University of St Andrews, the University of Edinburgh and Heidelberg.

After training as a lawyer he made rapid progress in the profession: Advocate (1880); Advocate Depute (1892); Sheriff of Caithness, Orkney & Zetland (1899–1900); Sheriff of Inverness, Elgin & Nairn (1900–1905); Sheriff of Perthshire (1905–1916); Kings Counsel (10 June 1902). He was Procurator to the General Assembly of the Church of Scotland (1907–1918). He became a judge in 1908.

He served as an MP representing St Andrews and Edinburgh Universities 1916–17.

In 1917 he was created a Senator of the College of Justice and given the title Lord Sands.

From 1919 he was President of the Scottish Boys' Brigade. From 1921 he chaired the Carnegie Trust for University Education. He was awarded several honorary doctorates by the Scottish Universities including being created a Doctor of Divinity by the University of Edinburgh.

In 1925 he was elected a Fellow of the Royal Society of Edinburgh. His proposers were Sir James Alfred Ewing, Sir Edmund Whittaker, Sir Edward Albert Sharpey-Schafer, and Sir Thomas Hudson Beare. He served as the society's vice-president 1932–4.

He died in Edinburgh on 26 February 1934, aged 76. He is buried in the modern extension to Dean Cemetery off Queensferry Road in western Edinburgh. His grave lies against the north wall in the modern equivalent of Lord's Row in the original cemetery, forming one off a group of senators of the college of justice buried together. His wife lies with him.

== Family ==
In 1898 he married Agnes ("Nancy") Warren Dunn (1868–1955) of Dunmullin. They had two daughters and two sons, including James Wellwood Johnston and Alice Crawford Johnston CBE. They lived at 4 Heriot Row in Edinburgh's New Town.

== Publications ==
- The Ecclesiastical Law of Scotland.
- Episcopacy in Scotland. 1879.
- The Agricultural Holdings (Scotland) Act. 1883.
- The Crofters Holdings (Scotland) Act. 1886.
- The Handbook of Scottish Church Defence. 1892.
- Church Finance. 1905.
- Major Owen and Other Tales. 1909.
- The Seven Churches of Asia. 1916.
- John Blaw of Castlehill: Jacobite and Criminal. 1916.
- Dr Archibald Scott of St Georges, Edinburgh, and his times. 1919.
- Off the Chain. 1924. short stories
- The Story of St Stephens, Edinburgh 1828–1928. 1927.
- The Life of Wallace Williamson. 1929.
- Sir Walter Scott's Conge. 1929.
- Kinlochmoidart's Dirk and Other Tales. 1931.

Parliament of the United Kingdom
Preceded by Sir Robert Finlay	Member of Parliament for Edinburgh & St Andrews Universities; 1916 – 1917	Succeeded by Sir Watson Cheyne
