= Kemp Davidson, Lord Davidson =

Scottish lawyer (1929–2009)

The Hon Charles Kemp Davidson, Lord Davidson FRSE (13 April 1929 – 18 June 2009) was a Scottish lawyer who rose to be a Senator of the College of Justice and Dean of the Faculty of Advocates. He was Chairman of the Scottish Law Commission 1988 to 1996.

== Life ==
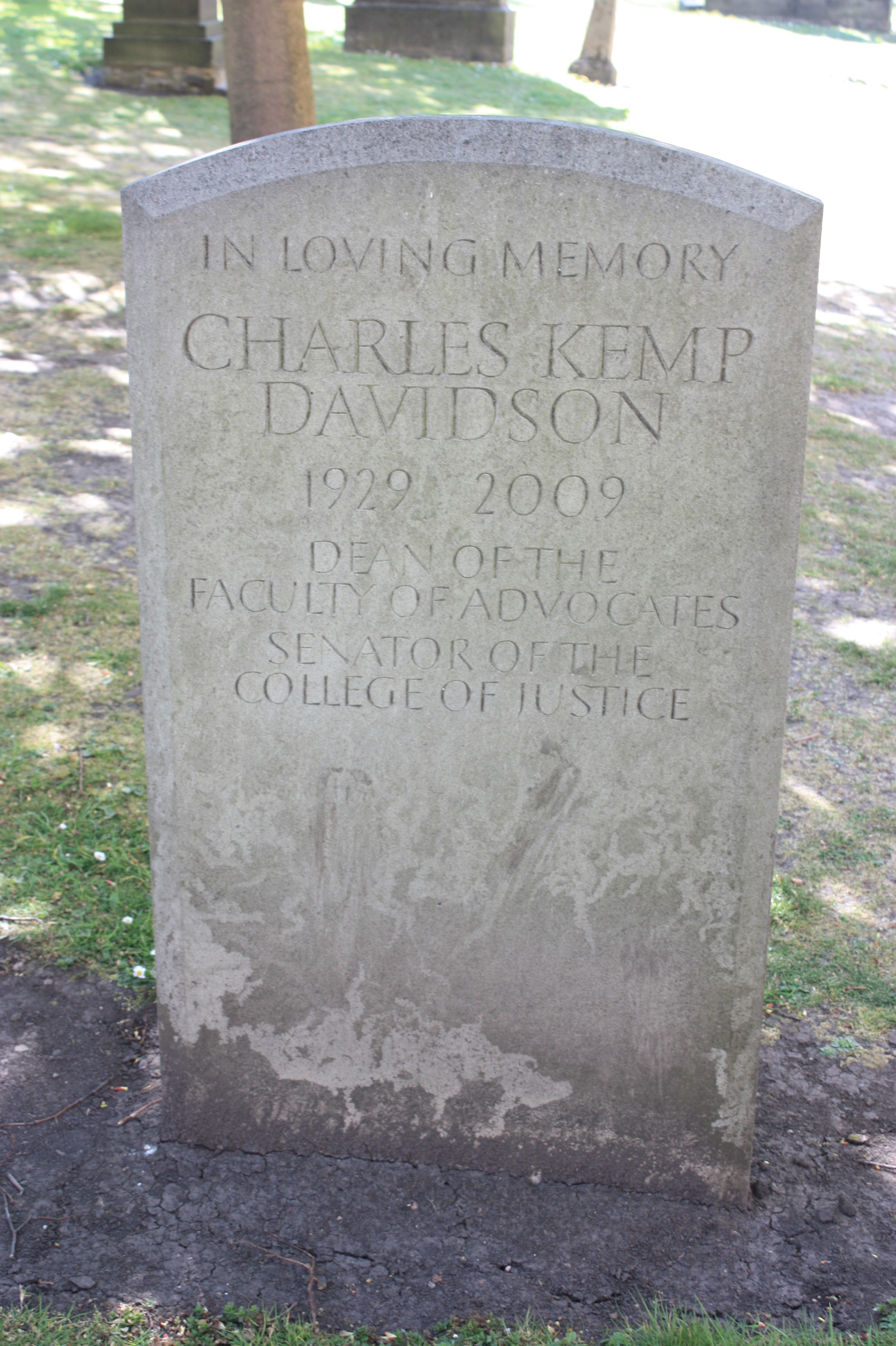
The grave of Charles Kemp Davidson, Greyfriars Kirkyard, Edinburgh

Davidson was born at Queen Mary Maternity Home in Edinburgh on 13 April 1929, the son of Charlotte Brookes Kemp and her husband, Rev Dr Donald Davidson (1892–1970) of St Andrews and St Georges Church. He was educated at Edinburgh Academy then Fettes College. He read Greats at Brasenose College, Oxford going on to study law at the University of Edinburgh.

From 1953 to 1954 he undertook National Service, as a subaltern in the Argyll and Sutherland Highlanders. During this time he served in British Guyana and Berlin.

He qualified as an advocate in 1956 and became Queen's Counsel in 1969. In 1983 he became a Senator of the College of Justice. He was a member of the Speculative Society of Edinburgh.

From 1988 until 1998 he was seconded as Chairman of the Scottish Law Commission.

In 1988 he was diagnosed with Parkinson's disease. He died on 18 June 2009 and was cremated, and his ashes are buried in Greyfriars Kirkyard.

== Family ==
In 1960 he married Mary Mactaggart of Campbeltown together they had two daughters and one son.
