= Colin Dunlop of Carmyle =

Scottish tobacco lord and banker (1706-1777)

Colin Dunlop
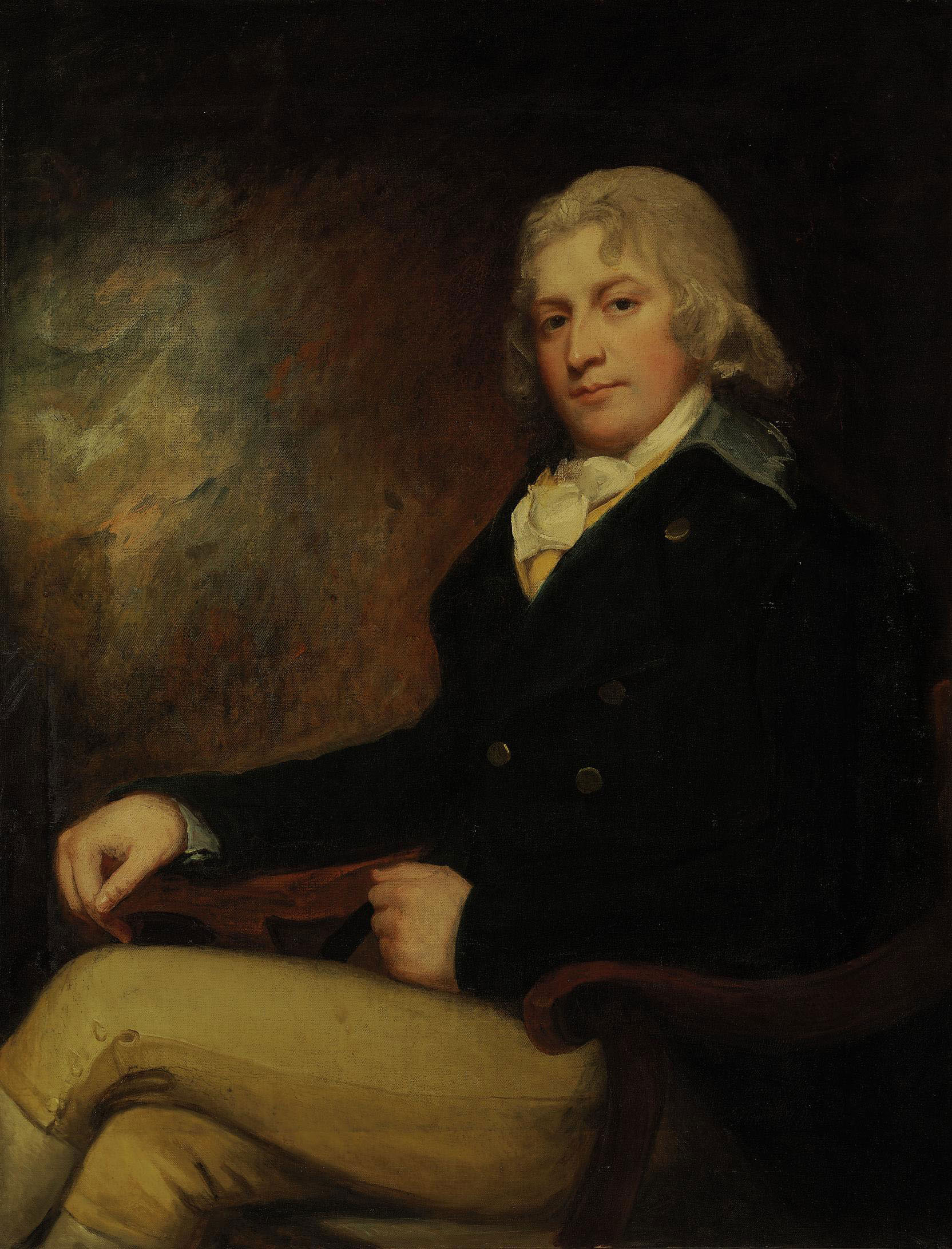
- Dunlop by George Romney, 1754
- Born: 7 January 1706; Garnkirk, Scotland
- Died: 13 August 1777 (aged 71)
- Children: John, 1 other son and daughter

Colin Dunlop of Carmyle (7 January 1706 – 13 August 1777) was an 18th-century Scottish tobacco lord and banker, who served as Lord Provost of Glasgow from 1770 to 1772.

== Life ==
He was born in Garnkirk on 7 January 1706 the sixth son of James Dunlop of Garnkirk (1655-1719) and his wife, Lilias Campbell (d.1709). His father was a tobacco merchant and one of the Glasgow "Virginia Dons" and was co-founder of the Old Ship Bank.

He became a Baile in Glasgow Town Council in 1747 and Dean of Guild in 1750. In 1750, he and his brother Robert Dunlop were amongst the 26 founders of the Ship Bank in Glasgow. In 1770, he succeeded James Buchanan of Drumpellier as Lord Provost. He was succeeded in turn in 1772 by Arthur Connell.

As a tobacco merchant with major plantations in Virginia he (as all others from Britain) lost their American estates in the American Revolution.

His large townhouse stood on the south side of Argyle Street and the adjacent street Dunlop Street was named in his honour.

He died on 13 August 1777.

== Family ==
In 1741 he married a widow, Margaret ("Martha") Bogle (1719-1768). She was born Margaret Bogle at Hamilton Farm.

His eldest son was James Dunlop of Tolcross and Garnkirk (1741-1816). James' son was Colin Dunlop of Tolcross (1775-1837) buried in the Glasgow Necropolis.

His second son, John Dunlop of Rosebank also served as Lord Provost.

His daughter Janet Dunlop married Thomas Donald of Geilston, also a tobacco lord in Virginia.
