= Edinburgh and St Andrews Universities =

Former parliamentary constituency in the United Kingdom

- Former university constituency for the House of Commons

1868–1918
- Seats: 1
- Replaced by: Combined Scottish Universities

Edinburgh and St Andrews Universities was a university constituency represented in the House of Commons of the Parliament of the United Kingdom from 1868 until 1918. It was merged with the Glasgow and Aberdeen Universities constituency to form the Combined Scottish Universities constituency.

== Electorate ==
As a university constituency, the constituency had no geographical basis. Instead, its electorate consisted of graduates from the University of Edinburgh and the University of St Andrews.

== Members of Parliament ==
| Election | Member | Party |
|---|---|---|
| 1868 | Lyon Playfair, later Baron Playfair | Liberal |
| 1885 | John Macdonald | Conservative |
| 1888 by-election | Moir Tod Stormonth Darling | Conservative |
| 1890 by-election | Sir Charles Pearson | Conservative |
| 1896 by-election | Sir William Overend Priestley | Conservative |
| 1900 by-election | Sir John Batty Tuke | Conservative |
| Jan. 1910 | Sir Robert Finlay, later Viscount Finlay | Liberal Unionist |
| 1912 | Sir Robert Finlay, later Viscount Finlay | Unionist |
| 1916 by-election | Christopher Nicholson Johnston | Unionist |
| 1917 by-election | Sir Watson Cheyne | Unionist |
| 1918 | constituency abolished: see Combined Scottish Universities | |

== Election results ==
=== Elections in the 1910s ===
By-election, 1917: Edinburgh & St Andrews Universities
| Party | Candidate | Votes | % | ±% |
|---|---|---|---|---|
| Unionist | Watson Cheyne | Unopposed | | |
| Unionist hold | | | | |

By-election, 1916: Edinburgh & St Andrews Universities
| Party | Candidate | Votes | % | ±% |
|---|---|---|---|---|
| Unionist | Christopher Nicholson Johnston | Unopposed | | |
| Unionist hold | | | | |

General election December 1910: Edinburgh & St Andrews Universities
| Party | Candidate | Votes | % | ±% |
|---|---|---|---|---|
| Liberal Unionist | Robert Finlay | Unopposed | | |
| Liberal Unionist hold | | | | |

General election January 1910: Edinburgh & St Andrews Universities
| Party | Candidate | Votes | % | ±% |
|---|---|---|---|---|
| Liberal Unionist | Robert Finlay | 5,205 | 65.9 | −2.0 |
| Liberal | Alexander Russell Simpson | 2,693 | 34.1 | N/A |
| Majority | | 2,512 | 31.8 | −4.0 |
| Turnout | | 7,898 | 69.8 | +5.1 |
| Registered electors | | 11,319 | | |
| Liberal Unionist hold | | Swing | | |

=== Elections in the 1900s ===
General election 1906: Edinburgh & St Andrews Universities
| Party | Candidate | Votes | % | ±% |
|---|---|---|---|---|
| Conservative | John Batty Tuke | 4,893 | 67.9 | N/A |
| Free Trader | John Strachey | 2,310 | 32.1 | N/A |
| Majority | | 2,583 | 35.8 | N/A |
| Turnout | | 7,203 | 64.7 | N/A |
| Registered electors | | 11,131 | | |
| Conservative hold | | Swing | N/A | |

General election 1900: Edinburgh & St Andrews Universities
| Party | Candidate | Votes | % | ±% |
|---|---|---|---|---|
| Conservative | John Batty Tuke | Unopposed | | |
| Conservative hold | | | | |

By-election, 1900: Edinburgh & St Andrews Universities
| Party | Candidate | Votes | % | ±% |
|---|---|---|---|---|
| Conservative | John Batty Tuke | Unopposed | | |
| Conservative hold | | | | |

=== Elections in the 1890s ===
By-election, 1896: Edinburgh and St Andrews Universities
| Party | Candidate | Votes | % | ±% |
|---|---|---|---|---|
| Conservative | William Priestley | Unopposed | | |
| Conservative hold | | | | |

- Pearson was raised to the Bench, as a Senator of the College of Justice.

General election 1895: Edinburgh and St Andrews Universities
| Party | Candidate | Votes | % | ±% |
|---|---|---|---|---|
| Conservative | Charles Pearson | Unopposed | | |
| Conservative hold | | | | |

General election 1892: Edinburgh and St Andrews Universities
| Party | Candidate | Votes | % | ±% |
|---|---|---|---|---|
| Conservative | Charles Pearson | Unopposed | | |
| Conservative hold | | | | |

By-election, 1890: Edinburgh and St Andrews Universities
| Party | Candidate | Votes | % | ±% |
|---|---|---|---|---|
| Conservative | Charles Pearson | Unopposed | | |
| Conservative hold | | | | |

- Stormonth-Darling was raised to the Bench, as a Senator of the College of Justice.

=== Elections in the 1880s ===
By-election, 6 Nov 1888: Edinburgh & St Andrews Universities
| Party | Candidate | Votes | % | ±% |
|---|---|---|---|---|
| Conservative | Moir Tod Stormont Darling | Unopposed | | |
| Conservative hold | | | | |

- Caused by Macdonald's appointment as Lord Justice Clerk, becoming Lord Kingsburgh.

By-election, 13 Aug 1886: Edinburgh & St Andrews Universities
| Party | Candidate | Votes | % | ±% |
|---|---|---|---|---|
| Conservative | John Macdonald | Unopposed | | |
| Conservative hold | | | | |

- Caused by Macdonald being appointed Lord Advocate.

General election 1886: Edinburgh & St Andrews Universities
| Party | Candidate | Votes | % | ±% |
|---|---|---|---|---|
| Conservative | John Macdonald | Unopposed | | |
| Conservative hold | | | | |

General election 1885: Edinburgh & St Andrews Universities
| Party | Candidate | Votes | % | ±% |
|---|---|---|---|---|
| Conservative | John Macdonald | 2,840 | 53.7 | +4.4 |
| Liberal | John Eric Erichsen | 2,453 | 46.3 | −4.4 |
| Majority | | 387 | 7.4 | N/A |
| Turnout | | 5,293 | 77.2 | −6.1 |
| Registered electors | | 6,860 | | |
| Conservative gain from Liberal | | Swing | +4.4 | |

General election 1880: Edinburgh & St Andrews Universities
| Party | Candidate | Votes | % | ±% |
|---|---|---|---|---|
| Liberal | Lyon Playfair | 2,522 | 50.7 | N/A |
| Conservative | Edward Robert Bickersteth | 2,448 | 49.3 | New |
| Majority | | 74 | 1.4 | N/A |
| Turnout | | 4,970 | 83.3 | N/A |
| Registered electors | | 5,966 | | |
| Liberal hold | | Swing | N/A | |

At Edinburgh Playfair had received 1,742 votes and Bickersteth 1,526, and at St Andrew's Playfair received 512 votes and Bickersteth 698. Eleven of Playfair's ballot papers had not been counted "Owing to certain information".

=== Elections in the 1870s ===
General election 1874: Edinburgh & St Andrews Universities
| Party | Candidate | Votes | % | ±% |
|---|---|---|---|---|
| Liberal | Lyon Playfair | Unopposed | | |
| Registered electors | | 4,861 | | |
| Liberal hold | | | | |

By-election, 4 Dec 1873: Edinburgh & St Andrews Universities
| Party | Candidate | Votes | % | ±% |
|---|---|---|---|---|
| Liberal | Lyon Playfair | Unopposed | | |
| Liberal hold | | | | |

- Caused by Playfair's appointment as Postmaster General of the United Kingdom.

=== Elections in the 1860s ===
General election 1868: Edinburgh & St Andrews Universities
| Party | Candidate | Votes | % | ±% |
|---|---|---|---|---|
| Liberal | Lyon Playfair | 2,322 | 52.9 | |
| Conservative | Archibald Campbell Swinton | 2,067 | 47.1 | |
| Majority | | 255 | 5.8 | |
| Turnout | | 4,389 | 89.9 | |
| Registered electors | | 4,880 | | |
| Liberal win (new seat) | | | | |
