= 1873 Edinburgh and St. Andrews Universities by-election =

UK parliamentary by-election

The 1873 Edinburgh and St. Andrews Universities by-election was held on 4 December 1873. The by-election was held due to the incumbent Liberal MP, Lyon Playfair, becoming Postmaster General. It was retained by Playfair, who was unopposed.
