= 1916 Edinburgh and St Andrews Universities by-election =

UK parliamentary by-election

The 1916 Edinburgh and St Andrews Universities by-election was held on 29 December 1916. The by-election was held due to the appointment as Lord Chancellor of the incumbent Conservative MP, Sir Robert Finlay. It was won by the Conservative candidate Christopher Nicholson Johnston. who was unopposed due to a War-time electoral pact.
