= 1917 Edinburgh and St Andrews Universities by-election =

UK parliamentary by-election

The 1917 Edinburgh and St Andrews Universities by-election was held on 10 August 1917. The by-election was held due to the incumbent Conservative MP, Sir Christopher Johnston, becoming a Senator of the College of Justice. It was won by the Conservative candidate Watson Cheyne, who was unopposed due to a War-time electoral pact.

At a meeting of the electors on 10 August 1917, Sir William Watson Cheyne, Professor of Clinical Surgery at King's College, London, was elected in place of Sir Christopher Nicholson Johnston KC, who has been appointed to judicial office.
