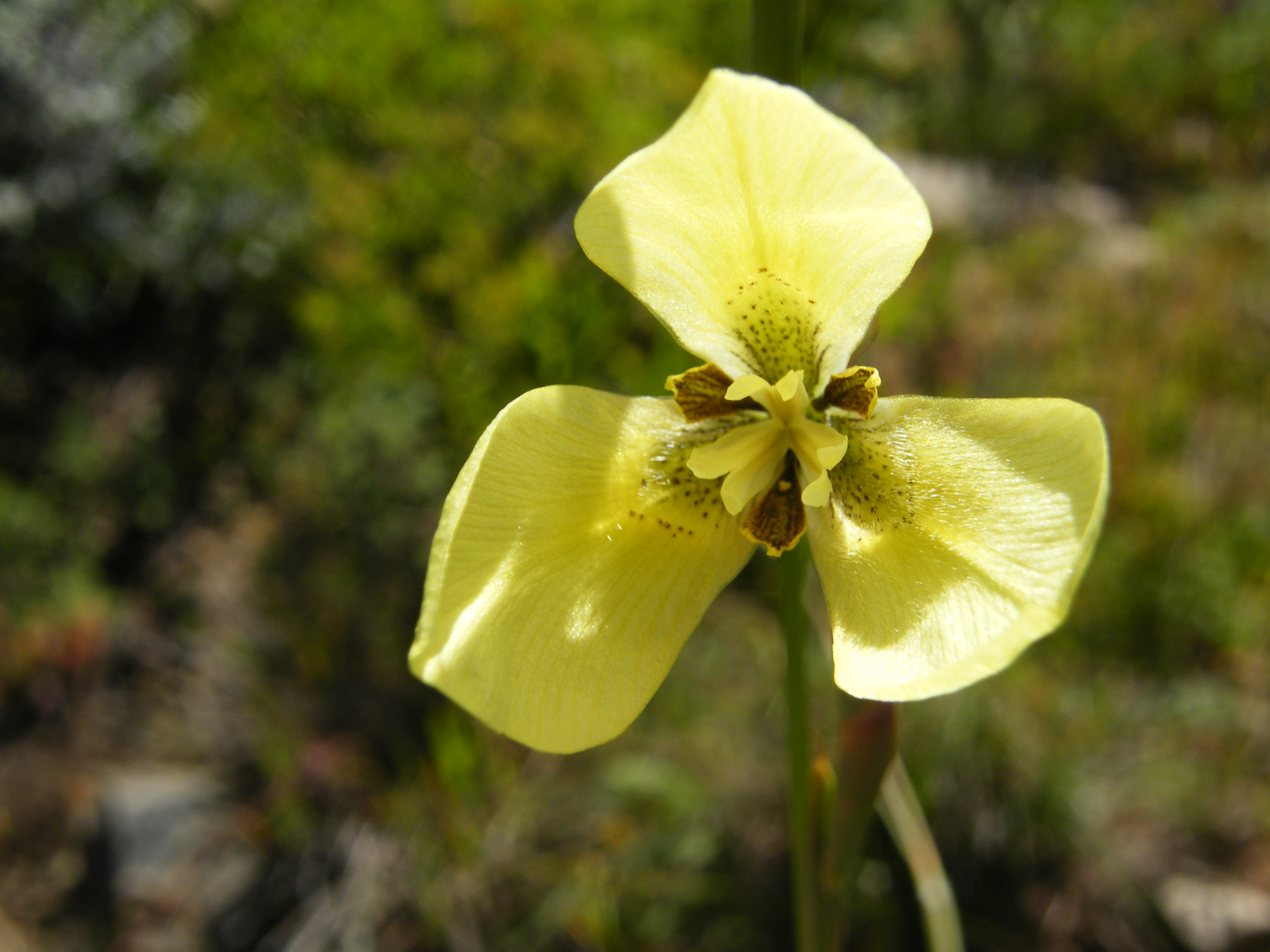

Scientific classification
- Kingdom: Plantae
- Clade: Tracheophytes
- Clade: Angiosperms
- Clade: Monocots
- Order: Asparagales
- Family: Iridaceae
- Genus: Moraea
- Species: M. bellendenii

Binomial name
- Moraea bellendenii (Sweet) N.E.Br.

Synonyms
- Vieusseuxia bellendenii Sweet

= Moraea bellendenii =

Species of flowering plant

Moraea bellendenii is a species of plant in genus Moraea that was named after John Bellenden, the English botanist.

It is common in the Western Cape on sandy slopes and flats, this yellow flowered cormous geophyte is usually 50 – 100 cm high, multi-branched, with a solitary leaf. The outer tepals of the flowers are 22 – 33 mm long and the inner tepals tricuspidate, 8 – 10 mm long. It flowers from October to November.

Its distribution ranges in the Western Cape from Darling in the west to Plettenberg Bay in the East. It is closely related to Moraea tricuspidata.

It was first described as Vieusseuxia bellendenii by Robert Sweet in 1826. In 1929 N. E. Brown revised the assessment of the species and authored it as "Morea Bellendeni" (now Moraea bellendenii).
