= Thomas Bellenden of Auchnoule =

Thomas Bellenden or Bannatyne of Auchnoule (c. 1485 – c. 1547), courtier of James V of Scotland, Judge from 1535, Director of Chancery from 1538, Lord Justice Clerk from 1539, member of the royal council, ambassador to England, and Protestant sympathizer. Bellenden was a graduate of the University of Paris, and early in his career used the title "Master."

== Interlude at Linlithgow and Reformation, 1540 ==
Bellenden's duties included meetings with English border officials. A letter written by the English deputy border warden William Eure to Thomas Cromwell on 26 January 1540 describes a meeting with Thomas Bellenden at Coldstream in January 1540. Eure said that Bellenden was over fifty years old. Bellenden described the performance of an interlude at Linlithgow Palace before James, his wife Mary of Guise and his bishops and council on the feast of the Epiphany. The play concerned the reformation of the church, and Eure obtained a more detailed description from a Scottish contact who saw the play at Linlithgow. This description corresponds with the expanded later text of David Lyndsay's play A Satire of the Three Estates.

Eure talked with Bellenden about the possibility of a Reformation of the 'spirituality' in Scotland. The play at Linlithgow had shown the 'naughtiness' of the church. Bellenden said that after the play the King spoke to the churchmen in the audience asking them to reform their factions and manner of living, otherwise he would send six of them into England to his uncle, Henry VIII. Bellenden said that James V intended to expel clergymen from royal appointments and he asked Eure to send him secretly copies of the English statutes that suppressed the Roman Catholic religion.

John Knox mentioned Thomas Bellenden positively in connection with the regrets of his predecessor as Justice Clerk, Thomas Scott of Pitgorno. Knox also wrote that Bellenden helped Regent Arran to power but his influence was lost when Arran abandoned the plan for Mary, Queen of Scots to marry Prince Edward of England.

Bellenden had family connections with the royal court and literature. At the end of his life he copied the Eneados, a translation of Virgil's Aeneid by Gavin Douglas into a manuscript now kept at Lambeth Palace. He co-signed the manuscript, "Heir ends the buke of Virgill written by the hand of Johanne Mudy with Mr Thomas Bellenden of Auchinnoull Just. Clerke and endit the 2 Febrii Annorum xlv."

== Ambassador to Henry VIII ==
Thomas Bellenden was in London in July 1541 discussing border affairs, Scottish merchants in England, and shipping incidents. He returned in October, described as 'director of Chancellary.' In 1543 he sent with Rothesay Herald an extract of the confessions of the murderers of the Somerset Herald Thomas Trahern to London.

== Family ==
Thomas was the son of Patrick Bellenden of Auchnoule or Auchnolyshill (d. 1514) and Mariota Douglas. Mariota was the nurse of James V and Patrick a servant of Margaret Tudor. They obtained the lands of Auchnoule from the Earl of Morton in 1499, which were located in the earl's barony of "Calder Cleir" now East Calder.

Thomas's sister Katherine Bellenden was also a courtier, connected with the royal wardrobe and worked with Janet Douglas, who was the wife of David Lindsay of the Mount, the diplomat, poet, and playwright. Katherine Bellenden was married to Adam Hopper, then Francis Bothwell, and thirdly to the royal favorite Oliver Sinclair. Thomas's brother John Bellenden was a poet and translator at court.

Thomas Bellenden married Agnes Forrester, their children included;

- John Bellenden of Auchnoule (d. 1576), Justice Clerk, married Margaret Scott.
- Patrick Bellenden of Stenhouse
- Katherine Bellenden, (d. 1578), who also worked in the royal wardrobe, married Robert or William Craig of Craigfintry and Craigston.
- Agnes Bellenden, married William Adamson.
- Alison Bellenden, married John Acheson.

One of his daughters was married in October 1564 and Mary, Queen of Scots and her four Maries attended the wedding.
