= John Bellenden =

Scottish writer

- Occupation: writer
- Years active: c. 1533–50

John Bellenden or Ballantyne (fl. 1533–1587?) was a Scottish writer of the 16th century and Archdeacon of Moray.

== Life ==
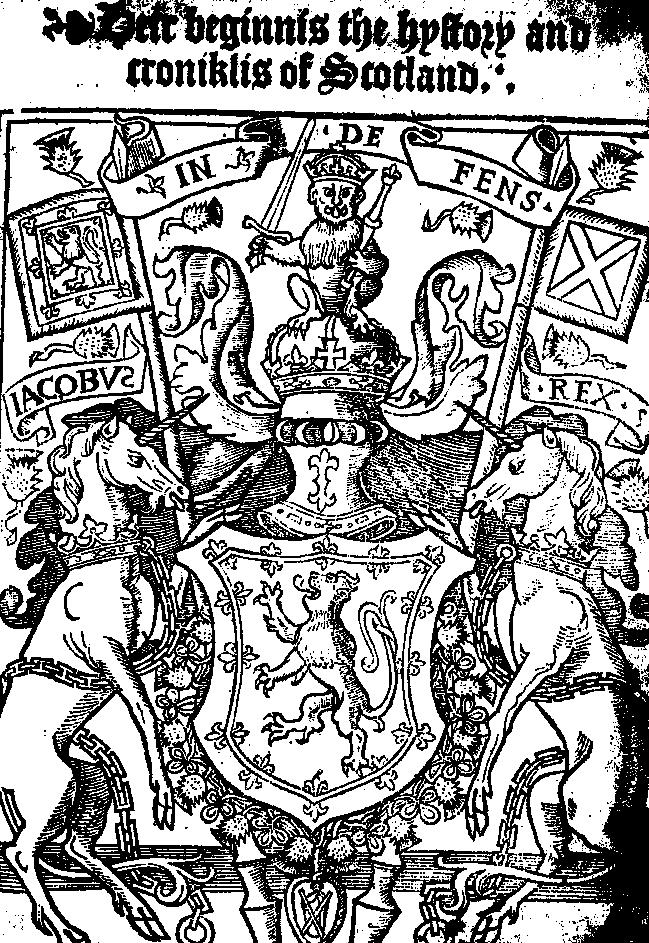
Title page of Bellenden's Croniklis printed in Edinburgh, with the heraldry of James V of Scotland

He was born towards the close of the 15th century, and educated at St. Andrews and Paris. At the request of James V he translated Hector Boece's Historia Gentis Scotorum. This translation, Croniklis of Scotland is a very free one, with a good deal of matter not in the original, so that it may be almost considered as a new work. It was published in 1536 in Edinburgh by Thomas Davidson. In 1533, Bellenden also translated the first five books of Livy's History of Rome. Bellenden approached Livy's text by consulting an older translation into French by Pierre Bersuire.

These works remain the earliest existing specimens of Scottish literary prose, and remarkable specimens they are, for the execution of which he enjoyed the Royal favour, and was made Archdeacon of Moray. Both the Croniklis and the Livy are prefaced by poems, the Proheme of the Chronicles, Quehen Silver Diane, being more often anthologised. Another work, the Banner of Piety, was prefaced by the poem Quhen goldin Phebus.

Bellenden latterly became involved in controversy which led to his being exiled to Rome, where he died, according to one account, about 1550. Another authority, however, states that he was still living in 1587.

== Family connections ==
John was the son of Patrick Bellenden of Auchnoule or Auchnolyshill (died 1514) and Mariota Douglas. Mariota was the nurse of James V. John's sister Katherine Bellenden was a courtier, connected with the royal wardrobe and worked with Janet Douglas, who was the wife of David Lyndsay of the Mount, the diplomat, poet, and playwright. Katherine Bellenden was married to Adam Hopper, then Francis Bothwell, and thirdly to the royal favorite Oliver Sinclair. John's older brother Thomas Bellenden of Auchnoule was a prominent lawyer and courtier.

== Post-mortem citations ==
Alan Balatine is a supposed historian mentioned by Edward Hall in the list of the English writers from whose works he compiled his Chronicle. The Oxford Dictionary of National Biography makes it clear that this person is very likely a misnomer for Bellenden, rather than a separate individual.

== Editions ==
- John Bellenden's translation of Boece's History of Scotland, vol.1, Tait, Edinburgh (1821), and volume 2, (1821).
- Modern English version of John Bellenden's translation of Boece's History of Scotland

== Sources ==
- Wood, James, ed. (1907). "B#Bellenden, John" . The Nuttall Encyclopædia. London and New York: Frederick Warne.
- see also sleuth hound
