= Adam Bothwell =

Scottish clergyman

Adam Bothwell, Lord of Session (c.1527, Edinburgh – 1593, Edinburgh), was a Scottish clergyman, judge, and politician.

== Overview ==
Adam Bothwell served as Bishop of Orkney (1559), Commendator of Holyrood Abbey (1570), Extraordinary Lord of Session (1563–4), and as an Ordinary Lord of Session (1565). He was also a Member of the Privy Council.

Bothwell was a Commissioner to the marriage of Mary, Queen of Scots with Francis, the Dauphin of France. In 1567, he conducted the marriage of Mary to the Earl of Bothwell (1567), and crowned the infant James VI. In 1568, he accompanied Regent Moray to the Conference of York and Westminster.

Bothwell converted to Protestantism at the Reformation. He was briefly imprisoned at Stirling Castle in 1578. He held charters of the baronies of Allhammer or Whitekirk in East Lothian (1587–8) and Brighouse in the Sheriffdom of Linlithgow (1592).

He is interred at Holyrood Abbey.

== Life ==
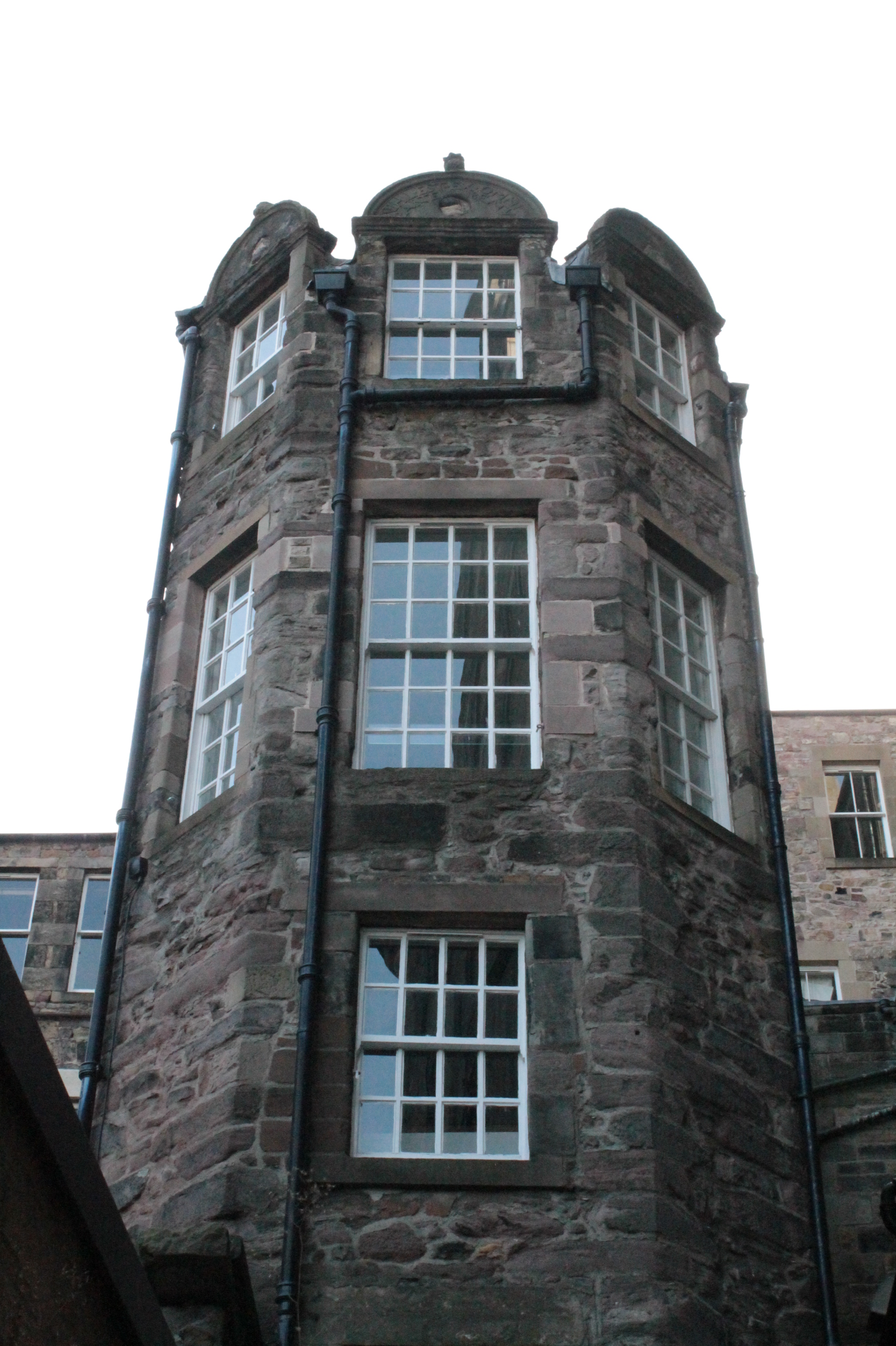
Adam Bothwell's House, north of the Royal Mile

Bothwell was the son of Francis Bothwell, a Lord of Session. His mother, according to some sources, was Francis' second wife Katherine Bellenden, although he could have been a son of Francis' first wife Janet Richardson. Adam Bothwell was born about 1527; his epitaph states that he died at the age of 67. If this date and age are correct he was not the son of Katherine: her first husband Adam Hoppar died in 1529.

He is said to have been versed both in canon and in civil law. The See of Orkney became vacant by the death of Robert Reid at Dieppe, 6 September 1558, on his way home after attending, as a commissioner, the marriage of Mary, Queen of Scots with Francis the Dauphin. On 11 (Grub) or 14 (Hew Scott) October 1559, Bothwell was put in possession of the temporalities of the vacant See.

He placed himself a few years later on the side of the Protestant party; but there is no reason to suppose that he had much interest in the reforming movement as such, or in the ministry for its own sake. His career is essentially that of one who trimmed his sails to suit the winds of fortune. He was not, however, a merely 'tulchan bishop.' He was duly elected by the new chapter of Orkney, constituted by charter on 28 October 1544 (confirmed 30 June 1545) through the wise exertions of his predecessor. Mary confirmed his appointment to the see on 8 October 1562. This of itself may be taken as proof that he was in Roman orders. He was probably consecrated, as he says that he was 'according to the order then observed, provided to the bishoprick of Orkney;' 1558, the date he gives, is possibly that of his election by the chapter.

On 14 January 1563, Bothwell was made an extraordinary Lord of Session; as he puts it, he was required by the Queen to accept the office; the instrument of his appointment contains, for the first time, the clause 'provided always ye find him able and qualified for administration of justice, conform to the acts and statutes of the college of justice.' He began, however, to take part in ecclesiastical affairs. We find him at both the half-yearly meetings of the general assembly in 1563 (opened 25 June at Perth, and Christmas Day at Edinburgh). At Perth he received a commission, for a year only, to plant within the bounds of his diocese kirks, etc.

At the Edinburgh meeting, memorable for the first communication (on a case of restitution of conjugal rights) addressed by the assembly to the English archbishops, Bothwell was made one of the commissioners for revising the Book of Discipline. He was not present at the meetings of assembly in 1564; at the December meeting (at which the use of the Book of Common Order was enjoined upon all ministers) 'it was demanded by some brethrein' whether the commissioner of Orkney (so he is called) 'might both duelie exerce the office of a superintendent and office of a Lord of the Colledge of Justice.' The decision was referred to 'the superintendent of the bounds where the questioun ariseth [i.e. the superintendent of Lothian], and a certane number of ministers within his bounds, as he sall choose to assist him.'

Apparently the decision was given in the affirmative, for on 13 November 1565 Bothwell was promoted to be an ordinary Lord of Session. At the June assembly in 1565, Bothwell was one of a committee to decide certain ecclesiastical questions. They decided inter alia that no minister should be a pluralist unless able personally to discharge the accumulated duties, and 'providing he be sufficiently answered of one stipend,' a rather ambiguous loophole. The same committee declined to order parish ministers to keep registers of deaths, on the ground that 'none or few of the ministrie had manses or gleebes for residence.'

At the December meeting Bothwell was not present. He attended both meetings of assembly in 1566; at the December meeting, which approved the Helvetic Confession, Bothwell was on a committee which decided that Protestant communicants who should become witnesses at the private celebration of baptism by a 'papisticall preest' should lie under church censure. He was also one of those appointed to revise the answer to Heinrich Bullinger, 'tuiching the apparell of preachers in England.' This appears to be Bothwell's last attendance as a member of the assembly. We next meet him on the occasion which alone is enough to make him a conspicuous person in history.

=== Wedding of Queen Mary and Bothwell ===
On 15 May 1567, Mary was married to James Hepburn, 4th Earl of Bothwell, who on 12 May had been created Duke of Orkney. The banns had been proclaimed, much against his will, by John Craig, minister of Edinburgh. The marriage was celebrated, after the Protestant form, by the Bishop of Orkney, in the council chamber at Holyrood Palace. David Calderwood says that 'the Bishop of Orkney, at the marriage, made a declaratioun of the Erle of Bothwell his repentance for his former offensive life; how he had joined himself to the Kirk, and embraced the reformed religioun;' he adds, 'but they were married the same day, in the morning, with a masse, as was reported by men of credite.' The authorities for this statement are Birrell's diary, which says that the marriage was performed by the Bishop of Orkney in the Chapel Royal; the journal called "Regent Moray's diary", which affirms that it was celebrated 'efter baith the sortis of the kirkis, reformit and unreformit;' and the representation of the confederate barons that it was 'accomplished in baith the fashions.'

Malcolm Laing, who discusses the point, considers that "the reformed bishop was not so scrupulous as to refuse to officiate privately in his former capacity," and argues that "the improbability that Mary would acquiesce in a protestant marriage is alone sufficient to refute the assertion" in the diary of Melville (who witnessed the Protestant marriage) that the ceremony was not performed in the chapel at the mass, as was the king's marriage. Burton, who speaks of the Bishop of Orkney as "a convert or an apostate, according to the estimate people formed of his sincerity," says nothing of a double marriage, rejects the account which places the ceremony in the Chapel Royal, and thinks "the probability lies with the other authorities" who describe it as taking place in the council chamber, "strictly in the protestant form."

=== Mary's abdication and James's coronation ===
Mary's abdication soon followed, on 24 July; and on the 29 July at Stirling, her son was crowned and anointed by the Bishop of Orkney. "Mr. Knox and other preachers", according to David Calderwood, "repyned at the ceremonie of anointing, yitt was he anointed." On 25 December, the general assembly delated in his absence "Adam, called bishop of Orkney," on four charges. He had not lately visited "the kirks of his countrie;" he "occupyed the rowme of a Judge in the Sessioun;" he "reteaned in his companie Francis Bothwell, a Papist, upon whom he had bestowed benefices;" and he had "solemnised the mariage betwixt the queene and the Erle of Bothwell." He appeared on the 30th; excused himself from residence in Orkney on account of the climate and his health; and denied that he knew F. Bothwell was a papist. For solemnising the royal marriage, "contrarie an act made against the mariage of the divorced adulterer," the assembly deprived him of all function in the ministry till such time as he should satisfy the assembly "for the slaunders committed by him." However, on 10 July 1568, the assembly restored him to the ministry, did not renew his commission to superintend the diocese of Orkney; but ordered him, as soon as his health permitted, to preach in the Chapel Royal ("kirk of Halyrudhous"), and after sermon confess his offence in the matter of the ill-fated marriage.

== Later years ==
Bothwell had probably had enough of his Orkney diocese, during one visit he was wrecked on a sandbank. In 1570, he exchanged the greater part of the temporalities of the See with Robert Stewart, natural brother to Queen Mary, for the abbacy of Holyrood House. He claimed in his defence to the assembly in March 1570, that "Lord Robert violentlie intruded himself on his whole living, with bloodshed, and hurt of his servants; and after he had craved justice, his and his servants' lives were sought in the verie eyes of justice in Edinburgh, and then was constrained, of meere necessitie, to tak the abbacie of Halyrudhous, by advice of sundrie godlie men". He still retained the title of the bishop of Orkney.

Bothwell was present at the election of John, Earl of Mar, as regent, by the parliament at Stirling, on 5 September 1571; and he was one of the commissioners appointed by the regent and privy council at the Leith convention, on 16 January 1572, to frame a revised ecclesiastical settlement. The result of their labours 'is remarkable,' says Grub, 'for its general resemblance to the external polity of the Church, as it existed before the Reformation in Scotland, and as it was at that time sanctioned by law in England.' In accordance with the new policy Bothwell was appointed on 3 November 1572 one of the consecrators of James Boyd as archbishop of Glasgow.

In 1578, shortly before the fall of Regent Morton (12 March), Bothwell was imprisoned in Stirling Castle, for protesting against that regent's measures. He was quickly liberated, and became one of the council of twelve who formed the provisional government, overthrown on 10 June. Four years passed, and in October 1582 the general assembly appointed Andrew Melville and Thomas Smeaton to confer with the bishop of Orkney on his having ceased from the exercise of the ministry. He pleaded age (he was about fifty-five), weakness of memory, and continual sickness; and alleged that his preferment was scarce worth 500 merks (under 28l. sterling) at his entry. The assembly evidently had their doubts about the case, for they directed the Edinburgh presbytery to try his ability, to appoint him to a particular flock, if he were fit for it, and 'to tak order with anie other complaints that should be givin in against him' before the next assembly. The next assembly appointed a fresh commission upon him; but, after the king's escape from the restraint which followed the Raid of Ruthven, the power of the assembly was abated, and the king protected the bishops.

Bothwell was one of the lords of the articles at the parliament in May 1584, the reactionary parliament which re-established episcopal rights 'flatt contrare the determinatioun of the kirk.' His later years seem to have been spent in quiet and comfort. By royal charter he received the baronies of Whitekirk (11 March 1587) and Brighouse (3 August 1592).

Adam Bothwell died 23 August 1593, and was buried near the high altar of the Chapel Royal in Holyrood Abbey. Appended to his epitaph, on a tablet fixed to the third south pillar from the east end, are some fulsome elegiacs, subscribed M. H. R. (Master Hercules Rollock).

He left a debt of £346 Scots for food provided to his house in Edinburgh. The bill included sweetmeats, sugars, olive oil, vinegar, and Scottish honey.

== Family ==
He married Margaret, daughter of John Murray of Touchadam, by whom he had:

1. John Bothwell, Lord Holyroodhouse, Lord of Session, commendator of Holyrood, advanced to the Peerage of Scotland, 20 December 1607, as Lord Holyroodhouse, the district belonging to the abbey being erected into a temporal lordship in his favour;
2. Francis Bothwell of Stewarton, Peeblesshire;
3. William Bothwell;
4. Jean Bothwell, who married Sir William Sandilands, of St Monans.

== Bothwell's houses ==
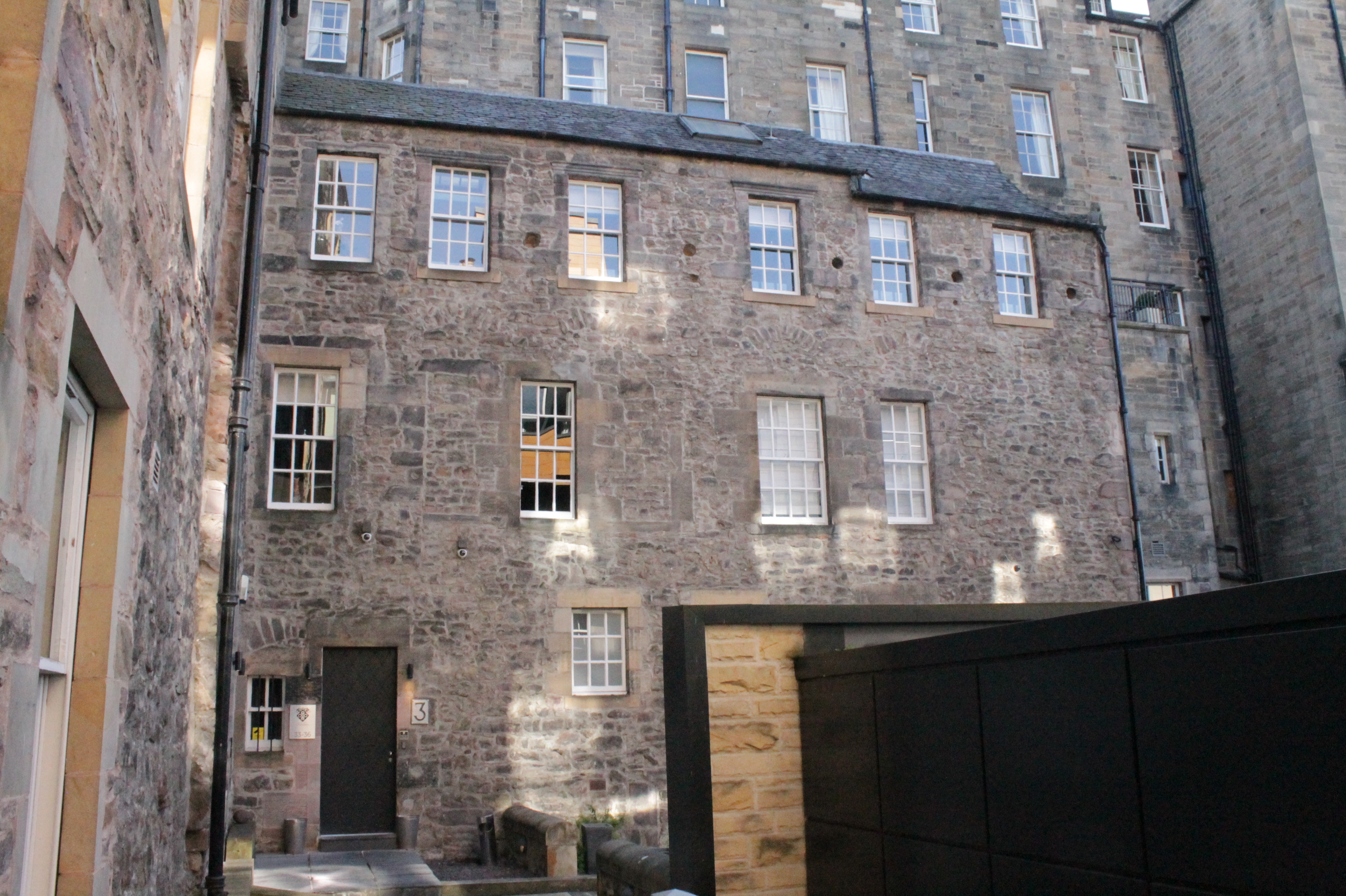
Bothwell's House as seen from Advocates Close

Adam Bothwell's house still exists, north of the Royal Mile in Edinburgh's Old Town, accessed from Advocates Close to its east. The property is a category A listed building.

Adam Bothwell had a house at Birsay in Orkney, which he called the "place of Birsay". In December 1560, it was taken and occupied by Henry Sinclair of Strom, an Orkney landowner and a son of Edward Sinclair, the Sheriff of Orkney. His main residence at Kirkwall was the Bishop's Palace, which he called "The Yards".
