= William Armstrong (Christie's Will) =

William Armstrong (1565–1649), known as Christie's Will, was a Scottish Borders freebooter of the 17th century, celebrated in a ballad by Sir Walter Scott.

== Biography ==
William Armstrong was the son of the Christie Armstrong referred to in the ballad of Johnnie Armstrong as "Kristy my son", and inherited Gilnockie Tower. Having been imprisoned in the Tolbooth, Jedburgh, for stealing two colts during a marauding expedition, he received his release through the interposition of the Earl of Traquair, lord high treasurer, and henceforth became devoted heart and soul to the earl's interests.

Some time afterwards a lawsuit, in which the Earl of Traquair was a party, was on for trial in the Court of Session, Edinburgh. The decision, it was supposed, would turn on the opinion of the presiding judge, Sir Alexander Gibson, Lord Durie I (who took the name as his judicial title when he bought the Durie land from the family of that name). He was known to be unfavourable to Lord Traquair. Armstrong, therefore, kidnapped the judge at Leith Sands, where he was taking his usual exercise on horseback, and conveyed him blindfold to an old castle, the tower of Graham, on the Dryfe Water, near Moffat. The judge's friends mourned for him as dead, the belief being that his horse had thrown him into the sea; but after the case was settled he was again conveyed blindfold to Leith Sands, whence he made his way home three months later than his horse. As Lord Durie was twice chosen president of the court, namely, for the summer session of 1642, and for the winter session of 1643, his capture must have taken place in one of these years.

Armstrong is said also to have been employed by Traquair, during the Wars of the Three Kingdoms, in conveying a packet to the king, and on his return to have made his escape at Carlisle from the pursuit of Cromwell's soldiers by springing his horse over the parapet of the bridge that crosses the Eden, which was then in flood. It is not impossible that the tombstone discovered in the churchyard of Sark, supposed at one time to be that of "Kinmont Willie", may really commemorate Christie's Will. The William Armstrong to whom it refers died in 1658 at the age of 56.

== In literature ==
The ballad of Christie's Will, published by Sir Walter Scott in Minstrelsy of the Scottish Border is, according to Scott, not to be regarded as of genuine and unmixed antiquity.

== Notes ==
Attribution

- This article incorporates text from a publication now in the public domain: Henderson, Thomas Finlayson (1885). "Armstrong, William (1602?-1658?)". In Stephen, Leslie (ed.). Dictionary of National Biography. Vol. 2. London: Smith, Elder & Co. pp. 102–103.
