= Thomas Craig (jurist) =

Scottish jurist and poet

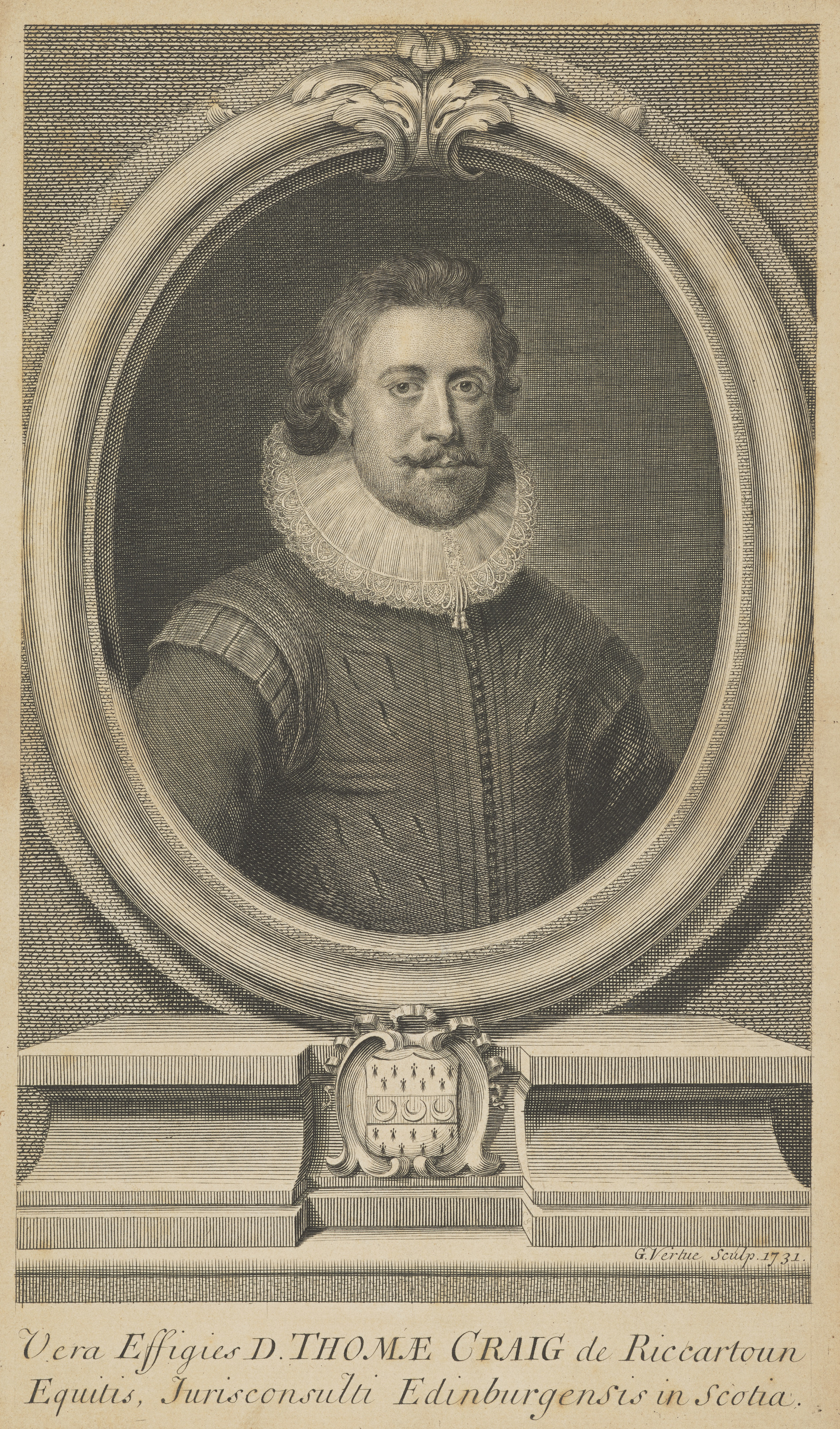
Thomas Craig

Sir Thomas Craig of Riccarton (c. 1538 – 26 February 1608) was a Scottish jurist and poet.

== Biography ==
His father was Robert Craig, an Edinburgh merchant, who was born in 1515 and died in 1575. He married Katherine Bellenden who was born in 1520, she died in 1575. Robert Craig sold texiles and his customers included Regent Arran and Mary of Guise. Robert Craig's uncle was the Scottish reformer and John Knox's colleague John Craig.

In Edinburgh he lived on the lower half of Warriston Close off the north side of the Royal Mile. His rural residence, as his title implies, was Riccarton House, a few miles west of Edinburgh.

Craig was educated at the Royal High School, Edinburgh, and then studied at St Leonard's College at the University of St Andrews, where he took the Bachelor of Arts degree in 1555. From St. Andrews he went to France, to study canon law and civil law. In Paris from 1555 to 1561, he studied civil law under François Baudouin. His work on feudal law shows the influence of François Hotman, which must be later.

Craig returned to the Kingdom of Scotland about 1561, and was admitted advocate in February 1563. In 1564, he was appointed justice-depute by the justice-general, Archibald Campbell, 5th Earl of Argyll; and in this capacity he presided at many of the criminal trials of the period in Edinburgh, and in 1606 was made procurator for the church. He never became a lord of session, a circumstance that was unquestionably due to his own choice.

He is said to have refused the honour of knighthood which James VI conferred on him in 1604, but in accordance with James's command was styled and reputed a knight. Craig had come to London as one of the Scottish commissioners regarding the administrative union between the Kingdom of Scotland and the Kingdom of England, the only political object he seems to have cared about. He wrote that the conduct of the 1604 commission was amicable.

Like his brother, John Craig, Thomas took an interest in astronomy and corresponded with Tycho Brahe.

He died in Edinburgh on 26 February 1608.

== Works ==
Except his poems, the only one of Craig's works which appeared during his lifetime was his Jus feudale (1603). This book was the first comprehensive legal treatise to be written in Scotland and its objective was to assimilate the laws of England and Scotland, but instead of this, it was an important factor in building up and solidifying the law of Scotland into a separate system.

In his The Right of Succession (1602), Craig claimed that although Mary, Queen of Scots, had not been given an education in law, her judgement often exceeded the "ablest lawyers". This was intended to please James VI. He praised Elizabeth I for her learning and success. His 1604 De unione regnorum Britanniae tractatus, or A Treatise of the Union of Kingdoms of Britain proposed the closer union of England and Scotland following the 1603 Union of the Crowns. Rather than sweeping reforms to make the governance of the two realms equivalent, Craig advocated gradual changes based on common principles. Craig included an anecdote that some English people denied that previous English kings had ever tried to conquer Scotland, as the country was of little worth.

Editions of his works include:

- Jus feudale (1603). Republished by Robert Burnet (Edinburgh, 1655), Lüder Mencke (Leipzig, 1716) and James Baillie (Edinburgh, 1732). An English translation by Lord Clyde was published in 1934. In 2017, the Stair Society published the first volume of a new four part Latin edition of Jus Feudale with facing English translation by classicist and law professor Leslie Dodd. This was followed in 2025 by the second volume, covering the first half of Book 2.
- De unione regnorum Britanniae tractatus (1604), English translation (1910) by Charles Sanford Terry;
- De jure successionis regni Angliae, written to answer Robert Parsons, and translated as Concerning the Right of Succession to the Kingdom of England by James Gadderar;
- De hominio disputatio. This was translated by George Ridpath as Scotland's Sovereignty asserted; being a dispute concerning Homage (1695).

Craig's first poem, an epithalamium in honour of the wedding of Mary, Queen of Scots, and Henry, Lord Darnley, appeared in 1565. Most of his poems have been reprinted in the Delitiae poetarum Scotorum.

== Family ==
Craig was the brother of John Craig. Craig had numerous family connections, and was married twice. His first wife Helen Hamilton of 1573, who died in 1575, was the niece or granddaughter of Robert Richardson. His second wife of 1578 was Helen, daughter of Robert Heriot of Lumphoy in Currie parish, Midlothian, an Advocate, by whom he had four sons and three daughters; she was also the step-daughter of Edward Henryson, another Advocate, her mother Helen Swinton's second husband.

- His eldest son, Lewis Craig (1569–1622) was raised to the bench in 1604.
- His second son James was born in 1573, he was killed in Ireland in 1641 while defending the castle at Croghan against rebels. He firstly married Margaret Gibson who was born around 1580, they had one known child:

John Craig, who married Isabel Gouldie who was born in 1612, she died in 1645. He divorced from Margaret Gibson. He secondly married Margaret Peter who was born in 1589.

- His third son John Craig was a royal physician who died in 1655; another royal physician John Craig was his uncle and brother of Thomas Craig.
- His eldest daughter Margaret married Alexander Gibson, Lord Durie I, and was mother of Alexander Gibson, Lord Durie II.
- The second daughter Elizabeth became the wife of James Johnston, and was mother of Archibald Johnston, Lord Warriston, and Rachel Johnston, who married Robert Burnet, Lord Crimond.
- His third daughter Janet m. John Belches of Tofts, of the Belches of Invermay. They were parents to Alexander Belsches, Lord Tofts.
