= Alexander Gibson, Lord Durie =

Scottish judge and legal writer

Alexander Gibson, Lord Durie I (c.1570–1644) was a Scottish judge and legal author.

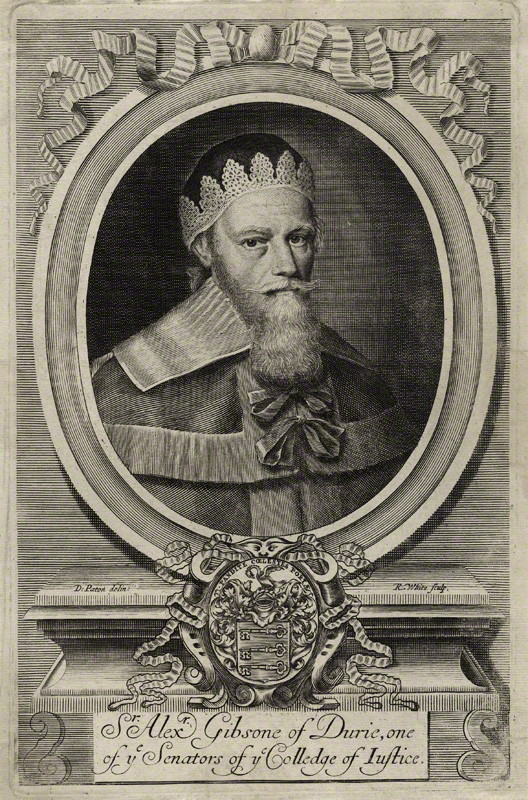
Alexander Gibson, Lord Durie I

== Life ==
He was son of George Gibson of Goldingstones, a clerk of session, and his wife Mary Airth, of the family of Airth of that ilk in Stirlingshire; William Gibson the lord of session was brother to his great-grandfather George Gibson. Alexander studied Law and graduated M.A. at the University of Edinburgh in August 1588. On 14 December 1594 he was admitted third Clerk of Session.

On 10 July 1621 Gibson was appointed a lord of session, and Senator of the College of Justice and took the title of "Lord Durie", his position as clerk of session being then conferred upon his son Alexander, to be held jointly with himself. Sir Robert Douglas, 6th Baronet stated that Gibson was created a baronet of Nova Scotia in 1628, but he does not appear to have used the title.

In 1633 Gibson was named a commissioner for reviewing the laws and collecting the local customs of the country. In 1640 he was elected a member of the committee of estates, and on 13 November 1641 his appointment as judge was continued under a new commission to the court. While the office of president of the College of Justice continued elective, Durie was twice chosen head of the court: for the summer session on 1 June 1642, and for the winter session of 1643. He died at his home of Durie House on 10 June 1644. Durie Castle, the family house near Leven, Fife, was burnt down in 1641 and replaced soon after by Durie House.

William Forbes, in the preface to his Journal of the Session (1714), praised Durie as "a man of a penetrating wit and clear judgment, polished and improved by much study and exercise".

His Edinburgh mansion lay on the Royal Mile between Borthwicks Close and Old Assembly Close. The house was destroyed in the Great Fire of Edinburgh of 1824.

== Works ==
From 11 July 1621, the day after his elevation to the bench, to 16 July 1642, Gibson preserved notes of decisions. They are the earliest digested collection of decisions in Scottish law, and are often referred to as "Lord Durie's Practicks". They were published by his grandson Sir Alexander Gibson, as Decisions of the Lords of Council and Session, Edinburgh, 1690.

== Family ==
On 14 January 1596 he married Margaret Craig, the eldest daughter of Sir Thomas Craig of Riccarton, with whom he had three sons: Alexander Gibson II of Durie (d. 1656); Sir John Gibson of Pentland; and George Gibson of Balhousie, and a daughter, Margaret Gibson, who married Thomas Fotheringham of Powrie.

== In literature ==
There is a story of Gibson being kidnapped by the Earl of Traquair, who thought him unfavourable in a cause before the court, and kept him for three months in a dark room in the country. After the case was decided, he was returned to the place where he had been seized. It forms the subject of Walter Scott's ballad of Christie's Will (see William Armstrong) in Minstrelsy of the Scottish Border. Patrick Fraser Tytler, in the appendix to his Life of Sir Thomas Craig, mentioned another version of the kidnapping of Durie in 1604, when he was a clerk of session. Tytler considered that this was a different incident.

== Notes ==
Attribution

This article incorporates text from a publication now in the public domain: Stephen, Leslie, ed. (1890). "Gibson, Alexander (d.1644)". Dictionary of National Biography. Vol. 21. London: Smith, Elder & Co.
