= James Hamilton (assassin) =

Scottish assassin

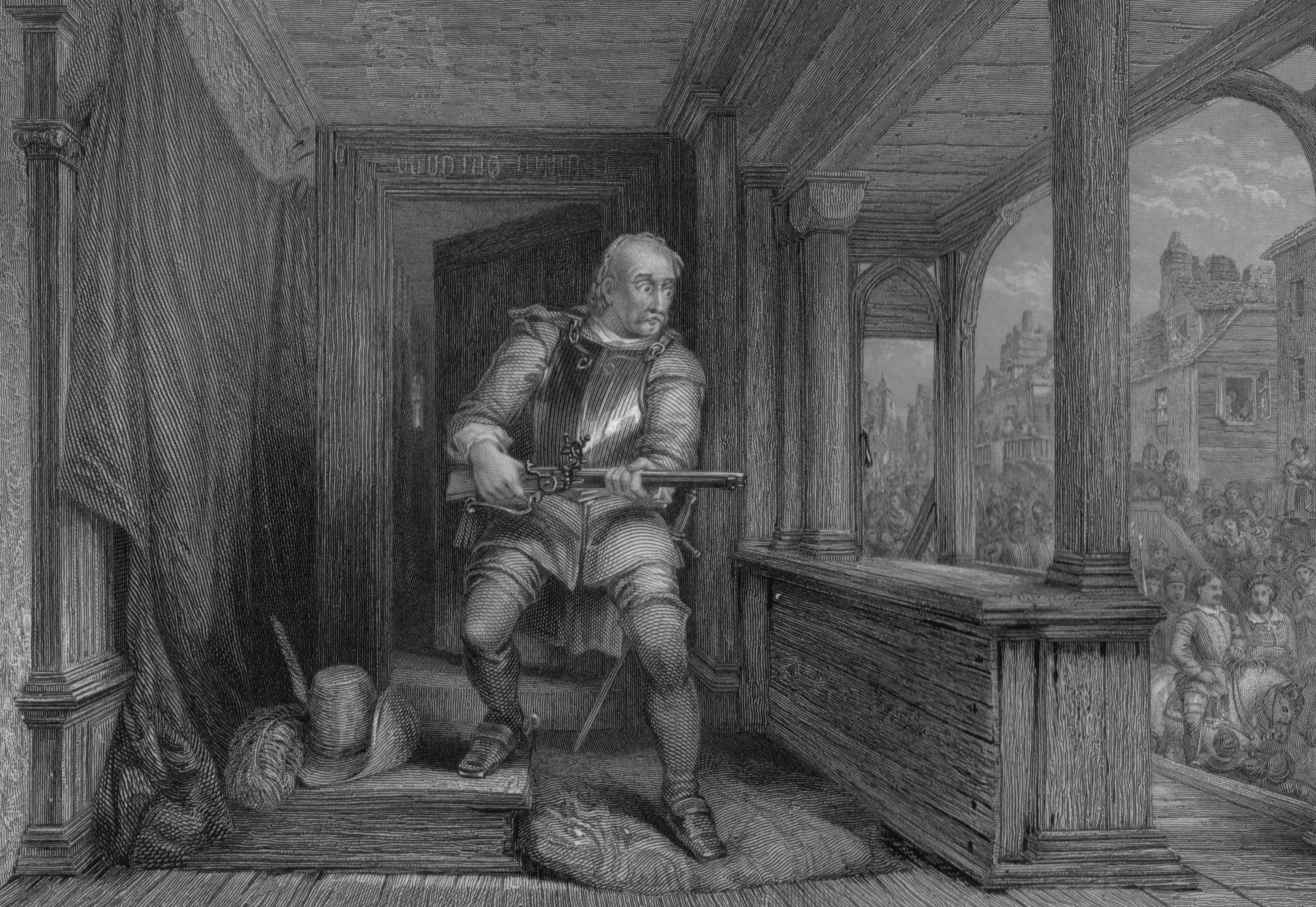
- James Hamilton preparing to assassinate the Regent Moray (1835 illustration after George Cattermole)
- Died: 1581
- Family: Clan Hamilton

James Hamilton of Bothwellhaugh and Woodhouselee (died 1581) was a Scottish supporter of Mary, Queen of Scots, who assassinated James Stewart, 1st Earl of Moray, Regent of Scotland, in January 1570. He shot Moray from the steps of his uncle Archbishop John Hamilton's house in Linlithgow.

== Family ==
James Hamilton was a member of Hamilton family from Bothwellhaugh, a village and castle in the Clyde Valley. His father was David Hamilton of Bothwellhaugh and his mother Christian Shaw. The lands of Bothwellhaugh are still the property of the Dukes of Hamilton, but the village no longer exists.

James's mother and two brothers, Arthur, later called "of Bothwellhaugh", and James, Provost of Bothwell were also accused of the assassination. Another younger brother was David Hamilton of Monktonmains, later "of Bothwellhaugh". David was said to have been present at the death of Regent Lennox in 1571.

James Hamilton married Isobel Sinclair, the daughter of Oliver Sinclair and Katherine Bellenden, and the joint-heiress of Woodhouselee, a castle in Midlothian, a quarter-mile (400 m) northwest of Easter Howgate and 2 1/2 miles (4.0 km) north of Penicuik in the valley of the River Esk. They had a son David and daughter Alison Hamilton. The other heiress of Woodhouselee, Alison Sinclair, married James's brother David.

== Background to the assassination ==
James Hamilton, like most of the Hamilton family, supported Mary Queen of Scots, and fought for her against Regent Moray at the battle of Langside. Though captured, his life was spared. The seventeenth-century historian David Calderwood noted that John Knox obtained James's release. Queen Mary was forced into exile and captivity in England, while Moray, her half-brother, ruled in Scotland on behalf of her son James VI of Scotland, and began to pacify resistance loyal to Mary. The Hamiltons remained supporters of Mary.

There is a traditional story (now perhaps discredited as a fictionalised account by Sir Walter Scott) that James was an especial enemy of the Regent's party because his wife and child were evicted from Woodhouselee. According to the story, Woodhouselee was given to Sir James Ballenden by James Hamilton in order to secure his freedom after Langside. Bellenden took possession of the property in the middle of the night, throwing James Hamilton's wife and newborn child out into the bitter cold in just their night clothes. The ghosts of his tragic wife and child are said to still haunt the site of the old castle and her frenzied and terrifying screams have been heard by those dwelling nearby.

After the assassination, the lands of Woodhouslee were given to the Bellenden family for forty years. The story that James Hamilton gave Woodhouselee to James Bellenden after Langside, but not the eviction of his wife, first appeared in John Spottiswoode's History.

A contemporary polemic writer Adam Blackwood told a different and simpler version of the story, stating that Regent Moray came to Bothwellhaugh in person to burn the house of Bothwellhaugh in revenge after Langside, and ignored the pleading of Hamilton, his wife, and sister-in-law.

However, the main motive for the assassination was rooted in the political rivalries in Scotland at the time, and James Hamilton's uncle, John Hamilton, Archbishop of St. Andrews, at least had prior knowledge of the plot (It has been suggested that the Archbishop and James's mother Christian Shaw may have been born to the same mother, or that "uncle" was merely a courtesy title).

Shortly after Moray's assassination, his secretary Master John Wood was also murdered, which second killing has been taken by commentators since the contemporary George Buchanan to support the interpretation that this was a political crime and not a personal feud.

== Assassination ==
=== Preparation ===
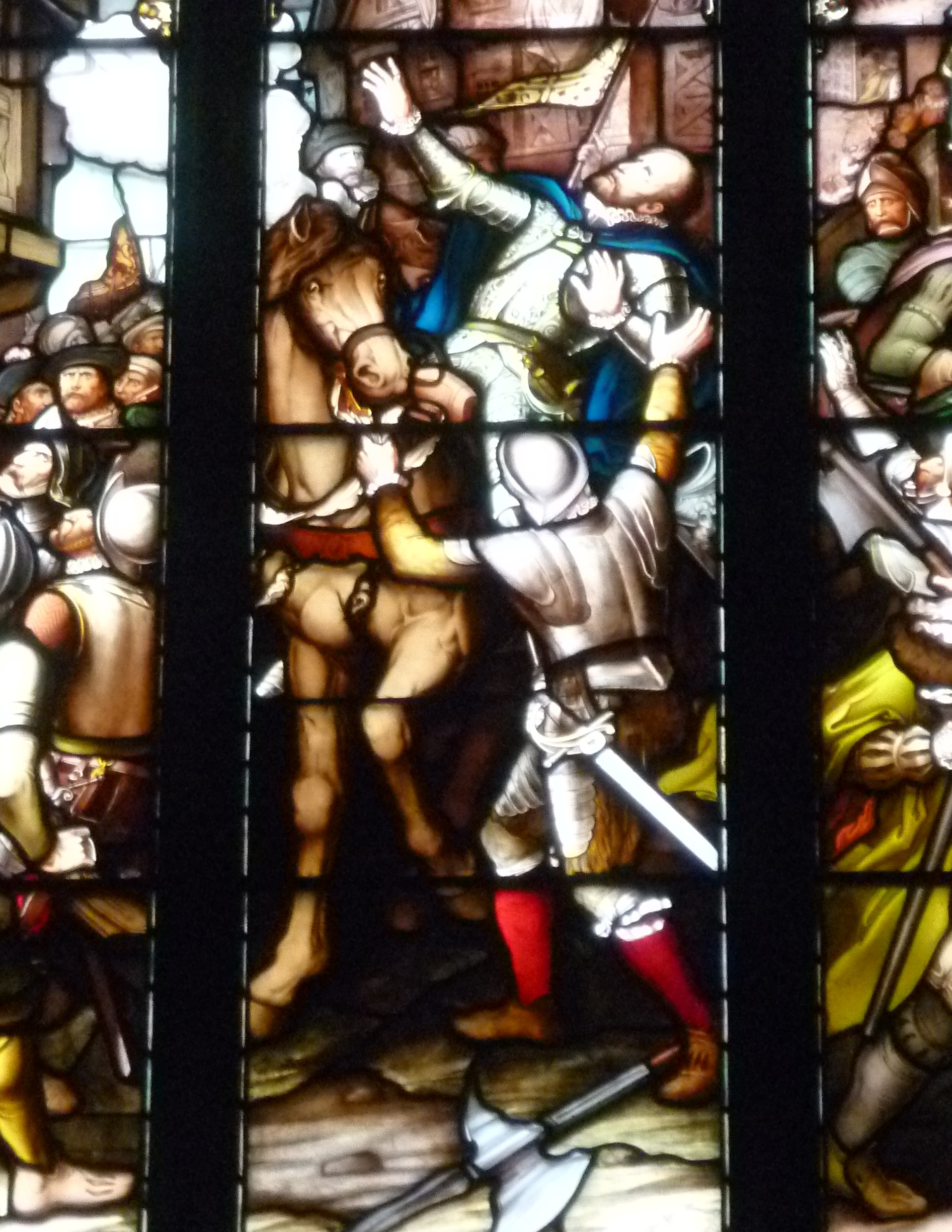
Detail from a stained glass window depicting the assassination

Moray had been appointed Regent of Scotland after his half-sister Mary abdicated in 1567, and had subsequently clashed with her and her supporters. He burnt down Rutherglen Castle in 1569 in retaliation against the Hamiltons for supporting Mary. James Hamilton decided to assassinate Moray and travelled to the Borders, Edinburgh, York, London, Perth, Glasgow and Stirling without an opportunity arising. Finally Moray went from Stirling to Linlithgow, where he stopped at the house of the Provost, Charles Drummond, the brother of Sir Robert Drummond of Carnock.

When Moray left the house to go to Edinburgh, the chance for revenge presented itself. Hamilton, who had six accomplices drawn from his close family, prepared the assassination carefully, gaining access to a Hamilton family property which had a projecting gallery. John Knox told his secretary, Richard Bannatyne of the danger in Linlithgow, and Bannatyne warned Regents Moray's wife, Agnes Keith. She sent Moray's secretary Master John Wood to alert her husband. Knox's source had told him that the attempt would be on the High Street, near the cross, and an alternative route to avoid the Archbishop's house was suggested in vain.

The details of Hamilton's preparations were conjectured in a fictionalised account by Leitch Ritchie. In Ritchie's story, James placed feathers on the ground to deaden his footsteps, hanging a black cloth on the wall to hide his shadow and obtaining a brass match-lock carbine with a rifled barrel for accuracy. The weapon was long preserved at Hamilton Palace. All entrances were either barricaded or stuffed with spiny gorse, and as contemporary sources relate, he had a saddled horse waiting.

=== Execution ===
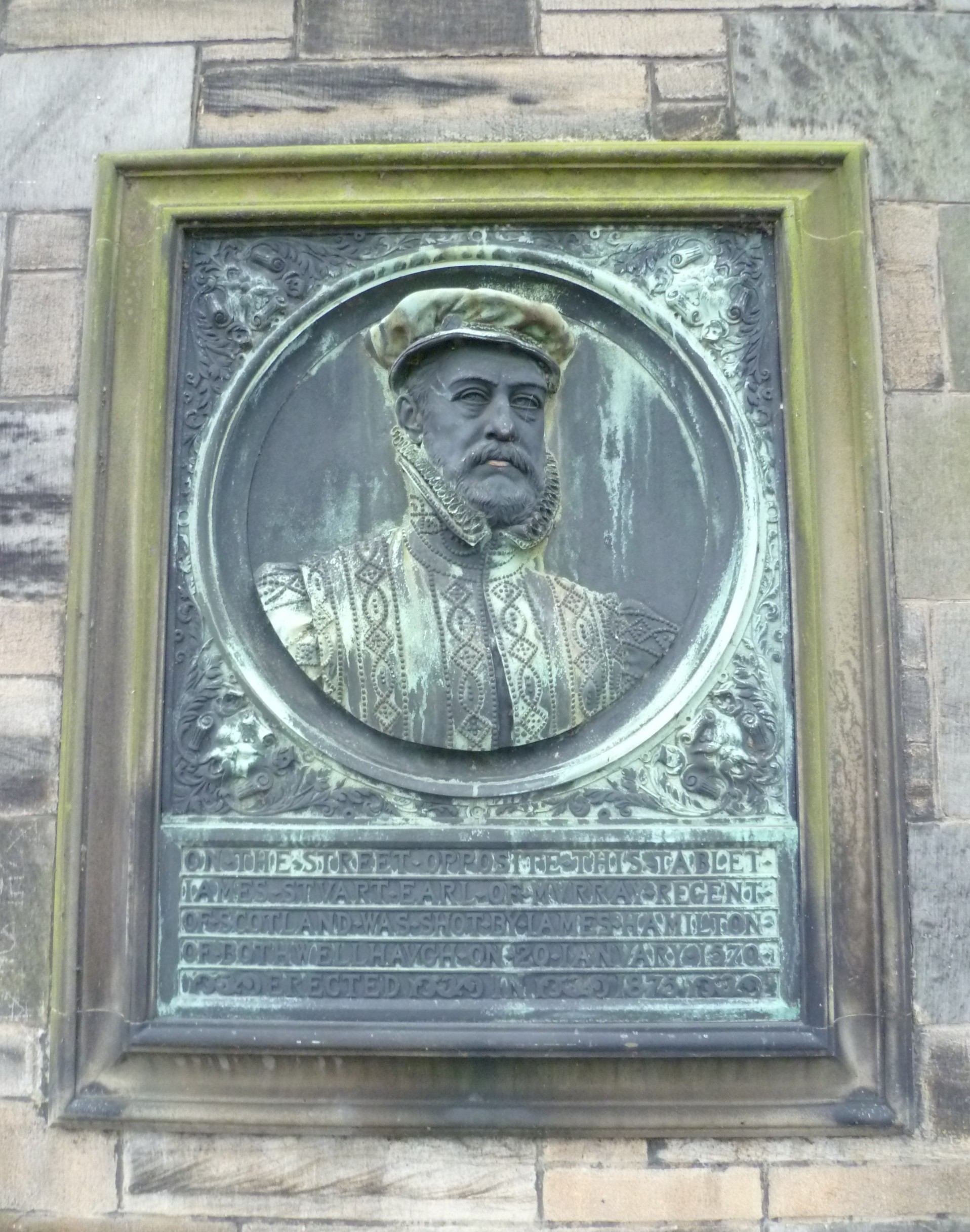
Regent Moray plaque close to the assassination spot

On 23 January 1570 James Hamilton fired at the Regent from a window, behind some washing, and mortally wounded him. He is the subject of a painting by George Cattermole, showing him about to assassinate the regent. The weapon illustrated is however a fire-lock and therefore not the type of weapon used. The incident is also depicted on stained glass in St. Giles' Cathedral in Edinburgh.

After a desperate ride, closely pursued by the Regent's men, James made it to the safety of his triumphant kin in Hamilton. According to Moray's contemporary George Buchanan, the getaway horse was provided by Lord John Hamilton, Abbot of Arbroath. Buchanan wrote that the fatal shot also killed the horse of one of Moray's companions. Regent Moray dismounted, wounded below his navel, walked to his lodging and died the same day, according to the Diurnal of Occurrents at Linlithgow Palace in the hour before midnight.

The incident was described in the contemporary diary of Robert Birrel;

The Earl of Moray, the Good Regent, was slain in Linlithgow by James Hamilton of Bothwell-haugh, who shot the said Regent with a gun out at ane window, and presently thereafter fled out at the back, and leapt on a very good horse, which the Hamiltons had ready waiting for him; and, being followed speedily, after that spur and wand had failed him, he drew forth his dagger, and struck his horse behind; whilk causit the horse to leap a very broad stank; by whilk means he escaped.

The 17th-century historian David Calderwood described the shot in more detail; "with a hacquebut, through a tirleis window (shuttered), from a stair whereupon were hunge sheets to drie, but in truthe, to hide the smooke, and make the place the lesse suspected".

The subject, specifically the moment when Hamilton is about to shoot, evidently fascinated the English painter George Cattermole, who returned to it in several different compositions, in the 1830s and 1840s.

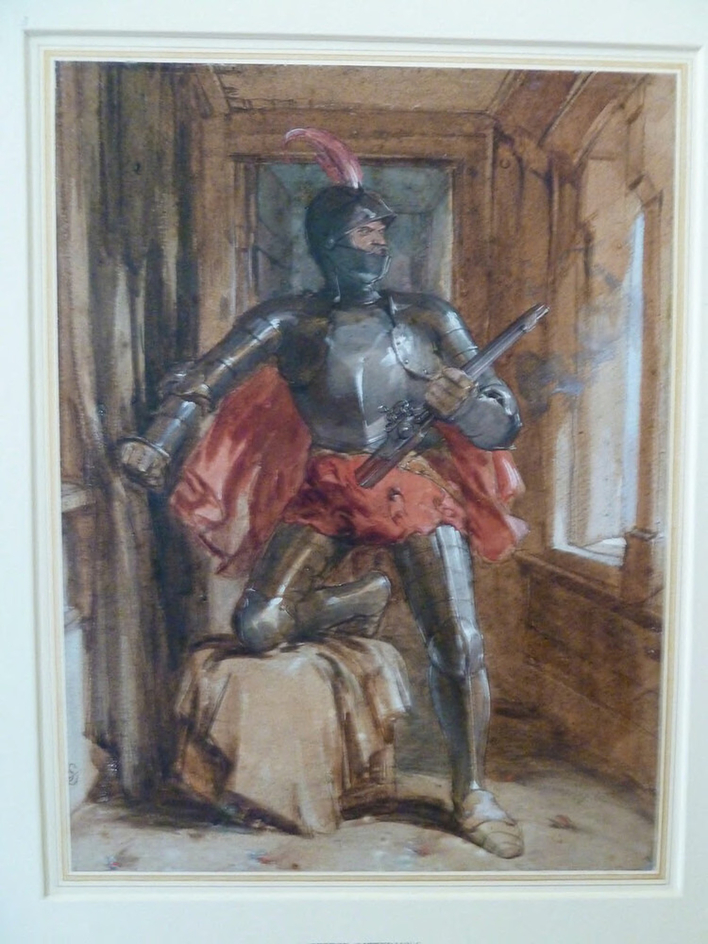
Watercolour, 1833, Ashmolean Museum

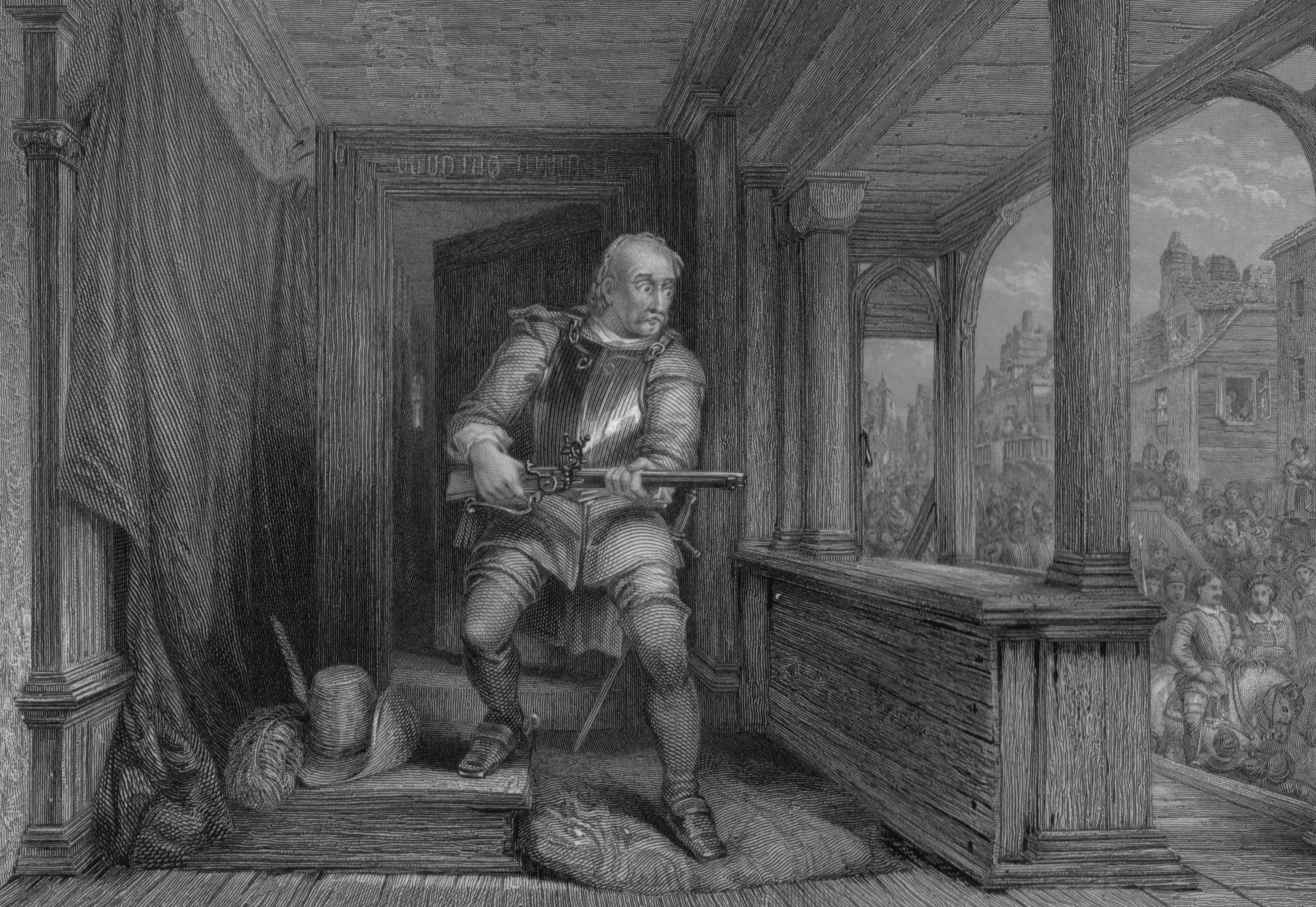
Book illustration, 1835.

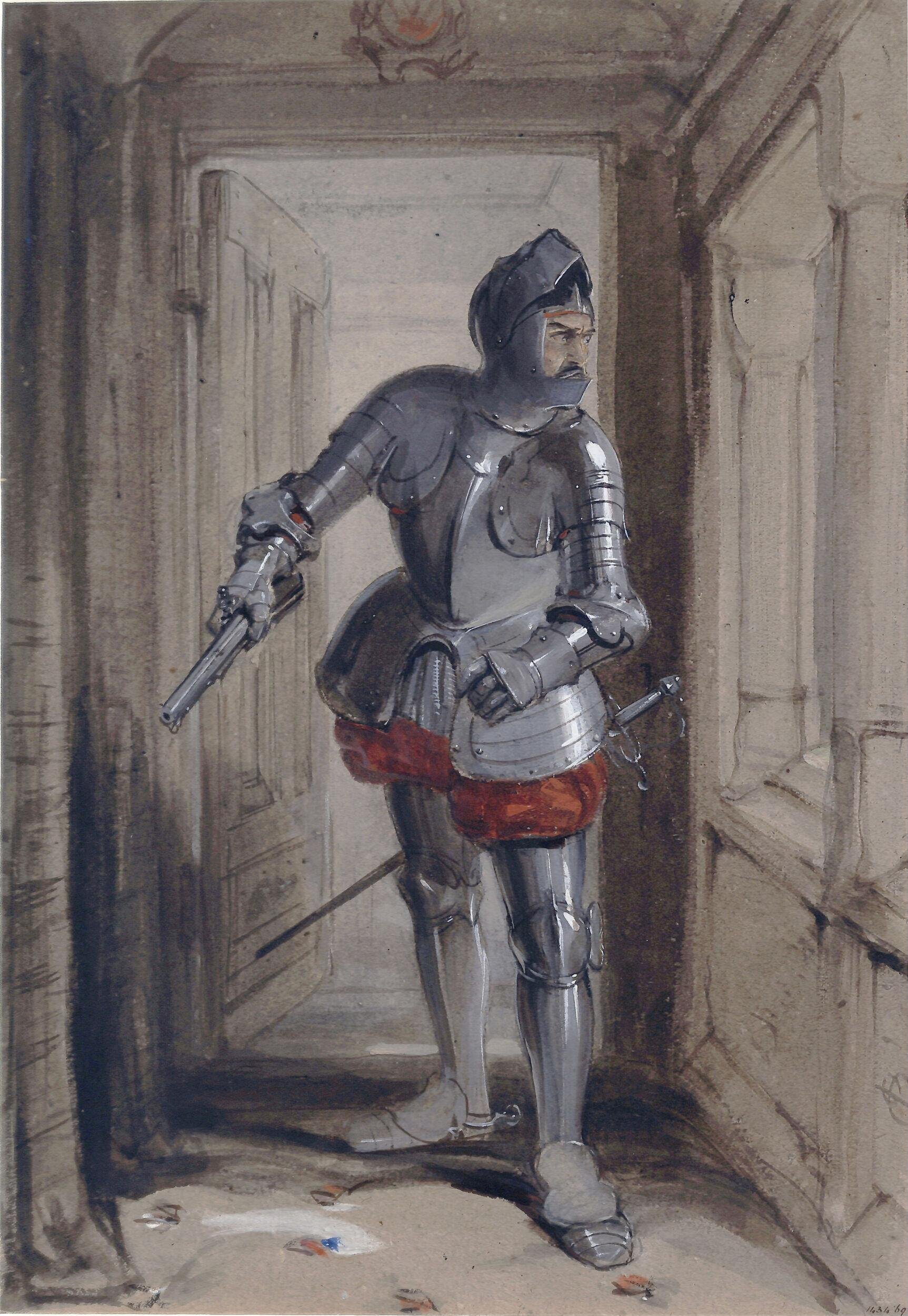
V&A

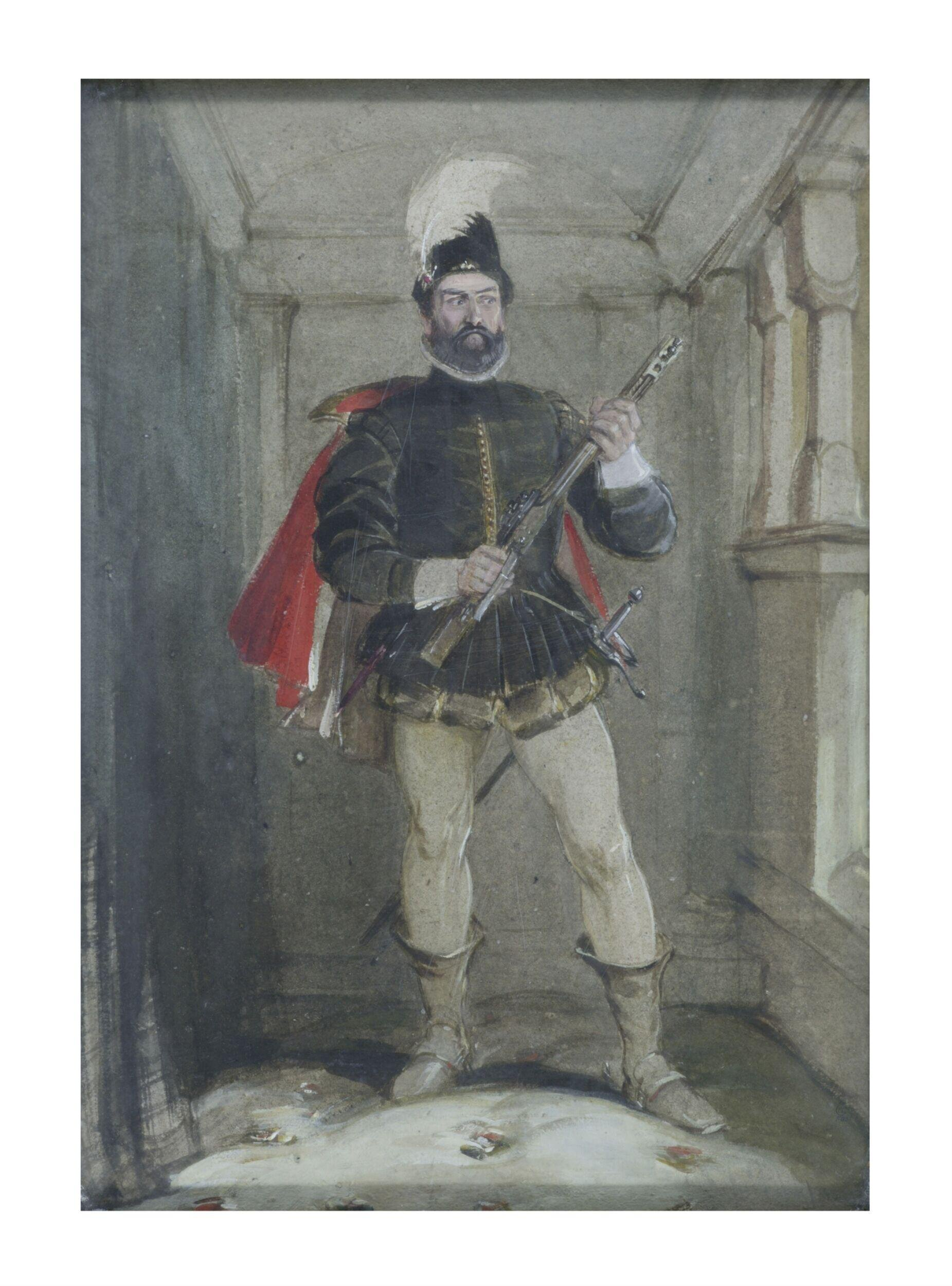
V&A

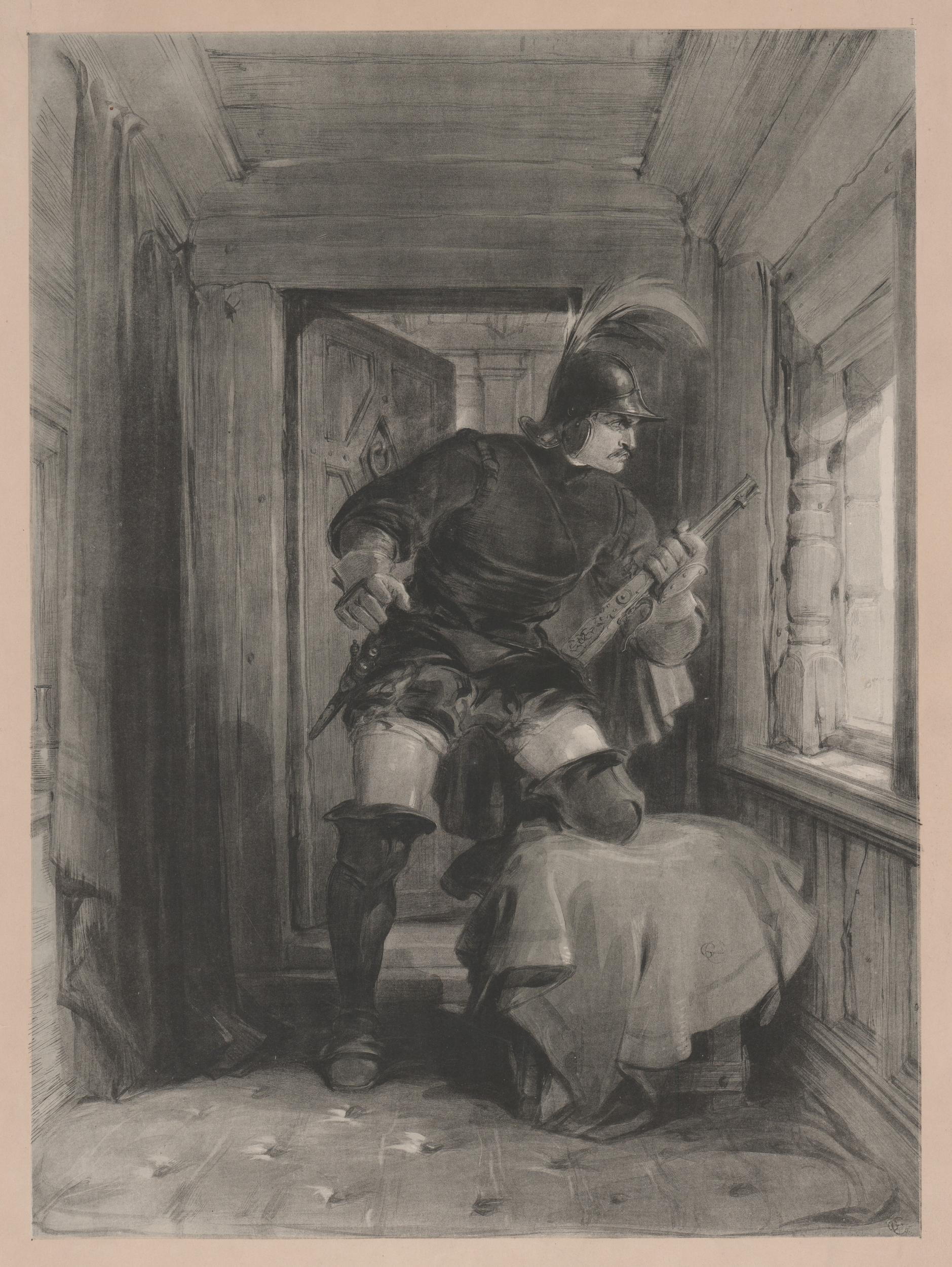
Lithograph, 1848

=== Bothwellhaugh Carbine ===
James Hamilton used a carbine of 3 feet 5 inches (104 cm) length and a hexagonal bore barrel of 2 feet 5 inches (74 cm) length. The stock was inlaid with a deer feeding and at the butt had the usual covered container for storing bullets.

The owner in 1890 was Lord Hamilton of Dalzell, who wrote, "Hamilton of Bothwellhaugh was a nephew of Hamilton of Orbiston, and occupied Bothwellhaugh, a farm on the estate of Orbiston. The gun remained in the possession of the Orbiston family until my grandfather, General Hamilton of Orbiston and Dalzell, sold the estate of Bothwellhaugh sixty years ago to the then Duke of Hamilton, when he made a present of this carbine. At the sale of the Hamilton collection in 1882, the present Duke of Hamilton gave it back to me." The gun was exhibited at Glasgow in 1888. The butt carried an oval brass plate inscribed: "Bothwellhaughes Gun with which he Shot Regent Murray upon the 23d January 1570".

== Aftermath ==
=== Burial and civil war ===
News of the shooting quickly reached England. By 26 January, the Marshall of Berwick, William Drury, who had met with Moray at Stirling Castle on 19 January, knew that the Regent was dead, Bothwellhaugh had escaped, the Archbishop's house at Linlithgow had been burnt, and that the assassin's gun, which he called a 'caliver', belonged to Lord John Hamilton, Abbot of Arbroath. By 29 January news of the shooting, but not Moray's death, reached Elizabeth I of England in London. According to David Calderwood, the next night after Moray's death, Walter Scott of Buccleuch and Thomas Ker of Ferniehirst raided the English border deliberately to help the conspiracy.

The Regent's body was first taken to the Chapel Royal in Stirling Castle, then shipped down the River Forth to Leith and taken to Holyroodhouse. Moray was buried at St Giles Kirk in Edinburgh, his body carried by six earls and lords and his standard of the Red Lion of Scotland by William Kirkcaldy of Grange. John Knox had prohibited funeral sermons on the grounds that they glorified the deceased and displayed distinctions between rich and poor, however the ban was lifted on this occasion. His wife commissioned a handsome stone monument for the earl (however the one present today is a replica put up in 1864) together with a stained glass window illustrating the assassination scene, by the 12th Earl of Moray.

There were calls for the chiefs of the Hamilton family to be arrested, notably from William Douglas of Lochleven who was Moray's half-brother. Kirkcaldy of Grange was asked to lead a feud against all Hamiltons, but declined. Following a battle at Linlithgow Bridge at the end of April 1570, a state of civil war ensued in Scotland until the end of the "Lang siege" of Edinburgh Castle.

One of the finest remaining brasses in Scotland commemorates the murdered Earl of Moray, and is located in Saint Giles Kirk, Edinburgh. It carries the Moray arms and figures representing Religion and Justice.

=== Exile ===
After a time, Hamilton left the country and went to France, where he offered his services to the Guise family, kinsmen of Mary. He was asked to assassinate Gaspard II de Coligny; however, he refused, stating that a man of honour was entitled to settle his own quarrels, but not to murder for others.

Hamilton's uncle, the Archbishop of St. Andrews, was captured at Dumbarton and tried and convicted of art and part in the Regent's killing. He was hanged at Stirling.

At least two of Bothwellhaugh's letters home were intercepted and kept by the English Secretary of State William Cecil. One letter asked a servant of Mary Queen of Scots to send him financial aid because he had lost "all he had to live on for her Majesty's service". Another one written after the Archbishop's death tells younger brother David Hamilton that he is sending to him with their brother, John Provost of Bothwell, his long guns, pistols and a bulletproof breastplate.

=== Guilty verdict after nine years ===
The Hamilton family was declared rebel in October 1579 by the Parliament of Scotland following the capture of their strongholds at Hamilton and Draffen in May. On 21 October 1579 and 10 November, the parliament heard a narrative of the Regent's murder. James Hamilton was called "of Woodhouslee" and "of Woodhouslee alias Bothwellhaugh" in the record. He was said to have shot Regent Moray twice in the belly and navel on 23 January 1570, with a gun loaded with two lead balls. By his flight to France he had taken responsibility for the treason and murder.

The parliamentary account was derived from the testimony of Arthur Hamilton of Myreton (or Merington), Captain of Hamilton, who was executed in Stirling for his part in the murder on 30 May 1579. James Hamilton's brother Arthur, who was said to have held James's stirrup at Linlithgow (for the getaway) was questioned at Stirling in May 1579, but several lords spoke for his life to be saved.

Four other Hamiltons were accused of directly participating in the Linlithgow murder at the assize at Stirling in May 1579, including David Hamilton, son of Hamilton of Mirington, laird of Sillerton, but they denied the charge and were imprisoned. The main perpetrator, James Hamilton of Bothwellhaugh, was still in France: in the letters of the English ambassador Lord Cobham his title was spelled "Bodilaugh", perhaps an indication of how the name was said.

=== Other accessories ===
Christian Shaw, James's mother, the widow of David Hamilton of Bothwellhaugh, was charged with assisting the assassination in February 1571 at Lanark. James's brother, Arthur Hamilton of Bothwellhaugh, was acquitted in January 1581. On 16 June 1582, George Hume of Spott was charged with, among other crimes, helping the assassination by welcoming the "actual committaris", named as James Hamilton and his brother John, the Provost of Bothwell, after the shooting, at his house at Neidpath-Head. The Regent's widow Agnes Keith and daughter Elizabeth Stuart were represented at the proceedings, and Spott was acquitted of the other charges.

=== Heirs restored ===
James Hamilton's brother David, his wife Isobel Sinclair and her sister, Alison Sinclair, David's wife, were fully restored to the forfeited inheritance of Woodhouselee in January 1592, apparently despite the resistance of the Lord Clerk Register. The lands had been forfeited for Moray's murder and reserved, despite previous acts of restoration, to Lewis Bellenden of Auchnoule and Broughton. David Hamilton, who was also called "Hamilton of Monktonmains" had shared the exile of Lord Claude Hamilton in France, who was now back in royal favour.

An Act of Parliament of 24 June 1609 clarified their possession of Woodhouselee against the interests of William Bellenden of Broughton.

== Timothy Pont ==
Pont's map of Linlithgow shows the houses of the High Street, one of which was the property of Archbishop Hamilton from which James Hamilton of Bothwellhaugh shot the Regent, James Stewart, Earl of Moray in 1570. Pont's map even details the gallery from which the shot was probably fired.

== David Hamilton ==
His brother David Hamilton is buried at Crosbie church, and his daughter Christian married into the Fullarton of Crosbie family. Christian Hamilton may be the Dame "Corsbi" mentioned in a 1580 letter of Mary, Queen of Scots. Another daughter, Alison, married Gavin Hamilton, Bishop of Galloway. A Fullarton family tradition suggests that this David Hamilton may have been closely involved in or might even have been the true assassin of the Earl of Moray. David had been forfeited and excluded from the 1573 Treaty of Perth, however his lands were returned to him by an act of 1592.

In the apparent absence of recorded legal repercussions, a 19th-century historian, John Bain, put forward the view of his patron John Smith of Swindrigemuir, that David and James Hamilton probably were present at Linlithgow and their servant Pate Wilson may have fired the fatal shot.

In 1545 John Hamilton, Abbot of Paisley, feued to his kinsman David Hamilton and his wife Christian Shaw (who may have been a close relation of the Abbot), James's father, the lands of Monktonmains (later known as Fairfield) near Prestwick. Thus James's younger brother David, who died in 1619, was Hamilton of Monktonmains and also Bothwellhaugh. Hamilton of Wishaw has it that David died in 1613. John Colville wrote that David participated in the struggle at Stirling in September 1571 when Regent Lennox was killed.

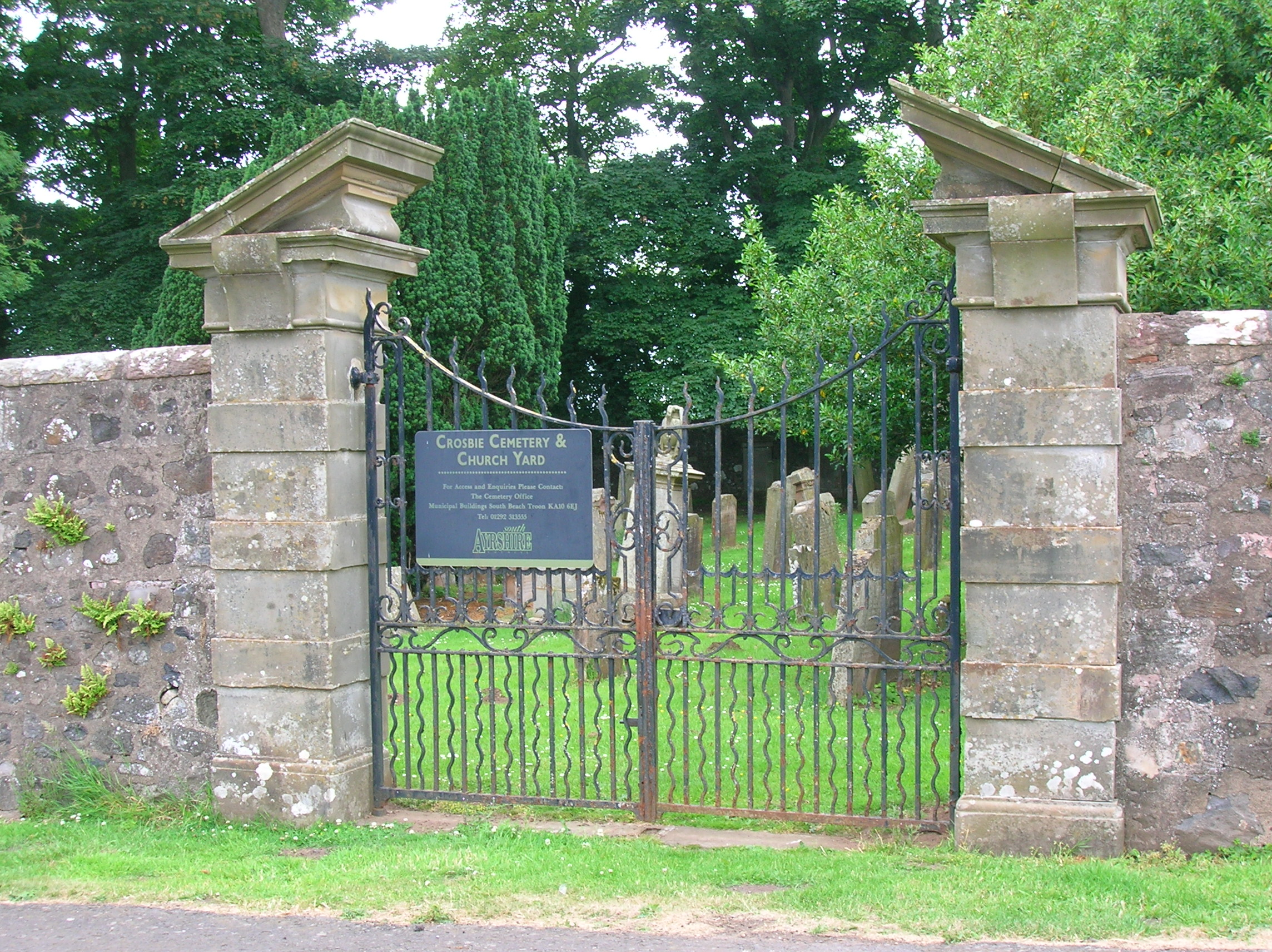
Crosbie church gates.

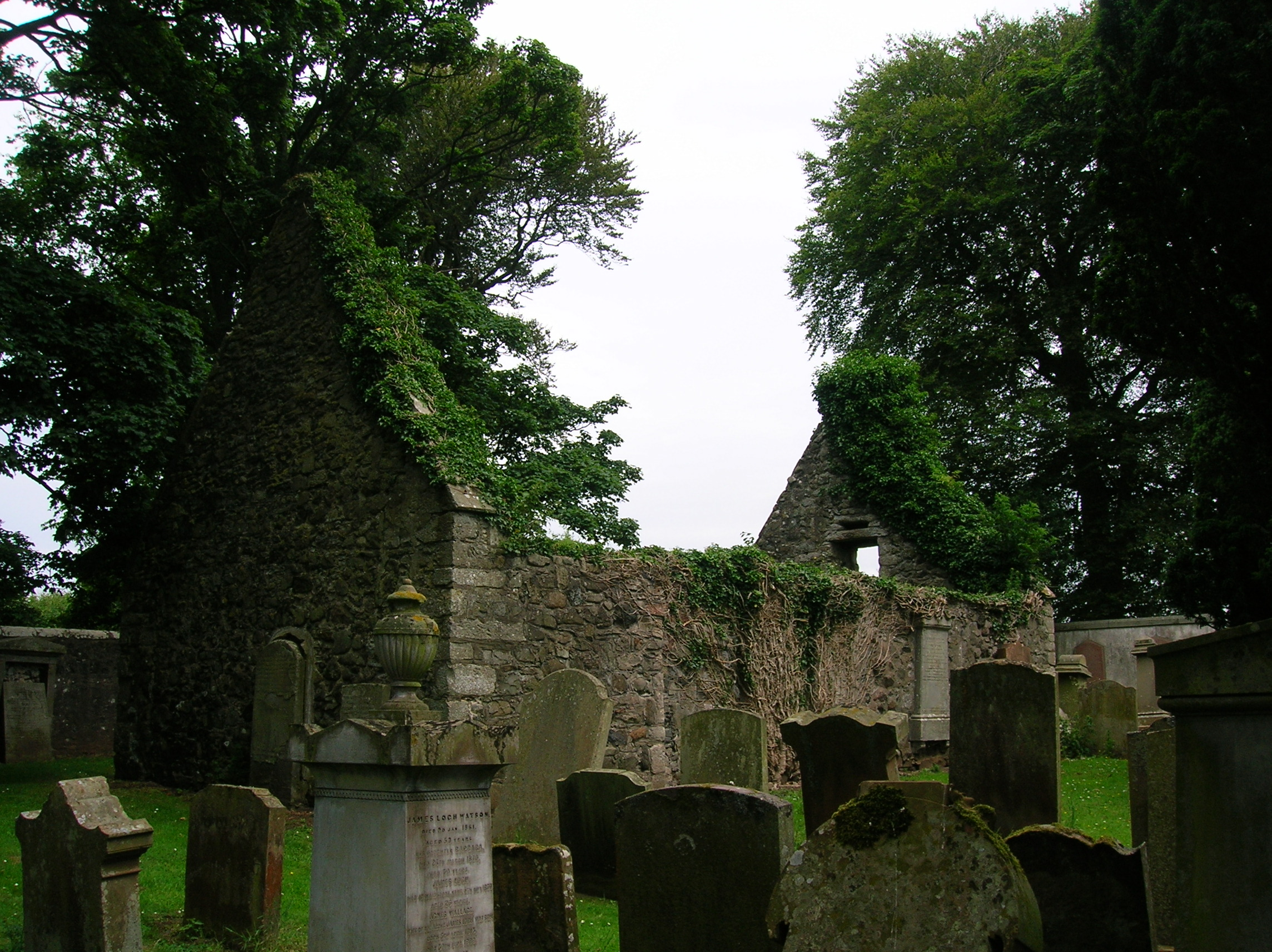
Crosbie Church and cemetery.

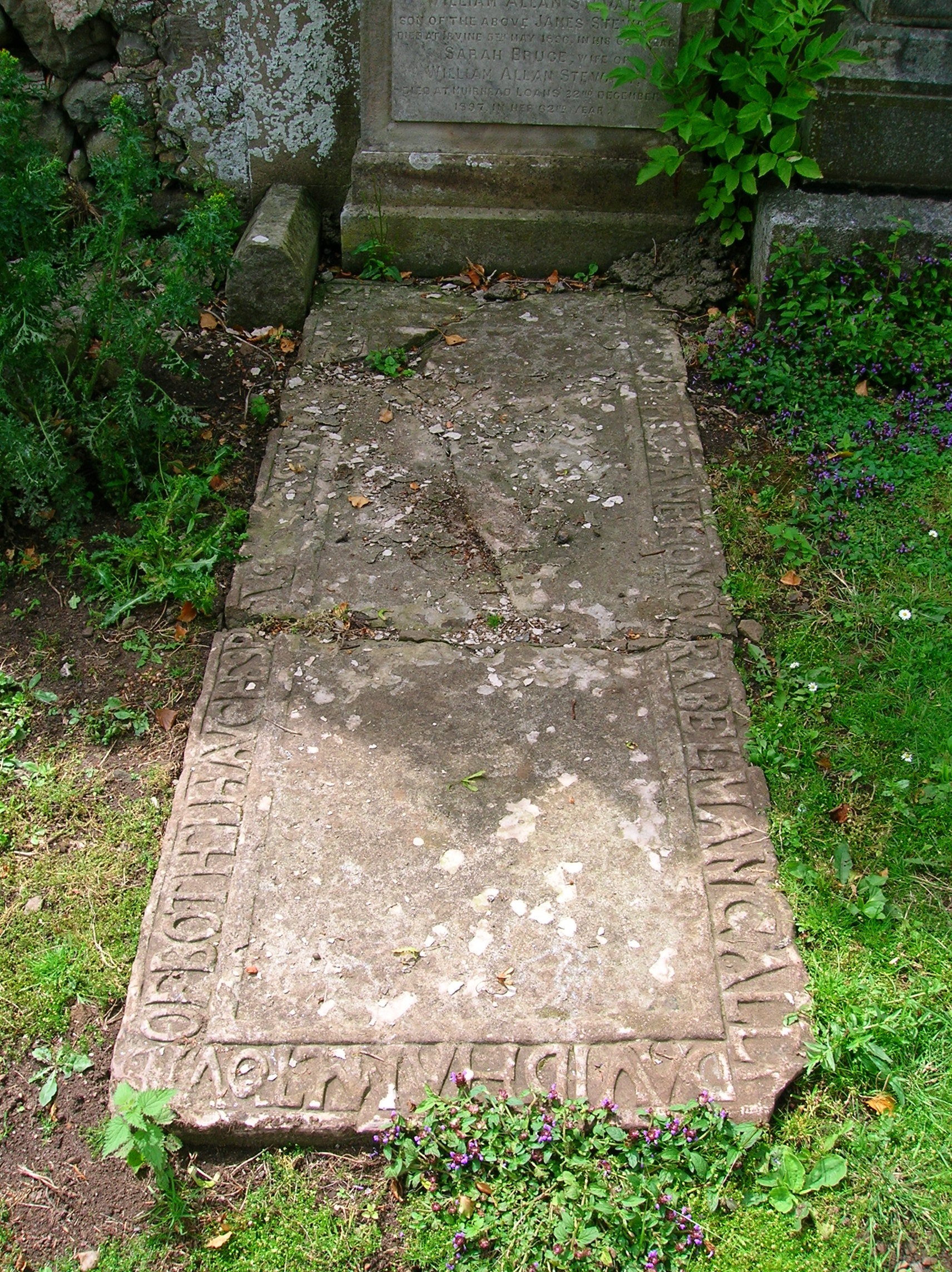
David Hamilton of Bothwellhaugh's gravestone probably erroneously dated 1619, possibly following re-cutting.

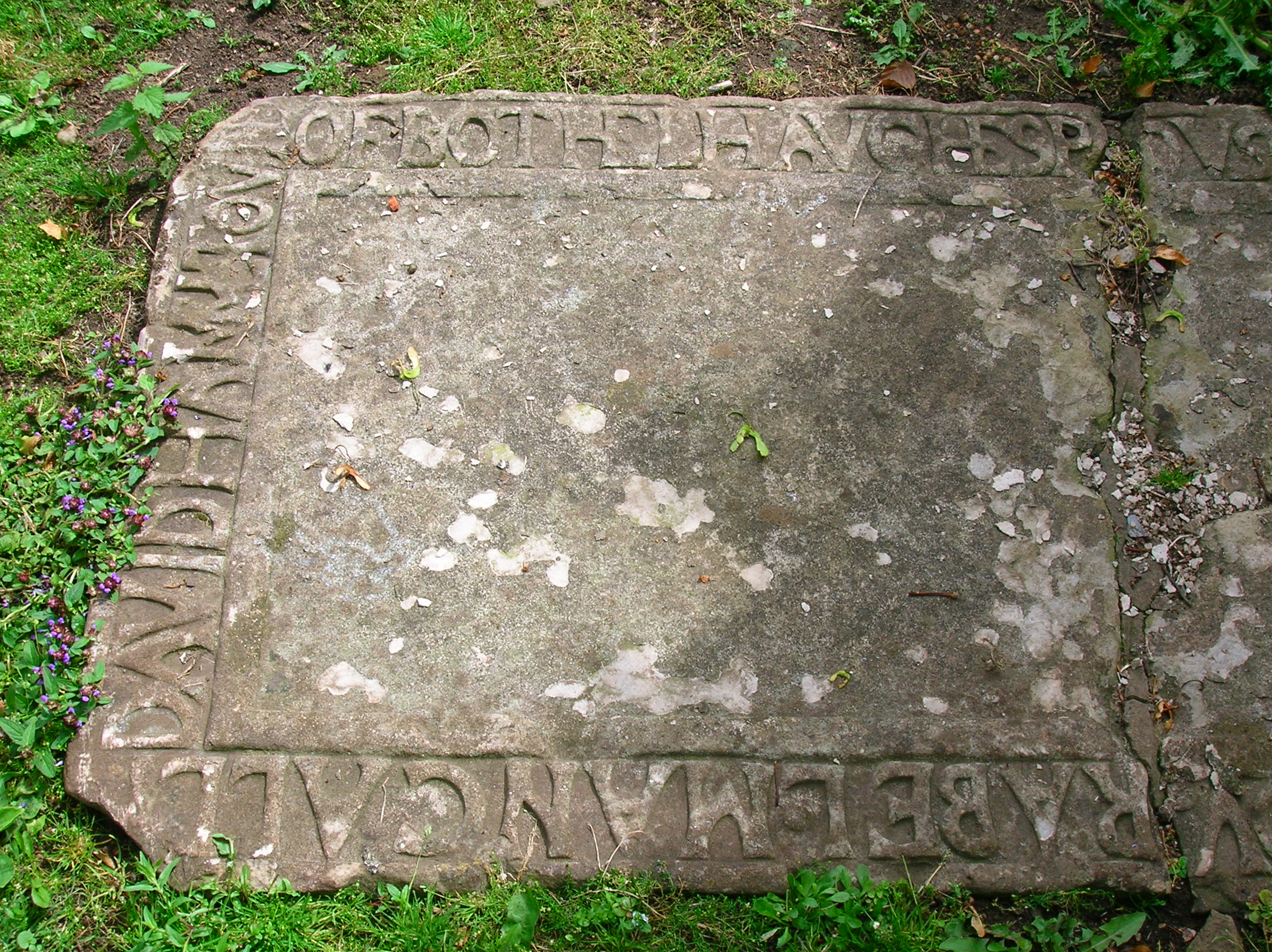
The inscription on David Hamilton's gravestone.

== See also ==
- Crosbie Castle and the Fullarton estate
