= Alexander Gibson, Lord Durie II =

Scottish judge

Sir Alexander Gibson, with a legal courtesy title Lord Durie held as his father did (died 1656) was a Scottish judge.

== Life ==
The eldest son of Alexander Gibson, Lord Durie I (died 1644) and his wife Margaret, eldest daughter of Sir Thomas Craig of Riccarton, he was made a clerk of session with his father who was promoted to the Scottish bench in 1621. He opposed Charles I's Scottish religious policy based on the service-book, and protested against the royal proclamations of 1638. He petitioned the presbytery of Edinburgh against the bishops, November 1638, and was commissary-general of the forces raised to resist Charles I in the Second Bishops' War of 1640.

Gibson was, however, knighted 15 March 1641, and made lord clerk register 13 November 1641. He was made a commissioner of the Scottish exchequer 1 February 1645, and sat on the committee of estates (1645–8). He became lord of session in 1646, when he took the title of Lord Durie.

In 1649 Gibson was deprived of his offices by the act of classes, after joining the "engagement" with the king. The diarist John Lamont noted how Gibson and his wife were regarded as "malignants". He was one of the Scottish commissioners chosen to attend the English parliament in 1652 and 1654, and died in June 1656.

== Family ==
Gibson was twice married; first to Marjory Hamilton, by whom he had one daughter; secondly to Cecilia, daughter of Thomas Fotheringham of Powrie, by whom he left Sir Alexander Gibson of Durie, knt., commissioner to parliament in England for Fife and Kinross 1656–9, and for Fife 1659, who died at Durie 6 August 1661.

== Notes ==
Attribution

This article incorporates text from a publication now in the public domain: Stephen, Leslie, ed. (1890). "Gibson, Alexander (d.1656)". Dictionary of National Biography. Vol. 21. London: Smith, Elder & Co.
