= Alexander Belsches, Lord Tofts =

Scottish judge and Senator of the College of Justice

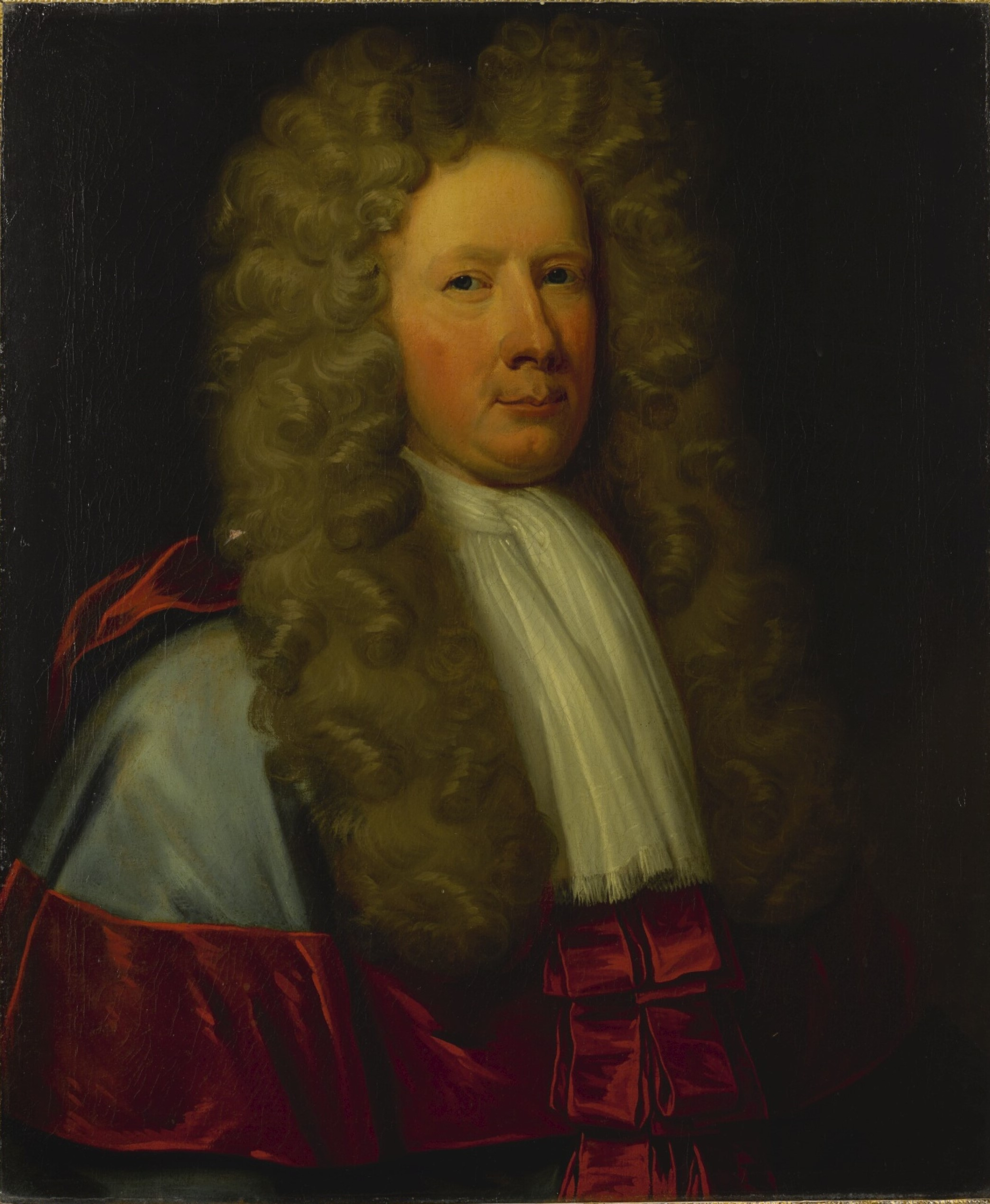
Portrait of a Judge, believed to be Sir Alexander Belsches of Tofts

Alexander Belsches, Lord Tofts MP (c. 1610 – 1656) was a 17th-century Scottish judge and Senator of the College of Justice.

== Life ==
He was son of John Belsches (1580-1631) an advocate, and his wife, Janet Craig, daughter of Thomas Craig of Riccarton, Lord Advocate. In 1621 his father purchased the estates of Over Tofts and Nether Tofts in Berwickshire. In 1625 his father remarried (Janet presumably being dead) to a Marjory Kae.

He inherited the Tofts estates (east of Hawick) in 1631.

In 1644 Alexander was a Member of Parliament for Berwick-upon-Tweed. In July 1646 he was knighted by Charles I of England and created a Senator of the College of Justice taking the title Lord Tofts.

In December 1648, from Carisbrooke Castle on the Isle of Wight, King Charles wrote from his imprisonment pre-execution to gran Belsches a pension of £200 per annum. In September 1650 he became Sheriff of Berwickshire.

He died in 1656.

== Family ==
He married Jean Skene daughter of John Skene of Hallyards, a Clerk of Session. They had no children.

His brother John Belsches inherited the Tofts estates but had to sell it off in sections to repay Alexander's debts. The bulk of the estate was bought by Sir William Purves (Solicitor General for Scotland) in 1673 who renamed the estate as Purves Hall.

== Artistic recognition ==
He was portrayed by Sir John Baptist de Medina.
