= Lewis Craig =

Scottish judge

Sir Lewis Craig, Lord Wrightslands (1569–1622) was a Scottish judge and Senator of the College of Justice.

Craig was the eldest surviving son of Thomas Craig of Riccarton and his wife, Helen Heriot, daughter of Heriot of Traboun.

Lewis was educated at the then newly created Edinburgh University, where he graduated M.A. in 1597. He studied the civil law at Poitiers, was admitted a member of the Faculty of Advocates in 1600, knighted and appointed an ordinary lord of session in 1604–5.

He inherited his father's properties, Riccarton House, west of Edinburgh, plus a townhouse on Warriston Close off the Royal Mile, on his father's death in 1608.

Craig married Beatrice Chyrnesyde. They had a son Thomas, and a daughter Janet, who married George Pringle.
