= Katherine Bellenden =

Katherine Bellenden (1497 – c. 1568) was a courtier working in the wardrobe of James V of Scotland. Her niece of the same name was similarly employed.

== A family at court ==
Katherine was the daughter of Patrick Bellenden a servant of Margaret Tudor and Mariota or Marion Douglas, who was the nurse of James V. Her older brother was the Justice Clerk Thomas Bellenden of Auchnoule, another brother was the priest, poet, and translator John Bellenden. Her grandson was the mathematician and poet John Napier, who invented logarithms.

Katherine married Adam Hopper (d. 1529) in 1527 receiving a royal gift of £300 as a dowry or "tochter" in thanks for her mother's service, then Francis Bothwell, who were both merchants and Provosts of Edinburgh. In 1529 Adam and Francis were business partners exporting fish to England.

Her third husband was Oliver Sinclair, the King's favourite, who was reputed to have caused the Scottish defeat at the battle of Solway Moss. In early modern Scotland married women did not usually adopt their husband's surnames.

== Altar of the Holy Blood in St Giles' Kirk ==
In 1529, a new chaplainry was established at St Giles in Edinburgh. The chaplain, Thomas Ewan, was to pray for the souls of members of the Bellenden family including Katherine and her deceased husband Adam Hopper, Oliver Sinclair, and others including the King's pursemaster John Tennent and his wife the laundress Maus Atkinson. The foundation was funded from the rents of several properties on the High Street.

== Sewing for the Stewarts ==
While Katherine worked in the royal wardrobe she bought cambric cloth, Holland cloth, and other materials for making the King's shirts, which she and her colleague Janet Douglas, the King's seamstress, embroidered with gold and silver thread. She sold cloth to the King's tailor, Thomas Arthur, and kept accounts of the King's purse. Janet Douglas, like Katherine, married a prominent courtier, David Lindsay of the Mount a diplomat and poet.

In July 1537 Katherine, described as "Master Francis Bothuilis wyfe" delivered 10 ells of purple velvet for use at the funeral of the Queen, Madeleine of Valois. Amongst the many payments to "Katherine Bellenden" in the Scottish treasurer's accounts one entry notes Katherine as the spouse of Robert Craig, a servant of the tailor Thomas Arthur. This was Katherine's namesake niece, daughter of Thomas Bellenden of Auchnoule, married to Robert Craig, later an Edinburgh textile merchant, and their children included John Craig the physician and the lawyer Sir Thomas Craig. It seems that both Katherines were employed in the royal wardrobe and dealt in luxury fabrics.

In the 1590s, Elizabeth Gibb, a lady in waiting, had a similar role sewing and embroidering shirts and ruffs and making hats for Anne of Denmark and James VI.

== Family finances ==
James V paid Katherine £666-13s-4d Scots in April 1538, this was for 1000 merks which she had lent to the King's mother, Margaret Tudor. In 1541, Oliver and Katherine with their kinsfolk and their royal wardrobe colleagues, John Tennent and his wife the royal laundress, Mause Acheson, made a contract "mortifyng" property, including the rents of part of a property on Edinburgh's Netherbow to the west of Moubray House for priests to say Mass for their souls in St Giles, Edinburgh.

In November 1543, Katherine wrote to the Queen Dowager of Scotland, Mary of Guise, regarding her and her husband's debts. A ship they had invested in had been impounded by Guise's lawyer Thomas McCalzean for sums of money they owed for lands in Orkney and Shetland. Mary of Guise was giving their Orkney lands to George Gordon, Earl of Huntly. In Orkney, Oliver Sinclair held the castle of Kirkwall as his ancestors had done, and Katherine wrote, 'we think great lack to go from our native rooms which my husband and his surname have held these three or four hundred years.'

== Children ==
Katherine and Adam Hopper had a son, Richard, who was eldest and heir to Adam Hopper after he died in 1530. Francis Bothwell was the father of Adam Bothwell, Bishop of Orkney, though it is unclear if Katherine was his mother.

Katherine had two daughters with Oliver Sinclair. Isobel Sinclair married James Hamilton of Bothwellhaugh who assassinated Regent Moray in 1570. Alison Sinclair married David Hamilton of Monktonmains, brother of Bothwellhaugh. The persons of Isobel Sinclair and her supposed cousin Anne Bothwell are conflated in the Scottish ballad, Lady Anne Bothwell's Lament. Anne Bothwell was the daughter of Adam Bothwell the bishop, and perhaps granddaughter of Katherine Bellenden. The ballad relates to her seduction and abandonment by Alexander Erskine (d.1640), a son of the Earl of Mar
