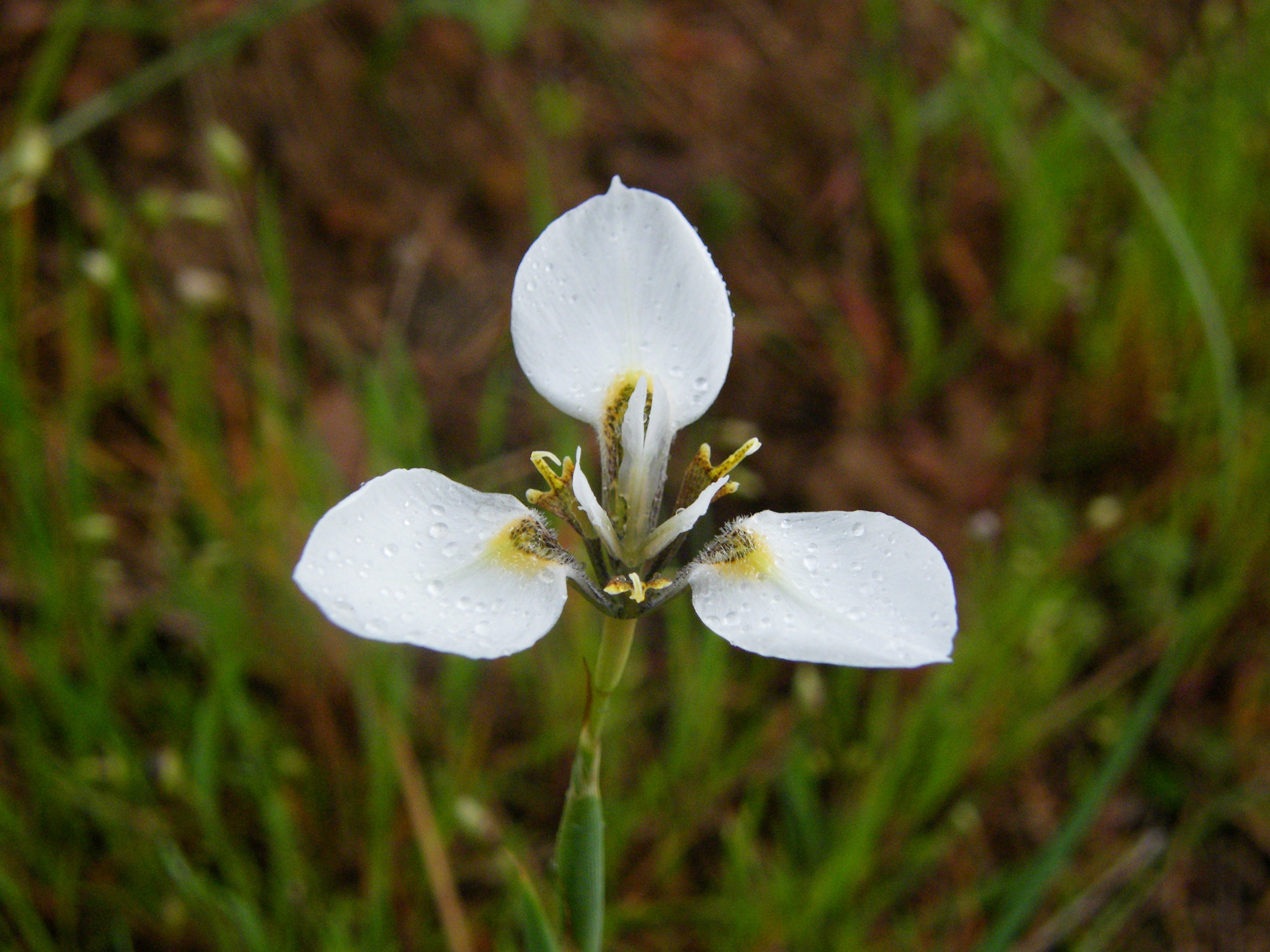

Scientific classification
- Kingdom: Plantae
- Clade: Tracheophytes
- Clade: Angiosperms
- Clade: Monocots
- Order: Asparagales
- Family: Iridaceae
- Genus: Moraea
- Species: M. tricuspidata

Binomial name
- Moraea tricuspidata (L.f.) G.J.Lewis

Synonyms
- Iris tricuspidata L.f.

= Moraea tricuspidata =

Species of flowering plant

Moraea tricuspidata, commonly known as the rietuintjie or blou-ooguintjie, is a plant and geophyte belonging to the genus Moraea, and it is part of the fynbos. The species is endemic to the Eastern and Western Cape. The plant occurs from the Cederberg mountains to Grahamstown, and the population is stable.

The plant has three subspecies:

- Moraea tricuspidata subsp. cormifera (Goldblatt) Goldblatt & J.C.Manning
- Moraea tricuspidata subsp. parviflora Goldblatt & J.C.Manning
- Moraea tricuspidata subsp. tricuspidata
