= Francis Bothwell =

Scottish merchant

- Born: Edinburgh, Kingdom of Scotland
- Occupations: Merchant, Judge and Politician

Francis Bothwell of Edinburgh, Lord of Session, was a Scottish merchant, landowner, judge and politician. As a university graduate he was called Master Francis Bothwell, or "Dominus" in Latin documents; however this has been misunderstood by some writers, so he is occasionally, inaccurately, referred to as "Sir" Francis Bothwell.

== Career ==
The elder son of Richard Bothwell, a Provost of Edinburgh during the reign of James III, Francis served as Procurator (1513–14) of the Scottish Nation at the University of Orléans in France, and was appointed a Burgess of Edinburgh in 1515, and Provost of Edinburgh in 1525.

Francis Bothwell was a Burgh Commissioner for Edinburgh in the parliaments of 1524, 1525, 1526, 1528, 1531, 1532 and 1535. He served as Lord Auditor of Causes, Lord of the Articles, and was one of the first Lords of Session when the College of Justice was founded on 27 May 1532. For his service in the first year of the Session, Francis was paid £133-6s-8d.

In June 1528 Bothwell took possession of a house on Edinburgh's Royal Mile. The house in Byer's Close had been forfeited to the Crown of Scotland because the owners had gone to England without permission, and was granted to Francis in January 1528. The present house on the site is called "Adam Bothwell's House", after his son.

Bothwell was a business partner of Adam Hopper, another Provost and merchant of Edinburgh. In 1529, the year of Hopper's death, they had been exporting fish to England. Bothwell later married Hopper's widow Katherine Bellenden. Francis Bothwell was recorded as being seriously ill in December 1535, but his date of death in unknown.

== Family ==
Bothwell married firstly Janet Richardson, daughter and co-heir of Patrick Richardson of Meldrumsheugh, and thus obtained lands in the regality of Broughton.

Their children included:

- Janet Bothwell, who married Archibald Napier of Merchiston, whose son was the mathematician John Napier.
- Richard Bothwell was Provost of Edinburgh during the reign of King James the third.
- Adam Bothwell was Bishop of Orkney, a Lord of Session, and the father of John Bothwell, Lord Holyroodhouse.

It is unclear if Adam Bothwell was a son of Francis Bothwell's first wife, Janet Ricardson, or his second wife, Katherine Bellenden. Katherine was involved in the supply of cloth to the royal court; in July 1537 "Master Francis Bothuilis wyfe" delivered purple velvet for use at the funeral of the Queen of the Scots, Madeleine of Valois.
