= Oliver Sinclair =

Scottish courtier (died c. 1576)

Sir Oliver Sinclair of Pitcairnis and Whitekirk (died circa 1576) was a favourite courtier of King James V of Scotland. He was a Sheriff of Orkney. A contemporary story tells that James V gave him the battle standard and command at the Battle of Solway Moss. Another story tells how at the end of his life he shamed the haughty servant of Regent Morton by showing him how his own prosperity had faded.

== Life ==
=== At the royal court ===
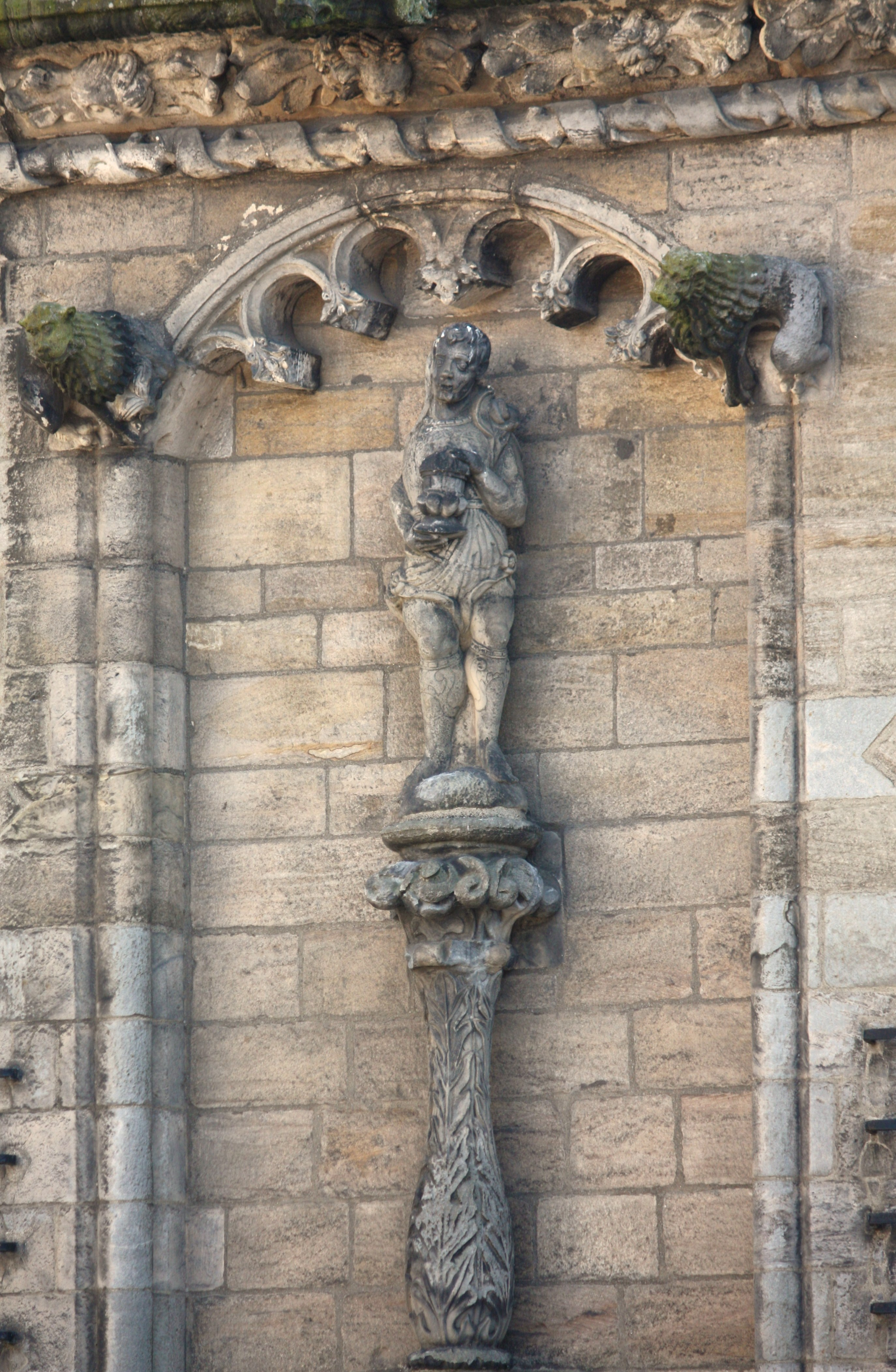
A statue of a young man in classical armour holding a cup at the palace of James V at Stirling Castle

Oliver Sinclair was the third son of George Sinclair, eldest son and heir-apparent of Oliver St Clair, 12th Baron of Roslin, and George's spouse, Agnes Crichton. In 1539, he was granted the additional lands barony of Allhammer, also known as Whitekirk.

Like many minor aristocrats, Oliver Sinclair had a role at the royal court where he became a fourite of James V. Oliver and his wife Katherine Bellenden were involved in the administration of the King's purse with John Tennent. Sinclair had the keeping of the king's purse during his trip to France in 1537. He bought some feathers for decorations at the King's entry to Paris and the tournaments following the wedding at Notre Dame. Sinclair also bought feathers in February 1541. As a gift, Oliver Sinclair, brought 196 rabbits from the warrens of Dunbar to court for Christmas 1539.

Sinclair was also cupbearer at court, and he was given livery clothes at Christmas time to the value of £20. This was the second tier; the clothes of the two Masters of the Household cost £50, the laundress Maus Atkinson's (John Tennent's wife) livery was £13-6s-8d, and the outfits of the men who turned the spit in kitchen cost 26 shillings and eightpence. When the King's mother Margaret Tudor was dying in October 1538, Sinclair and John Tennent rode with the King to her at Methven Castle. She had died when they arrived, and Oliver and John were ordered to parcel up her belongings.

John Tennent and Oliver Sinclair practiced archery with Mary of Guise. A bow, glove, arm brace, and a dozen arrows were bought for her in 1542.

Oliver Sinclair's brother, Henry Sinclair, was treasurer of Brechin and rector of Glasgow. He had a role in crown finance as an auditor of the accounts of the masters of works and the account of money spent by David Beaton in France.

=== Solway Moss and after ===
Oliver Sinclair was captured by the English at the Battle of Solway Moss in November 1542. Among a list of prisoners, Oliver, James Sinclair, and Alexander Sinclair were listed together as men of small value and substance. They were released with the Laird of Cleisburn's son kept as their hostage or 'pledge' in England. George Douglas of Pittendreich sent a report to Henry VIII stating that Sinclair was commander. However, reports by the English commanders fail to mention any commanding role. George Douglas was also the source of the story that James V died in a feverish delirium at Falkland Palace still lamenting the loss of his standard and the capture of his favourite Oliver at Solway. Whether or not Sinclair actually was commander at the defeat of the Scottish army, the immediate currency of the story shows that James V's employment of lesser nobles caused jealously amongst those who were excluded, especially the exiled Douglas Lords. Henry VIII obtained another story on 12 December 1542, before the death of James V and the birth of Mary, Queen of Scots were known, that James V had left his army in the west and gone to Tantallon Castle to meet a mistress that Oliver's wife kept there for him.

Cleisburn's son was still a prisoner after the Battle of Pinkie, and was released in February 1548. The Privy Council ordered Thomas Wharton to free the "pledge" but asked him to protract the process, if possible, to increase Cleisburn's devotion to England. Oliver Sinclair himself was given a reward of £50 from Edward VI on 17 February 1548 when the deal was concluded.

David Hume of Godscroft writing around 1600 gives the usual story of Oliver deserted by the nobility of Scotland at Solway (Solemne-Mosse), but adds an epilogue to his career. Regent Morton, in the 1570s, had a servant, George Auchinleck of Balmanno, who controlled access to his master and thereby justice. One day Sinclair came to Edinburgh Tollbooth and caught Auchinleck's attention, and when he came over and asked his business, all the old man said was, "I am Oliver Sinclair", then slipped away. Hume of Godscroft explains that Sinclair meant that Auchinleck would all too soon become insignificant, and the incident was much discussed at the time.

== Stories of Solway Moss ==
George Douglas of Pittendreich's account of the events before Solway was that after James V had left the Scottish army, Oliver Sinclair was appointed commander instead of Lord Maxwell. Some Scots who would not accept Oliver's authority then refused to fight and the battle was lost. This account was accepted by subsequent sixteenth-century Scottish chronicle writers. However, writing about 80 years after, the author and poet William Drummond of Hawthornden collated an alternative version of events. Hawthornden attributed the defeat to a misunderstanding; Sinclair was tasked only to deliver the message that Maxwell was in command, and when he was raised up to speak, the anxious army thought he had been made leader. During their confusion the English attacked.

== Family ==
Oliver married Katherine Bellenden. Their daughter Isobel married James Hamilton of Bothwellhaugh, who assassinated Regent Moray in 1570.
