= Chris Guest =

Chris Guest may refer to:

- Christopher Guest, Baron Guest (1901–1984), British judge
- Christopher Guest (born 1948), American actor
- Chris Guest (artist) (born 1979), British artist
