= Chris Guest (artist) =

British artist

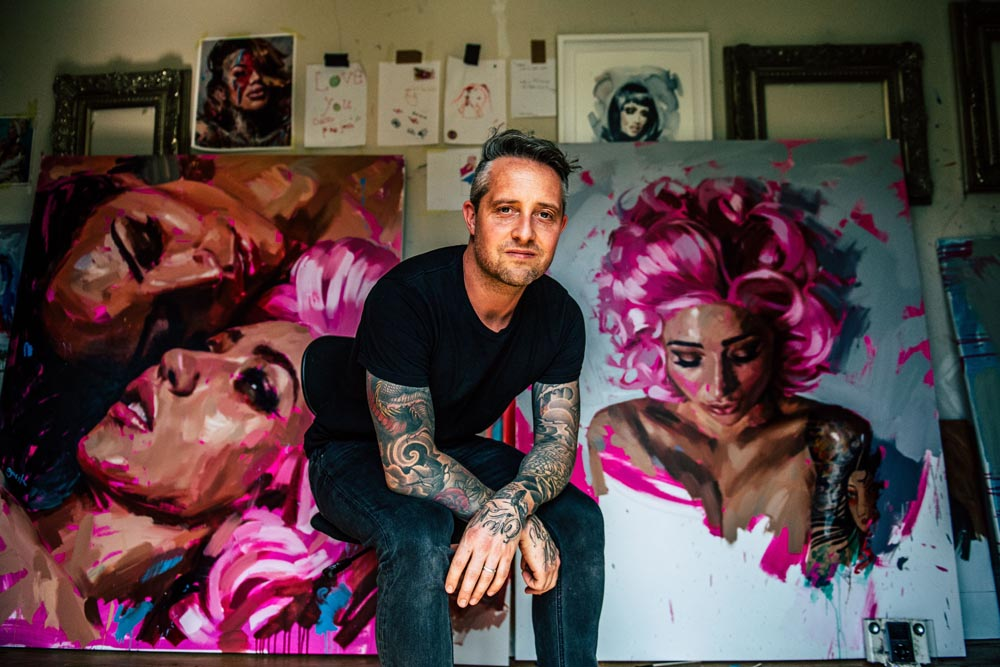
Chris Guest in his Studio

Chris Guest is an artist living in London who creates paintings that focusing on heavily tattooed people, utilizing classical oil painting techniques to create paintings in a figurative tradition, coupled with a contemporary twist. His work has been described as having a "pin-up" style that brings together the past with the modern and he has been cited as one of 15 artists that depict the tattooed community through incredible large-scale art.

== Career ==
Chris Guest is best known for his oil paintings of highly tattooed people. His originals and prints are collected worldwide, and his art has been featured in many magazines, publications and galleries around the globe including Tattoodo, Artist Talk Magazine Metro and Hobo Jack. Chris also holds regular painting workshops around the UK, US and Europe.
