= James Cockburn (minister) =

Scottish scholar and minister

- Born: James Hutchison Cockburn; 29 October 1882; Paisley, Scotland
- Died: 20 June 1973 (aged 90)
- Occupations: Clergyman, scholar
- Title: Minister of Dunblane Cathedral; Moderator of the General Assembly of the Church of Scotland

James Hutchison Cockburn DD ThD FSAScot (29 October 1882 – 20 June 1973) was a Scottish scholar and senior Church of Scotland clergyman. He served as Moderator of the General Assembly in 1941 and 1942, the highest position in the Church of Scotland.

== Biography ==
=== Church career ===
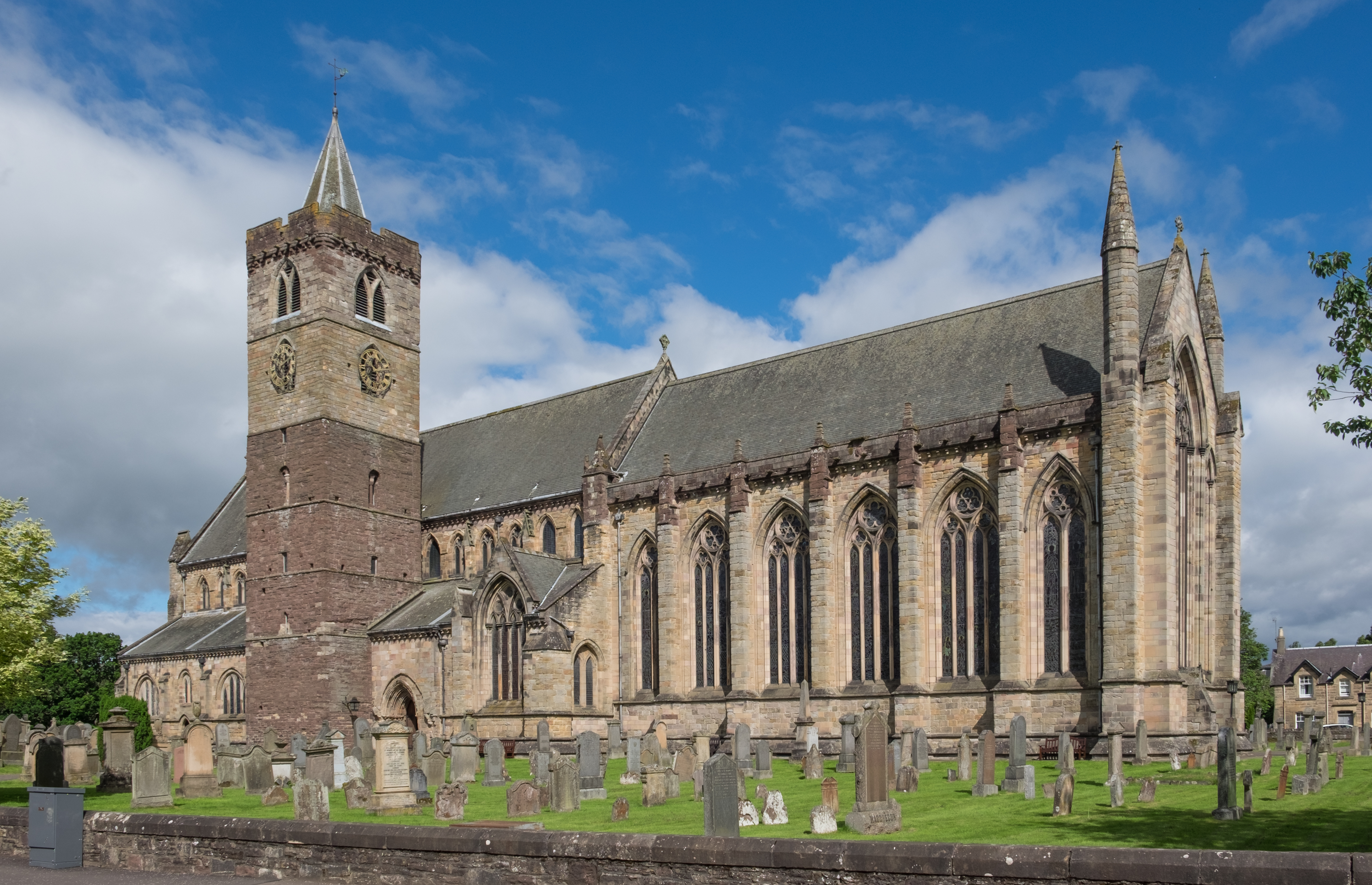
Dunblane Cathedral, where Cockburn served for many years.

Born in Paisley on 29 October 1882, he was the eldest child of George Hanna Cockburn (a schoolmaster) and Isabella Brodie Marshall. After receiving his school education in Paisley, he studied at the University of Glasgow, graduating in Arts and Divinity.

In 1908 he was ordained in Mearns parish; in 1914 he was translated to Battlefield parish, Glasgow. He married Amy Macloy, daughter of another minister, in 1912, who would in time bear him a son and daughter. During World War I he was a British army chaplain, serving in France, Egypt and East Africa.

After the war, he returned to Scotland, where on 8 May 1918, he became minister at Dunblane Cathedral. In the following years he served as the convener of the Business Committee of the General Assembly of the Church of Scotland, and was convener of the Committees on Church and Nation and Inter-Church Relations, and was clerk to the committee from 1927 until 1929, promoting union between the Church of Scotland and the United Free Church.

During World War II, Cockburn served as moderator of the General Assembly of the Church of Scotland (1941–1942), as well as briefly being vice-chairman of the British Council of Churches.

In 1944, he became a Chaplain to King George VI, and retained such a position after the accession of his daughter Elizabeth II in 1952. When he died in 1973, he was Senior Extra-Chaplain to the Queen.

Cockburn departed Dunblane in 1945 for Geneva, taking the position of Director of the Department of Reconstruction and Inter-Church Aid of the World Council of Churches. From 1952 until 1954 he was a member of the Royal Commission on Scottish Affairs.

=== Academic life ===
From 1931 until 1934 Cockburn was a lecturer on Pastoral Theology at St Mary's College, St Andrews. He was the William Belden Noble Lecturer at Harvard University in 1942, and served as Warrack Lecturer on Preaching in Edinburgh, 1944–1945. In 1951 he was Otts Lecturer at Davidson College, North Carolina.

In 1930, he was one of the founders of the Society of Friends of Dunblane Cathedral, whose journal he edited between 1930 and 1965. He created a museum for the church in the Dean's House, and used his connections to acquire material to fill it. Cockburn contributed many articles for this journal. Cockburn also published several books on religious history:

- The Celtic Church in Dunblane : a View of the Scottish Church from S. Ninian to the Culdees and the coming of the Roman Catholic Church, Dunblane: Society of Friends of Dunblane Cathedral, 1954
- Religious Freedom in Eastern Europe, Richmond, Virginia: John Knox Press, 1953
- The Medieval Bishops of Dunblane and their Church, Dunblane: Society of Friends of Dunblane Cathedral, 1959

By his death on 20 June 1973, Cockburn had received honorary doctorates (Doctor of Divinity and Doctor of Theology) from the University of Glasgow, University of Prague, Yale University, Occidental College, Los Angeles, and Wooster College, Ohio.

== Notes ==
Religious titles
| Preceded by J. R. Forgan | Moderator of the General Assembly of the Church of Scotland; 1941–1942 | Succeeded by C. W. G. Taylor |
