= John Alexander Ford =

Scottish artist (1864–1925)

John Alexander Ford (12 June 1864 – 19 August 1925) was a Scottish landscape artist working in the Impressionist style in later life. In art he is known as John A. Ford.

== Life ==
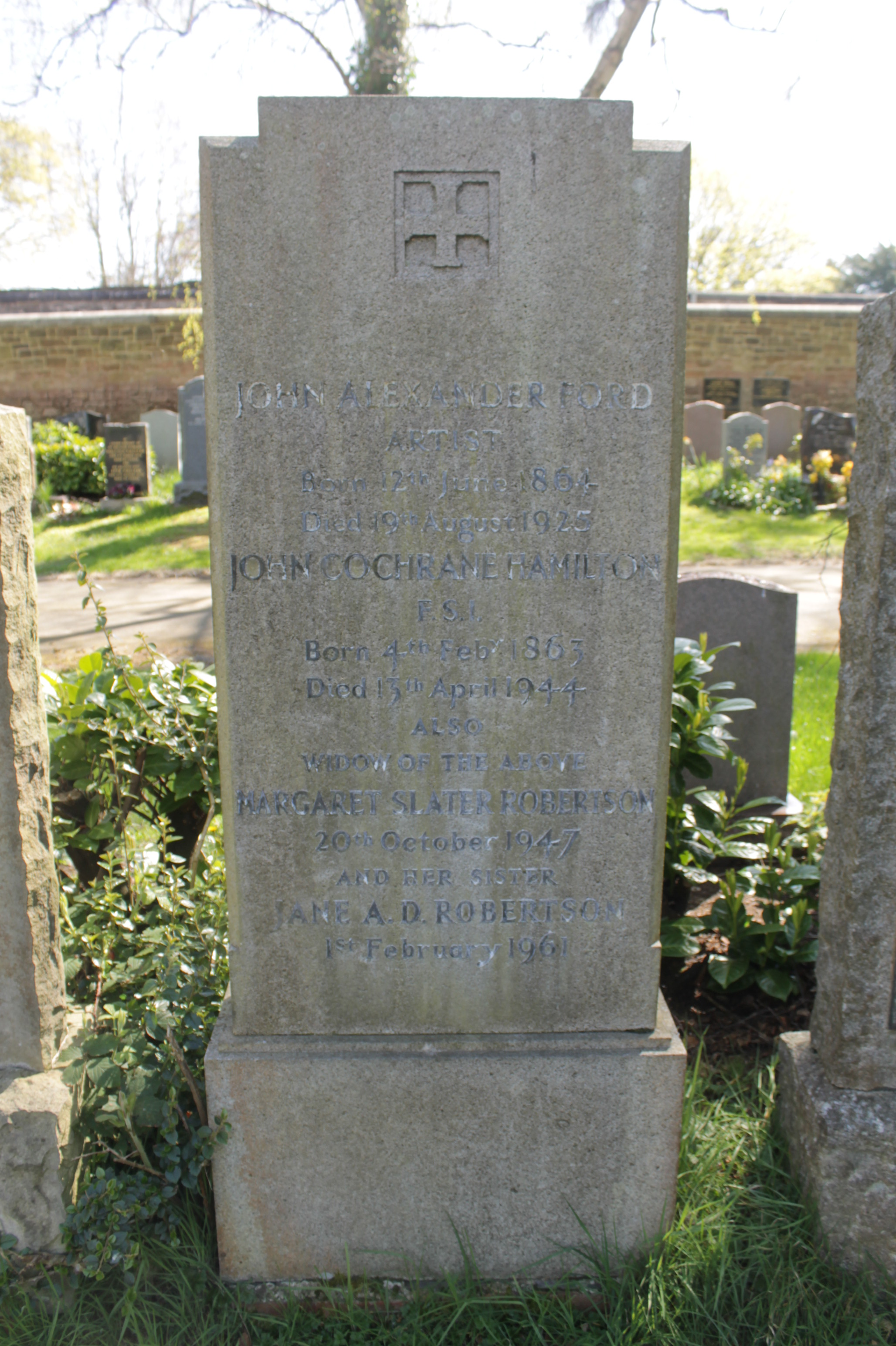
The grave of John Alexander Ford, Dean Cemetery

He was born in Leith, Edinburgh, Scotland, on 12 June 1864 the son of James Ford a licensed grocer. The family lived at 1 Vanburgh Place, a fine Georgian townhouse facing Leith Links.

From at least 1890 to 1910, he was living at 4 Picardy Place at the head of Leith Walk. His style changed from traditional to impressionist around 1895. Although his works are not well-represented in public galleries, they sold well allowing him to live in this exceptional property.

He died on 19 August 1925 and is buried in the northern 20th century extension to Dean Cemetery on Queensferry Road in west Edinburgh.

== Works ==
- Sheep in a Loch Landscape
- Overlooking Princes Street Gardens
