= William Law (Lord Provost) =

Scottish merchant (1799–1878)

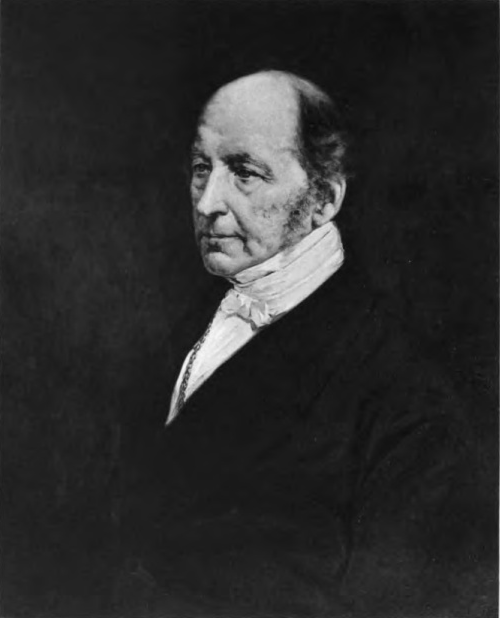
William Law, Lord Provost of Edinburgh

William Law (1799–1878) was a 19th-century Scottish merchant who served as Lord Provost of Edinburgh from 1869 to 1872.

== Life ==
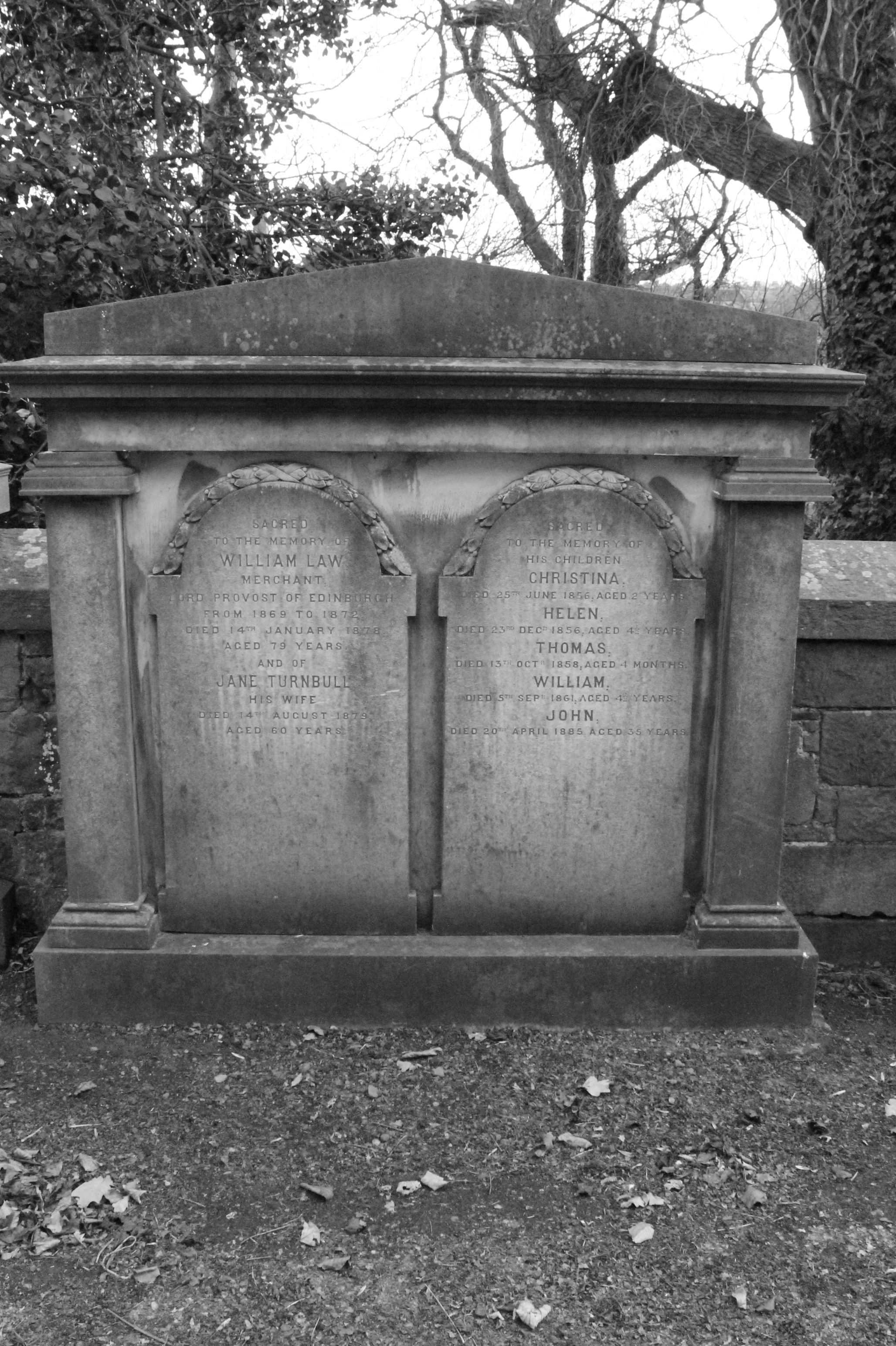
The grave of lord provost William Law, Dean Cemetery

He was born in Edinburgh the oldest son of William Law, a merchant.

In 1830 he (or his father) had a store at 31 Hanover Street, living nearby at 37 George Street.

From 1835 he ran a tea and coffee shop at 31 St Andrew Square. By 1840 his younger brother George joined and they created W & G Law. In 1850 William was living at 24 Stafford Street.

He ran the shop with his younger brother George, under the name of W & G Law at 31 St Andrew Square in Edinburgh and later expanded to 544 Oxford Street in London.

In 1869 he succeeded William Chambers as Lord Provost. He was succeeded in turn by James Cowan in 1872.

The principal changes in the city during his control were: erection of the Edinburgh Royal Infirmary on a new site on Lauriston Place; installation of the first city tramway; erection of the statue of Greyfriars Bobby; and siting of the Ross Fountain in Princes Street Gardens.

In later life he lived at 7 Chester Street in Edinburgh's West End.

He died in Edinburgh on 14 January 1878 and was buried in Dean Cemetery. The grave lies on the east section of the main south path, backing onto the hidden southern terrace.

== Family ==
He married Jane Turnbull (1819–1879) twenty years his junior, around 1850. At least four of their children died in infancy. John Law (b.1855) continued the coffee shop after his father's death and inherited the house at 7 Chester Street. He moved to 41 Heriot Row shortly before dying in 1885. In 1890 all family members were dead but John's wife was still living at Heriot Row and the shop still existed as W & G Law at St Andrew Square.

== Artistic recognition ==
Law was portrayed in office by Robert Gibb. The picture is held in Edinburgh City Chambers.
