= James Simpson Fleming =

Scottish lawyer and banker

James Simpson Fleming FRSE (1828–1899) was a Scottish lawyer and banker. From 1858 to 1871 he was a partner in the legal firm of McGrigor, Stevenson & Fleming. In the 1870s he was responsible for introducing the Royal Bank of Scotland to London.

== Life ==
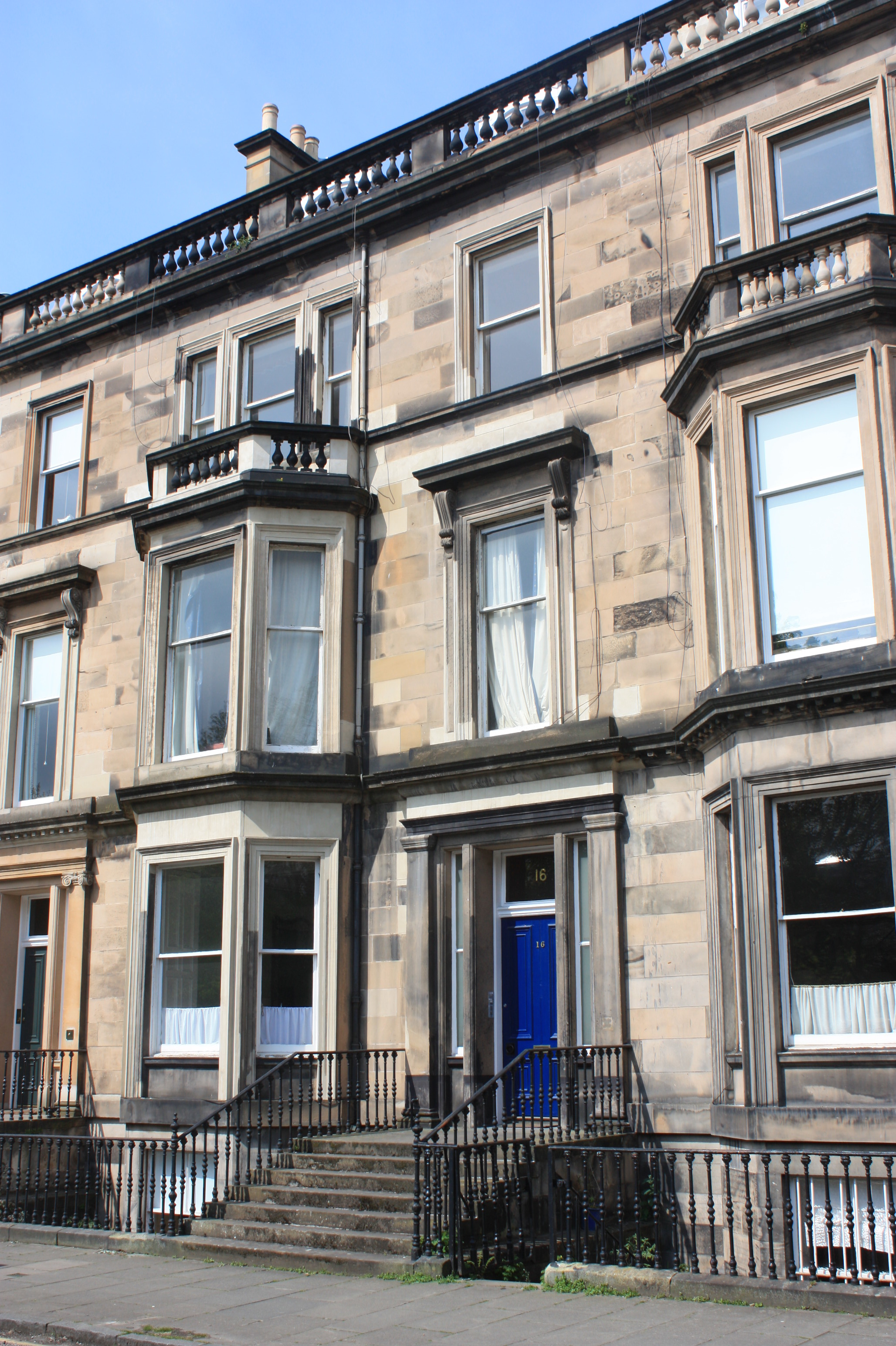
Fleming's house at 16 Grosvenor Crescent, Edinburgh

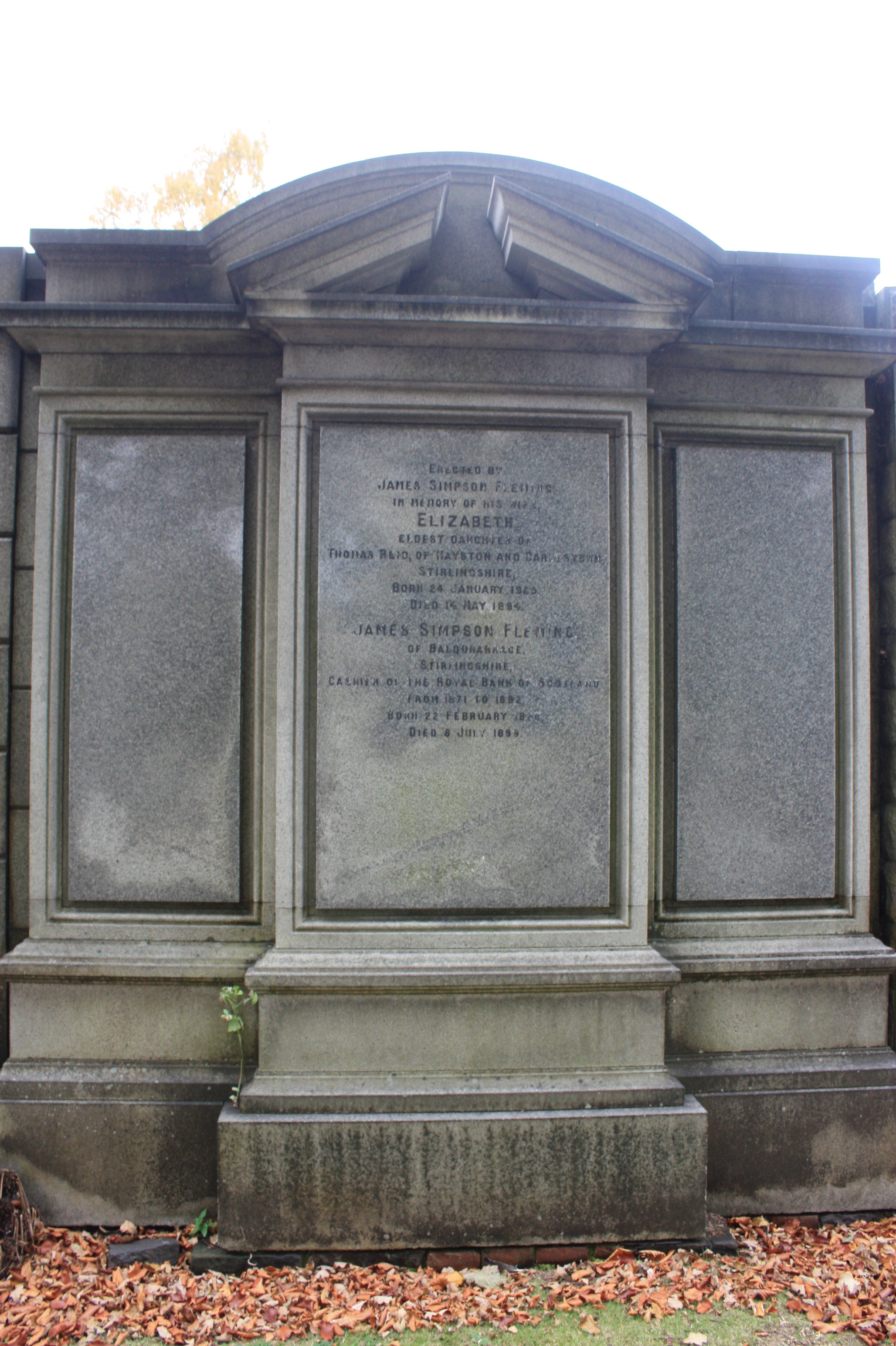
The grave of James Simpson Fleming, Dean Cemetery

He was born in Forfar in 1828. He was baptised on 7 March 1828. He was educated locally then apprenticed as a lawyer. He then went on to study law at the University of Edinburgh and the University of St Andrews. In March 1847 he began working at the Western Bank of Scotland in Glasgow, leaving in 1852 to set up his own legal practice. He returned to the bank in 1854 combining his two skills as the bank's legal adviser. He rose to become sole manager of the bank. His investigation of financial irregularities at the bank led to it ceasing trading in November 1857 (a major scandal of the day). Fleming assisted in the bank's liquidation. At this time Fleming was living at 9 Park Street East in Glasgow.

After a period practising law he again turned to bank work, and in 1871 became Senior cashier and General Manager of the Royal Bank of Scotland. During the next ten years Fleming made major improvements to the company, bringing it to the forefront of Scottish banking. This included a critical move in 1873 to establish a base in London requiring a change in the original 1727 legal conditions upon the bank, limiting it to practice only in Scotland. In 1875 Fleming's knowledge successfully fended off a challenge by the English banks, objecting to the Scottish invasion. In 1878 Fleming also advised during the massive collapse of the City of Glasgow Bank.

In 1876 he was elected a Fellow of the Royal Society of Edinburgh. His proposers were George Auldjo Jamieson, Andrew Douglas Maclagan, David Stevenson and David Smith.

He retired to Edinburgh in 1892 and died at home 16 Grosvenor Crescent on 8 July 1899. He is buried with his wife Elizabeth in Dean Cemetery in western Edinburgh. The grave lies in the northwest corner of the Victorian north extension, against the north wall.

== Other Positions of Note ==
- Chairman of Glasgow Chamber of Commerce (c.1864–1871)
- Director of the Scottish Widows Fund 1871–1898
- Justice of the Peace for both Stirling and Edinburgh

== Publications ==
- Scottish Banking: A Historic Sketch (1877)

== Family ==
In 1852 he married Elizabeth Reid (1825–1894). They had five children.
