= Dean Cemetery =

Historic Victorian cemetery in Edinburgh

Coordinates: 55°57′12″N 3°13′20″W

Designations

Inventory of Gardens and Designed Landscapes in Scotland
- Official name: Dean Cemetery
- Designated: 30 March 2001
- Reference no.: GDL00135

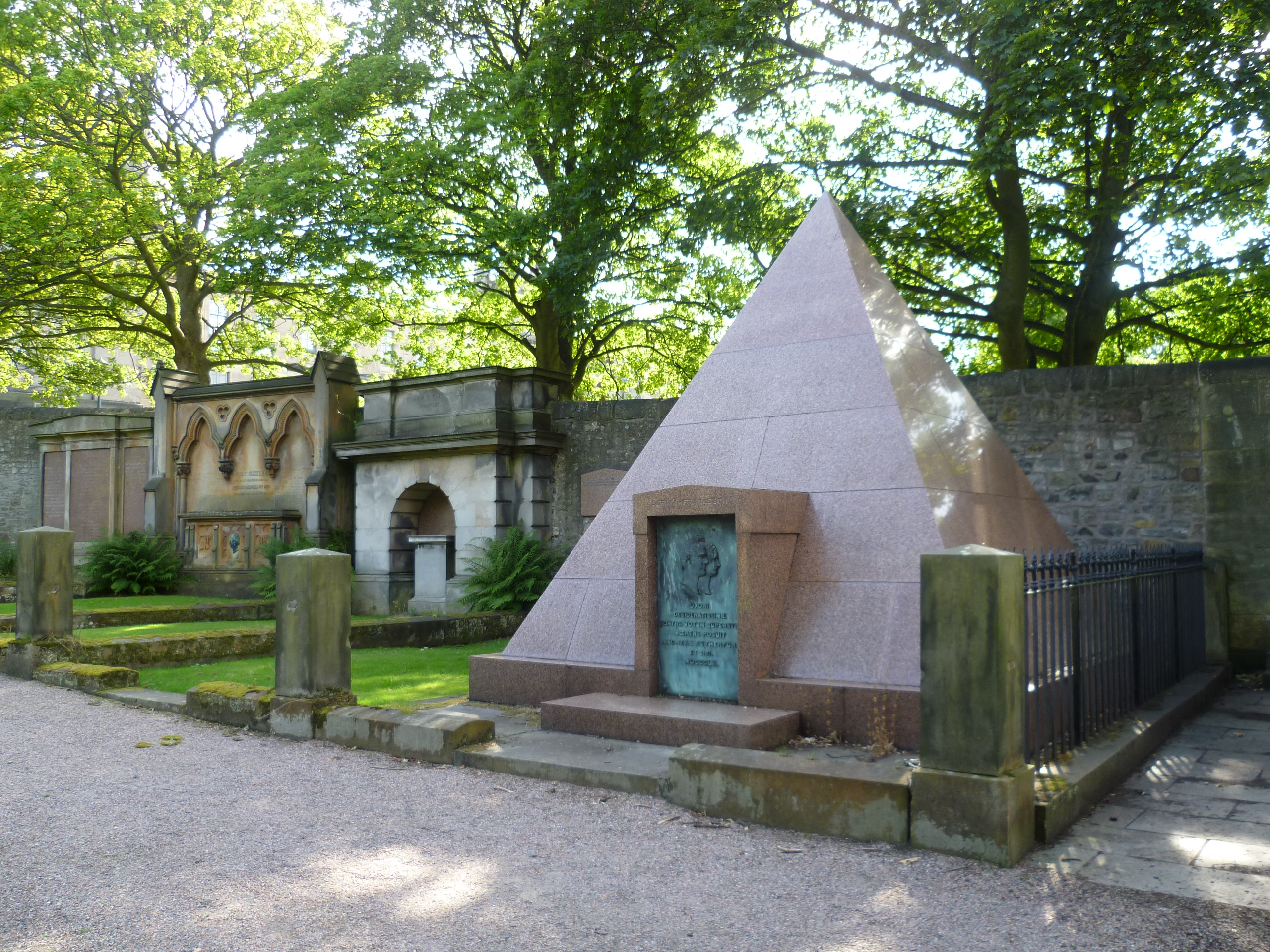
The Lords Row, Dean Cemetery, Edinburgh

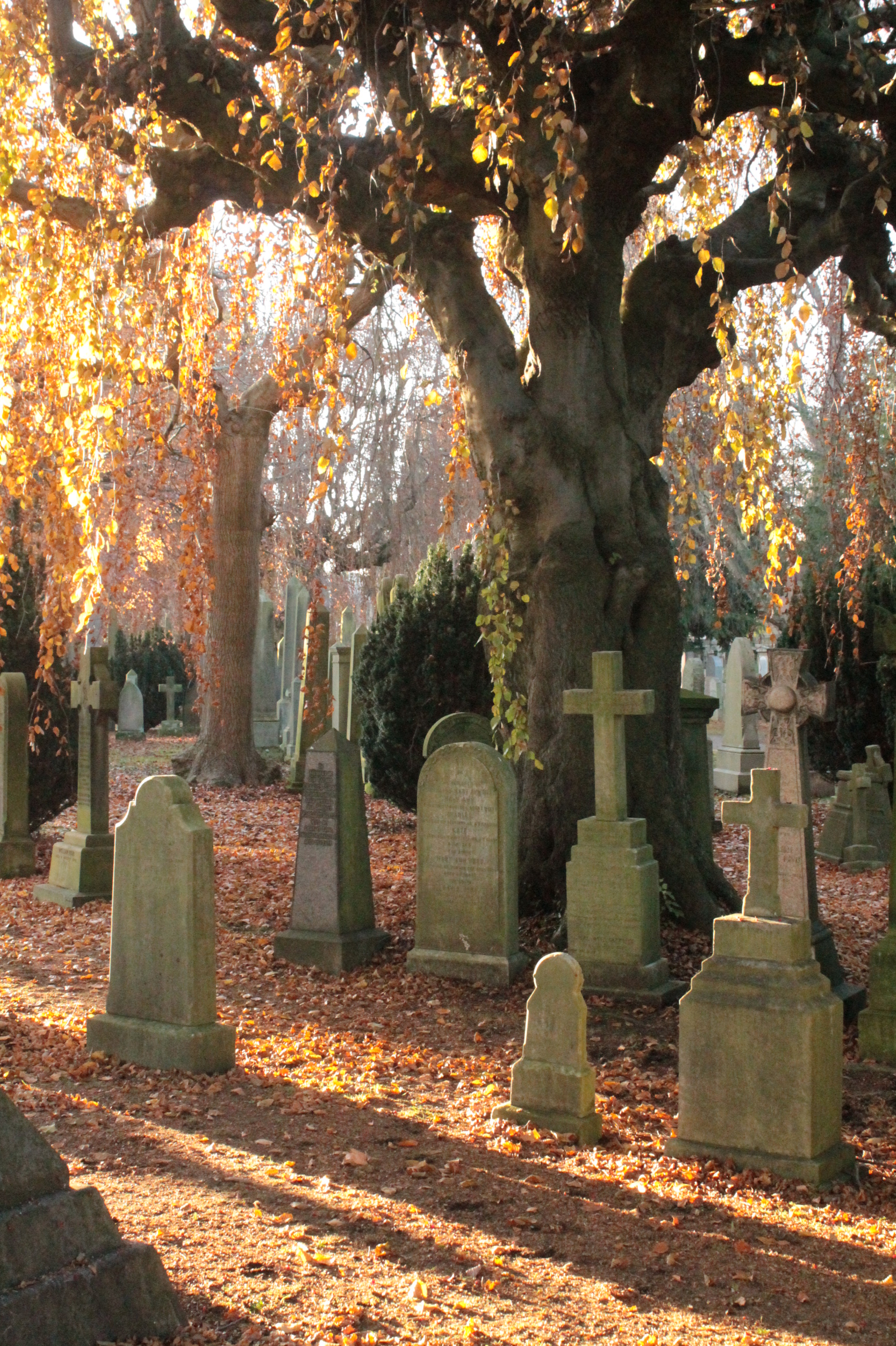
Autumn in Dean Cemetery, Edinburgh

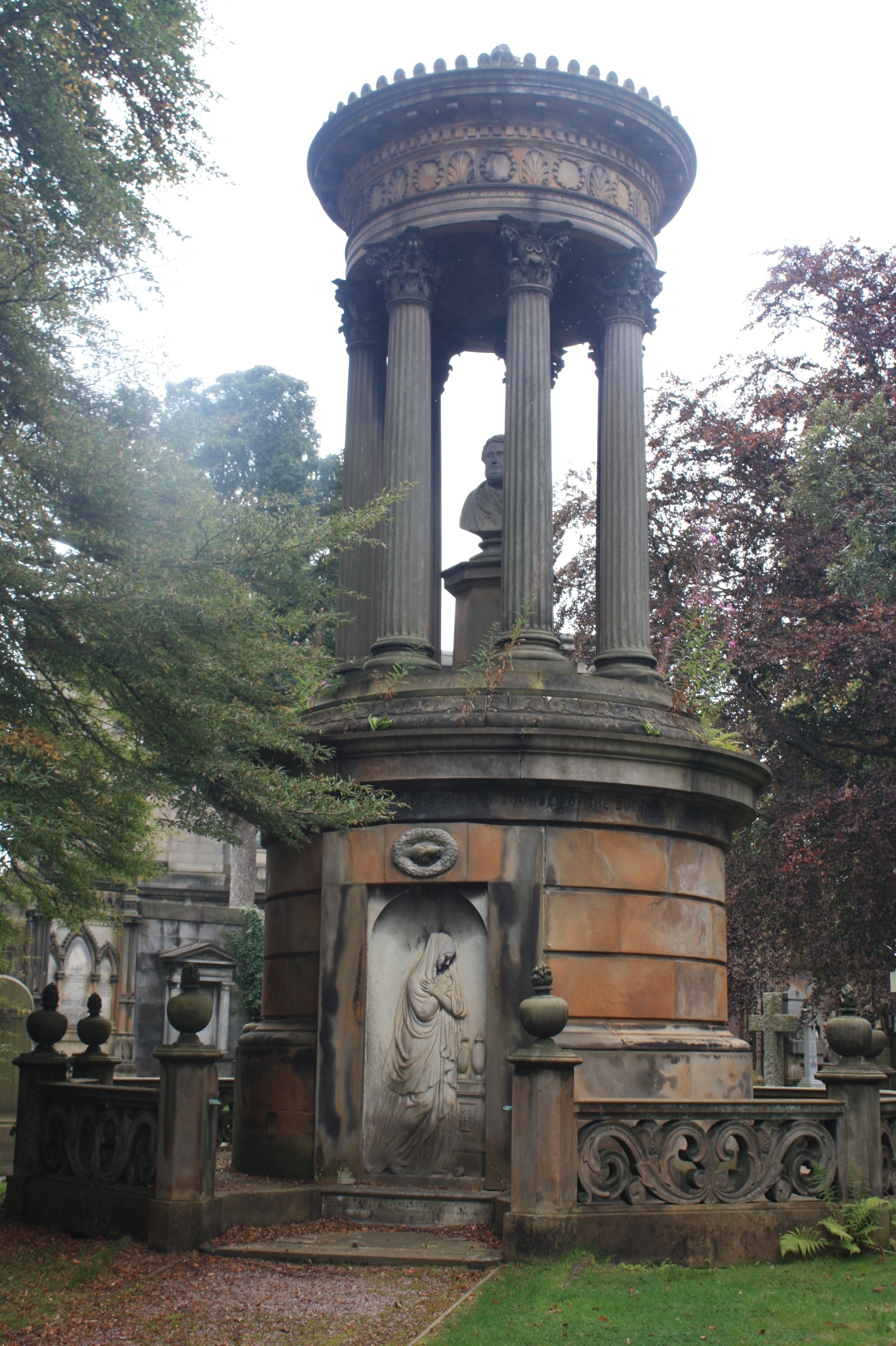
The huge Buchanan Memorial, Dean Cemetery

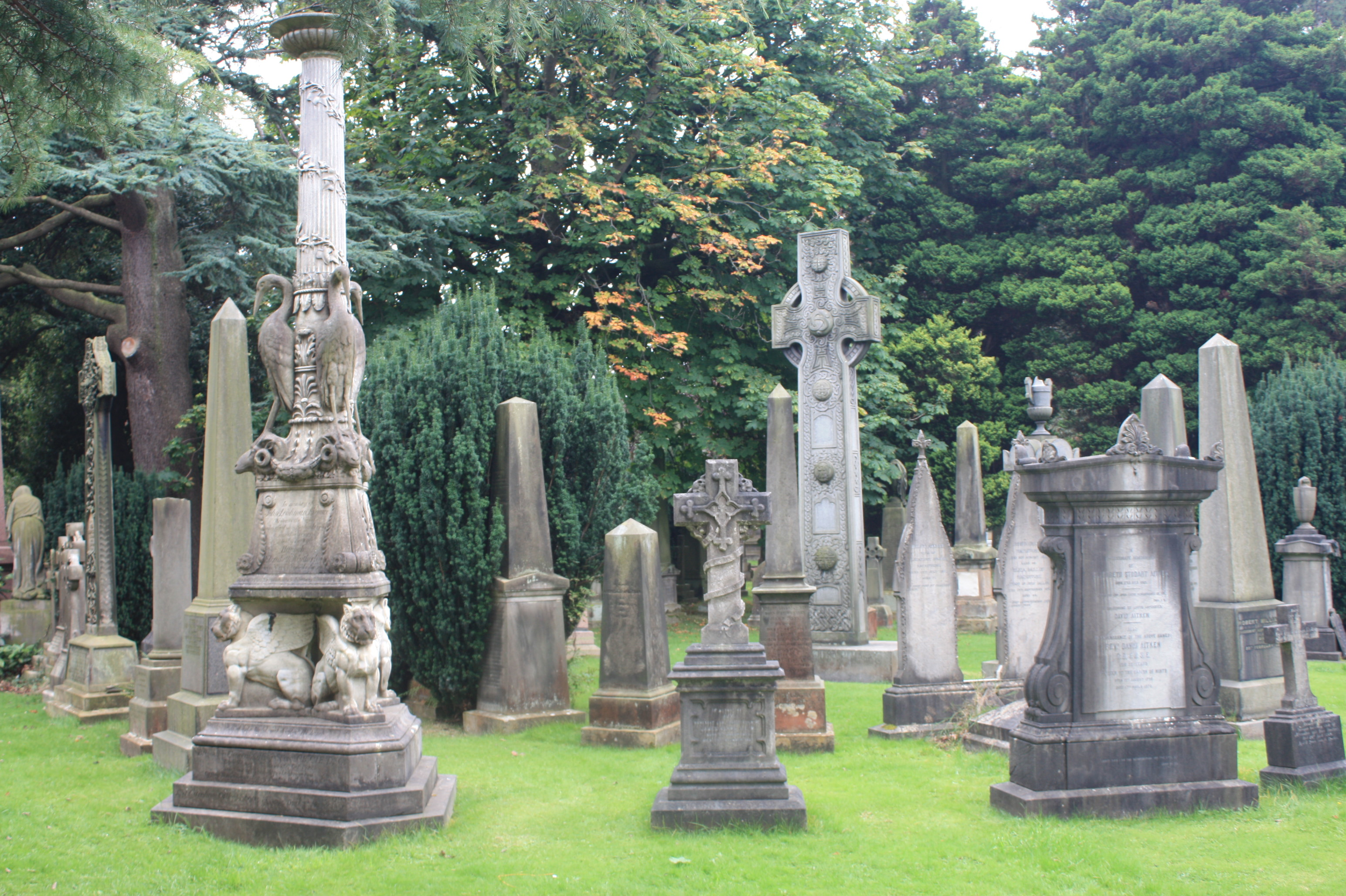
The south-west section of Dean Cemetery

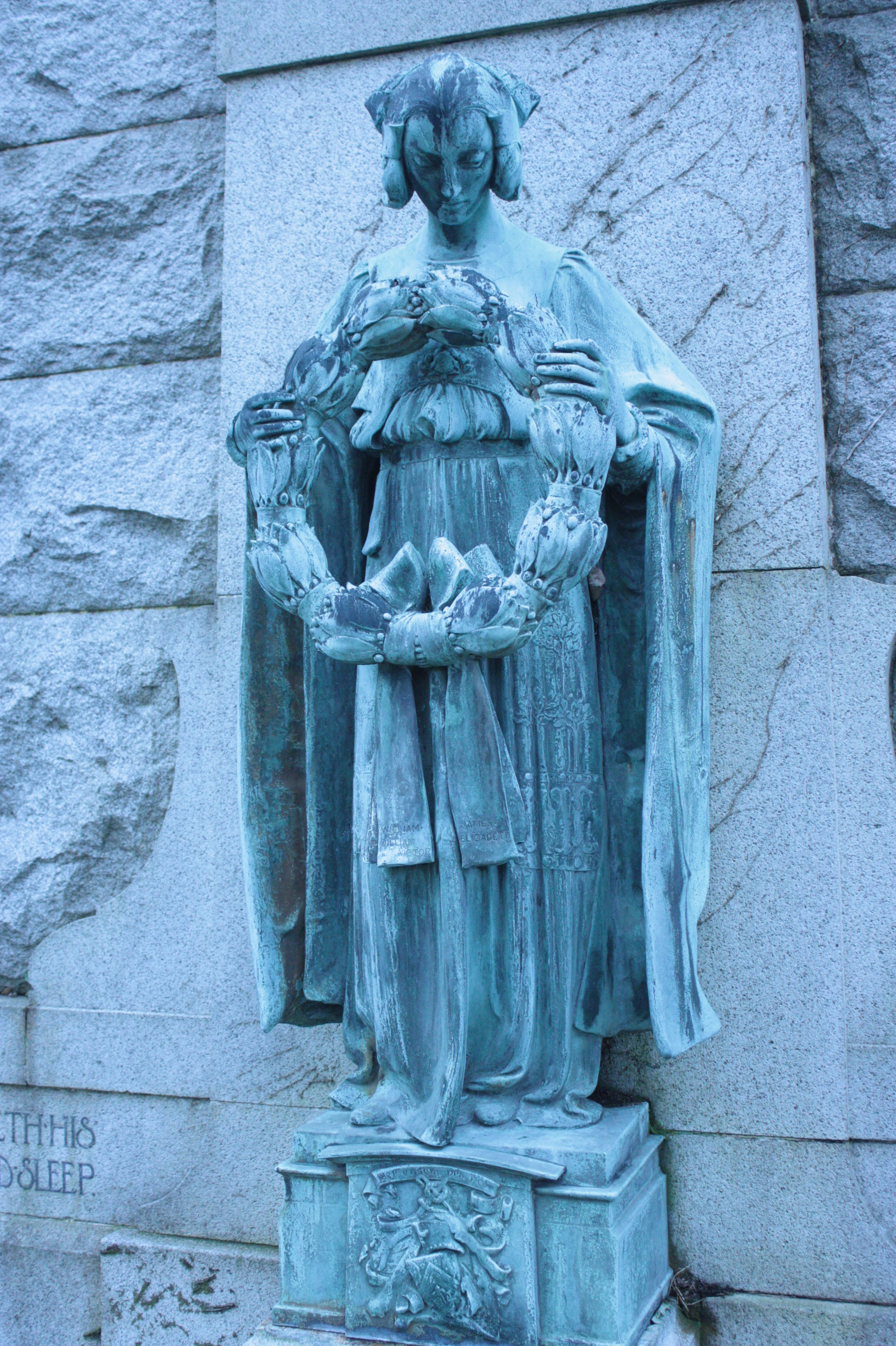
George Frampton figure, Dean Cemetery

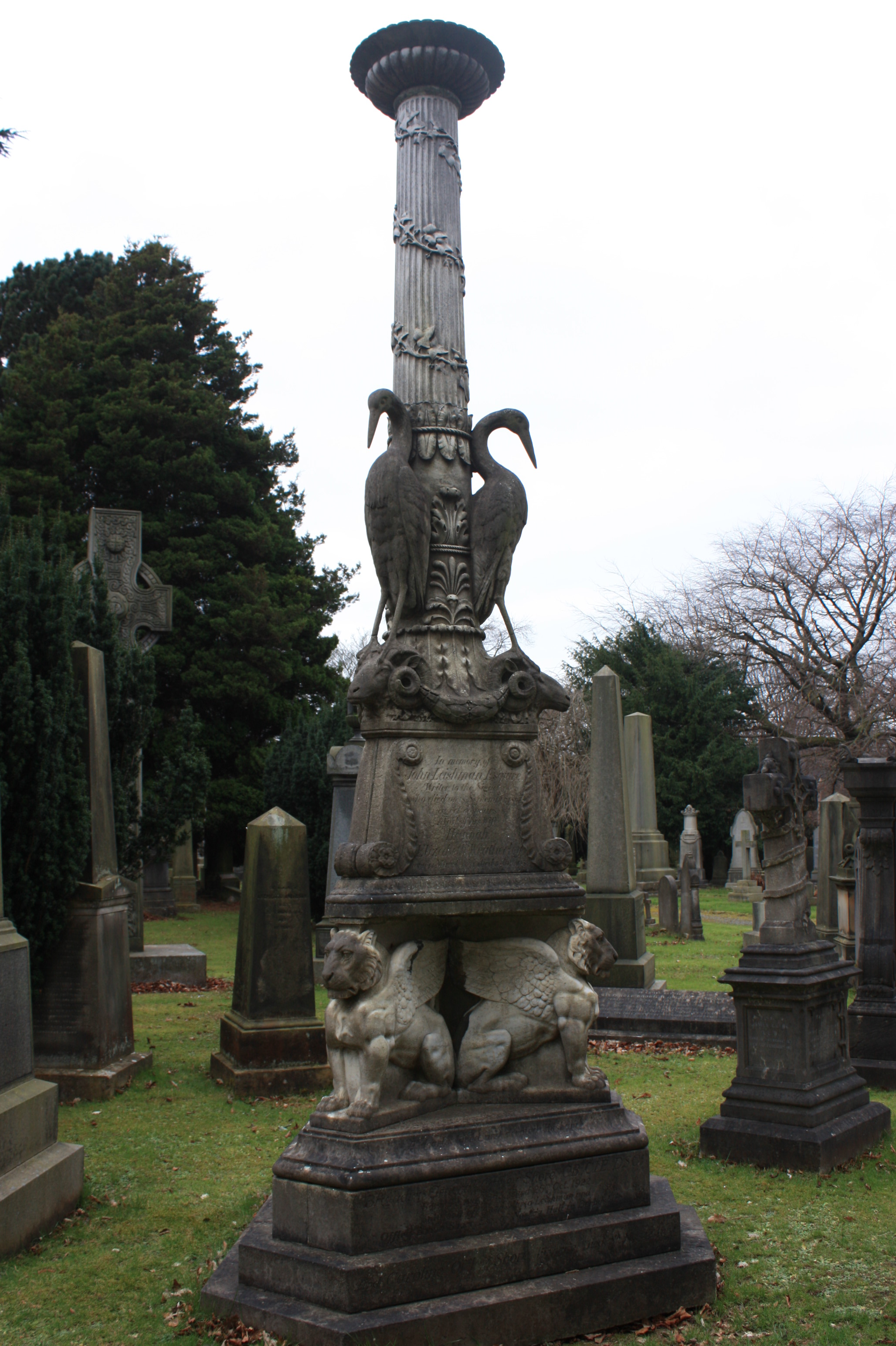
The large and ornate monument to James Leishman, Dean Cemetery

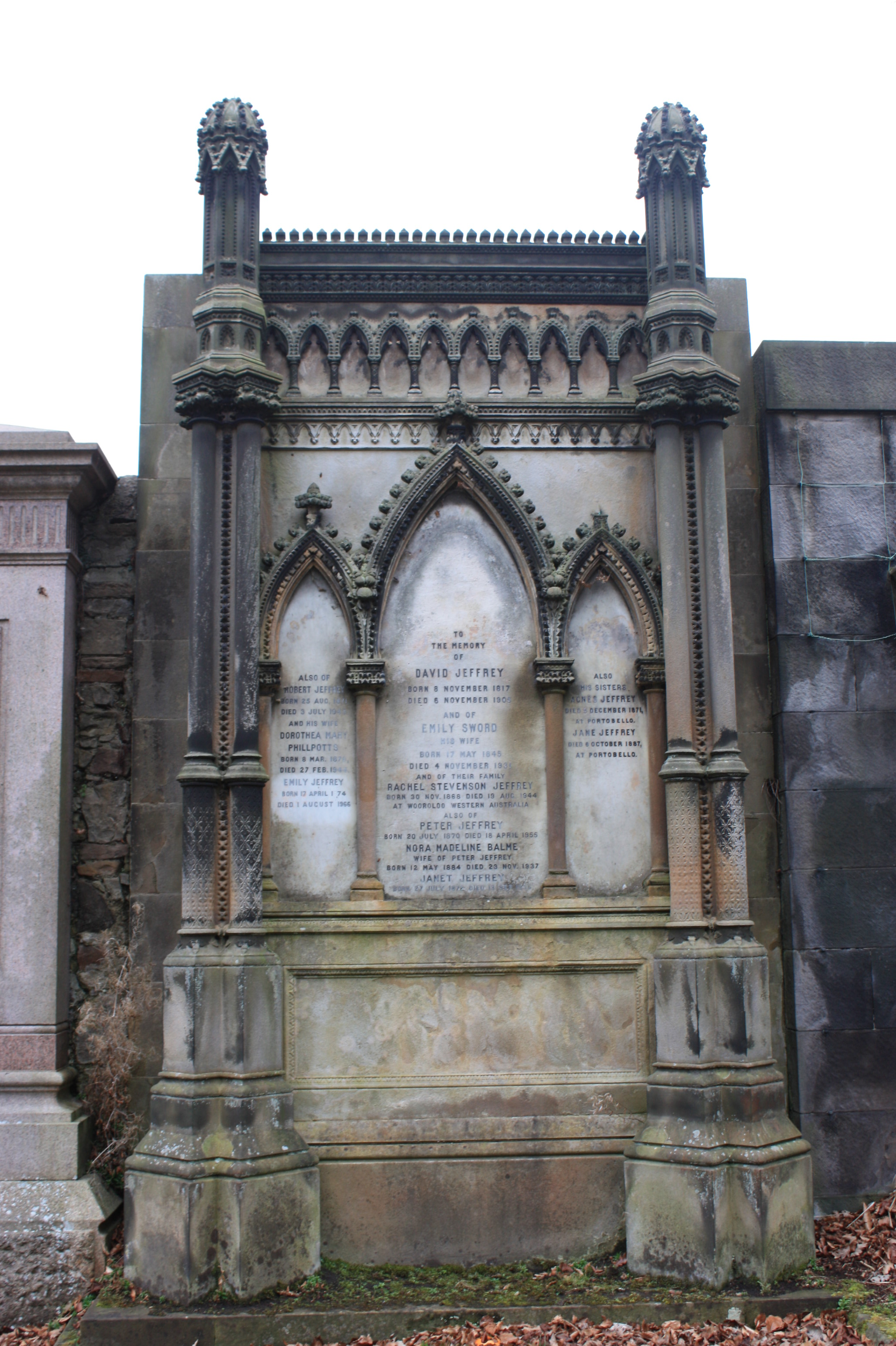
The gothic masterpiece to David Jeffrey (1817–1905), Dean Cemetery

The Dean Cemetery is a historically important Victorian cemetery north of the Dean Village, west of Edinburgh city centre, in Scotland. It lies between Queensferry Road and the Water of Leith, bounded on its east side by Dean Path and on its west by the Dean Gallery. A 20th-century extension lies detached from the main cemetery to the north of Ravelston Terrace. The main cemetery is accessible through the main gate on its east side, through a "grace and favour" access door from the grounds of Dean Gallery and from Ravelston Terrace. The modern extension is only accessible at the junction of Dean Path and Queensferry Road.

== The cemetery ==
Dean Cemetery, originally known as Edinburgh Western Cemetery, was laid out by David Cousin (an Edinburgh architect who also laid out Warriston Cemetery) in 1846 and was a fashionable burial ground for mainly the middle and upper-classes. The many monuments bear witness to Scottish achievement in peace and war, at home and abroad and are a rich source of Edinburgh and Victorian history.

As the cemetery plots were quickly bought up the cemetery was extended on its north side in 1871. A second set of entrance gates were built on Dean Path, matching the original entrance. Although this section was originally only accessed through this gate the extension was quickly linked to the original section by creating gaps in the mutual wall where no graves existed.

The separated section north of Ravelston Terrace (previously Edgehill Nursery) was purchased in 1877 in anticipation of a sales rate matching that of the original cemetery, but this was not to be, and the area only began to be used in 1909 (excepting John Ritchie Findlay (1898) alone for a decade). This section is relatively plain and generally unremarkable, but does include a line of Scottish judges against the north wall, perhaps trying to echo the "Lord's Row" against the west wall of the original cemetery. Whilst numerically greater in its number of lords it is far less eye-catching.

The entire cemetery is privately owned by the Dean Cemetery Trust Limited, making it one of the few cemeteries still run as it was intended to be run. The resultant layout, with its mature designed landscape, can be seen as an excellent example of a cemetery actually being visible in the form it was conceived to be seen.

The southern access from Belford Road is now blocked and the entrance road here is now grassed and used for the interment of ashes.

The cemetery contains sculpture by Sir John Steell, William Brodie, John Hutchison, Francis John Williamson, Pilkington Jackson, Amelia Robertson Hill, William Birnie Rhind, John Rhind, John Stevenson Rhind, William Grant Stevenson, Henry Snell Gamley, Charles McBride, George Frampton, Waller Hugh Paton and Stewart McGlashan.

== Dean House ==
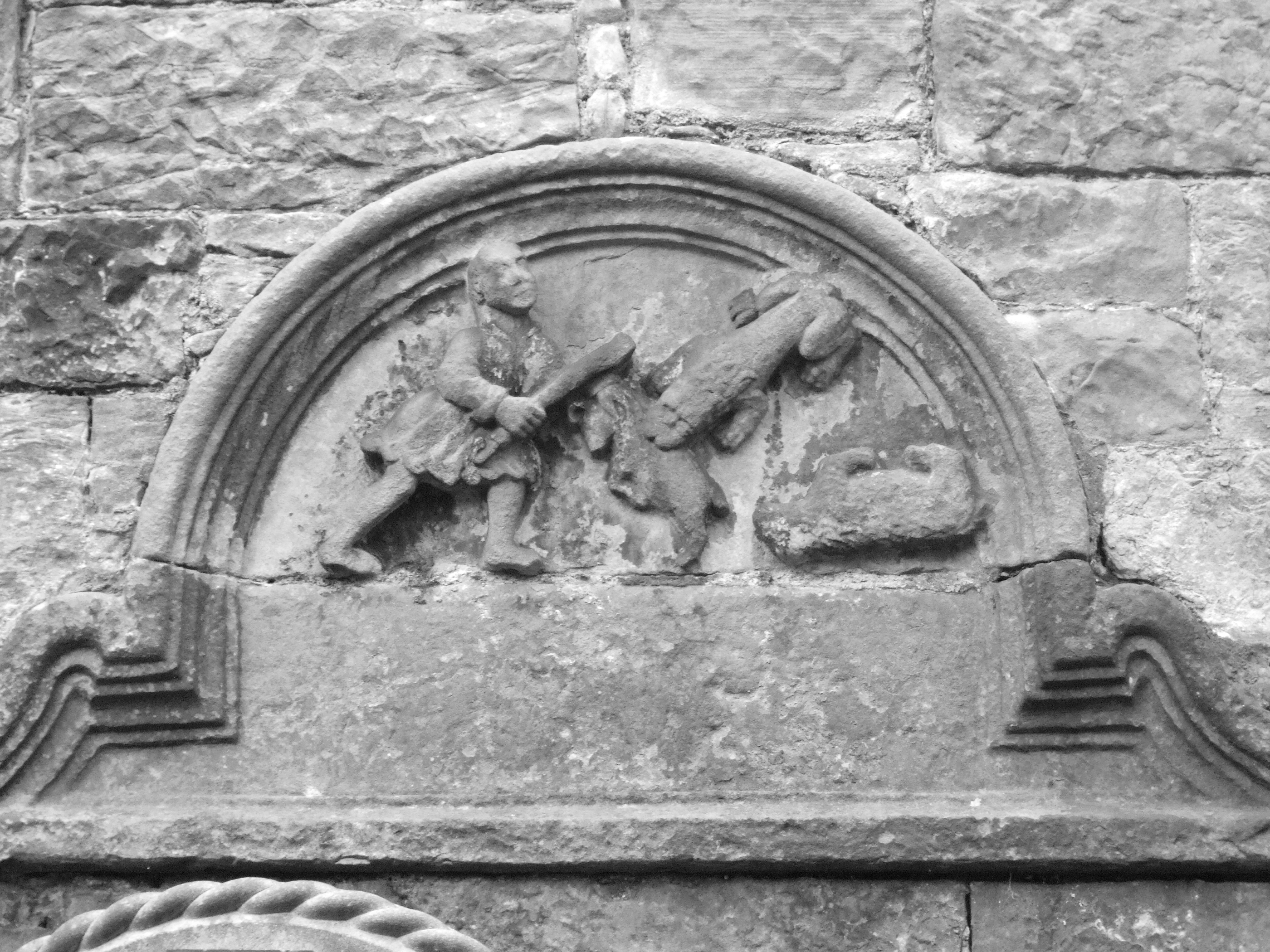
Stone carving from Dean House, now part of retaining wall in Dean Cemetery

The cemetery stands on the site of Dean House (built 1614), part of Dean Estate which had been purchased in 1609 by Sir William Nisbet, who became in 1616 Lord Provost of Edinburgh. The Nisbets of Dean held the office of Hereditary Poulterer to the King. The famous herald, Alexander Nisbet, of Nisbet House, near Duns, Scottish Borders, Berwickshire, is said to have written his Systems of Heraldry in Dean House. The estate house was demolished in 1845, and sculptured stones from it are incorporated into the south retaining wall supporting at the south side of the cemetery. This lower, hidden section also contains graves.

John Swinton, Lord Swinton died in the house in 1799. Sir John Stuart Hepburn Forbes was born in Dean House in 1804.

== Notable interments ==
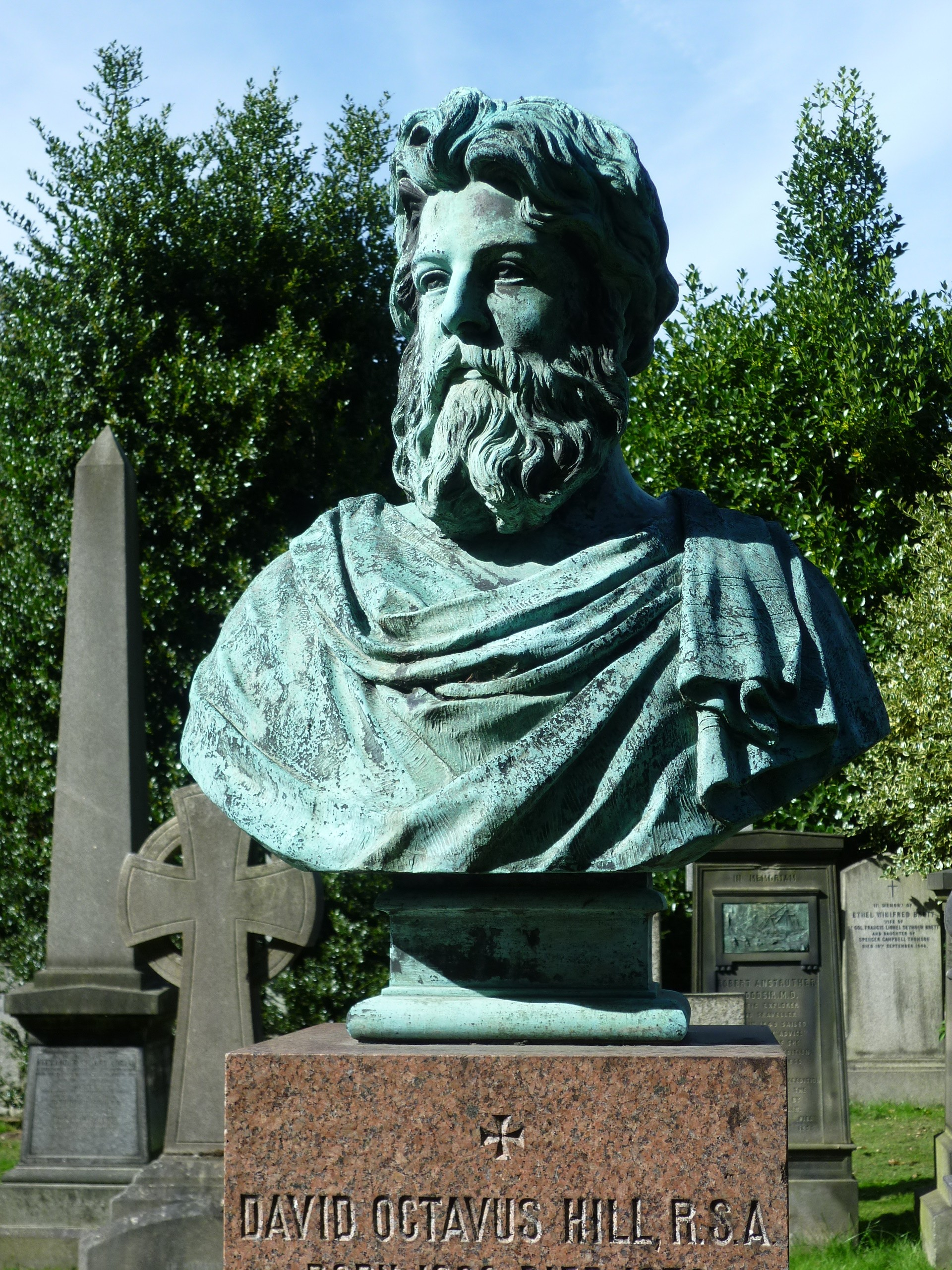
Bust of artist and photography pioneer David Octavius Hill, sculpted by his second wife

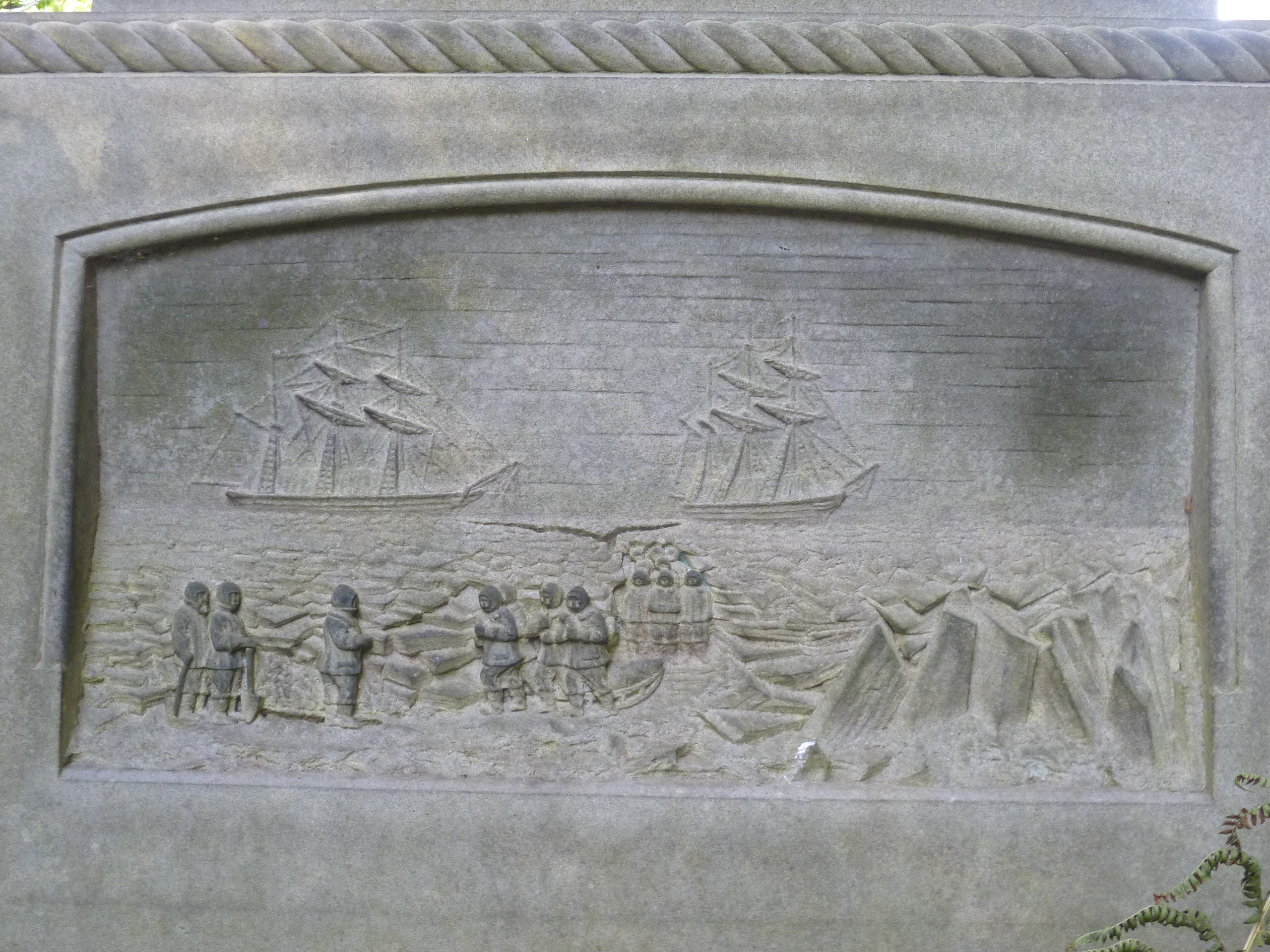
Relief on the gravestone of Lt. John Irving, who died on the Franklin Expedition

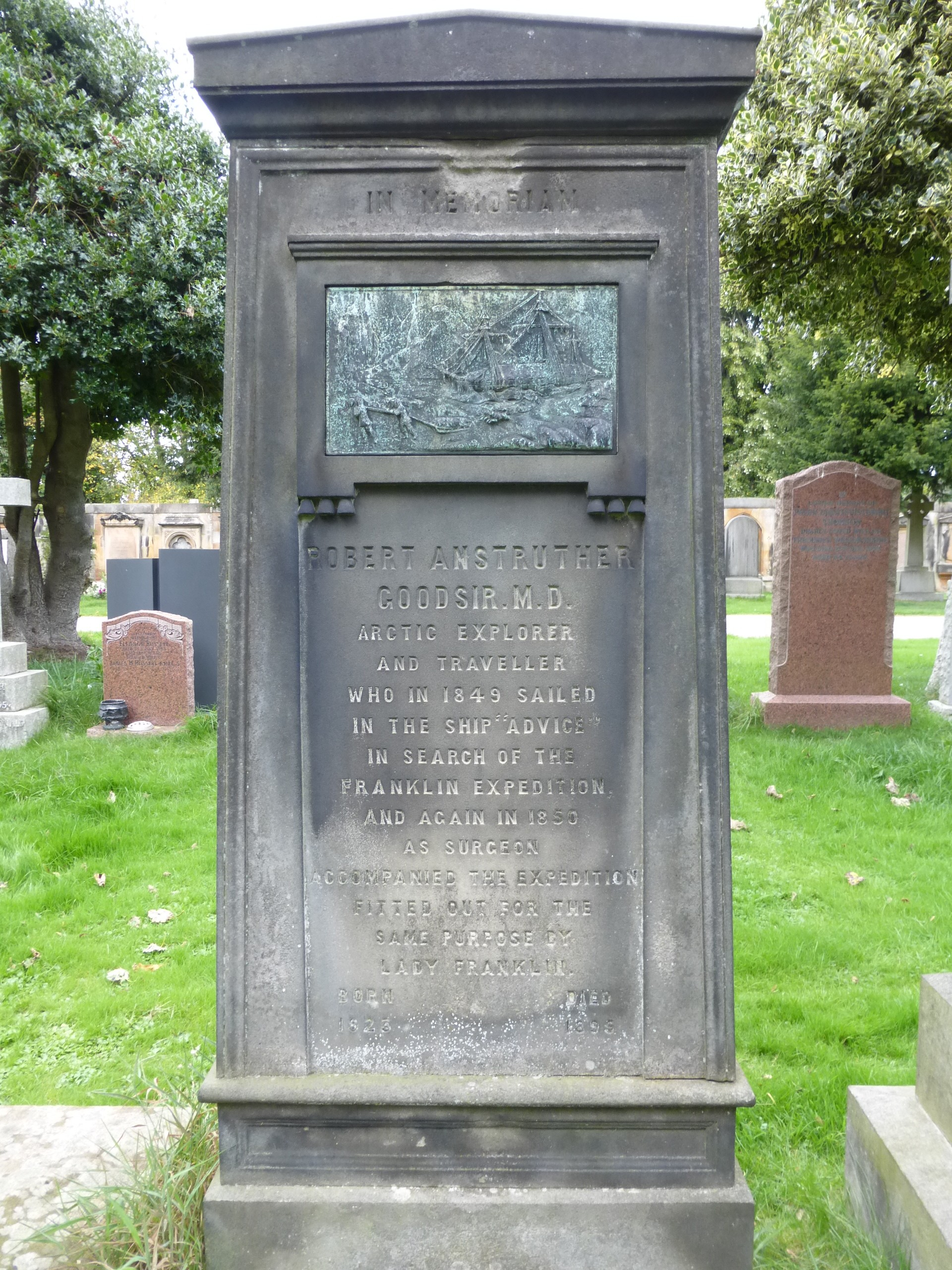
Grave of Arctic explorer and surgeon, Robert Anstruther Goodsir MD who joined the search for the Franklin Expedition

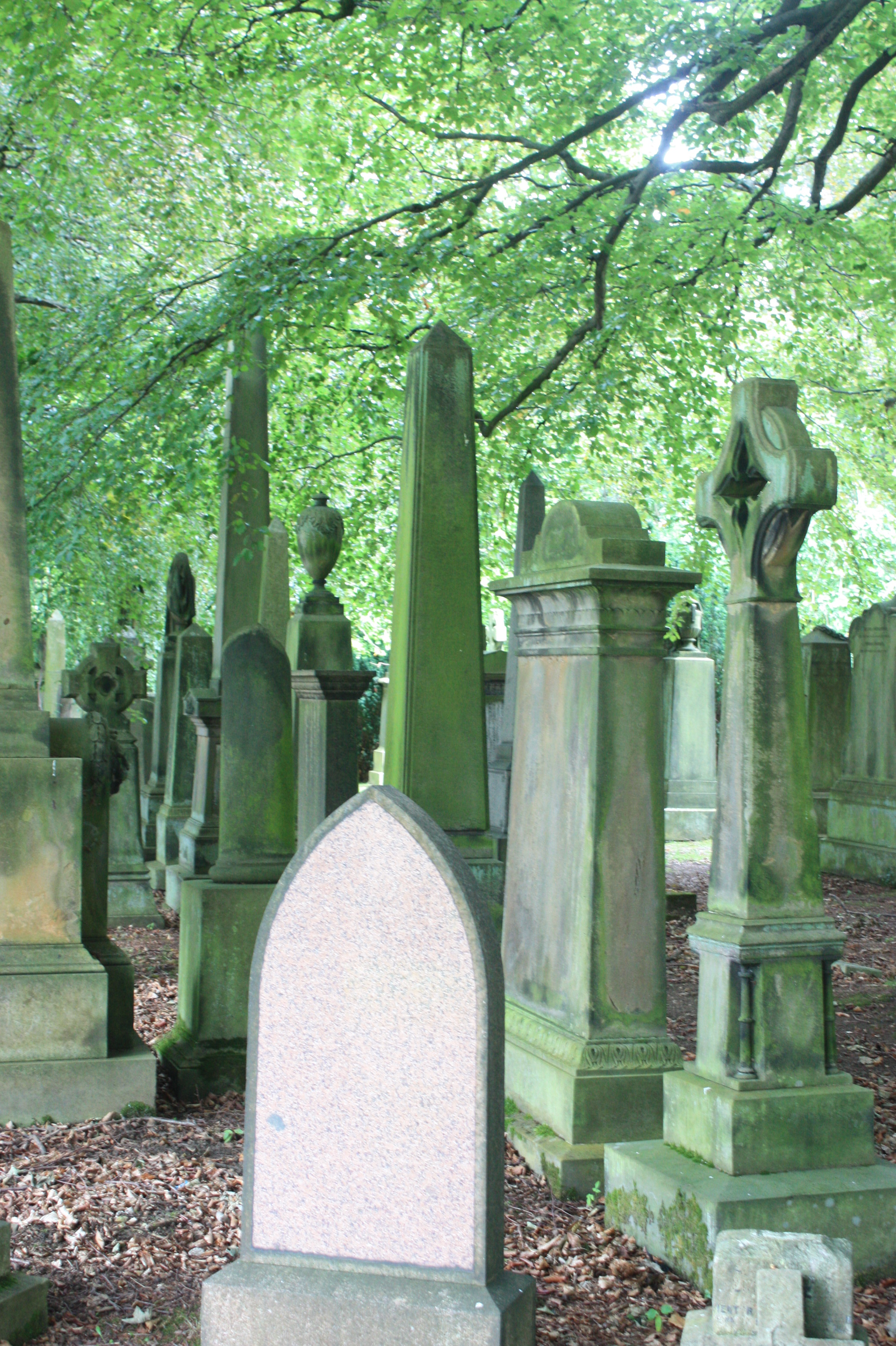
Internal section to NW, Dean Cemetery

=== Original cemetery ===
"N" denotes location in the first northern extension. "LR" denotes location in the Lords Row.

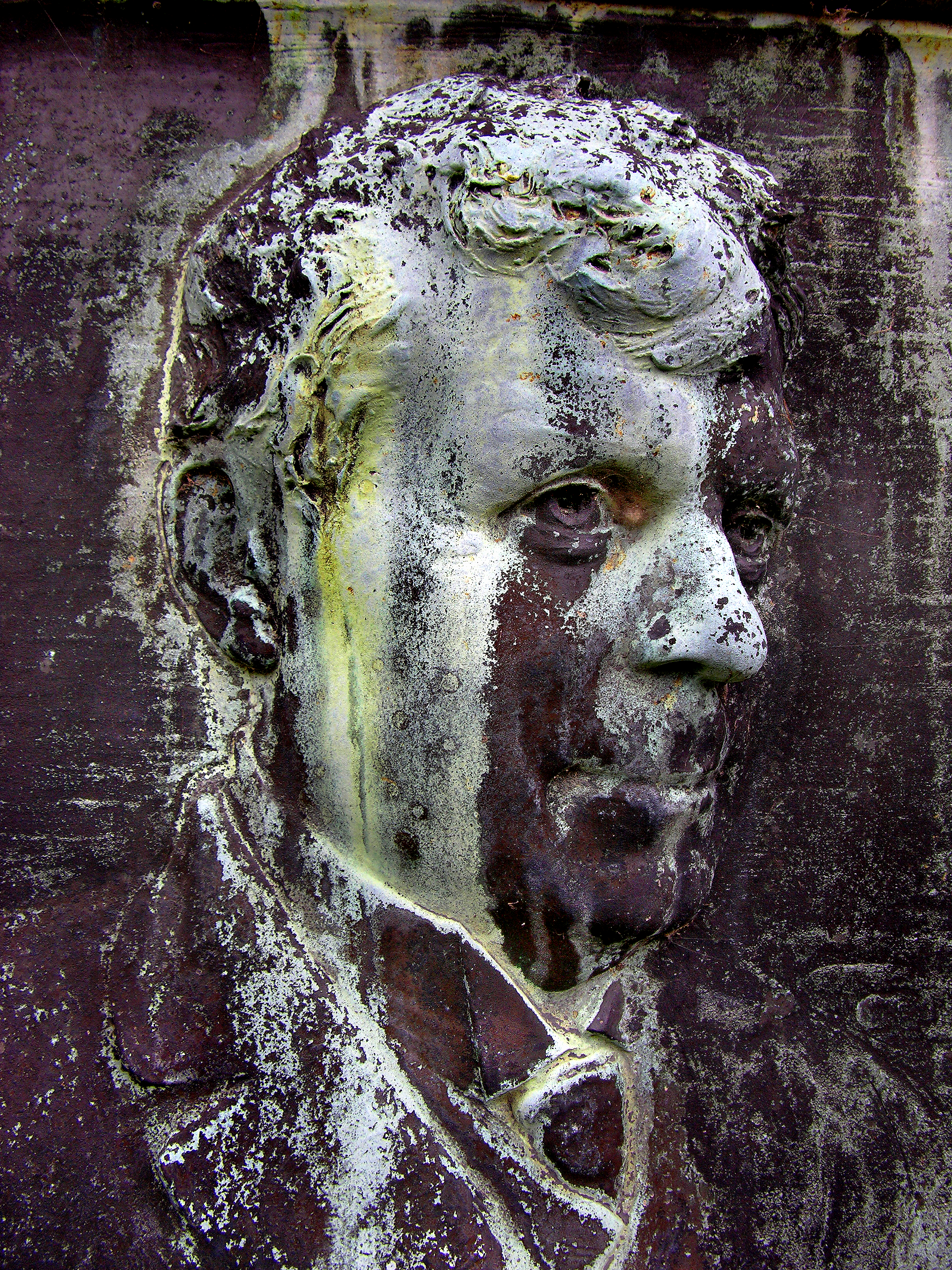
Will Thomson, Dean Cemetery extension

- The 5th Baron Abercromby (1841–1924)
- Lord Adam (1824–1914), Senator of the College of Justice (N)
- Sir James Ormiston Affleck (1840–1922), physician and author (N)
- Sir Stair Agnew (1831–1916)
- Rev David Aitken (1796–1875), church historian
- John Aitken (1793–1833), Scottish journalist and editor (LR)
- Robert Alexander (1840–1923), artist
- Sir Archibald Alison (d. 1867), advocate and historian, plus his son, Sir Archibald Alison (LR)
- Robert Allan (1806–1863), mineralogist
- Sir Robert George Allan (1879–1972), agriculturalist
- Major General William Allan (1832–1918), a general in the Crimean War
- Sir William Allan (1782–1850), artist
- John Anderson (1833–1900), sculpted by David Watson Stevenson
- Thomas Anderson (1832–1870), botanist
- Thomas Annandale (1838–1907), medical pioneer and surgeon (N)
- Neil Arnott Royal Society of London (1788–1874), physician
- Lena Ashwell, Lady Simson (1869–1957), English actress
- Prof William Edmondstoune Aytoun (1813–1865), poet
- Henry Bellyse Baildon (1849–1907), poet and author
- Dr John William Ballantyne (1861–1923), founder of the science of antenatal pathology
- William Francis Beattie (1886–1918), sculptor
- William Hamilton Beattie (1842–1898), architect (including Jenner's and the Balmoral Hotel)
- Dr John Beddoe (1826–1911), ethnologist
- Dr James Warburton Begbie (1826–1876), physician (N)
- Archibald Bell (1776–1854), author and advocate
- Dr Joseph Bell (1837–1911), lecturer at the medical school of the University of Edinburgh, personal surgeon of Queen Victoria
- John Bellany (1942–2013), artist
- Dr John Hughes Bennett (1812–1875), physiologist
- Isabella Bird, married name Bishop (1831–1904), traveller, writer and photographer. First female Fellow of the Royal Geographical Society (RGS)
- Alexander Black (1797–1858), architect
- Alexander William Black MP (1859–1906)
- Rev. James Black (d. 1948), Moderator of the General Assembly of the Church of Scotland in 1938 and Chaplain to the King
- Robert Blackburn, Lord Blackburn (1864–1944), Senator of the College of Justice (N)
- John Stuart Blackie (1809–1895)
- John Blackwood (1818–1879), publisher and editor of Blackwood's Edinburgh Magazine
- Rev Dr Robert Blair (1837–1907) (N)
- Thomas Bonnar (father (d. 1873) and son (d. 1896), a back-to-back monument by David Watson Stevenson), artists, decorators and designers
- Cunninghame Borthwick, 19th Lord Borthwick (1813–1885)
- Sir Thomas Bouch (1822–1880), railway engineer, designer of the original Tay Rail Bridge
- Samuel Bough, artist, (1822–1878) (monument by William Brodie, 1879)
- Admiral James Paterson Bower (1806–1889) and his son Major General Hamilton St Clair Bower (1858–1940) (N)
- Prof Francis Darby Boyd (1866–1922), Professor of Clinical Medicine at Edinburgh University
- Mary Syme Boyd (1910–1997), sculptor
- Sir Thomas Jamieson Boyd (1818–1902), Lord Provost of Edinburgh 1877–82 (N)
- Sir Byrom Bramwell (1847–1921), brain surgeon
- Edwin Bramwell (1873–1952), brain surgeon (N)
- Sir John Clerk Brodie (1811–1888), monument by John Hutchison (including his son Thomas Dawson Brodie) (LR)
- William Brodie (1815–1881)
- Agnes Henderson Brown (1866–1943), suffragette
- Andrew Betts Brown (1841–1906), engineer and inventor, co-founder of Brown Brothers & Co (N)
- James Buchanan and Jane Buchanan, philanthropists
- John Young Buchanan (1844–1925), oceanographer
- Thomas Stuart Burnett (1853–1888), sculptor
- Dr John Graham MacDonald Burt (1809–1868), President of the Royal College of Physicians of Edinburgh
- Samuel Butcher (1850–1910), professor of Greek at Edinburgh University, President of the British Academy, Liberal Unionist MP for Cambridge University (N)
- Florence St John Cadell (1877–1966), artist (N)
- Francis Cadell (1883–1937), Scottish colourist, his actress sister Jean Cadell (1884–1967) and great-nephew, comedy actor Simon Cadell (1950–1996), star of Enemy at the Door and Hi-de-Hi!
- Prof Francis Mitchell Caird (1853–1926), President of the Royal College of Surgeons of Edinburgh 1912–14 (N)
- Edward and James Key Caird, Dundee jute barons and philanthropists
- Major Donald Fraser Callander (1918–1992), soldier
- General Sir John Campbell of the East India Company
- Richard Vary Campbell (1840–1901), legal author (N)
- James Carswell (1832–1897), civil engineer, designer of Queen Street Station, Glasgow, and the approaches to the Forth Rail Bridge (N)
- James Cassie RSA (1819–1879), artist (N)
- Sir David Patrick Chalmers (1835–1899), colonial judge (N)
- George Paul Chalmers (1838–1878), artist
- Robert Chambers (1832–1888), publisher of dictionaries and encyclopedia
- Prof John Chiene (1843–1923), surgeon
- Henry Martyn Clark (1887–1916), missionary
- Lord Cockburn (1779–1854)
- John Campbell Colquhoun (1803–1870), writer
- George Somervil Carfrae (1854–1934), civil engineer (N)
- Dr John G. S. Coghill (1834–1899), physician and medical author
- George Combe (1788–1858), lawyer and phrenologist
- Charles Alfred Cooper (1829–1916), editor of The Scotsman newspaper
- Sir Joseph Montagu Cotterill (1851–1933), surgeon and cricketer, son of Henry Cotterill
- Rev George Coventry (1791–1872), (LR)
- Lord Cowan (1798–1878), Senator of the College of Justice (LR)
- Robert Cox (1810–1872), medallion head by William Brodie
- Robert Cox MP (1845–1899)
- Sir James Coxe (1811–1878), psychiatrist, Commissioner in Lunacy for Scotland
- Dr Kenneth Craik (1914–1945)
- Francis Chalmers Crawford (1851–1908), botanist
- Rev Prof Thomas Jackson Crawford (1812–1875), theologian and author
- Robert Croall (1831–1898), coach- and post-master
- Prof John Halliday Croom (1847–1923), physician
- Lord Cullen (1859–1931)
- Prof Daniel John Cunningham (1850–1909) with his Dublin-born son, General Sir Alan Cunningham (1887–1983)
- Robert James Blair Cunynghame (1841–1903), forensic scientist and physiologist
- Allen Dalzell (1821–1869), pharmacologist
- Dr Robert Daun (1785–1871), military surgeon (LR)
- Marcus Dods (1834–1909), theologian
- Dr Andrew Halliday Douglas (1819–1908), President of the Royal College of Physicians of Edinburgh, and his namesake son, Rev. Prof. A.H. Douglas (d. 1902), author and Professor of Apologetic at Know College, Toronto
- Francis Brown Douglas DL (1814–1885), Lord Provost of Edinburgh 1859–62
- Sir William Fettes Douglas (1822–1891), PRSA artist
- Bishop John Dowden (1840–1910), Bishop of Edinburgh
- Thomas Drybrough (1820–1894), brewer
- Finlay Dun (1795–1853), musician and composer
- John Duncan (surgeon) (1839–1899), President of the Royal College of Surgeons of Edinburgh 1889–91
- Henry Dunlop of Craigton (1799–1867), Lord Provost of Glasgow 1837 to 1840
- James Dunsmure (1814–1886), President of the Royal College of Surgeons of Edinburgh
- William Ronald Dodds Fairbairn (1889–1964), psychiatrist
- Dr James Duncan (1810–1866) and his son, Dr John Duncan (1839–1899)
- James Faed (1821–1911), artist
- Rev Valentine Faithfull (1820–1894), clergyman and cricketer
- Sir James Falshaw (1810–1889), Lord Provost (N)
- Vice Admiral Charles Fellowes (1823–1880) (N)
- James Haig Ferguson (1863–1934), President of both the Royal College of Physicians of Edinburgh and the Royal College of Surgeons of Edinburgh (N)
- Richard Findlay (1943–2017), broadcaster and media magnate
- Rev Robert Howie Fisher (1861–1934), minister and author, Chaplain to the King
- Lord Fleming (1877–1944), military hero and judge
- James Simpson Fleming (1828–1899)
- Prof John Fleming (1785–1857)
- Prof Edward Forbes (1815–1854), naturalist
- Prof James David Forbes (1809–1868), inventor of the seismometer
- Sir Patrick Johnston Ford, Baronet, MP (1880–1945)
- Major-General James George Roche Forlong (1824–1904), soldier and engineer
- Sir John Forrest, Baronet (1817–1883), with Sir William Forrest (1823–1894) and Sir James Forrest (1853–1899)
- William Hope Fowler (1876–1933), x-ray pioneer, victim of his own experiments (N)
- Sir Andrew Henderson Leith Fraser (1848–1919)
- Dr John Fraser (1844–1925), Commissioner of Lunacy in Scotland 1895–1910
- Lord Fraser (1817–1889), jurist
- Patrick Neill Fraser, (d. 1905), botanist (plus a cenotaph to his daughter Margaret Neill Fraser, buried in Serbia during the First World War)
- Thomas Richard Fraser (1841–1920), pathologist (N)
- Sir William Fraser (1816–1898)
- Henry Snell Gamley (1865–1928), artist
- George Alexander Gibson (1854–1913), doctor and amateur geologist, Fellow of the Royal Society of Edinburgh, Chief Physician at Edinburgh Royal Infirmary (N)
- Sir James Gibson, 1st Baronet (1849–1912), Lord Provost of Edinburgh 1906–1909, MP for Edinburgh 1909–1912
- James Young Gibson (1826–1886), author/translator (bronze by Francis John Williamson) plus his wife Margaret Dunlop Smith (1843–1920), also an author
- John Goodsir (1814–1867), anatomist
- Robert Anstruther Goodsir (1823–1899), doctor and Arctic explorer
- Edward Gordon, Baron Gordon of Drumearn (1814–1879)
- Sir Alexander Grant, 10th Bt. (1826–1884), educationalist and Principal of Edinburgh University
- John Peter Grant, MP (1774–1848)
- Sir Ludovic Grant, 11th Baronet of Dalvey (1862–1836)
- Robert Kaye Greville (1794–1866), botanist
- Lord Guthrie (1849–1920), Senator of the College of Justice
- William Guy, (1860–1950), pioneer of modern dentistry
- Daniel Rutherford Haldane (1824–1887)
- James Haliburton (1788–1862), Egyptologist
- James, 9th Baron Belhaven and Stenton (1822–1893), monument including a bronze by Pilkington Jackson
- Lord Handyside (1798–1858)
- Joseph James Hargrave (1841–1894) of the Hudson's Bay Company (HBC)
- John Harrison (1847–1922), master tailor and author, son of Sir George Harrison, MP
- Sir Lewis John Erroll Hay, 9th Baronet of Park (1866–1923) (N)
- Andrew Fergus Hewat, (1884–1957)
- David Octavius Hill (1802–1870), artist and photography pioneer, Hill & Adamson. The monument is by his second wife, Amelia Robertson Hill (née Paton) (1820–1904) who is buried with him
- Sir James Hodsdon (1858–1928), surgeon, President of the Royal College of Surgeons of Edinburgh 1914–1917
- Franklin Hudson (1864–1918), American-born osteopath (N)
- Robert Gemmell Hutchison (1855–1936), artist (pair of sculpted heads by John Stevenson Rhind)
- Sir Thomas Hutchison (1866–1925), Lord Provost of Edinburgh 1921–1923
- Elsie Inglis (1864–1917), pioneer female doctor and war hero (N)
- Alexander Taylor Innes (1833–1912), lawyer and historian
- John Irving (1822–1848 or 49), lieutenant aboard HMS Terror, part of the Franklin Expedition searching for the Northwest Passage; his body was found on King William Island (in modern-day Nunavut, Canada) 30 years later and re-interred at Dean Cemetery, 7 November 1881 (monument is carved by Stewart McGlashan)
- Sir William Allan Jamieson (1839–1916), surgeon and medical author, President of the Royal College of Physicians of Edinburgh 1908–1910
- Francis, Lord Jeffrey (1773–1850) (LR)
- Charles Jenner (1810–1893), founder of Jenners Department Store on Princes Street
- Lord Johnston (1844–1931), Senator of the College of Justice (N)
- Sir William Campbell Johnston (1860–1938), advocate and cricketer (N)
- Artur Jurand (1914–2000), Polish born geneticist (N)
- Frederick Charles Kennedy (1849–1916), Director of the Irrawaddy Flotilla Company and involved in the Third Anglo-Burmese War (N)
- Helen Kerr (1859–1940), social reformer
- The Baron Kilpatrick of Kincraig (1926–2015)
- The 1st Baron Kinnear (1833–1917)
- Charles Kinnear, architect (1830–1894) of the firm Peddie & Kinnear, creators of Cockburn Street, Edinburgh, etc. (N)
- All four Barons Kinross, spanning almost two centuries (LR)
- John Watson Laidlay (1808–1885), coin collector and orientalist
- William Law (1799–1878), Lord Provost of Edinburgh from 1869 to 1872
- Right Hon Lord Lee (1830–1890), Senator of the College of Justice (N)
- Rev Cameron Lees (1835–1913)
- James Leslie (1801–1889), engineer, and his son, Alexander Leslie
- John Lessels (1808–1883), City architect (N)
- David Lind (1797–1856), builder of the Scott Monument
- Dr William Lauder Lindsay (1829–1880), physician and botanist
- Prof Sir Henry Duncan Littlejohn (1826–1914), public health promoter, forensic science pioneer, plus his son, Henry Harvey Littlejohn (1862–1927), forensic scientist, Edinburgh's first Police Surgeon.
- John Gordon Lorimer (1870–1916), cenotaph
- George MacRitchie Low, FFA (1849–1922), President of the Faculty of Actuaries (N)
- Flora Macaulay (1859–1958), newspaper editor (N)
- Charles McBride (1851–1903), sculptor (bronze head by Henry Snell Gamley) (N)
- John MacGregor McCandlish (1821–1901), first President of the Faculty of Actuaries
- Dr John McCosh (1801–1881), early photographer (cenotaph) (N)
- Major-General Sir Hector MacDonald (d. 1903), "The Fighting Mac" (bronze by William Birnie Rhind) (N)
- Rev Prof Patrick Campbell MacDougall (1806–1867), Professor of Moral Philosophy
- John McEwan (1832–1875), part of the brewing family
- Rev. Alexander Robertson MacEwen (1851–1916)
- Lord Macfadyen (1945–2008), Senator of the College of Justice
- Dr John Lisle Hall MacFarlane (1851–1874), physician and Scotland rugby international (medallion by Sir John Steell)
- David MacGibbon (1831–1902), architect and architectural historian, partner in MacGibbon and Ross (N)
- Archibald Donald Mackenzie (1914–1944), 'Captain Mack', officer of the Cameron Highlanders and later of the Brigata Stella Rossa, commemorated annually on Liberation Day in Italy
- Thomas Mackenzie, Lord Mackenzie (1807–1869), Senator of the College of Justice
- Rev Dugald Mackichan (1851–1932)
- Andrew Douglas Maclagan (1817–1900), physician and toxicologist, and his son Robert Craig Maclagan
- David Maclagan (1785–1865) military surgeon, surgeon to Queen Victoria in Scotland
- Rev Norman Macleod DD (1838–1911) Moderator of the General Assembly of the Church of Scotland in 1900 (N)
- Donald Mackenzie (1818–1875), Scottish judge, styled Lord Mackenzie
- Rev Hugh MacMillan (1833–1903) (N)
- Sir Daniel Macnee (1806–1882) artist and President of the Royal Scottish Academy (N)
- Rev Dr James Calder Macphail (1821–1908) Free Church minister and pioneer photographer (N)
- Robert McVitie (1854–1910) biscuit maker, creator of the digestive biscuit (N) (cenotaph)
- James Maidment (1793–1879) antiquarian (N)
- David Duncan Main (1856–1934) medical missionary
- Edward Maitland, Lord Barcaple (1803–1870)
- Dr Robert Bowes Malcolm (1807–1894) British obstetrician
- Henry Marshall (1775–1851) physician and medical statistician
- Rev Theodore Marshall (1846–1939), Moderator of the General Assembly of the Church of Scotland 1908 (N)
- Robert Matheson (architect) (1808–1877)
- John Miller (1805–1883) half of the partnership Grainger & Miller, railway and dock engineers
- Rev John Harry Miller (1869–1940) (N)
- Janet Milne Rae (1844–1933), novelist
- Rev James Mitchell (1830–1911) Moderator of the General Assembly of the Church of Scotland in 1901
- Rev John Murray Mitchell (1815–1904) missionary and orientalist (N)
- Rev Reginald Mitchell-Innes (1848–1930)
- Sir Mitchell Mitchell-Thomson, 1st Baronet (1816–1918) Lord Provost of Edinburgh 1897–1900
- James Moncreiff, 1st Baron Moncreiff (1811-1895) Scottish judge and politician
- Alexander Monro (tertius) (1773–1859) physician of the Monro dynasty (LR)
- James Francis Montgomery (1818–1897) first Dean of St Mary's Episcopal Cathedral
- Dr Charles Morehead (1807–1882)
- William Ambrose Morehead (1805–1863) governor of Madras
- Thomas Corsan Morton (1859–1928) artist
- Rev Dr William Muir (1787–1869) Scottish divine and theological author. Moderator of the General Assembly of the Church of Scotland in 1838 (bronze head by Sir John Steell)
- James Muirhead (1830–1889) Professor of Civil Law at Edinburgh University
- David Mure, Lord Mure (1810–1891) judge
- Sir John Murray (oceanographer) (d. 1914) leader of the Challenger Expedition (N)
- Robert Milne Murray (1855–1904) gynaecologist
- James Nasmyth (1808–1890), inventor of the steam hammer, monument by John Rhind (N)
- Robert Nasmyth (1792–1870) dentist to Queen Victoria
- Dr Thomas Goodall Nasmyth (1855–1937) Medical Officer of Health to Fife, medical author (N)
- Patrick Newbigging (1813–1864)
- Rev Dr Robert Nisbet (1814–1874)
- Wilfrid Normand, Baron Normand (1884–1962) (N)
- Brownlow North (evangelist) (1810–1875)
- Rev James Nicoll Ogilvie (1860–1928) Moderator of the General Assembly of the Church of Scotland in 1918.
- Emily Murray Paterson (1855–1934), artist
- James Paterson (1854–1932) artist
- Sir James Balfour Paul (1846–1931) (N)
- Charles Pearson, Lord Pearson (1843–1910) judge
- John More Dick Peddie (1853–1921) architect (N)
- Samuel Peploe (1871–1935) artist
- Arthur Perigal (1784–1847) artist
- Alexander Mactier Pirrie (1882–1907) anthropologist (N)
- William Henry Playfair (1790–1857), architect
- Olive Rae (1878–1933), operatic soprano
- Rev Robert Rainy (1820–1906) and his son Adam Rolland Rainy MP
- Prof Sir John Rankine (1846–1922) professor of Scots Law and legal author (N)
- Robert Reid (architect) (1774–1856) architect of much of the New Town
- Robert Carstairs Reid (1845–1894) civil engineer
- John Riddell (genealogist) (1785–1862)
- Rev Dr George Ritchie (1808–1888) Moderator of the General Assembly of the Church of Scotland in 1870
- John Ritchie (1778–1870) and John Ritchie Findlay (1824–1898) newspaper tycoons
- Dr Robert Peel Ritchie (1835–1902) medical historian
- Joseph Robertson (1810–1866), antiquarian
- Alexander Ignatius Roche (1861–1921) artist
- Prof Henry Darwin Rogers (1808–1866) US-born geologist
- A red granite obelisk to Alexander Russel, editor of The Scotsman (1814–1870) (N)
- Alexander James Russell (1814–1887) lawyer
- Sir James Russell (1846–1918) Lord Provost of Edinburgh 1891–94
- Rev James Curdie Russell DD (1830–1925) Moderator of the General Assembly of the Church of Scotland 1902 (N)
- Prof William Russell (physician) (1852–1940) discoverer of Russell bodies
- Andrew Rutherfurd, Lord Rutherfurd (1791–1852), designed by the adjacent Playfair
- Prof William Rutherford Sanders (1828–1881) pathologist
- Rev Dr Arcibald Scott (1837–1909) Moderator of the Church of Scotland in 1896
- David Scott (painter) (1807–1849)
- Andrew Edward Scougal (1846–1916) chief inspector of schools
- William Seller (1798–1869) physician and botanist
- Patrick Shaw (legal writer) (1796–1872)
- Charles Shore, 2nd Baron Teignmouth (1796–1885) politician
- Brigadier General Offley Shore (1863–1922)
- Sir Henry John Forbes Simson (1872–1932) the obstetrician who delivered Queen Elizabeth II and Princess Margaret (N)
- John Sinclair, 1st Baron Pentland (1860–1925)
- Basil Skinner (1923–1995) historian and campaigner for architectural conservation
- Robert T. Skinner (1867–1946) historian and teacher
- Prof George Gregory Smith (1865–1932)
- Dr John Smith (1800–1879) President of the Royal College of Physicians of Edinburgh
- Robert MacKay Smith (1802–1888) meteorologist and philanthropist
- Dr John W. L. Spence (1870–1930) x-ray pioneer and martyr to radiology
- Sir James Steel (1830–1904) Lord Provost of Edinburgh (bust by John Stevenson Rhind) (N)
- David Stevenson (1815–1886), his son Charles Alexander Stevenson (1855–1950) (N) and grandson D. Alan Stevenson (1891–1971) (N), lighthouse engineers
- Flora Stevenson (1839–1905) social reformer
- Louisa Stevenson (1835–1908) women's university education, women's suffrage
- James Stevenson (merchant) (1786–1866) Paisley cotton manufacturer
- John James Stevenson (1831–1908) architect, son of above
- Rev Robert Horne Stevenson (1812–1816)
- John Stewart of Nateby Hall (1813–1867) naturalist
- Prof Sir Thomas Grainger Stewart (1837–1900) and his daughter Agnes Grainger Stewart
- William Stewart, Lord Allanbridge (1925–2012)
- James Stirling (1800–1876) railway engineer and his wife, the author Susan Stirling
- William James Stuart (1873–1958) President of the Royal College of Surgeons of Edinburgh 1937 to 1939 (N)
- Gabriel Surenne FSA (1777–1858) historian
- Lt Gen Thomas Robert Swinburne British army officer and artist
- George Swinton (botanist) (1780–1854) Chief Secretary of the Government in India
- Major General Sir John Munro Sym (1839–1919)
- Francis Darby Syme (1818–1871) trader in China involved in the coolie riots of 1852
- John Tait (1787–1856) architect
- Rev C W G Taylor (d. 1950) Moderator of the General Assembly of the Church of Scotland 1942
- Robert Tennent (1813–1890), pioneer photographer and his younger brother Hugh Lyon Tennent (1817–1874) (N)
- D'Arcy Wentworth Thompson (1860–1947) biologist
- Prof Allen Thomson (1809–1884)
- Rev Dr Andrew Thomson (1814–1901) minister and religious author (N)
- Lt Col Frank Wyville Thomson (1860–1918) public health expert in India
- Sir Frederick Thomson, 1st Baronet MP (1875–1935) and Sir Douglas Thomson, 2nd Baronet MP (1905–1972) politician father and son
- Henry Alexis Thomson (1863–1924) Professor of Surgery
- Robert William Thomson (1822–1873) engineer and inventor of the pneumatic tyre
- Thomas Thomson (advocate) (1768–1852)
- Prof William Thomson (1802–1852), medical author, professor of medicine at the University of Glasgow
- Sir William Turner (anatomist) (1852–1916) and his son Arthur Logan Turner (1865–1939) (N)
- Dr Charles Edward Underhill (1856–1917) surgeon
- William Veitch (1794–1885) classical scholar
- Major General James Conway Victor (1792–1864) military engineer
- John Waddell (1828–1888) railway engineer
- Sir Norman Walker (1862–1942), dermatologist
- Edward Arthur Walton (1860–1922) artist
- Thomas Drummond Wanliss (1830–1923) Australian politician
- Sir Patrick Heron Watson (1831–1907) Crimean War surgeon, Surgeon to the King (Scotland), first President of the Edinburgh Dental Hospital

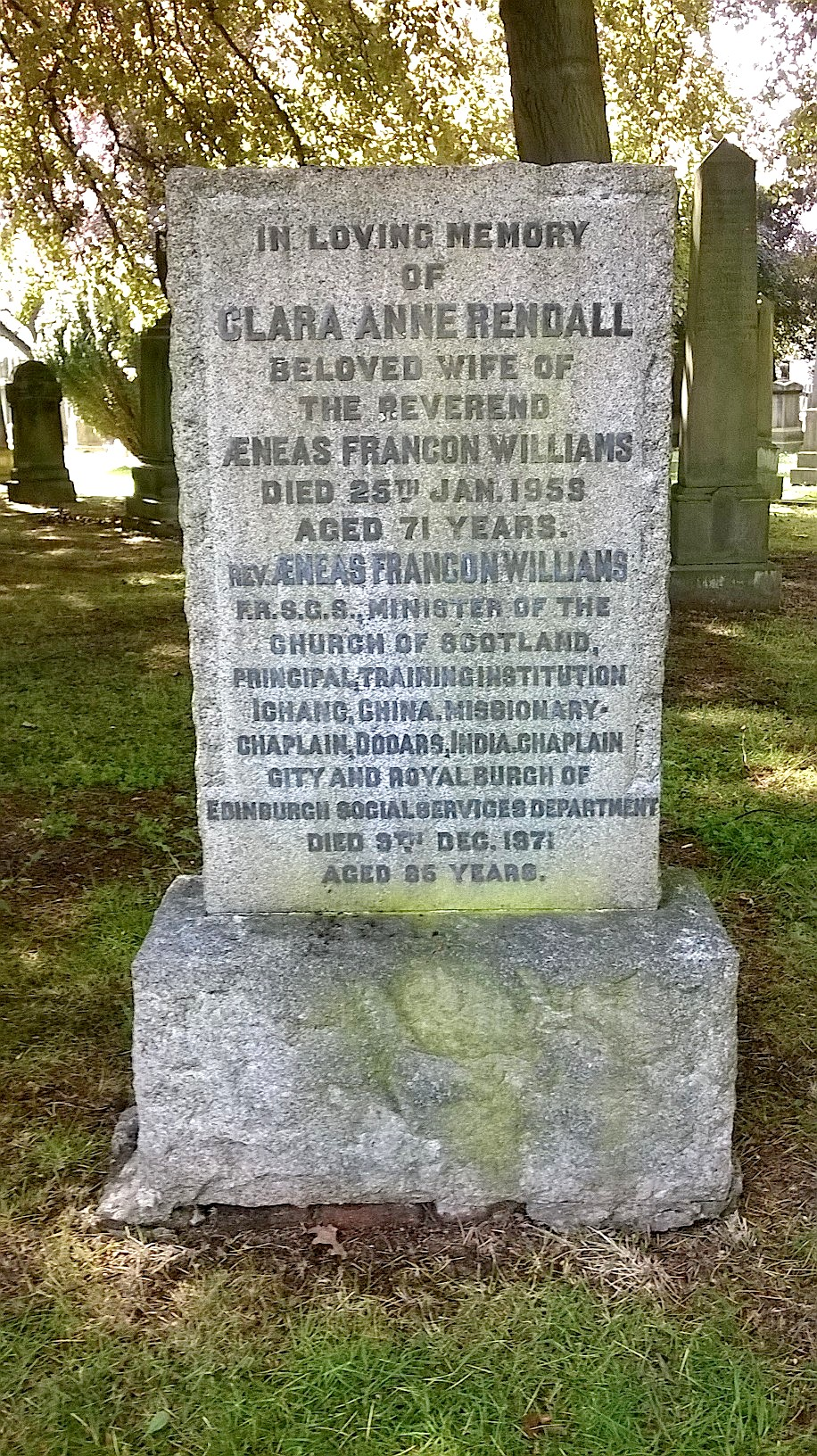
Aeneas Francon Williams and Clara Anne Rendall, Dean Cemetery, Edinburgh

- William Watson, Baron Watson (1827–1899) law lord
- Joseph Laing Waugh (1868–1928) author (medallion by William Birnie Rhind)
- Rev Dr Alexander Whyte (1836–1921) (N)
- Sir David Wilkie (1882–1938) surgeon and philanthropist
- Sir Henry Wellwood-Moncreiff, 10th Baronet (1809–1883)
- Aeneas Francon Williams (1886–1971) Church of Scotland Minister, Missionary, Chaplain, Writer and Poet, and his wife Clara Anne Rendall, missionary, teacher and artist.
- Rev Andrew Wallace Williamson (1856–1926)
- John Wilson (1800–1849) Scottish vocalist
- Prof John Wilson (1785–1854) author under the name of "Christopher North" and his brother James Wilson (1795–1856) a zoologist
- Dr Jenny Wormald (1942–2015) historian
- David Reginald Younger VC (memorial only)

=== Southern Terrace ===
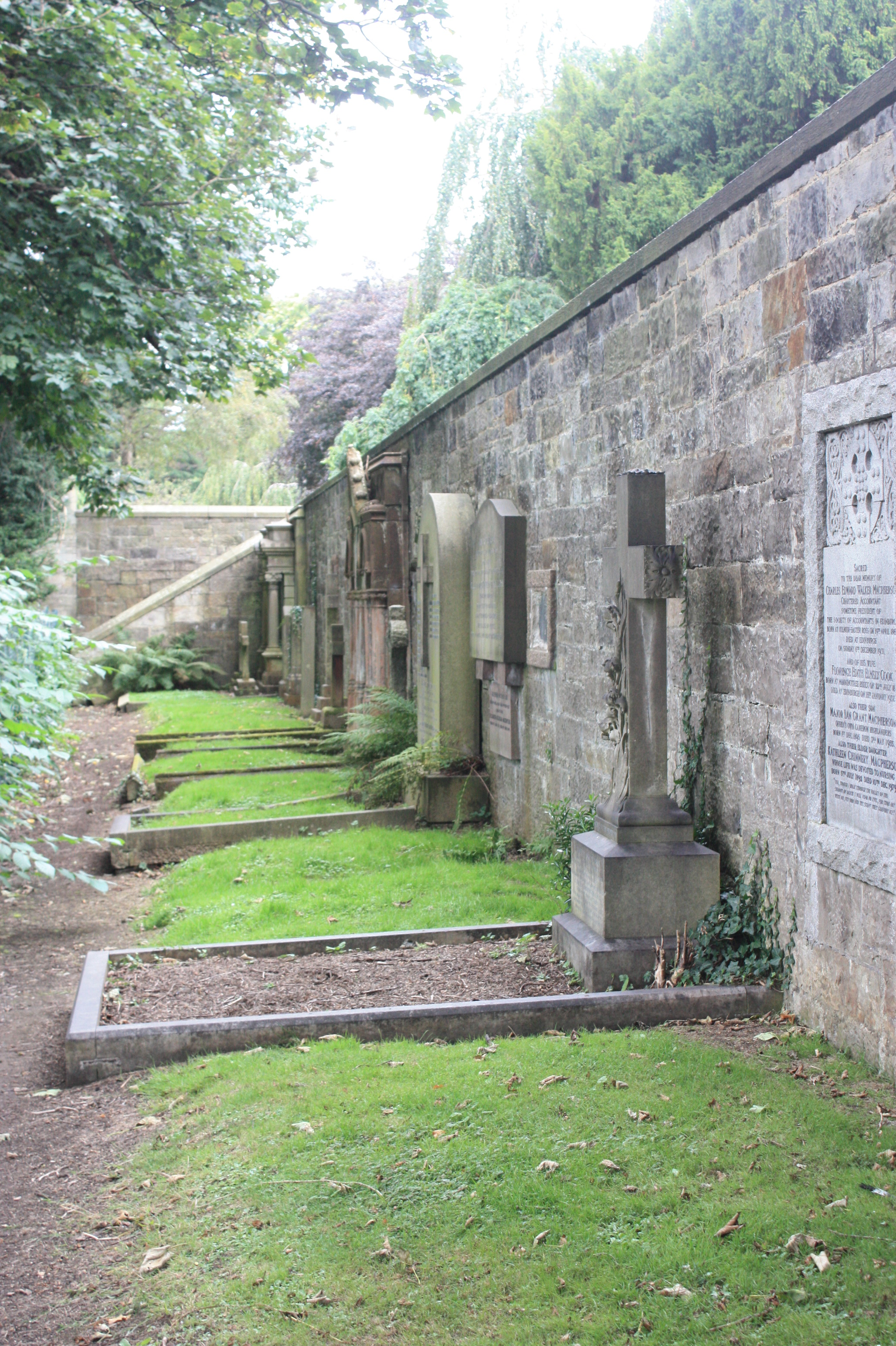
Dean Cemetery, south terrace

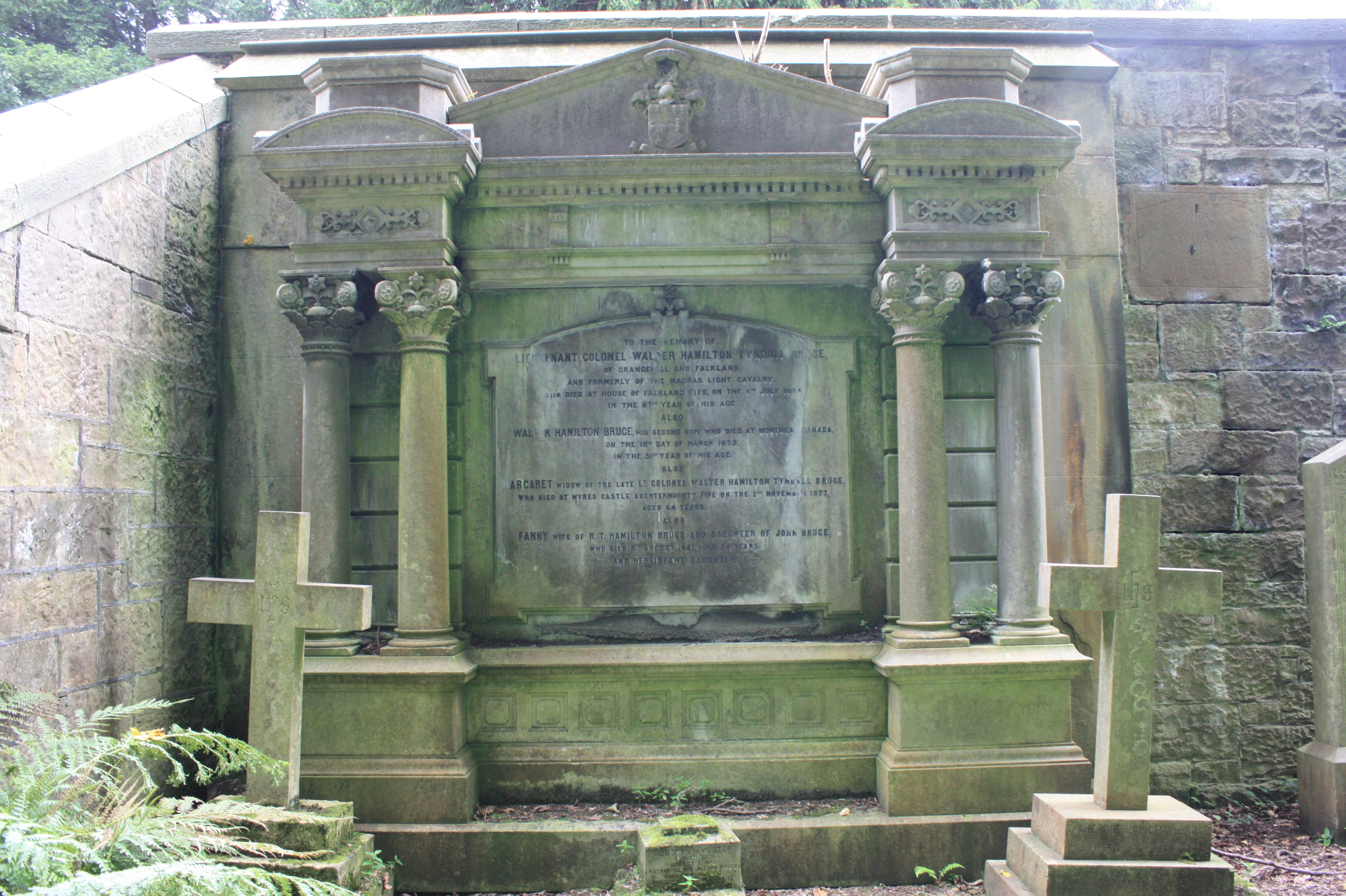
The grave of Lt Col Walter Hamilton Tyndall Bruce, south terrace, Dean Cemetery

- Alexander Hugh Freeland Barbour (1856–1927) pioneer of gynaecology
- Sir George Andreas Berry MP (1853–1940) eye surgeon
- Benjamin Hall Blyth (1849–1917) civil engineer
- Alexander Crum Brown (1838–1922) chemist
- Memorial to George Brown (Canadian politician) (1819–1880) plus the grave of Anne Nelson, his wife (1823–1906)
- Thomas Graham Brown (1882–1965) mountaineer and physiologist
- Duncan Cameron, (1825–1901), owner of The Oban Times newspaper and inventor of The "Waverley" nib pen and his daughter, Mary Cameron (painter) (1865–1921)
- Robert Carfrae FSAScot (1820–1900) antiquarian
- Thomas Clouston (1840–1915) psychiatrist
- Francis Brodie Imlach (1819–1891) pioneer of dentistry and anaesthesia
- Rev Dr Robert Reid Kalley (1809–1888) missionary
- Dr Peter McBride (1854–1946) physician
- William Mackintosh, Lord Kyllachy (1842–1918) Senator of the College of Justice
- Rev Angus Makellar (d. 1859) Moderator of the Church of Scotland for 1840
- Sir William Muir (1819–1905) Scottish Orientalist
- Samuel Alexander Pagan (1793–1867) President of the Royal College of Physicians of Edinburgh 1846 to 1848
- Joseph Noel Paton (1821–1901) artist
- Victor Noel-Paton, Baron Ferrier (1900–1992)
- Sir John Skelton (1831–1897) and his wife Dame Jane Adair Skelton (1847–1925)
- Sir David Wallace (1862–1952) urologist
- Dr Alexander Wood (1817–1884) inventor of the hypodermic syringe

=== Twentieth century extension ===
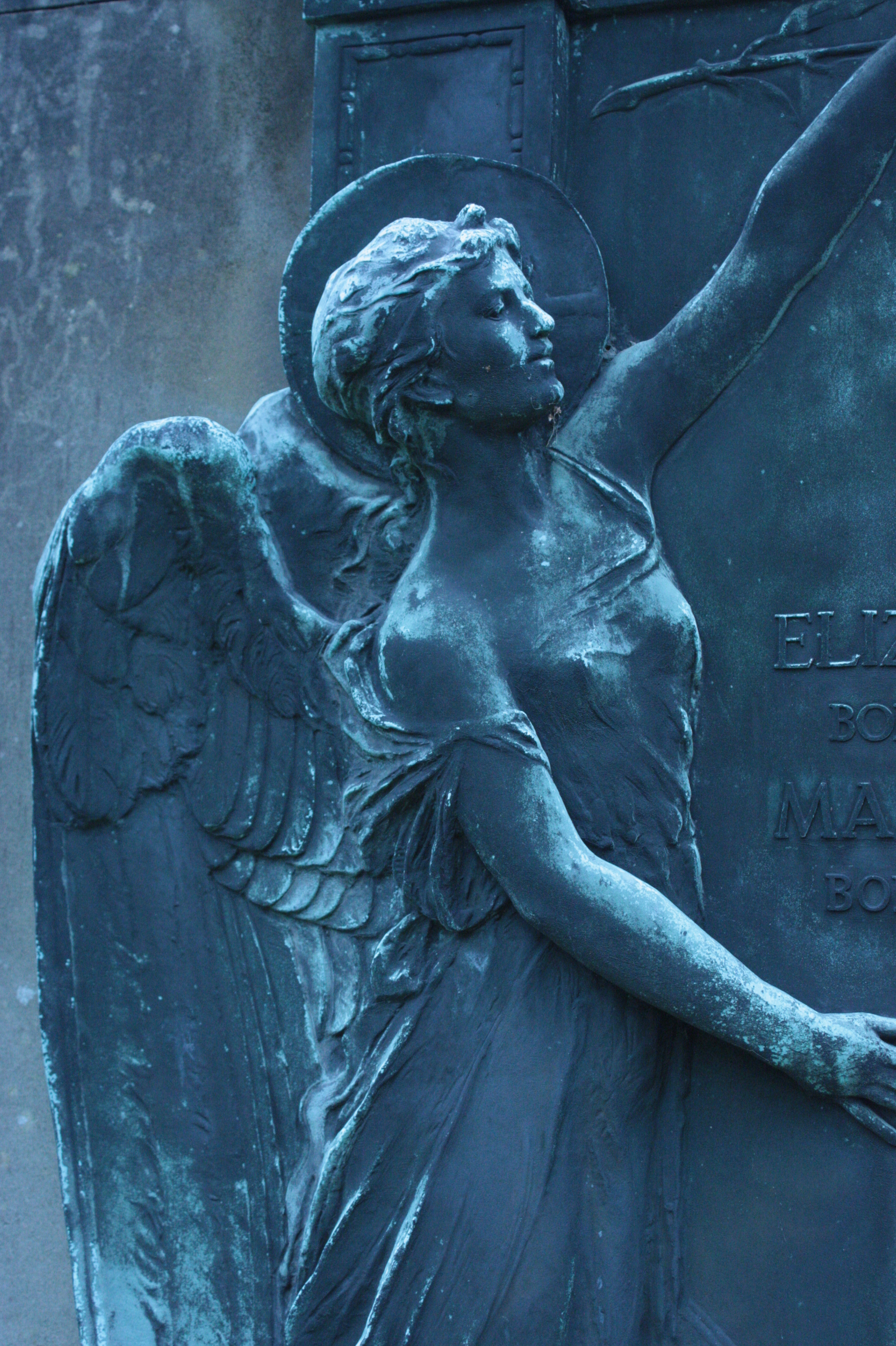
Monument to Elizabeth Dunlop Barclay by Henry Snell Gamley (1923)

- Andrew Anderson, Lord Anderson (1862–1936) Senator of the College of Justice
- John George Bartholomew map-maker (cenotaph)
- Walter Lorrain Brodie (1884–1918), Victoria Cross recipient (cenotaph)
- Andrew Constable, Lord Constable (1865–1928)
- William Skeoch Cumming (1864–1929) artist
- Arthur Dewar, Lord Dewar (1860–1917)
- Charles Scott Dickson, Lord Dickson (1850–1922)
- Sir John Ritchie Findlay, 1st Baronet (1866–1930) newspaper magnate
- Sir Alexander MacPherson Fletcher (1929–1989) MP 1973 to 1987
- John Alexander Ford (1864–1925) artist
- Rev James Rae Forgan (1876–1966) Moderator of the General Assembly of the Church of Scotland 1940
- Margaret Neill Fraser (1880–1915) lady golfer and heroine of the First World War memorialised on grave of Patrick Neill Fraser (buried in Serbia where she died)
- John George Govan (1861–1927) founder of the Faith Mission
- Herbert John Clifford Grierson (1866–1960)
- Rev Andrew Harper (1844–1936)
- John Robertson Henderson (1863–1925) zoologist
- Lady Caroline and Lord Walter James Hore, Baron Ruthven of Gowrie (1838–1921)
- George Hutchison (Unionist MP) (1873–1928)
- John Alexander Inglis (1873–1941) historian and author
- Ernest Auldjo Jamieson (1880–1937) architect
- George Auldjo Jamieson (1827–1900) accountant and company director
- David Smiles Jerdan (1871–1951) businessman and horticulturalist
- Christopher Nicholson Johnston, Lord Sands (1857–1934) judge and politician
- Stewart Kaye (1886–1952) architect
- Joseph Fairweather Lamb (1928–2015) physiologist
- Sir George Macdonald (1862–1940) archaeologist
- Sir Alexander MacPherson Fletcher MP (1929–1989)
- Father John Maitland Moir (1924–2013) priest
- Alexander Munro MacRobert (1873–1930) MP and Lord Advocate
- Sir Walter Mercer (1890–1971) surgeon
- George F. Merson (1866–1959) pharmacist
- Thomas Brash Morison (1868–1945) Senator of the College of Justice
- Sir Robert Muir (1864–1959) pathologist, and his sister, Anne Davidson Muir (1875–1951) artist
- Joseph Shield Nicholson (1850–1927) economist
- Ella Pirrie (1857–1929) friend and colleague of Florence Nightingale, first head nurse of Belfast City Hospital and first superintendent of the Deaconess Hospital in Edinburgh
- Edward Theodore Salvesen, Lord Salvesen (1857–1942) (bronze by Henry Snell Gamley) including the grave of his father-in-law, John Trayner, Lord Trayner
- Sir David William Scott-Barrett (1922–2003)
- Alistair Smart (1922–1992) art historian
- Sydney Goodsir Smith (1915–1975) poet and artist
- Lewis Spence (1874–1955) journalist, author and poet
- Douglas Strachan HRSA (1875–1950) stained glass window designer
- Sir Henry Wade (1876–1955) surgeon
- Sir Thomas Barnby Whitson (1869–1948) Lord Provost of Edinburgh 1929 to 1932

== Other monuments of interest ==
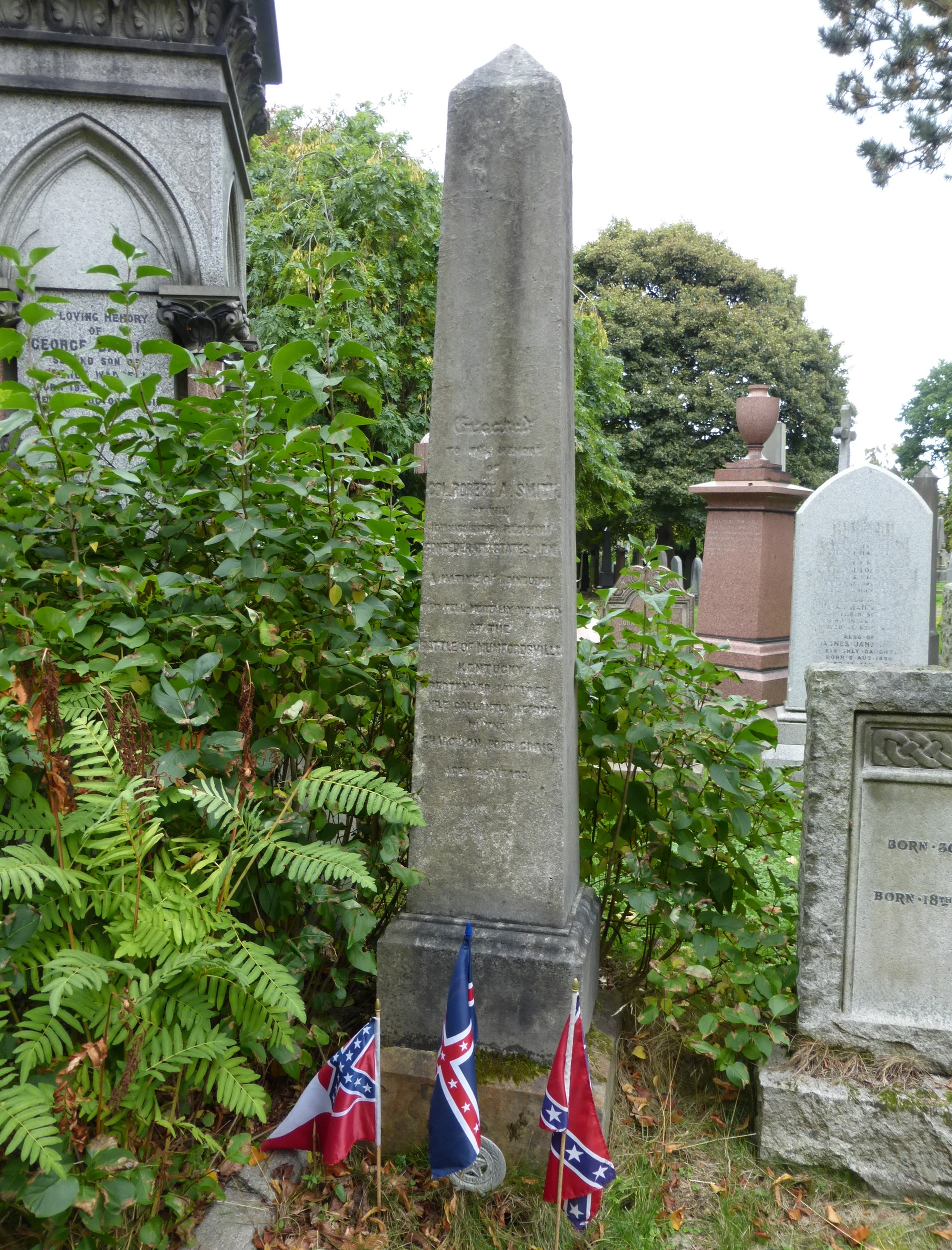
Colonel Smith's Monument

- Monument to John George Bartholomew, map-maker (buried in Portugal) on the north wall of the twentieth-century cemetery extension (sculpted by Pilkington Jackson)
- Monument to Robert Dunsmure and his brothers, all of whom died abroad
- Monument to Col Lauderdale Maule and the 79th Cameron Highlanders marking their role in the Crimean War at Alma and Sevastopol. The rear of the monument commemorates their part in the Indian Mutiny at Lucknow
- Monument to the Edinburgh-born Confederate Colonel Robert A. Smith who died in 1862 at Munfordsville, Kentucky in the American Civil War
- Monument to historian John Hill Burton, who is buried at Dalmeny. Monument in Dean is by William Brodie
- Monument to John Wilson (1800–1849), vocalist (buried in Quebec), also subject of a memorial at the foot of Calton Hill
- The Cemetery contains the war graves of 39 Commonwealth service personnel, 29 from World War I and 10 from World War II, registered and maintained by the Commonwealth War Graves Commission (CWGC). The oldest soldier registered by the CWGC as buried here is Major-General Sir John Munro Sym (1839–1919) aged 80. Most of the war graves lie in the independently accessed twentieth-century section to the north of the main cemetery.
- Robert Digby-Jones VC is memorialised on his parents' grave in the north extension.
- Monument to the orphans dying at the immediately adjacent Dean Orphanage
