= Francis Darby Syme =

Francis Darby Syme (1818–1871) was a Scottish businessman and creator of F D Syme & Co, and Syme, Muir & Co suppliers of cheap coolie labour, which was not far removed from slavery. He is primarily remembered for his role in the "coolie riot" or "Amoy riot" of 1852.

== Life ==
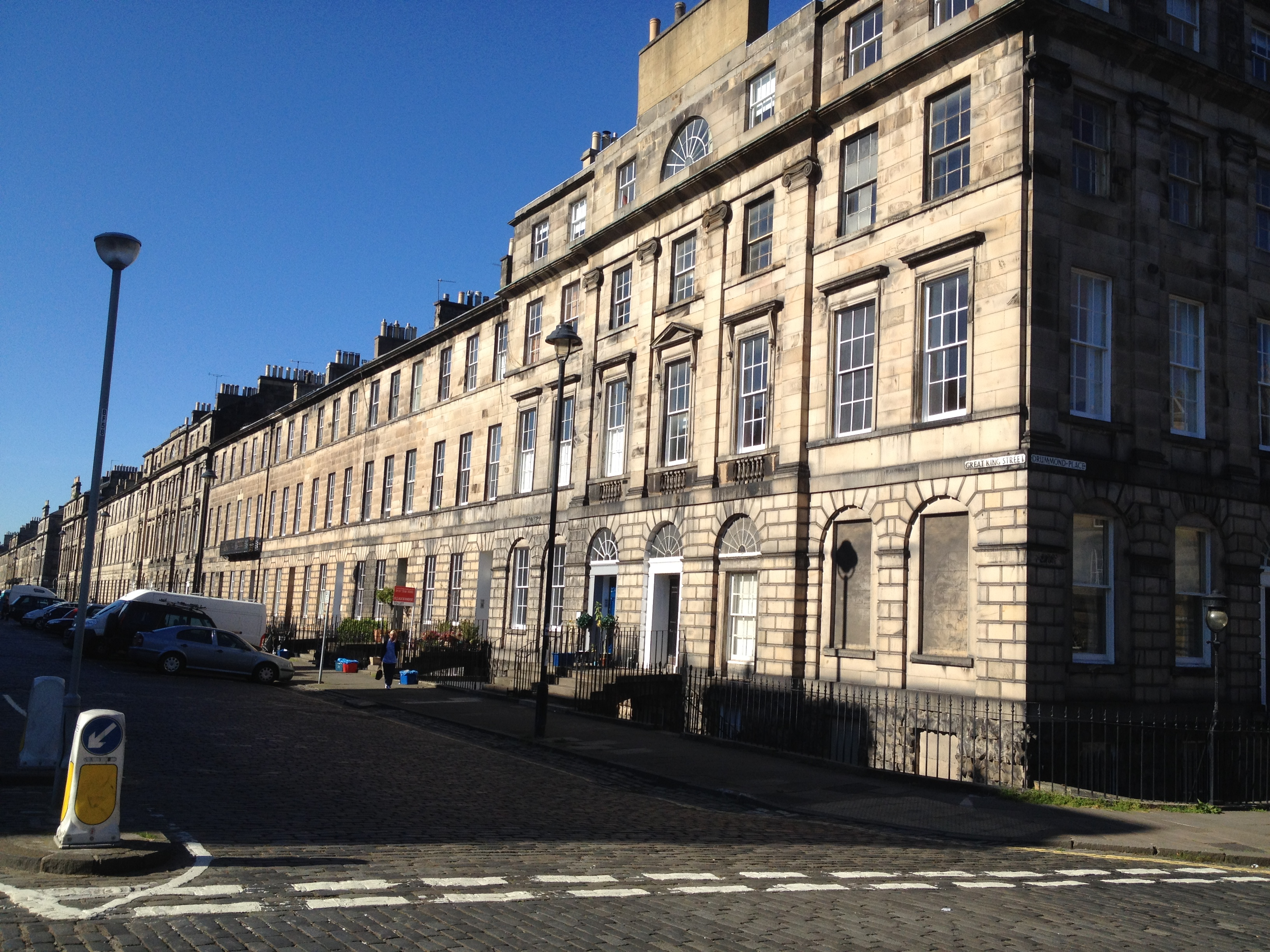
Great King Street, Edinburgh

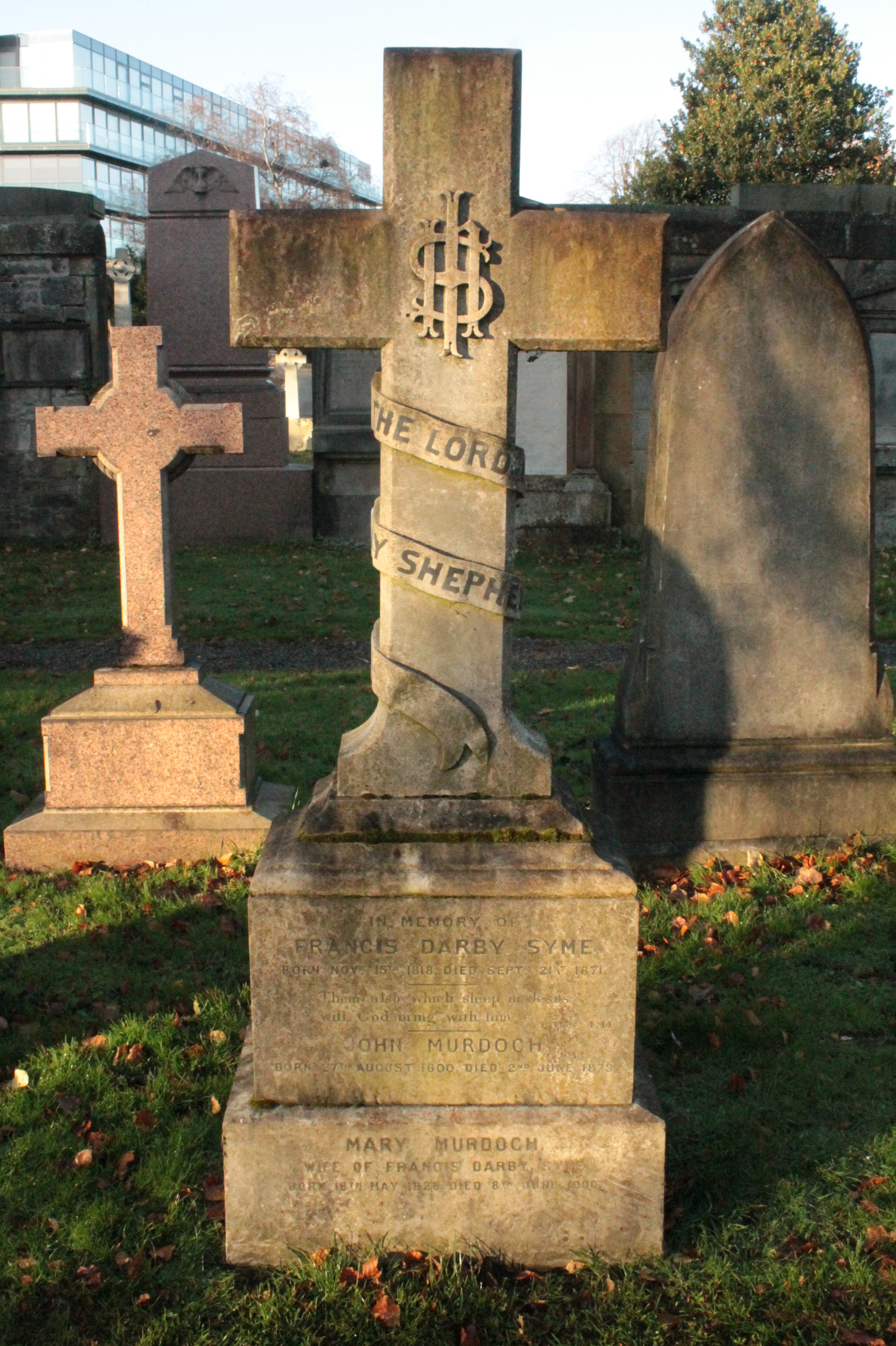
Dean Cemetery - the grave of Francis Darby Syme

Little is known of his early life. He was born in Scotland in 1818, probably in or near Edinburgh.

In December 1851, 410 coolies on the ship SS Robert Browne, en route from Amoy to San Francisco, rebelled against harsh treatment and killed the ship's captain whilst in Hong Kong Harbour. In an atmosphere of ongoing and growing unrest in the coolie trade, things peaked in August 1852. Syme entered the police station in Amoy, in his capacity as Director of Syme Muir & Co, to release a local Chinese "broker" in prison on kidnapping charges. His authority secured this but caused a wave of protest which spread from this action, accusing the companies of kidnapping and slavery. The resultant protests are generally called the "coolie riots" of 1852/3. The main perpetrators were seen as being Syme, Muir & Co and Tait & Co (James Tait). Eight protesters and four bystanders were killed by British marines at the peak of the riot in front of the Syme's premises. Syme was fined $200 for his part in the affray.

Syme Muir & Co are said to have erected a "barracoon" in front of their company offices in Amoy where they held the captured coolies, prior to shipping them around the world. This was locally known as the Ho-Ki Hong (Ho-Ki warehouse). Their actions were described in a contemporary report as "a disgrace to the British name". Their clearly illegal actions simply flaunted the local laws and the British government gave tacit approval of the coolie trade, seeing it as critical to colonial aspirations. Many of the coolies were sent to the West Indies to work on sugar plantations. Company practices included encouragement of the use of opium and encouragement of female infanticide. The trade also relied heavily upon a supply chain fed by Cantonese pirates, who would abduct unfortunate young men. Although the coolies were paid a wage in their destination, and therefore some perhaps did volunteer for the work, the wages were low and conditions were poor. The vast majority of coolies are thought to have been pressed into the role.

In August 1855 the British government introduced the Act for the Regulation of Chinese Passenger Ships, in an attempt to stem the coolie trade. One requirement of the act was that "passengers should be clear of their destination and wish to travel there". The Act was ineffective in bigger cities such as Hong Kong and Singapore but did act as a warning sign to the companies involved in the trade that their days were numbered. In cities such as Amoy where Syme operated the act was more influential and by December 1857 the export of unwilling coolies was declining. Syme, Muir & Co transferred there ships to Swatow and Macao and trade from Amoy more or less ceased.

In 1862 he sold his company interests in F D Syme & Co in Amoy to Thomas Deas Boyd, one of his managers, and it was thereafter known as "Boyd & Co". By this stage the coolie trade in general was in serious decline. The Americans introduced the Anti-Coolie Act in 1862 as a precursor to the abolition of slavery.

In 1866 Syme appears in Edinburgh being given a commission as Captain of the Edinburgh Artillery Volunteer Corps.

He lived his final years at 14 Great King Street, a huge Georgian townhouse in Edinburgh's Second New Town.

He died on 21 September 1871 and is buried in Dean Cemetery in western Edinburgh. The grave faces south on an east-west path to the north-west of the original cemetery and is marked by a white marble cross.

The coolie trade was abolished within the British Empire in 1875.

== Family ==
He was married to Mary Murdoch (1828-1900) daughter of John Murdoch (1800-1873).
