= Franklin Hudson =

Legendary Photographer and Osteopath Doctor

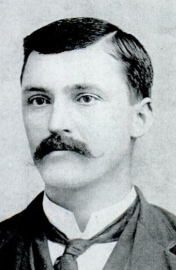
Franklin Hudson c.1890

Franklin Hudson (1864–1918) was a 19th/20th century American-born photographer and osteopath and medical author, raised in Darjeeling, India, before living in Scotland.

== Life ==
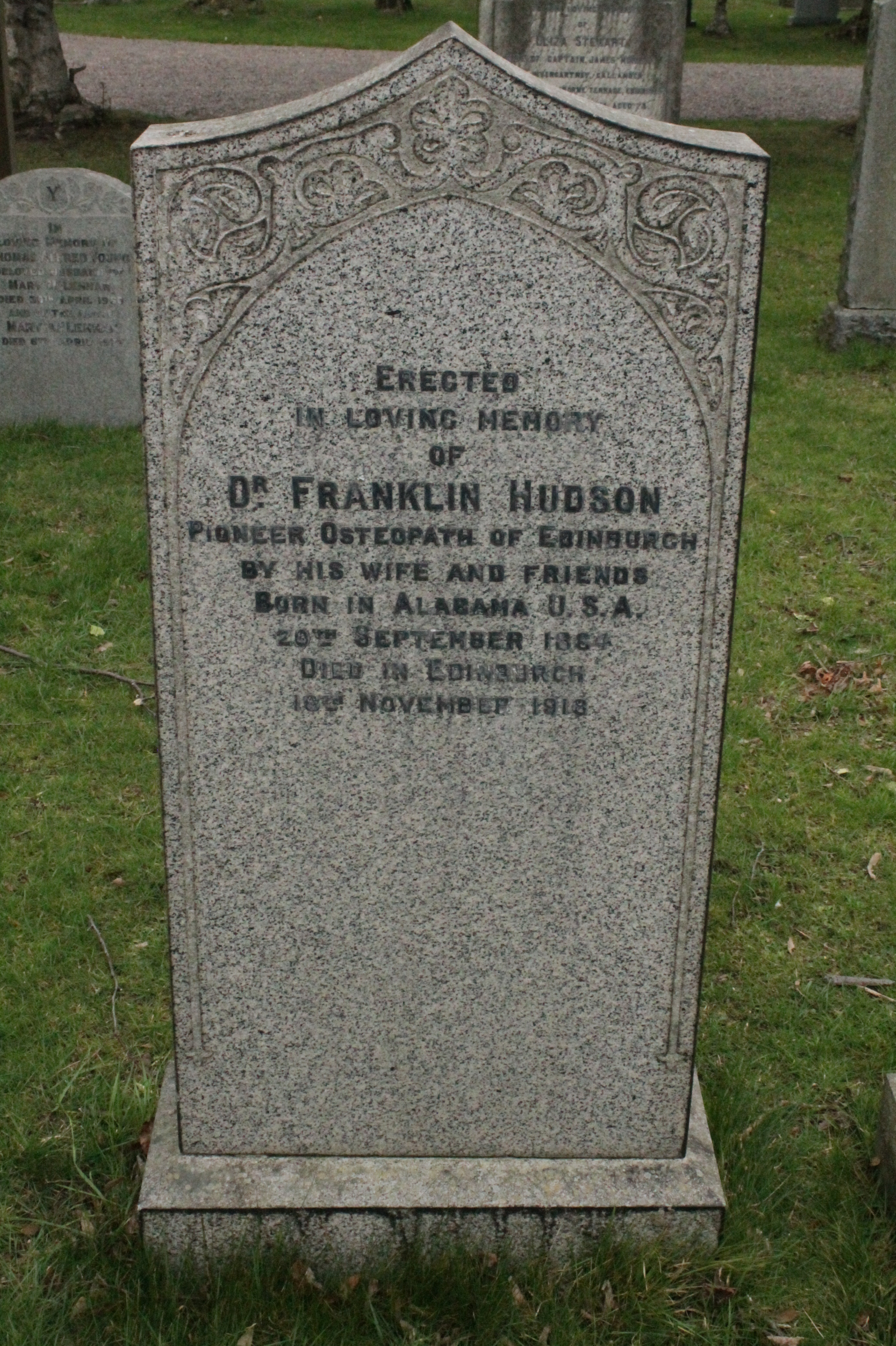
The grave of Franklin Hudson, Dean Cemetery

He was born in Andalusia, Alabama on 20 September 1864. His first job was as a boat pilot for Aaron Richey (founder of Port Richey, Florida).

In 1891 he moved to Paris, Texas, then working as a photographer. Here he trained as an osteopath and became one of the original members of the American Osteopathic Association in 1897.

He emigrated to Scotland in 1903. He lived at 12 Lansdowne Crescent in western Edinburgh, a large terraced Victorian townhouse.

He died of the Spanish flu on 16 November 1918. He is buried near his home, in Dean Cemetery. The simple grave describes as a pioneer of osteopathy. It lies in the south-east section of the first northern extension.

== Family ==
In 1893 he was married to the then 16 year old Lucy Rivers Sullivan (b.1876), daughter of Knott Sullivan. She outlived him.

== Publications ==
- Osteopathic Medicine (1906)
