= James Rae Forgan =

Scottish minister

James Rae Forgan (1876-1966) was a Scottish minister who served as Moderator of the General Assembly of the Church of Scotland in 1940.

== Life ==
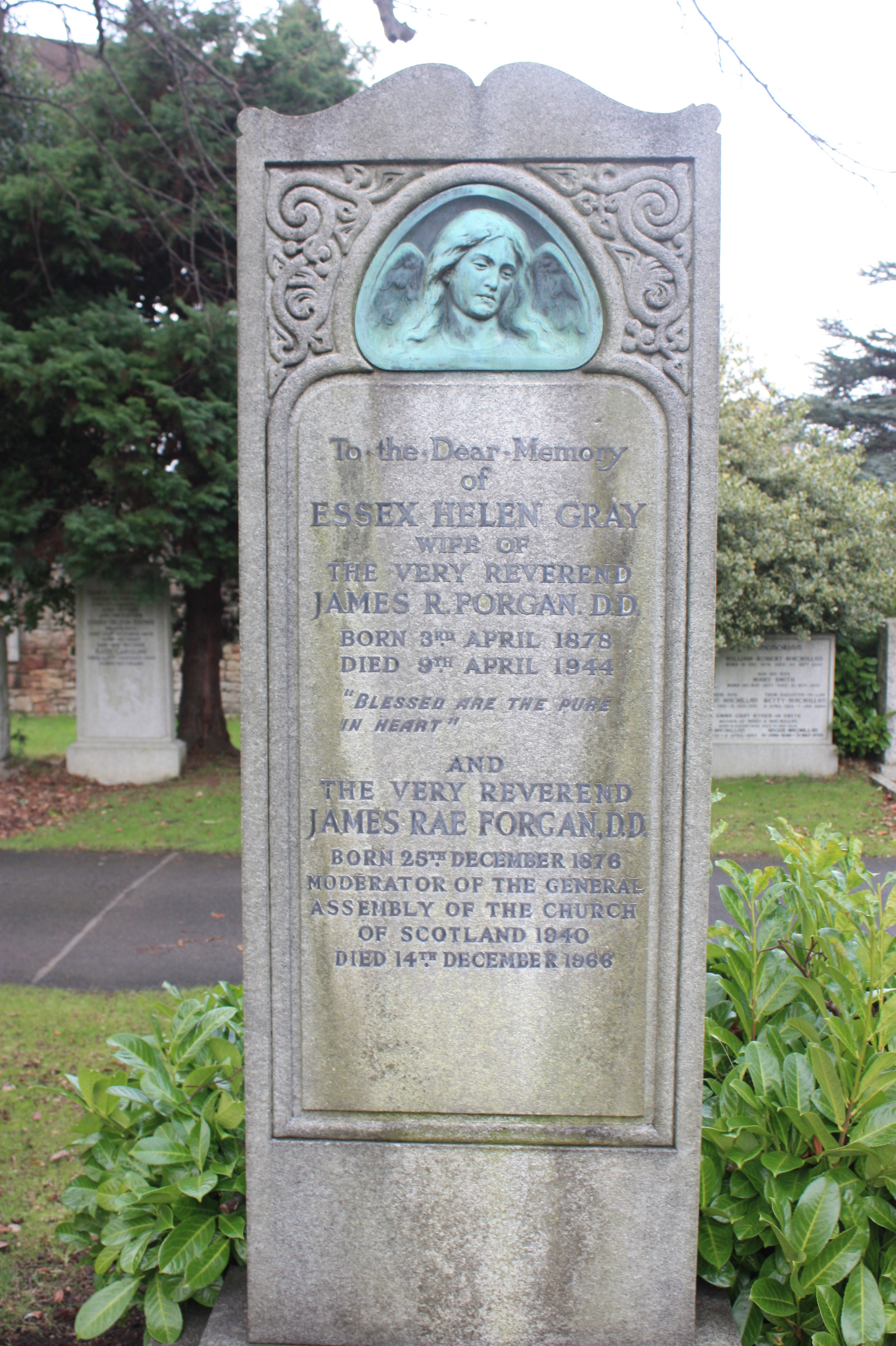
The grave of James Rae Forgan, Dean Cemetery, Edinburgh

He was born in Perth on 25 December 1876.

In 1898 he began studying divinity at the University of Edinburgh, graduating MA in 1902.

He served as minister to Uddingston Chalmers United Free Church until 1918, then moving to St Stephens West Church in Broughty Ferry. In 1921 he went to Ayr Trinity United Free Church.

In the First World War he served as honorary chaplain to the forces. In 1929 the United Free Church re-amalgamated with the established Church of Scotland. Forgan remained in Ayr (thereafter known as St Columbas) and served as moderator to the entire church in 1940 before retiring in 1946.

He died on 14 December 1966 shortly before his 90th birthday. He is buried with his wife in the modern north extension to Dean Cemetery on Queensferry Road in Edinburgh. The grave lies to the east, not far from the entrance on an east–west path.

== Family ==
He was married to Essex Helen Gray (1878–1944) who predeceased him by over 20 years. A stained glass window in Ayr Trinity Church (now known as St Columbas) is dedicated to her memory.
