= National Archives of Scotland =

Coordinates: 55°57′13.62″N 3°11′21.53″W

National Archives of Scotland logo

The National Archives of Scotland (NAS) is the previous name of the National Records of Scotland (NRS), and are the national archives of Scotland, based in Edinburgh. The NAS claims to have one of the most varied collection of archives in Europe. It is the main archive for sources of the history of Scotland as an independent state (see Kingdom of Scotland), her role in the British Isles and the links between Scotland and many other countries over the centuries.

The NAS changed its name from the Scottish Record Office on 7 January 1999 and is both an associated department and Executive Agency of the Scottish Government, headed by the Keeper of the Records of Scotland. The agency is responsible to the Scottish Minister for Europe, External Affairs and Culture. Its antecedents date back to the 13th century.

It is responsible for selecting, preserving, and promoting and making available the national archives of Scotland. It also has a role in records management more generally.

The National Archives of Scotland is based at three locations in Edinburgh: HM General Register House with New Register House (open to the public) and West Register House in the city centre, and Thomas Thomson House in the Sighthill area of the city which is the main repository and also houses a conservation department and other offices. Access to the archives is open to members of the public.

On 1 April 2011, NAS, as a governmental body, was merged with the General Register Office for Scotland to form National Records of Scotland. The term National Archives of Scotland is still sometimes employed to refer to the archives (the records collections) themselves.

== History ==
=== Early history ===
The early history of the national archives of Scotland reflects Scotland's own troubled history. Many records were lost as a result of being taken out of the country first in the 13th century by Edward I during the Wars of Independence and later by Oliver Cromwell in the 17th century. As a result, the earliest surviving Scottish public record is the Quitclaim of Canterbury of 1189; the oldest private record is a charter by David I to the church of St Cuthbert in Edinburgh, 1127. The earliest surviving exchequer roll belongs only to 1326; the records of the Great Seal survive only from 1315; and, although there are a few early rolls starting in 1292, full records of Parliament do not begin until 1466. The first reference to a government official responsible for looking after the records dates from 1286. William of Dumfries was a clerk of the rolls of the royal 'chapel' or chancery. This office was later to develop into that of Lord Clerk Register.

=== The archives in the Middle Ages ===
When war broke out between Scotland and England in 1296 and Edward I invaded, he had all the symbols of Scots nationhood—the regalia, the national archives and the Stone of Destiny—removed to London. The Treaty of Edinburgh–Northampton ended the first War of Independence in 1329 and provided for the return of the records to Scotland. But they remained in London, many disappeared, and when their remnants were sent back to Scotland in 1948, only about 200 documents remained. During the reign of Robert I, 'the Bruce' (1306–1329), and with the more settled nature of the country after the battle of Bannockburn in 1314, the national archives grew in quantity. Records accumulated over the centuries and by the mid-sixteenth century it became necessary to build a special 'register house' in Edinburgh Castle to house them.

=== Civil War and Cromwell ===
The archives remained safe in the Castle until its capture by Cromwell's army in December 1650. The Scots were allowed to remove the archives and they were deposited in Stirling Castle. When that too fell to the English in August 1651, some of the records were carried off by the garrison, some were rescued by the clerks, but most were sent away to London. Their removal proved very inconvenient, so in 1657 the legal registers were returned to Scotland. It was not until the restoration of Charles II in 1660 that the other records were sent back. One of the two ships carrying the archives, the 'Elizabeth', sank in a storm off the Northumbrian coast with the loss of all the papers and parchments on board.

=== The Laigh Hall ===
Those records which had survived the voyage north were deposited again in Edinburgh Castle. But in 1662 the legal registers were transferred to the Laigh Hall below the Parliament Hall on the Royal Mile in Edinburgh, where parliamentary and other records from the Castle joined them in 1689. The move was partly designed to promote access to the records, but the accommodation was far from satisfactory and the archives were damaged by damp and vermin. Records were piled on the floor and the backs of cupboards ran with damp. The great fire of 1700, which threatened the Parliament House, forced a temporary removal of the records to St Giles' church for safety. Although the Treaty of Union of 1707 specified that the public records were to remain in Scotland in all time coming, there was no public money available to provide adequate accommodation and supervision for them.

=== General Register House ===
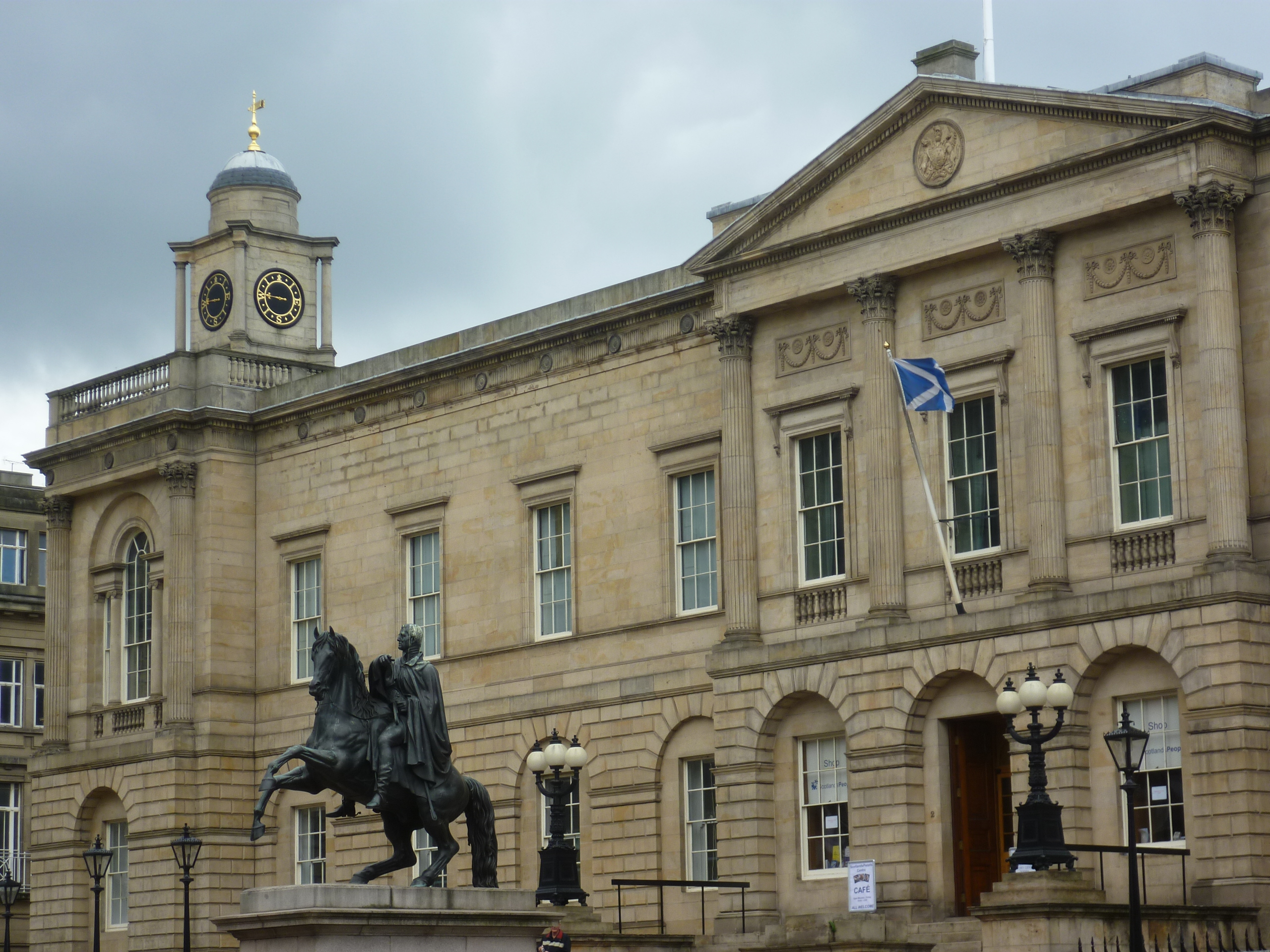
General Register House

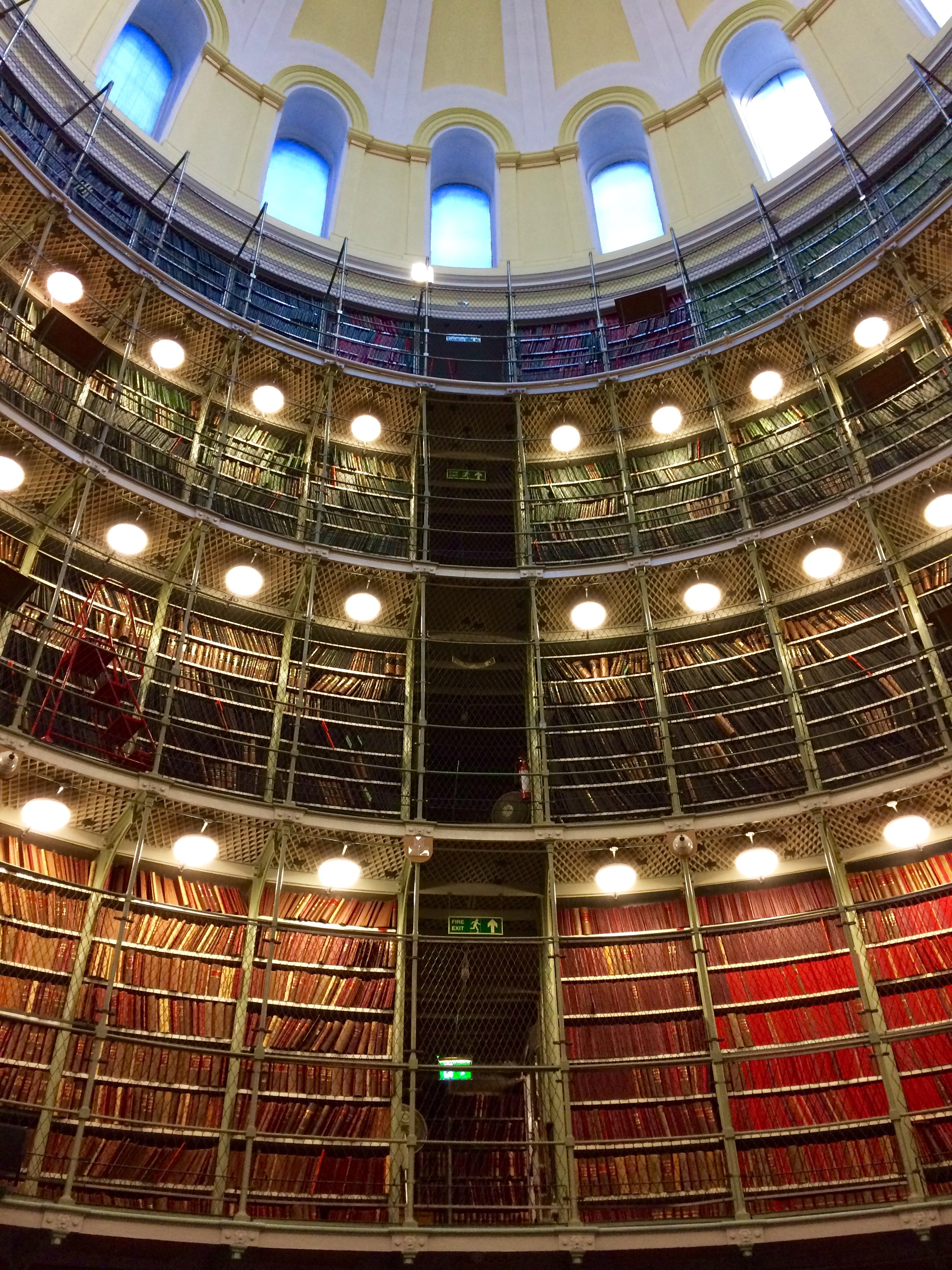
Circular Record Hall, General Register Office

By the mid-eighteenth century the need to provide accommodation for the national archives was widely recognised. In 1765 a grant of £12,000 was obtained from the estates of Jacobites forfeited after the Jacobite rising of 1745 towards building a 'proper repository'. A site was chosen fronting the end of the North Bridge then under construction. The eminent architect Robert Adam and his brother James were selected for the project in 1772 and the foundation stone was laid in 1774, by which time the original plans had been modified. Robert Adam used stone from local quarries, Edinburgh tradesmen for supplies and local masons and craftsmen. The building, although an empty shell, was not roofless when work ceased in 1779. Receipts and other contemporary evidence confirm this.

The incomplete building, described as 'the most magnificent pigeon-house in Europe', was the haunt of thieves and pick-pockets. Construction resumed in 1785 and General Register House was completed to Robert Adam's modified design in 1788. It was hoped to build his proposed north range if funds ever became available. Robert Reid, also architect of St George's Church (now West Register House) and the facade of Parliament House, finished the exterior to a simplified version of Robert Adam's original design and the interior to his own design in the 1820s. Reid also designed the Antiquarian Room (now the Historical Search Room) which opened to the public in 1847. General Register House is one of the oldest custom built archive buildings still in continuous use in the world.

=== Thomas Thomson ===
In 1806 the office of Deputy Clerk Register was created to oversee the day-to-day running of the office. The appointment of Thomas Thomson to the post laid the foundation of the modern record office. His thirty-five year term of office saw a programme of cataloguing and repair of the older records and the start of a series of record publications.

=== West Register House ===
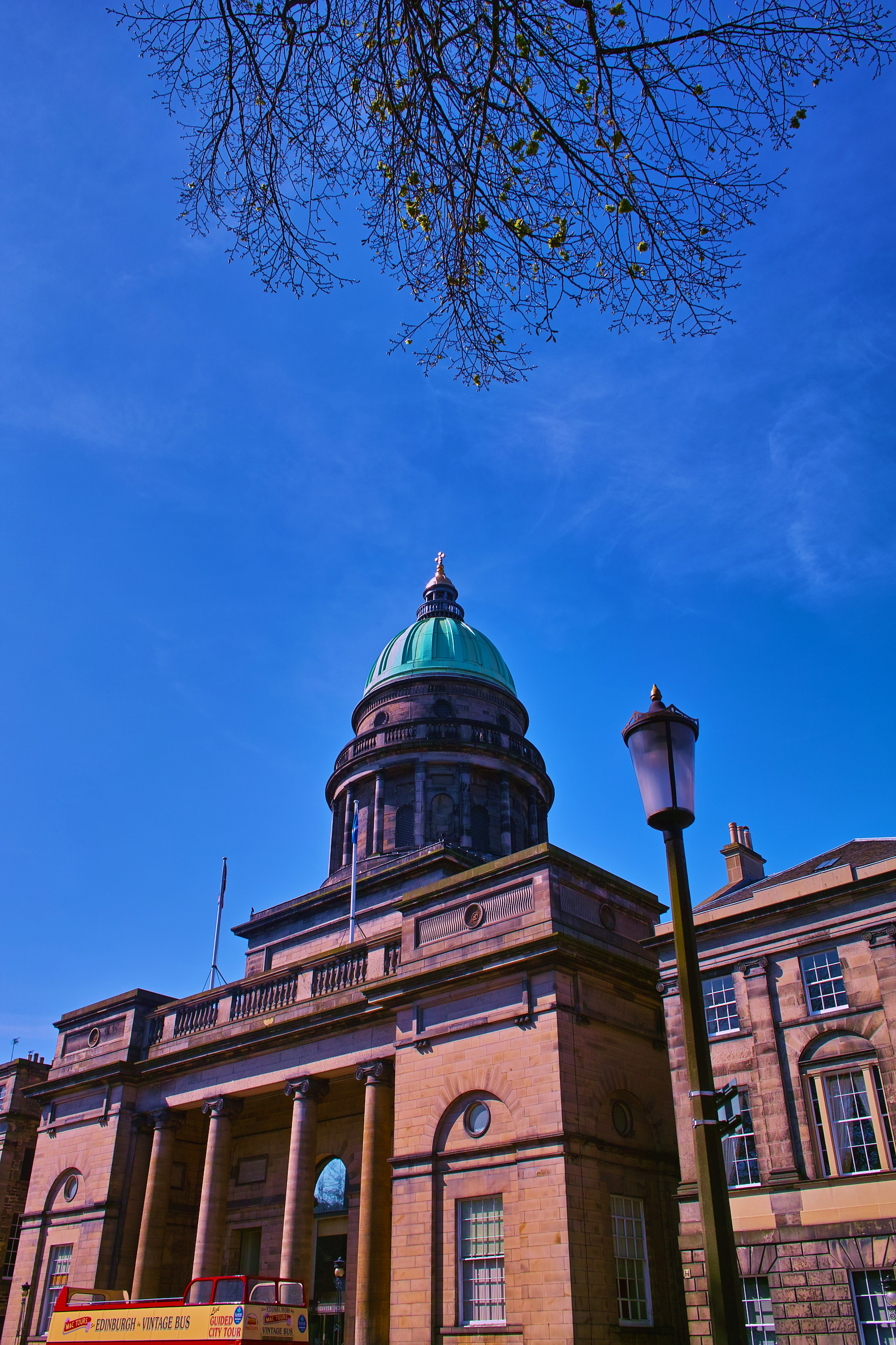
West Register House

Since the early twentieth century accessions of records have increased both in bulk and variety. The growth in the office's activities and holdings brought a need for more accommodation and improved facilities. In 1971 the former St George's Church in Charlotte Square was converted into West Register House. Robert Adam, architect of General Register House, designed the frontages of the houses in Charlotte Square and included a plan for a church in his drawings in 1791. The plan was never used and in 1810 Robert Reid drew up a new design. The foundation stone was laid in May 1811 and the building opened to public worship in 1814. The church discovered dry rot in 1959 and, unable to meet the spiralling costs of repair, closed in 1961, the congregation moving to St Andrew's Church along George Street. In 1968 began the process of converting the church into a branch of the Scottish Record Office. The exterior was left unaltered but the entire interior was removed and replaced by five floors of reinforced concrete for offices and record storage.

=== Thomas Thomson House ===
By the 1980s both city centre sites were filled to capacity and it became clear that another building was needed. This provided an opportunity to design a modern archive building. In 1994 Thomas Thomson House was built at Sighthill Industrial Estate in the west of Edinburgh and opened the following year by the Princess Royal. Designed to provide space for the National Archives of Scotland until the mid 21st century, the building is essentially two separate buildings joined together. One high-tech block provides over 37 kilometres of environmentally controlled record storage, while the other houses records reception and sorting areas, staff offices, a purpose-built conservation unit and digital imaging facilities.

== Collections and access ==
The National Archives of Scotland contains records from parchment and paper scrolls through to digital files and archived websites. One widely known document held is the Declaration of Arbroath.

The material held, searchable through the NAS On-Line Catalogue, and accessible (free of charge to examine) both in person at NAS search rooms (after reader pass application procedures), and in certain circumstances through other methods such as by post includes the following:

- Government Records of pre-1707 Scottish crown, parliament and government; records of the post-1886 Scottish Office and Scottish Government.
- Legal registers and Court documents Registers of deeds and sasines; services of heirs; Records of the Court of Session, and the High Court of Justiciary, sheriff courts (including adoption records) and commissary courts. Notably, the NAS provides about 5,000 extracts from legal registers each year, mainly at a cost for professional legal researchers instructed by law firms. The Keeper is, in addition to his responsibility to Ministers, also responsible to the Lord President of the Court of Session for the efficient management of the court and other legal records in Scotland.
- The Churches Records for the Church of Scotland, Free Church of Scotland, and various dissenting ('seceding') congregations; records of the Scottish Episcopal Church; copies of the records of baptisms, marriages and burials for Roman Catholics before 1855.
- Nationalised industries and transport Records of the Scottish rail and canal systems, coal, gas, electricity, steel and shipbuilding industries.
- Local administration Valuation rolls for all Scottish counties and burghs 1855–1995; records of some burghs, county councils, justices of the peace and other local authorities.
- Private and corporate bodies Family, legal and estate papers; several gifts and deposited papers; records of businesses, societies and institutions.
- Maps and plans Maps, plans, architectural and technical drawings from government departments, nationalised industries, transport systems, courts, churches, private and corporate bodies.

== Other services ==
In addition to selecting, preserving and making available to all the national archives of Scotland, the NAS has several other functions. Part of this relates to outreach, providing educational and other resources for teachers and other educational services, and ensuring the archives are available to Scottish society. One example of this outreach was an exhibition at the Scottish Parliament to mark the Act of Union.

The NAS advises Scottish Ministers on records and information policy, and has to be consulted in relation to certain statutory codes of practice issued under the Freedom of Information (Scotland) Act 2002. The NAS advises Scottish public authorities about the creation and management of their records, and advises public and private owners about their historical records and it provides a reference service to the public on all aspects of the national archives. It provides the National Register of Archives of Scotland, a database of archival sources in Scotland, which is available online. It takes the lead in the development of records management and archival policy in Scotland.

== Scottish Archive Network (SCAN) ==
In the late 1990s the NAS became a pioneer in the digitisation and provision of online access to historical records on a very large scale, under the auspices of the Scottish Archive Network (SCAN) project, whose partners were the National Archives of Scotland (NAS), the Heritage Lottery Fund (HLF), and the Genealogical Society of Utah (now Family Search). The SCAN project created a single electronic catalogue to the holdings of more than 50 Scottish archives and set up a copying programme, using high quality single-capture digital cameras.

SCAN's main achievement was the digital capture of half a million wills and testaments recorded in Commissary Court and Sheriff Court registers between 1513 and 1901, linking these to a unified index, and making them available online.

Following the project's completion in 2004, NAS maintained the products and websites of SCAN.

== Recent developments ==
=== Digitisation ===
The NAS has expanded its digitisation programme begun under the SCAN project. It is currently involved in digitising the register of sasines (Scotland's property register) and the records of ecclesiastical courts (kirk sessions, presbyteries, synods and the General Assembly of the Church of Scotland). The church court records extend to some five million pages of information and the NAS is, at the time of writing (2008), developing an online access system for large-scale, unindexed historical sources, in parallel to free access in the NAS's public search rooms, known as "virtual volumes".

=== ScotlandsPeople Website ===
In conjunction with the General Register Office for Scotland (GROS), the NAS supplies content for the ScotlandsPeople website, allowing searches in pre-1855 old parish registers (OPRs); statutory registers of births, marriages and deaths from 1855; census returns, 1841–1921; and the testaments digitally captured by the SCAN project.

=== ScotlandsPeople Centre ===
The ScotlandsPeople Centre is for those interested in genealogy. It opened fully on 12 January 2009 after being partially open since July 2008. The Centre is based in HM General Register House and New Register House, and is a partnership between the NAS, the General Register Office for Scotland, and the Court of the Lord Lyon, providing a single base for genealogical research in Scotland. Unlike the National Archives, use of most facilities at the ScotlandsPeople Centre is not free of charge.

=== Scottish Public Records Review ===
The National Archives of Scotland was instructed by Scottish Ministers in 2008 to review and assess the current state of public records legislation in Scotland, some of which dates to the 1930s. The Review published its report.

== See also ==
- List of national archives
- General Register Office for Scotland
- Court of the Lord Lyon
- The National Archives
- Royal Commission on the Ancient and Historical Monuments of Scotland
