= West Register House =

Former church in Edinburgh

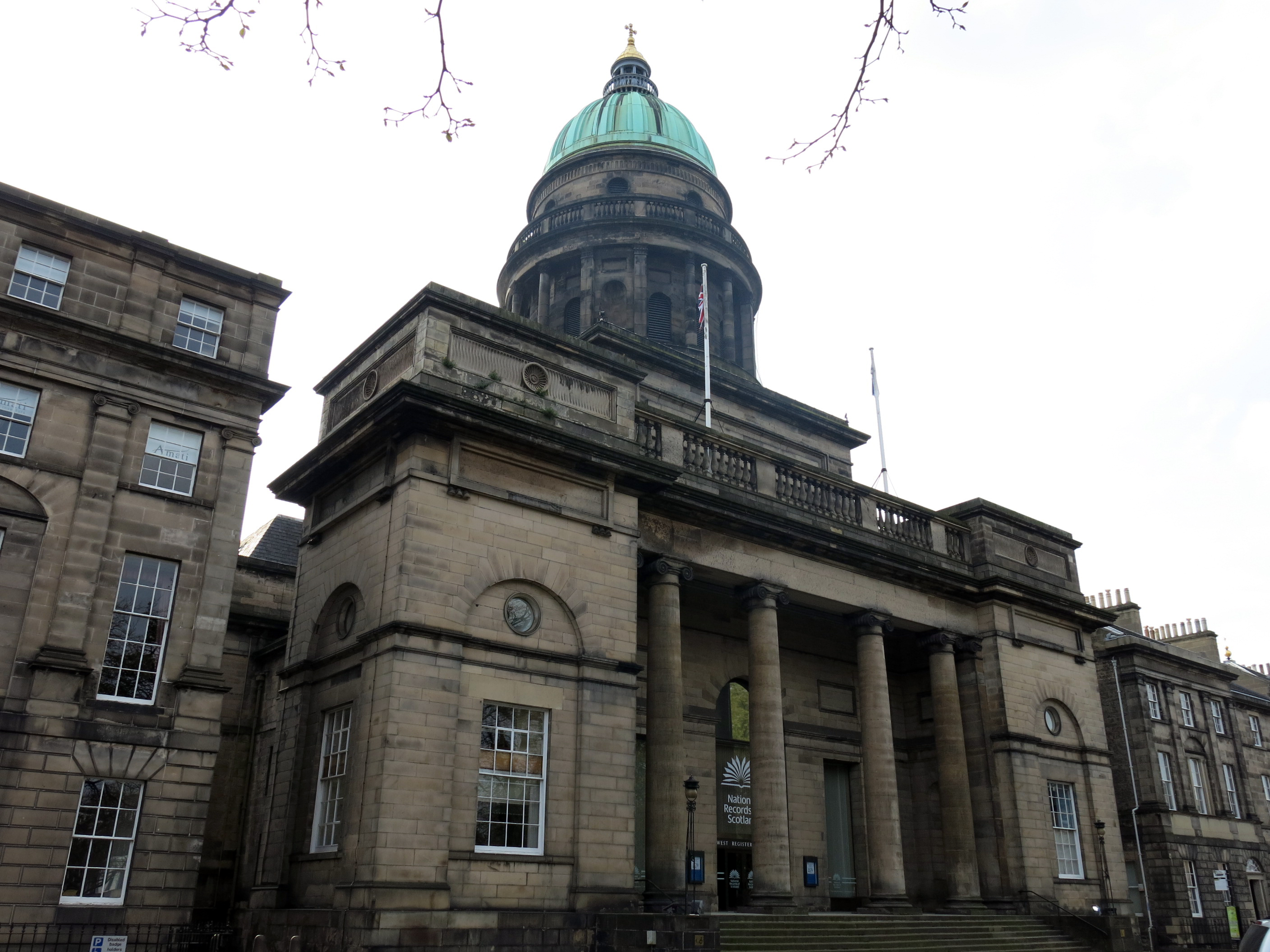
- Interactive map of the West Register House area
- Former names: St George’s Church

General information
- Status: In use
- Type: Records office
- Architectural style: Neoclassical
- Classification: Category A
- Location: Charlotte Square, 17 Charlotte Square, Edinburgh, EH2 4DF, Edinburgh, Scotland
- Coordinates: 55°57′05.5″N 3°12′33.0″W
- Construction started: 1811
- Completed: 1814
- Renovated: 1964–1970
- Cost: £30,000 (1814)
- Owner: National Records of Scotland

Height
- Height: 160 ft (49 m)

Technical details
- Material: Sandstone
- Floor count: 5

Design and construction
- Architects: Robert Reid

Listed Building – Category A
- Official name: Charlotte Square, West Register House (Former St George’s Church)
- Designated: 3 March 1966
- Reference no.: LB27360

West Register House is a building of the National Records of Scotland, located on Charlotte Square in Edinburgh, Scotland, United Kingdom. The building was constructed between 1811 and 1814 as St George's Church and converted to its current purpose as a records office between 1964 and 1970.

The church's site in the centre of the western side of Charlotte Square had been designated for a church as part of James Craig's initial plan for the New Town. The building was designed by Robert Reid after a similar but more intricate plan by Robert Adam, who designed the square's surrounding terraces. Construction began in 1811 and, though initially projected to cost £18,000, the total cost came to £33,000. The facade centres on an Ionic portico, above which rises a substantial green copper dome on a tall, peristyle drum. The dome, topped by a gilt cupola and cross, is a prominent feature of the Edinburgh skyline and terminates the view west along George Street. The interior of the church was gutted during its conversion as a records office. It had been noted for its tall pulpit by William Trotter.

St George's Church opened in 1814 to serve as the Church of Scotland parish church for the western half of the New Town. In its early years, it was notable for the ministries of two leading evangelicals: Andrew Mitchell Thomson and Robert Smith Candlish. The latter led out a significant portion of the congregation during the Disruption of 1843. Thomson also established a strong musical tradition at St George's: this continued with prominent choirmasters and organists, including Alexander Mackenzie. By the early 1960s, severe structural damage in the church building had become apparent and, in 1964, the congregation united with that of St Andrew's on George Street to form St Andrew's and St George's. Between 1964 and 1970, Robert Saddler converted the building for use as a public records office. A restoration of the building was completed in 2021.

== History ==
=== St George's Church ===
In 1809, Parliament resolved that when the population of the western part of the New Town reached 5,000, the civic authorities should build a new Church of Scotland church to serve the area's inhabitants. The eastern part of the New Town was already served by St Andrew's Church yet, as the New Town had expanded, demand for sittings had grown so great that some Presbyterian worshippers had resorted to attending St George's Episcopal Chapel on York Place.

Robert Adam had designed a church as the centrepiece of the western side of the square; The funds raised by renting pews in advance had proven insufficient, however. The city council therefore charged Robert Reid to create a new design. Reid had offered a verbal estimate of £18,000 for the costs of construction.

The foundation stone was laid on 14 May 1811 by William Calder, Lord Provost of Edinburgh. Construction took three years and the first service took place on Sunday, 5 June 1814 during celebrations for the conclusion of the War of the Sixth Coalition. Henry Moncreiff-Wellwood, minister of St Cuthbert's, preached the first sermon. By completion, the cost of the project had nearly doubled to £33,000. Prior to opening, the charge had been erected as a parish quoad sacra by the presbytery with a parish area allotted from portions of St Andrew's and St Cuthbert's. As the charge was supported by the city council, St George's was a burgh church and the stipend of its minister was supported by diverting money from the second charge of the New North Church.

The church's first minister was Andrew Mitchell Thomson: the informal leader of the Church of Scotland's evangelical faction and a keen social reformer. When Thomson died in 1831, Thomas Chalmers, his effective successor as the leading evangelical, preached his funeral sermon in St George's. Assisted from 1823 by choirmaster R.A. Smith, Thomson also established St George's strong musical tradition, even holding choir practices at his house. Smith's most notable successor was Alexander Mackenzie: who served as choirmaster and organist from 1870 to 1881.

Initially, St George's supported the Sunday school work of St Andrew's using the kitchen of the Assembly Rooms on George Street. Soon, St George's established its own schools in Rose Street and William Street before a mission was established on Young Street in 1835. In 1837, this congregation became a parish quoad sacra as St Luke's. At the Disruption of 1843, the congregation joined the Free Church.

St George's minister from 1834, Robert Smith Candlish, was second only to Chalmers as a leading evangelical; he was also an enthusiastic promoter of Sabbatarianism. At the Disruption of 1843, Candlish led out much of his congregation to form Free St George's. (Note: The Free congregation moved to a brick building in Castle Terrace then to a church by David Cousin on the west side of Lothian Road in 1845. 1n 1869, the congregation moved to a new church by David Bryce on Shandwick Place after the Caledonian Railway purchased their previous building. The congregation led many foreign and domestic missions. In 1900, the congregation joined the United Free Church and, in 1929, the Church of Scotland as St George's West. In 2013, the congregation united with St Andrew's and St George's to form St Andrew's and St George's West. The congregation's Shandwick Place building has been occupied since 2016 by the Charlotte Chapel, a Baptist congregation.) During Candlish's ministry, the congregation counted several Lords of Session, including James Wellwood Moncreiff and his son, James Moncreiff, 1st Baron Moncreiff; David Cathcart, Lord Alloway; James Ivory, Lord Ivory; Henry Cockburn, Lord Cockburn; John Fullerton, Lord Fullerton; Alexander Maconochie, Lord Meadowbank; and Thomas Maitland, Lord Dundrennan. Three Lord Provosts – William Trotter of Ballindean, Kincaid Mackenzie, and John Learmonth – were also seat-holders as were Sir John Sinclair of Ulbster and the scholars James Pillans and John Shank More.

In the middle of the twentieth century, structural issues began to plague the building and a portal frame was erected to support the dome. The congregation launched an appeal for £40,000 in January 1960. Despite the appeal's success, the extent of dry rot in the building soon became apparent and the congregation entered into negotiations for union with St Andrew's. The charges were linked with a single minister in June 1962 and formal union was completed on 7 June 1964. At the time of its closure, the church maintained halls and a church officer's house at Randolph Place. The manse was at 17 Wester Coates Crescent, having been at 3 Melville Crescent before 1946.

The following ministers served St George's:

- 1814–1831† Andrew Mitchell Thomson
- 1831–1834† James Martin
- 1834–1843 Robert Smith Candlish
- 1843–1879 Robert Horne Stevenson
- 1880–1909† Archibald Scott
- 1909–1917† Gavin Lang Pagan
- 1918–1950† Charles William Gray Taylor
- 1951–1955 James Robert Thomson
- 1956–1962 William Cecil Bigwood

† died in office

=== West Register House ===
The building was purchased by Scottish Records Office and converted to a public record office under Robert Saddler of the Ministry of Public Building and Works. This involved the gutting of the interior to install five storeys and a two-storey entrance hall. During conversion, the West Register House was designated a Category A listed building in 1966.

Restoration work on the building, supported by Edinburgh World Heritage was completed in 2021. This included covering the exterior in scaffolding to restore stonework and to regild the cross at the top of the building. During the restoration, homelessness charities, including Shelter, criticised plans to install railings to deter rough sleepers.

== Architecture ==
=== Setting ===
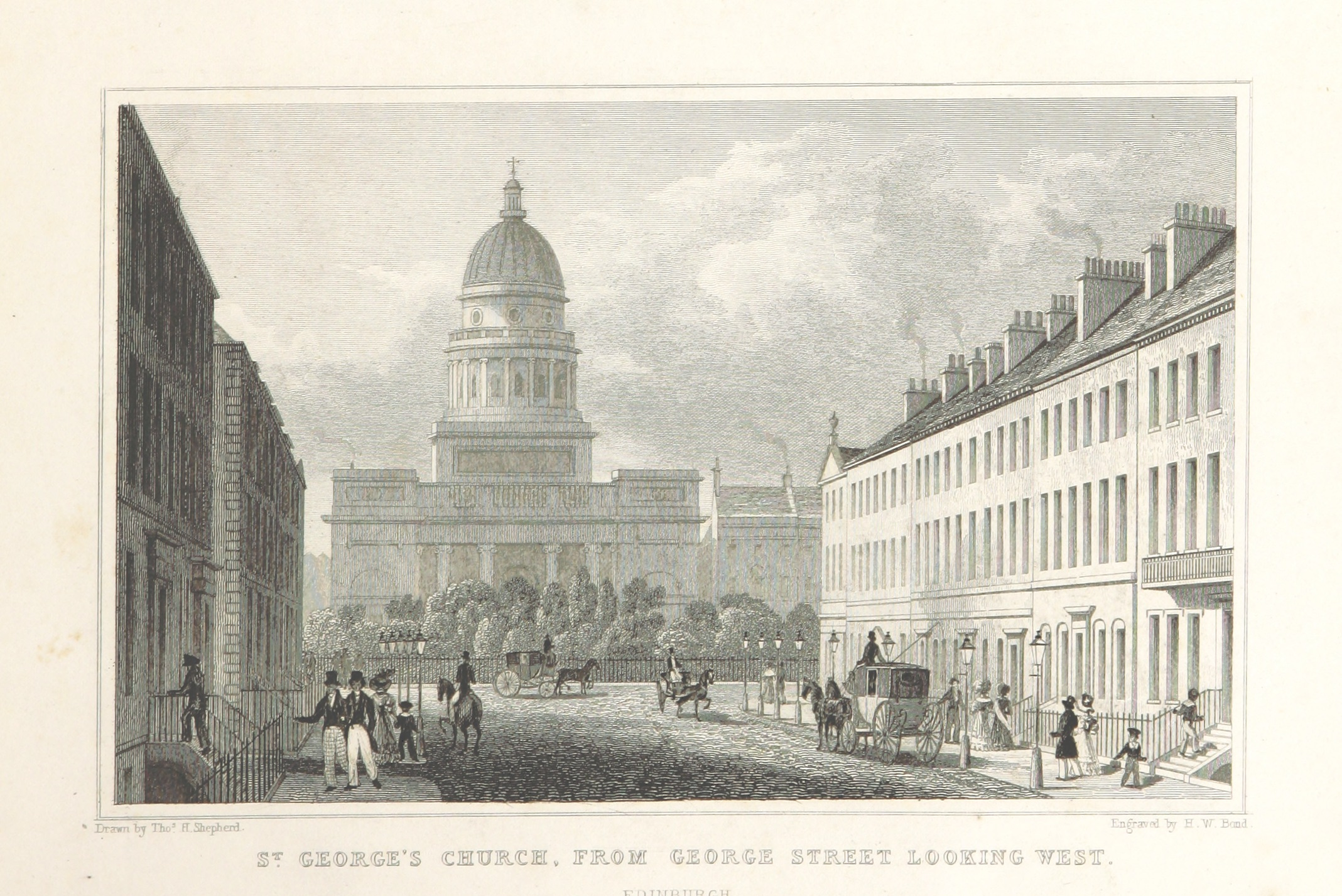
St George's seen from George Street

A.J. Youngson called St George's dome "one of the most notable features of the Edinburgh skyline". The church's dome is prominent in the western half of the first New Town and terminates the view along George Street. St George's occupies a site designated for a church in James Craig's initial plan for the New Town.

Both George Hay and the Buildings of Scotland guide to Edinburgh note that while the building is out of proportion to its surrounding terraces, it forms an effective visual terminus to the view along George Street. Ian Gordon Lindsay and William Forbes Gray also note the church's lack of proportion to Adam’s surrounding buildings. Gray surmises that Reid designed the church relative to the overall size of the square rather than to its neighbouring terraces.

=== Robert Adam's plan ===
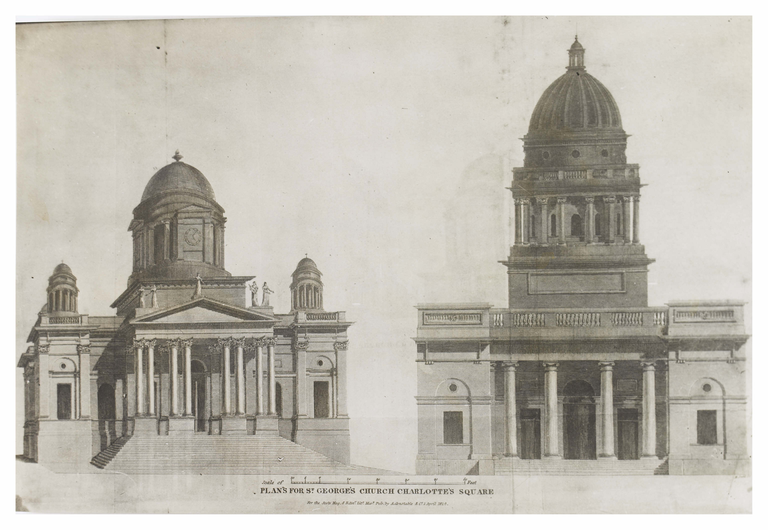
Adam's unexecuted plan for St George's (left) compared to Reid's finished plan (right)

In his plan for Charlotte Square, Robert Adam designed a church for this site. Modelled after St Paul's Cathedral, it was to have an advanced portico with a pediment supported on coupled columns. Pavilions with pilasters on the corners would have flanked this arrangement while supporting small domes on peristyle drums. The central dome would have been similar, albeit shallower and with four pedimented faces on the drum. By the time of St George's construction, concerns over cost and the waning popularity of the Adam style meant a new design was sought from Robert Reid.

=== Exterior ===
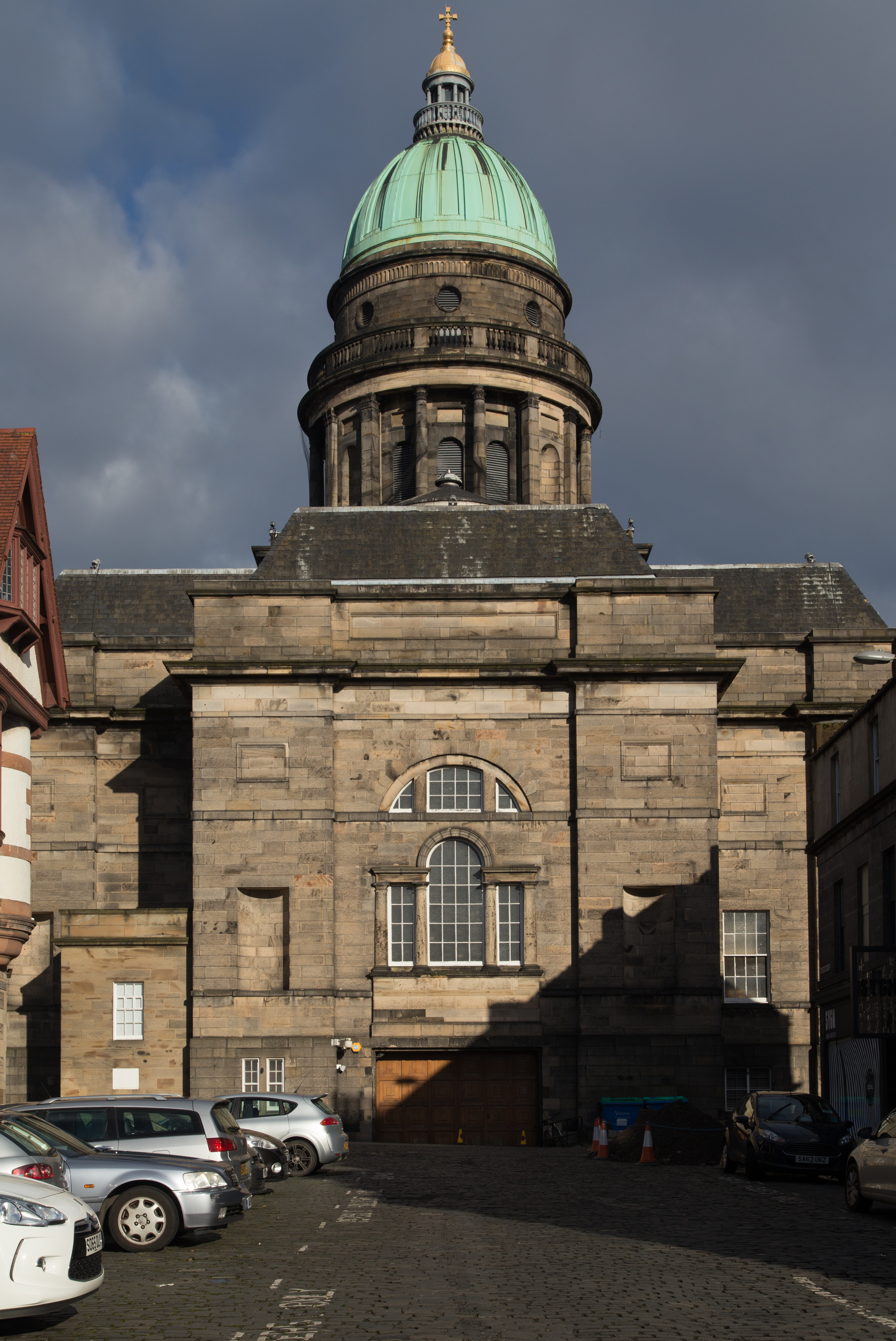
The west elevation of the building, from Randolph Place

The facade of the building, facing onto Charlotte Square, centres on a balustraded portico supported by four Ionic columns in antis and accessed a flight of shallow steps. Within the portico, two rectangular entrances flank an arched entrance. All are filled in with smoked glass, which replaced wooden doors at the time of the building's secularisation.

Two pavilions flank the portico. Each pavilion stands on a base course and contains a rectangular window and oculus within a recessed arch; above this, an empty frieze panel sits between an impost course and the cornice, which is continuous with the portico. The pavilions are topped by panelled attic storeys in line with the balustrade of the portico. Reid's drawings show plans to include clocks within the faces of the attic storeys and to crown the pavilions with statues of female figures. These were never executed. The rear facade of the building, which faces onto Randolph Place, centres on a rear of attenuated pavilions flanking a Diocletian window above a Venetian window. David Bryce drew up plans to add towers to the pavilions. This too was never carried out.

The building's prominent green copper dome and gilded cupola are supported by a two-stage drum. The bottom part of the drum is peristyled with every fourth bay blocked in by a niche. The shorter upper section is pierced with oculi. The drum and dome rise from a stout square base over the former vestibule at the front of the building.

The building's plan is 112 ft (34m) in width and length while its total height is 160 ft (49m). The exterior is constructed of Craigleith sandstone.

=== Interior ===
Prior to conversion, the sanctuary was shaped as a Greek cross. George Hay identifies this as one of only two such plans in Scottish churches of this period: the other is at Carnock in Fife. At the intersection of the cross’ limbs, piers in each corner spanned by coffered segmental arches supported a shallow, coffered dome centring on a circular light. Illumination was also provided by three-light windows in the north, south, and east arms. These same arms housed galleries while the west arm was occupied by the focal point of the pulpit, communion table, and pipe organ.

The church was able to accommodate 1,600 worshippers, the interior was, prior to conversion, relatively plain though distinguished by a large pulpit in Spanish mahogany by William Trotter. This stood at 20 ft (6.1 m) including its canopy, which was removed some time before 1940. The Royal Commission on the Ancient Monuments of Scotland's survey in 1951 found most of the furnishings were then modern while the doors to sanctuary were likely original. The surround of the central door to the sanctuary was fashioned as a memorial after the First World War. These doors connected the sanctuary to a spacious vestibule with gallery stairs. The organ was a two-manual Father Willis installed in 1882 and upgraded to three manuals by the same firm in 1897 and again enlarged by them in 1932. The organ was removed in 1962 and parts of it were reused at St Mary & St Giles Church, Stony Stratford.

The current interior, dating from Robert Saddler's conversion of the building between 1964 and 1970, consists of five storeys. These are accessed via a two-storey entrance hall with mezzanine floor.

=== Criticism ===
Early critics, including The Scots Magazine, drew negative comparisons between Reid's design and Adam's, noting that the latter could have been built for the ultimate cost of Reid's. Victorian critics included John Ruskin, who called it "a most costly and most ugly building", and James Grant, who described the building as "heavy in appearance, meagre in detail, and hideous in conception".

Later writers were more measured. George Hay hailed the facade as a "fine composition" while noting the dome's lack of relation to the rest of the building. He also criticised the interior as "rather an anti-climax". William Forbes Gray described the building as "an impressive reminder that we were once in earnest about churchgoing". A.J. Youngson found harsher criticisms of the building unjust while also concluding "it is certainly a pity the Adam design was not used".

== See also ==
- List of listed buildings in Edinburgh

== Notes ==
=== Bibliography ===
- Dunlop, A. Ian (1988). The Kirks of Edinburgh: 1560–1984. Scottish Record Society. ISBN 0-902054-10-4
- Gifford, John; McWilliam, Colin; Walker, David (1984). The Buildings of Scotland: Edinburgh. Penguin Books. ISBN 0-14-071068-X
- Grant, James (1880). Old and New Edinburgh. II. Cassell's.
- Gray, John G. (1961). The South Side Story. W. F. Knox & Co.
  - Hay, George. "Newington and other Neo-Classic Kirks".
- Gray, William Forbes (1940). Historic Edinburgh Churches. The Moray Press.
- Hay, George (1957). The Architecture of Scottish Post-Reformation Churches: 1560 to 1843. Oxford University Press.
- Lindsay, Ian G. (1948). Georgian Edinburgh. Oliver and Boyd.
- Royal Commission on the Ancient and Historical Monuments of Scotland (1951). An Inventory of the Ancient and Historical Monuments of the City of Edinburgh with the Thirteenth Report of the Commission. His Majesty's Stationery Office.
- Scott, Hew (1915). Fasti Ecclesiae Scoticanae: The Succession of Ministers in the Church of Scotland from the Reformation. Vol. 1. Edinburgh: Oliver and Boyd.
- Youngson, Alexander J. (1966). The Making of Classical Edinburgh. Edinburgh University Press.
