= William Calder =

William Calder may refer to:

== Politicians ==
- William M. Calder (1869–1945), American politician
- William Henderson Calder (fl. 1870s), New Zealand politician
- William Calder (lord provost) (1767–1824), Lord Provost of Edinburgh 1810–11

== Others ==
- William Calder (footballer) (1868–1936), Scottish footballer
- Bill Calder (1934–2021), Scottish footballer
- William Calder (engineer) (1860–1928), from New Zealand
- William Calder (1821–1887), of the Calder baronets

== See also ==
- Calder (disambiguation)
