= Patrick MacDougall =

Patrick MacDougall may refer to:

- Patrick Leonard MacDougall, British Army officer
- Patrick Campbell MacDougall, Scottish minister of the Free Church of Scotland
