= William Coulter (Lord Provost) =

Scottish hosier (1754–1810)

William Colter or Coulter (1754–1810) was a 19th-century Scottish hosier who served as Lord Provost of Edinburgh from 1808 to 1810.

== Life ==
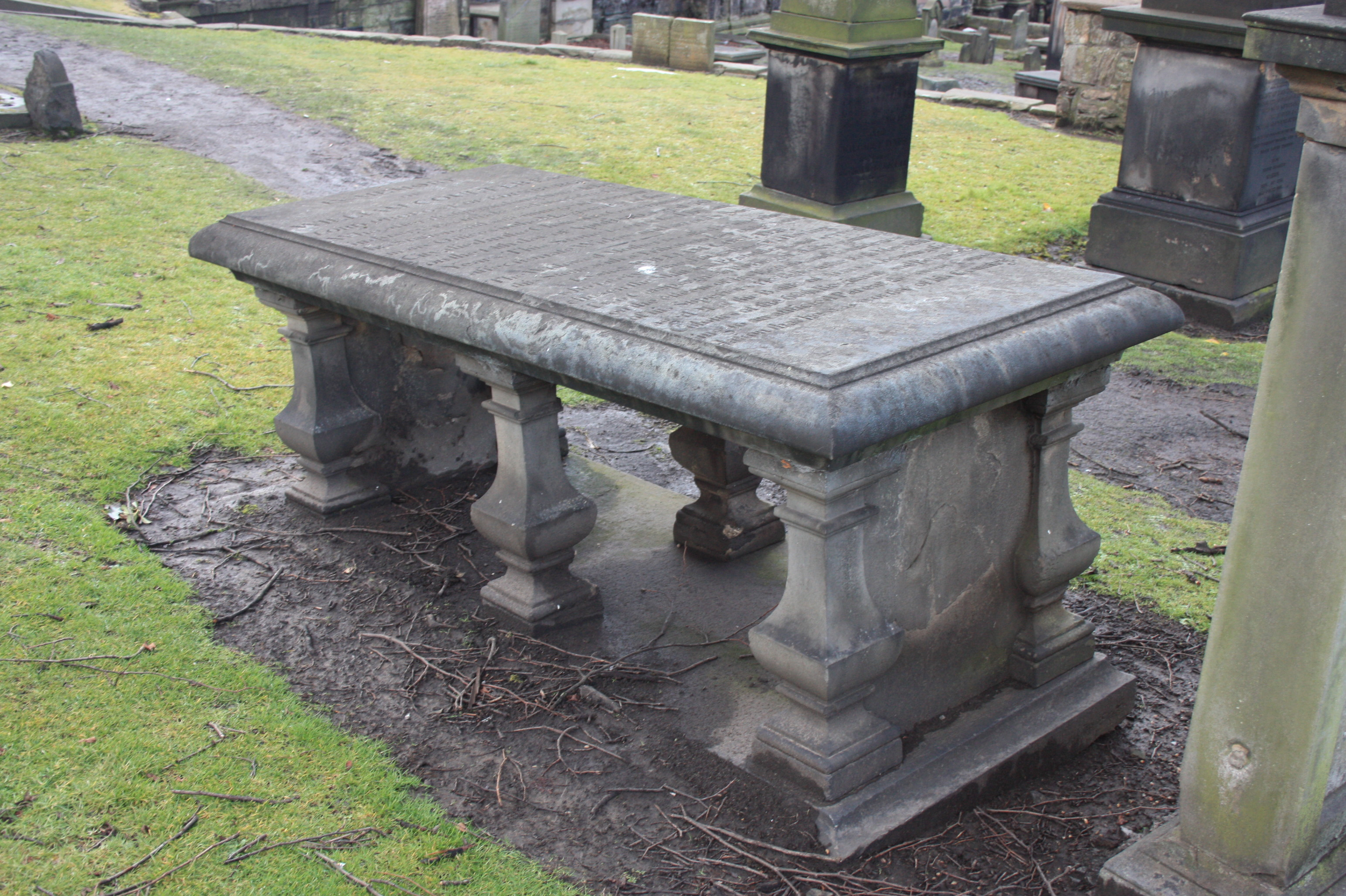
The grave of William Coulter, Greyfriars Kirkyard

He was born in Edinburgh in 1754.

He had a shop and house at the head of Jacksons Close on the Royal Mile (now 217 High Street).

In 1780 he commissioned the building of Morningside Lodge (later renamed Falcon Hall) in the Morningside district. It stood on 7.3 hectares of ground between Canaan Lane and Newbattle Terrace.

He joined Edinburgh Town Council around 1800. Coulter served as Dean of Guild and Lord Provost from 1808 (replacing Donald Smith).

He was ex officio Colonel of the 1st Royal Edinburgh Volunteers (part of the British Volunteer Corps) raised on 26 May 1803 during the Napoleonic Wars). On 8 June 1809, in his capacity as Lord Provost, he laid the foundation stone of the new Edinburgh Asylum in Morningside.

He died in Edinburgh on 14 April 1810. He is buried in Greyfriars Kirkyard in Edinburgh.

He died in office as Lord Provost and was succeeded by William Calder, Lord Provost of Edinburgh His house, Morningside Lodge was acquired by Alexander Falconer and renamed Falcon Hall, being remodelled by Thomas Hamilton in 1815. The house was last occupied by John George Bartholomew in 1909, when it was demolished. Its gatepiers were re-used at Edinburgh Zoo and its portico was re-used at Bartholomew's offices on Duncan Street in the Newington district.

== Artistic recognition ==
He was caricatured by J Jenkins of Edinburgh around 1805 whilst still a Bailie.
