= William Aird Thomson =

Scottish minister and antiquarian

William Aird Thomson (1773-17 March 1863) was a Scottish minister and antiquarian who served as Moderator of the General Assembly of the Church of Scotland in 1835.

== Life ==
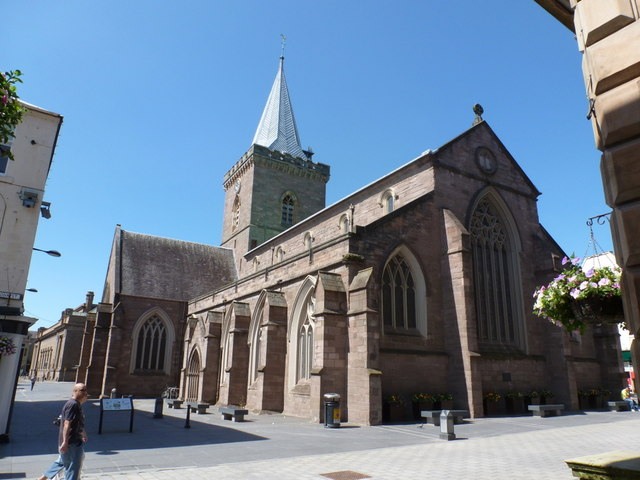
St John's Kirk in central Perth which housed the Middle Church

He was born on 28 January 1773 in the manse at Sanquhar the son of Rev Dr John Thomson DD. The family moved to Markinch while he was still young.

He studied at the University of Edinburgh and was licensed to preach by the Presbytery of Kirkcaldy in September 1796.

He was ordained by the Church of Scotland as minister of Dalziel in September 1801, then moved in 1808 to the far larger Middle Church in Perth in 1807. The parish was at that time one of three contained within the large St John's Church in the city centre. At the same time his brother Rev Andrew Thomson was translated from Sprouston to the East Church in Perth contained in the east end of the same building. However, Andrew translated to New Greyfriars in Edinburgh in 1810.

In 1833 the University of Glasgow. awarded him an honorary doctorate (DD). In 1835 he succeeded Very Rev Patrick McFarlan as Moderator of the General Assembly.

In the Disruption of 1843 he left the established Church of Scotland and joined the Free Church of Scotland, establishing a new Free Church of Perth. He went into semi-retirement in 1845 when Rev Thomas Dymock came to assist him.

He died at home, 6 Athole Crescent in Perth on 17 March 1863.

== Family ==
In March 1802 he was married to Margaret Fraser (d.1844), daughter of Luke Fraser the infamous master at Edinburgh's High School. In 1841 their daughter Mary Anne Thomson married Walter Glass of Smiddiegreen who committed suicide by shooting himself in the head two months after the wedding. She then married Prof Patrick Campbell MacDougall.

Her sister Helen Mary Thomson married Prof Patrick Campbell Macdougall of the University of Edinburgh.

The daughter Margaret Thomson married Rev John Reid Omond.

Other children included Gilbert James Thomson (b. 1813) and Rev John William Thomson of the Free Church.

His younger brother was Rev Andrew Mitchell Thomson.

== Publications ==
- A History of the Circulation of the Scriptures (1814) with "Mr Orme"
- Memoirs of the Late Rev James Scott (1820)
- John Campbell of Carbrook (1827)
- Letters on Church Politics (1832-6)
- Questions for Young Communicants
- A Catechism on the Gospel of St Luke
