= Donald Smith (banker) =

Donald Smith (c.1740–1808?) was a Scottish banker who served as Lord Provost of Edinburgh.

== Life ==
In 1760 he was a partner in Johnston & Smith, a small firm operating in financial circles, which fell in a collapse of 1772.

In 1773 he formed the bank Donald Smith & Son.

In 1807 he was elected Lord Provost of Edinburgh in place of Sir William Fettes. In Edinburgh he lived at 10 Chapel Street in the south of the city (just off George Square)and traded from the Royal Exchange on the Royal Mile. He was succeeded in 1808 by William Coulter as Lord Provost. His term of office saw various extensions agreed to the Second New Town including areas around Calton Hill such as Regent Terrace and Royal Terrace.

In 1831 the bank merged with Thomas Kinnear & Son to form Kinnear, Smiths & Co. However the bank closed with huge debts in 1834 due to poor speculation by Donald's brother, James Smith, in London. The assets and partial liabilities were taken over by the Bank of Scotland and British Linen Bank.

Smith's daughter Barbara Smith married Rev Dr James Peddie of the Bristo Chapel in Edinburgh and had nine children including William Peddie.
