= General Register House =

The General Register House
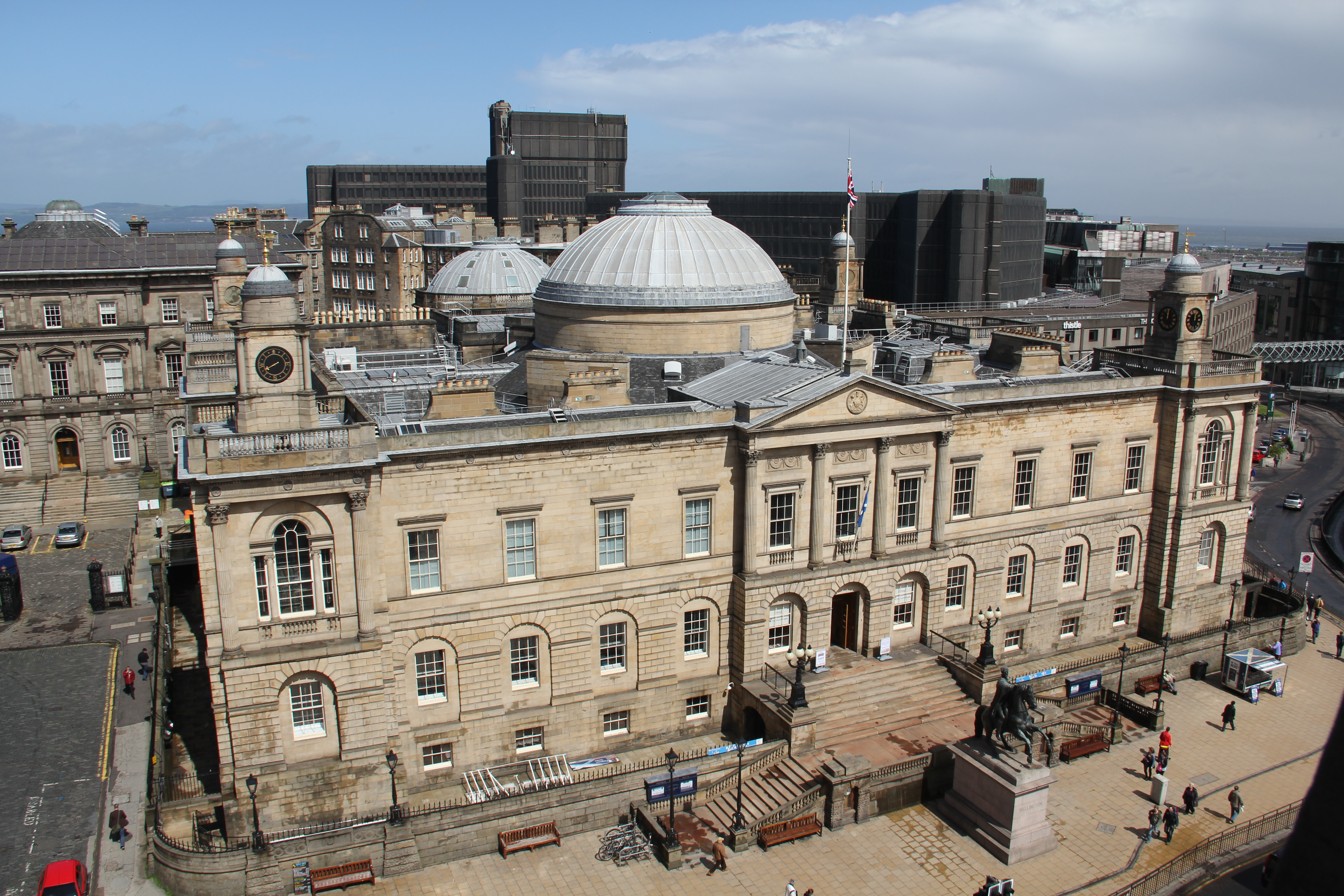
- The General Register House

- Shown in Edinburgh
- 55.9538°N 3.1893°W
- Location: Princes Street, Edinburgh,

History
- Built: 1788

Site notes
- Architect: Robert Adam
- Architectural style: Neoclassical style

Listed Building – Category A
- Official name: Princes Street, General Register House with area walls and steps to front
- Designated: 14 December 1970
- Reference no.: LB27636

General Register House is an Adam style neoclassical building on Princes Street, Edinburgh, purpose built by Robert Adam between 1774 and 1788 as the headquarters of the National Archives of Scotland. It is a Category A listed building.

The premises is the official office of both the Lord Clerk Register, Lord Keeper of the Privy Seal and Lord Lyon King of Arms.

== Background ==
Scottish records of importance were previously held in Edinburgh Castle. A building near the Great Hall constructed for James V between 1538 and 1542 became known as the Register House, and was one of the earliest purpose-built state archives in Europe.

Around 1760, James Douglas, 14th Earl of Morton in his capacity as Lord Clerk Register proposed a new building in the newly proposed New Town of Edinburgh. He got the government to allot £12,000 from forfeited estates of the Jacobites and investing this the sum – plus interest – proved enough to commence the project. In 1765, Robert Adam was commissioned to design this major work. The foundation stone was laid on 27 June 1774 by Lord Frederick Campbell, Lord Register of Scotland. Thomas Miller of Barskimming, the Lord Justice Clerk, and James Montgomery, the Lord Advocate were his co-trustees in ensuring the progress of the project. The site architect was Robert's brother John Adam and James Salisbury was the Clerk of Works. The master masons in charge of the construction were John Wilson and David Henderson, using stone from Craigleith and Hailes quarries in Edinburgh. The clock and weather vane were built by Benjamin Vulliamy.

By 1803 the building was incomplete but was already concluded as inadequate in scale. In 1813 Archibald Elliot redesigned the front to conceal a new basement area, not in the original design. In 1822 Robert Reid was commissioned to redesign the north section to be more commodious and this section was eventually completed in 1834, sixty years after the project began.

== Architecture ==
The building is a quadrangle in shape, built in ashlar of polished cream-coloured sandstone, with two storeys and a raised basement. The ground floor, and both storeys of the pavilions, are arcaded with timber-framed sash windows of twelve panes and decorated with a base course and an impost course. On the first floor storey is a cill course, a cornice, and a blocking course. The corners and the centre of each of the sides has a projecting taller pavilion consisting of one bay, with one window on each storey, with those at the building's corner topped with a square base supporting a cupola and freestanding columns at each angle. The corner towers at the front carry a weather vane and a clock; while the corresponding openings on the towers at the rear are blind. In the central courtyard is a circular reading room under a dome.

The front elevation consists of thirteen architectural bays, of which the outermost one at each end, ornamented by a balustrade, comprise the advanced pavilions at the corners. Each of the corner pavilions has on the upper storey a single Venetian window with Ionic columns in a recessed round arch and framed by Corinthian columns. The other windows on the upper storey are decorated with architraves and cornices, while those three that are above the central portico have balustrades and consoled cornices. Beneath the upper and lower storeys, the building is of rusticated ashlar to the ground level. The entrance, in the centre of the front, is approached by an imperial staircase and framed by a tetrastyle portico of the Corinthian order. Decorative panels in Liardet's stucco with festoon motifs decorate the wall above the portico, while the royal coat of arms of the United Kingdom decorates the pediment.

At the rear of the original building, the portico's place in the centre is taken by a five-bay centrepiece, with arcaded windows on the lower storey and corniced and pedimented windows alternating on the upper floor. The roof is of slate and of piended contraction, though the roof of the central dome is of lead. Inside, the dome was plastered by Thomas Clayton to neoclassical designs by Adam made in 1785. Robert Reid designed the metal gates that enter the rotunda under the dome. There are staircases in the east and west ends of the building, each now fitted with a lift shaft. The Lord Clerk Register's room is behind the entrance portico, adorned with a frieze and a chimneypiece in grey marble. Beyond the rotunda is "Historical Search Room", previously the "Antiquarian Room", a two-storey timber-galleried room of bookcases with a coffered ceiling with rosettes.

== Wellington Statue ==
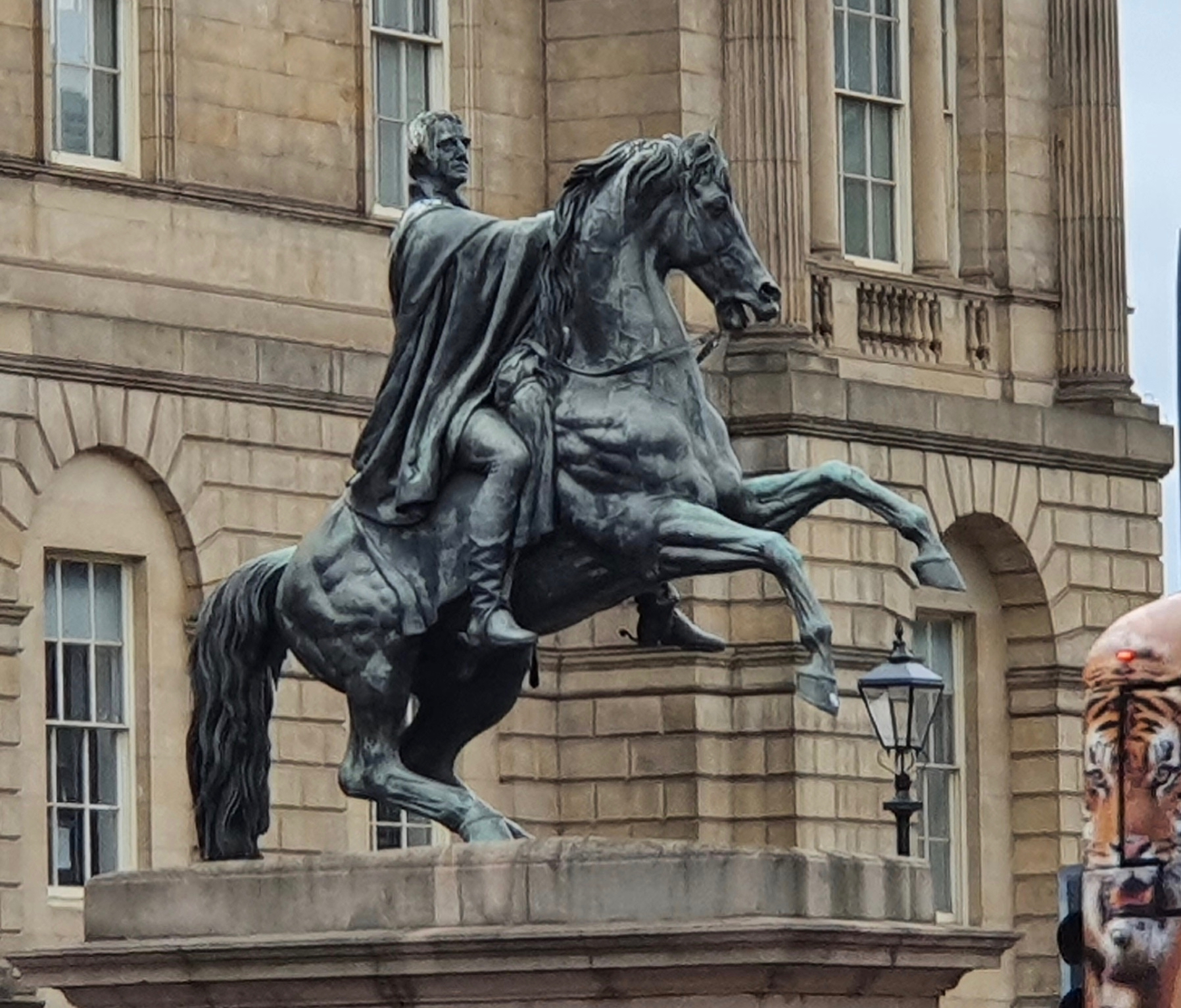
Equestrian statue of the Duke of Wellington, in front of General Register House

The highly emotive statue of the Duke of Wellington, mounted on a rearing horse, and pointing with significance to Waterloo Place to the east, was erected in 1852, designed by Sir John Steell. Surviving Scottish soldiers who had fought at the Battle of Waterloo were invited to the unveiling ceremony.

== Restoration ==
In 1969, the stonework was cleaned by abrasive blasting. The plasterwork in the dome was repainted in 1973–4. The entrance hall was restored and adapted in 1993, and a new chimneypiece installed. In 2008 the statue of George III by Anne Seymour Damer was restored, and the dome salon was repainted following research by Historic Environment Scotland according to the original 1790 paint scheme of stone colour and white.

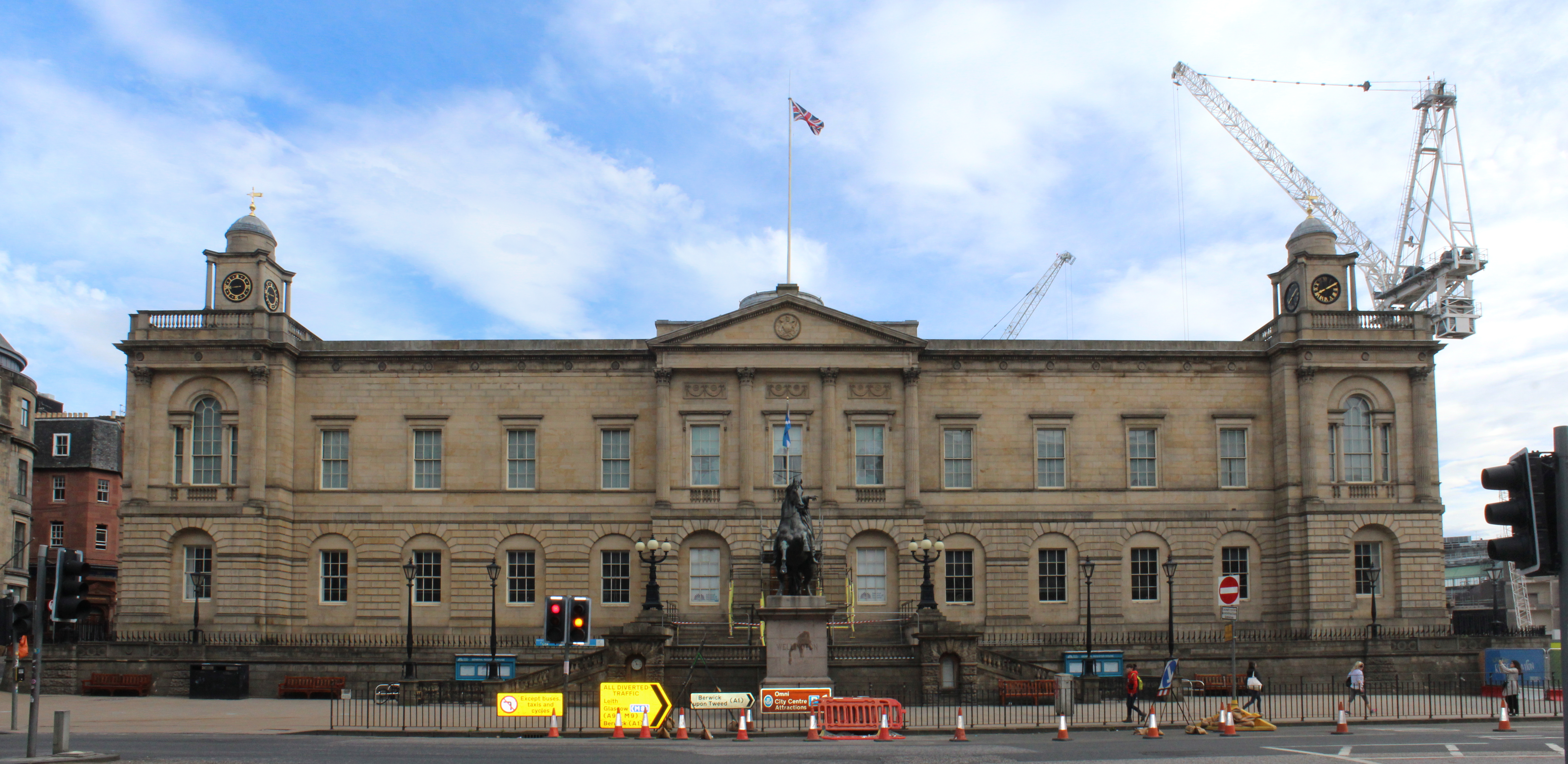
Front elevation, showing John Steell's statue of Arthur Wellesley, 1st Duke of Wellington riding Copenhagen

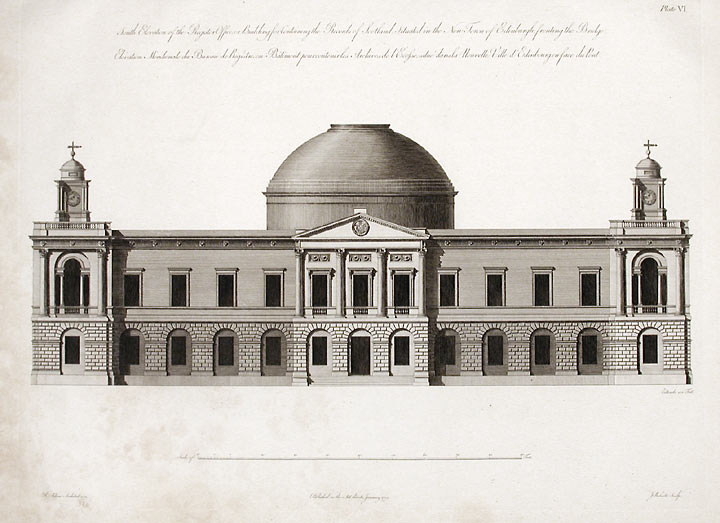
Plan

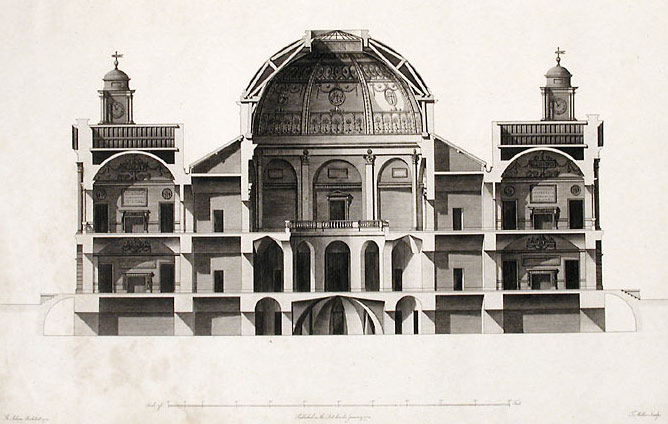
Cross-section plan

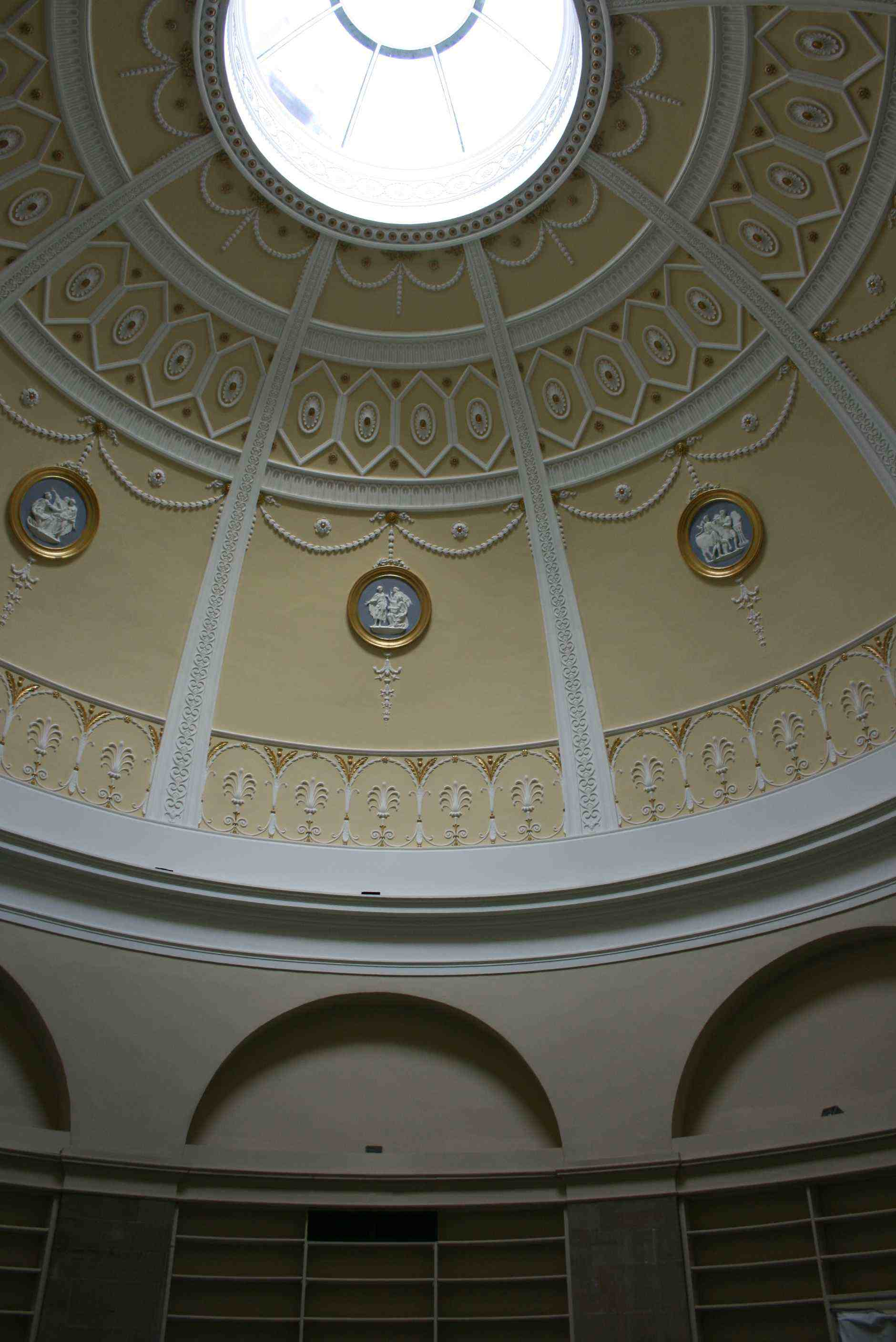
The dome salon in 2008

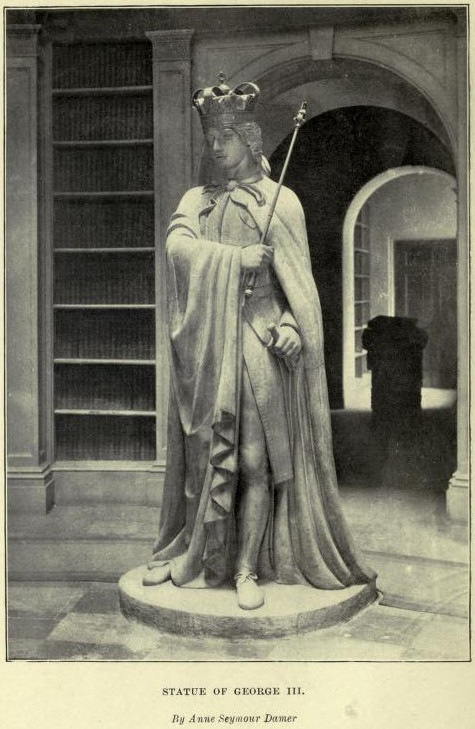
Statue of George III by Anne Seymour Damer as formerly placed in the dome salon

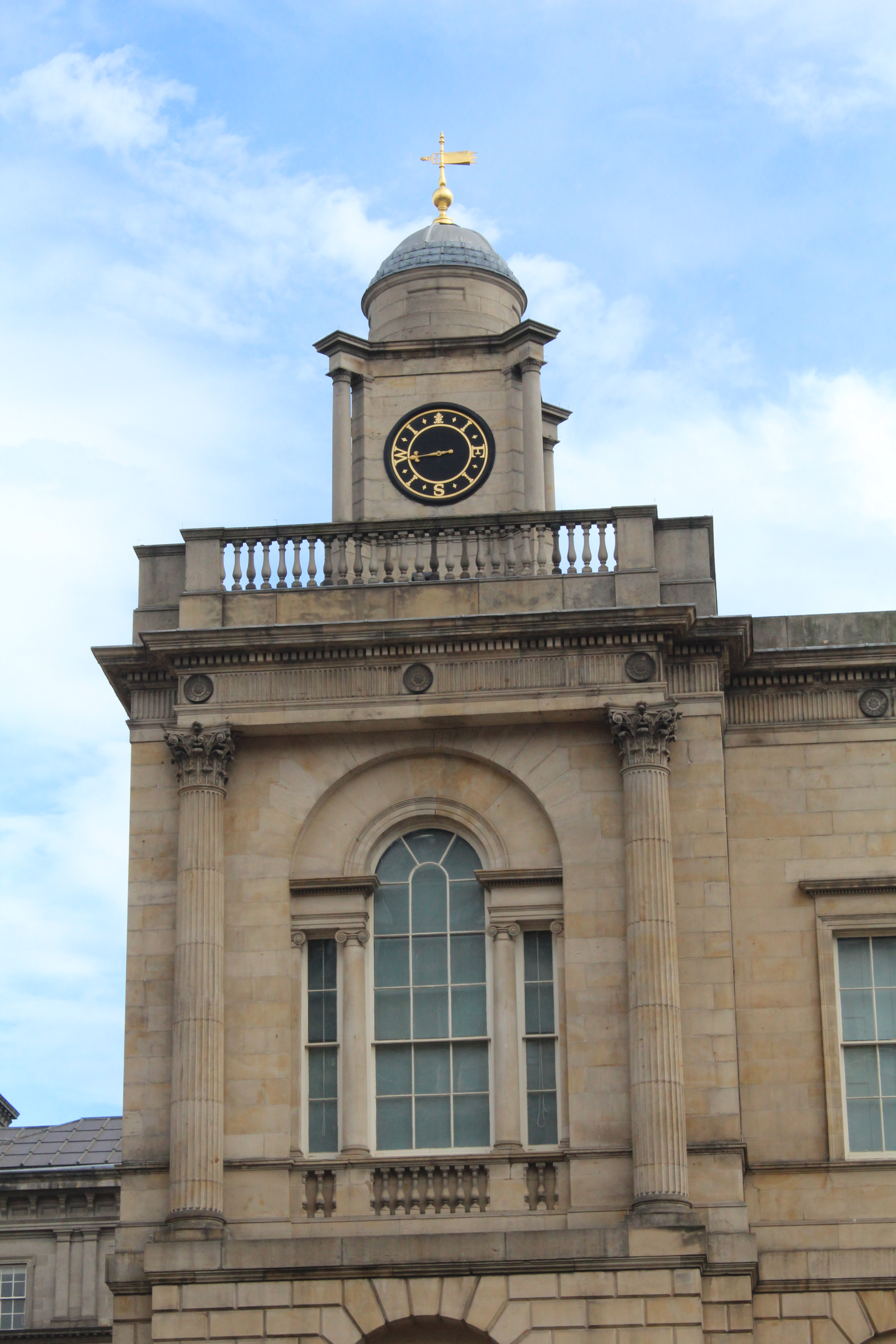
South west corner pavilion with weather vane

== See also ==
- List of Category A listed buildings in the New Town, Edinburgh
