= Charles William Gray Taylor =

Scottish minister

Charles William Gray Taylor CBE
- Moderator of the General Assembly
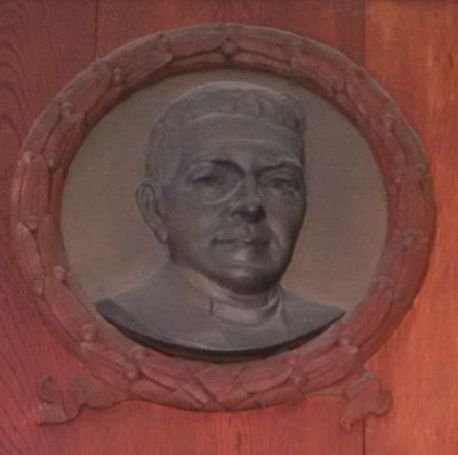
- Depiction of CWG Taylor on a memorial plaque
- Church: Church of Scotland
- In office: 1942 to 1943

Personal details
- Born: 5 February 1879
- Died: 21 September 1950 (aged 71)
- Denomination: Presbyterianism

Charles William Gray Taylor CBE (5 February 1879 – 21 September 1950) was a Scottish minister who served as Moderator of the General Assembly of the Church of Scotland in 1942/3.

== Life ==
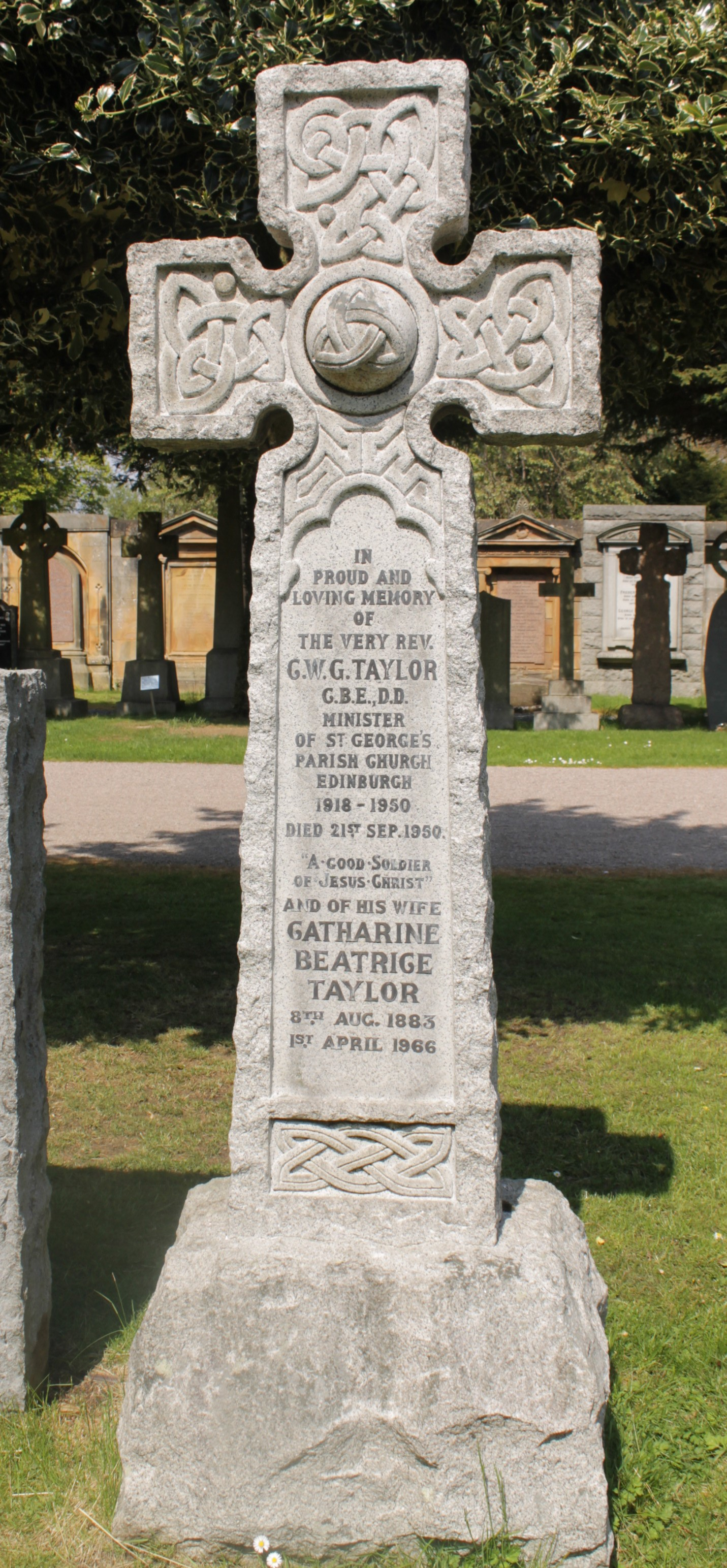
The grave of Taylor, Dean Cemetery

Taylor was born in Edinburgh in 1879 to mason Alexander Taylor and Jane Davidson Taylor. Before the First World War, he was minister of Uddingston church. In the First World War (1916/17) he was an Army Chaplain. In 1918, he was translated to St George's Church, on Charlotte Square in Edinburgh's New Town.

In 1928 he became Convenor of the Foreign Mission Committee to the Church of Scotland. In 1933 the University of Edinburgh awarded him an honorary doctorate (DD).

One of his most important roles as Moderator was his presence at the re-inauguration of St Paul's Cathedral in London in September 1942 alongside the Archbishop of Canterbury, following the cathedral's bomb damage in 1941.

In 1945 he was elected Grand Master of the Grand Lodge of Free and Accepted Masons. In 1946/47 he was Chairman of a Committee looking at Rehabilitation of Young Offenders and was also involved in reforms in the Scottish Prison System in 1948/49.

He was appointed a Commander of the Order of the British Empire (CBE) in the 1950 Birthday Honours

He died on 21 September 1950. He is buried in Dean Cemetery the grave lies in the south-east section not far from the main entrance.

== Family ==
He was married to Catherine Beatrice Taylor (1883–1966) who is buried with him. She wrote a biography of her husband entitled "Taylor of St George's: A Memoir of C W G Taylor" which was published in 1967 after her death.

== Gallery ==
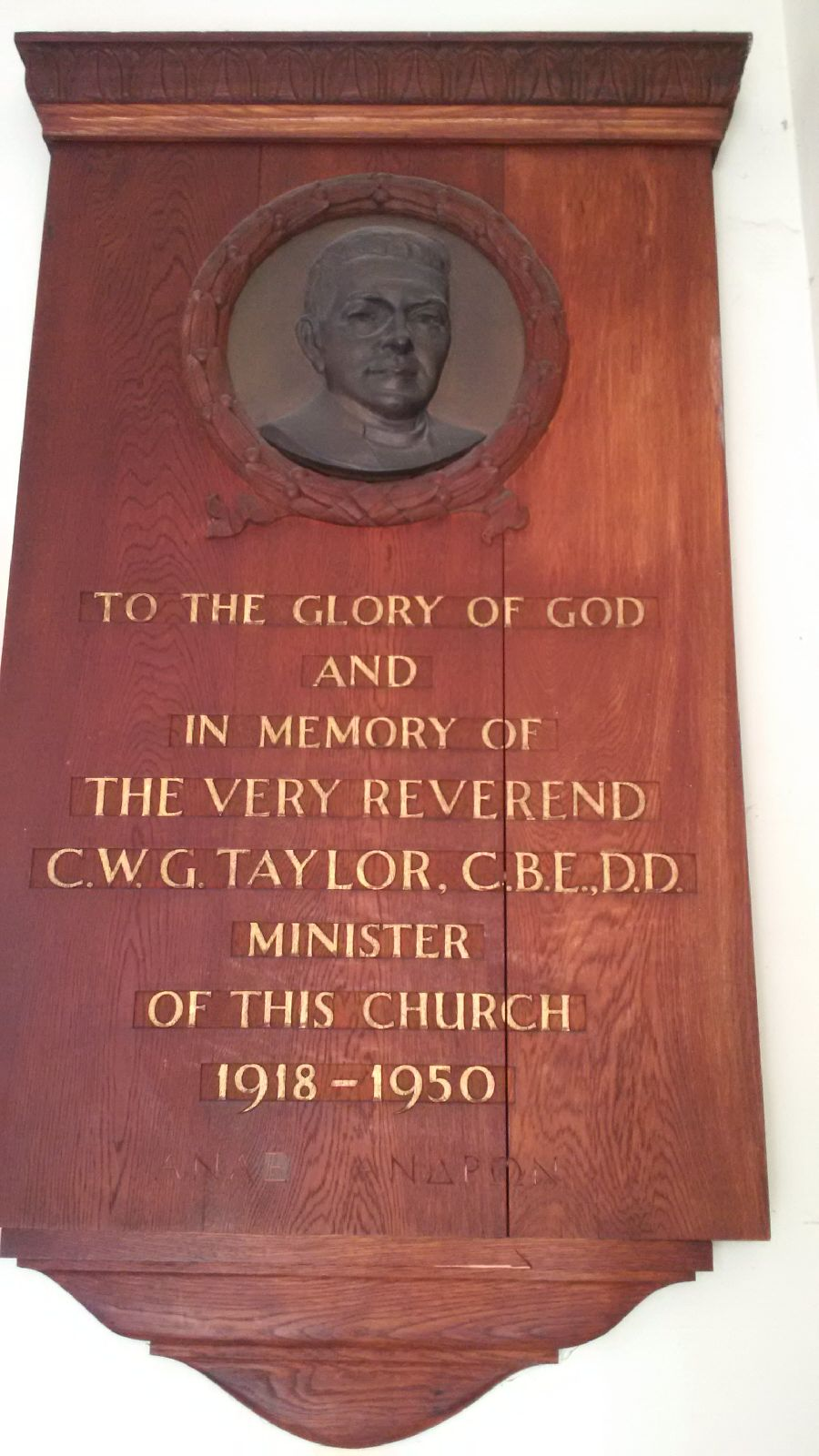
Memorial plaque to Taylor

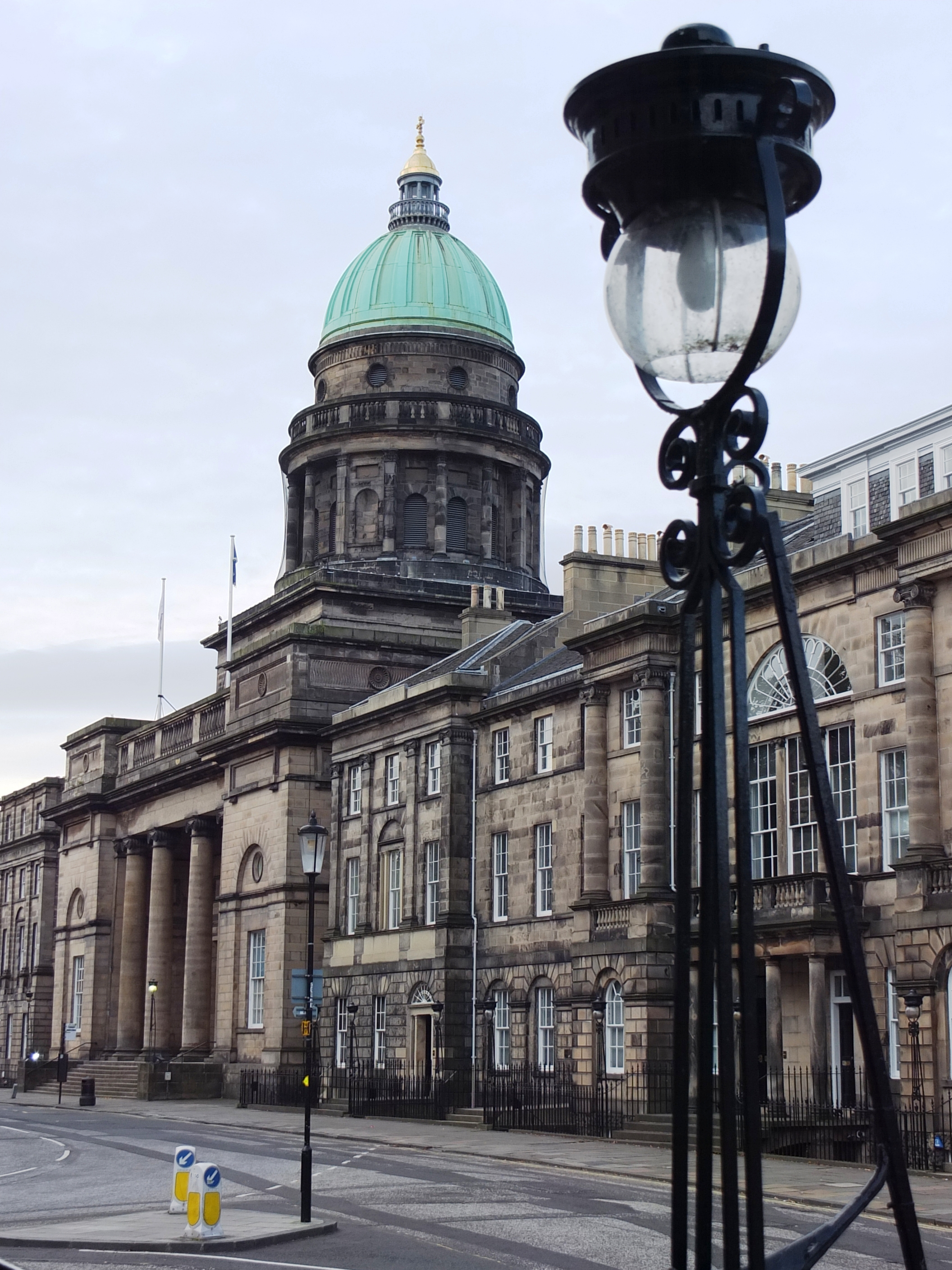
St George's Church, Charlotte Square Edinburgh (now West Register House)
