= John Thomson (composer) =

Scottish classical composer

John Thomson (28 October 1805 – 18 May 1841) was a Scottish classical composer. He was born in Sprouston, Roxburghshire, the son of Andrew Mitchell Thomson, the minister of Sprouston Church.

Portrait of John Thomson by William Smellie Watson

== Life and career ==
Thomson studied in Germany with a letter of introduction to the Mendelssohn family, and his Drei Lieder were published in Leipzig in 1838. John Purser contends that we have to look to Schumann to find anything comparable to these songs published two years before Schumann composed any songs in his mature style. The first song, Keiner von den Schönheit Töchtern, is based on the poem There be none of beauty's daughters by Byron, set in German by Thomson to match the other songs.

Thomson became the first Reid Professor of Music at the University of Edinburgh in 1838. As a musicologist he edited the Vocal Melodies of Scotland, and he was one of the first conductors to provide his audience with a programme of his concerts giving a critical analysis of the works to be performed. His other compositions included a fine bagatelle for solo piano, a six-part Glee With Whispering Winds, three operas, a flute concerto and a flute quartet, and concert arias. However his career was cut short by his death in 1841.

Among Thompson's compositions admired by his younger contemporary Felix Mendelssohn when they met in Edinburgh in the summer of 1829 was a G minor piano trio of 1826, in which stormy and sometimes fierce passages are mixed with Schubertian warmth. Another favourite of Mendelssohn's was his lively rondo of 1828. They became friends and Fanny Mendelssohn is cited as saying that she liked Thomson "best of all the Britons I know". Thomson's C major trio is described as a fine work.

Subsequently, his work was little performed, but it was featured in John Purser's Scotland's Music series, and a group of people in Kelso organised a bicentennial festival in 2005. Scores of some of John Thomson's compositions are available on the website of the International Music Score Library Project.
