= William Forbes Gray =

Scottish journalist and author

William Forbes Gray FRSE (1874–1950) was a Scottish journalist and author. In authorship he is usually referred to as W. Forbes Gray. He wrote extensively on Sir Walter Scott.

== Life ==
He was born 14 April 1874. In 1894 he began working at the Edinburgh Evening News. In 1898 he moved to be News Editor of the British Weekly. In 1905 he became Sub-Editor of the Scottish Review.

In 1918 he was elected a Fellow of the Royal Society of Edinburgh. His proposers were Walter Biggar Blaikie, Robert Taylor Skinner, James Haig Ferguson and David Fowler Lowe.

He died on 12 May 1950.

== Publications ==
- Books that Count: A Dictionary of Standard Books (1912)
- Some Old Scots Judges (1914)
- The Poets Laureate in England: Their History and Their Odes (1915)
- A Brief History of the Scottish Union & National Insurance Company (1924)
- Sir Walter Scott Quarterly (a short-lived periodical) (1927–28)
- Scott in Sunshine and in Shadow (1931)
- The Scott Centenary Handbook: A Guide to Edinburgh, Abbotsford and Rob Roy Country (1932)
- An Eighteenth Century Riding School (1935)
- General Index to the Book of the Old Edinburgh Club (1936)
- The Royal Exchange and other City Improvements (1938)
- Comments and Characters (1940)
- The Lands of Newington and Their Owners (1942)
- Notes on the History of Pilton (1945)
