= William Calder (lord provost) =

Scottish merchant and Lord Provost of Edinburgh (died 1824)

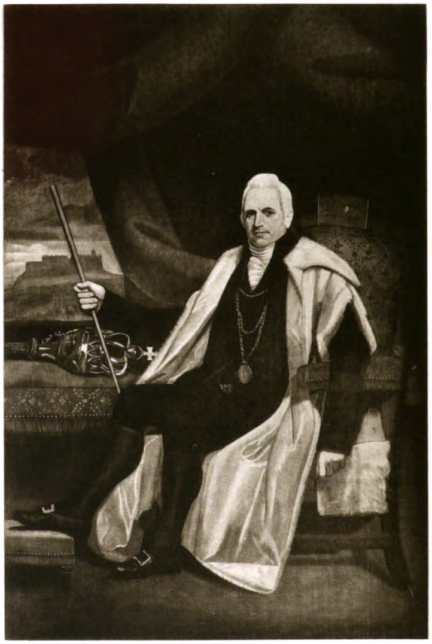
- William Calder, Lord Provost, from the portrait reproduced in Wood's The Lord Provosts of Edinburgh (1932)

Lord Provost of Edinburgh
- In office 1810–1811
- Preceded by: William Coulter
- Succeeded by: William Creech

Dean of Guild of Edinburgh
- In office 1806–1808

Personal details
- Died: 19 August 1824 Edinburgh, Scotland
- Occupation: Merchant

William Calder (died 1824) was a Scottish merchant who served as Lord Provost of Edinburgh from 1810 to 1811. He had earlier held the burgh office of Dean of Guild from 1806 to 1808, and sat on Edinburgh Town Council from 1802.

== Civic career ==
Calder became a member of Edinburgh Town Council in 1802 and a bailie in 1803. From 1806 to 1808 he was Dean of Guild, the chief officer of the burgh's Guildry, who presided over the Dean of Guild Court. (Note: Wood uses the older Scots spelling "Dean of Gild".) Calder was a member of the Company of Merchants of the City of Edinburgh. His name appears in a list of more than a hundred merchants present at the Merchants' Hall in 1806 that was reprinted in the London press. During 1810 and 1811 he was an Assistant of the Merchant Company of Edinburgh; the Guildry and the Merchant Company were separate bodies with separate records.

== Lord Provost ==
Calder was elected Lord Provost in 1810 on the death in office of his predecessor, William Coulter, serving first the remainder of Coulter's year and then a term of his own to 1811. He was succeeded by the publisher William Creech.

Three undertakings of 1811 are recorded with which Calder was connected ex officio. The beginning of the Observatory on Calton Hill dates from that year, as does a second wet dock at Leith, the foundation of which was laid in March. In May 1811 Calder laid the foundation stone of St George's Church in Charlotte Square, after which the Lord Provost and council walked in procession to the Royal Exchange to establish themselves in the new Council Chamber there, in the building later known as the City Chambers.

Outside the council Calder was a manager of the Public Dispensary and a director of the Scottish Bible Society.

== Family and death ==
The marriage of Calder's daughter Ann to William Marshall was announced in the London press in 1811.

Wood states that Calder survived until 1824, and this is supported by a September 1824 entry in the Scottish press. The exact date of his death, according to the inventory of his personal estate given up in the Edinburgh Sheriff Court and presented on 18 February 1825, was 19 August 1824.

== Portrait ==
The portrait of Lord Provost William Calder was reproduced as a plate in Wood's 1932 volume, where the caption records that it was presented to the Corporation by the family of Mrs David Marshall.

== Works cited ==
- "[Report from Edinburgh]". British Press. London. 15 October 1808. p. 4 – via British Newspaper Archive.
- "Merchants' Hall". Oracle and the Daily Advertiser. London. 28 June 1806. p. 2 – via British Newspaper Archive.
- "[Death notice]". Perthshire Courier. Perth. 3 September 1824. p. 4 – via British Newspaper Archive.
- "[Marriage announcement]". Pilot. London. 12 March 1811. p. 4 – via British Newspaper Archive.
- Wood, Marguerite (1932). The Lord Provosts of Edinburgh, 1296–1932. Edinburgh: Printed for Sir T. B. Whitson by T. & A. Constable. OCLC 4248628.

Civic offices
Preceded by William Coulter	Lord Provost of Edinburgh; 1810–1811	Succeeded by William Creech
