= Robert Reid (architect) =

Scottish architect (1774–1856)

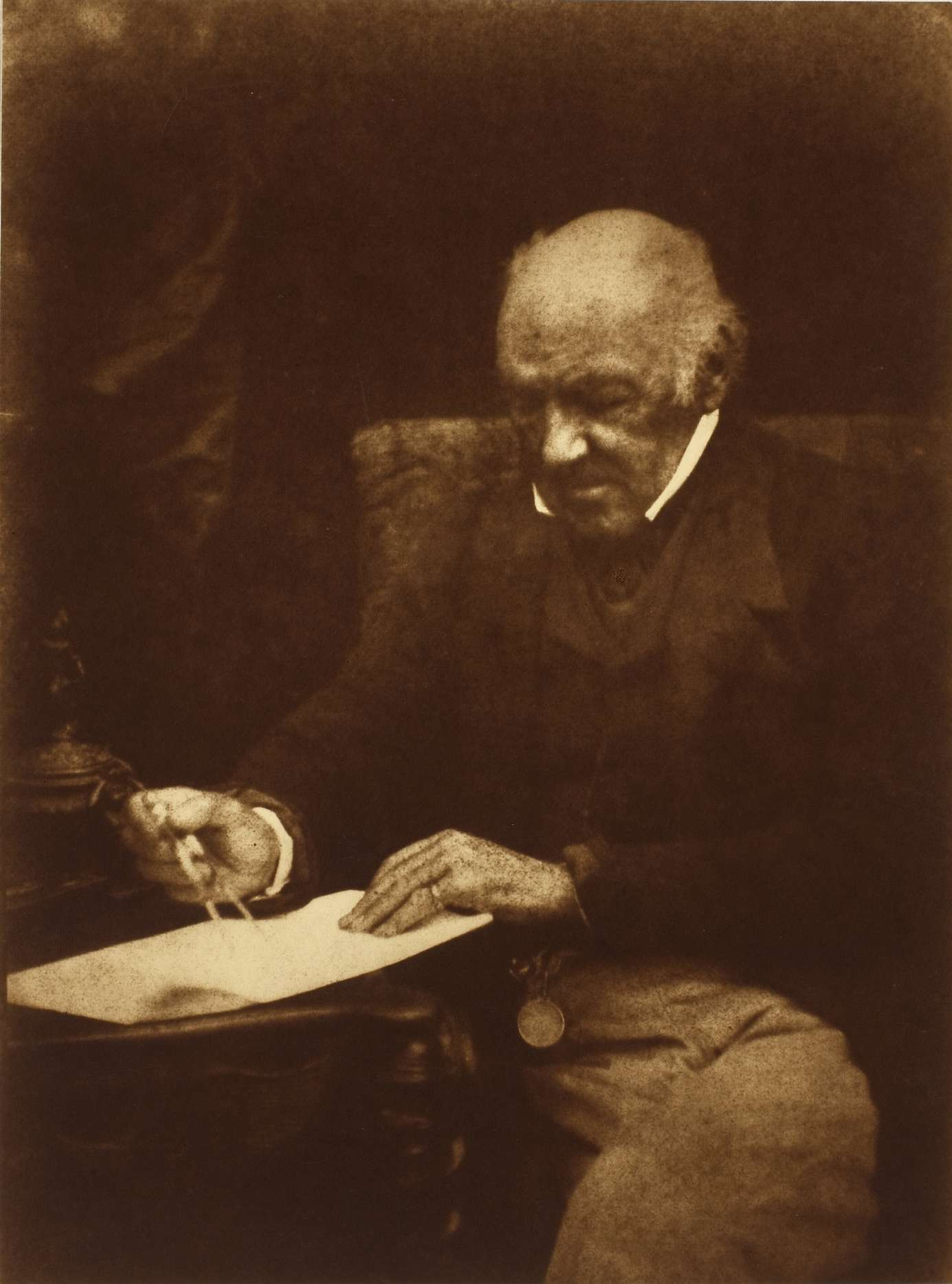
- Robert Reid in 1847, by Hill & Adamson.
- Born: 8 November 1774
- Died: 20 March 1856 (aged 81)
- Occupation: Architect
- Buildings: façade of Parliament Square
- Projects: New Town

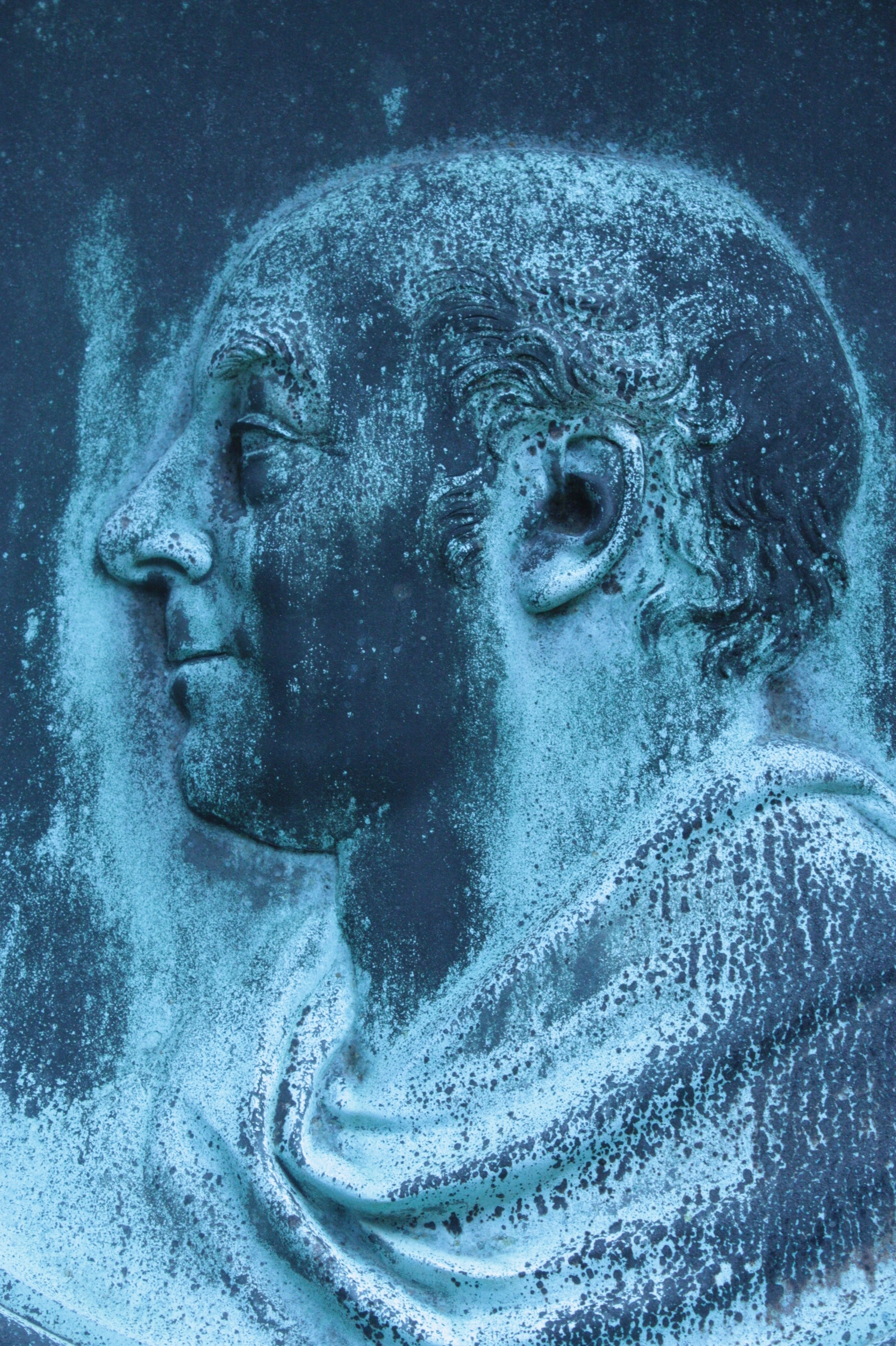
Robert Reid plaque

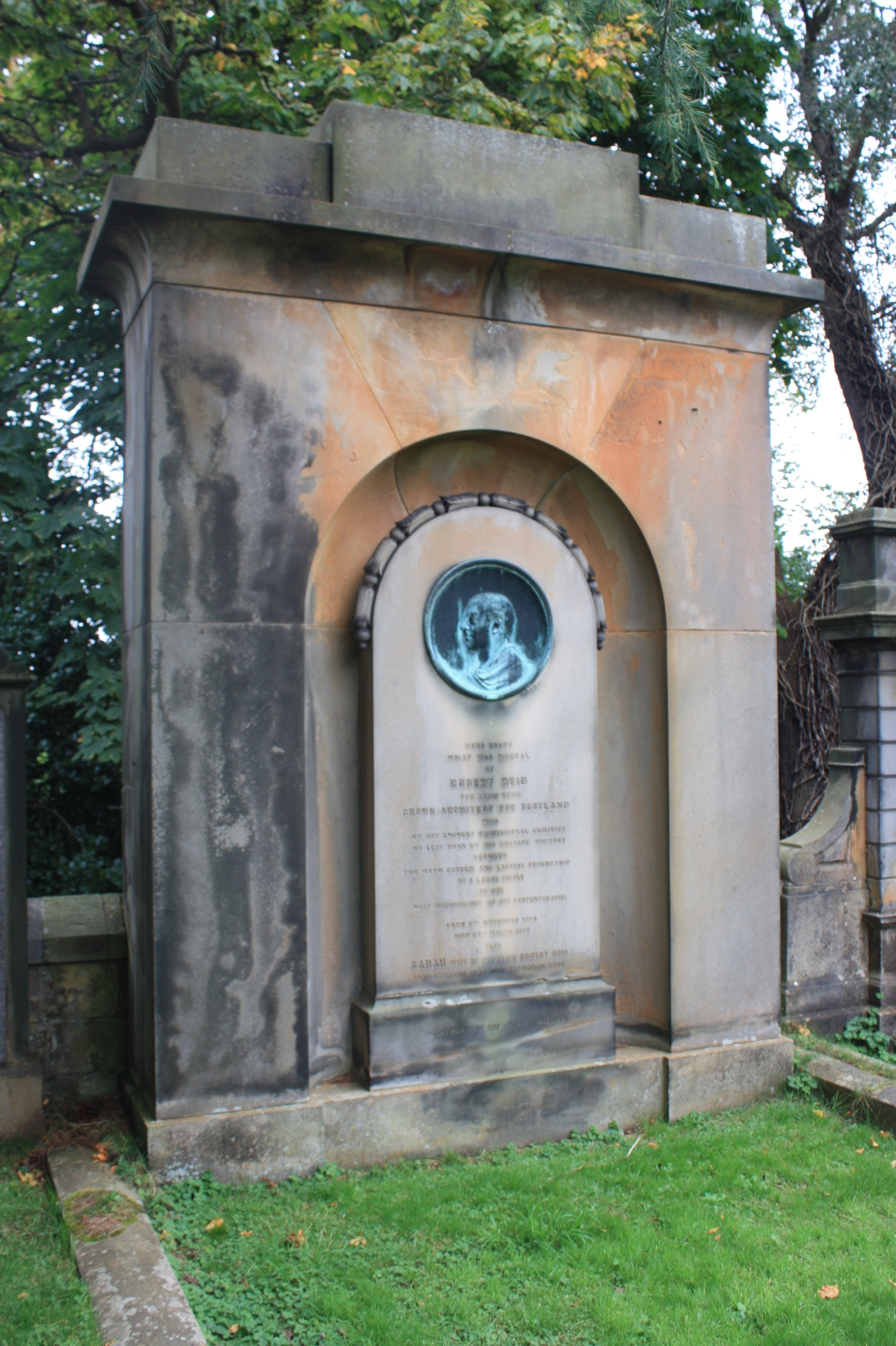
Robert Reid monument, Dean Cemetery

Robert Reid (8 November 1774 – 20 March 1856) was the King's architect and surveyor for Scotland from 1827 to 1839. He is responsible for a number of public works particularly the façade of Parliament Square in Edinburgh, which houses the Court of Session. Stylistically he was heavily influenced by Robert Adam, but Reid's style is more austere. The style is now seen as the main character of the northern (less altered) Edinburgh New Town.

From 1802 to 1809 he assisted the much older William Sibbald in the design of the Second New Town in Edinburgh, largely being responsible for the facades.

Reid also contributed to the layout of Charlotte Square in the city following fellow architect Robert Adam's death, constructing a home for himself there (No. 44) and completing the design for West Register House (formerly St George's Church). In 1802 he went on to contribute to the planning of the northern part of Edinburgh's New Town and in 1834 further revisited Adam's works in extending Register House.

He was the last person to hold the title of "Master of Work to the Crown of Scotland" a title which died with his retiral. He helped to create its replacement, where responsibility fell to a group rather than an individual, the Scottish Office of Works, which was created in 1827.

He is buried in Dean Cemetery, Edinburgh. He has a large but simple monument against the southern wall.

== Principal works ==
- The western (original) sections of the Scottish Law Courts (1804–1812) - eventually completed 1830–1840 following the destruction of the buildings to the east originally resistant to redevelopment in the Great Edinburgh Fire of 1824
- The Bank of Scotland Head Office on the Mound (1802–06) (jointly with Richard Crichton - later altered)
- St George's Church, Charlotte Square (1811–14) (later converted to West Register House)
- Leith Custom House (1811–12)
- Old Academy, Perth (1803–07)
- Edinburgh Lunatic Asylum, Morningside, Edinburgh (1809–10) (demolished)
- Salutation Hotel, Perth (circa 1810)
- HM Prison Perth (1810–12)
- The library and picture gallery in Paxton House, Berwickshire (1812–13)
- North wings of General Register House in Edinburgh (1822-1834)
- Downpatrick Gaol, County Down, Ireland (1824–30)
- Wick Town Hall (1825)
- Repair and restoration of Arbroath Abbey (1835)

== Edinburgh streets designed by Reid ==
- 33-46 Charlotte Square (1807–15)
- Abercromby Place
- Cumberland Street
- Dublin Street
- Dundas Street
- Dundonald Street
- Drummond Place
- Fettes Row
- Gloucester Place
- Great King Street
- Heriot Row
- India Street
- London Street
- Mansfield Place
- Nelson Street
- Northumberland Street
- Royal Crescent
- Scotland Street
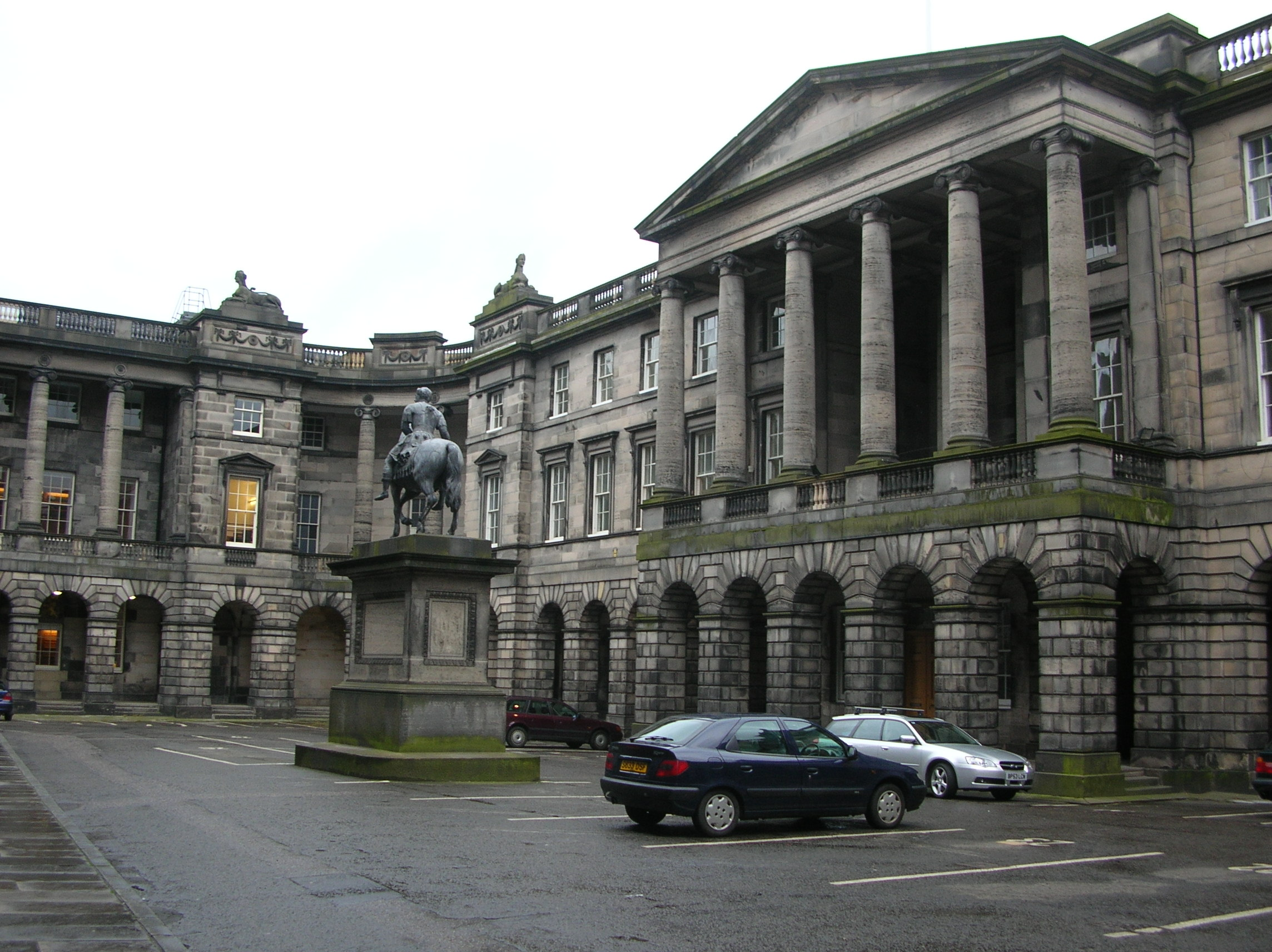
The Robert Reid designed facade of the Law Courts in Edinburgh's Parliament Square

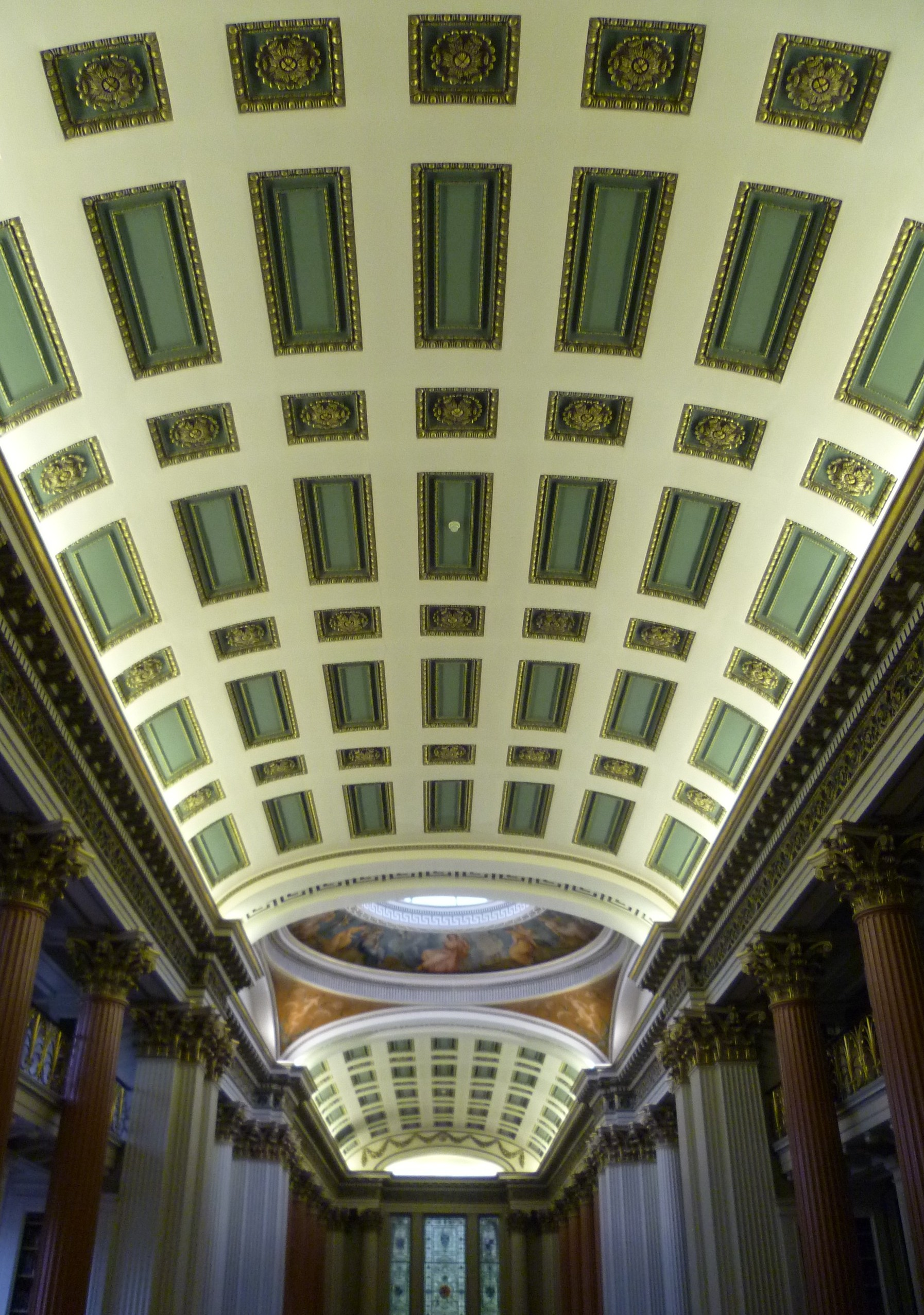
Ceiling of the Signet Library, Edinburgh

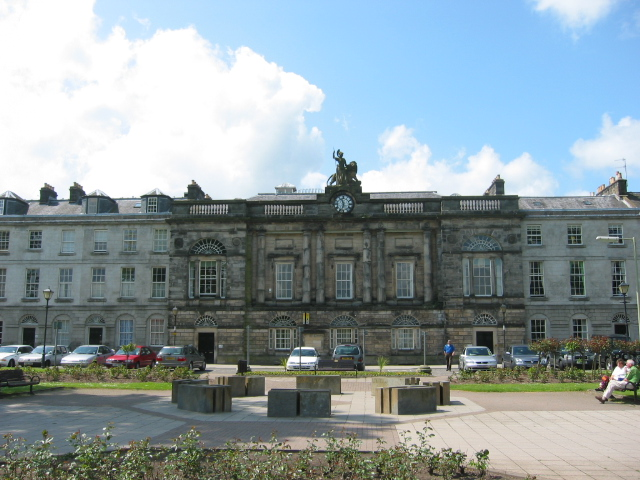
The Old Academy, Perth

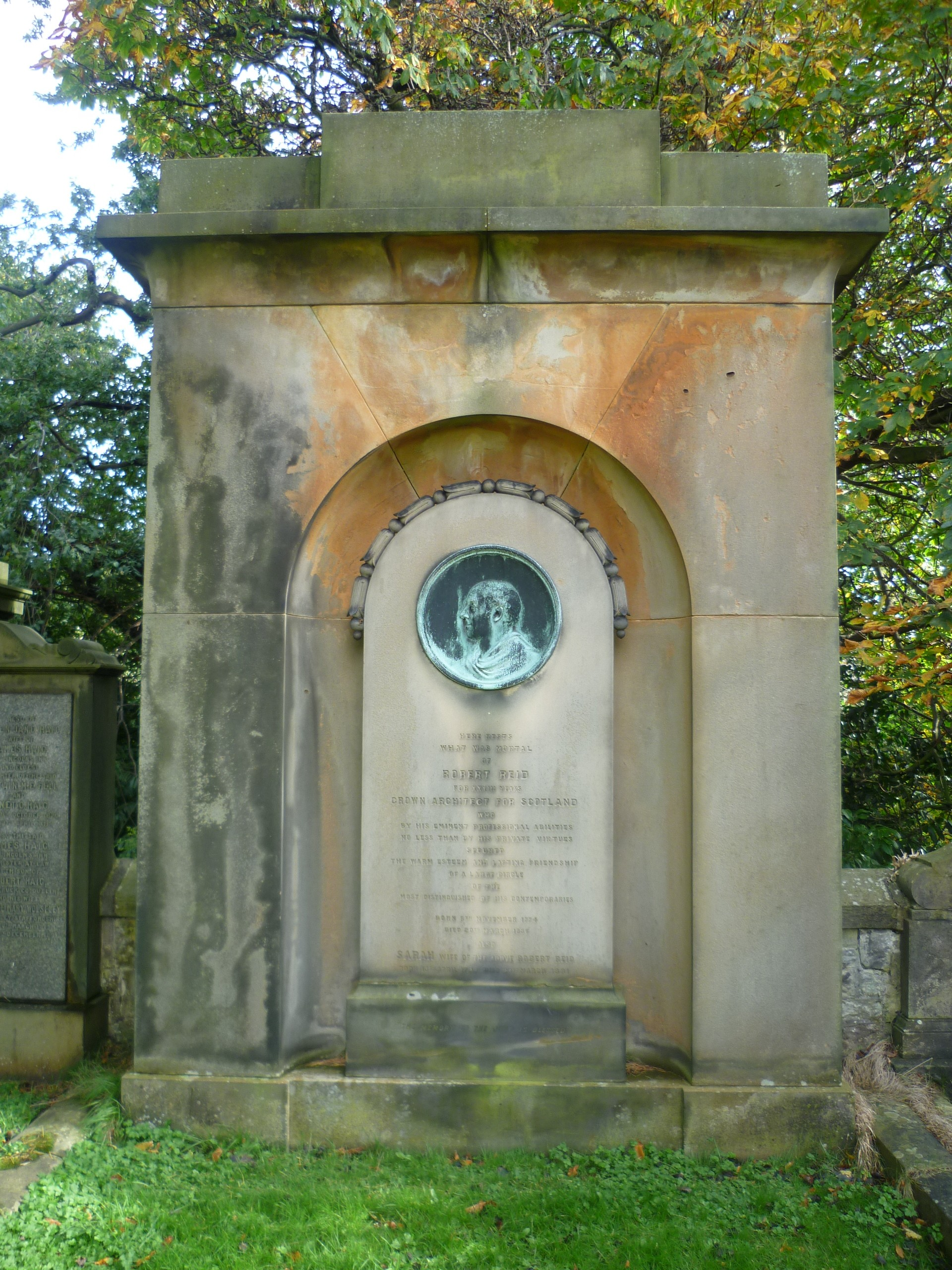
Reid's grave in Edinburgh's Dean Cemetery
