= Patrick Campbell MacDougall =

Scottish minister and professor

Patrick Campbell MacDougall FRSE (28 November 1806–30 December 1867) was Professor of Moral Philosophy at the University of Edinburgh.

== Life ==
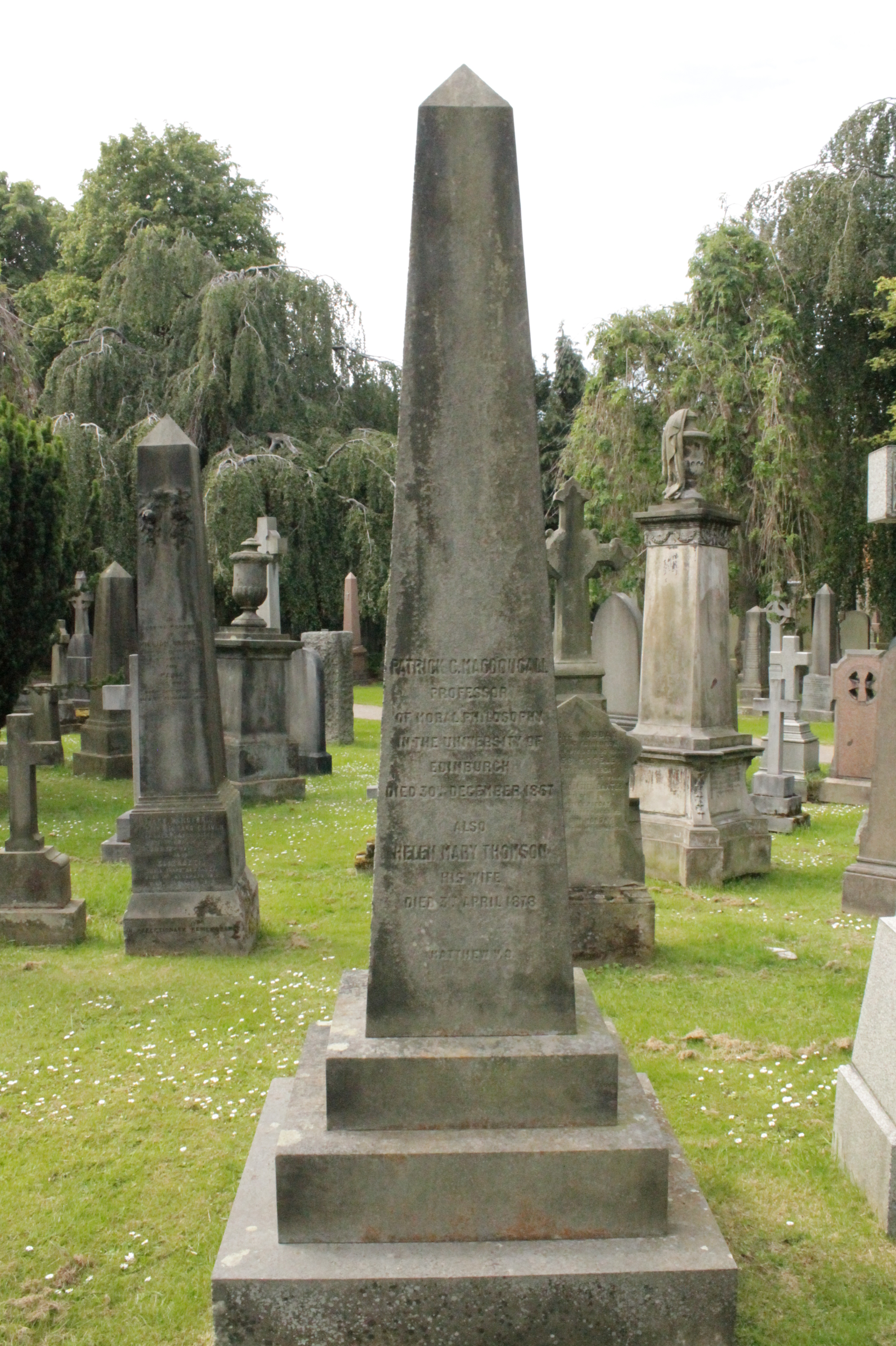
The grave of MacDougall, Dean Cemetery

He was born in the manse at Killin in Perthshire on 28 November 1806 the son of Janet Campbell and Rev Hugh MacDougall. His father died while Patrick was young and he was sent to Edinburgh to live with relatives.

He was sent to Edinburgh High School for education and was school dux in 1822. He then studied humanities, Greek and logic at the University of Edinburgh. He became Classics master at Edinburgh Academy 1833-44. Only in 1835 does he appear as a "student of divinity" living at 17 Cheyne Street in Stockbridge, Edinburgh. In 1840 he appears as P C MacDougall Esq living at 6 West Claremont Street.

In 1844 he was appointed Professor of Moral Philosophy at New College, Edinburgh, training ministers for the Free Church of Scotland. In 1850 he replaced Professor John Wilson as Professor of Moral Philosophy at the University of Edinburgh. He then moved to a large townhouse at 38 Great King Street in Edinburgh's New Town. His appointment was made by the town council. For various reasons he did not actively take the Chair until 1853.

He was the first Convenor of the Free Church's "Widows and Orphans Fund".

In 1860 he was elected a Fellow of the Royal Society of Edinburgh his proposer being James Young Simpson.

He died at his home 9 Buckingham Terrace on 30 December 1867 and is buried in Dean Cemetery. The obelisk marking the grave lies in a group of similar monuments on the main south path, opposite the smaller south sections.

== Family ==
In 1847 he married a widow, Helen Mary Thompson (1808-1878), daughter of Rev William Aird Thomson and the widow of Walter Glass of St Andrews, at St Cuthbert's Church, Edinburgh.

== Publications ==
- Papers on Literary and Philosophical Subjects (1852)
