= Edinburgh: New Town Church =

Edinburgh: The New Town Church of Scotland
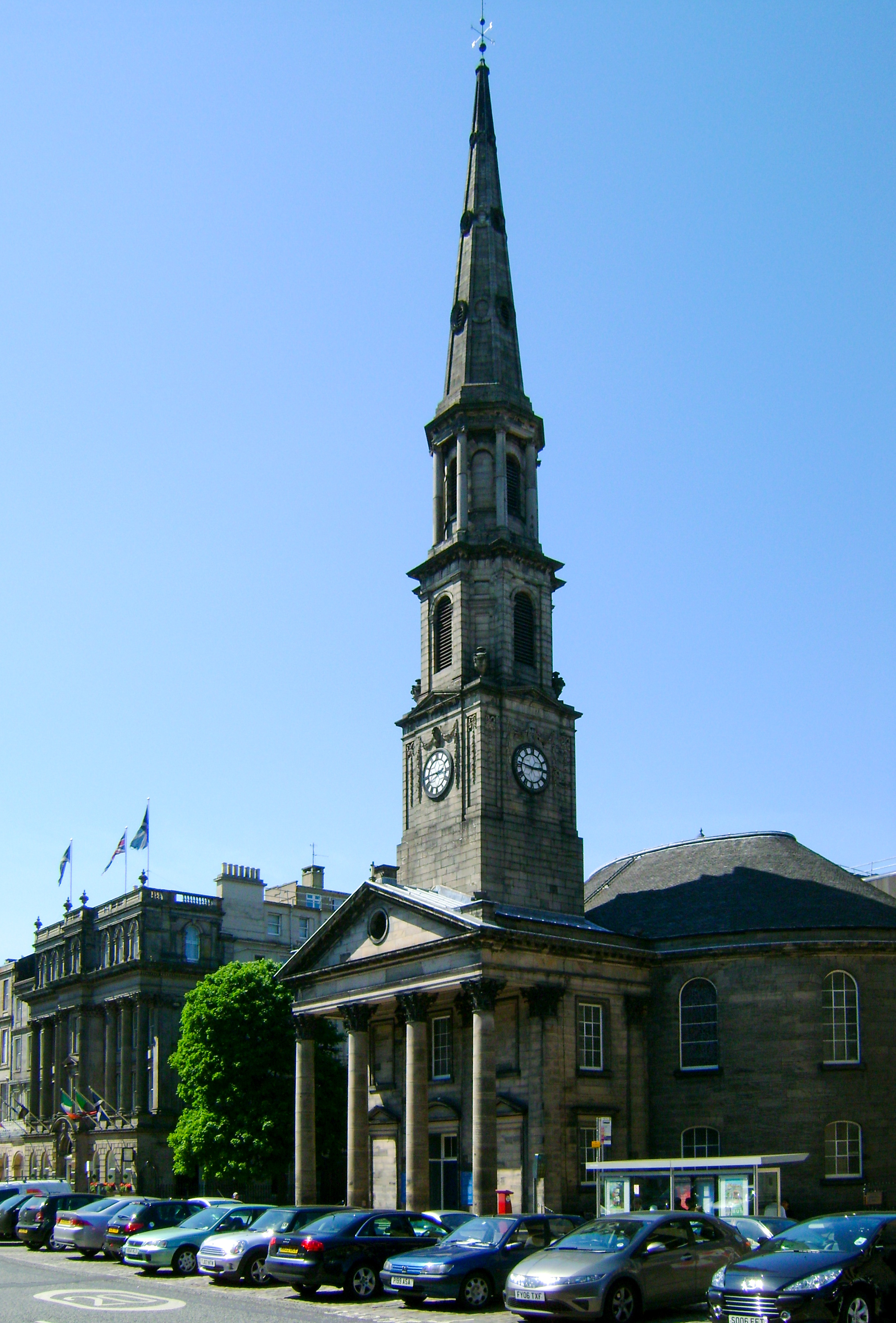
- Edinburgh: The New Town Church of Scotland
- 55°57′14.5″N 03°11′45″W
- Location: 13 George Street, Edinburgh EH2 2PA
- Country: Scotland
- Denomination: Church of Scotland
- Churchmanship: Reformed
- Website: New Town Church

History
- Founded: 1781; 245 years ago
- Dedication: Saint Andrew
- Events: Disruption of 1843

Architecture
- Heritage designation: Category A listed building
- Designated: 13 January 1766; 260 years ago
- Completed: 1784; 242 years ago

Administration
- Parish: Edinburgh New Town

Edinburgh: The New Town Church of Scotland serves Edinburgh's New Town, in Scotland. It is a congregation of the Church of Scotland, formed on 1 February 2024 by the union of St Andrew's & St George's West and Greenside Church.

The parish today constitutes the whole of the First New Town of Edinburgh and a small part of the early-19th-century Second New Town of Edinburgh. The George Street building (formerly St Andrew's Church) was completed in 1784, and is now protected as a category A listed building.

== Buildings ==
Two churches, St Andrew's and St George's, were planned as principal elements in the New Town of Edinburgh. James Craig's plan of 1767 for the First New Town laid out a grid pattern of streets reflecting classical order and rationalism. It was the age of the Scottish Enlightenment, and Edinburgh was becoming internationally renowned as the centre of new philosophy and thought. The two churches were intended to be built on Charlotte Square (originally to be named St George Square), at the west end of George Street, and St Andrew Square at the east end. However, Sir Lawrence Dundas, a wealthy businessman, preferred the eastern site for his home and bought the ground before Craig's plan could be implemented. St Andrew's Church had to be built part-way along George Street, and its place was taken by Dundas House, designed by Sir William Chambers.

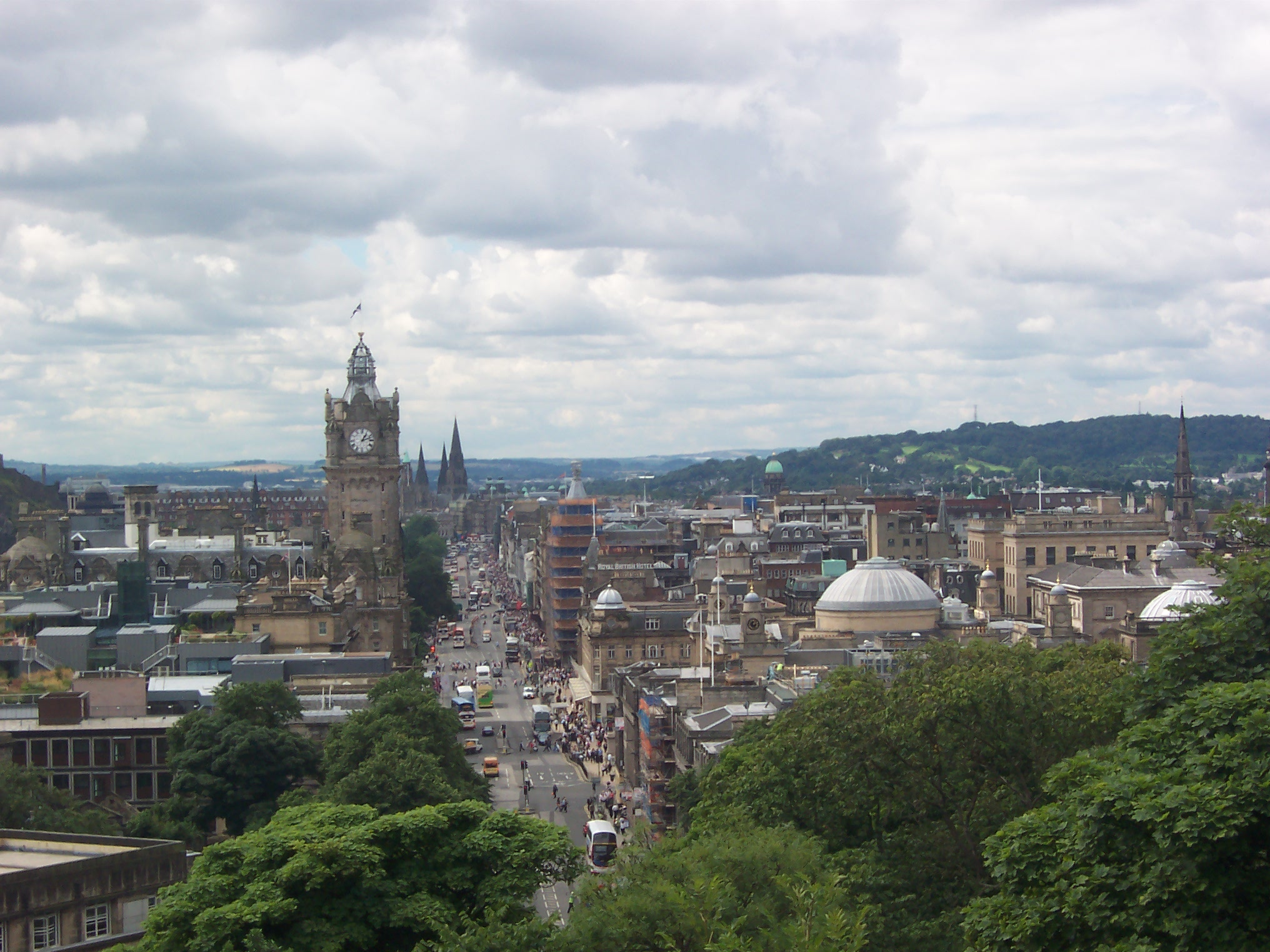
The New Town. The church can be seen on the right hand side of the photo.

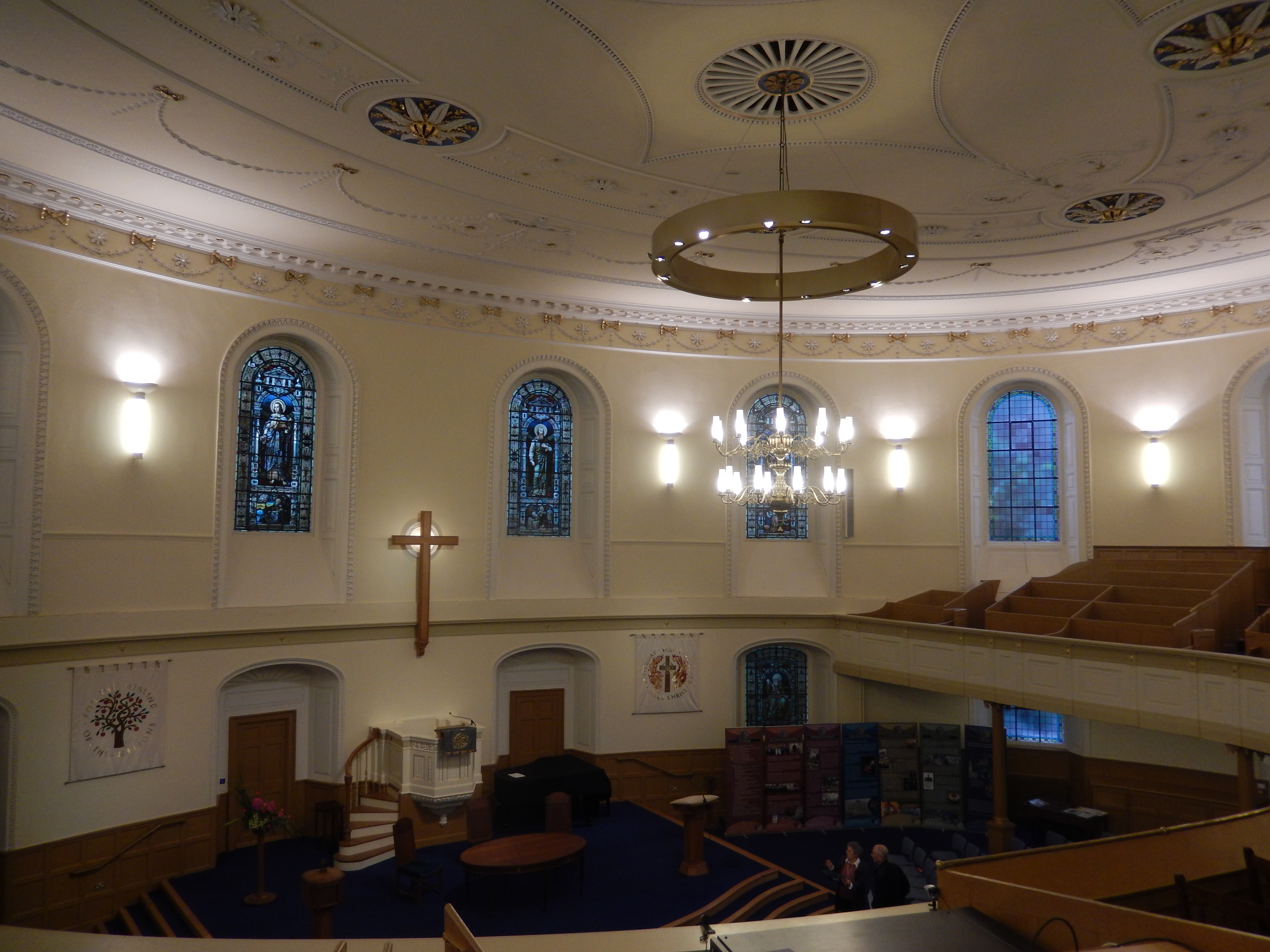
Interior of the church.

=== St Andrew's Church ===
The Town Council held a competition for a design for the eastern church, St Andrew's, which was won by Captain Andrew Frazer of the Royal Engineers and Robert Kay. The church was founded in 1781 and opened in 1784. The church is notable for its elliptical plan which was the first in Britain. The site on the north side of George Street was already developed when the Town Council bought it back to establish the Church, and this shallow space suited the elliptical design. There are similarities to William Adam's design for Hamilton Old Parish Church and to James Gibbs' original idea for St Martin-in-the-Fields in London, both of which were circular sanctuaries fronted with porticoes. The architectural style reflects the contemporary 18th-century fashion for classical Roman forms. These include the temple-front portico with ceiling rosettes based on examples found in Syria by Robert Wood and illustrated in his Ruins of Palmyra of 1753. The magnificent interior-ceiling design, in the style of Robert Adam, also incorporates many features found in Roman and Pompeian interior design, as well as Scottish thistles. The pulpit stands on the north wall, with a panelled gallery with original box pews round the other sides of the ellipse. The pulpit was lowered and the sounding board removed during a 1953 refurbishment, with sections of 19th century box pews removed during 2012 refurbishments.

The original design for St Andrew's Church included a short tower but the Town Council opted for a 51m steeple, built in 1787. It contains a unique peal of eight bells cast in 1788 by William and Thomas Mears at the Whitechapel Bell Foundry, the oldest complete ring in Scotland. The bells were refurbished in 2006 and restored to full change ringing. The original Georgian crown glass sash windows with glazing bars no longer exist. Of the replacements the most noteworthy are stained glass windows depicting The Beatitudes by Alfred Webster (1913) and The Son of Man by Douglas Strachan (1934).

In 1976 the cellar space under the church was adapted for use as the "Undercroft", later linked by a stair to the vestibule.

In 1947 St Andrew's Church was united with Queen Street Church of Scotland, with the Queen Street church building used as church halls. Queen Street Church had been formed by the union in 1891 of Tollbooth Free Church and St Luke's Free Church to form Queen Street Free Church, which became Queen Street United Free Church in 1900 (at the union of the Free Church and the United Presbyterians) and then Queen Street Church after the 1929 union of the United Free Church and Church of Scotland.

=== St George's Church ===
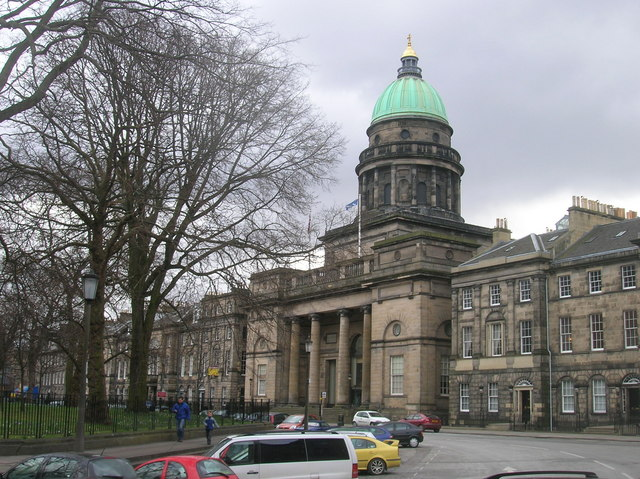
The former St George's Church, Charlotte Square (now the West Register House

St George's Church, on the west side of Charlotte Square, was begun in 1811, with Robert Reid adapting Adam's design from 1791. The original estimate of £18,000 rose to over £23,600 by the time the church was opened in 1814. Severe structural defects, caused by the use of wood and stone underneath the dome, led to its closure in the 1960s when it was taken over by the Ministry of Public Building and Works and converted for use as archives (now part of the National Records of Scotland).

=== St George's West Church ===
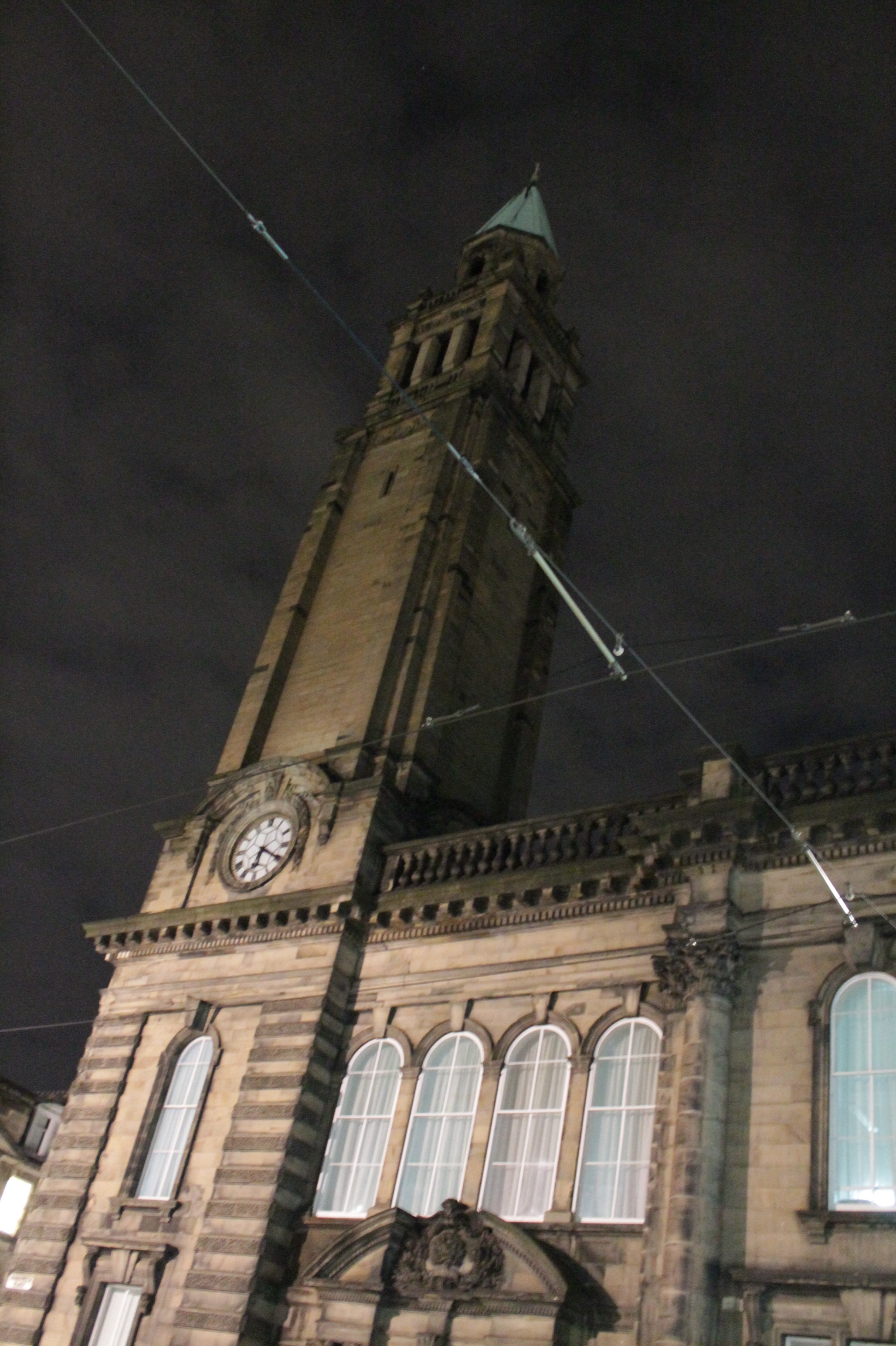
St George's Free Church, Shandwick Place, at night

Free St George's Church was built in 1866–69 to designs by David Bryce in Roman Baroque style. The tower in the south-west corner is partly by Bryce, but was completed by Robert Rowand Anderson, who had briefly been in partnership with Bryce, in 1879–81 with a 56m Venetian campanile, modeled on that of San Giorgio Maggiore.

In 1900 the church was one of the several which partly amalgamated with the United Presbyterian Church of Scotland to create the United Free Church of Scotland. It continued to be called St George's Free Church. In 1929 the United Free Church merged with the Church of Scotland with relatively few staying in the continuing church. The church was thereafter simply called St George's West and was operated by the Church of Scotland.

The Shandwick Place building was sold by the Church of Scotland to Charlotte Chapel.

=== Greenside Parish Church ===
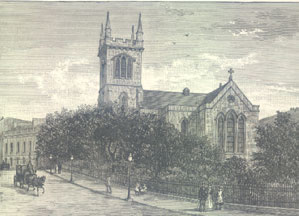
Greenside Church

Originally part of the parish of St Cuthbert's (which covered Edinburgh's outlying areas) Greenside was formally made a parish in 1836.

The church lies on the northern approach to Calton Hill between Blenheim Place and Royal Terrace. It was designed by James Gillespie Graham in 1830 and took nine years to complete, opening on 6 October 1839.

== History ==
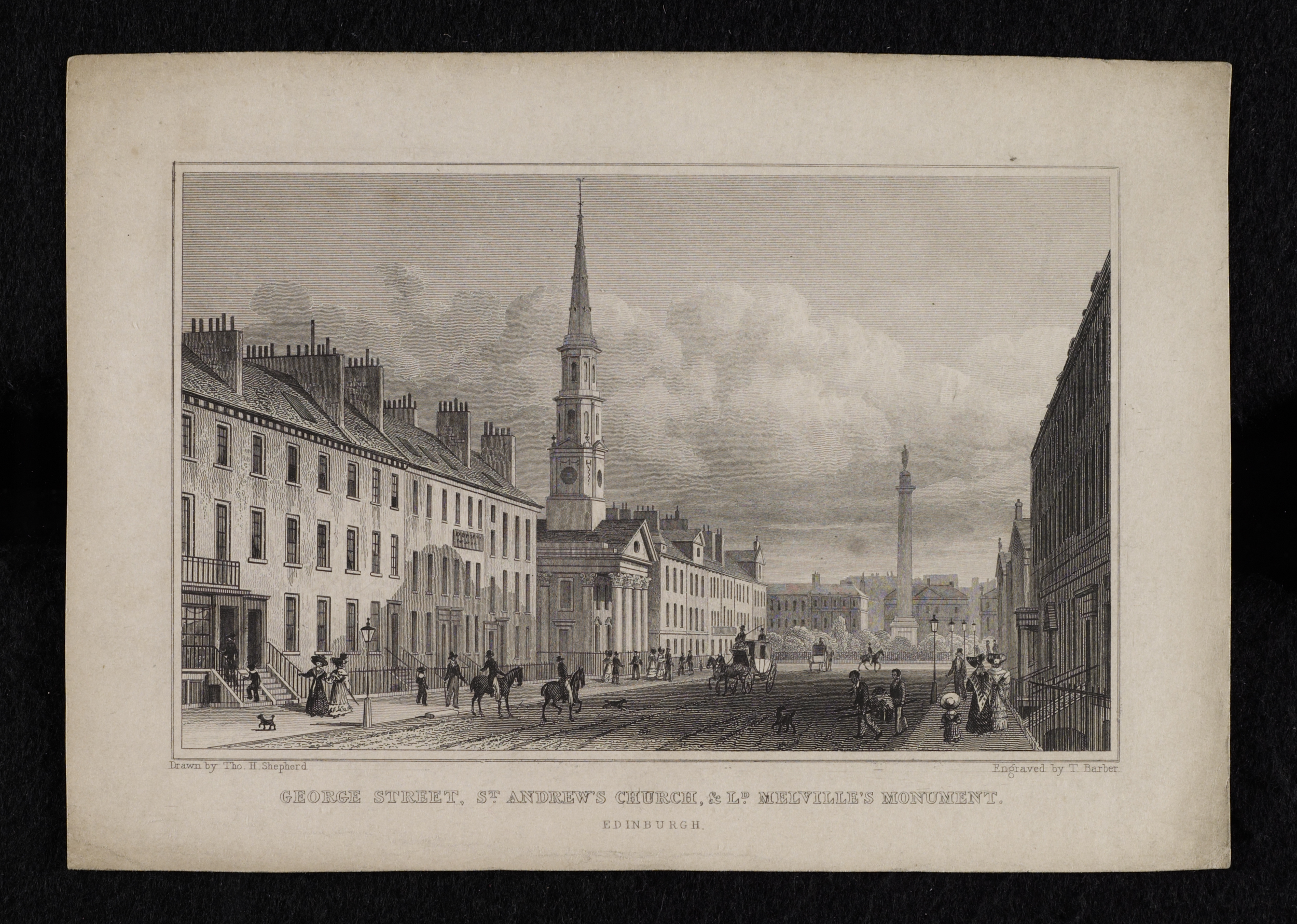
Historic view of the Church, c.1829)

St Andrew's Church was the setting for the Disruption of 1843, one of the most significant events in 19th-century Scotland. Fuelled by increasing concern and resentment about the Civil Courts' infringements on the liberties of the Church of Scotland, around one third of the ministers present at the annual church's General Assembly walked out, cheered by onlookers outside, and constituted the Free Church of Scotland.

In 1964, the congregation of St George's Church in Charlotte Square was united with St Andrew's, forming St Andrew's and St George's. The St George's Church building is now used by the National Records of Scotland. Today, the church hosts an annual book sale for Christian Aid. First held in 1974, in 2006 this event raised over £113,000, including the proceeds of the sale of the script of the Doctor Who episode "New Earth", signed by David Tennant and Billie Piper.

In January 2010, the congregation of St Andrew's and St George's was united with St George's West, Shandwick Place, to form the congregation of St Andrew's and St George's West. Both buildings were in use for three years, with the former St Andrew's and St George's building as the principal place of worship until renovation work started in 2012.

On 17 February 2013, St George's West church held its final Church of Scotland service; a special piece of choral music (which was dedicated to the choir of St Andrew's and St George's West Parish church) was written by Stuart Mitchell for the occasion. The congregation moved back to the church on George Street, and the Shandwick Place building was handed over to Charlotte Chapel, an independent Baptist church on the nearby Rose Street which had outgrown its building and purchased the church for £1.55 million. Charlotte Chapel don't expect to move in until 2016 while £750,000 worth of renovation work occurs, most prominently the re-siting of the centrally located organ console to make way for a baptismal tank. This will be the console's third position since its installation in 1897, and the church's third denomination (originally opened as a Free Church in 1869). The final hymn played on the Hollins organ was 'Lord, for the years your love has kept and guided'.

== Ministry ==
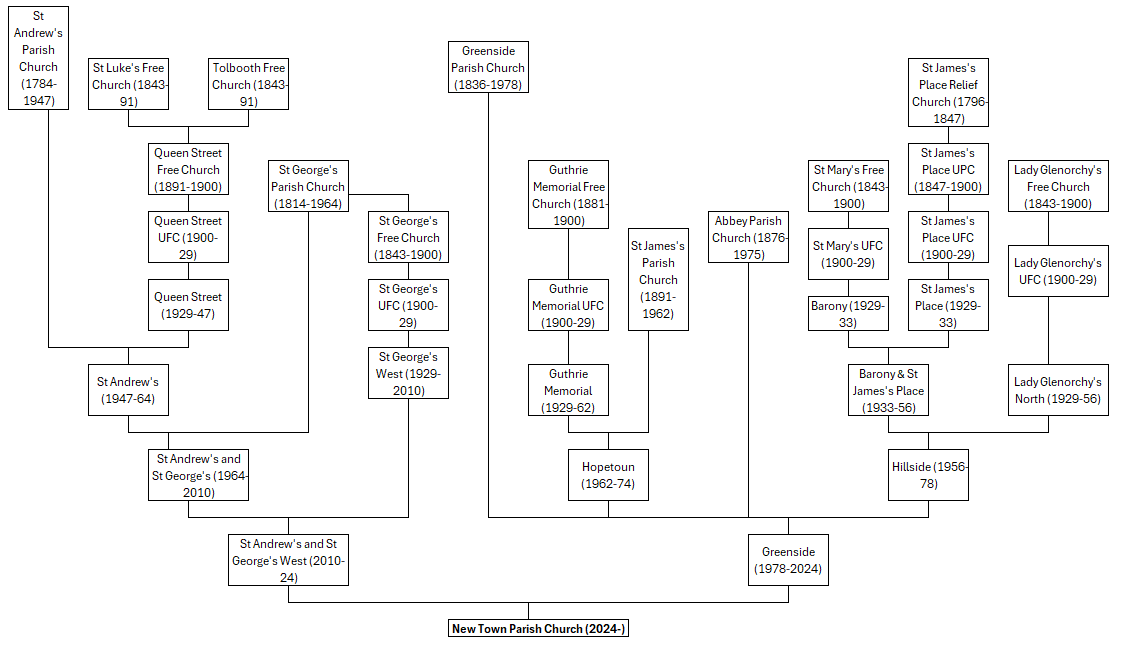
History of church mergers that led to New Town Church

=== Ministers of St Andrew's Parish Church (1784-1964) ===
- 1784-1787 William Greenfield
- 1787-1812 William Moodie (Moderator of General Assembly 1799)
- 1813-1836 Andrew Grant (Moderator of General Assembly 1808)
- 1837-1843 John Bruce (joined the Free Church at the Disruption)
- 1843-1857 Thomas Clark
- 1857-1888 John Stuart
- 1889-1895 Arthur Gordon
- 1896-1909 Peter H. Hunter
- 1908-1937 George Christie
- 1937-1941 William E. Blackburn
- 1941-1947 James S. Thomson
- 1948-1962 Donald Davidson
- 1962-1964 William C. Bigwood (also minister of St George's)

==== Second Charge (1801-1860) ====
- 1801-1844 David Ritchie (Moderator of General Assembly 1814)
- 1844-1860 Thomas J. Crawford

=== Ministers of St Luke's Free Church (1843-1891) ===
- 1843-1891 Alexander M. Stuart (formerly minister of St Luke's Parish Church, moderator of the General Assembly of the Free Church 1875, continued as minister of Queen Street)
- 1876-1891 John G. Cunningham (continued as minister of Queen Street)

=== Ministers of Tolbooth Free Church (1843-1891) ===
- 1843-1863 William K. Tweedie (formerly minister of Tolbooth Parish Church)
- 1863-1891 Alexander Mackenzie (continued as minister of Queen Street)

=== Ministers of Queen Street Free Church / UFC / Parish Church (1891-1947) ===
- 1891-1898 Alexander M. Stuart (continuing)
- 1891-1892 John G. Cunningham (continuing)
- 1891-1894 Alexander Mackenzie (continuing)
- 1892-1923 James Durran
- 1922-1933 John Begg
- 1934-1947 Alexander T. R. Yuille

=== Ministers of St George's Parish Church (1814-1964) ===
- 1814-1831 Andrew M. Thomson
- 1831-1834 James Martin
- 1834-1843 Robert S. Candlish (became minister of Free St George's)
- 1843-1879 Robert H. Stevenson (moderator of General Assembly 1871)
- 1880-1909 Archibald Scott (moderator of General Assembly 1896)
- 1909-1917 Gavin L. Pagan
- 1918-1950 Charles W. G. Taylor (moderator of General Assembly 1942-43)
- 1951-1955 James R. Thomson
- 1956-1964 William C. Bigwood (also minister of St Andrew's from 1962)

=== Ministers of St Andrew's & St George's (1964-2010) ===
- 1964-1971 William C. Bigwood (continuing)
- 1972-1985 William A. Wylie
- 1986- Andrew R.C. McLellan (Moderator of the General Assembly of the Church of Scotland 2000-01, served as H. M. Chief Inspector of Prisons for Scotland until his retirement in 2009)
- 2003 Roderick D.M. Campbell

==== Assistant Ministers ====
- 1978-1983 Mary I. Levison
- 1983-1990 Richard F. Baxter
- 1990-1996 Kenneth J. Pattison (associate minister)

=== Ministers of Free St George's (later United Free)/St George's West (1843-2010) ===
- 1843-1873 Robert S. Candlish (formerly minister of St George's Parish Church, moderator of the General Assembly of the Free Church 1867)
- 1861-1865 James O. Dykes
- 1870-1921 Alexander Whyte (moderator of the General Assembly of the Free Church 1898)
- 1896-1906 Hugh Black
- 1907-1919 John Kelman
- 1921-1948 James M. Black (moderator of General Assembly 1938-39)
- 1949-1963 Murdo E. Macdonald
- 1965-1984 William D. R. Cattanach
- 1985-1997 Robert L. Glover (became minister at Chalmers Memorial Church in Cockenzie and Port Seton)
- 1998- Peter J. McDonald (who went on to become the leader of the Iona Community)

==== Associate Ministers ====
- 1995-1998. Elizabeth M. Curran

=== Ministers of St Andrew's & St George's West (2010-2024) ===
- 2011 Ian Y. Gilmour (to 2018)
- 2019 Dr Rosie Magee (to 2022)

=== Ministers of Greenside (1836-2024) ===
- 1839-1871: William Glover
- 1871-1880: Archibald Scott (became minister at St George's)
- 1880-1884: John Milne
- 1884-1887: John R. Wilson
- 1887-1898: John Patrick
- 1899-1923: John Lamond
- 1924-1928: Peter A. Dunn
- 1929-1949: Dudley S. Hopkirk (subsequently Chair of Systematic Theology, Ormond College)
- 1950-1968: Murdo Macdonald
- 1967-1981: James Watson
- 1981-2011: Andrew F. Anderson
- 2011 - 2024, no fixed minister

=== Ministers of Guthrie Memorial Church (1881-1962) ===
- 1881-1894 John Pirie
- 1894-1921 A. StClair Sutherland
- 1921-1956 Hector C. Macpherson
- 1957-1962: John Maclean (continued as minister of Hopetoun)

=== Ministers of St James's Church (1891-1962) ===
- 1891-1898 Simon S. Stobbs
- 1899-1939 Thomas Porteous
- 1931-1938 Robert P. Constable
- 1938-1944 James Morton
- 1944-1947 Fraser I. Macdonald
- 1948-1961 Angus M. Gray

=== Ministers of Hopetoun Church (1962-1974) ===
- 1962-1973: John Maclean (continuing)

=== Ministers of Abbey Church (1876-1975) ===
- 1876-1909 Robert Milne
- 1889-1918 James R. Sabiston
- 1918-1940 Archibald Morrison
- 1941-1974 John Broadfoot

=== Ministers of St Mary's Free Church, later UFC, later Barony Church (1843-1933) ===
- 1843-1859 Henry Grey (formerly minister of St Mary's Parish Church)
- 1857-1881 Thomas Main
- 1883-1915 George Davidson
- 1915-1922 William King
- 1923-1933 John E. McIntyre (continued as minister of Barony and St James's Place)

=== Ministers of St James's Place Relief / UPC / UFC / Parish Church (1796-1933) ===
- 1797-1819 Thomas Thomson
- 1818-1855 James Kirkwood
- 1845-1856 John L. Aikman
- 1858-1862 Robert S. Drummond
- 1862-1887 Andrew Morton
- 1884-1914: John W. Dunbar
- 1914-1932: Alexander B. Connon

=== Ministers of Barony and St James's Place (1933-1956) ===
- 1933-1946 John E. McIntyre (continuing)
- 1947-1949 James S. Mackenzie
- 1950-1956 John Y. Simpson (continued as minister of Hillside)

=== Ministers of Lady Glenorchy's Free Church, later Lady Glenorchy's North (1843-1956) ===
- 1843-1890 G. Ramsay Davidson (formerly minister of Lady Glenorchy's Chapel)
- 1865-1890 Alexander Cusin
- 1890-1929 James Harvey (minister of the UFC General Assembly 1925-26)
- 1929-1946 Robert R. Fisher
- 1947-1955 John M. Rose

=== Ministers of Hillside Church (1956-78) ===
- 1956-1967 John Y. Simpson (continuing)
- 1968-1977 Alexander H. Paterson

=== Ministers of New Town Church (2024-) ===
- 2025: Dr Conor Fegan

== Edinburgh City Centre Churches Together ==
Edinburgh New Town Church is one of three churches which form Together, an ecumenical grouping in the New Town of Edinburgh. The others are St John's (Episcopal) and St Cuthbert's.

== See also ==
- List of Church of Scotland parishes
- List of listed buildings in Edinburgh
