= Murdo MacDonald =

Murdo MacDonald may refer to:

- Sir Murdoch Macdonald (1866–1957), British politician
- Murdo Stewart MacDonald (1852–1938), last of the Sea-Barons
- Murdo Ewen Macdonald (1914–2004), Scottish minister
- Murdo McDonald (footballer) (1901–1934), Scottish footballer
