= James Black (moderator) =

Scottish minister (1879–1948)

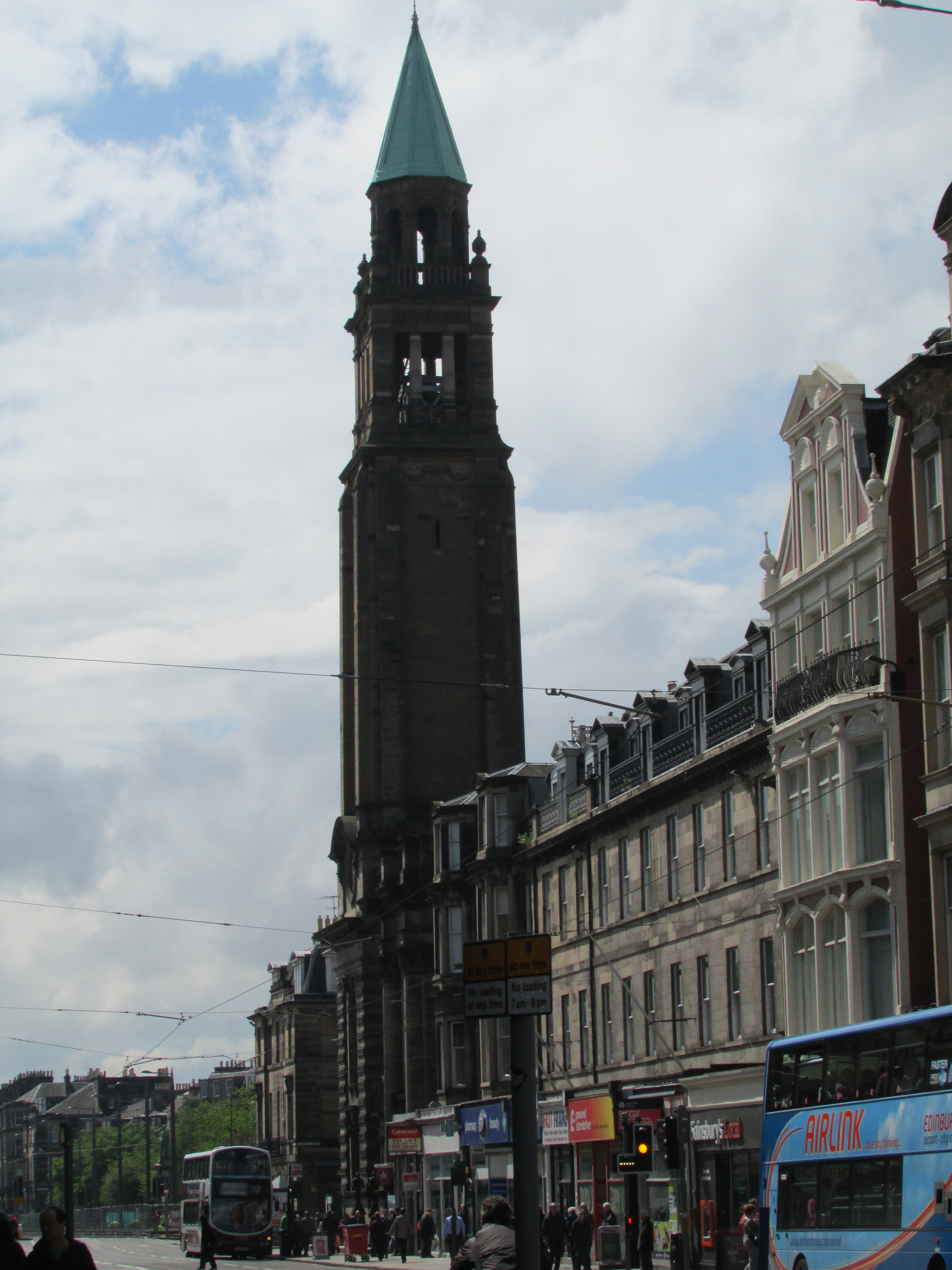
St George's West Church, Shandwick Place, now known as Charlotte Chapel

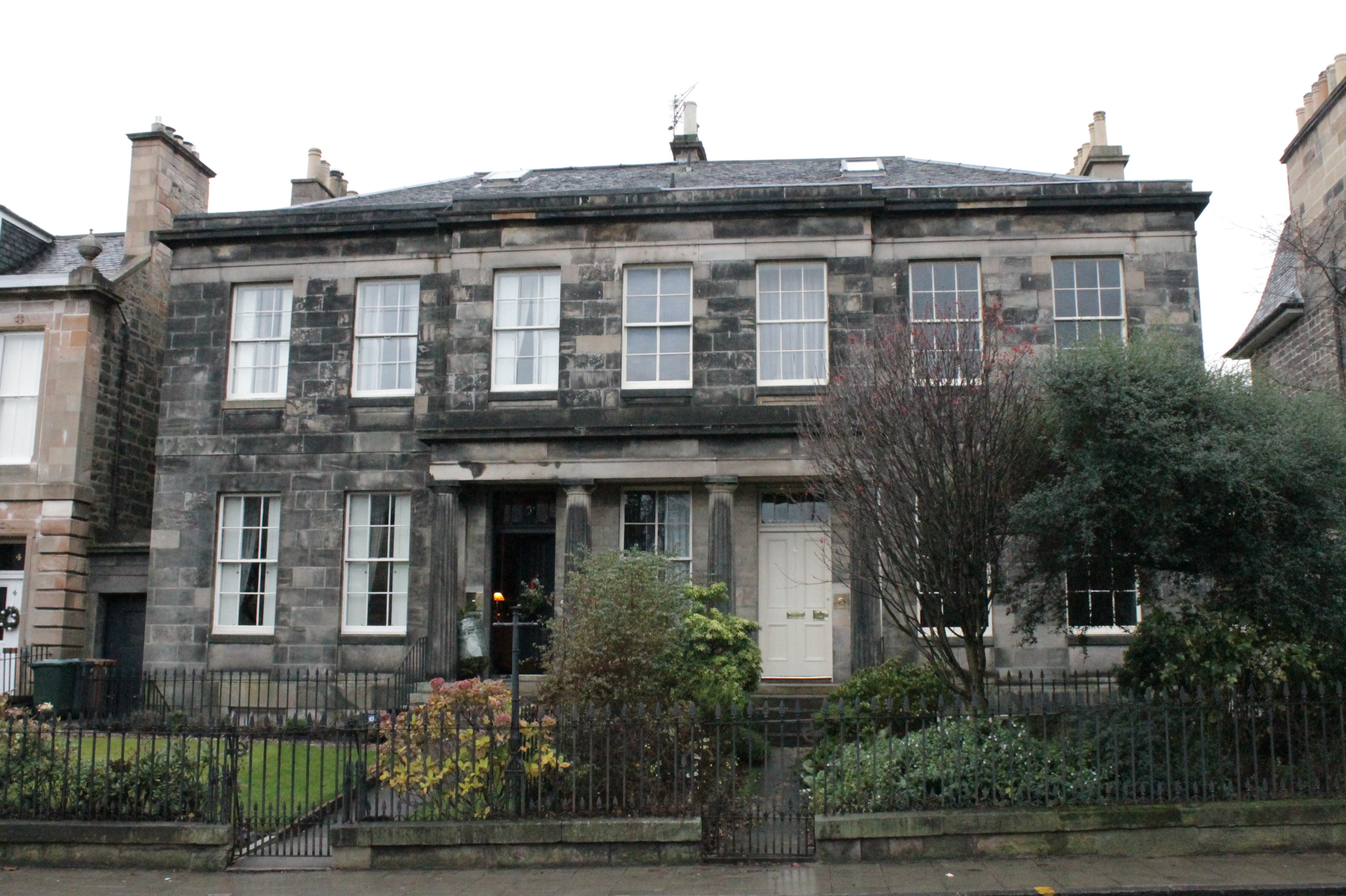
5 Inverleith Row (left)

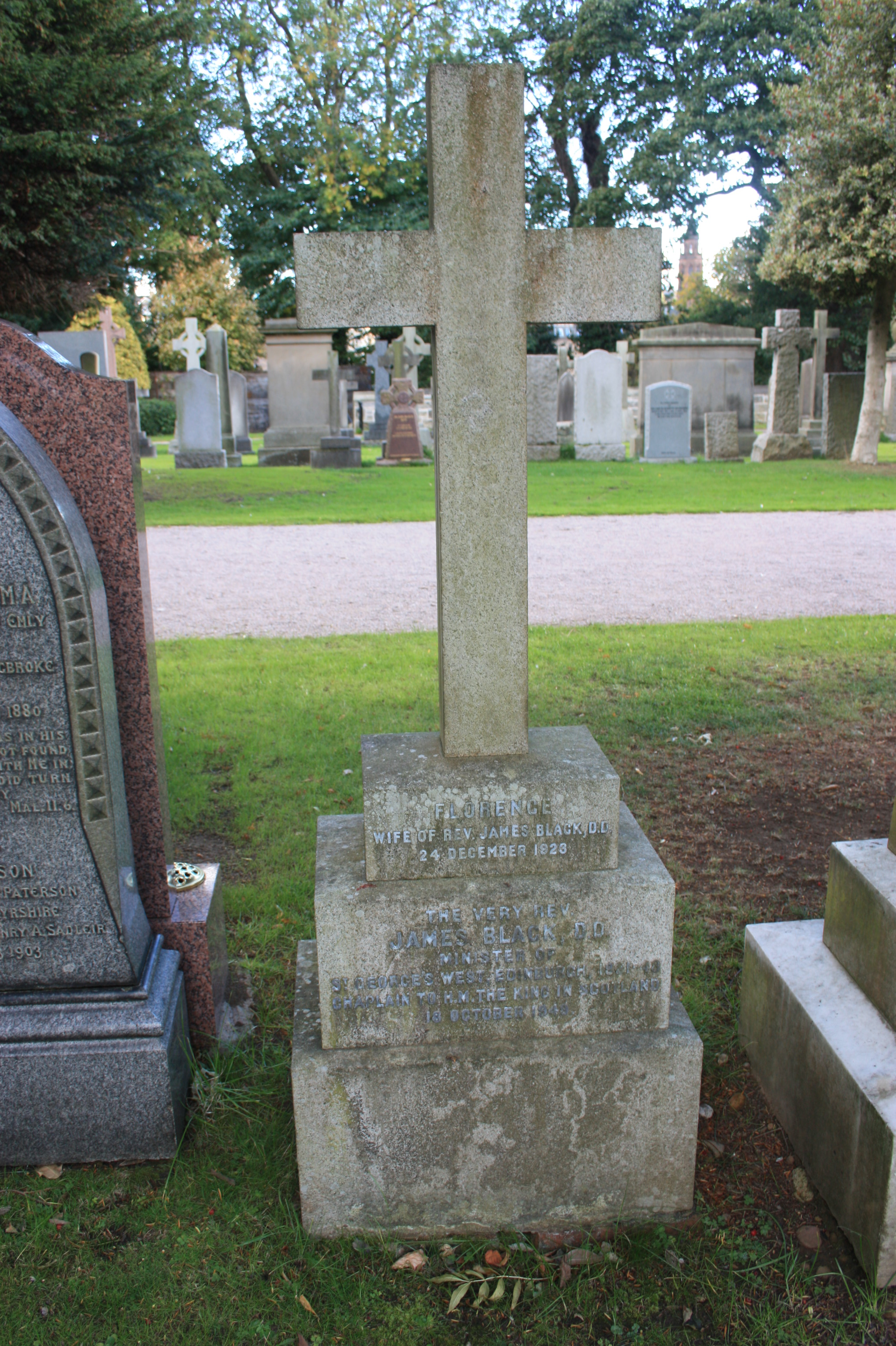
The grave of Very Rev James Black, Dean Cemetery

James Macdougall Black (1879–1948) was a Scottish minister. Originally ordained in the United Free Church of Scotland he became a minister of the Church of Scotland in the merge of 1929 and later served in its highest position, as Moderator of the General Assembly of the Church of Scotland in 1938/39 and was also Chaplain to King George VI in Scotland.

== Life ==
He was born in Rothesay in 1879. He studied divinity at Glasgow University and also studied at Marburg University. He was ordained into the United Free Church of Scotland in 1903 and began preaching at the Castle Hill Church in Forres.

In 1907 he transferred to the United Free Church on Broughton Place in Edinburgh. He then lived at 5 Inverleith Row. During this time he also served as an Army Chaplain in the First World War.

From 1921 he was minister of St George's West Church in Edinburgh replacing Rev Dr John Kelman. In 1929 the United Free Church re-merged with the Church of Scotland.

In 1938 he succeeded Very Rev Dugald MacFarlane as Moderator of the General Assembly and in 1939 was succeeded in turn by Very Rev Archibald Main.

He died in Edinburgh on 18 October 1949. He is buried with his wife in Dean Cemetery. The grave lies on the south side of the main path, near the entrance.

He was succeeded at St George's West by Rev Murdo Ewen Macdonald.

== Family ==
His wife Florence died in 1923.

Michael J. Black, the American computer scientist and Max Planck Director, is his grandson.

== Publications ==
- The Mystery of Preaching
- The Burden of the Weeks
- The Unlocked Door, 1930
- A World Without Christmas, 1931
- His Glorious Shame, 1932
- New Forms of the Old Faith, 1948
- The Dilemma of Jesus
- An apology for Rogues, 1930
- Days of my Autumn, 1950

He also contributed a regular article entitled "Dr Black's Corner" to the magazine "Christian World".
