= Andrew Grant (minister) =

Scottish minister

Andrew Grant (1757–1836) was a senior Scottish minister in the 19th century who became Chaplain in Ordinary to King George III, George IV and William IV in Scotland and Dean of the Chapel Royal. He was Moderator of the General Assembly of the Church of Scotland in 1808.

== Life ==
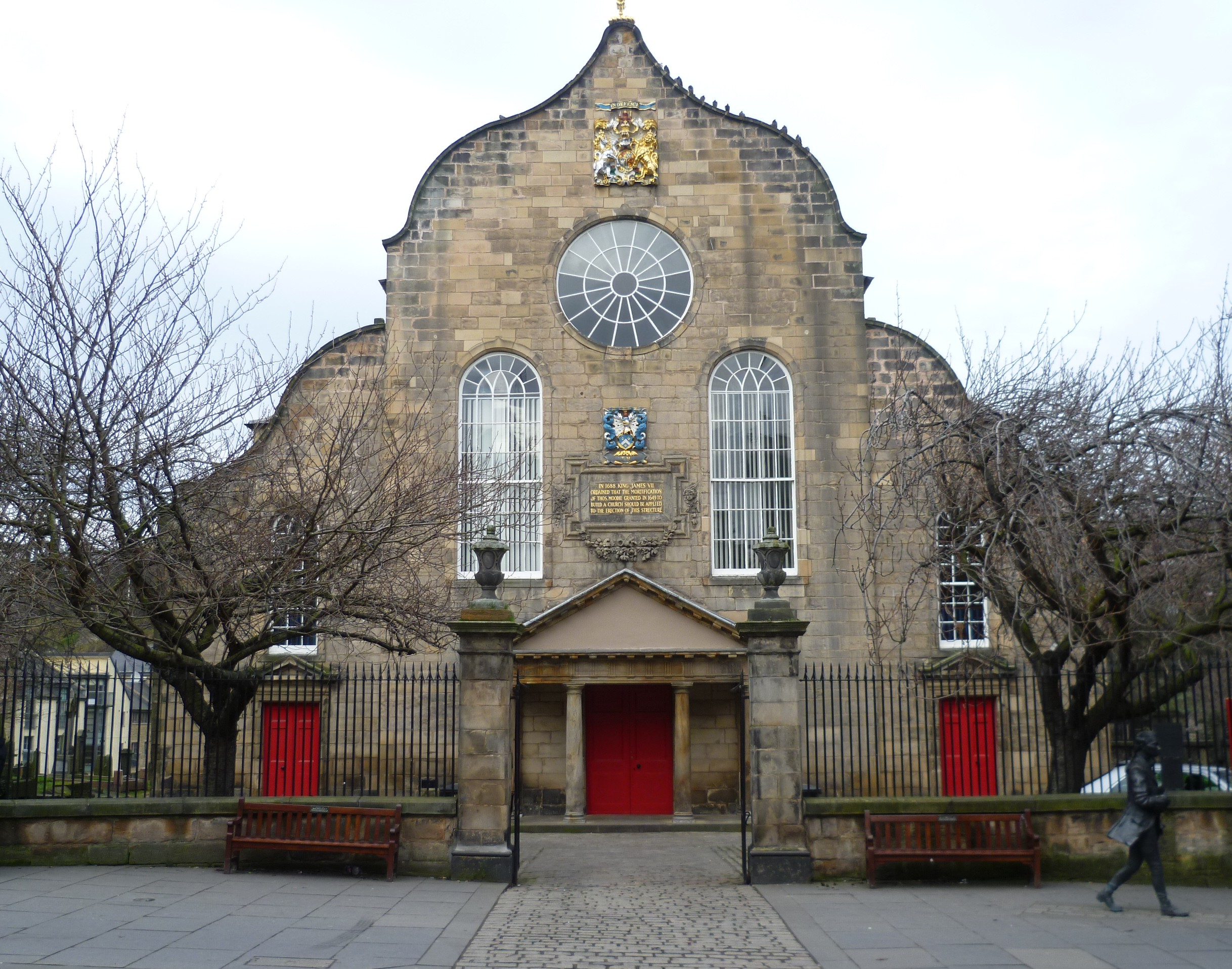
Canongate Kirk

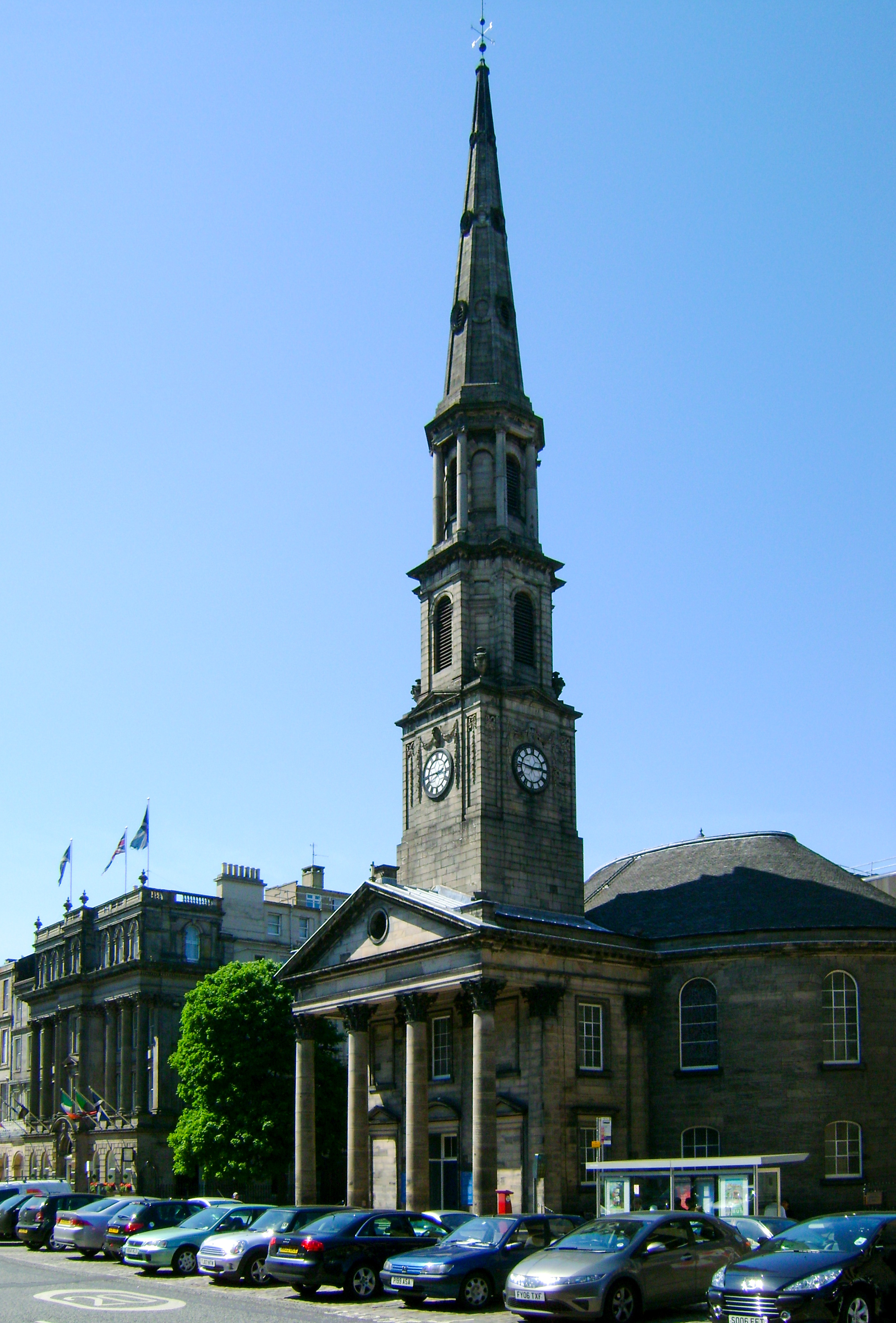
St Andrew's Church in Edinburgh

He was born at Limepotts near Scone, Perthshire the son of Margaret Henderson and her husband, David Grant. He was baptised on 4 June 1757.

He studied at the University of St Andrews and licensed to preach as a Church of Scotland minister by the Presbytery of Perth in July 1781. He then went to Edinburgh to assist the elderly Rev George Wishart in the Tron Kirk. He left Edinburgh in September 1784 when he was ordained as minister of Portmoak on the north shore of Loch Leven.

In 1802 he translated to Kilmarnock Parish Church. He received an honorary Doctor of Divinity from St Andrews University in 1807 and in 1808 was elected Moderator of the General Assembly, the highest position in the Scottish Church. During his year in office he translated to Canongate Kirk in Edinburgh in place of Rev Robert Walker. In October 1810 he translated to Trinity College Church around 200m east of Canongate. In September 1812 the town council invited him to take over St Andrews Church on George Street serving the fast-growing New Town and he moved to this new role in January 1813 replacing Rev David Ritchie. He was then living at 28 James Square, east of the church.

From 1817 to 1821 William Jardine came to lodge with him at his house at James Square, while studying at the University of Edinburgh. Jardine later became a renowned naturalist.

His Royal service is extraordinary, being Chaplain in Ordinary to three successive monarchs: George III, George IV and William IV. He was also made Dean of the Chapel Royal in 1820. From 1827 to 1835 he was joint collector of the funds for the Ministers' Widows' Fund and from 1835 was sole collector. By 1825 he was living at 21 Northumberland Street.

He moved to 68 Great King Street in his final years and died there on 2 July 1836.

== Family ==
In August 1793 he married Agnes Willis daughter of Rev George Willis of Leslie, Fife. Their children included:

- David (1794–1800)
- George Grant (1795–1857) advocate, Sheriff Substitute of Falkirk
- Anne (1797–1881)
- Rev James Grant (1800–1890) who was Moderator in 1854.
- Margaret (1801–1881)
- Andrew Grant (1803–1848) joined HEICS
- Agnes Willis Grant (1807–1838)
- Thomas Grant (1809–1855) actuary
- David Grant (1811–1892)
- Jane (1813–1846) married Thomas Arnot of Chapel

== Artistic recognition ==
His portrait by Robert Moore Hodgetts is held by the Scottish National Portrait Gallery.

== Publications ==
- Account of Portmoak
