= Louisa Hope Stevenson =

Female conservationist

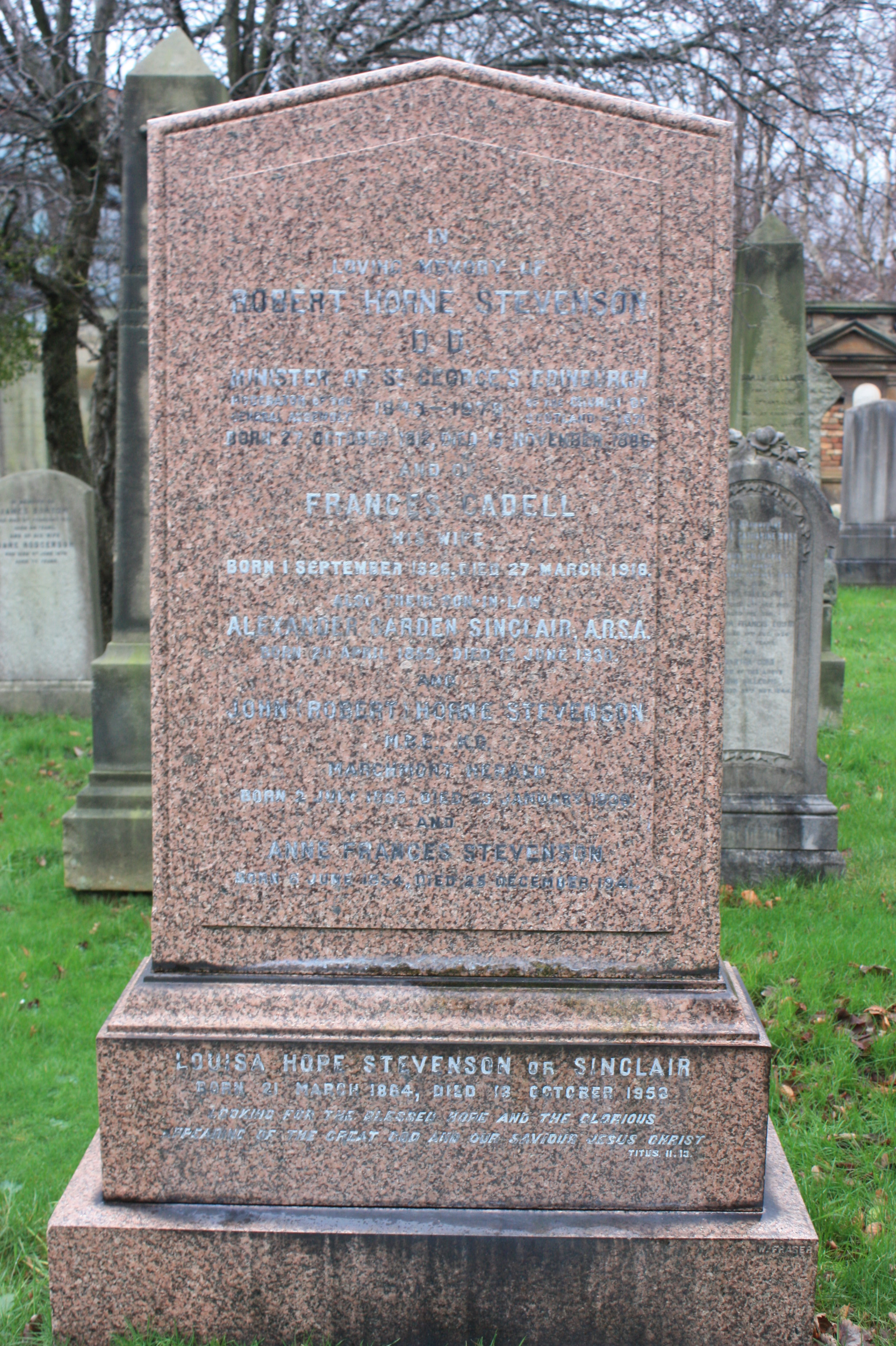
The grave of Louisa Hope Sinclair and her family, Dean Cemetery, Edinburgh

Louisa Hope Sinclair (née Stevenson; 21 March 1864-13 Oct 1950) was an early female conservationist.

== Life ==
Stevenson was born on 21 March 1864, the fifth of six children of the Rev Dr Robert Horne Stevenson and his wife Frances Cadell, daughter and coheiress of Robert Cadell of Ratho. The family lived at 9 Oxford Terrace in the Learmonth district of west Edinburgh, close to Dean Bridge.

In October 1905 she married Alexander Garden Sinclair ARSA, a noted Scottish landscape and portrait artist.

In 1917 she became the first female office-holder of the prominent Edinburgh conservationist group the Cockburn Association, taking on the role of joint Honorary Secretary.

The Sinclairs lived at 18 Ann Street, Edinburgh where Alexander died after a long illness in 1930. The couple had no children. Louisa gifted at least two of Alexander’s paintings to national and local institutions.

In 1942 she donated a portrait called The Satin Dress to Kirkcaldy Art Gallery and she bequeathed an agricultural scene called the Horses Harrowing to the National Galleries of Scotland in her will.

Louisa died on the 13 October 1950 and is buried in her parents' family plot near the centre of the northern 19th-century extension of Dean Cemetery in western Edinburgh alongside her husband.
