= Hugh Black (theologian) =

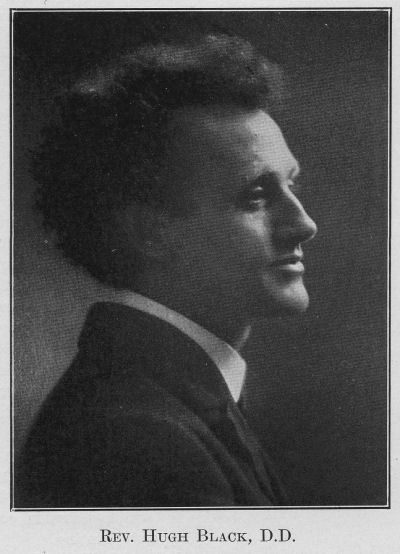

Hugh Black (March 26, 1868 – April 6, 1953) was a Scottish-American theologian and author.

== Life ==
Black was born on March 26, 1868, in Rothesay, Scotland. He received a Master of Arts degree from the University of Glasgow in 1887, and studied divinity at Free Church College Glasgow from 1887 until 1891. Black was ordained in 1891 and became associate pastor at St George's Free Church in Edinburgh in 1896, where he worked with Alexander Whyte.

Black emigrated to the United States in 1906 to accept the position of chair of Practical Theology at Union Theological Seminary in New York City. He received honorary Doctor of Divinity degrees from Yale University in 1908 and from Princeton University and the University of Glasgow in 1911. He later accepted a position of pastor of the First Congregational Church in Montclair, New Jersey.

Black was a guest preacher at Central Congregational Church in Providence, Rhode Island.

Black retired from Union Theological Seminary in 1938.

Black authored numerous books and sermons, including:

- Friendship (1898)
- Culture and Restraint (1900)
- Work (1903)
- Christ's Service of Love (1907)
- Happiness (1911)
- The New World (1915)
- The Adventure of Being Man (1929)
- Christ or Caesar (1938)
