= Andrew Young (poet, born 1807) =

Scottish schoolmaster & poet (1807–1889)

Andrew Young FRSE (1807–1889) was a Scottish schoolmaster and poet, known as the author of the hymn "There Is a Happy Land".

== Life ==
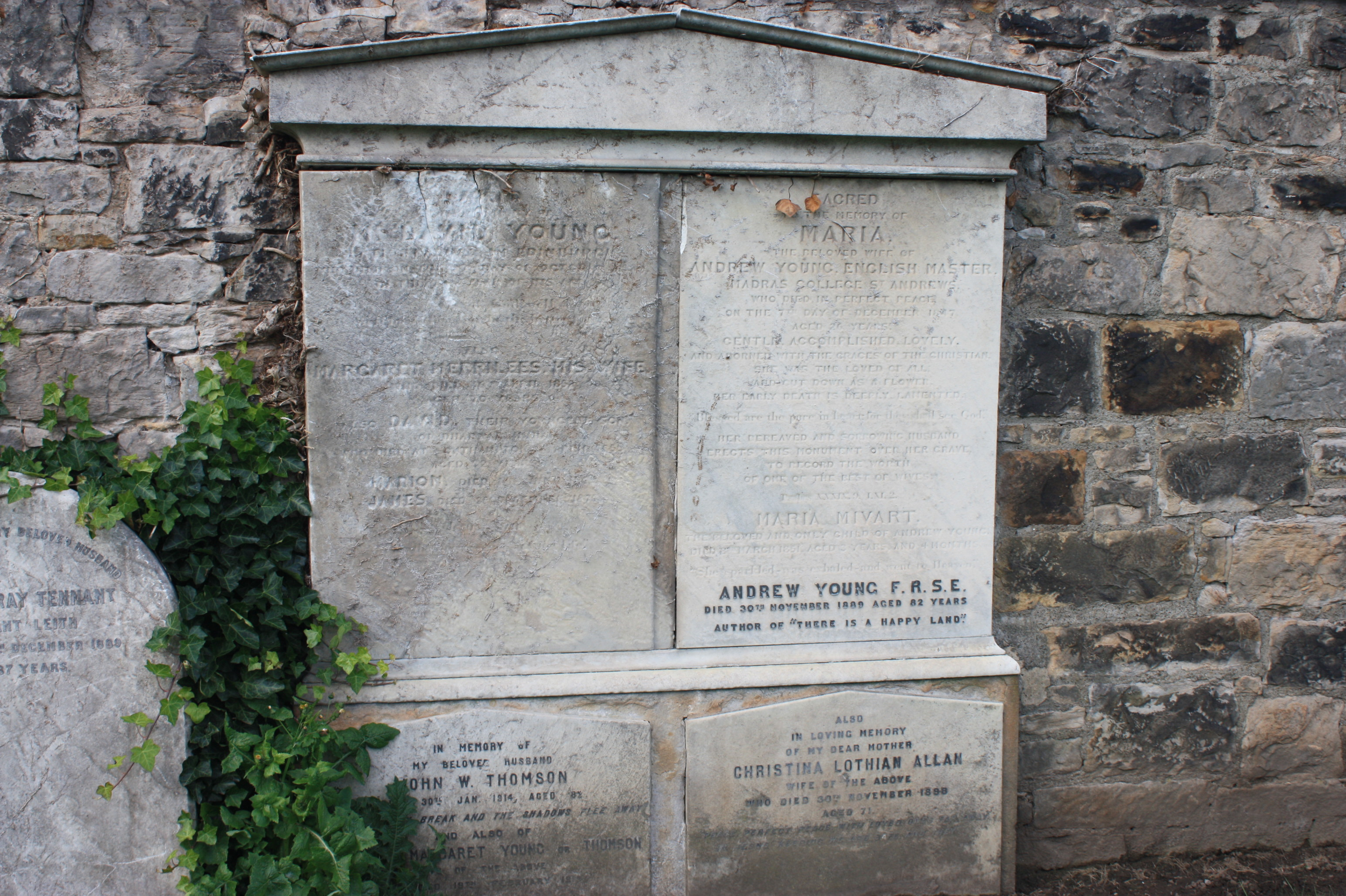
The grave of Andrew Young FRSE, Rosebank Cemetery

The second son of David Young, a teacher in Edinburgh, he was born in Edinburgh on 23 April 1807. He studied the arts and theology at the University of Edinburgh, where he won John Wilson's prize for the best poem on the "Scottish Highlands".

In 1828 Young was appointed by the town council of Edinburgh headmaster of Niddrie Street school, where he taught for 12 years, starting with 90 pupils and leaving with 600. In 1840 he became head English master of Madras College, St Andrews, from which he retired in 1853 moving back to Edinburgh, where he was until his death. In Edinburgh he was superintendent of the Greenside parish Sabbath school, being also actively engaged in other philanthropic work.

He lived at 22 Elm Row at the top of Leith Walk. He attended Greenside Church on nearby Calton Hill. He was made a member of the Kirk Session in 1875 and ran the Sunday School under Rev Archibald Scott.

In 1881 he was elected a Fellow of the Royal Society of Edinburgh. His proposers were Robert Flint, Alexander Buchan, Sir James Donaldson and Alexander Campbell Fraser.

He was found dead in bed on 30 November 1889. He is interred in Rosebank Cemetery, in north Edinburgh.

== Works ==
In 1838 Young wrote a well-known hymn, "There is a happy land", first published in James Gall's "Sacred Songs", and later in hymn-books throughout the world. The words were written to an Indian air which he heard one night played on the piano by a lady. Many of Young's hymns and poems were contributed to periodicals. A collected edition was published in 1876 as The Scottish Highlands and other Poems.

== Family ==
Young was twice married. His first wife, Martha ("Maria") Myvart, whom he married in 1845, died in 1847. He married a second time in 1851 to Christina Lothian Allan (1827-1898), niece of Sir William Allan. He was survived by her and a daughter.
