= St Michael's Roman Catholic Church, Linlithgow =

St Michael's Roman Catholic Church, Linlithgow, Scotland.
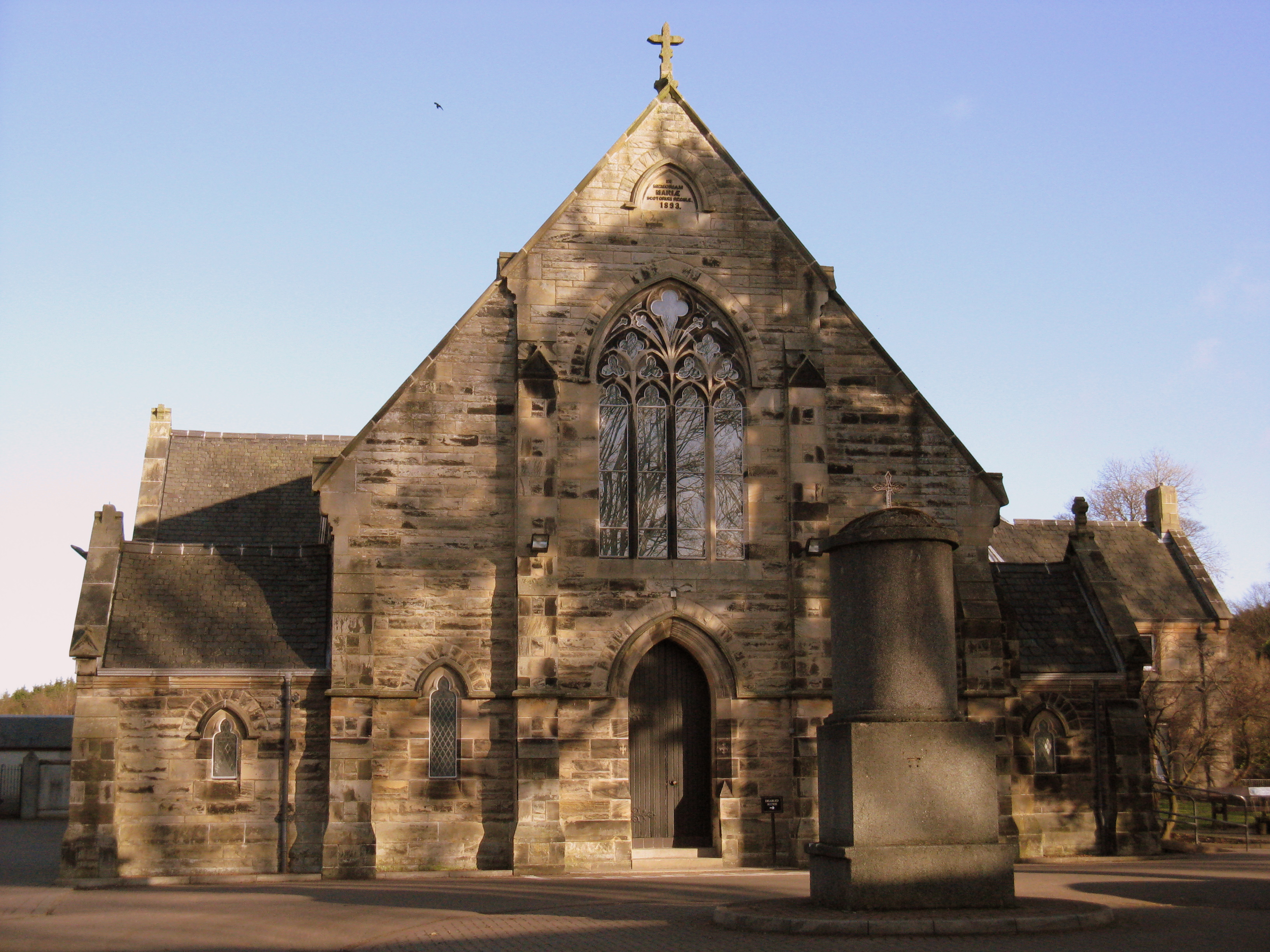

- Location within Scotland
- 55°58′43″N 3°35′41″W
- Location: Linlithgow
- Country: Scotland
- Denomination: Roman Catholic
- Website: www.stmichaels-rc.org.uk

History
- Status: Parish church
- Founded: 1850
- Dedicated: 1893

Architecture
- Architect: Peter Paul Pugin
- Style: Gothic Revival style
- Completed: 1893

Administration
- Archdiocese: Archdiocese of St Andrews and Edinburgh
- Deanery: Linlithgow
- Parish: St. Michael's

Clergy
- Archbishop: The Most Reverend Leo William Cushley PhB STB SLL JCD

St Michael's Roman Catholic Church, Linlithgow is situated in the historic town of Linlithgow. The present church is situated at the East end of the town near the Low Port (entrance to the town). It is located beside the banks of Linlithgow loch and close to the old palace where Mary Queen of Scots was born. Next to the palace is the Parish Church of St Michael's the original seat of the Catholic Church prior to the reformation. This brief history chronicles the Catholic Church in Linlithgow from inception to the present day.

== History ==
=== Introduction ===
St. Michael's Roman Catholic Church is situated in the historic town of Linlithgow. The present church is situated at the East end of the town near the Low Port (entrance to the town). It is located beside the banks of Linlithgow loch and close to the old palace where Mary Queen of Scots was born. Next to the palace is the Parish Church of St Michael's the original seat of the Catholic Church prior to the reformation. This brief history chronicles the Catholic Church in Linlithgow from inception to the present day.

=== Early years ===
The historic town of Linlithgow has a long association with Catholicism in Scotland. Although the present church has been in its current position by the side of Linlithgow Loch for a few years more than a century, St Michael has been associated with Linlithgow since the 13th century. St Michael's Parish church, in the centre of the town next to the remains of Linlithgow Palace, had a long association with the Stuart Kings and Scotland's most famous Queen; Mary Queen of Scots. Mary Queen of Scot's was born in Linlithgow Palace towards the end of 1542 and was baptised in St Michael's Church.

Records of the charter of David II, in which he donated not only the church but also "…its chapels and lands, and all other rights belonging thereto…", indicate that even in 1138 St. Michael's Church of Linlithgow was of considerable size and influence. Indeed, long before 1242 when David de Bernham, Bishop of St. Andrews, officially St Michaels dedicated this beautiful medieval church it was known as a mother church. Located atop the mound and beside Linlithgow Palace the building stands testimony to the power and influence of pre-Reformation Roman Catholicism. The hierarchy of the Church of St. Michael's Linlithgow did without doubt exert great influence on the daily lives of the population of Scotland although much of this influence was secularised through its links with the Establishment.

However, it must not be forgotten that the church was built by local people as a permanent dedication to the greater glory of God. By the 16th century the Church was beset on all sides with calls for reform of various degrees of severity. Moderates, justifiably, wanted internal reform to rid the Church of much that was corrupt. One such was Linlithgow priest Ninian Winzet, who courageously stood up to more militant reformers who wished to see an end to Roman influence. Others were much more militant, for example, John Knox "…whose "rascally multitude" desecrated the church of St. Michael's Linlithgow, among others…". To put it mildly, feelings were running high and the outcome was the radical reformation of worship throughout the land.

Roman Catholic worship at St. Michael's ended in 1561 when Patrick Frenche, who had been instated in 1559, was replaced by the Protestant minister Patrick Kinloquhy. It is thought that Patrick Frenche fled the country along with his fellow believer Ninian Winzet who was "…expelled, banished, and shut out of my kindly toun of Linlithgow and my tender friends…". The post-Reformation era saw Roman Catholicism in disarray and the 1567 act of Parliament criminalising the saying or hearing of Mass means that there is little record of how the faithful met for worship. It is known that there were travelling priests who must have visited the town but little is recorded until much later when the arrival of large numbers of Irish families highlighted the dearth of religious care in Linlithgow.

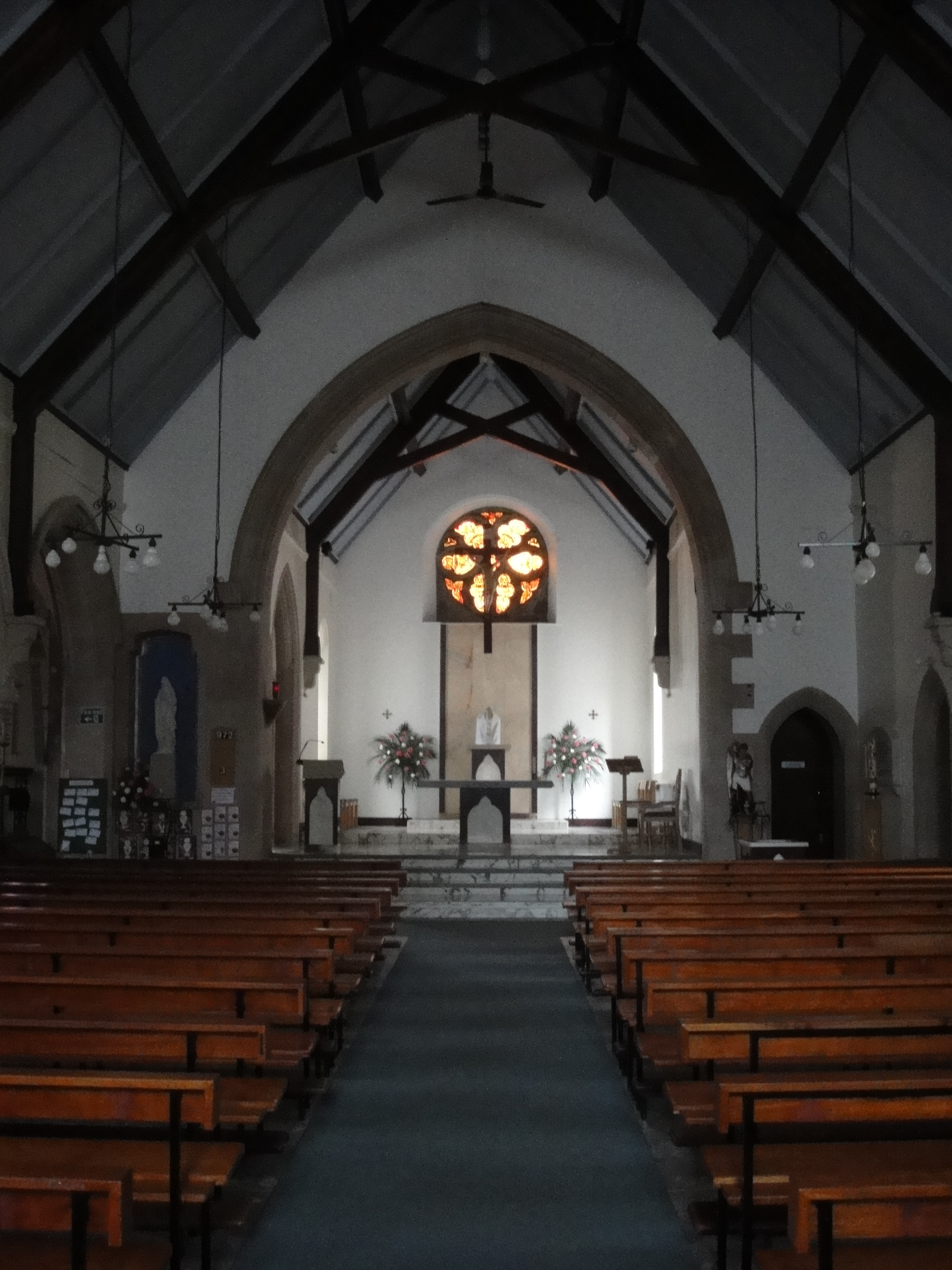
Interior of the church

Details of Catholicism in the area remain scarce until around the middle of the 19th century when, as a consequence of the famine in Ireland, there was a large influx of Irish Catholics to Scotland. Many worked in the farms in and around the Royal Burgh during the spring and summer months. However the development of the Shale Oil industry in West Lothian heralded the development of a permanent Catholic population in the town.

=== The Church on Blackness Road ===
Designed by Peter Paul Pugin, of the distinguished Victorian firm of architects Pugin and Pugin, the present day building is in the Gothic Revival style. Officially dedicated in 1893, such was the fervor of the then Roman Catholic population of Linlithgow for a permanent place of worship that Mass was first celebrated in the partially completed building on St. Valentine's Day 1888. Although the building and the parish community it represents are now only 108 years old St. Michael's Roman Catholic Church Linlithgow has a long and chequered history.

In the late 19th century the many Irish workers attracted to Linlithgow by the promise of jobs in the area's expanding oil shale industry wanted a permanent place to worship. As a result of their petition to the Archdiocese of St. Andrews and Edinburgh the first resident priest for around 300 years was appointed. Father Andrew Smith quickly took up their cause and gained permission for Mass to be celebrated on Sundays in the premises of Spence's Tannery located in one of the riggs off the High Street. Soon more suitable premises were found but the Baird Hall, although welcome, was not what the new parishioners wanted for their regular place of worship.

Acutely aware of the high cost of building a new church and of how little they could spare from their small incomes they were nonetheless actively engaged in saving for their own premises when their prayers were heard and answered. The appointment of Fr John M. Murphy was very fortuitous indeed since he had trained as a stonemason before being called to the priesthood. A good pastor he quickly associated himself with the needs of his parishioners and "…advertised in the 'Glasgow Observer' that he intended holding a grand bazaar, 'to raise funds for the erection of a church dedicated to Queen Mary'."

Less than one year after his arrival and with the willing help of the young men of the parish he set about building the church himself. The foundation stone was laid by the Archbishop in 1887. (Indeed, lodged in the archives is the ceremonial trowel inscribed - "Presented to His Grace Archbishop Smith by the Members of the Catholic Congregation, Linlithgow on the occasion of his laying the foundation stone of the Mary Queen of Scots Memorial Church. 14th June 1887".) The local paper reported that on this occasion the decision was taken to change the name of the parish from St. Joseph's to St. Michael's and to dedicate the church to St. Michael, though still in memory of Mary Queen of Scots, the only church in Scotland so Dedicated.

A few months later the building was officially opened; the unfinished parts were left bricked up until sufficient funds were available. The congregation then set out to build a school next to the church; St. Joseph's school was opened on 1 July 1889, and moved to Preston Road in 1964.

Fr Easson replaced Fr Murphy as parish priest; the church building programme continued. Plans to double the size of the church at a cost of £1,100 were submitted. The Archbishop celebrated a Pontifical High Mass in June 1894.

=== 20th century ===
St Michael's continued to grow in the early part of the 20th century despite the very hard times brought on the families of St Michaelsthe parish. The Great War and the Depression had a marked effect on a number of the families in the Linlithgow area. The demand for Shale Oil dried up during the depression and many families found themselves with little or no earnings.

In 1938 the parish celebrated the 50th anniversary of the laying of the foundation stone of the church. Soon after this the Second World War started and many of the men folk left to join the forces.

In 1946 the church celebrated the consecration of the high altar.

In 1940 Father Michael McGovern became parish priest at St. Michael's. Father McGovern was an untiring priest in his work for the parish and achieved many great things during his 40 years as parish priest. These included the development of the tennis courts and the Queen Margaret Hall. Another memorable development of Father McGovern is the Laetare International Youth Centre which he opened in 1942 (originally a small two bedroomed cottage). During the war the area covered by Laetare served to house Polish Soldiers. During their Stay in Linlithgow they erected a Shrine to the Blessed Virgin. This still stands in the grounds of the church.

The church population continued to grow during the later years of the century with the increasing development of Linlithgow as a commuter town for both Glasgow and Edinburgh and with the development of the new industries in and around West Lothian. During the latter part of the 20th century, the parish was served by the late Canon Hugh Gordon and Father James Ferrari. Father Ferrari was parish priest when the church celebrated its centenary. On his retiral Father Ferrari was succeeded by Father Pat Boylan who was succeeded in turn by Fr. Paul Kelly in June 2009

=== Catholic education ===
In line with the need to provide Catholic Services in Linlithgow and the surrounding areas, there was a requirement to provide the children with Catholic Education. Initially this was the task of the Sisters of Mercy. In the 19th century the parish was dedicated to St Joseph and so the school took St. Joeseph's as its name. This is still the case today. The church was built in 1242.

Classes were originally held in the Baird Hall and Catholic pupils came from other villages close to Linlithgow, many travelling on foot each day. In the 1880s the provision of education was handed over to teachers. Originally there were two teachers for 150 pupils. The first St Joseph’s school building was completed in 1892 and was situated in the grounds of the Church.

The provision of education to the children of Linlithgow was difficult due to the fact that children were often required to work on farms. The health conditions in and around the town often caused further problems for the teachers and on several occasions the school had to be closed temporarily due to infectious diseases.

Prior to the end of World War I, St Joseph's (like other Catholic schools) had not been part of the state school system. This position was changed by the Education (Scotland) Act 1918. Throughout the early 20th century the school continued to flourish.

By 1949 the school roll had grown so much that there was not enough room in the school for all the pupils. Some classes were held in different buildings across the town. At this time the school housed both primary and junior secondary pupils. The more academically gifted pupils attended St Mary’s in Bathgate. In 1955 the Junior Secondary School moved to new premises in Bo'ness. However this did not alleviate all the accommodation problems and the authorities agreed to build a new St Joseph's Primary School. In 1963 the present St. Joseph’s on Preston Road was opened and, with the benefit of some welcome enhancements in the 1990s, it thrives there today.

With the arrival of the regional councils and the introduction of comprehensive education the ties with Bo'ness as provide of the junior secondary education ended in the late 1970s. All secondary pupils went to St. Mary's Bathgate. In the mid 1990s, with the closure of St. Mary's, to make way for the new Secondary School in Livingston, Linlithgow pupils changed to St. Kentigern's Blackburn.

Today, the teachers of both St. Joseph's and St. Kentigern's work in close partnership with our local Priest and the parents of the parish to provide a thriving Catholic Education for the children.

== See also ==
- St Michael's Parish Church, Linlithgow, a burgh church in the Church of Scotland
