= St Michael's Parish Church, Linlithgow =

Church in West Lothian, Scotland

Coordinates: 55.977°N 3.601°W

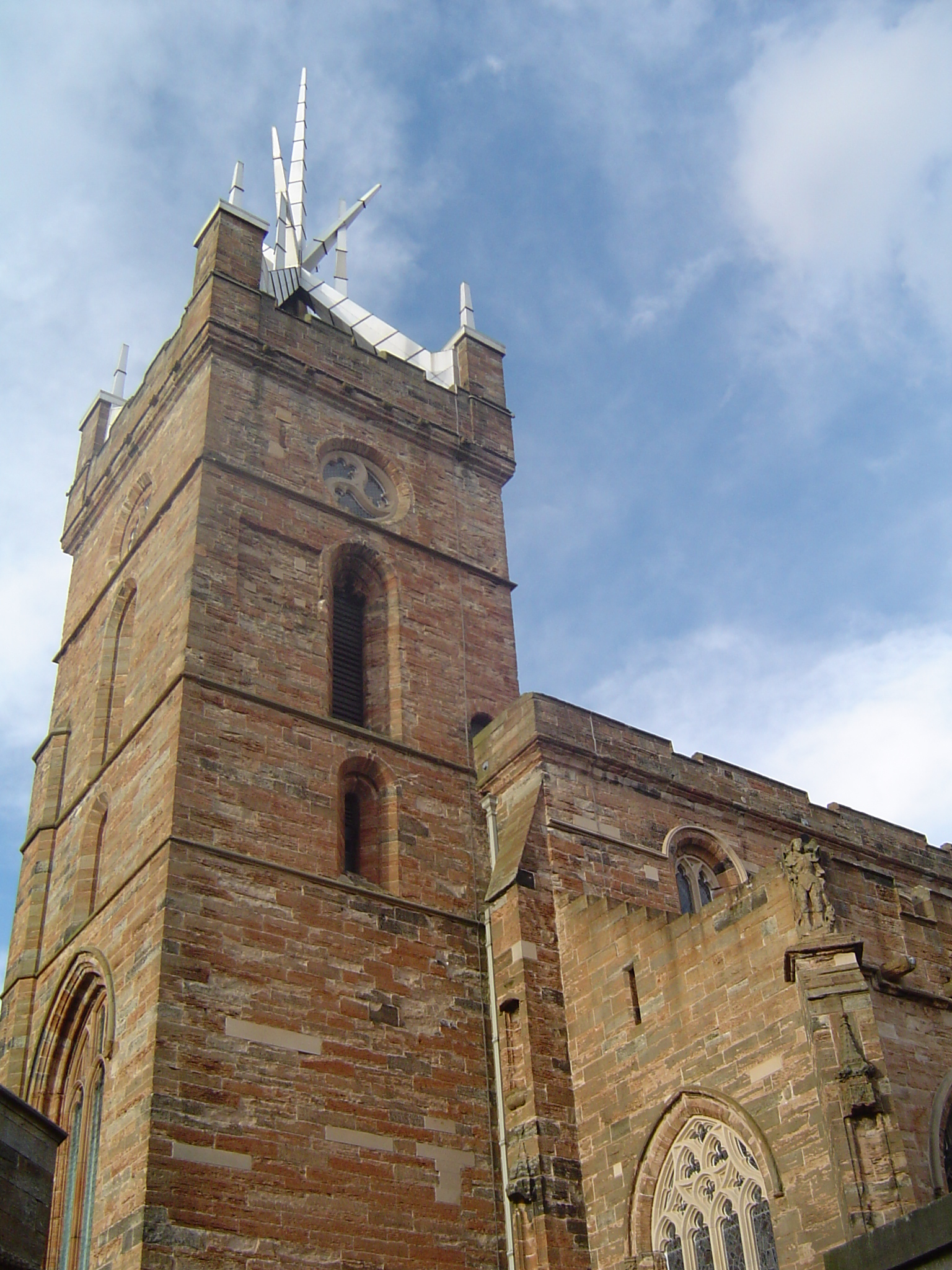
St Michael's Church Spire

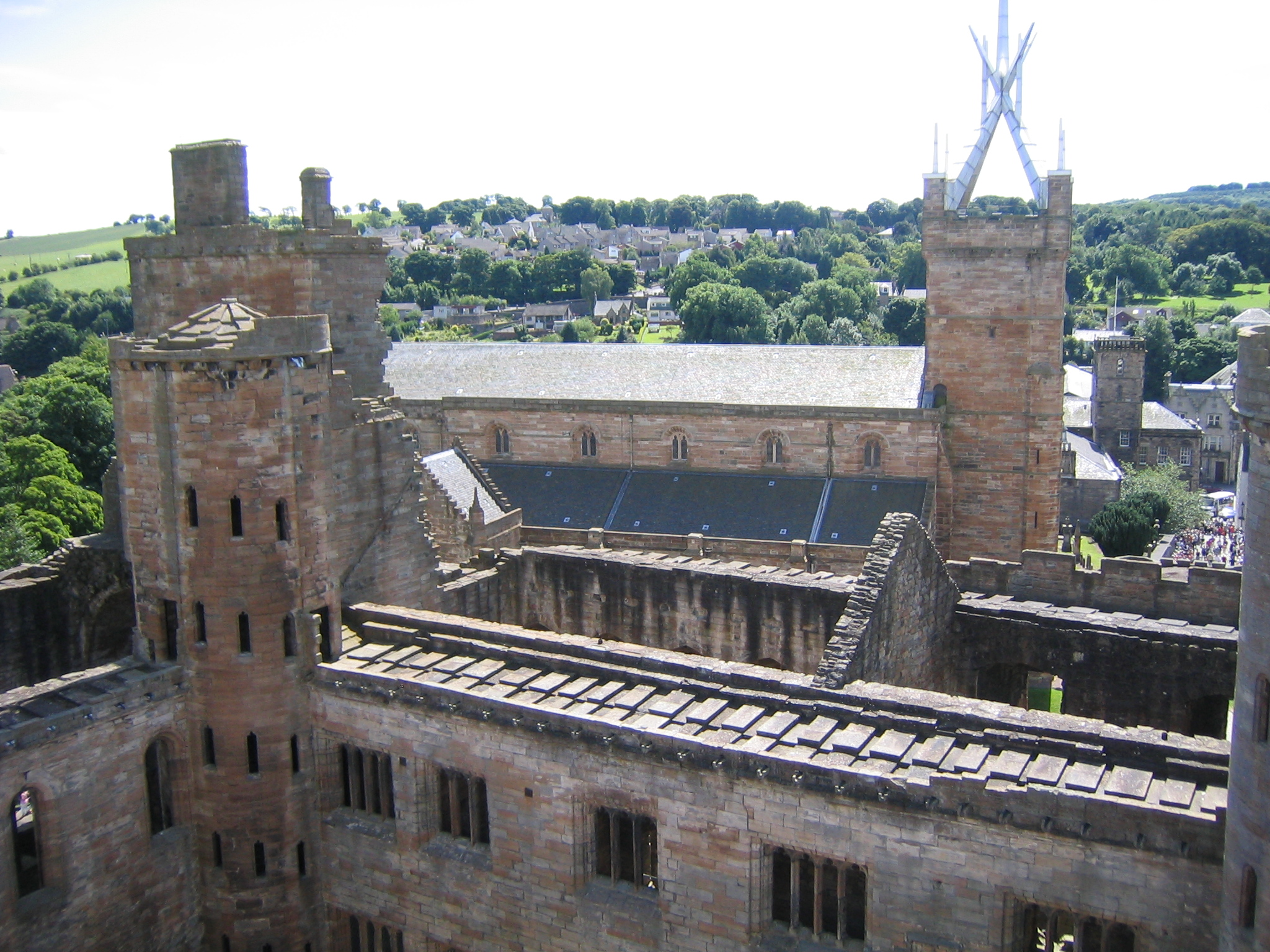
Linlithgow town in the background, St Michael's Church in the mid-ground and the Palace in the foreground

St Michael's Parish Church, Linlithgow, is one of the largest burgh churches in the Church of Scotland. In 2024, it united with St Ninian's Craigmailen (also in Linlithgow), Torphichen Kirk and Avonbridge Church to create the new Linlithgow and Avon Valley Church. St Michael is the town's patron saint; the town's motto is "St Michael is kinde to strangers".

== History ==
The date at which a church was established in Linlithgow is unknown but given that by the 12th century the church at Linlithgow was richly endowed, with multiple daughter chapels, Rev John Ferguson, the Victorian/Edwardian historian of St Michaels, inferred that it was considerably older than the 12th century.

King David I of Scotland granted a charter for the establishment of the church in 1138. The church was built on the site of the older church and was consecrated in 1242. Following a fire in 1424, most of the present building dates from the 15th century. James IV visited building work at the quire in July 1506 and gave the master mason a tip of 9 shillings. Parts of the Church of St Michael were brought into use as they were completed, and the church was completed in 1540. The building was extensively restored in the 19th century.

Built immediately to the south of Linlithgow Palace, the church was much favoured as a place of worship by Scottish Kings and Queens. Robert Lindsay of Pitscottie included in his chronicle a story that, in the weeks before the Battle of Flodden, when James IV and his courtiers were in the church, a mysterious old man with a staff and a blue gown appeared and advised him not to go to war or listen to the advice of women.

Mary, Queen of Scots, was born in Linlithgow Palace on 8 December 1542 and was baptised in St Michael's Church. In 1559, at an early stage of the Scottish Reformation, the Protestant Lords of the Congregation destroyed the statues adorning the exterior and interior of the church as signs of "popishness", and defaced the statue of St Michael which formed part of the structure. Only the statue of St Michael survives: visible at the top of the outer south-west buttress.

Following the Reformation, the interior of the church was reordered. Some traces of pre-Reformation artefacts can still be detected. In 1646, Oliver Cromwell's troops stabled their horses within the nave. Following the departure of the troops, considerable restoration was required.

By the early 19th century, the church was in a very poor physical condition. Although repairs were made, many of the historic features of the church were destroyed, the interior walls were whitewashed, a plaster ceiling replaced a fine 16th-century one and in 1820–21 the stone Crown Tower (a crown steeple similar to that of St Giles' Cathedral) had to be dismantled and removed. Rev Archibald Scott introduced the first church organ in 1871 (following the "Crieff Organ Case" of 1867), and also removed the whitewash from the walls.

While other repairs were completed and the church was rededicated in 1896, the tower was too weakened for restoration of the original crown steeple.

By the late 19th century tastes had changed radically, with the installation of the church's first post-Reformation stained glass windows. In 1964, an aluminium crown designed by Geoffrey Clarke was installed (replacing the Crown Tower removed in 1821).

== Notable ministers ==
Four consecutive ministers served as Moderator:

- Rev Andrew Bell Moderator in 1855
- Rev Donald Macleod Moderator in 1895
- Rev Archibald Scott minister 1870 to 1872, Moderator in 1896
- Rev Thomas Niven, minister 1872 to 1876, Moderator in 1906
- Rev Dr John Ferguson, minister 1878 to 1913, organised the restoration of the church

The church has been served by some notable former ministers, including the Very Revd Dr David Steel (father of the politician David Steel) who was Moderator of the General Assembly of the Church of Scotland in 1974. Rev Dr Liam Fraser was inducted as St Michael's Minister on 14 November 2019.

== See also ==
- List of Church of Scotland parishes
- St Michael's Roman Catholic Church, Linlithgow
