= There Is a Happy Land =

Hymn by Andrew Young

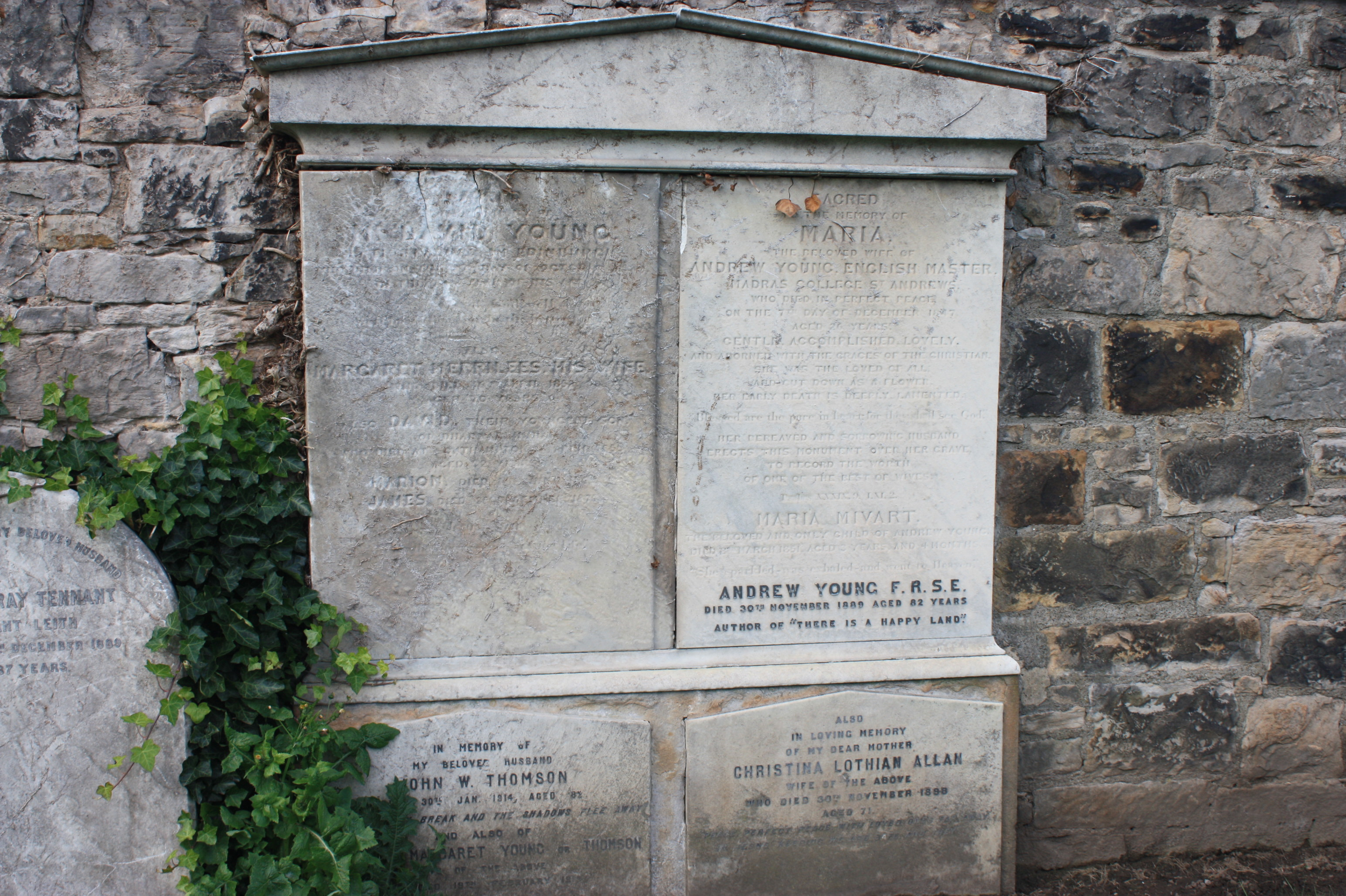
The grave of Andrew Young FRSE, Rosebank Cemetery, Edinburgh

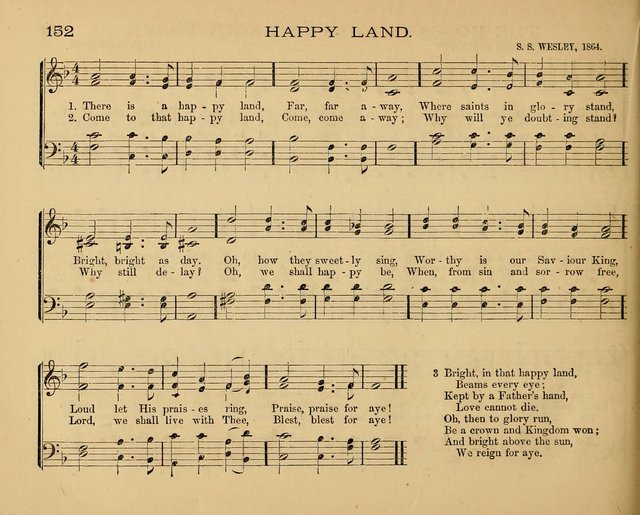
Happy Land hymn sheet in full with music.printed in 1872

There Is a Happy Land is a hymn by Andrew Young (1807–1889), a Scottish schoolmaster, and first published in 1838. It now may be sung to a tune arranged by Leonard P. Breedlove.

Young's grave is on the western wall of Rosebank Cemetery in Edinburgh and refers to his authorship of the hymn.

The hymn has three verses.

The first verse is the most familiar and goes

1 There is a happy land,

Far, far away,

Where saints in glory stand,

Bright, bright as day.

O how they sweetly sing:

Worthy is our Saviour-King!

Loud let his praises ring,

Praise, praise for aye.

== Cultural references ==
The song is known for being quoted or adapted in various contexts:

- The parody "There Is a Boarding-House" by Mark Twain appears in his novel The American Claimant (1892).There is a boarding-house, far far away, Where they have ham and eggs, 3 times a day., Oh, how the boarders yell, When they hear that dinner bell, They give that landlord hell, Three times a day.
- Another parody appears in Keith Waterhouse's 1955 novel There is Happy Land, about a working class childhood in Yorkshire. in this servings of ' 'bread and jam " are the central theme of the words. (1955) There is a happy land, far far away, Where they have jam and bread three times a day. Just one big fam-i-lee, Eggs and bacon they don’t see, Get no sugar in their tea, Three times a day.
- It is a favorite song of Krazy Kat, the main character from George Herriman's eponymous newspaper comic strip (1913-1944), where the song's opening verse is often willingly misspelled as "There is a heppy lend fur fur away... [sic]".
- In the book Little House on the Prairie by Laura Ingalls Wilder, Ma sings "There is a happy land, Far far away, Where saints in glory stand, Bright, bright as day. Oh, to hear the angels sing, Glory to the Lord, our King" while waiting during the night Pa was on his way back home from the town of Independence, Kansas.
- In Wilder's later book By the Shores of Silver Lake Laura recounts railroad men singing the "shocking" lyrics of what is evidently Mark Twain's "There is a Boarding-House" parody, and notes that they stopped when they saw Ma.
- It is parodised in the film Arsenic and Old Lace (1944), sung in the same melody but as "There is a Happy Dale far far away", with that name referring to a mental asylum.
- It is sung in the film The King and I (1956)
- The J.Geils Band song "Centerfold" features a very similar tune being played on a keyboard
- The melody is borrowed in the rock song "Run Runaway" (1983) by Slade
- The melody is used as the base for the Ashira in the song "When you Believe" from the movie "The Prince of Egypt." (1998)
- It appears in the film The Proposition (2005)
