= Robert Horne Stevenson =

Scotting minister (1812–1886)

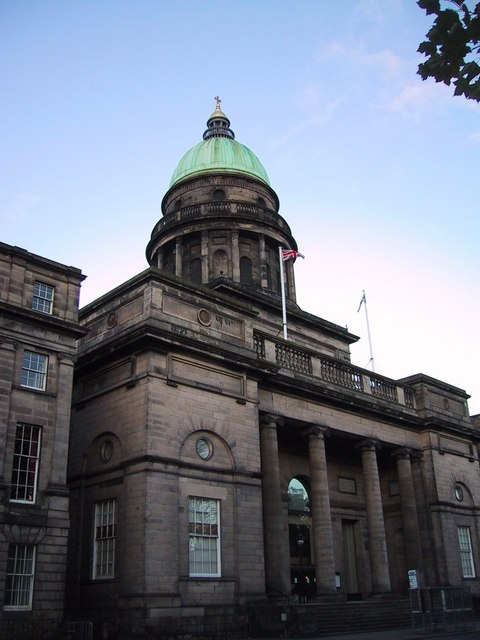
St George's Edinburgh (now known as West Register House

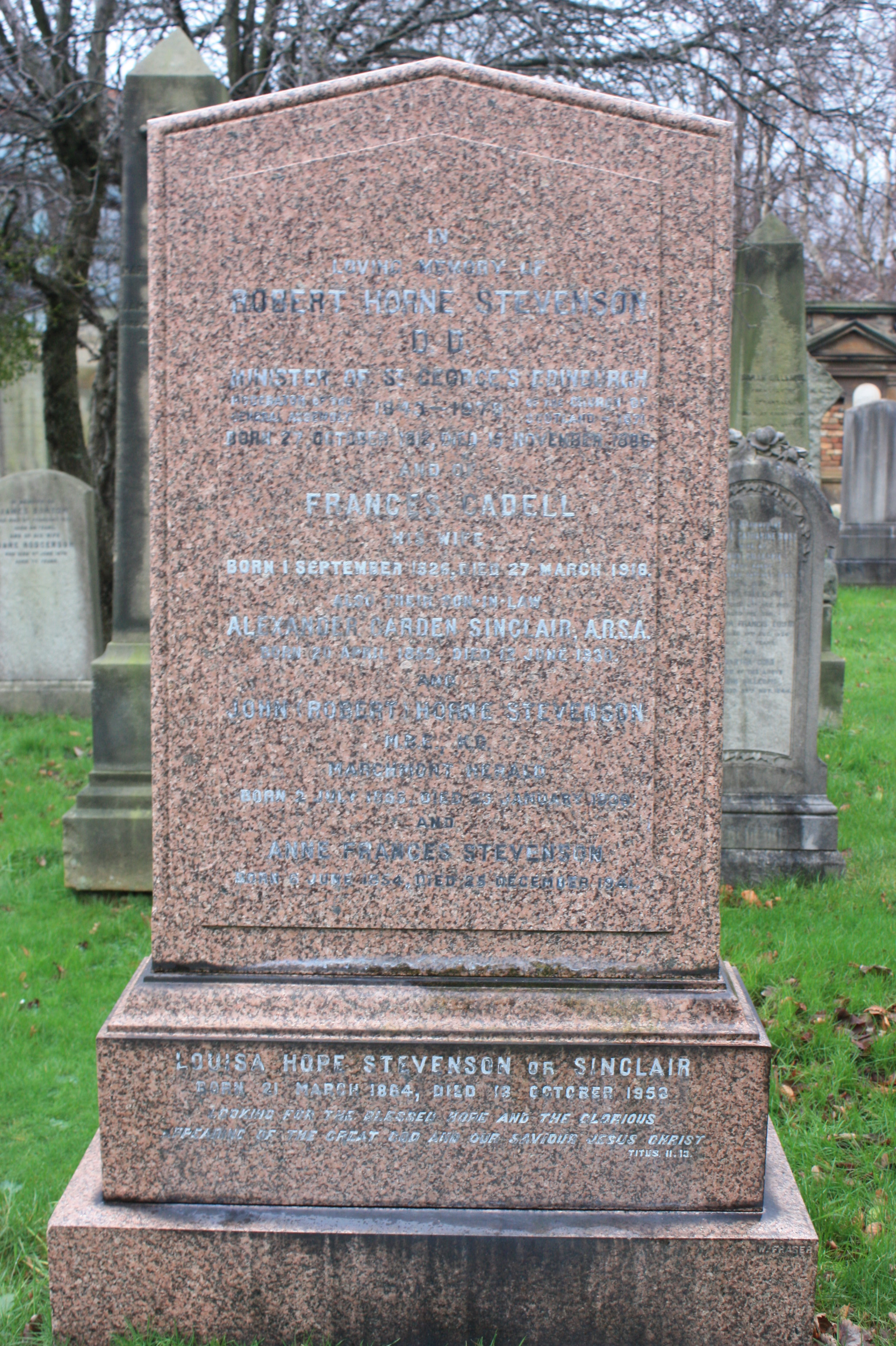
The grave of Robert Horne Stevenson, Dean Cemetery, Edinburgh

Robert Horne Stevenson (27 October 1812 – 15 November 1886) was a Scottish minister who served as Moderator of the General Assembly of the Church of Scotland in 1871 to 1872.

== Life ==
Stevenson was born on 27 October 1812 at Netherinch, Campsie, son of Margaret Horne and farmer John Stevenson of Gartclash. Robert was educated at Campsie School and the universities of Edinburgh and Glasgow. He was licensed by Presbytery of Dumbarton on 23 October 1832, and was tutor to A. J. Dennistoun-Brown of Balloch, West Dunbartonshire, with whom he travelled extensively on the continent of Europe.

He served as missionary in the Second Charge, Kilmarnock, and was assistant at Crieff from 1839, being ordained there 6 May 1840. He was clerk to the Presbytery of Auchterarder from April 1843.

He moved to St George's Church on Charlotte Square in Edunburgh on 28 September 1843, on the departure of Robert Smith Candlish after the Disruption of 1843, Candlish leaving to establish Free St George's. His first Edinburgh home was 22 Walker Street in the West End.

He was moderator of the General Assembly of the Church of Scotland in 1871, and awarded an honorary Doctor of Divinity (DD) by the University of Edinburgh in the same year.

In June 1879, he resigned and his position at St George's was filled by Rev Archibald Scott.

He died on 15 November 1886 and is buried near the centre of the northern 19th-century extension of Dean Cemetery in western Edinburgh. He is buried with his wife and his son-in-law, the artist Alexander Garden Sinclair (1859–1930).

== Family ==
He married Frances Cadell, daughter and coheiress of Robert Cadell of Ratho, on 26 January 1853. They had six children together:

- Anne Frances Stevenson (b. 6 June 1854)
- John (Robert) Horne Stevenson (b. 2 July 1855), Knight of Grace of the Order of St John of Jerusalem in England, M.A., advocate, Unicorn Pursuivant from 1902 to 1925
- Robert Cadell Stevenson (b. 10 April 1859), member of the London Stock Exchange;
- William Black Stevenson, (b. 10 May 1862), M.A., minister of Athelstaneford, and St Columba's, Edinburgh
- Louisa Hope Stevenson, (b. 21 March 1864)
- Henry James Stevenson, (b. 12 July 1867), M.A. W.S., secretary of the North British and Mercantile Insurance Co.

== Publications ==
- "Several Funeral Sermons"
- "Farewell Letter to the Congregation of St George's" (Edinburgh, 1879).
