= Archibald Scott (moderator) =

Scottish minister (1837–1909)

Archibald Scott (1837–1909) was a Scottish minister who served as Moderator of the General Assembly of the Church of Scotland in 1896.

He was instrumental in paving the way for the re-unification of the Church of Scotland with the Free Church of Scotland in 1900.

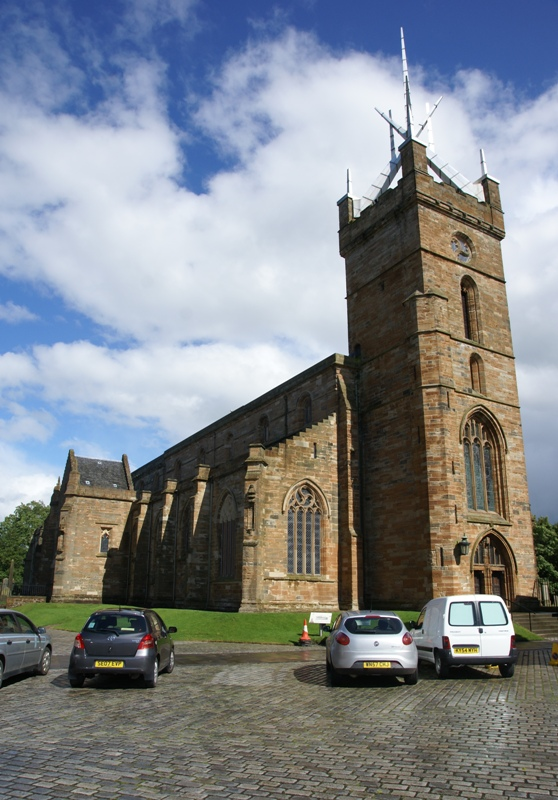
Linlithgow Parish Church - St Michael's

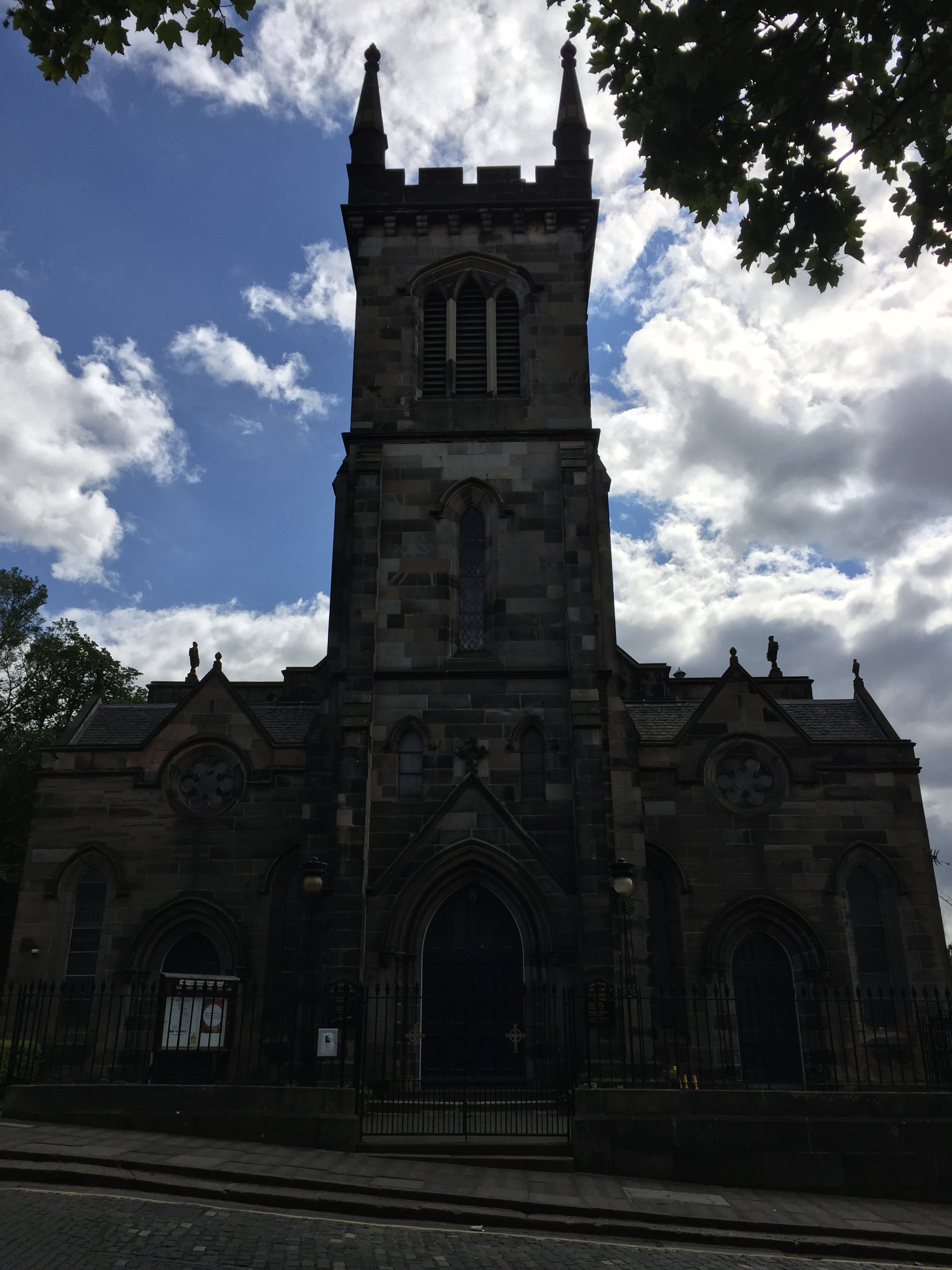
Greenside Church, Edinburgh

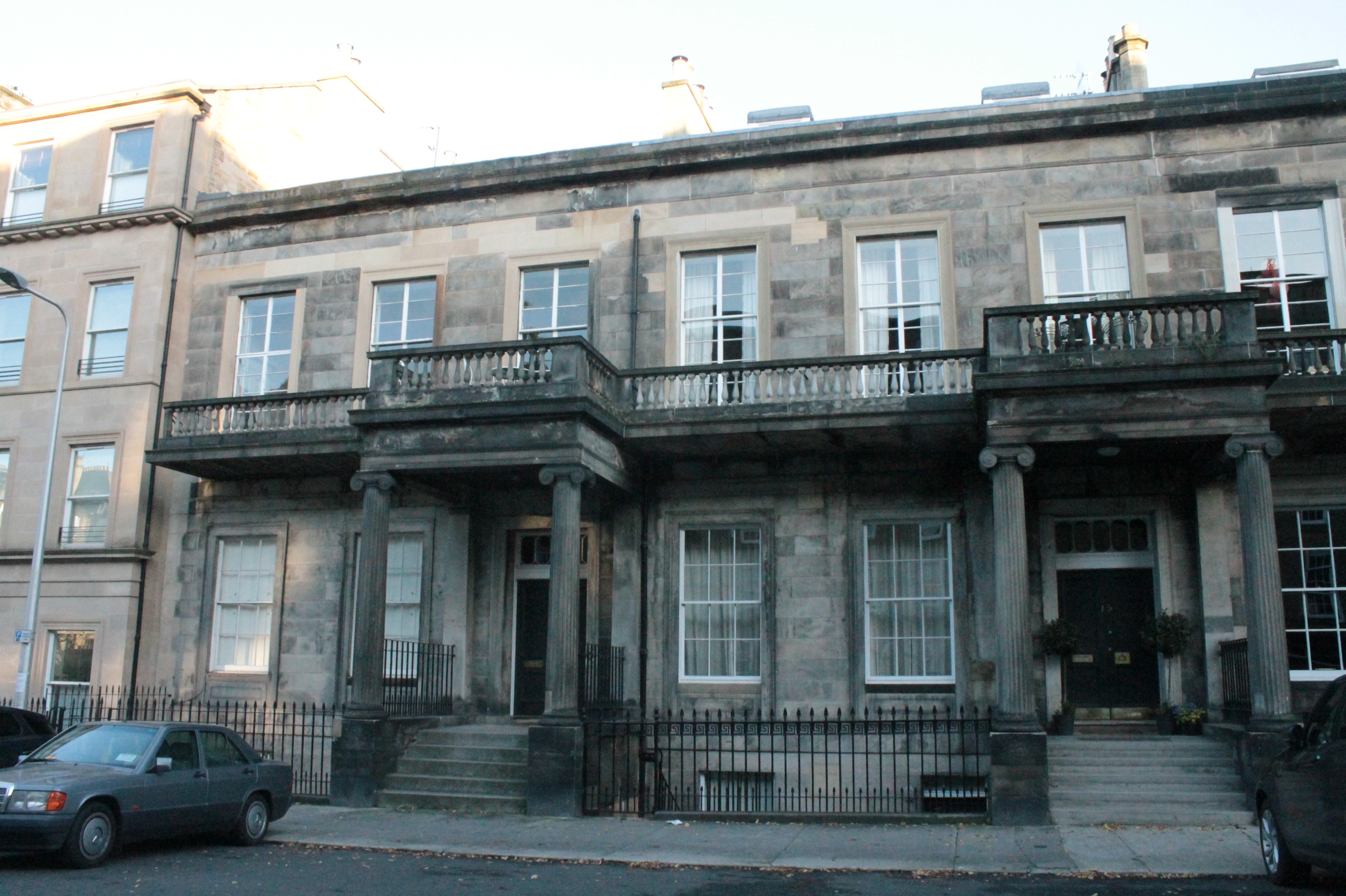
17 Brunswick Street, Edinburgh (left)

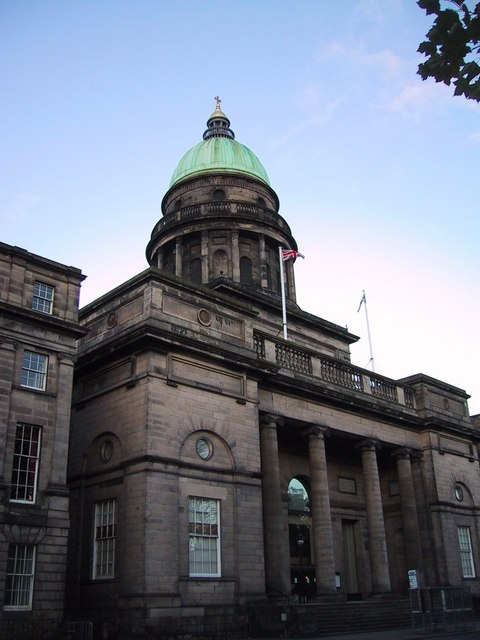
Stt George's Church in Edinburgh- now known as West Register House

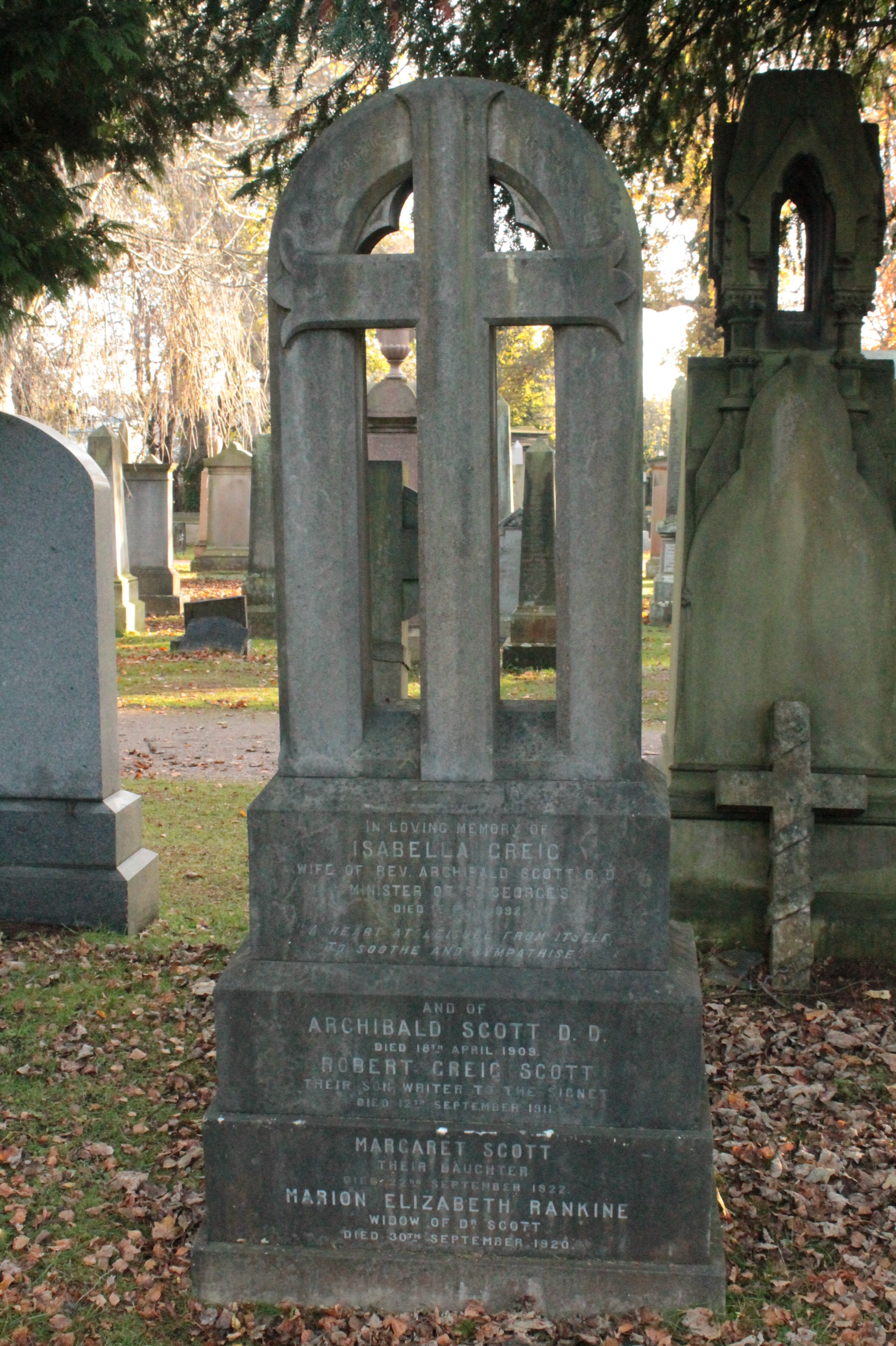
The grave of the Very Rev Archibald Scott, Dean Cemetery

== Life ==
He was born on 18 September 1837 at Bogton Farm near Cadder, north of Bishopbriggs, Glasgow, the sixth son of Margaret (née Brown) and James Scott, a farmer. He was educated at the parish school which was run by the Church of Scotland. His later education was at Glasgow High School. His classmates included James Bryce.

From 1845 onwards the Church of Scotland required trainee ministers to study for four years for a general MA degree prior to studying divinity. Scott studied for his general degree at the University of Glasgow, at that time located on the High Street close to Glasgow Cathedral. His studied mathematics under William Thomson, Lord Kelvin, Greek was under Edmund Lushington, and Latin from Professor Ramsay. Lacking skills in mathematics and physics he graduated with a BA rather than MA. In autumn 1855 he began studying divinity at the University of Glasgow. He studied theology under Professor Hill. He was licensed to preach by the Presbytery of Glasgow in June 1859. He began as assistant to Rev Dr Archibald Watson of St Matthew's Church in Glasgow.

In the autumn of 1859 he moved to Clackmannan as assistant to Rev Peter Balfour (known as "Perpendicular Peter") the father of John Balfour. Here he started a lifelong friendship with John. He also befriended the young Alexander Bruce during this period.

In January 1860 he was ordained as first minister of the East Church in Perth (St John's, close to the River Tay) replacing Rev Elder Cumming. Scott was only 22 years old at this time. He left this major city church in 1863 to move to the much smaller parish church in Abernethy, in place of Rev David Duncan, under the patronage of the Earl of Mansfield. Although the Church of Scotland had major competition in Abernethy in the form of the Free Church and United Presbyterian Church, Scott nevertheless persuaded the Church of Scotland to fund a new manse for his use during what was to be his brief tenure.

Meanwhile, in Glasgow a group of businessmen (including Sir John Maxwell of Pollok, in discussion with Rev Matthew Leishman of Govan Old Parish Church, were planning a new church to serve the Kinning Park district of Glasgow, as a Quoad sacra church. It was deducted that Archibald Scott would be a good choice as minister, and in 1864 he came, at first to a temporary wooden structure, and then to the newly built church (1867) was known as the Maxwell Church after its main funder, and by then deceased, Lord Maxwell. Soon after construction, and Rev John Cunningham's critical "Crieff Organ Case" was decided in court, Scott organised the insertion of a church organ (not previously encouraged by the Church of Scotland).

He remained in Glasgow at the Maxwell Church for four years. In July 1869 he was translated to Linlithgow Parish Church (St Michael's) in West Lothian. This imposing church stands next to Linlithgow Palace. He did not take up the post until September 1870. Here he succeeded his friend, Rev Donald Macleod who later was also his immediate predecessor as Moderator (1895). But again his stay was short-lived, he was chosen to replace the late Rev Dr William Glover (1801-1871) of Greenside Church in Edinburgh in September 1871. Greenside was not a huge church, but had an important and influential catchment in the residents of Calton Hill: Royal Terrace and Regent Terrace. Scott at this time lived at 17 Brunswick Street, just north of Greenside Church. This imposing Georgian townhouse was designed by William Henry Playfair.

His parish and congregation were growing rapidly due to new housing projects on Leith Walk, Easter Road and London Road. Scott set about raising funds for a new church, Holyrood Abbey Church to be sited to the east (eventually built at the junction of London Road and Marionville Road in 1899).

Amongst his congregation and Kirk Session was the aged Andrew Young (who ran the Sunday School and Charles John Pearson.

During this period (from 1873) he was appointed one of the trustees to the Baird Trust: overseeing the wise use of the immense £500,000 left by James Baird to promote good works on behalf of the Church of Scotland (this equates to £10 million in modern terms).

In 1876 the University of Glasgow awarded him an honorary doctorate (DD). Following the Education (Scotland) Act 1872, Scott was elected onto the First Edinburgh School Board. Scott emphasised that a good primary education was futile if a person did not then continue to read. He was Chairman of the Edinburgh School Board from 1878 to 1882.

In 1880 he replaced Rev Robert Horne Stevenson (who resigned in June 1879) as minister of St George's Church on Charlotte Square in Edinburgh's New Town. He was then living at 7 Rothesay Place. St George's had an even more impressive and affluent congregation than Greenside: incorporating the residents of Charlotte Square, the Moray Estate, Edinburgh's West End and the First New Town. His Kirk Session at St George's included Thomas Graham Murray, Sir John Cheyne, his brother Harry Cheyne (Session Clerk) and James McKerrell Brown.

In 1890 he was living at 16 Rothesay Place, west of the church.

In 1896 he was elected Moderator of the General Assembly, the highest position in the Church of Scotland. He was succeeded in 1897 by Very Rev William Mair.

He spent from 1895 to 1900 striving to re-unify the Church of Scotland with the Free Church. This was largely successful with the merge taking place in 1900. However, his later years were overshadowed by the multiple court cases regarding the ownership issues of the churches themselves, mainly caused by the fact that the merge, though substantial, was not complete, and the Free Church continued as a body. In many parishes the caused the requirement to build another church. This huge cost, within a limited time-frame, almost bankrupted the church. Moreover, due to undue optimism, almost all churches were created of a size capable of holding the entire congregation of the parish. This resulted in most of the new churches being less than half full. The entire affair broke Scott's spirit.

He was replaced at St Georges by Rev Gavin Lang Pagan (later killed serving as a Chaplain in WW1 at the Battle of Arras (1917)).

He was in poor health from January 1909 and died in North Berwick on 18 April 1909.

The Maxwell Church was demolished in 1976.

== Family ==
On 4 June 1861 he married Isabella Greig (d.1892), daughter of Robert Greig, a merchant in Perth. Of their six children two survived to adulthood: Robert Greig Scott WS (1878-1911) and Margaret Scott.

In July 1894 he married Marion Elizabeth Rankine (d.1920), daughter of Very Rev John Rankine of Sorn.

== Artistic recognition ==
His portrait by George Reid RSA hangs in the offices of the Church of Scotland.

A bronze bust by James Pittendrigh Macgillivray RSA was previously in the entrance lobby of St George's Church.

== Publications ==
- Buddhism and Christianity (1889) - Croall Lecture
- Sacrifice: Its Prophecy and Fulfilment (1892) Baird Lecture
