= Murdo McDonald (footballer) =

Scottish footballer (1901–1934)

Personal information
- Full name: Murdoch McDonald
- Date of birth: 1 July 1901
- Place of birth: Redding, Scotland
- Date of death: 22 December 1934 (aged 33)
- Place of death: Falkirk, Scotland
- Position: Inside forward

Senior career*
Years	Team	Apps	(Gls)
1919–1920	Grange Rovers		
1920–1921	St Ninian's Thistle		
1921–1922	Cowdenbeath		
1922–1923	Bo'ness		
1923–1924	Rangers		
1924–1926	Bo'ness		
1926–1930	Reading	65	(13)
1930–1931	Brighton & Hove Albion	10	(1)
1931–1932	Bo'ness		
1932	Bray Unknowns		
1932	Bo'ness		
Total		75	(14)
- * Club domestic league appearances and goals

Murdoch McDonald (1 July 1901 – 22 December 1934) was a Scottish footballer who played in the Football League for Brighton & Hove Albion and Reading. He died of sepsis after cutting his hand.
