= David Ritchie (moderator) =

Scottish minister (1763–1844)

David Ritchie FRSE (1763–1844) was a Scottish minister who served as Moderator of the General Assembly of the Church of Scotland for the year 1814/15.

== Life ==
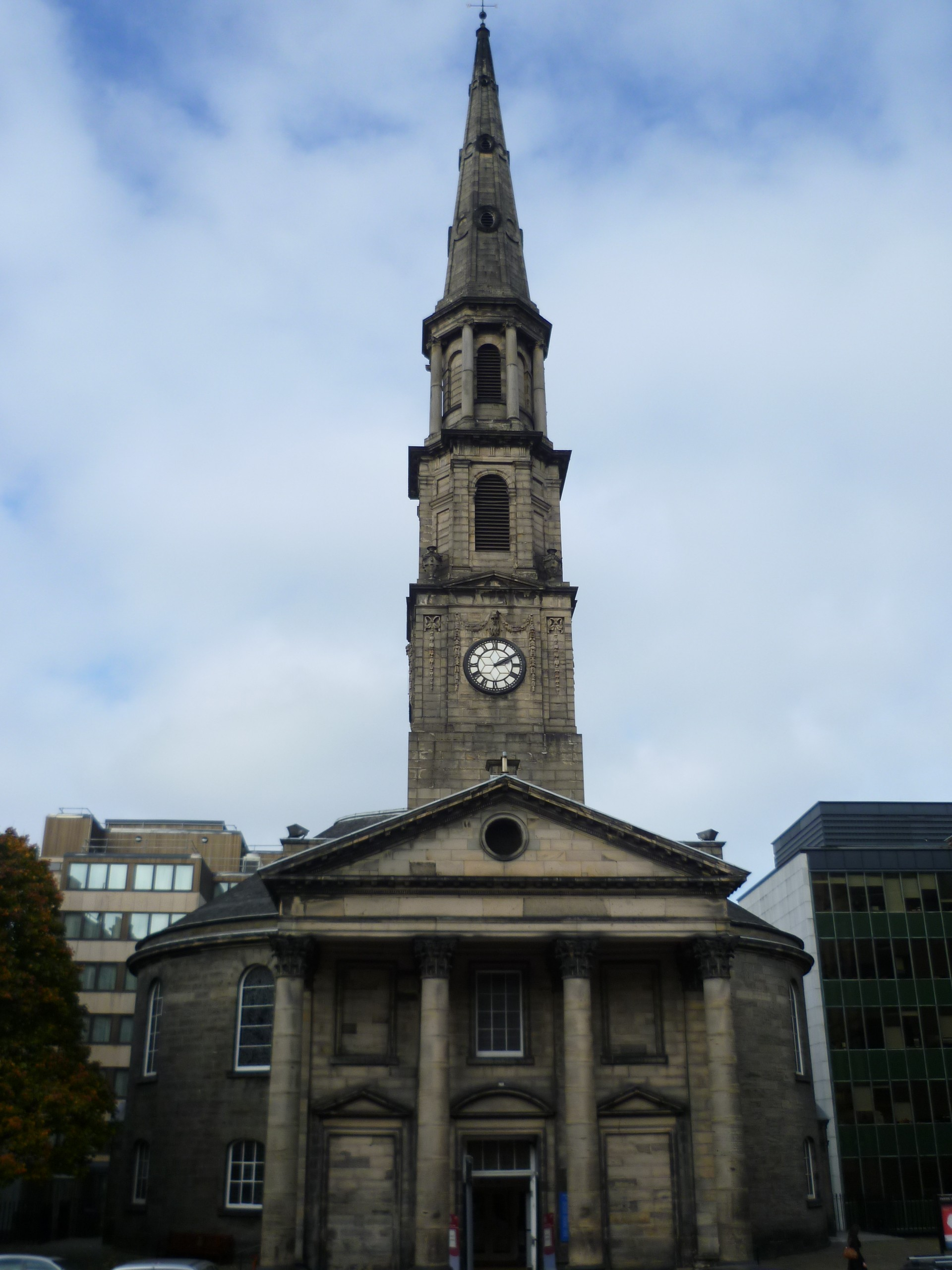
St. Andrew's Church, George Street Edinburgh

He was born in Methven in Perthshire in 1763. He studied divinity at the University of St Andrews, and was licensed to preach by the Church of Scotland in 1789.

Awaiting a patron, he spent some time as the schoolteacher at Trinity Gask, a small village west of Perth. Not until February 1798 did he obtain a post as an assistant minister, rising to minister in October, at Penicuik south of Edinburgh. He then moved in quick succession to Kilmarnock (1800) and then to Second charge of St Andrew's Church on George Street in Edinburgh (1801). In Edinburgh he also served as Chaplain to the 1st Battalion Edinburgh Volunteers.

In 1808 he left the ministry to become Professor of Logic and Metaphysics at the University of Edinburgh. At that time he lived at 104 Princes Street. In 1811 he was elected a Fellow of the Royal Society of Edinburgh. His proposers were Dr John Barclay, Thomas Charles Hope, and Rev Andrew Brown. The University of Edinburgh awarded him an honorary doctorate (DD) in 1813.

From 1802 he was Junior Clerk of the General Assembly and in 1814 he was elected Moderator. He was awarded an honorary Doctor of Divinity (DD) by Edinburgh University in 1813. He was appointed Honorary Chaplain (Pontifex Maximus) of the Harveian Society of Edinburgh and remanned in the role until 1832.

He retired in 1836 and died at home on 10 January 1844, at 28 Broughton Place in east Edinburgh. He is buried in New Calton Burial Ground.

== Family ==
In 1811 he married Margaret Pearson (d.1840) daughter of William Pearson of Kippenross. They had two daughters: Jane Frances Ritchie (1812-1838), Margaret AnnRitchie (1814-1826).
