= Murdo Ewen Macdonald =

Scottish minister

Rev Murdo Ewen Macdonald (28 August 1914 – 6 June 2004) was a Scottish minister.

== Early life ==
Macdonald was born in Harris and educated at Sir Edward Scott’s junior school Drinishadder School in Tarbert and later in Kingussie secondary school. In 1933, Macdonald went on to study arts and divinity at the University of St Andrews. While there, he became Scottish Universities middle-weight boxing champion and a friend of John Brown, father of Gordon Brown. In 1939, he was ordained as a Church of Scotland minister and inducted to the parish of Portree.

=== Military career ===
During World War II, he served as a chaplain with the Queen's Own Cameron Highlanders in Aruba, and with the 1st Parachute Brigade. He was wounded and taken prisoner of war during Operation Torch in North Africa in November 1942, and spent two and a half years in prison, including time in Stalag Luft III. There he was involved in preparations for the Great Escape. During this time he acted as a chaplain to United States prisoners, for which he was awarded the Bronze Star Medal for his "inspiring leadership and example" and "exceptional counselling to those suffering from mental depression and deterioration".

Returning to Scotland, he served as minister at Partick Old Parish Church, Glasgow from 1947 to 1949 and then at St George's West Parish Church, Edinburgh from 1949 to 1963.

=== Personal life and death ===
He was appointed professor of practical theology at Trinity College, Glasgow in 1966. He retired in 1984. He was awarded an honorary doctor of divinity degree by the University of St Andrews. He died in Glasgow in 2004.
