= James Mellis =

Scottish surgeon (1781–1846)

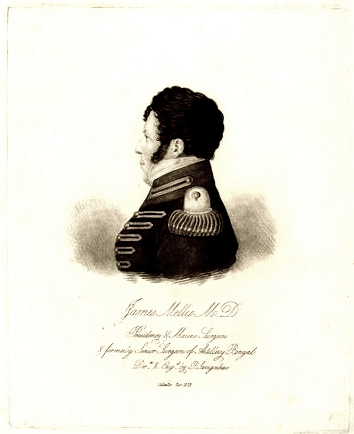
Dr James Mellis, 1822 engraving

James Mellis MD (1781–1846) was a Scottish surgeon in the Bengal Presidency of the East India Company. He is now known as an early writer on dengue fever.

== Life ==
He was the son of the Aberdeen brewer James Mellis and his wife Mary Stuart; his sister Mary married the Wesleyan Methodist minister George Douglas and had three children, the eldest being James Douglas (1800–1886), a medical man in Canada.

Mellis graduated M.A. at Marischal College in 1799. He became a Member of the Royal College of Surgeons in 1802. He served as surgeon on the Indiaman Fame in 1803–4, on station at Madeira. In 1806 he was examined for his degree of M.D. at Marischal College, and that year joined the Bengal Army, with rank Assistant Surgeon.

Mellis was ranked as Surgeon in 1818. He attended the missionary William Carey in 1823. Around 1830 he was attached to the 9th Regiment Native Infantry, posted at Neemuch, and took a furlough period. In 1837 he became a Superintending Surgeon, and remained posted at Neemuch.

James Mellis departed from Bombay on 1 April 1845 for Suez on the Cleopatra with his wife and a child. He died on 17 March 1846 at 169 Prospect Place, Maida Hill, London.

== 1824 Calcutta dengue epidemic ==
In 1824 Calcutta suffered an epidemic of an infectious fever of wide prevalence, on which Mellis wrote a paper for the Transactions of the Medical and Physical Society of Calcutta. It was noticed in the Edinburgh Medical and Surgical Journal in 1826, in an anonymous review of the initial Transactions volume of 1825. James Macadam Hare was President of the Society, with Mellis as Vice-President.

Others who presented papers on the 1824 Calcutta epidemic were William Twining and Henry Cavell (1797–1827); Mellis had priority of publication, in the first Transactions volume, with "Remarks on the Inflammatory Fever or Epidemic lately prevalent in Calcutta and its Environs". Further, Richard Kennedy at Baroda and the army surgeon James Mouat (died 1848) wrote in 1825, all these papers appearing in the Transactions. William Aitken attributed to this group "the earliest accounts of this disease".

Mellis and others traced the epidemic back to Aden. His name for the disease was "epidemic inflammatory fever".

James Christie (1829–1882), who published a book in 1876 on the epidemiology of cholera, turned in 1881 to dengue fever. He identified the dengue context as an 1822–3 epidemic in Africa of a fever there named "kidinga", spreading in 1824 to the Bombay Presidency, then Rangoon and so arriving in Calcutta. On Zanzibar in 1870, Christie had identified "kidinga" and "dengue", though the latter at that period was a dustbin category.

Norman Chevers in A commentary on the diseases of India (1886) rehearsed the Transactions papers in historical context. By then it could be said that the 1824 dengue epidemic in the British Raj was followed by major outbreaks in 1853 and 1871–2.

== Honours and awards ==
Mellis was a Fellow of the Royal College of Physicians of Edinburgh and Fellow of the Royal College of Surgeons of London.

== Family ==
Mellis married in 1810 Elizabeth Masterton, in Bengal. His daughter Eliza Helen married in 1836 in Calcutta Capt. Charles Dallas (1803–1840), second son of Charles Dallas, as his second wife. From a time when she was still young, Mellis was the guardian of his niece Ann Elizabeth Douglas. She married in 1819 David Dale (1795–1830), in Calcutta, and was mother of Sir David Dale, 1st Baronet.

Mellis supported the medical career of his nephew James Douglas, by covering the costs of the latter's membership of the Royal College of Surgeons in London, around 1820 (via William Fairlie's agency). On the return voyage from India in 1823 of a journey he had made, during which he had encountered his uncle and discussed medical matters at a hospital in Dum Dum, Douglas was faced with cases of cholera on board the ship after leaving Sagar Island. He followed a treatment he had learned at the hospital.

== Legacy ==
In 1826 Mellis presented to the Marischal Museum some Burmese antiquities. They had been imported on the Sir Charles Forbes by its captain Alexander Duthie.
