= Sir David Dale, 1st Baronet =

British businessman (1829–1906)

Sir David Dale
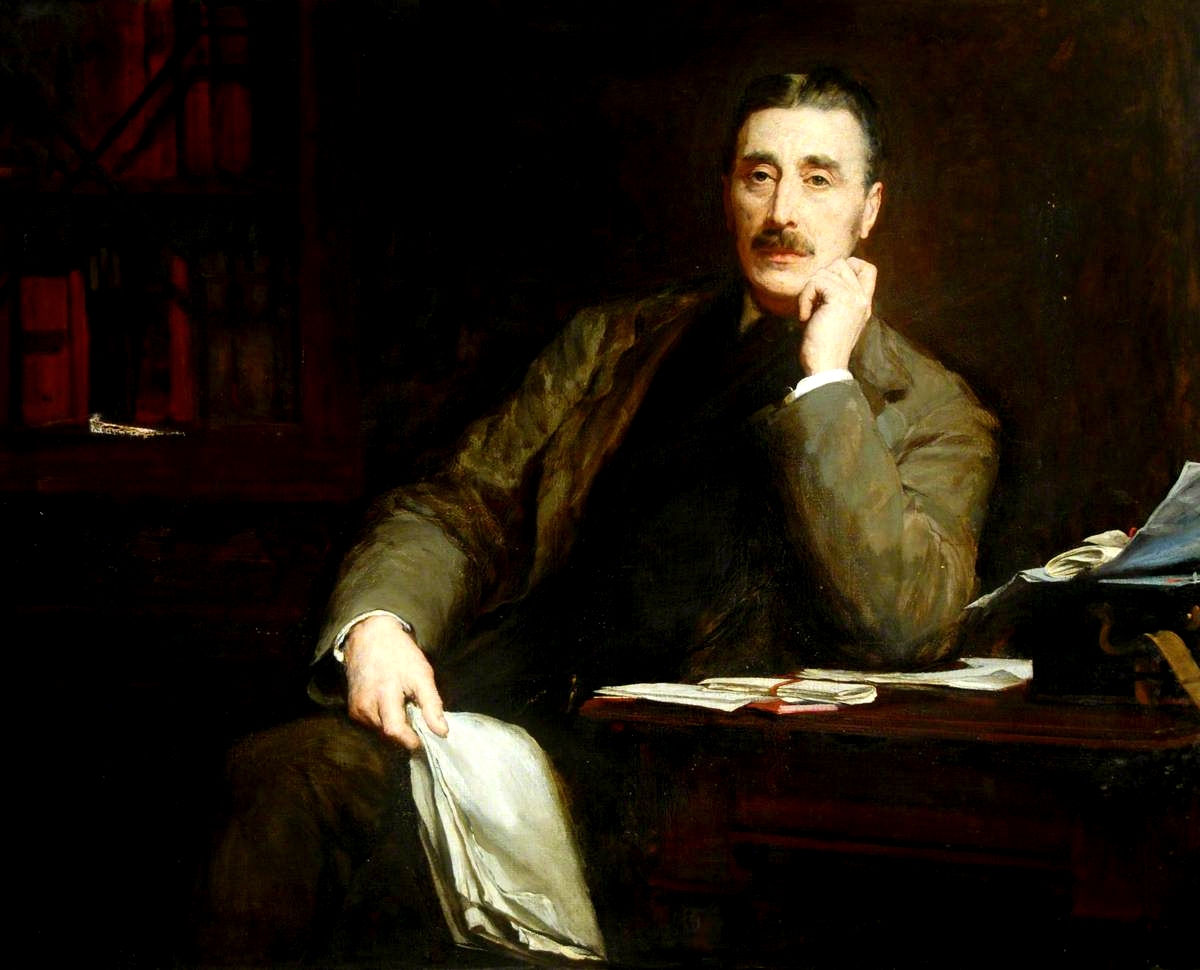
- Born: December 11, 1829; Murshidabad, Bengal, India
- Died: April 28, 1906 (aged 76); North Eastern Hotel, York, United Kingdom
- Occupation: Businessman
- Known for: Industrial dispute arbitration
- Spouse: Annie Backhouse Robson (m. 1853; died 1886) Alice Frederica Milbank (m. 1888; died 1902)
- Children: 4 (2 step children)

Sir David Dale, 1st Baronet (1829–1906) was a British businessman, ironmaster and industrialist. For much of his business career associated with the companies largely controlled by the Pease family, he made his way in financial management and became a prominent figure in north-east England. From age 40 onwards, he was engaged in arbitration and labour issues, and received recognition with a baronetcy.

== Background and early life ==
He was born on 11 December 1829 at Berhampore, Murshidabad district, Bengal, the younger of two sons, in a family of three children, of David Dale of the East India Company's service. His father was a judge of the city court there. Dale's mother was Ann Eliza(beth) Douglas (1802–1879); the couple married at Calcutta in 1819.

=== Paternal background ===
David Dale senior (1795–1830) was a close friend of William Carey. He had at some point acted as Political Resident to the Nawab of Bengal, with seat in the Murshidabad district, at Berhampore. He was the son of James Dale (1753–1819) of Glasgow and his wife Margaret Haddow of Lanark. James Dale was a manager at the New Lanark mills, agent and broker, the son of William Dale and his second wife Martha Dunlop, and a younger brother of David Dale the industrialist.

=== Maternal background ===
Ann Douglas's father was the Rev. George Douglas, a Wesleyan Methodist minister, itinerant from 1796. He was resident in Aberdeen in 1798 and Peel, Isle of Man in 1801–1802; Ann was born in Ramsey, Isle of Man. He married Mary Mellis, daughter of the Aberdeen brewer James Mellis and his wife Mary Stuart, and died in 1853; their son Dr James Mellis worked for the East India Company. He published in 1824 an article on the disease now known as dengue, calling it "inflammatory fever", in Calcutta. He was guardian to Ann Douglas: "At a very early age, Miss Douglas went to Calcutta, under the guardianship of an uncle who held an important military appointment there[...]"

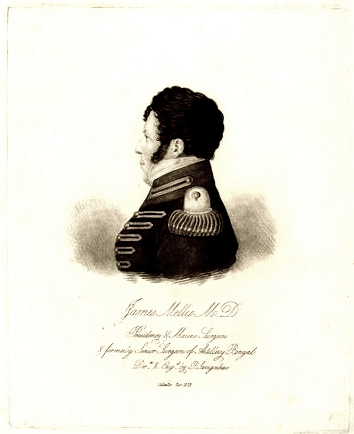
Dr. James Mellis, 1822 engraving, who was guardian to David Dale's mother

She had two brothers who became medical men in Canada, James Douglas (1800–1886), and George Mellis Douglas (bapt. 1809 – 1864), father of Archibald Lucius Douglas and Campbell Mellis Douglas. James Douglas visited India in the early 1820s, travelling out on the Theodosia, and staying at the Wesleyan mission in Royapettah run by James Lynch (1775–1858), a friend of his father. He travelled back on the Competitor as a surgeon in 1823.

=== Siblings ===
Dale's elder brother James Douglas Dale (1820–1865) joined the Indian army on the Madras establishment, and became lieutenant-colonel. He married in 1848 Williamina Buchanan, daughter of David Snodgrass Buchanan of Cunninghead, Ayrshire. His sister Mary Christina or Christiania (1823–1884) married in 1869 Joseph William Leaycraft of Île d'Orléans, Quebec, who was in business with John William Dunscomb.

== Family return to the United Kingdom ==
David Dale senior died on board the Providence on 23 June 1830, during a voyage back to the United Kingdom with his wife and children. Ann Dale settled at Darlington, and in 1841 joined the Society of Friends there.

Dale was educated privately at Edinburgh, Durham, and Stockton, and was brought up among Quakers. From the period when she was applying to become a Quaker, his mother knew Edward Pease, local pioneer of railways. Pease bought a house for her in 1854.

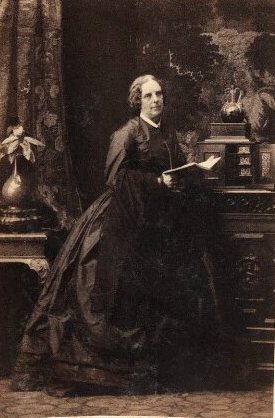
Ann Eliza Dale, 1862 photograph

== Career and the Pease business empire ==
Dale's career began in 1846, as a clerk in the office of the Wear Valley Railway. In 1854 he was appointed through the influence of Joseph Pease as company secretary to the Middlesbrough and Guisborough Railway. In 1858 the Stockton and Darlington Railway consolidated all its railway operations. That year, Dale went into partnership with William Bouch and became lessee of the Shildon locomotive works. He succeeded Oswald Gilkes (died 1855) as financial officer of the Shildon Works Company, haulage contractors to the Stockton and Darlington Railway. The long arm of the Pease family was demonstrated when Dale's clerk at Shildon, John Anthony Thistlethwaite, had to leave the company because he was involved with the volunteer movement, incompatible with Quaker thinking.

The Consett Iron Company was the successor to a failed company; the Pease family was heavily involved in the restructuring, particularly through Joseph Whitwell Pease. Dale acted in the required liquidation. He also became, as in effect the Pease nominee, a director and manager of the new company. He shared the managing director position with Jonathan Priestman II; and later moved to being chairman. He brought in William Jenkins (1825–1895) from Dowlais Ironworks to act as general manager, in 1869.

Dale was also managing partner of J. W. Pease & Co., later Pease & Partners Ltd., and chairman of companies working iron ore mines near Bilbao. In 1881 he became a director of the North Eastern Railway Company, having previously served as director of the Stockton and Darlington railway. He left the Society of Friends in the later 1880s.

On the formation of the Dunderland Iron Ore Company in 1902, Dale was appointed chairman. He was an active member of the Durham Coal Owners' Association and of the Cleveland Mine Owners' Association.

== Shipbuilding in County Durham ==
In 1866 Dent moved into engineering and shipbuilding enterprises with Richardson, Denton, Duck & Co. of Stockton-on-Tees, Denton, Gray & Co. of Hartlepool, and Thomas Richardson & Sons, also of Hartlepool. Dale became vice-chairman of this group as a joint undertaking. Besides synergy, the motivation was based on financial fashion in the area of limited liability under the 1855 Act. The planned merger was not successful, being brought to an abrupt end by the banking collapse of Overend, Gurney and Company.

Dale retained an interest in Richardson, Denton, Duck & Co., shipbuilders and marine engineers, and Denton, Gray & Co. where the shipbuilder John Punshon Denton partnered the investor William Gray. He was appointed liquidator of Pile, Spence & Co. of West Hartlepool, also brought down by the Overend Gurney crash.

== Politics ==
In politics Dale was a Liberal, President of the Darlington Liberal Association, and member of the General Committee of the National Liberal Federation. Preoccupied by business interests, he declined to contest a seat in parliament.

== Industrial arbitrator and labour issues ==
As an industrial arbitrator, Dale was one of the pioneers. The British movement towards conciliation and arbitration of industrial disputes had origins in the practice of A. J. Mundella that came to notice at the beginning of the 1860s, and of Rupert Alfred Kettle. A board of arbitration was formed for the iron and steel trade of the north of England in March 1869, and Dale was its first chairman. It was a conspicuous success. Kettle, Thomas Hughes, Joseph Pease and Robert Spence Watson were regularly involved. Dale helped to found the Iron and Steel Institute in 1869, and acted as its first treasurer until 1895, when he was elected president. On 29 March 1894 Mundella said in the House of Commons

There are many men at this moment in England who for the last 20 year's have been doing admirable service as arbitrators or umpires. It is impossible to over-estimate the value of those services. Mr. David Dale, for example, has been engaged in this work for more than a quarter of a century, and has done the noblest service to the industries of the country.

The reformer Henry Solly, who struggled to interest major employers as secretary of the Club Union, singled out Dale as especially helpful "as regarded practical co-operation".

Dale was appointed to royal commissions including those on trade depression (1885–6), and on mining royalties (1889–93). At the Berlin labour conference of 1890, set up by Kaiser Wilhelm II, Dale was one of the British representatives. The section of the royal commission on labour (1891–4, one of three sections) chaired by Dale took in particular extended evidence from Keir Hardie in 1892. Later that year Dale engaged from the chair with Tom Mann's evidence on the eight hour day.

in 1895–6 Dale was involved in the short-lived Industrial Union of Employers and Employed. Dale and other representatives of employers were joined by the trade unionists Edward Trow and Charles Hobson, Trow being also a party to the arbitration board headed by Dale as a joint secretary, and a Darlington Liberal.

== Later life and legacy ==
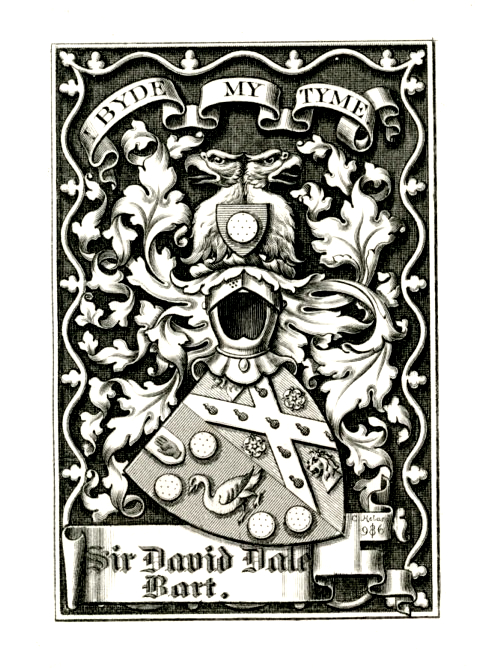
Armorial bookplate of Sir David Dale, Dale impaling Milbank

In 1888 Dale was High Sheriff of Durham. The University of Durham made him an honorary D.C.L. in 1895. He was created a baronet in 1896.

Sir David Dale died at York on 28 April 1906, and was buried at Darlington. In his honour the Sir David Dale Chair of Economics was instituted at Armstrong College, Newcastle-on-Tyne, in 1909, and a memorial Lecture on labour problems at Darlington in 1910.

== Family ==
Dale was twice married:

1. On 27 January 1853 to Annie Backhouse Robson (d. 1886), only daughter of Edward Robson (1791–1819) of Darlington and his wife Jane Backhouse (1787–1873), sister of Jonathan Backhouse (1779–1842). Annie was the widow of Henry Whitwell of Kendal. They had a son, James Backhouse Dale, who succeeded to the baronetcy, and one daughter; Whitwell was a nephew of Edward Pease. The marriage brought Dale two step-children: Maria Jane Whitwell, married William Lucas, and Edward Robson Whitwell, married Mary Janet Leatham, daughter of Edward Leatham.
2. On 2 August 1888 to Alice Frederica Milbank (d. 1902), daughter of Sir Frederick Milbank, 1st Baronet.

== Notes ==
Baronetage of the United Kingdom
New creation	Baronet (of West Lodge); 1895–1906	Succeeded by James Backhouse Dale
