= James Hare =

James Hare may refer to:

- James Butler Hare (1918–1966), U.S. congressman from South Carolina
- James M. Hare (1910–1980), Michigan Secretary of State
- Jimmy Hare (1856–1946), photographer for Colliers
- James Hare (boxer) (born 1976), English boxer of the 1990s and 2000s
- James Hare (judge) (1906–1969), Alabama politician and judge
- James Hare (British politician) (1747–1804), English politician, diplomat and wit
- James Macadam Hare (1777–1831), Scottish physician
