= Igneous intrusion =

Body of intrusive igneous rocks

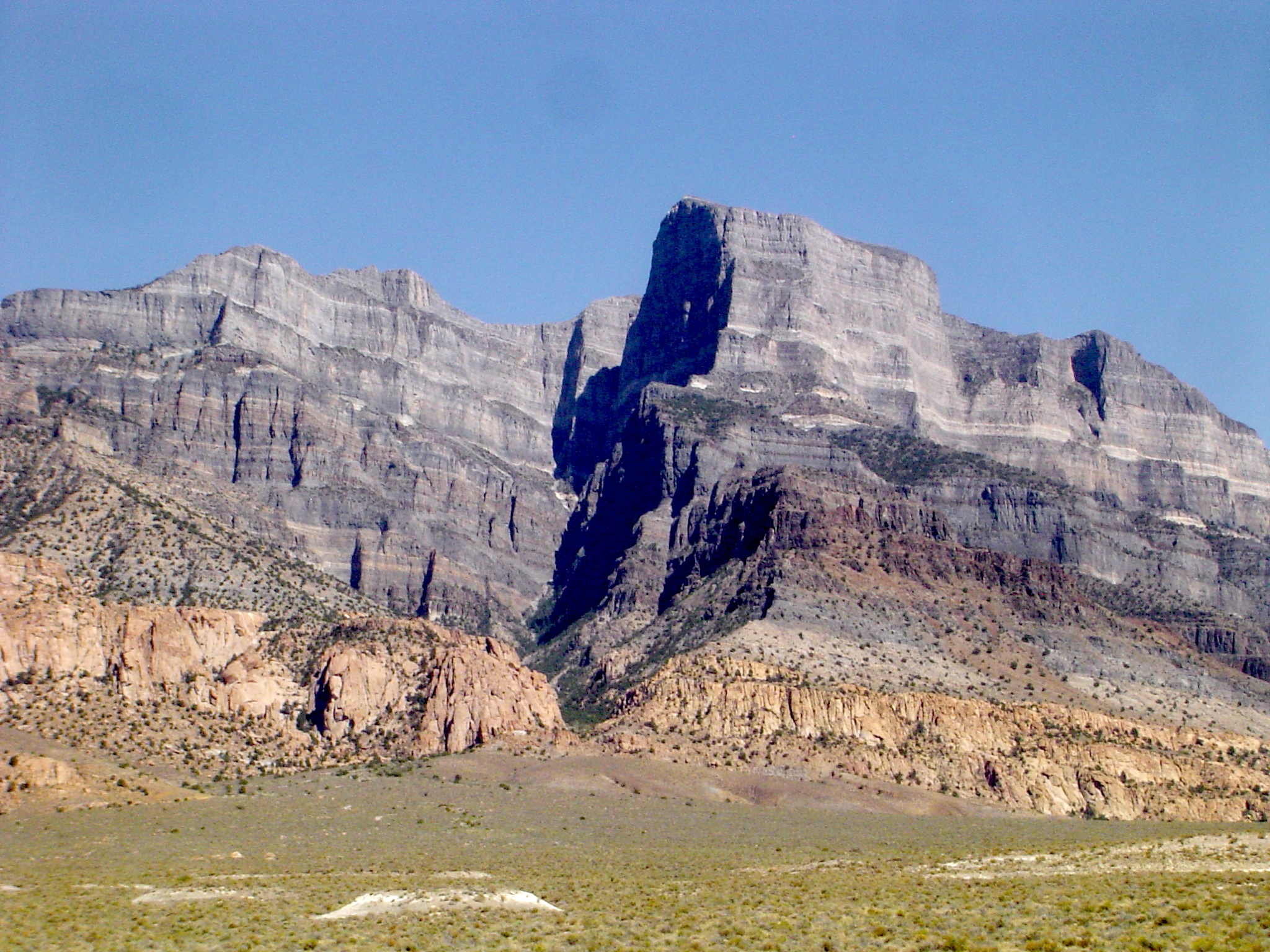
A Jurassic pluton of pink monzonite intruded below a section of gray sedimentary rocks which was subsequently uplifted and exposed, near Notch Peak, House Range, Utah.

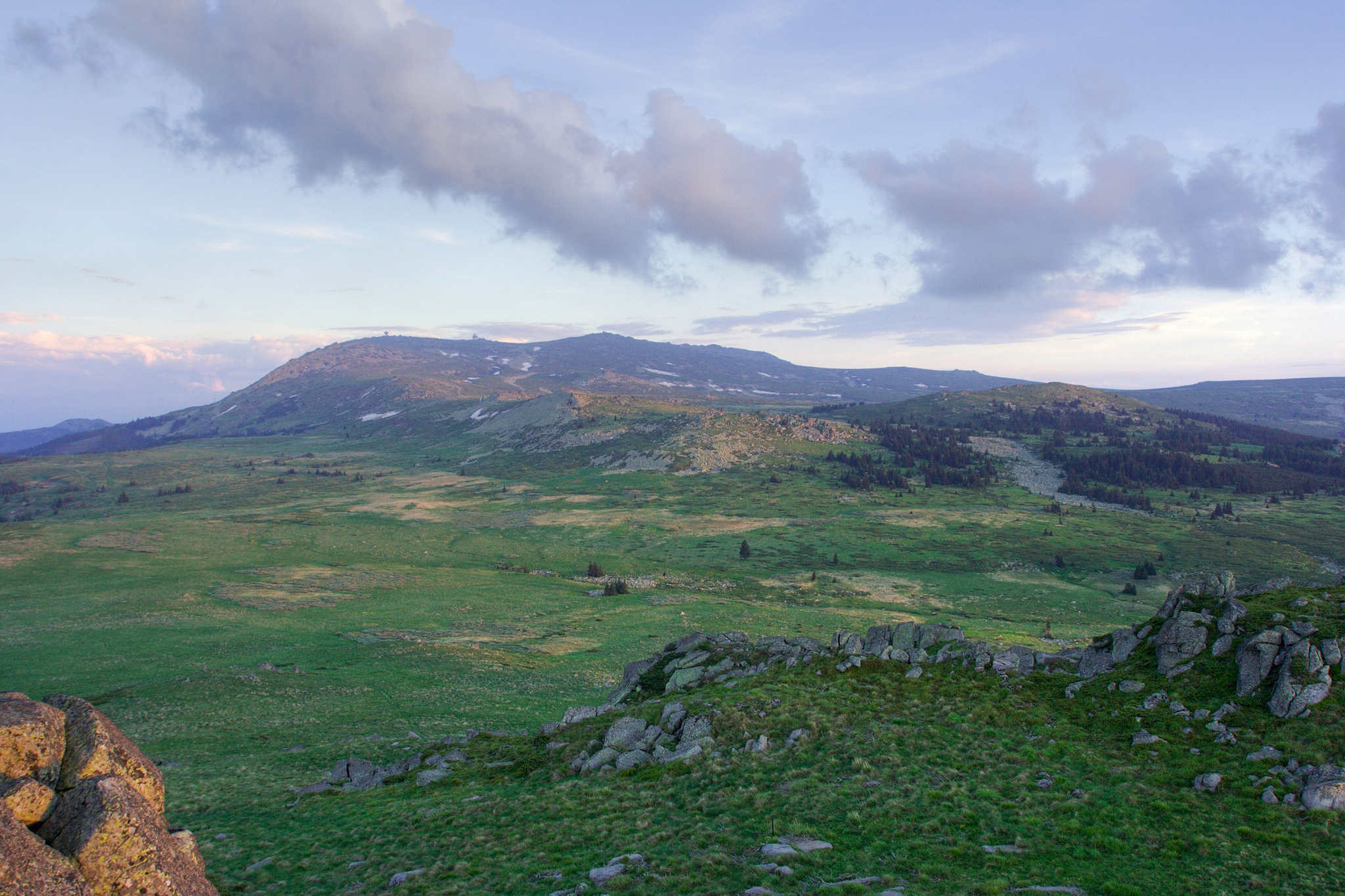
The exposed laccolith atop a massive pluton system near Sofia, formed by the Vitosha syenite and Plana diorite domed mountains and later uplifted

In geology, an igneous intrusion (or intrusive body or simply intrusion) is a body of intrusive igneous rock that forms by crystallization of magma slowly cooling below the surface of the Earth. Intrusions have a wide variety of forms and compositions, illustrated by examples like the Palisades Sill of New York and New Jersey; the Henry Mountains of Utah; the Bushveld Igneous Complex of South Africa; Shiprock in New Mexico; the Ardnamurchan intrusion in Scotland; and the Sierra Nevada Batholith of California.

Because the solid country rock into which magma intrudes is an excellent insulator, cooling of the magma is extremely slow, and intrusive igneous rock is coarse-grained (phaneritic). Intrusive igneous rocks are classified separately from extrusive igneous rocks, generally on the basis of their mineral content. The relative amounts of quartz, alkali feldspar, plagioclase, and feldspathoid is particularly important in classifying intrusive igneous rocks.

Intrusions must displace existing country rock to make room for themselves. The question of how this takes place is called the room problem, and it remains a subject of active investigation for many kinds of intrusions.

The term pluton is poorly defined, but has been used to describe an intrusion emplaced at great depth; as a synonym for all igneous intrusions; as a dustbin category for intrusions whose size or character are not well determined; or as a name for a very large intrusion or for a crystallized magma chamber. A pluton that has intruded and obscured the contact between a terrane and adjacent rock is called a stitching pluton.

== Classification ==
Basic types of intrusions: 1. Laccolith, 2. Small dike, 3. Batholith, 4. Dike, 5. Sill, 6. Volcanic neck, pipe, 7. Lopolith.

Intrusions are broadly divided into discordant intrusions, which cut across the existing structure of the country rock, and concordant intrusions that intrude parallel to existing bedding or fabric. These are further classified according to such criteria as size, evident mode of origin, or whether they are tabular in shape.

An intrusive suite is a group of intrusions related in time and space.

=== Discordant intrusions ===
==== Dikes ====
Dikes are tabular discordant intrusions, taking the form of sheets that cut across existing rock beds. They tend to resist erosion, so that they stand out as natural walls on the landscape. They vary in thickness from millimeter-thick films to over 300 meters (980 ft) and an individual sheet can have an area of 12,000 square kilometers (4,600 sq mi). They also vary widely in composition. Dikes form by hydraulic fracturing of the country rock by magma under pressure, and are more common in regions of crustal tension.

===== Ring dikes and cone sheets =====
Ring dikes and cone sheets are dikes with particular forms that are associated with the formation of calderas.

==== Volcanic necks ====
Volcanic necks are feeder pipes for volcanoes that have been exposed by erosion. Surface exposures are typically cylindrical, but the intrusion often becomes elliptical or even cloverleaf-shaped at depth. Dikes often radiate from a volcanic neck, suggesting that necks tend to form at intersections of dikes where passage of magma is least obstructed.

==== Diatremes and breccia pipes ====
Diatremes and breccia pipes are pipe-like bodies of breccia that are formed by particular kinds of explosive eruptions. As they have reached the surface they are really extrusions, but the non erupted material is an intrusion and indeed due to erosion may be difficult to distinguish from an intrusion that never reached the surface when magma/lava. The root material of a diatreme is identical to intrusive material nearby, if it exists, that never reached the then surface when formed.

==== Stocks ====
A stock is a non-tabular discordant intrusion whose exposure covers less than 100 square kilometers (39 sq mi). Although this seems arbitrary, particularly since the exposure may be only the tip of a larger intrusive body, the classification is meaningful for bodies which do not change much in area with depth and that have other features suggesting a distinctive origin and mode of emplacement.

==== Batholiths ====
Batholiths are discordant intrusions with an exposed area greater than 100 square kilometers (39 sq mi). Some are of truly enormous size, and their lower contacts are very rarely exposed. For example, the Coastal Batholith of Peru is 1,100 kilometers (680 mi) long and 50 kilometers (31 mi) wide. They are usually formed from magma rich in silica, and never from gabbro or other rock rich in mafic minerals, but some batholiths are composed almost entirely of anorthosite.

=== Concordant intrusions ===
==== Sills ====
A sill is a tabular concordant intrusion, typically taking the form of a sheet parallel to sedimentary beds. They are otherwise similar to dikes. Most are of mafic composition, relatively low in silica, which gives them the low viscosity necessary to penetrate between sedimentary beds.

==== Laccoliths ====
A laccolith is a concordant intrusion with a flat base and domed roof. Laccoliths typically form at shallow depth, less than 3 kilometers (1.9 mi), and in regions of crustal compression.

==== Lopoliths and layered intrusions ====
Lopoliths are concordant intrusions with a saucer shape, somewhat resembling an inverted laccolith, but they can be much larger and form by different processes. Their immense size promotes very slow cooling, and this produces an unusually complete mineral segregation called a layered intrusion.

== Formation ==
=== The room problem ===
The ultimate source of magma is partial melting of rock in the upper mantle and lower crust. This produces magma that is less dense than its source rock. For example, a granitic magma, which is high in silica, has a density of 2.4 Mg/m^{3}, much less than the 2.8 Mg/m^{3} of high-grade metamorphic rock. This gives the magma tremendous buoyancy, so that ascent of the magma is inevitable once enough magma has accumulated. However, the question of precisely how large quantities of magma are able to shove aside country rock to make room for themselves (the room problem) is still a matter of research.

The composition of the magma and country rock and the stresses affecting the country rock strongly influence the kinds of intrusions that take place. For example, where the crust is undergoing extension, magma can easily rise into tensional fractures in the upper crust to form dikes. Where the crust is under compression, magma at shallow depth will tend to form laccoliths instead, with the magma penetrating the least competent beds, such as shale beds. Ring dikes and cone sheets form only at shallow depth, where a plug of overlying country rock can be raised or lowered. The immense volumes of magma involved in batholiths can force their way upwards only when the magma is highly silicic and buoyant, and likely do so as diapirs in the ductile deep crust and through a variety of other mechanisms in the brittle upper crust.

=== Multiple and composite intrusions ===
Igneous intrusions may form from a single magmatic event or several incremental events. Recent evidence suggests that incremental formation is more common for large intrusions. For example, the Palisades Sill was never a single body of magma 300 meters (980 ft) thick, but was formed from multiple injections of magma. An intrusive body is described as multiple when it forms from repeated injections of magma of similar composition, and as composite when formed of repeated injections of magma of unlike composition. A composite dike can include rocks as different as granophyre and diabase.

While there is often little visual evidence of multiple injections in the field, there is geochemical evidence. Zircon zoning provides important evidence for determining if a single magmatic event or a series of injections were the methods of emplacement.

Large felsic intrusions likely form from melting of lower crust that has been heated by an intrusion of mafic magma from the upper mantle. The different densities of felsic and mafic magma limit mixing, so that the silicic magma floats on the mafic magma. Such limited mixing as takes place results in the small inclusions of mafic rock commonly found in granites and granodiorites.

=== Cooling ===
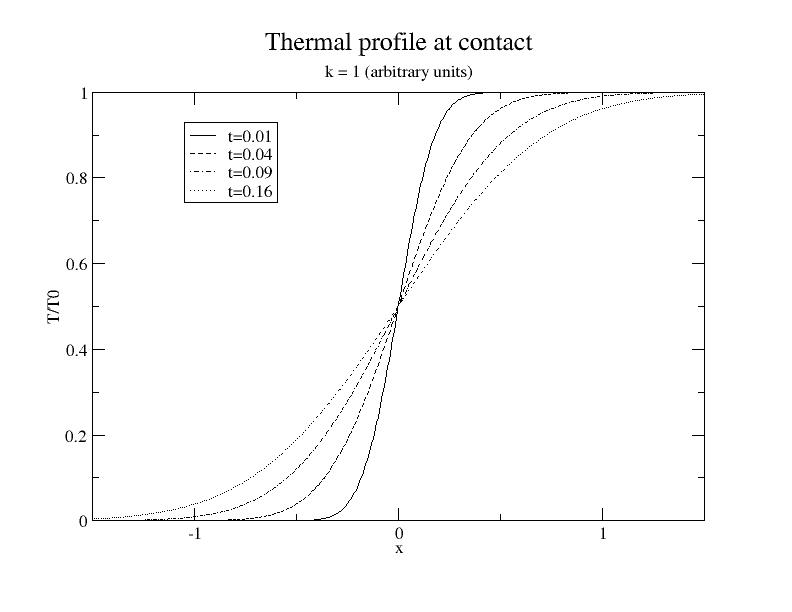
Thermal profiles at different times after intrusion, illustrating square root law

An intrusion of magma loses heat to the surrounding country rock through heat conduction. Near the contact of hot material with cold material, if the hot material is initially uniform in temperature, the temperature profile across the contact is given by the relationship

$$T/T_0 = \frac{1}{2} + \frac{1}{2} \operatorname{erf}(\frac{x}{2\sqrt{kt}})$$

where $T_0$ is the initial temperature of the hot material, k is the thermal diffusivity (typically close to 10^{−6} m^{2} s^{−1} for most geologic materials), x is the distance from the contact, and t is the time since intrusion. This formula suggests that the magma close to the contact will be rapidly chilled while the country rock close to the contact is rapidly heated, while material further from the contact will be much slower to cool or heat. Thus a chilled margin is often found on the intrusion side of the contact, while a contact aureole is found on the country rock side. The chilled margin is much finer grained than most of the intrusion, and may be different in composition, reflecting the initial composition of the intrusion before fractional crystallization, assimilation of country rock, or further magmatic injections modified the composition of the rest of the intrusion. Isotherms (surfaces of constant temperature) propagate away from the margin according to a square root law, so that if the outermost meter of the magma takes ten years to cool to a given temperature, the next inward meter will take 40 years, the next will take 90 years, and so on.

This is an idealization, and such processes as magma convection (where cooled magma next to the contact sinks to the bottom of the magma chamber and hotter magma takes its place) can alter the cooling process, reducing the thickness of chilled margins while hastening cooling of the intrusion as a whole. However, it is clear that thin dikes will cool much faster than larger intrusions, which explains why small intrusions near the surface (where the country rock is initially cold) are often nearly as fine-grained as volcanic rock.

Structural features of the contact between intrusion and country rock give clues to the conditions under which the intrusion took place. Catazonal intrusions have a thick aureole that grades into the intrusive body with no sharp margin, indicating considerable chemical reaction between intrusion and country rock, and often have broad migmatite zones. Foliations in the intrusion and the surrounding country rock are roughly parallel, with indications of extreme deformation in the country rock. Such intrusions are interpreted as taking placed at great depth. Mesozonal intrusions have a much lower degree of metamorphism in their contact aureoles, and the contact between country rock and intrusion is clearly discernible. Migmatites are rare and deformation of country rock is moderate. Such intrusions are interpreted as occurring at medium depth. Epizonal intrusions are discordant with country rock and have sharp contacts with chilled margins, with only limited metamorphism in a contact aureole, and often contain xenolithic fragments of country rock suggesting brittle fracturing. Such intrusions are interpreted as occurring at shallow depth, and are commonly associated with volcanic rocks and collapse structures.

==== Cumulates ====
An intrusion does not crystallize all minerals at once; rather, there is a sequence of crystallization that is reflected in the Bowen reaction series. Crystals formed early in cooling are generally denser than the remaining magma and can settle to the bottom of a large intrusive body. This forms a cumulate layer with distinctive texture and composition. Such cumulate layers may contain valuable ore deposits of chromite. The vast Bushveld Igneous Complex of South Africa includes cumulate layers of the rare rock type, chromitite, composed of 90% chromite.

== See also ==
- Plutonism – Geological theory that Earth's igneous rocks formed by solidification of molten material
- Salt dome – Structural dome formed of salt or halite
- Salt tectonics – Geology of salt structures
