= David Aitken =

David Aitken may refer to:

- David D. Aitken (1853–1930), U.S. Representative from Michigan
- David Aitken (minister) (1796–1875), Scottish minister and church historian
