= George Middlemore =

British Army general

Lieutenant-General George Middlemore CB

Governor of Saint Helena
- In office 1836 – 6 January 1842
- Preceded by: Charles Dallas
- Succeeded by: Hamelin Trelawny

Lieutenant Governor of Grenada
- In office 1833–1835
- Preceded by: James Campbell
- Succeeded by: John Hastings Mair

Personal details
- Died: 18 November 1850 Royal Tunbridge Wells, England
- Spouse: Phillis Sophia Lobb
- Children: Six, including Lieutenant-Colonel R. F. Middlemore
- Awards: Companion of the Order of the Bath

Military service
- Allegiance: United Kingdom
- Branch/service: British Army
- Years of service: 1793–1850
- Rank: Lieutenant-General
- Commands: 48th Regiment of Foot; Inspecting Field Officer, Nottingham
- Battles/wars: French Revolutionary War; Egypt Campaign; Fourth Anglo-Mysore War; Napoleonic Wars; Peninsular War; Battle of Talavera

Lieutenant-General George Middlemore CB (died 18 November 1850, Tunbridge Wells) was a British Army officer and the first Governor of Saint Helena.

Originally commissioned in the 86th Regiment of Foot, he rose to command the 48th Regiment of Foot during the Peninsular War. He was the lieutenant-governor of Grenada from 1833 to 1835.

Middlemore was the first governor of Saint Helena from 1836 to 1842 after its handover from the British East India Company to the Crown. He oversaw the repatriation of Napoleon's remains from there in 1840. He was succeeded on 6 January 1842 by Colonel Hamelin Trelawny.

== Personal life ==
Middlemore married Phillis Sophia Lobb (died 15 July 1854, Southborough). They had 6 children:

1. Grace Phyllis (died 1892)
2. Robert Frederick Middlemore (died 18 October 1896, Thorngrove)
3. Helen Catherine
4. Jemina Honor (died 1887)
5. Mary Douglas (died 18 August 1853, Hastings)
6. Catherine Sophia

Political offices
| Preceded by Charles Dallas | Governor of Saint Helena; 1836–1842 | Succeeded by Hamelin Trelawny |
Military offices
| Preceded by Sir Peregrine Maitland | Colonel of the 76th Regiment of Foot; 1843 | Succeeded by Sir Robert Arbuthnot |
| Preceded by Sir Thomas Hislop | Colonel of the 48th Regiment of Foot; 1843–1850 | Succeeded by Sir James Reynett |
