= Governor Dallas =

- Alexander Grant Dallas (1816–1882), British governor of Rupert's Land from 1862 to 1864
- Charles Dallas (1767–1855), Governor of St. Helena from 1828 to 1834
