= Kirk Duncanson =

Scottish surgeon and botanist

Dr John Janet Kirk Duncanson (usually referred to as J J Kirk Duncanson) (1846–1913) was a Scottish surgeon and botanist, running the Ear, Nose and Throat section of the Edinburgh Royal Infirmary. The Kirk Duncanson Fellowship for Medical Research is named in his honour. Some documents give his name as John James Kirk Duncanson, but John Janet better explains his use of J J and appears on most official documents. He was a noted amateur botanist which led to his being made a Fellow of the Royal Society of Edinburgh.

== Life ==
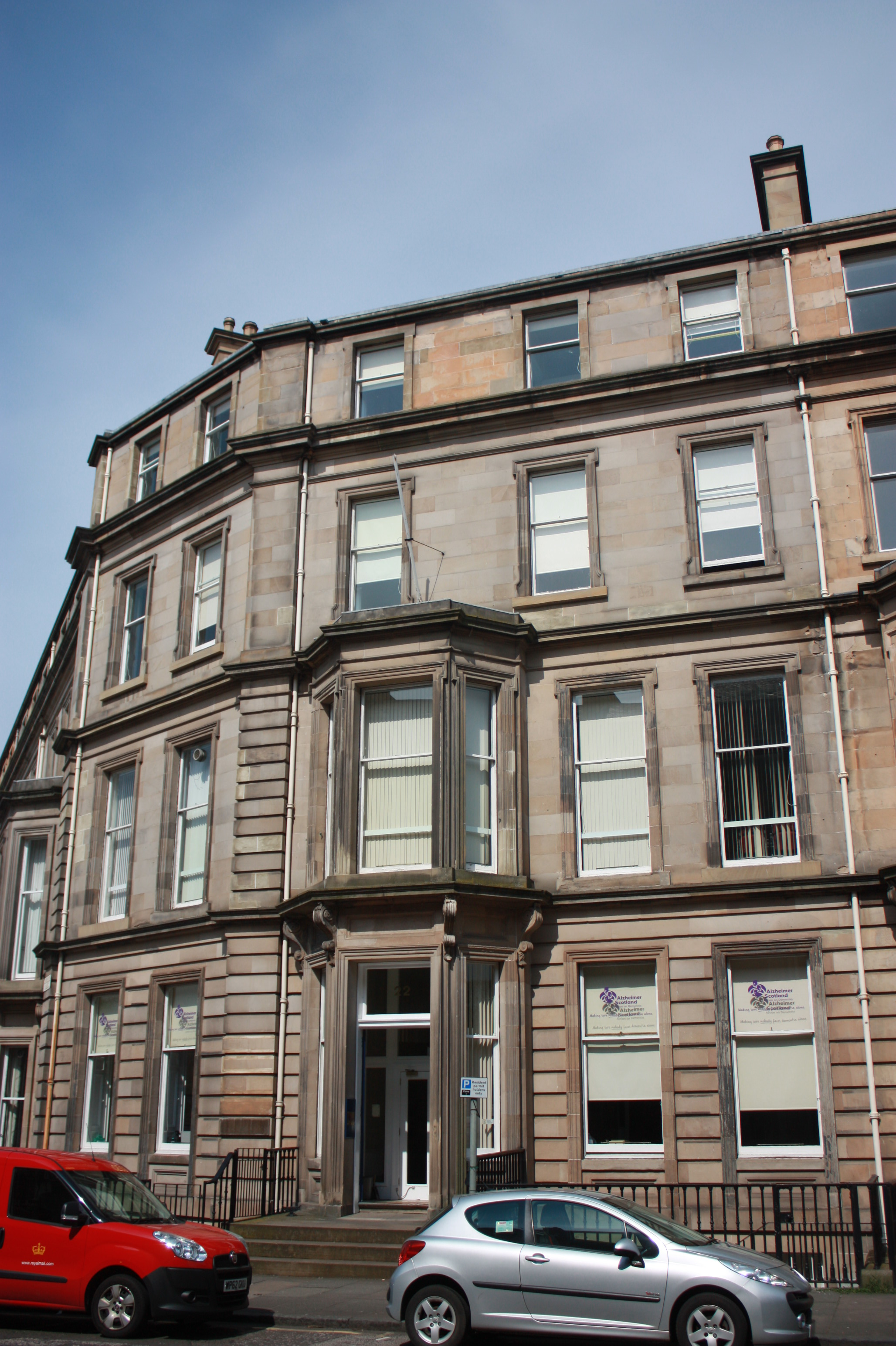
Duncanson's huge townhouse at 22 Drumsheugh Gardens, Edinburgh

Duncanson was born around 1846 near Dunfermline, the son of Thomas Duncanson (born 1809) and his wife, Euphemia Faulds. He had two sisters: Helen Frances and Mary. His sister Mary Duncanson married a botanist, Professor Saddler, possibly meeting Saddler through her brother's botanical interests.

Duncanson was educated at Dollar Academy and then the Edinburgh Institution (now known as Stewart's Melville College), originally training to be an engineer. But influenced by his close friend David Ferrier, he instead decided to follow Medicine. His lecturers at Edinburgh University included Sir William Turner. Duncanson graduated in 1868. On graduating, again at Ferrier's encouragement, he went to Heidelberg for further studies, and from there to Vienna, where he began to specialise in the ear. He returned to Edinburgh and gained his doctorate (MD) in 1871, becoming a Fellow of the Royal College of Physicians of Edinburgh in 1874.

Duncanson began working at Edinburgh Royal Infirmary and both Benjamin Bell and his son Joseph Bell, becoming Principal Surgeon in the Ear Nose and Throat Department (then on Cambridge Street).

In 1873, Duncanson was elected a member of the Harveian Society of Edinburgh and served as president in 1902. In 1878 he was elected a Fellow of the Royal Society of Edinburgh. His proposers were Sir William Turner, Sir Robert Christison, Sir Thomas Richard Fraser, and William Rutherford. His fellowship appears based on his botanical presentations. In May 1878 he was appointed Acting Surgeon to the 1st Edinburgh Artillery Volunteer Corps.

In 1880, Duncanson was living at 8 Torphicen Street in Edinburgh's West End. From 1885 he was living at 22 Drumsheugh Gardens, next door to Dr Byrom Bramwell.

Ill-health forced Duncanson into early retirement. He chose Gullane for this as he was a keen golfer. He died at Gullane on 12 March 1913.

== Family ==
Duncanson married Isabella Baird (b. Airdrie 1853) in 1875. They had no children.
