= Charlotte Square =

Garden square in Edinburgh, Scotland

Coordinates: 55.951776°N 3.207657°W

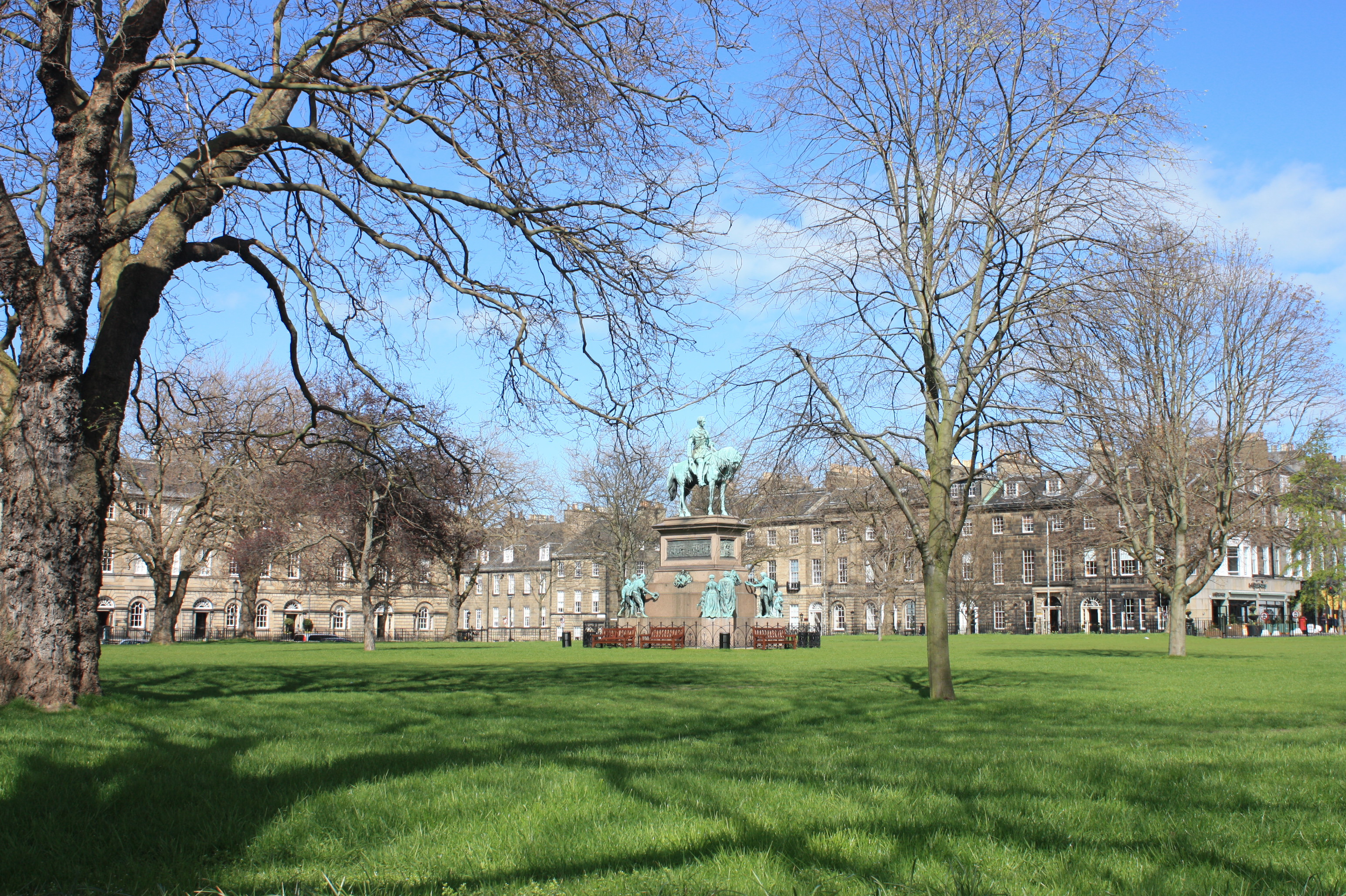
Charlotte Square from the southwest

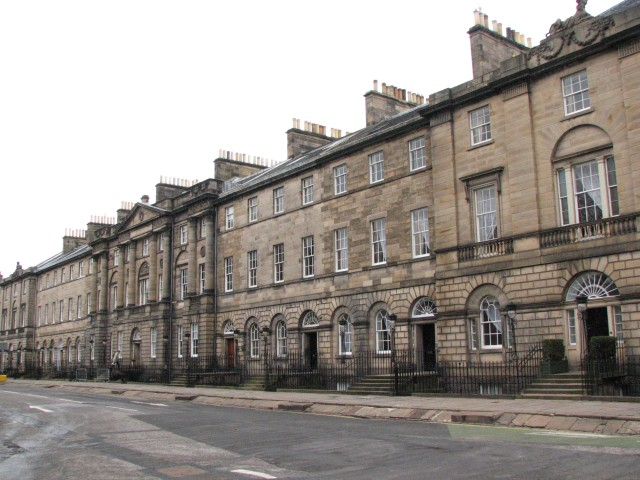
Robert Adam's palace-fronted north side

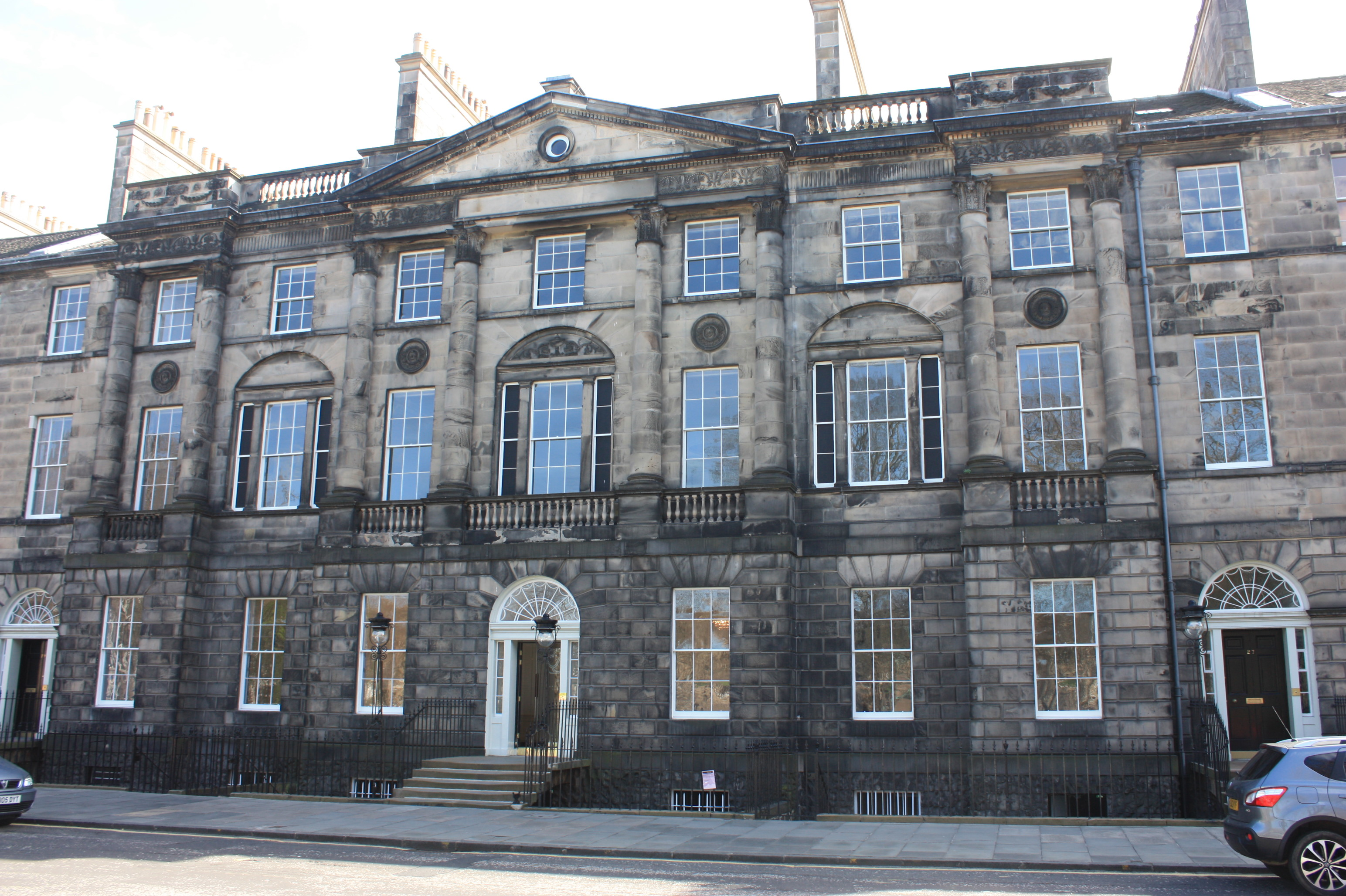
The central pavilion on the south side

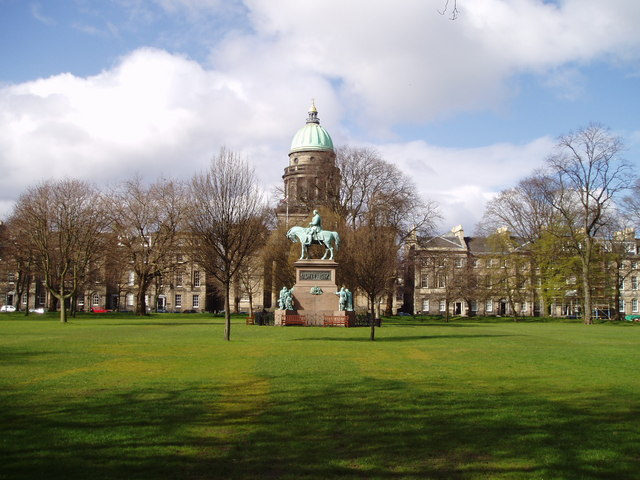
A statue of Prince Albert stands in the centre of Charlotte Square, in front of West Register House

Charlotte Square is a garden square in Edinburgh, Scotland, part of the New Town, designated a UNESCO World Heritage Site. The square is located at the west end of George Street and was intended to mirror St. Andrew Square in the east. The gardens, one of the collection of New Town Gardens, are private and not publicly accessible.

== History ==
Initially named St. George's Square in James Craig's original plan, it was renamed in 1786 after King George III's Queen and first daughter, to avoid confusion with George Square to the south of the Old Town. Charlotte Square was the last part of the initial phase of the New Town to be "completed" in 1820 (note- the north-west section at Glenfinlas Street was not completed until 1990 due to a long-running boundary dispute). Much of it was to the 1791 design of Robert Adam, who died in 1792, just as building began.

In 1939 a very sizable air-raid shelter was created under the south side of the gardens, accessed from the street to the south.

In 2013 the south side was redeveloped in an award-winning scheme by Paul Quinn, creating major new office floorspace behind a restored series of townhouses.

Edinburgh Collegiate School was located in Charlotte Square.

== Gardens ==
The garden was originally laid out as a level circular form by William Weir in 1808.

In 1861 a plan was drawn up by Robert Matheson, Clerk of Works for Scotland for a larger, more square garden, centred upon a memorial to the recently deceased Prince Albert, the consort of Queen Victoria.

The commission for the sculpture was granted in 1865 to Sir John Steell. The main statue features an equestrian statue of the prince, in field marshal's uniform, dwarfing the four figures around the base. It was unveiled by Queen Victoria herself in 1876. The stone plinth was designed by the architect David Bryce and the four corner figures are by David Watson Stevenson (Science and Learning/Labour), George Clark Stanton (Army and Navy) and William Brodie (Nobility). The statue was originally intended to go in the centre of the eastern edge of the garden, facing down George Street.

This remodelling featured major new tree-planting which took many years to re-establish.

The central open space is a private garden, available to owners of the surrounding properties. For many years in the last three weeks in August each year Charlotte Square gardens was the site of the Edinburgh International Book Festival. They have since moved across town to the Edinburgh Futures Institute.

The railings around the gardens were removed in 1940 as part of the war effort. The current railings date from 1947. Changes to street levels, contours and surfacing to accommodate modern traffic caused controversy in the late 1950s and early '60s.

== Buildings ==
On the north side, No. 5 was the home of John Crichton-Stuart, 4th Marquess of Bute (1881–1947), who bought it in 1903 and gave it to the National Trust for Scotland on his death. It was the Trust headquarters from 1949 to 2000. Bute did much to promote the preservation of the square.

Bute House, the official residence of the First Minister of Scotland

Nos. 6 and 7 are also owned by the National Trust for Scotland. No.6, Bute House is the official residence of the First Minister of Scotland. In 1806 it was home to Sir John Sinclair creator of the first Statistical Account of Scotland. No. 7 was internally restored by the Trust in 1975 to its original state, and is open to the public as The Georgian House. The upper floor was formerly the official residence of the Moderator of the General Assembly of the Church of Scotland. The building includes one fireplace brought from Hill of Tarvit in Fife in 1975.

West Register House, formerly St. George's Church, forms the centre of the west side. It was designed by the architect Robert Reid in 1811, broadly to Adam's plan. The church opened in 1814 and was converted to its current use in 1964. It is one of the main buildings of the National Records of Scotland.

== Residents ==
From the very inception of Charlotte Square in 1791, it was anticipated it would be one of the top addresses in Edinburgh. As the Victorian era commenced, the square was increasingly occupied by the elite of the middle class: legal and medical professionals. This is reflected in the notable residents listed below. As the 20th century began most buildings were still occupied as residential addresses, although more are offices, solely occupied by guardians.

Side	Number	Resident
North	4	Sir Alexander Hugh Freeland Barbour lived at no.4 (previously occupied by Rev Dr David Aitken FRSE)
North	4	"Rev Dr David Aitken" FRSE
North	5	Sir James Fergusson, 4th baronet (1765-1838) lived at no.5
North	5	Robert Nasmyth FRSE, dentist to Queen Victoria (1792-1870)
North	6 Bute House, Official Residence of the First Minister of Scotland	Sir Mitchell Mitchell-Thomson, 1st Baronet
North	6 Bute House, Official Residence of the First Minister of Scotland	Sir John Sinclair, 1st Baronet
North	6 Bute House, Official Residence of the First Minister of Scotland	Catherine Sinclair, novelist
North	7, The Georgian House	Charles Neaves, Lord Neaves
North	7, The Georgian House	Rev Alexander Whyte, Minister of St. George's West Free Church in Shandwick Place was resident in 1901
North	8	Thomas R Ronaldson, General Practitioner, was resident in 1901, together with his son Thomas Martine Ronaldson, artist
North	9	Patrick Robertson, Lord Robertson
North	9	James Syme, Surgeon
North	9	Joseph Lister, Son-in-law of James Syme
North	9	Sir Douglas Archibald Seton-Steuart, 5th and final Seton-Steuart baronet was resident in 1901
North	10	James Begbie, Surgeon
North	11	Æneas MacBean WS
West	12	James Joseph Hope-Vere Member of Parliament for Linlithgowshire, 1743-68
West	12	James Morton Robertson wine Merchant was resident in 1901
West	13	Sir William Fettes, Scottish Businessman whose bequest led to the foundation of Fettes College
West	13	George Hunter MacThomas Thoms, Advocate, Sheriff, eccentric, and posthumous benefactor of St Magnus Cathedral.
West	13	Francis Mitchell Caird, President of the Royal College of Surgeons, Edinburgh
West	14	Lord Cockburn, Whig lawyer, historian and conservationist and afterwards Georbge Moir
West	15	Charles Alfred Cooper, editor of The Scotsman
West	16	Patrick Heron Watson, surgeon and pioneer of anaesthetic development and modern dentistry was resident in 1901
West	17	Viscount Haldane was born at No.17.
West	17	James Wolfe Murray, Lord Cringletie in the 1830s
West	19	Lord Torphichen
West	19	Thomas Grainger Stewart, president of the Royal College of Physicians. His widow was present in 1901.
West	20	Prof John Batty Tuke then John Clarence Webster
West	22	James Ritchie
South	24	The birthplace of Field Marshal Earl Haig
South	25	Adam Duff, Sheriff of Midlothian
South	25	Sir John Halliday Croom FRSE
South	26	Prof John Chiene, Professor of Surgery at Edinburgh University
South	27	Sir Alexander Gibson-Maitland of Cliftonhall
South	28	David Boyle, Lord Boyle
South	29	Dr David Berry Hart
South	30	Dr James Matthews Duncan then Prof William Rutherford Sanders
South	31	William Adam of Blair Adam then Thomas Annandale
East	33	Sir Alexander C Gibson-Maitland of Clifton Hall
East	34	Archibald Campbell Swinton Professor of Civil Law at Edinburgh University and his son Alan Archibald Campbell-Swinton television pioneer
East	35	William Allan Jamieson President of the Royal College of Physicians of Edinburgh lived and died at 35
East	38	Sir William Cunningham Dalyell, an officer in the British Royal Navy who served in the French Revolutionary Wars lived at 38 in the 1830s It was then purchased by John Learmonth.
East	40	Home of the Juridical Society
East	44	Robert Reid redesigned no.44 internally, as his own home.
East	45	Sir Robert William Philip, pioneer in the treatment of tuberculosis was resident from 1898 until his death in 1938, but absent in 1901. Prior to this it had been the home of Dr James Macadam Hare FRSE HEICS

Pioneer of the telephone, Alexander Graham Bell, was born in nearby South Charlotte Street.
