= Charles Alfred Cooper =

English newspaper editor and author

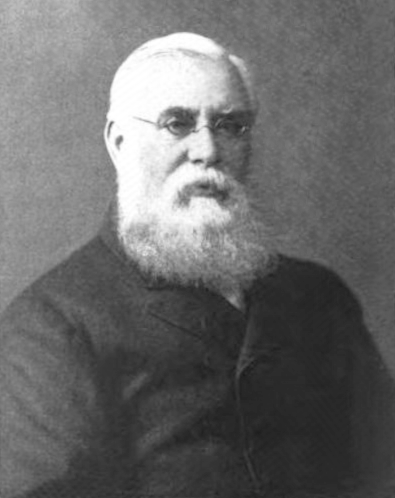
- In The Sketch, 9 January 1901
- Born: 16 September 1829; Hull, England
- Died: 14 April 1916 (aged 86); Bournemouth, England
- Burial place: Dean Cemetery
- Occupation(s): Journalist, writer
- Spouse: Susannah Towers (m. 1852; died 1887)

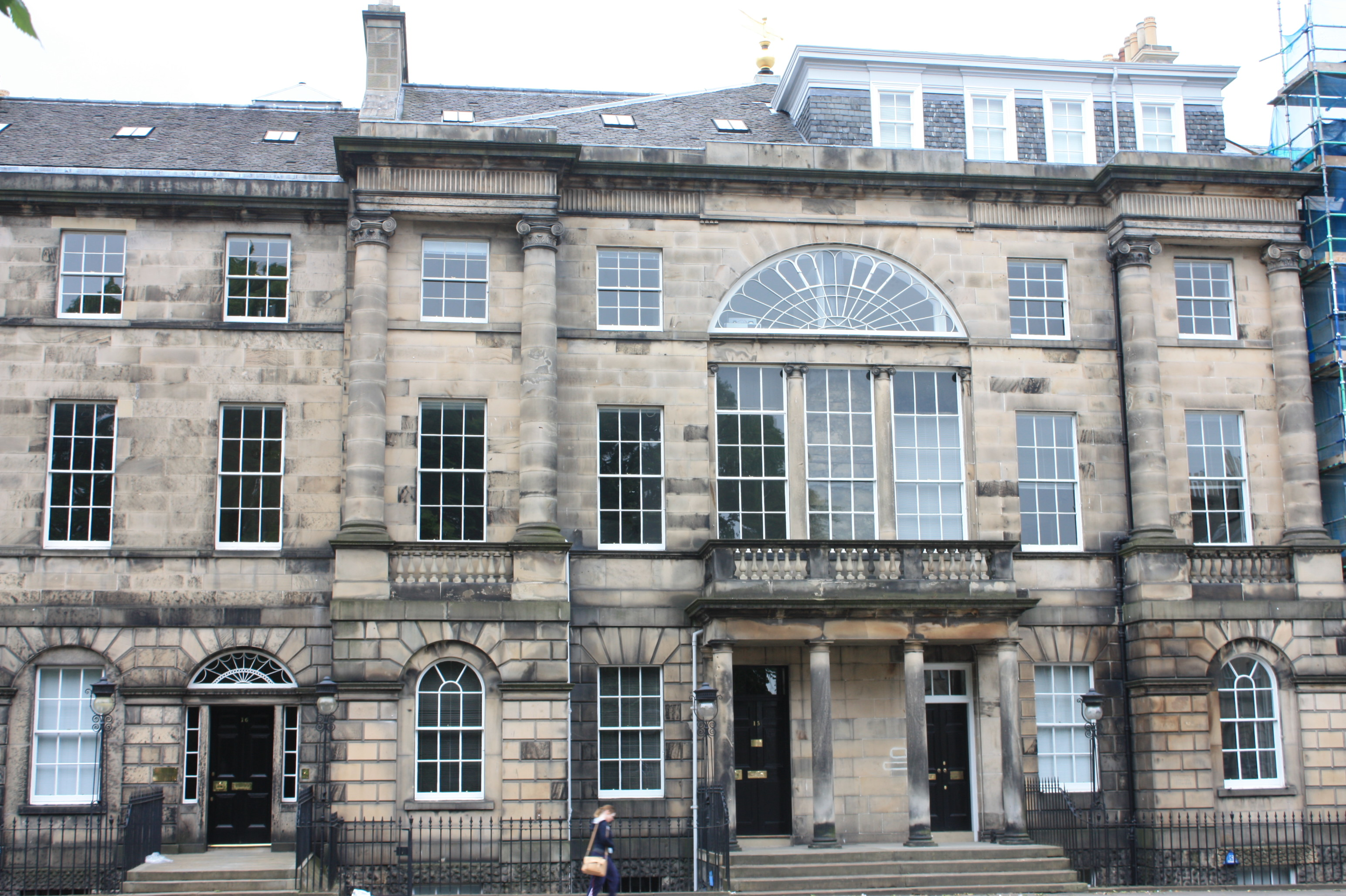
Cooper's large townhouse at 15 Charlotte Square, Edinburgh (centre)

Charles Alfred Cooper FRSE LLD (16 September 1829 – 14 April 1916) was an English newspaper editor and author. In 1894 he co-founded the Edinburgh Sir Walter Scott Club.

== Life ==
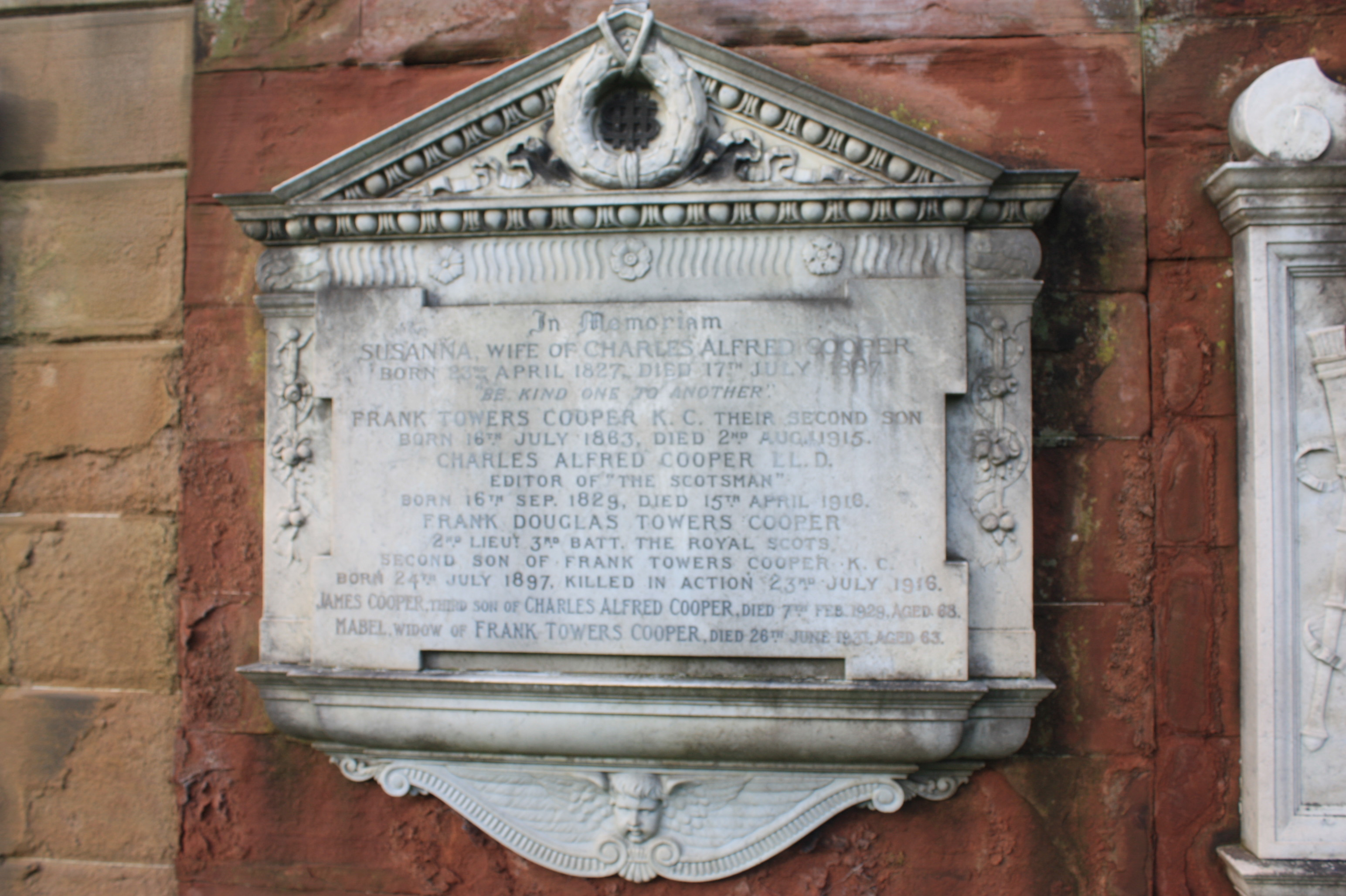
The grave of Charles Alfred Cooper, Dean Cemetery

He was born in Hull on 16 September 1829, the son of Charles Cooper, an architect in Hull. He attended Hull Grammar School.

Initially working as a journalist for the Hull Advertiser he rose to be its Sub-editor and Manager. In 1861, he became a political correspondent working at the House of Commons for the Morning Star. In 1868, he resigned his position to become Assistant Editor to Alexander Russel in The Scotsman newspaper in Edinburgh. When Russel died in 1876, the editorship was taken by Rev Dr Robert Wallace and on his retiral in 1880 Cooper was placed as editor. He served as editor for 25 years, until retiring in 1906 (aged 76) to be replaced by John Pettigrew Croal.

During his period as editor he lived at 15 Charlotte Square, one of Edinburgh's most prestigious addresses.

In 1890, he was elected a Fellow of the Royal Society of Edinburgh his proposers including Alexander Crum Brown, Sir Arthur Mitchell and John McLaren, Lord McLaren. The University of Edinburgh awarded him a Doctor of Letters (LLD) in 1907.

He died in Bournemouth on 14 April 1916.

He is buried in Dean Cemetery in western Edinburgh with his wife Susanna, who had died in 1887, and two of their sons: Frank Towers Cooper KC (1883–1915) and James Cooper (1866–1929). The grave lies on the north wall of the first north extension.

== Publications ==
- Letters on Egypt (1891)
- Letters on South Africa (1895)
- An Editor's Retrospect (1896) (an autobiography)

== Family ==
In 1852, he married Susannah Towers, who died in 1887.

Their son F T Cooper KC died in 1915.
