= John Crighton Bramwell =

British cardiologist and professor of medicine

J. Crighton Bramwell
- Bramwell in 1949
- Born: 4 March 1889; Edinburgh
- Died: 8 September 1976 (aged 87) near Ambleside
- Education: Trinity College, Cambridge
- Occupation: Cardiologist
- Spouse: Elsa Violet Risk (married 1929)
- Children: 3
- Parents: Sir Byrom Bramwell; Martha Crighton
- Relatives: Edwin Bramwell (brother)
- Honours: FRCPE FRCP

John Crighton Bramwell FRCP FRCPE (1889–1976) was a British cardiologist, professor of medicine, and one of the founders of cardiology as a specialist subject in the UK.

== Education and career ==
Born on 4 March 1889 in Edinburgh, to Sir Byrom Bramwell and Martha Crighton, he was educated at Cheltenham College, before matriculated in 1907 at Trinity College, Cambridge. There he was influenced by the physiologist Keith Lucas. In 1911 Bramwell started clinical medical training at the Manchester Royal Infirmary. At the start of WWI he joined the 1st East Lancashire Territorial Field Ambulance in Egypt. In 1915 he was granted leave for two months to take his final examination at the University of Manchester, where he graduated MB CHB. After his return to active duty, he was posted to the 23rd Division, 12th Army Corps in France and then in Italy as part of the Italian Expeditionary Force. He served first with a Field Ambulance and later as Deputy Assistant Director of Medical Services (DADMS) to GHQ, Italy.

At the Manchester Royal Infirmary, Bramwell became in 1919 a house physician under G. R. Murray and a medical and cardiographic registrar. At the University of Manchester in 1920 Bramwell was put in charge of the newly established electrocardiographic department. At the University of Manchester's department of physiology from 1919 to 1923 Bramwell collaborated with Archibald Hill on several papers on pulse wave velocity and arterial elasticity and taught clinical medicine.

In 1923, Bramwell graduated MD from the University of Manchester and was elected one of the first four Rockefeller Travelling Fellows of the Medical Research Council. From 1923 to 1925 he studied at Washington University in St. Louis and the Rockefeller Institute of Medical Research in Manhattan and also visited about 18 of the leading medical schools in the United States and Canada.

He was appointed an assistant lecturer in experimental physiology at the University of Manchester in 1925. He was appointed in 1926 a physician at the Manchester Royal Infirmary and later entered consulting practice as a cardiologist. Bramwell was a member of the Manchester Literary and Philosophical Society

From 1940 to 1946, he was part-time Professor of Systematic Medicine in the University of Manchester. In 1946 he resigned that professorship so that Robert Platt could become full-time professor of medicine. From 1946 to 1954 Bramwell was professor of cardiology and then retired as professor emeritus.

He was elected Fellow of the Royal College of Physicians in 1929 and honorary Fellow of the Royal College of Physicians of Edinburgh (of which both his father and brother were Presidents) in 1960. He gave in 1937 the Lumleian Lectures on Arterial pulse in health and disease and in 1956 the Harveian Oration on Practice, teaching and research. For many years he was an editor for the Quarterly Journal of Medicine. He was in 1955–1956 the president of the Association of Physicians and the president of the British Cardiac Society. He was for many years a member of the editorial board of the British Heart Journal, which in 1956 dedicated a special issue to him. In that issue, J. Maurice Campbell wrote an appreciation of Bramwell's contributions to cardiology.

Throughout his professional life Bramwell was a tireless worker, and published on cardiovascular topics, pulse wave velocity, aneurysmal dilatation of the left auricle, bundle branch block, quinidine therapy, the heart of athletes, gallop rhythm, the alcoholic heart and on blood pressure and myocardial infarction.

He published 9 books and some 70 papers. His work on the transmission of the arterial pulse and arterial elasticity, his contributions to the study of heart disease in pregnancy, and to the features of the circulation in athletes are well known.

== Family ==
J. Crighton Bramwell's father Byrom Bramwell and eldest brother Edwin Bramwell were elected FRCP and both served as Presidents of the Royal College of Physicians of Edinburgh.

In 1929 Crighton Bramwell married Elsa Violet Risk. Her father James Risk was a whisky distiller, who owned the Bankier Distillery in Banknock, Scotland. Crighton and Elsa Bramwell had two sons, one of whom became a physician, and one daughter, who worked in medical publishing.

== Selected publications ==
- with Keith Lucas: Bramwell, J. Crighton; Lucas, Keith (15 July 1911). "On the relation of the refractory period to the propagated disturbance in nerve". J Physiol. 42 (5–6): 495–511. doi:10.1113/jphysiol.1911.sp001449. PMC 1512855. PMID 16993079.
- Bramwell, J. C. (1926). "Discussion on hyperpiesis". Proc R Soc Med. 19(Gen Rep) (Gen Rep): 39–40. PMC 1948471. PMID 19984983.
- Bramwell, C. (12 April 1930). "A British Medical Association Lecture on Coronary Occlusion". Br Med J. 1 (3614): 681–685. doi:10.1136/bmj.1.3614.681. PMC 2312880. PMID 20775384.
- Bramwell, Crighton (April 1931). "Heart disease complicating pregnancy". Proc R Soc Med. 24 (6): 709–723. doi:10.1177/003591573102400643. PMC 2183425. PMID 19988064.
- Bramwell, C. (30 September 1933). "Radiological diagnosis of cardiac enlargement". Br Med J. 2 (3795): 597–599. doi:10.1136/bmj.2.3795.597. PMC 2369281. PMID 20777798.
- Bramwell, C. (1 June 1935). "Treatment of heart disease in pregnancy". Br Med J. 1 (3882): 1132–1133. doi:10.1136/bmj.1.3882.1132. PMC 2460408. PMID 20779117.
- Bramwell, C. (20 November 1937). "Treatment of heart failure". Br Med J. 2 (4011): 1005–1008. doi:10.1136/bmj.2.4011.1005. PMC 2092838. PMID 20781057.
- with A. Morgan Jones: Jones, A. M.; Bramwell, C. (July 1939). "Alcoholic beri-beri heart". Br Heart J. 1 (3): 187–198. doi:10.1136/hrt.1.3.187. PMC 503853. PMID 18609818.
- with A. Morgan Jones: Bramwell, C.; Jones, A. M. (October 1941). "Coarctation of the aorta: the collateral circulation". Br. Heart J. 3 (4): 205–227. doi:10.1136/hrt.3.4.205. PMC 503469. PMID 18609884.
- Bramwell, C. (January 1942). "War-time problems of a cardiologist". Glasgow Medical Journal. 137 (1): 1–21. PMC 5953156. PMID 30437201.
- Bramwell, C. (January 1943). "Signs simulating those of mitral stenosis". Br Heart J. 5 (1): 24–26. doi:10.1136/hrt.5.1.24. PMC 503508. PMID 18609917.
- with A. Morgan Jones: Bramwell, C.; Jones, A. M. (July 1944). "Acute left auricular failure". Br Heart J. 6 (3): 129–134. doi:10.1136/hrt.6.3.129. PMC 480968. PMID 18609967.
- Bramwell, C. (April 1947). "Coarctation of the aorta: II. Clinical features". Br Heart J. 9 (2): 100–127. doi:10.1136/hrt.9.2.100. PMC 481014. PMID 18610059.
- Bramwell, C. (28 February 1953). "Tachycardia". Br Med J. 1 (480): 500–502. doi:10.1136/bmj.1.4808.500. PMC 2015392. PMID 13009266.
- Bramwell, C. (25 April 1953). "Hazards of pregnancy in women with heart disease". Br Med J. 1 (4816): 897–901. doi:10.1136/bmj.1.4816.897. PMC 2016377. PMID 13032549.
- Bramwell, C. (November 1965). "John Hay and the founders of the Cardiac Club". Br Heart J. 27 (6): 848–855. doi:10.1136/hrt.27.6.848. PMC 490112. PMID 5323429. (See John Hay.)
