= William Allan Jamieson =

Scottish physician and academic author

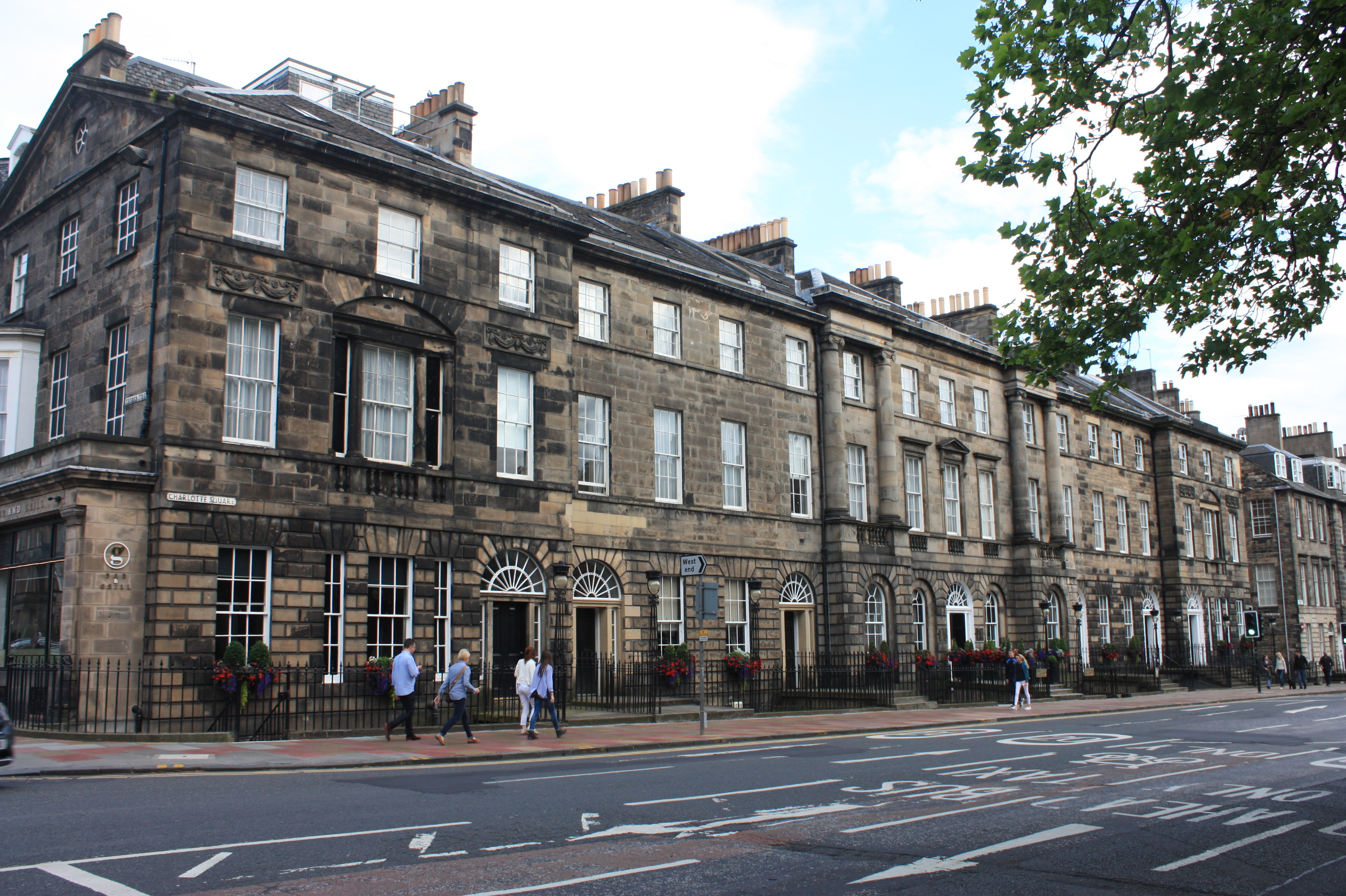
33 to 39 Queen Charlotte Square, Edinburgh

Sir William Allan Jamieson PRCPE LLD (1839–1916) was a Scottish physician and academic author. He served as President of the Royal College of Physicians of Edinburgh 1908 to 1910 being succeeded by Sir Byrom Bramwell.

== Life ==
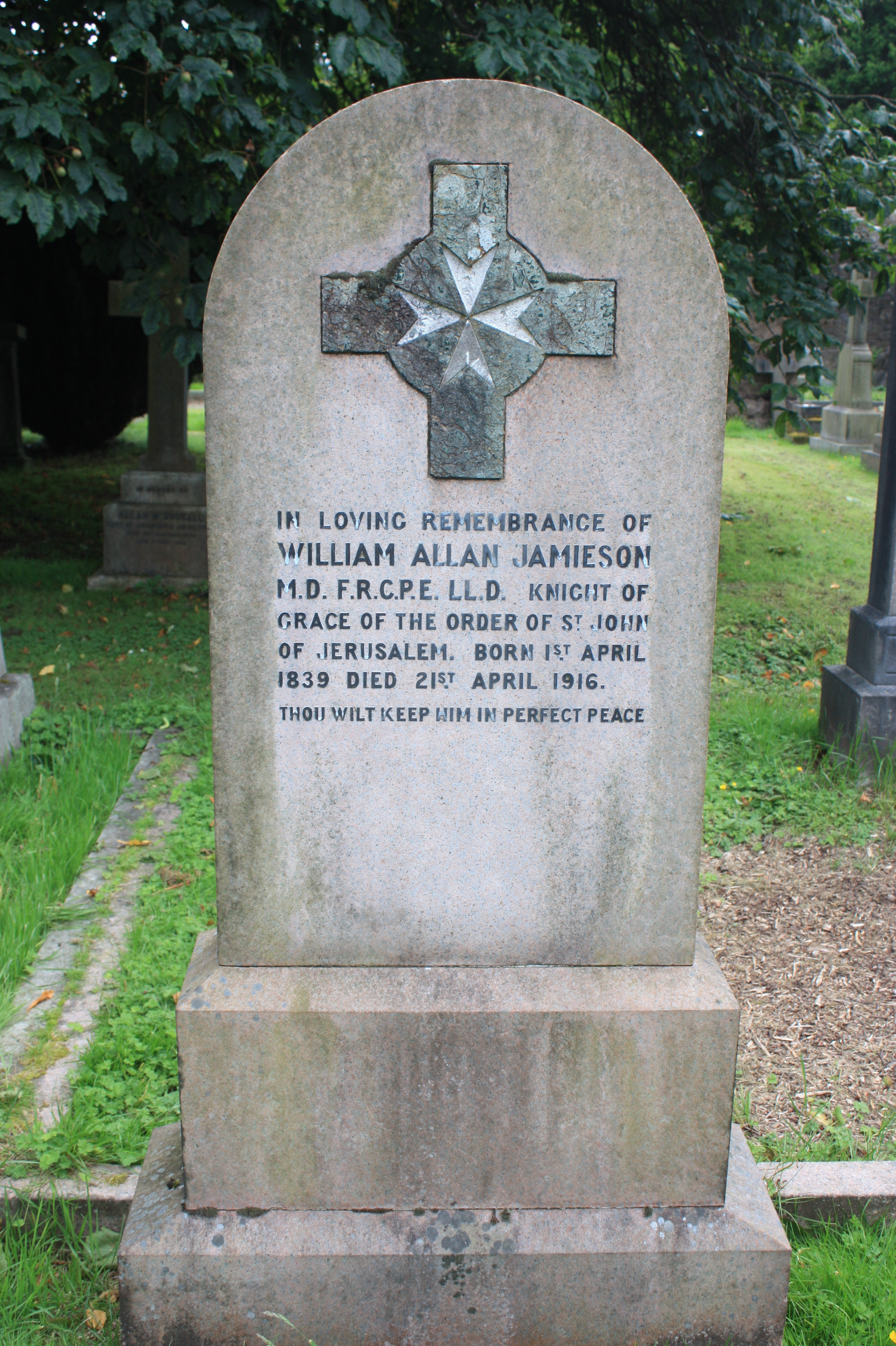
The grave of Sir William Allan Jamieson, Dean Cemetery, Edinburgh

He was born in Dreghorn in Ayrshire on 1 April 1839, the son of John Campbell Jamieson and Mary Young.

In 1881 he was elected a member of the Harveian Society of Edinburgh and in 1903 he was elected a member of the Aesculapian Club. In 1907 he was created a Knight of Grace of the Grand Priory of the Order of the Hospital of St John. In 1908 he was created Surgeon to the Royal Company of Archers by the King.

He lived at 35 Charlotte Square in Edinburgh (one of Edinburgh's most prestigious addresses) and died there on 21 April 1916. The house now forms part of a hotel.

He is buried in the northern Victorian extension to Dean Cemetery.

== Publications ==
- Diseases of the Skin (1901)
- The Care of Skin in Health (1912)

== Artistic recognition ==
He was painted in the uniform of the Royal Company of Archers by Thomas Martine Ronaldson (1881–1942). The portrait hangs in the Royal College of Physicians of Edinburgh. Ronaldson was a neighbour's son, living at 8 Charlotte Square.
