= James Ormiston Affleck =

Scottish physician and medical author

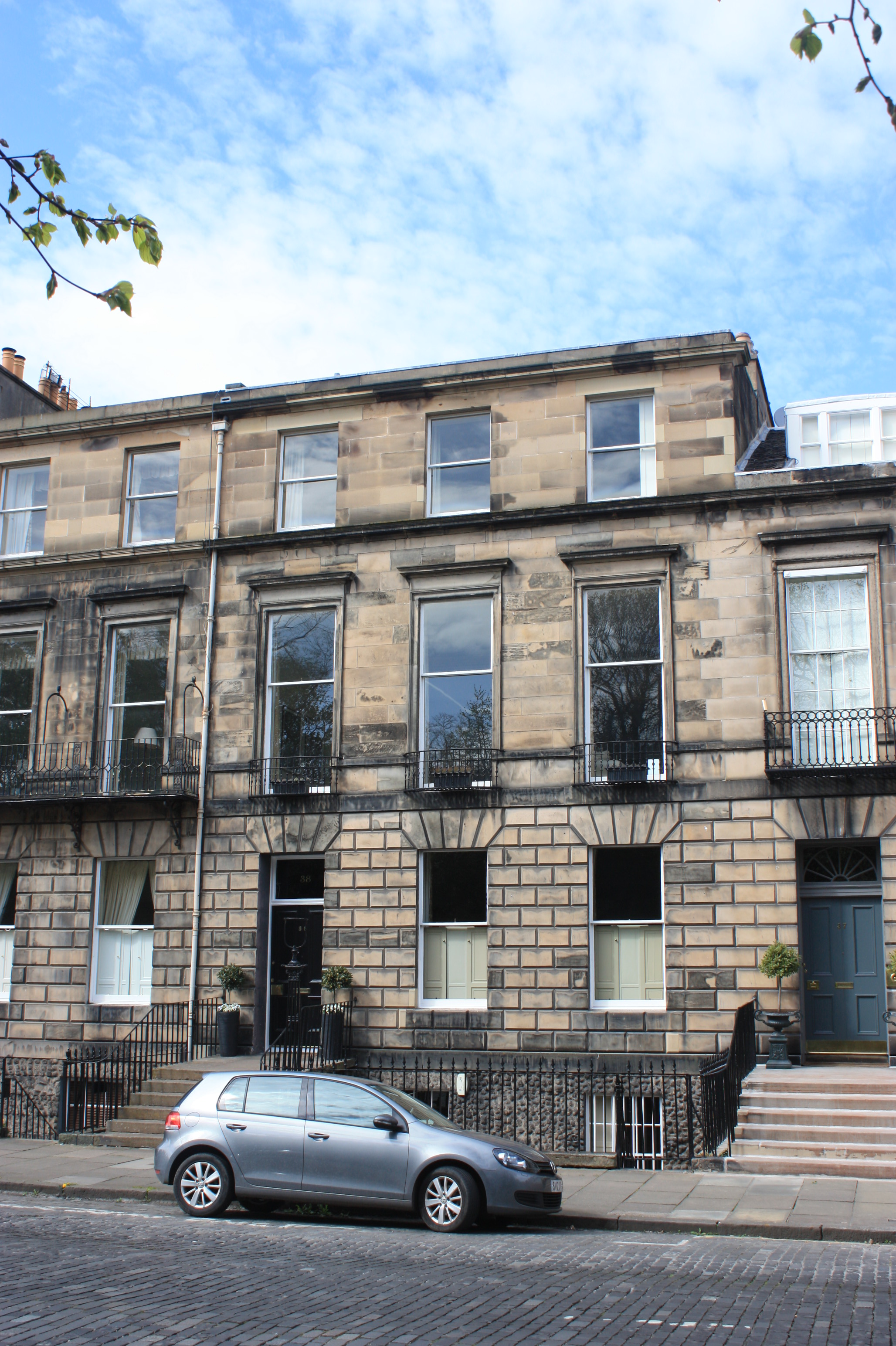
Affleck's large townhouse at 38 Heriot Row, Edinburgh

Sir James Ormiston Affleck FRSE (19 July 1840 – 24 September 1922) was a Scottish physician and medical author.

== Life ==
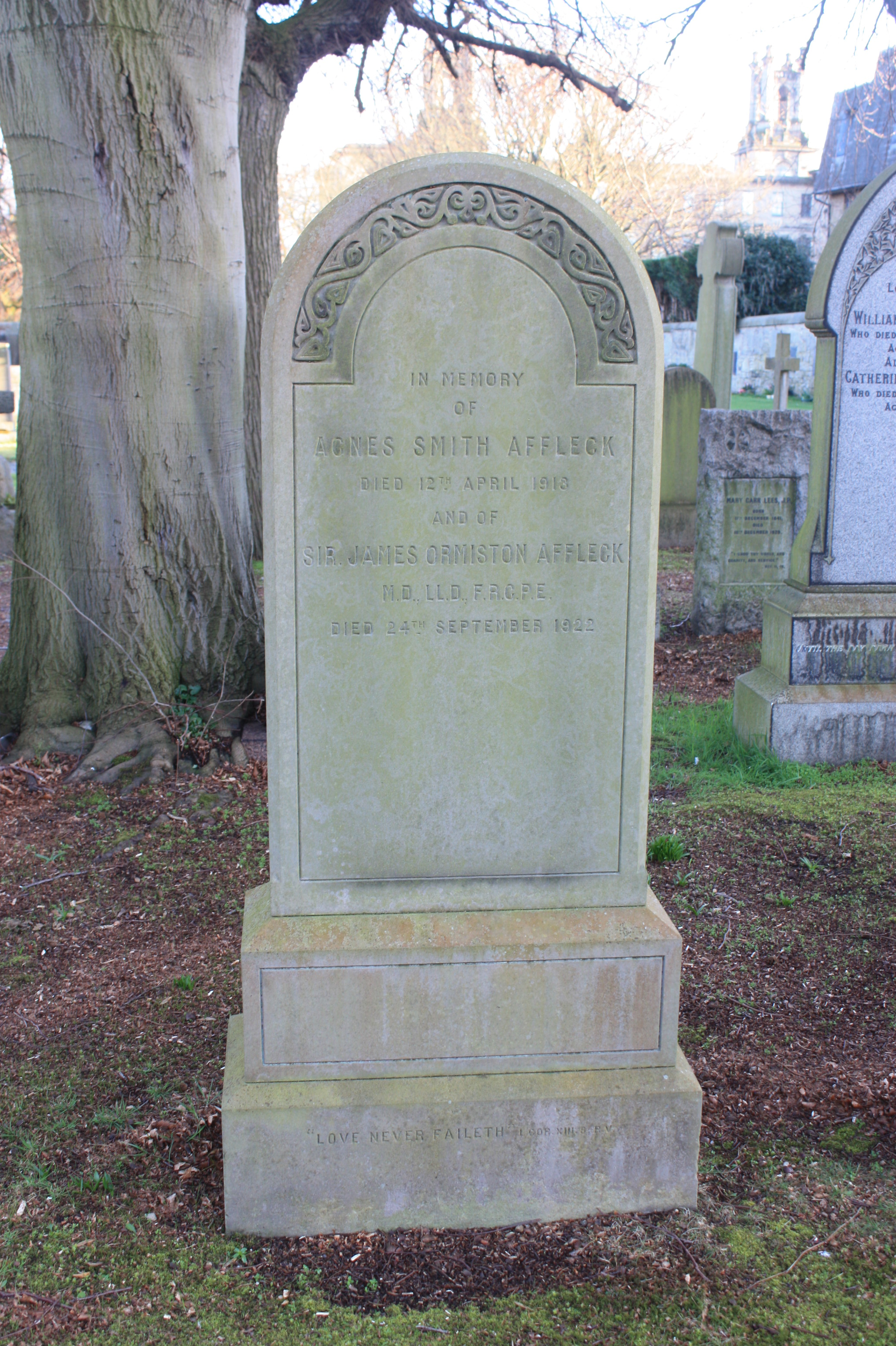
The grave of James Ormiston Affleck, Dean Cemetery, Edinburgh

Affleck was born in Edinburgh in 1840, but not to a medical family. He studied medicine at the University of Edinburgh, graduating in 1867 with MB ChB. He completed his doctorate in 1869 and began practicing in the Stockbridge area of the city, operating from 12 Claremont Place. He also took on the role of public vaccinator at the New Town Dispensary.

Sir Douglas Maclagan grew aware of his talents and chose Affleck as his assistant in the University and at the Edinburgh Royal Infirmary. In 1877 Affleck became the official Assistant Physician. He was promoted to official Physician to the infirmary in 1885. He retired from the Infirmary in 1900 and took on the role of Consulting Physician for the City Fever Hospital, and also worked at the Longmore Hospital for Incurables.

In 1896 he was elected a Fellow of the Royal Society of Edinburgh. His proposers were Sir Douglas Maclagan, Sir William Turner, Alexander Crum Brown and Sir Thomas Richard Fraser. In 1905 he served as President of the Edinburgh Medico-Chirurgical Society.

In later life he lived at 38 Heriot Row, a Georgian townhouse in Edinburgh’s New Town. The University of Edinburgh gave him a further honorary doctorate (LLD) in 1908. He was knighted at Holyrood Palace in 1911 by King George V for his services to medicine.

He died at home on 24 September 1922, and is buried with his wife Agnes in the north-west section of the first north extension of Dean Cemetery in western Edinburgh.

== Family ==
His son, also James Ormiston Affleck, was educated at Edinburgh Academy and later served as a Major in the Royal Engineers during the First World War.

== Publications ==
- Functional Disorders of the Heart (1869)
- Practice of Physic (1883) co-written with Byrom Bramwell
- Skin Diseases (1887)
- Article on Fever in Encyclopaedia Britannica (1902)
