= Hamelin Trelawny =

Governor of Saint Helena and British army officer

Colonel Hamelin Trelawny

Governor of St Helena
- In office 6 January 1842 – 3 May 1846
- Preceded by: George Middlemore
- Succeeded by: Sir Patrick Ross

Personal details
- Born: 16 October 1782 Trelawny, United Kingdom
- Died: 3 May 1846 (aged 63) Saint Helena
- Spouse: Martha Rogers (m. 1806)
- Relations: Sir Harry Trelawny (father); Sir William Salusbury-Trelawny (brother)

Military service
- Allegiance: United Kingdom
- Branch/service: British Army
- Years of service: 1798–1846
- Rank: Colonel
- Unit: Royal Artillery
- Battles/wars: French Revolutionary Wars; Anglo-Russian Invasion of Holland; Battle of Bergen; Napoleonic Wars; Peninsular War; Battle of Orthez

Hamelin Trelawny (16 October 1782 – 3 May 1846) was a British army officer who served as governor of Saint Helena. Born to nobility, he would enlist in the British military in 1798, rising to the rank of colonel by 1841. He was appointed Governor of Saint Helena on 24 August 1841, serving in the position until his death.

== Early life ==
Hamelin was born to Sir Harry Trelawny, 7th Baronet and Anne Browne (died 18 November 1822). He had 5 siblings:

1. John Trelawney (28 January 1780 – 31 October 1821)
2. Sir William Salusbury-Trelawny, 8th Baronet (4 July 1781 – 15 November 1856)
3. Colonel Jonathan Trelawny (30 August 1786 – 13 September 1855)
4. Anne Letitia (22 January 1779 – 6 July 1860)
5. Mary Harding (died 1857)

== Military service ==
Hamelin entered into the service of the Royal Regiment of Artillery in 1798, serving in Holland the following year. He later served in the Peninsular War between 1813 and 1814. He served as captain of the regiment's A Battery, 14th Brigade between 1826 and 1831. Following this, he was promoted to the position of lieutenant-colonel on 27 June 1831.

On 27 November 1841, Hamelin was promoted to the position of colonel.

== Saint Helena ==
Hamelin was appointed Governor of Saint Helena on 24 August 1841. He assumed the role on 6 January 1842, succeeding Major General George Middlemore. He promptly raised 5 companies in England under the St. Helena Regiment in order to replace the line regiments at Saint Helena. Following his death, he was succeeded by Lieutenant-Colonel G.C Fraser as acting Governor on 4 May 1846, with Sir Patrick Ross assuming the role of Governor on 23 November 1846.

== Personal life ==
Hamelin married Martha Rogers (died 6 January 1864) in 1806. They had six children:

1. Mary Trelawny (m. 5 September 1831, died 10 June 1849)
2. Mary Matilda
3. Agnes Matilda (m. 12 June 1866)
4. Emily Letitia (m. 1 June 1847, died 16 June 1871)
5. Jane la Vallin Trelawny (m. 18 December 1842)
6. Edward Harry Trelawny

He died on 3 May 1846 in Saint Helena. A few days prior to his death, he was paralyzed in his left side.

Political offices
Preceded by George Middlemore	Governor of Saint Helena; 1842–1846	Succeeded by Sir Patrick Ross
