= Byrom Bramwell =

British physician and medical author

Sit Byrom Bramwell FRSE FRCPE
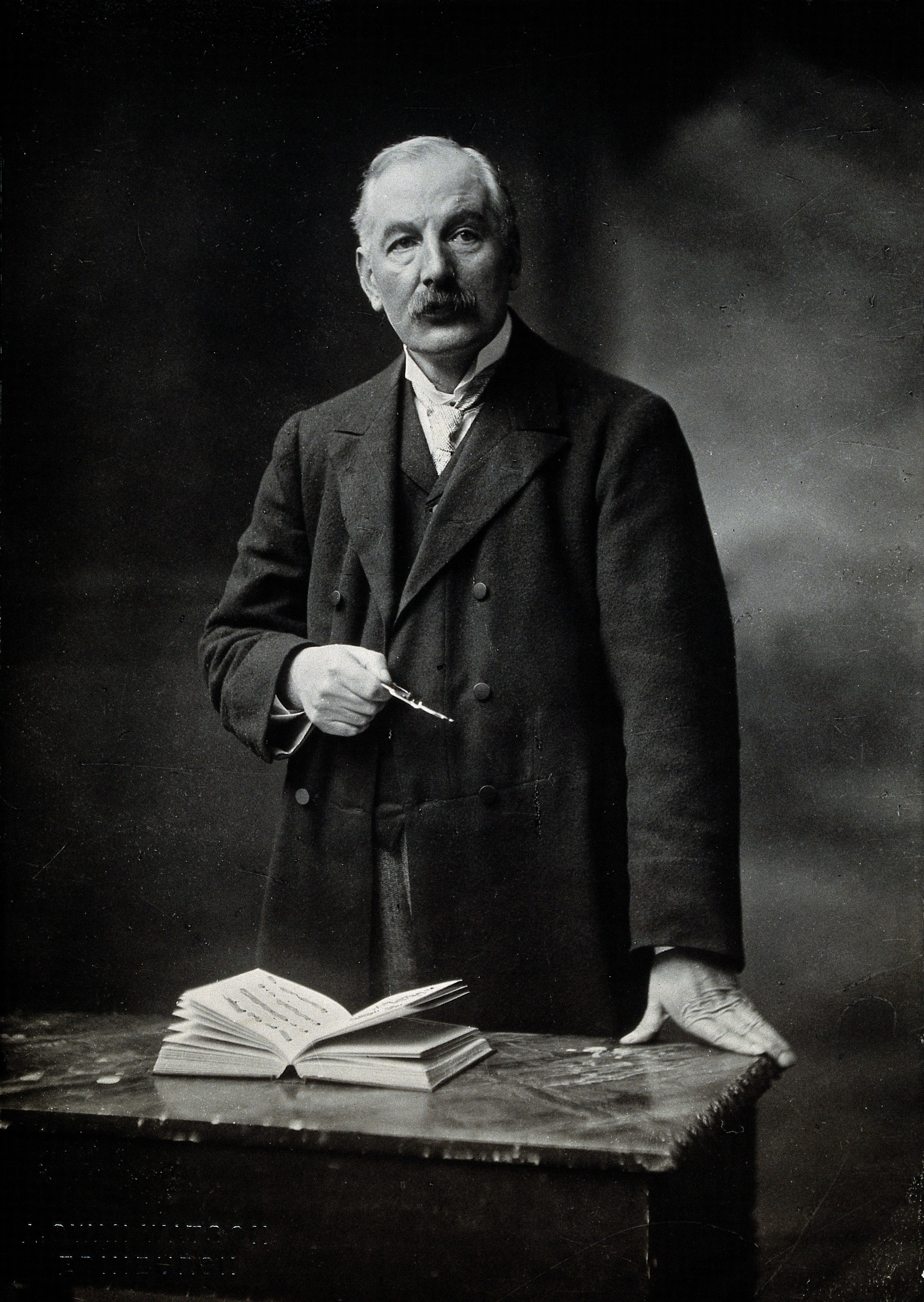
- Born: 18 December 1847; North Shields, Northumberland, England
- Died: 27 April 1931 (aged 83); Edinburgh, Scotland
- Burial place: Dean Cemetery
- Education: University of Edinburgh
- Occupation: Physician
- Title: President of the Royal College of Physicians of Edinburgh
- Term: 1910-1912
- Predecessor: Sir William Allan Jamieson
- Successor: John James Graham Brown
- Spouse: Martha Crighton (married 1872-1919)
- Children: 2 daughters, and 3 sons, including; J. Crighton Bramwell; Edwin Bramwell
- Parents: Dr John Byrom Bramwell; Mary Young

Sir Byrom Bramwell FRSE FRCPE (18 December 1847 – 27 April 1931) was a British physician and medical author. He was a general physician, but became known for his work in neurology, diseases of the heart and blood, and disorders of the endocrine organs. He was president of the Royal College of Physicians of Edinburgh.

== Early life ==
Bramwell was born on 18 December 1847 in North Shields in northern England, the son of Mary Young and Dr John Byrom Bramwell.

He was educated at Cheltenham College and then in 1865 travelled to Scotland to study medicine at the University of Edinburgh. There he studied under the eminent anatomist, John Goodsir, as well as a number of other prominent Edinburgh physicians, including John Hughes Bennett, James Syme, and James Young Simpson. A keen sportsman, Bramwell also captained the University cricket team.

== Career ==
In 1869, he became house surgeon under James Spence at the Royal Infirmary of Edinburgh, but his father’s sudden illness caused him to return to North Shields to take up his role as a local general practitioner. Intent on a career in hospital medicine, in 1874 he took over the role of physician and pathologist at Newcastle Royal Infirmary.

In 1879, he returned to Edinburgh to work as a physician, becoming a member of the Royal College of Physicians the following year. In 1880 he was elected a member of the Harveian Society of Edinburgh. In 1885 he was living at 23 Drumsheugh Gardens, next door to Dr Kirk Duncanson.

He became a lecturer in the Edinburgh Extra-mural School of Medicine. In this post he took part in the education of women medical students who were still at that time excluded from the University of Edinburgh. He was made pathologist to the Royal Infirmary of Edinburgh in 1882 and assistant physician in 1885. In 1897 he was appointed a physician at the Royal Infirmary. Bramwell was among the first to teach clinical medicine to women at the Infirmary. In 1900 he applied unsuccessfully for the Chair of Medicine at the University of Edinburgh.

Bramwell was a prolific writer publishing ten textbooks and some 160 papers. His first major work Diseases of the Spinal Cord (1881), was translated into French, German and Russian, and won great popularity in the United States. ’’Intracranial Tumours’’ (1888) also won international acclaim. Among students and contemporaries he had a reputation as an outstanding clinical teacher and diagnostician.

In 1886, he was elected a Fellow of the Royal Society of Edinburgh. His proposers were William Turner, James Cossar Ewart, Robert Gray, and Peter Guthrie Tait. In 1908 he was elected a member of the Aesculapian Club. He succeeded William Allan Jamieson as President of the Royal College of Physicians of Edinburgh in 1910. He was knighted by King George V in 1924.

He died at his home, 10 Heriot Row in Edinburgh, on 27 April 1931 and was buried in Dean Cemetery close to his former anatomy teacher John Goodsir.

== Family ==
In 1872 he married Martha Crighton (died 1919) in 1872., and together they had two daughters and three sons, J. Crighton Bramwell FRCP FRCPE, a physician who became Professor of Cardiology in Manchester, Professor Edwin Bramwell FRSE FRCPE (1873–1952), a neurologist who was also President of the Royal College of Physicians of Edinburgh, and Byrom Stanley Bramwell FRSE (1877–1948), who became an advocate.

== Publications ==
- ’’Diseases of the Spinal Cord’’ (1881)
- Practice of Physic (1883) co-written with James Ormiston Affleck
- ’’Intracranial Tumours’’ (1888)
- ’’Atlas of Clinical Medicine’’ 3 vols (1892-6)
- ’’Lectures on Aphasia’’ (1897)
- ’’Anaemia and some Diseases of the Blood Forming Organs and Ductless Glands’’ (1899)

Academic offices
Preceded by Sir William Allan Jamieson	President of the Royal College of Physicians of Edinburgh; 1910–1911	Succeeded by John Joseph Graham Brown
