= Charles Dallas =

British Colonial Governor and general

East India Company Governor of St. Helena
- In office 6 Feb 1828 – 1834

Personal details
- Born: c. 1767 Edinburgh, Scotland
- Died: 26 April 1855 (aged 87–88) Exmouth, Exeter, England
- Spouse: Janet (m. 1801; died 1855)
- Children: 7
- Parent: William Dallas (father)
- Military career
- Allegiance: Great Britain
- Branch: Honourable East India Company
- Rank: Brigadier-General
- Units: Shropshire Corps of Yeomanry, St. Helena Regiment of Infantry
- Conflicts: Napoleonic Wars

Charles Dallas (c. 1767—26 April 1855), was a British military officer and colonial administrator. He served as the last East India Company Governor of Saint Helena.

== Early life and family ==
Dallas was born in Edinburgh, the seventh son of William Dallas of North Newton (1719/20–1785), and younger brother of Lieutenant-General Sir Thomas Dallas (died 1839); his mother was the second wife of William Dallas, Davidona Haliburton (marriage 1754).

== Career ==
Dallas spent many years in the service of the Honourable East India Company.

During the Napoleonic Wars he joined the Shropshire Corps of Yeomanry, Captain of the Troop, 15 January 1804, promotion granted by Lord Berwick.

He became Colonel of the St. Helena Regiment of Infantry, granted 11 August 1827. Dallas achieved the rank of Brigadier-General at St. Helena and eastward of the Cape of Good Hope on 14 February 1828. On 6 February 1828, while still a colonel, he took the oath of governor of St. Helena. He was the last East India Company Governor of Saint Helena, a position he held from 1828–1834.

== Death ==
Dallas died on 26 April 1855, at Trefusis House in Exmouth 'in his 88th year', having survived his wife Janet and his three youngest sons.

== Family ==
Dallas married, on 9 January 1801, at Edinburgh, Janet, only surviving child of George Cockburn Haldane (see Clan Haldane) 18th of Gleneagles (baptised 15 June 1729; marriage certificate 9 May 1766; died 2 March 1799) by his first wife, Bethia, daughter of Thomas Dundas of Fingask and Carronhall and his second wife Lady Janet Maitland (born 1720; died 29 December 1805), daughter of the Earl of Lauderdale.

The eldest son, Capt. Thomas Dallas Haldane, drowned at sea in 1857. The second son Capt. Charles Dallas (1803–1840), born in Llymston, died in Saugor. He was twice married: firstly in 1831 to Penelope Long (died 1834 in Chunar), daughter of Capt. Stephen Long of the St Helena Regiment; and secondly in 1836 in Calcutta to Eliza Helen Mellis, daughter of Dr James Mellis. He left no issue.

The three daughters, Bethia, Davidona Eleanor (married Vice-Admiral Francis Harding, fifth son of William Harding of Baraset) and Caroline, all had issue.
