= David Aitken (minister) =

Scottish minister and church historian (1796–1875)

The Reverend David Aitken FRSE
- Born: 17 August 1796 in or near Edinburgh, Scotland
- Died: 27 March 1875 (aged 78); Edinburgh, Scotland
- Resting place: Dean Cemetery
- Education: University of Edinburgh
- Occupations: Minister; church historian
- Known for: Minister of Minto
- Spouse: Elizabeth Stodart (m. 1836; died 1869)
- Church: Church of Scotland

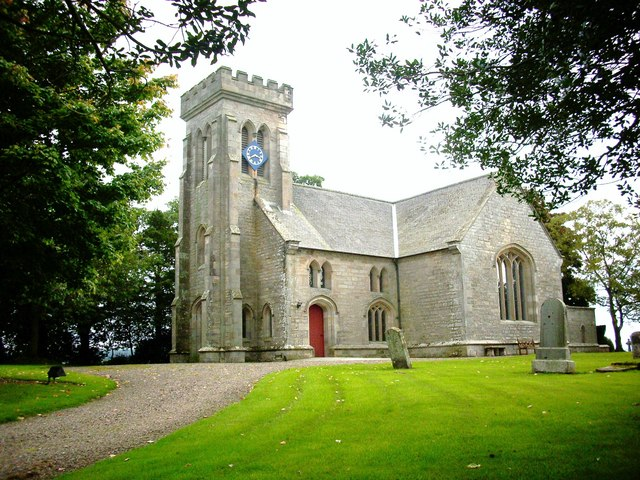
Minto Church

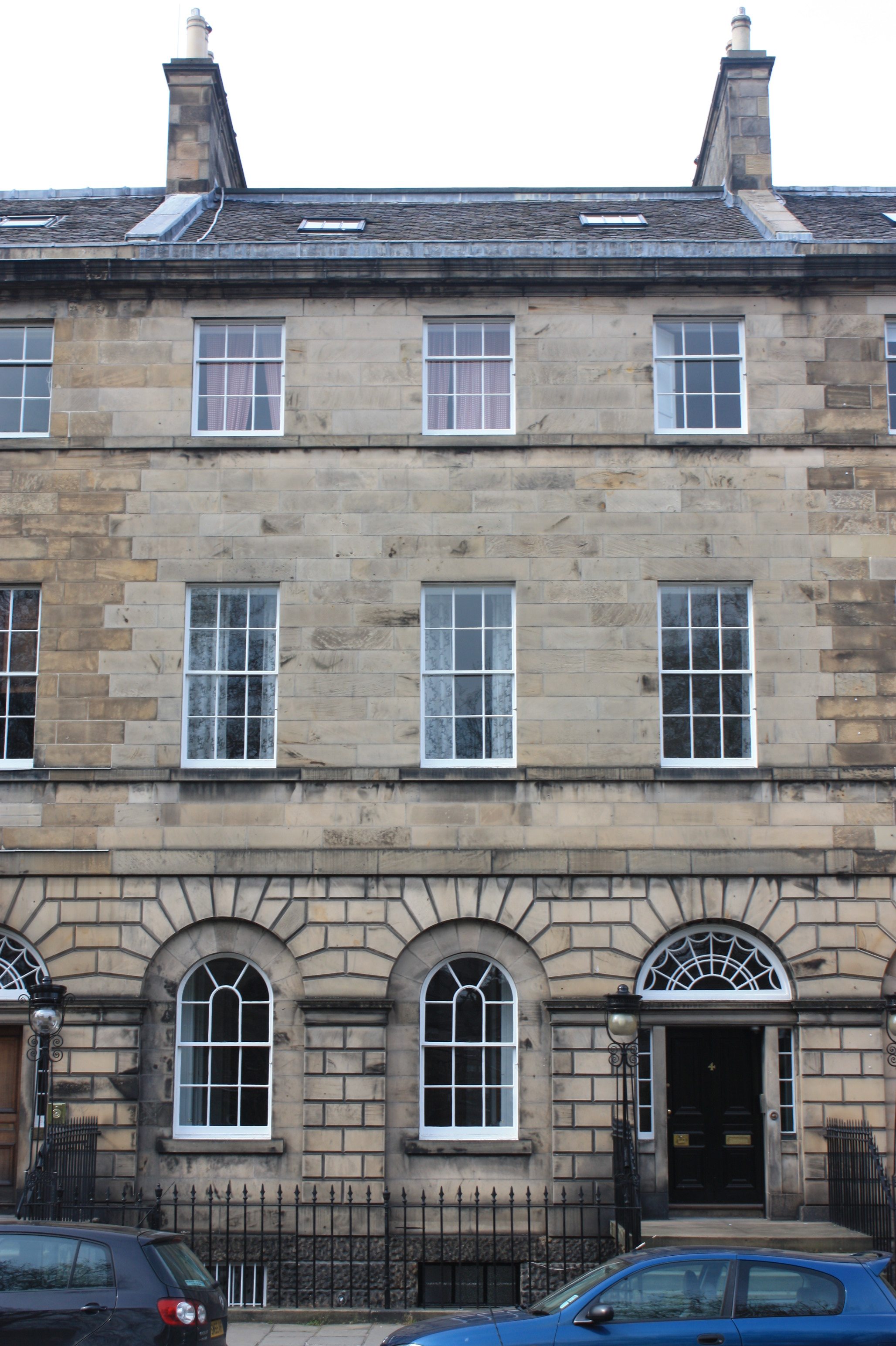
4 Charlotte Square, Edinburgh

David Aitken FRSE (17 August 1796 – 27 March 1875) was a Scottish minister and church historian.

== Early life ==
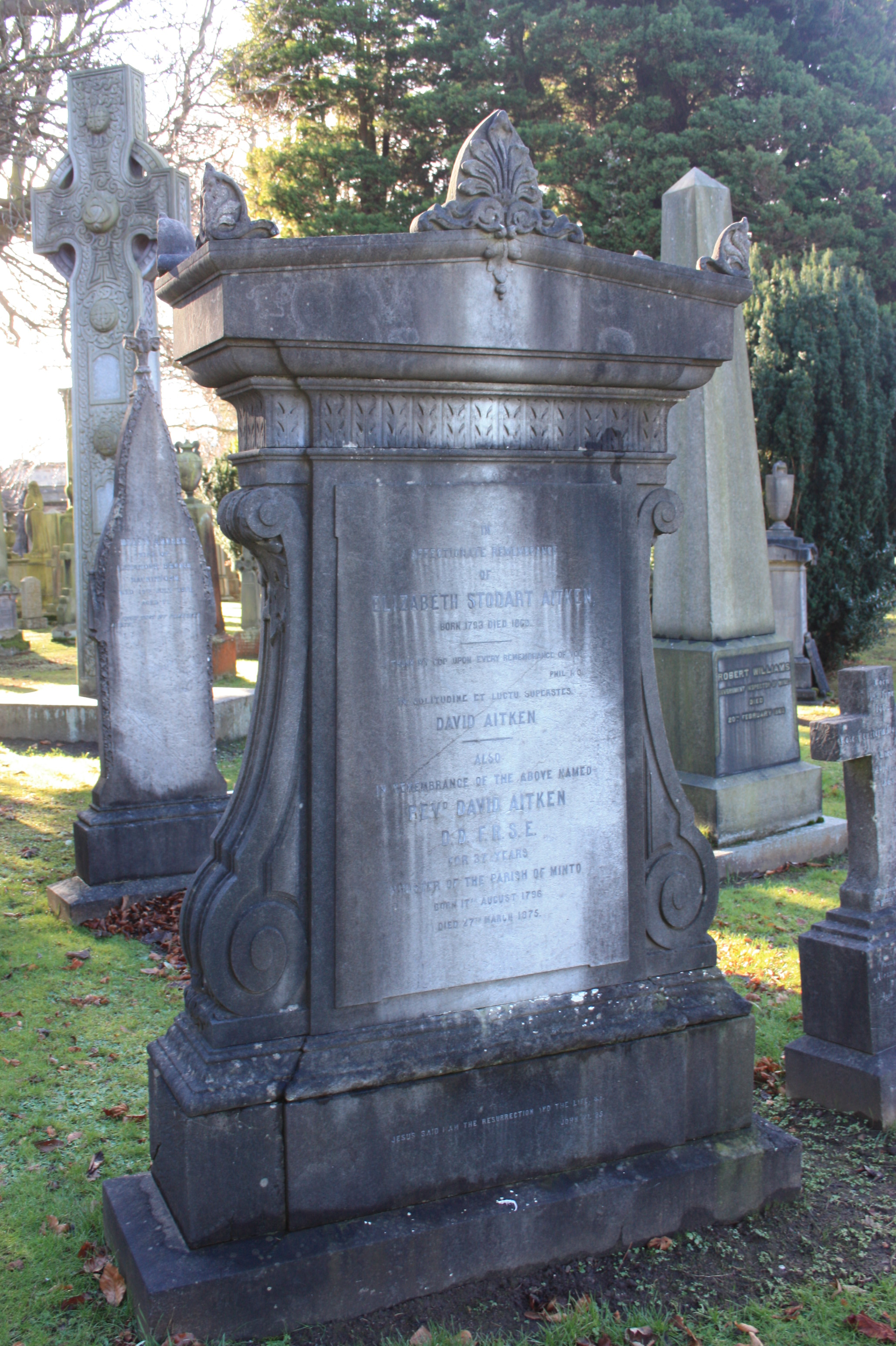
The grave of Rev David Aitken, Dean Cemetery, Edinburgh

He was born on 17 August 1796 in or near Edinburgh. He was educated at the High School in Edinburgh then studied divinity at the University of Edinburgh.

== Career ==
His main position as minister was at Minto in Roxburghshire from 1827 to 1864. His patron was the Earl of Minto. A letter of introduction from Thomas Carlyle aided in gaining this position.

In 1868 he was elected a Fellow of the Royal Society of Edinburgh, his proposer being Sir David Brewster.

He is listed as a patron of John Kay's famous book of Edinburgh characters.

== Personal life and death ==
In 1836 he married Elizabeth ("Bess") Stodart of Dunsyre (1793-1869). She was the niece of John Bradfute, a bookseller living at 22 George Square and was a friend of Thomas Carlyle's wife, Jane Welsh Carlyle, who lived at 23 George Square. He retired to 4 Charlotte Square in Edinburgh in 1866.

He died on 27 March 1875 at home, 4 Charlotte Square, a huge townhouse in one of the city's most prestigious addresses. He is buried in Dean Cemetery close to the ornate marble Leishman monument on the southern path. His house at Charlotte Square was purchased by Very Rev George Ritchie.
