= Theodosia (ship) =

Several ships have been named Theodosia:

- Theodosia (1782 ship) was built at Shields in 1782. She spent 20 years trading with the Baltic, and then another dozen trading with North America and the Baltic. From 1816 she traded with India, sailing under a license from the British East India Company. She was wrecked while returning from a voyage to India in 1825.
- Theodosia (1815 ship) was built in the United States in 1811, almost certainly under another name. She was taken in prize and a began sailing under the British flag in 1815. She sailed between London and India under a license from the British East India Company (EIC). She caught fire in February 1820 and her crew and passengers had to abandon ship.
- HMS Venturer was launched at Livorno in 1807 as the French privateer Nouvelle Enterprise. The Royal Navy captured her in 1807 in the West Indies and initially took her into service. It renamed her Theodosia (or Theodocia) in 1808. She served in the Mediterranean until the Navy sold her in 1814. She then became the mercantile Theodosia. She traded between London and Rio de Janeiro and was last listed in 1822.
- Theodocia (1830 ship), of 290 tons (bm), was built at Liverpool.
- Theodosia (1831 ship) was a snow of 273 tons (bm), built at Sunderland.
