= William Harding of Baraset =

Gentleman of the Privy Chamber to George III

William Harding of Baraset (1759–1822) was a Gentleman of the Privy Chamber to George III, magistrate and deputy lieutenant of Warwickshire. According to the BBC, he was born in 1760 and went to India as a civil servant in the East India Company.
