= Dustbin category =

The term "dustbin category" is sometimes used to describe a category that includes people or things that might be heterogeneous, only loosely related or poorly understood. It has been used in discussion of law, linguistics, medicine, sociology and other disciplines. For example:

Some patients' symptoms do not fit well with any recognised category and there is a danger these may be forced into a 'dustbin' category such as 'depression, not otherwise specified.'

== See also ==
- Wastebasket taxon
