= James Macadam Hare =

Scottish physician

James Macadam Hare FRSE FRCS (1775–1831) was a Scottish medical doctor, closely linked to India, who was employed by the East India Company.

== Life ==
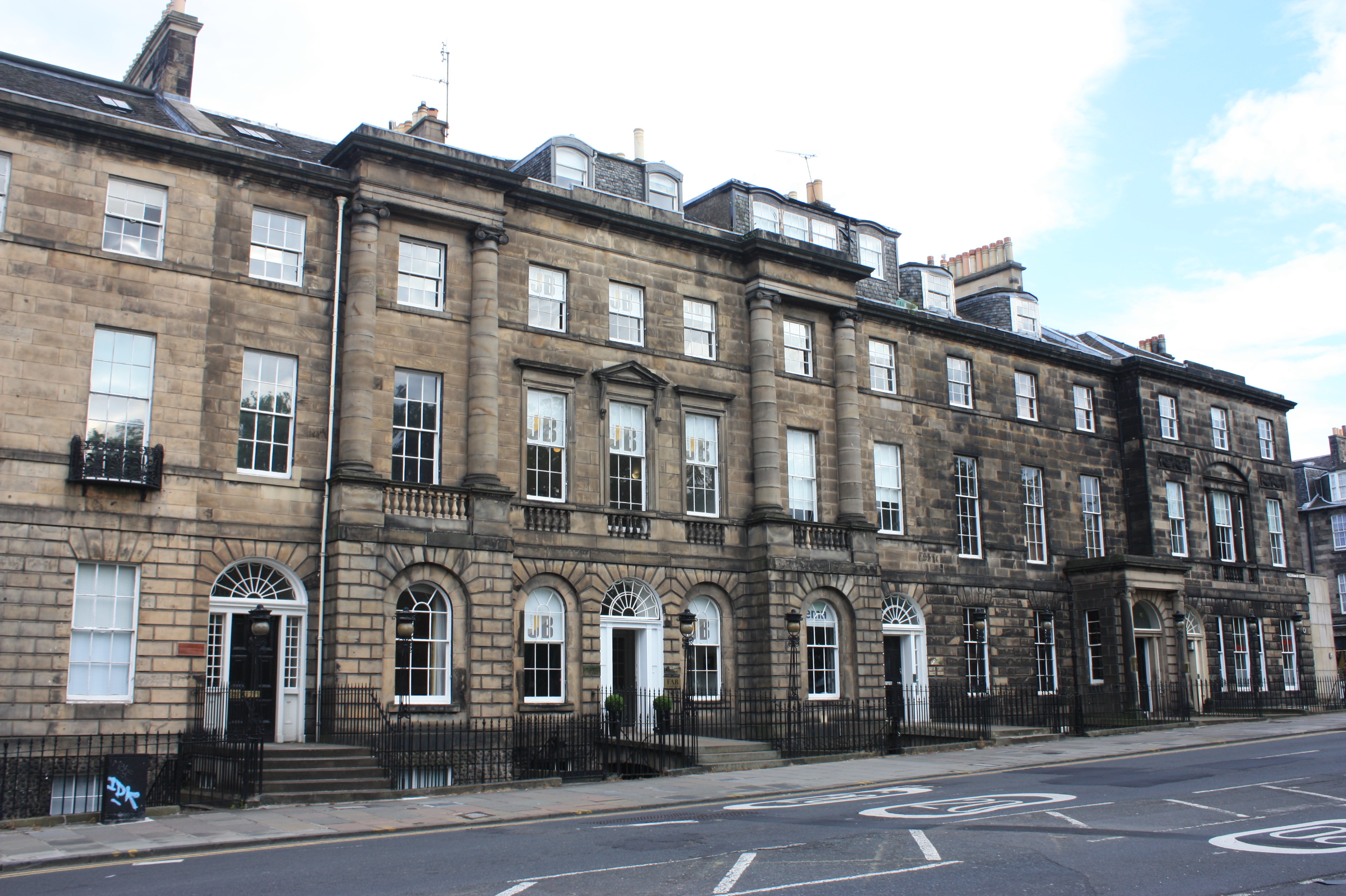
45 Charlotte Square, Edinburgh (on left hand side)

He was born on 13 September 1775; the son of Dr James Hare of Calderhall FRSE FSA, probably at Calderhall, just west of Edinburgh. His father spent much of his life as a physician in the East Indies.

Hare studied medicine at the University of Edinburgh and graduated with an MD in 1796. He joined the East India Company in 1802 serving as a surgeon in their Indian Medical Service there until 1814, when he then transferred to be surgeon of the President of Calcutta. He spent much of his time travelling between Scotland and India. In 1813 he was elected a Fellow of the Royal Society of Edinburgh. His proposers were Thomas Allan, Dr James Russell and David Brewster.

In 1823 he served as President of the Medical and Physical Society of Calcutta.

He retired in 1827 and returned to live in Edinburgh. He died at his home, 45 Charlotte Square in Edinburgh on 12 February 1831.
