= Scottish feudal barony of Melville =

Scottish feudal barony in Midlothian

The Barony of Melville was a Scottish feudal barony situated in Midlothian, Scotland. The barony was created in the 12th century for the Anglo-Norman knight Galfrid de Maleville, with its caput baroniae at Melville Castle.

== History ==
During the reign of King David I (r. 1124–1153), Anglo-Norman knights were invited to settle in Scotland and granted feudal estates. Among them was Galfrid de Maleville, whose family originated from the barony of Malleville in the Pays de Caux region of Normandy. Galfrid named his Midlothian manor Maleville (later anglicized to Melville), establishing the caput of the barony on the banks of the River North Esk. His descendants held the barony until the mid-15th century.

In the 15th century, the senior line of Melville of that Ilk ended in an heiress, Agnes Melville, daughter of Thomas Melville. Through her marriage to Robert Ross of Halkhead, the barony passed to the Ross family of Halkhead in Renfrewshire.

The barony remained in the possession of the Ross family for over two centuries. During the 16th century, Mary, Queen of Scots frequently visited the estate at Melville. In 1633, the ecclesiastical parish of Melville was suppressed and its territory was united into the neighboring parish of Lasswade. The Ross family retained the barony until 1705, when the estate was sold.

After acquiring the barony, the Dundas family of Arniston, the statesman Henry Dundas commissioned the architect James Playfair to construct the present castellated Gothic mansion. In 1802, Dundas was raised to the Peerage of the United Kingdom as Viscount Melville.

The Abolition of Feudal Tenure etc. (Scotland) Act 2000 ended the feudal landholding system, but it preserved the dignity of baronies as titles of honour.

== Caput ==
The historical caput of the barony is Melville Castle, located approximately 1 mile (1.6 km) northeast of Lasswade and 6 miles (9.7 km) south of Edinburgh. The original medieval fortification was replaced by a 16th-century tower house built by the Lords Ross, which in turn was replaced by James Playfair's late-18th-century mansion.

== Feudal barons of Melville ==
- Galfrid de Maleville fl. 1153–1177.
- John de Maleville fl. 1296
- Agnes, Baroness Melville fl. 1450–1496, heiress of Melville, married Robert Ross of Halkhead.
- John Ross, 2nd Lord Ross 1496–1513, heir to his mother in 1496; killed at the Battle of Flodden.
- Henry Dundas, 1st Viscount Melville, created Viscount Melville in 1802.

== See also ==
- Baronage of Scotland
- Clan Melville
