= Elizabeth Rannie =

British noblewoman

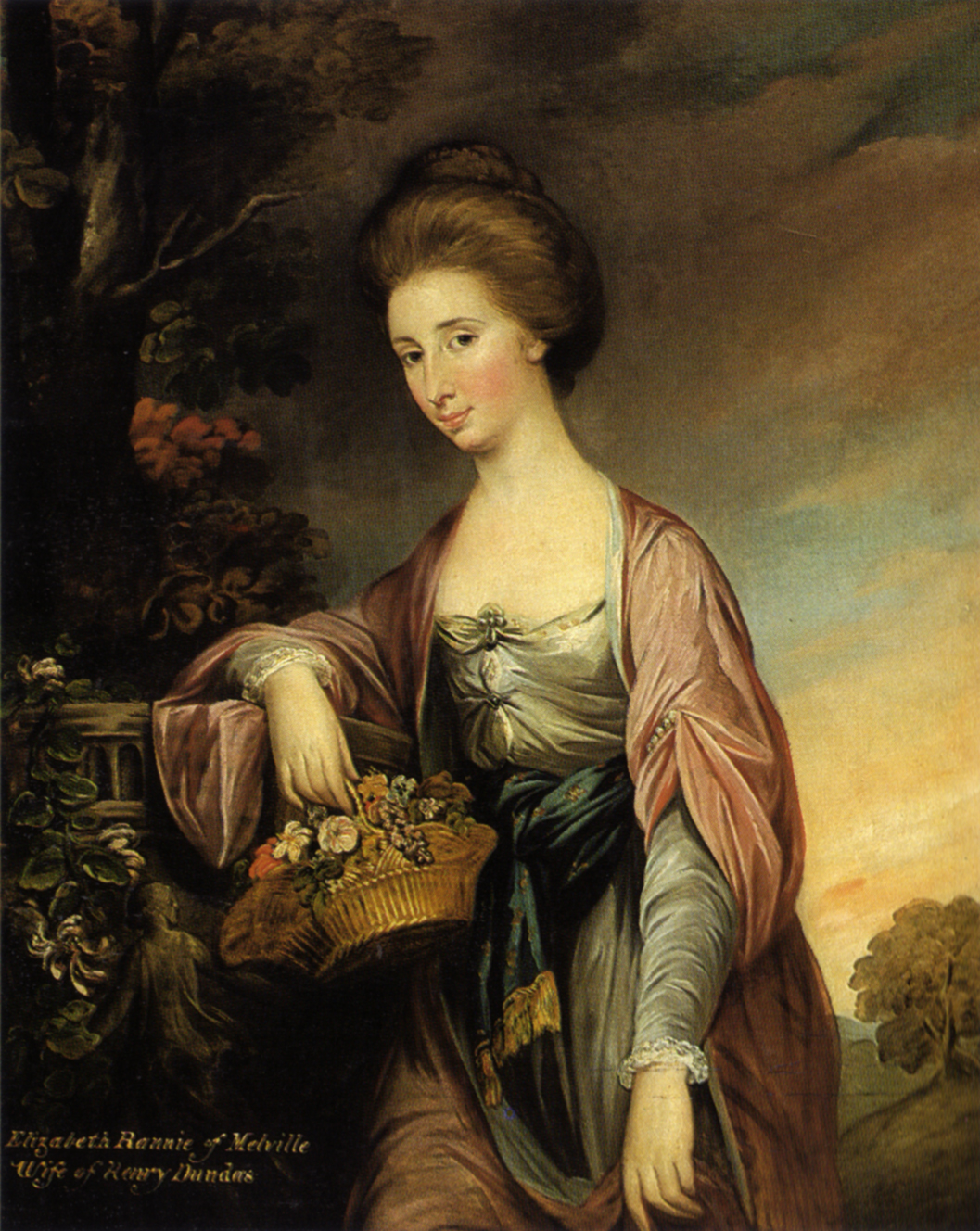
- Portrait by David Martin
- Born: c. 1750; Calcutta
- Died: June 1847 (aged 96–97); Cornwall, England
- Spouse(s): Henry Dundas, 1st Viscount Melville (m. 1765; div. 1778); Captain Everard Fawkener (m. 1778, unknown)
- Issue: Elizabeth Dundas; Anne Dundas; Robert Dundas, 2nd Viscount Melville; Montague Dundas
- Father: David Rannie
- Mother: Elizabeth Bayley

Elizabeth Rannie, also known as Elizabeth Rennie, (1750–1847) was a British noblewoman who was married to Henry Dundas, 1st Viscount Melville, and was mother to Robert Dundas, 2nd Viscount Melville.

== Early life ==
Elizabeth was born in Calcutta around 1750. Her father, David Rannie, was a Captain in the British merchant service, and amassed a considerable fortune in India. Her mother was Elizabeth Bayley. A younger sister, Janet, was born around 1753.

In 1760, with the fortune amassed through 30 years of trading with the East India Company in Calcutta, her father purchased Melville Castle.

In November 1764 her father died, aged 48, leaving the estate and a considerable dowry to Elizabeth, then aged 13 or 14, and her younger sister Janet.

Her sister married Archibald Cockburn in 1768.

== Marriage to Dundas ==
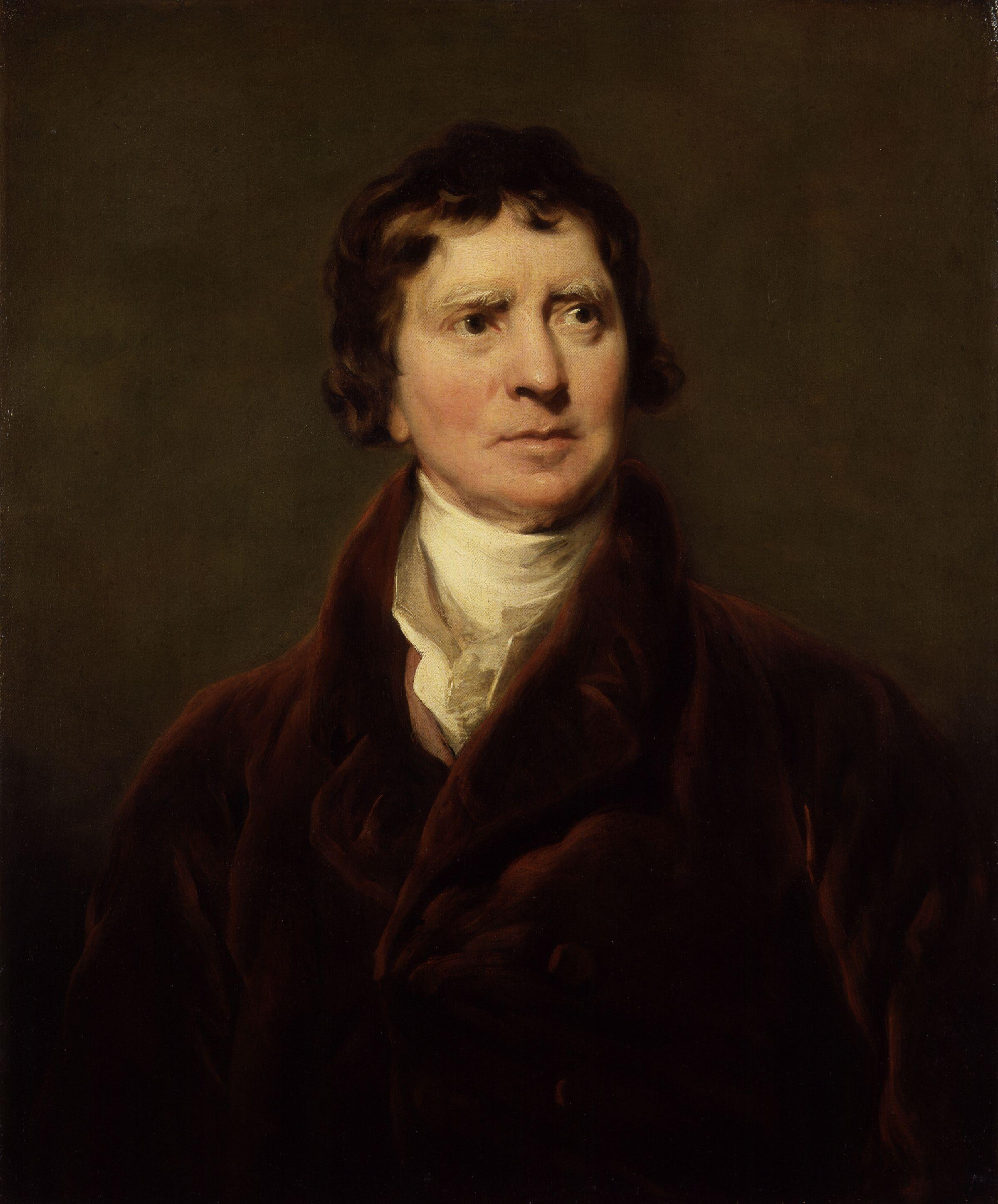
Henry Dundas, 1st Viscount Melville, first husband of Elizabeth Rannie

On 16 August 1765, Elizabeth Rannie and Henry Dundas were married; she was 14 years old, and he was 24. Through the union, Dundas acquired the Melville castle and estate, and her fortune; these represented almost all of his wealth. Her £10,000 fortune was lost by Dundas through an investment in Douglas, Heron & Company, also known as the Ayr Bank, which crashed in 1772. Numerous Scottish land owners were bankrupted in the collapse. Melville castle was mortgaged as a result of the misinvestment, and the countess and family impoverished. Dundas also had income through work with the corporation of Edinburgh and the Church of Scotland, as well as legal work. In 1766 he was appointed solicitor-general for Scotland. Rannie and Dundas lived between Edinburgh, where they lived at 5 George Square, Edinburgh, and Melville Castle. Rannie and Dundas had four children:

- Elizabeth, born in May 1766, died in 1852. Married her first cousin, Robert Dundas of Arniston.
- Anne, born in September 1768, died in 1852.
- Robert Dundas, 2nd Viscount Melville, born in Edinburgh on 14 March 1771. Only son and heir to Dundas and the title. Inherited Melville Castle upon death of Henry Dundas in 1811. Died in 1851.
- Montague, born in April 1772, died in 1837.

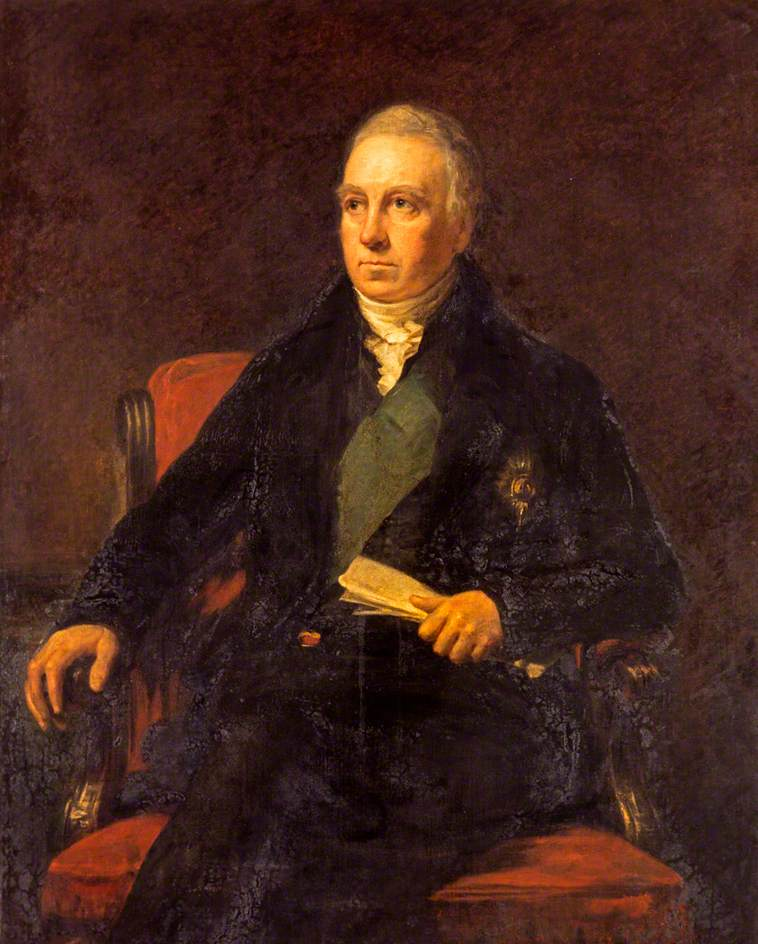
Robert Saunders Dundas, 2nd Viscount Melville, son of Elizabeth Rannie and Henry Dundas

Her portrait was painted by David Martin in 1770; it now belongs to National Galleries Scotland.

== Affair and divorce ==
In October 1778, Rannie took a 10 day tour around East Lothian, stopping to attend a ball at the house of Mr Colt of Aldhame and Hon Mrs Helen Stewart in Musselburgh. Here she was discovered, and later admitted via letter to her husband, to be having an affair with Captain Everard Fawkener, later a lieutenant, of the 11th dragoons (11th Hussars). Rannie then fled to the home of her brother-in-law, Archibald Cockburn.

Her husband filed for divorce and it was granted within five weeks, on 21 November 1778.

As per the laws of the age, as the confessed adulterous party, Elizabeth Rannie forfeited the entire property she had brought into the family, and never saw her children again, then aged between 6 and 12 years old.

== Later life and death ==
Elizabeth and Everard Fawkener were married on 2 December 1778, almost immediately after her divorce from Dundas.

Everard Fawkener was the son of Sir Everard Fawkener, an English merchant who was chiefly known for his friendship to Voltaire. Through his father, Everard Fawkener met with Voltaire in 1774. Through his brother, William Augustus Fawkener, Everard held the civil service post of the Commissioner of Stamps from 1783 until his death in 1803.

Little is known of the marriage between Fawkener and Rannie, except that in 1784 she calls him a ‘brute’. There was no issue and the marriage presumably ends with his death in 1803.

Little is known of the later life of Elizabeth Rannie, except that she never saw her children again and lived a poverty stricken existence. Decades later, her son discovered she was still alive in Cornwall, where she died at the age of 97 in 1847.

== Legacy ==
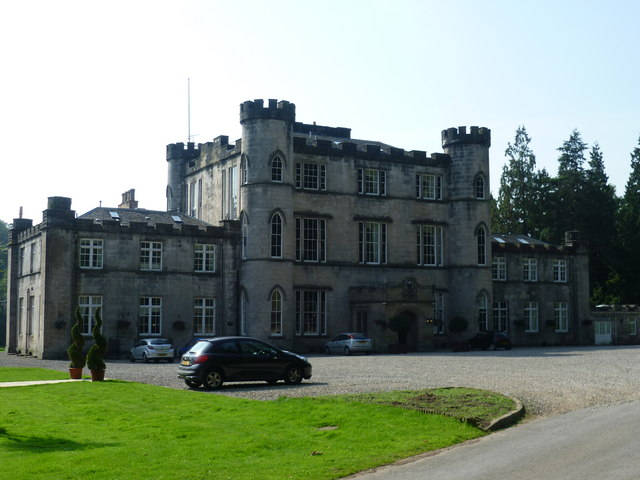
Entrance of Melville Castle

Notable descendants of Elizabeth Rannie, in addition to her son, include grandsons Henry Dundas, 3rd Viscount Melville and Richard Saunders Dundas.

To this day, the peerage of Viscount Melville is descended from Elizabeth Rannie, and takes its name from the castle that Rannie brought into her marriage with Dundas.

Melville castle remained in the Dundas family until the 1980s.

== In popular culture ==
In 2011, BBC Radio Scotland produced a three-part series entitled "Disposable Brides", focussing on bad marriages in Scotland in the 18th century. Narrated by Susan Morrison, episode 2 focussed on Elizabeth Rannie.

In 2020, in the wake of the George Floyd protests, the role of Henry Dundas in abolition was brought to light, and through that commentary appeared in the press on his marriage to then child-bride Elizabeth Rannie.
