= Archibald Cockburn =

Scottish judge

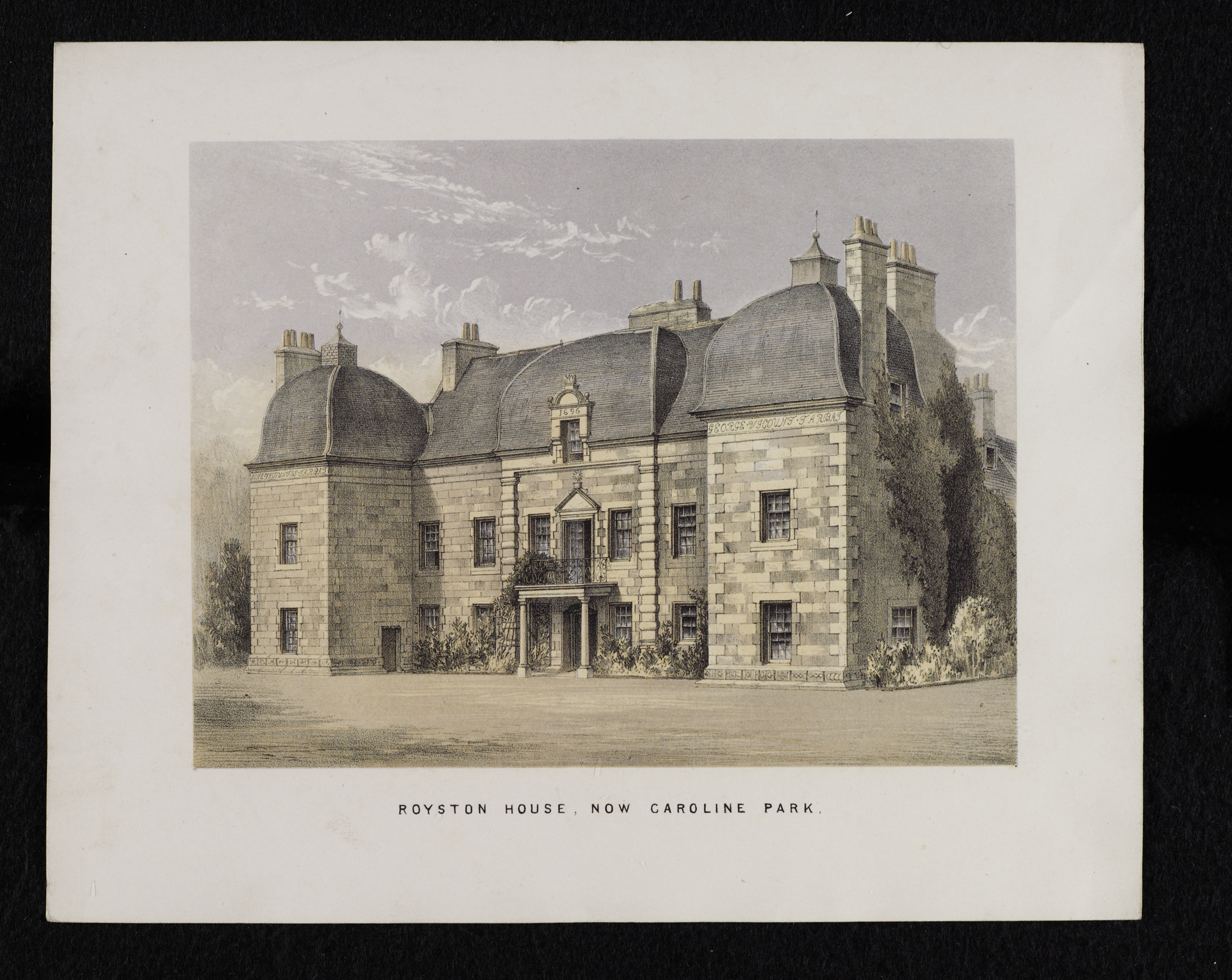
Caroline Park House

Archibald Cockburn (1738 in Edinburgh, Midlothian – 20 June 1820) was a Scottish judge.

He lived at Caroline Park House north of Edinburgh.

== Family ==
Son of Archibald Cockburn of Cockpen and wife (m. 17 August 1735) Martha Dundas, daughter of Robert Dundas of Arniston (died 1727) and wife Margaret Sinclair, daughter of Sir Robert Sinclair of Murkle and Stevenston, 3rd Baronet (1643 - 1713), and first wife (m. Holyroodhouse, Edinburgh, Midlothian, 10 September 1663) Lady Helen Lindsay, daughter of John Lindsay (c. 1611 - Tyninghame, East Lothian, 1678), 17th Earl of Crawford, 1st Earl of Lindsay, 10th Lord Lindsay of the Byres, 1st Lord Parbroath and Hereditary Steward of St Andrews, etc., and wife Lady Margaret Hamilton.

== Biography ==
A keen Tory, he was Sheriff of Edinburgh until 1790, when he succeeded David Stuart Moncrieff as a Baron of the Exchequer.

== Marriage and issue ==
He married at Cockpen, Midlothian, on 25 December 1768 Janet Rennie/Rannie, "connected by marriage with Lord Melville" (sister Elizabeth Rannie, the first wife of Henry Dundas, 1st Viscount Melville), daughter of David Rennie/Rannie of Melville Castle, Edinburgh and had three daughters and six sons:

- Elizabeth Cockburn (Cockpen, Midlothian, 5 November 1770 - 1850) second wife of Thomas Randall Davidson, grandmother of Randall Davidson
- Robert Cockburn (Cockpen, Midlothian, 22 March 1771 - 1844)
- Matilda Cockburn (Cockpen, Midlothian, 7 February 1772 - 1842), married at St Cuthbert's, Edinburgh, Midlothian, on 13 July 1798 to Sir Robert Dundas of Beechwood, 1st Baronet Dundas (30 June 1761 - Heriot Row, Edinburgh, Midlothian, 4 January 1835), and had issue
- Margaret Cockburn (Cockpen, Midlothian, 9 April 1773 - ?)
- George Cockburn (Cockpen, Midlothian, 15 October 1774 - ?)
- Archibald Cockburn (Cockpen, Midlothian, 10 September 1776 - ?)
- David Cockburn (Cockpen, Midlothian, 9 February 1778 - ?)
- Henry Thomas Cockburn of Bonaly, Lord Cockburn (Cockpen, Midlothian, 26 October 1779 - Bonaly, Midlothian, 26 April/18 July 1854)
- Montegue Dundas Cockburn (31 January 1789 – 28 September 1869) was a Scottish coffee planter, and Collector of Salem district (in Madras Presidency, British India) between 1820 and 1829. He was the father of ornithologist and painter Margaret Cockburn.
- John Cockburn (Cockpen, Midlothian, 8 March 1784 - ?), married at Borthwick, Midlothian, on 7 September 1821 to Eliza Dewar, and had two daughters and five sons:
  - Caroline Cockburn (Edinburgh, Midlothian, 19 November 1822 - ?)
  - Archibald David Cockburn (Edinburgh, Midlothian, 6 September 1826 - 1886), married at Edinburgh, Midlothian, on 21 October 1856 to his first cousin Johanna Richardson Cockburn (Edinburgh, Midlothian, 14 January 1831 - 1888), daughter of Henry Thomas Cockburn of Bonaly, Lord Cockburn, and wife Elizabeth Macdowall, and had one son and one daughter:
    - John Cockburn (1858 - 1928), married to Isobel Mary ... (1864 - 1952), and had one son and one daughter:
      - Henry Archibald Cockburn (1873 - 1943)
      - Laela Armine Cockburn (1894 - 1969)
    - Elizabeth Jane Macdowall Cockburn (Edinburgh, Midlothian, 20 August 1866 - ?)
  - Mary Elizabeth Cockburn (Edinburgh, Midlothian, 16 December 1827 - ?)
  - James Graham Cockburn (Edinburgh, Midlothian, 16 June 1829 - ?)
  - John Cockburn (Edinburgh, Midlothian, 31 May 1830 - ?)
  - Henry Alexander Cockburn (Edinburgh, Midlothian, 10 November 1831 - ?), General, married to Lucy Margaret Tucker
  - Alexander Cockburn Cockburn (Edinburgh, Midlothian, 6 July 1833 - ?)
