= Geoffrey de Melville =

Scottish noble

- Noble family: Melville family

Sir Geoffrey de Melville, (Note: Also Galfrid de Melvill or Malevill) Lord of Melville, Sheriff of Edinburgh, Justiciar of Lothian was a 12th-century Scottish noble.

== Life ==
During the reign of King David I (r. 1124–1153), Anglo-Norman knights were invited to settle in Scotland and granted feudal estates. Among them was Geoffrey, whose family originated from the barony of Malleville in the Pays de Caux region of Normandy. Geoffrey named his Midlothian manor Maleville (later anglicized to Melville), establishing the caput baroniae of the barony of Melville on the banks of the River North Esk at Melville Castle.

Melville is known to be acting as Sheriff of Edinburgh in 1153 during the reign of King Malcolm IV of Scotland. Geoffrey was also joint Justiciar of Lothian from 1170 during the reign of King William I of Scotland.

== Marriage and issue ==
His spouse was known at his death as Matilda Malherbe. He is known to have had the following issue:

- Gregory de Melville (died 1178), had issue.
- Phillip de Melville, had issue.
- Geoffrey de Melville
- Thomas de Melville
- Robert de Melville
- Hugh de Melville
- Richard de Melville
- Walter de Melville, had issue.
