= Robert Dundas, 2nd Viscount Melville =

British politician

The Right Honourable The Viscount Melville KT PC FRS
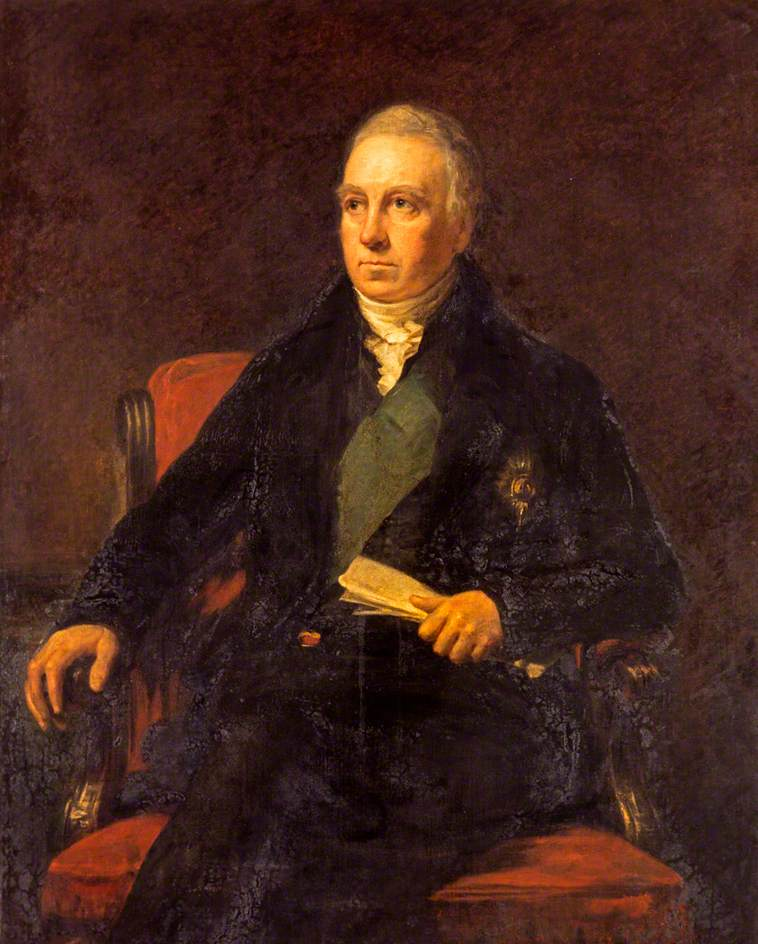

President of the Board of Control
- In office 1807–1809
- Monarch: George III
- Prime Minister: The Duke of Portland
- Preceded by: Thomas Grenville
- Succeeded by: The Lord Harrowby
- In office 1809–1812
- Monarch: George III
- Prime Minister: Hon. Spencer Perceval
- Preceded by: The Lord Harrowby
- Succeeded by: The Earl of Buckinghamshire

Chief Secretary for Ireland
- In office 1809–1809
- Monarch: George III
- Prime Minister: The Duke of Portland
- Preceded by: Hon. Sir Arthur Wellesley
- Succeeded by: Hon. William Wellesley-Pole

First Lord of the Admiralty
- In office 1812–1827
- Monarchs: George III; George IV
- Prime Minister: The Earl of Liverpool
- Preceded by: Charles Philip Yorke
- Succeeded by: The Duke of Clarence (Lord High Admiral)
- In office 1828–1830
- Monarch: George IV
- Prime Minister: The Duke of Wellington
- Preceded by: The Duke of Clarence (Lord High Admiral)
- Succeeded by: Sir James Graham, Bt

Personal details
- Born: 14 March 1771 Edinburgh, Scotland, Kingdom of Great Britain
- Died: 10 June 1851 (aged 80) Melville Castle, Midlothian
- Spouse: Anne Saunders (m. 1796; died 1841)
- Children: 6, including Henry, Richard, and Robert
- Parent(s): Henry Dundas, 1st Viscount Melville; Elizabeth Rannie
- Education: University of Göttingen; University of Edinburgh; Emmanuel College, Cambridge

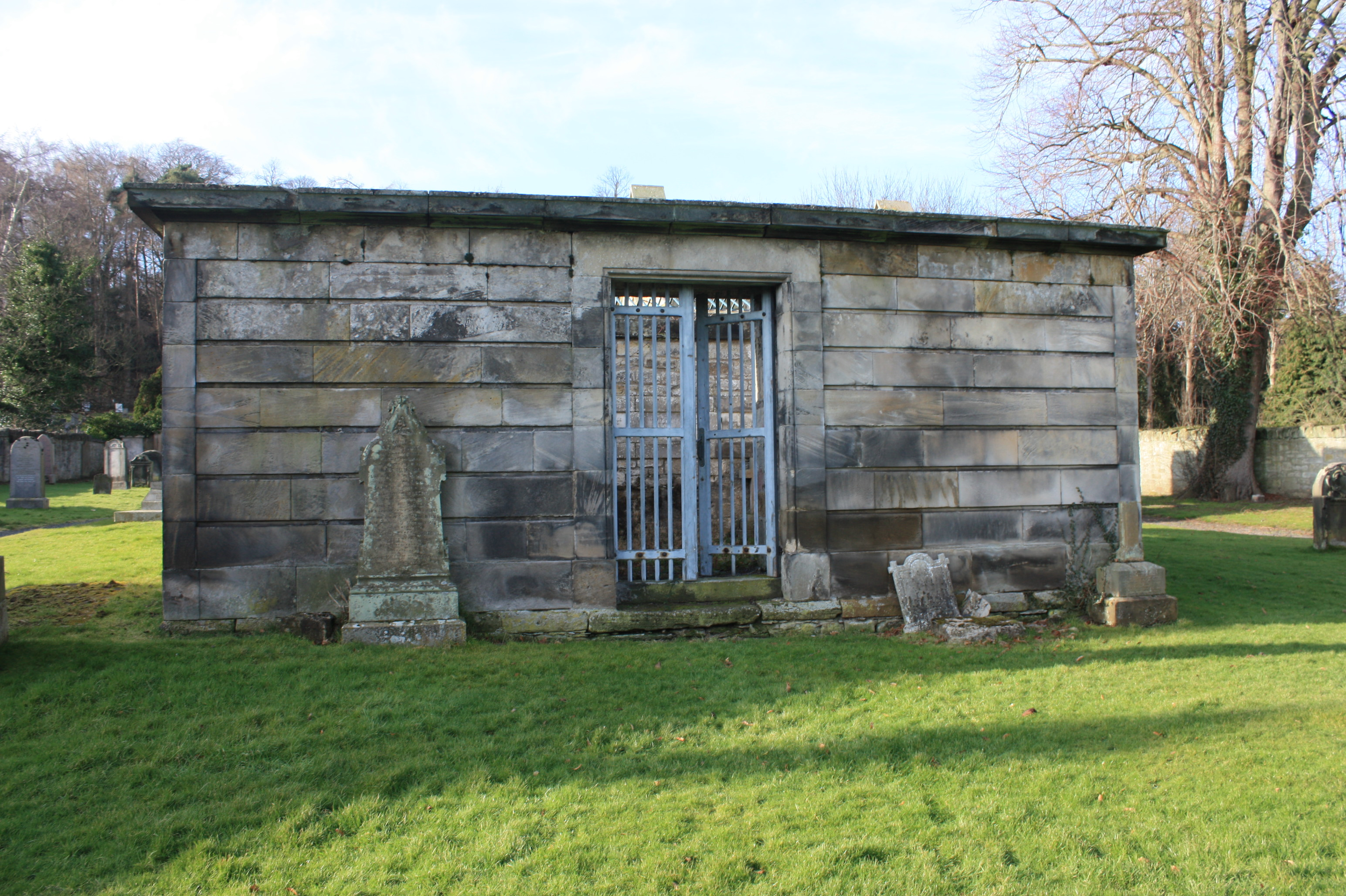
The Dundas Vault in old Lasswade Kirkyard, containing the first five Viscounts Melville

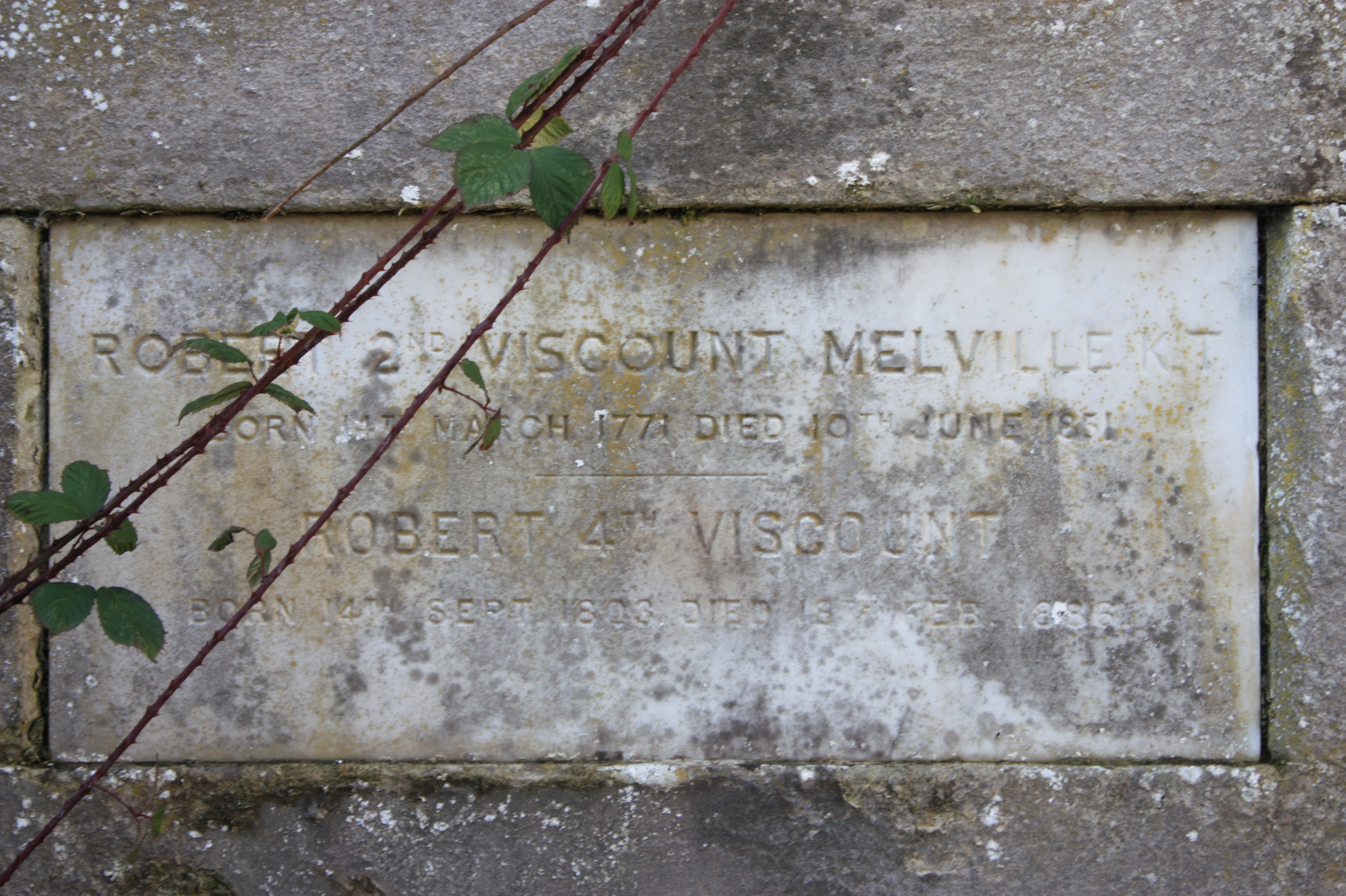
The simple monument to Robert Dundas, 2nd Viscount Melville, Dundas vault, Old Lasswade Kirkyard

Robert Dundas, 2nd Viscount Melville, KT, PC, FRS (14 March 1771 – 10 June 1851) was a British statesman, the son of Henry Dundas, the 1st Viscount. Dundas was the Member of Parliament for Hastings in 1794, Rye in 1796 and Midlothian in 1801. He was also Keeper of the Signet for Scotland from 1800. He was appointed a Privy Counsellor in 1807, a Fellow of the Royal Society in 1817, a Knight of the Thistle in 1821, and was Chancellor of the University of St Andrews from 1814. Melville filled various political offices and was First Lord of the Admiralty from 1812 to 1827 and from 1828 to 1830.

== Early life and family ==
He was born in Edinburgh on 14 March 1771, the only son of Henry Dundas, 1st Viscount Melville, and his first wife, the former Elizabeth Rannie (1751–1843). Educated at the Royal High School, Edinburgh, he went on a continental tour in 1786 with his tutor John Bruce. He enrolled at Göttingen University. He studied afterwards at the University of Edinburgh and at Emmanuel College, Cambridge. He was admitted at Lincoln's Inn in 1788. After a successful attempt at law he became his father's private secretary from 1794, though he was brought in as MP for Hastings in 1794, and then Rye in 1796. The same year, on 29 August, he married an heiress, Anne Saunders (died 10 Sept 1841), and took her name beside his own. They had four sons and two daughters; their eldest son, Henry Dundas, later third Viscount Melville, became an army officer while their second son, Richard Saunders Dundas, became First Naval Lord.

== President of the Board of Control ==
Dundas was appointed Keeper of the Signet for Scotland and elected MP for Midlothian (Edinburghshire) in 1801. He remained silent in parliament until his speeches of 1805 and 1806 in defence of his father, who was then being impeached. His first real test came in negotiating to be left in charge of Scotland by a hostile 'ministry of all the talents'. He got nowhere, but won the respect of his own side, and the problem vanished with the ministry's collapse. He was rewarded with the presidency of the Board of Control for India by the Duke of Portland in 1807.

Dundas's main task was to frustrate any possibility that Napoleon might exploit his alliance with Russia to make some attempt on British India. He sent a mission to the shah of Persia, at whose court French agents were present. He formed alliances with the princes of Lahore and Kabul. He ordered the occupation of the Portuguese factories in India and China, of the Dutch colony of Java, and of the French stations on Mauritius and Réunion. He had also to deal with a sharp deterioration, through loss of trade during the war, in the finances of the East India Company. A series of reports on its development since the East India Company Act 1784 (24 Geo. 3. Sess. 2. c. 25), written by a select committee which he chaired, concluded that it should give up its inefficient trading privileges, at least in the subcontinent. Dundas drafted the legislation which ended them at the renewal of the company's charter in 1813.

Dundas's Indian administration was interrupted for six months in 1809 when he served as Chief Secretary for Ireland. Spencer Perceval, succeeding Portland, then wanted to promote him to the cabinet as secretary for war, but this did not happen due to the wishes of his father. Dundas returned to the Board of Control, still without a place in cabinet. He succeeded as Viscount Melville on 27 May 1811. Two months later, he was appointed Keeper of the Privy Seal of Scotland in place of his father. The next year, under Prime Minister Lord Liverpool, he was promoted First Lord of the Admiralty.

== Admiralty ==
While the Napoleonic wars went on, his job was to maintain the British maritime supremacy established at the battle of Trafalgar. In a state paper of February 1813 he pointed out that France, with the shipbuilding resources of the Netherlands and Italy at her disposal, would be able to construct a fleet to match Britain's if the struggle continued much longer. The point was underlined by complaints from the Duke of Wellington in Spain of inadequate protection for the convoys supplying him, especially after the outbreak of hostilities with the United States in 1812 unleashed hordes of American privateers on the Atlantic.

Drastic cuts followed the eventual peace, but Britain, now the only colonial power of any importance, found her maritime commitments increased. Melville did not think the fleet could be reduced much below 100 ships of the line. The cabinet set a limit of forty-four. The following years saw a constant struggle by Melville to find every possible economy while he avoided meeting a target he regarded as unreal. He quietly got his way, not least by improving the design and durability of ships, research on which benefited from his close personal interest. Yet he resisted the introduction of steamers, since an infant technology seemed bound to prove expensive and unreliable; moreover, if navies were to be rebuilt all round as steam driven, Britain would place herself on the same level as her rivals. By the late 1820s he was able to authorise the construction of new and larger classes of ship, matching those in France and the United States. Even out of tight budgets he never failed to squeeze something for another scientific interest, in exploration (where places are named after him, see below).

== Scotland ==
Appointed a governor of the Bank of Scotland, he was elected chancellor of the University of St Andrews in 1814, and made a Knight of the Thistle in 1821. The crisis of the system came in 1827 on the resignation of Liverpool and the succession of George Canning, who was set on Catholic emancipation. Melville said that, while he personally supported it, he could not approve of a policy which would split the outgoing cabinet. The Whigs in Canning's coalition now persuaded him that a Scottish manager was unnecessary; the home secretary could do all the work with a native adviser or two.

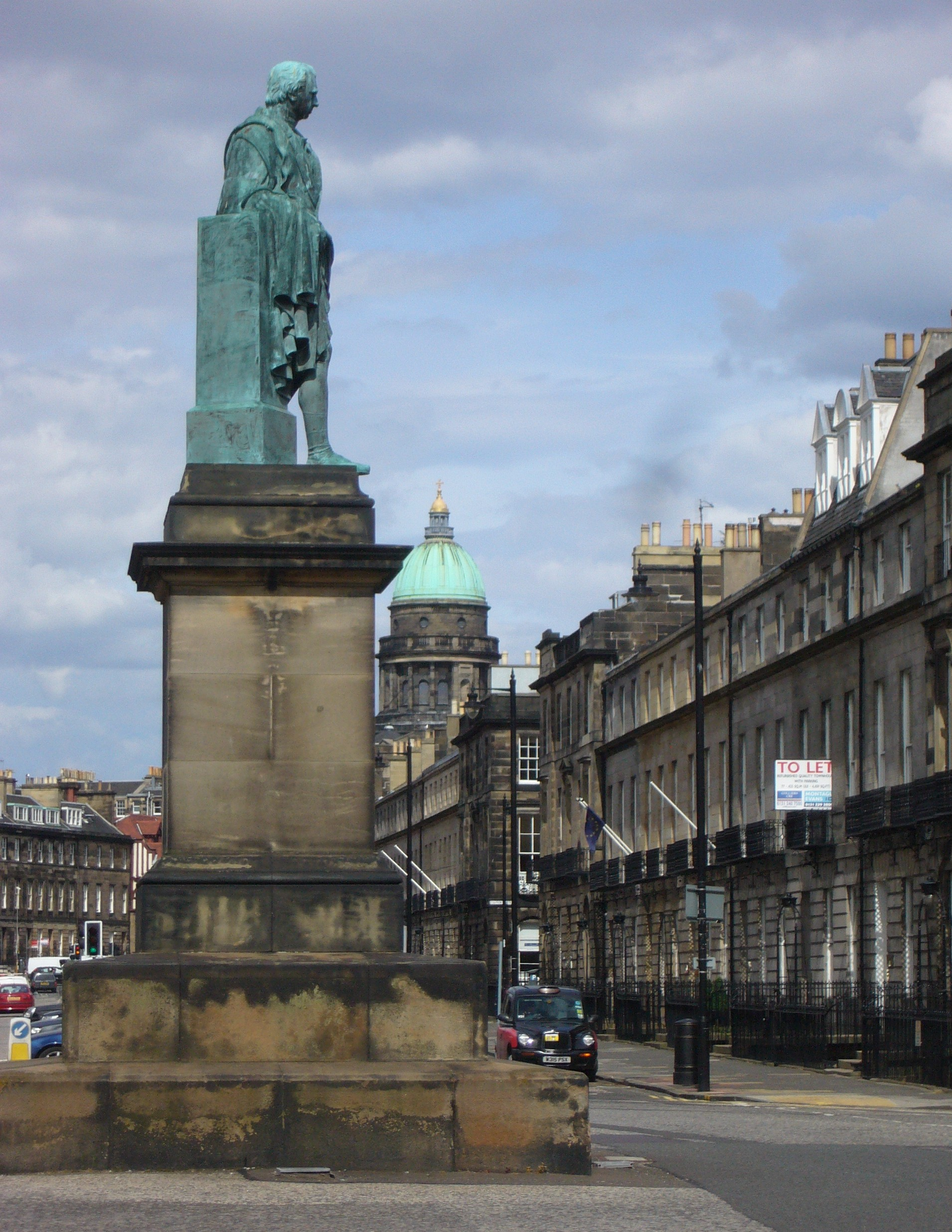
Statue in Melville Street, Edinburgh

== First Lord of the Admiralty ==
The old governing interest in Scotland began to break up, a process which did not halt when Melville returned under Wellington and Sir Robert Peel as President of the Board of Control in 1828, then again at the Admiralty as First Lord of the Admiralty. The Reform Act would anyway end the arrangements under which the Dundases had ruled Scotland. Melville resigned in 1830, never to hold office again. But he made himself useful in good works, notably chairmanship of the royal commission which in 1845 proposed reform of the Scots poor law.

He died on 10 June 1851 at Melville Castle, and was buried in the family vault built for his father, in the Old Kirk, Lasswade, Edinburghshire, on 17 June.

His title passed to his eldest son Henry Dundas.

== Arms ==
Coat of arms of Robert Dundas, 2nd Viscount Melville
Crest A lion's head affronteé Gules struggling through an oak bush all Proper. Escutcheon Argent a lion rampant Gules within a bordure Azure charged with three boars' heads couped Or two in chief and one in base. Supporters Dexter a leopard reguardant, sinister a stag, both Proper. Motto Essayez (top); Quod Potui Perfecti (bottom)

== Place names ==
His name is perpetuated by that of Melville Sound and Melville Island, Canada because of his interest in Arctic exploration. Melville Island in the Northern Territory of Australia was also named for him, by explorer Phillip Parker King. Melville Bay in Greenland was named in his honour as well. He also gives his name to Melville Street in the New Town area of Edinburgh, Scotland, and a large statue of him by Sir John Steell stands in the central square of this street. The locality of Melville in Perth, Western Australia is also named after him as well as Melville Street in Hobart, Tasmania.

Parliament of Great Britain
Preceded by Sir Richard Arden; John Stanley	Member of Parliament for Hastings; 1794–1796; With: John Stanley	Succeeded by Sir James Sanderson, Bt; Nicholas Vansittart
Preceded by Charles Long; Lord Hawkesbury	Member of Parliament for Rye; 1796–1800; With: Lord Hawkesbury	Succeeded by Lord Hawkesbury; The Lord de Blaquiere
Parliament of the United Kingdom
Preceded by Robert Dundas	Member of Parliament for Midlothian; 1801 – 1811	Succeeded by Sir George Clerk, Bt
Political offices
Preceded by Thomas Grenville	President of the Board of Control; 1807–1809	Succeeded by The Lord Harrowby
Preceded by Hon. Sir Arthur Wellesley	Chief Secretary for Ireland; 1809	Succeeded by Hon. William Wellesley-Pole
Preceded by The Lord Harrowby	President of the Board of Control; 1809–1812	Succeeded by The Earl of Buckinghamshire
Preceded by Charles Philip Yorke	First Lord of the Admiralty; 1812–1827	Succeeded by The Duke of Clarence (Lord High Admiral)
Preceded by The Duke of Clarence (Lord High Admiral)	First Lord of the Admiralty; 1828–1830	Succeeded by Sir James Graham, Bt
Honorary titles
Preceded by The Viscount Melville	Keeper of the Privy Seal of Scotland; 1811–1851	Succeeded by Fox Maule
Academic offices
Preceded by The Duke of Cambridge	Chancellor of the University of St Andrews; 1814–1851	Succeeded by The Duke of Argyll
Peerage of the United Kingdom
Preceded by Henry Dundas	Viscount Melville; 1811–1851	Succeeded by Henry Dundas
