= Dunira, Perthshire =

Coordinates: 56.38867°N 4.045746°W

Dunira
- Location within Perth and Kinross
- OS grid reference: NN738237
- Council area: Perth and Kinross
- Lieutenancy area: Perth and Kinross
- Country: Scotland
- Sovereign state: United Kingdom
- Post town: Crieff
- Postcode district: PH6
- Dialling code: 01764
- Police: Scotland
- Fire: Scottish
- Ambulance: Scottish
- UK Parliament: Perth and Kinross-shire
- Scottish Parliament: Perth; Mid Scotland and Fife

Designations

Inventory of Gardens and Designed Landscapes in Scotland
- Official name: Dunira
- Designated: 1 July 1987
- Reference no.: GDL00156

Dunira (Scottish Gaelic: Dùn Iar) is an estate of about 350 hectares (860 acres) in Perthshire, Scotland, 3 miles (5 kilometres) northwest of Comrie and 25 mi (40 km) northwest of Stirling. The estate is set against a backdrop of mountains, hills and rich lush lowland. Dunira was the home of Henry Dundas, 1st Viscount Melville, although the house he built was replaced in the 19th century. The replacement house burned down in 1948, although the estate is still active.

== Etymology ==
The name Dunira comes from the Scottish Gaelic Dùn Iarath, meaning "hillfort at the west ford".

== History ==
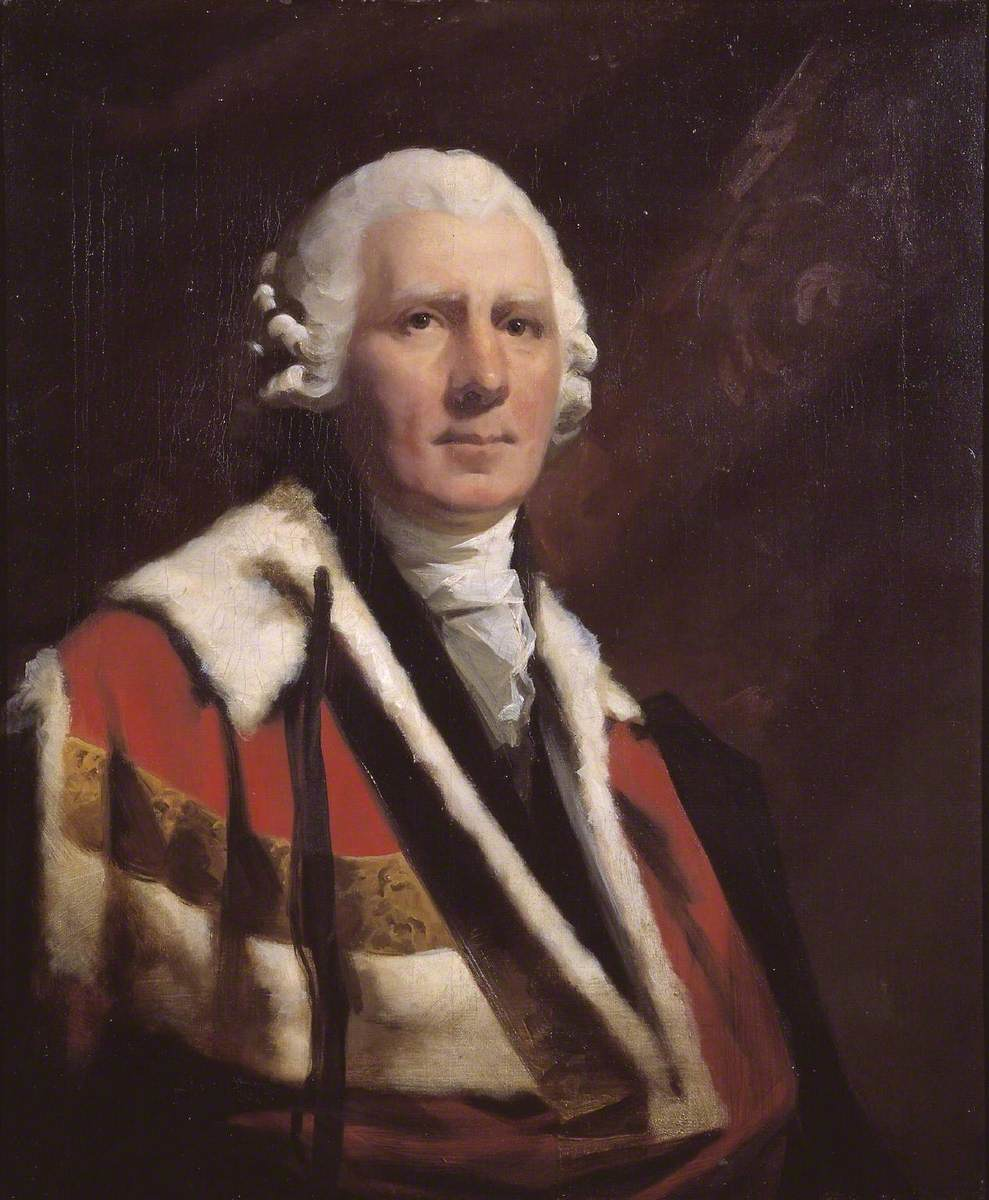
Henry Dundas, 1st Viscount Melville

The politician Henry Dundas (28 April 1742 – 28 May 1811) bought the 20,000-acre (8,100 ha) estate in 1784. Dundas commissioned a design for a new house from architect Henry Holland in 1798, although the house that was built between 1803 and 1808 was the work of William Stirling. The surrounding parkland was laid out by Dundas, possibly with input from Holland. In 1802, Dundas was elevated to the Peerage of the United Kingdom as Viscount Melville and Baron Dunira.

The estate was sold in 1824 to Sir Robert Dundas of Beechwood. His son Sir David Dundas had the house, which flooded regularly, demolished and rebuilt to the design of William Burn, who also constructed the terraces. In 1864, David Bryce designed additions to the house. Dundas had established a pinetum by the late-19th century, and other improvements were made across the estate.

The Dundas family sold Dunira some time before 1920. The new owner was William Gilchrist Macbeth, who commissioned Thomas Mawson, a landscape gardener, to redesign the gardens in the early 1920s. During the Second World War, the house was used as a military convalescent hospital. Most of the house was destroyed by a fire in 1948 leaving the office court standing. This was used as a residence until demolished in 2005. In 2000, the Thomas Mawson garden was partially restored as part of the Channel 4 television programme Lost Gardens.

== Current status and use ==
The estate was listed on the Inventory of Gardens and Designed Landscapes in Scotland, the national listing of historic parks, by Historic Scotland in 1987.

The estate is currently used for shooting game, stalking, fishing and golf with a variety of holiday accommodation and facilities for the family but the estate is not open to general public access.
