= Henry Dundas, 3rd Viscount Melville =

British Army officer

General The Right Honourable The Viscount Melville GCB
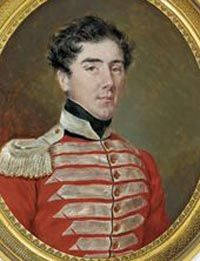
- Born: 25 February 1801
- Died: 1 February 1876 (aged 74)
- Military career
- Allegiance: United Kingdom
- Branch: British Army
- Rank: General
- Commands: Commander-in-Chief, Scotland
- Conflicts: Rebellions of 1837–1838; Battle of the Windmill; Second Anglo-Sikh War; Siege of Multan; Battle of Gujrat
- Awards: Knight Grand Cross of the Order of the Bath

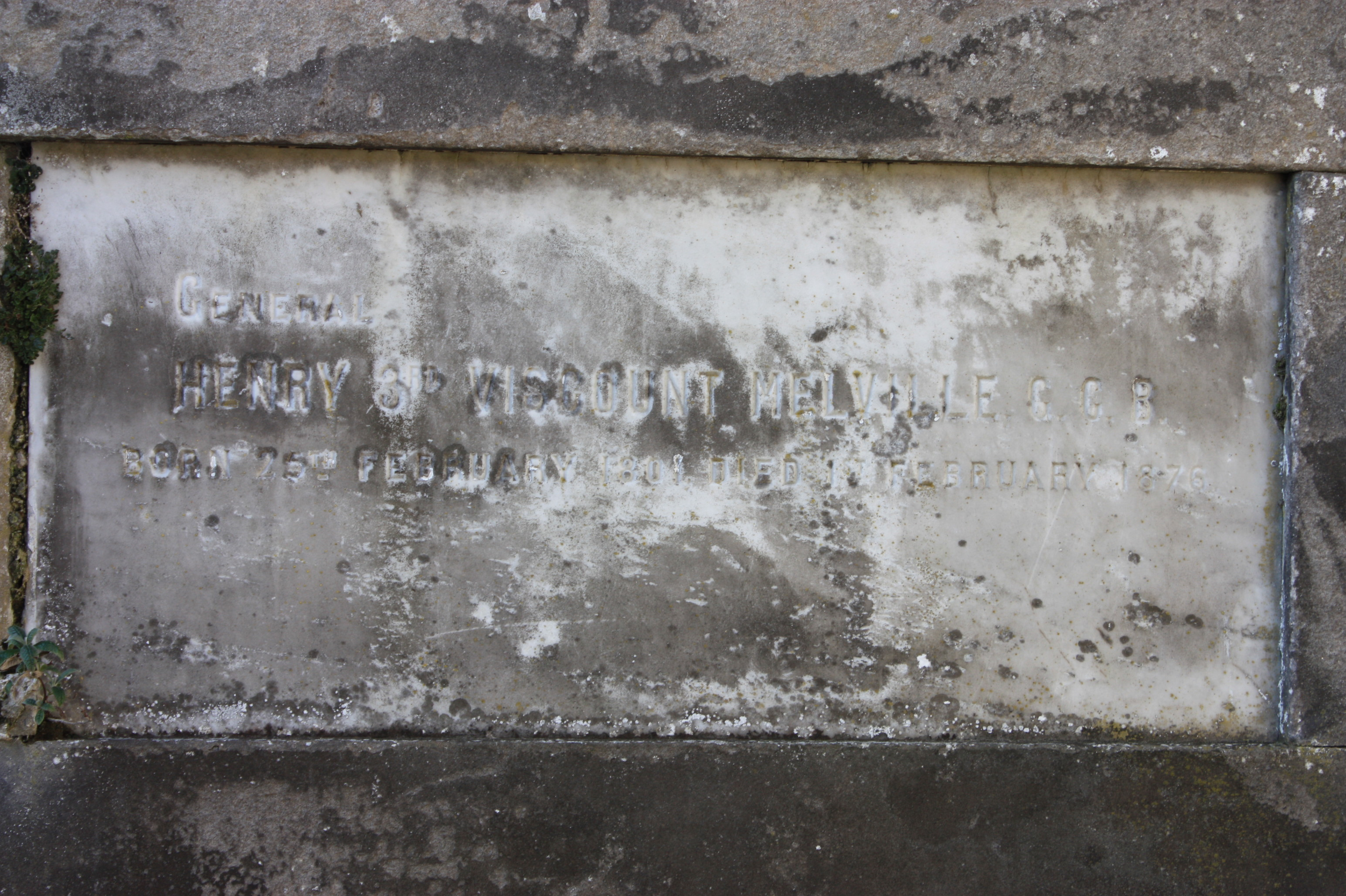
The grave of General Henry Dundas, 3rd Viscount Melville, Dundas Vault, Old Lasswade Kirkyard

General Henry Dundas, 3rd Viscount Melville, GCB (25 February 1801 – 1 February 1876) was a British Army officer.

== Military career ==
The eldest son of Robert Dundas, 2nd Viscount Melville, and his wife Anne, Dundas joined the Army as a lieutenant in the 3rd (or Scots) Guards in 1819. He was promoted to captain of the 83rd Regiment in 1824, major in 1826 and lieutenant-colonel in 1829. In 1837 he was active in suppressing the Canadian rebellion at the Battle of the Windmill, after which he was appointed colonel and aide-de-camp to Queen Victoria in 1841.

He played a distinguished part in India as a brigadier-general in 1848–49, chosen to command the column sent from Bombay to co-operate with Lord Gough's army in the Second Anglo-Sikh War. He was second in command at the capture of Multan and then joined the main army with his force for the battle of Gujrat.

He returned to England in 1850 and became 3rd Viscount Melville on his father's death in 1851. He became Commander-in-Chief, Scotland in 1854 remaining in that post until 1860, in which year he was made Governor of Edinburgh Castle. He was raised to the rank of general in 1868.

He died unmarried at Melville Castle, near Edinburgh in 1876. He is buried in the simple Dundas Vault in Old Lasswade Kirkyard, together with his ancestors and descendants.

His younger brother, Richard Saunders Dundas, was a prominent naval officer.

He was succeeded as Viscount Melville by his brother Robert.

== Parliament ==
He was a Member of Parliament (MP) for Rochester from 1826 to 1830, and for Winchelsea from 1830 to 1831.

== Arms ==
Coat of arms of Henry Dundas, 3rd Viscount Melville
Crest A lion's head affronteé Gules struggling through an oak bush all Proper. Escutcheon Argent a lion rampant Gules within a bordure Azure charged with three boars' heads couped Or two in chief and one in base. Supporters Dexter a leopard reguardant, sinister a stag, both Proper. Motto Essayez (top); Quod Potui Perfecti (bottom)

Parliament of the United Kingdom
Preceded by Lord Binning; Ralph Bernal	Member of Parliament for Rochester; 1826–1830; With: Ralph Bernal	Succeeded by Lord Villiers; Ralph Bernal
Preceded by Viscount Howick; John Williams	Member of Parliament for Winchelsea; 1830–1831; With: John Williams	Succeeded by Stephen Lushington; John Williams
Military offices
Preceded by Sir Thomas Napier	Commander-in-Chief, Scotland; 1854–1860	Succeeded by Sir Duncan Cameron
Preceded by Sir Thomas Napier	Governor of Edinburgh Castle; 1855–1876	Vacant Title next held by Sir Archibald Cameron
Preceded by Sir John Eardley Inglis	Colonel of the 32nd (The Cornwall) Regiment of Foot (Light Infantry); 1862–1863	Succeeded by Sir George Brown
Preceded by Joseph Paterson	Colonel of the 60th Regiment of Foot; 1863–1876	Succeeded by Sir Arthur Cunynghame
Peerage of the United Kingdom
Preceded by Robert Dundas	Viscount Melville; 1851–1876	Succeeded by Robert Dundas
