= Thomas Randall Davidson =

Scottish minister and landowner

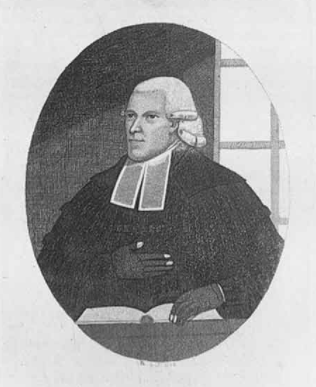
Rev Thomas Randall Davidson by John Kay

Thomas Randall Davidson (1747–1827) was a Church of Scotland minister and landowner.

== Life ==
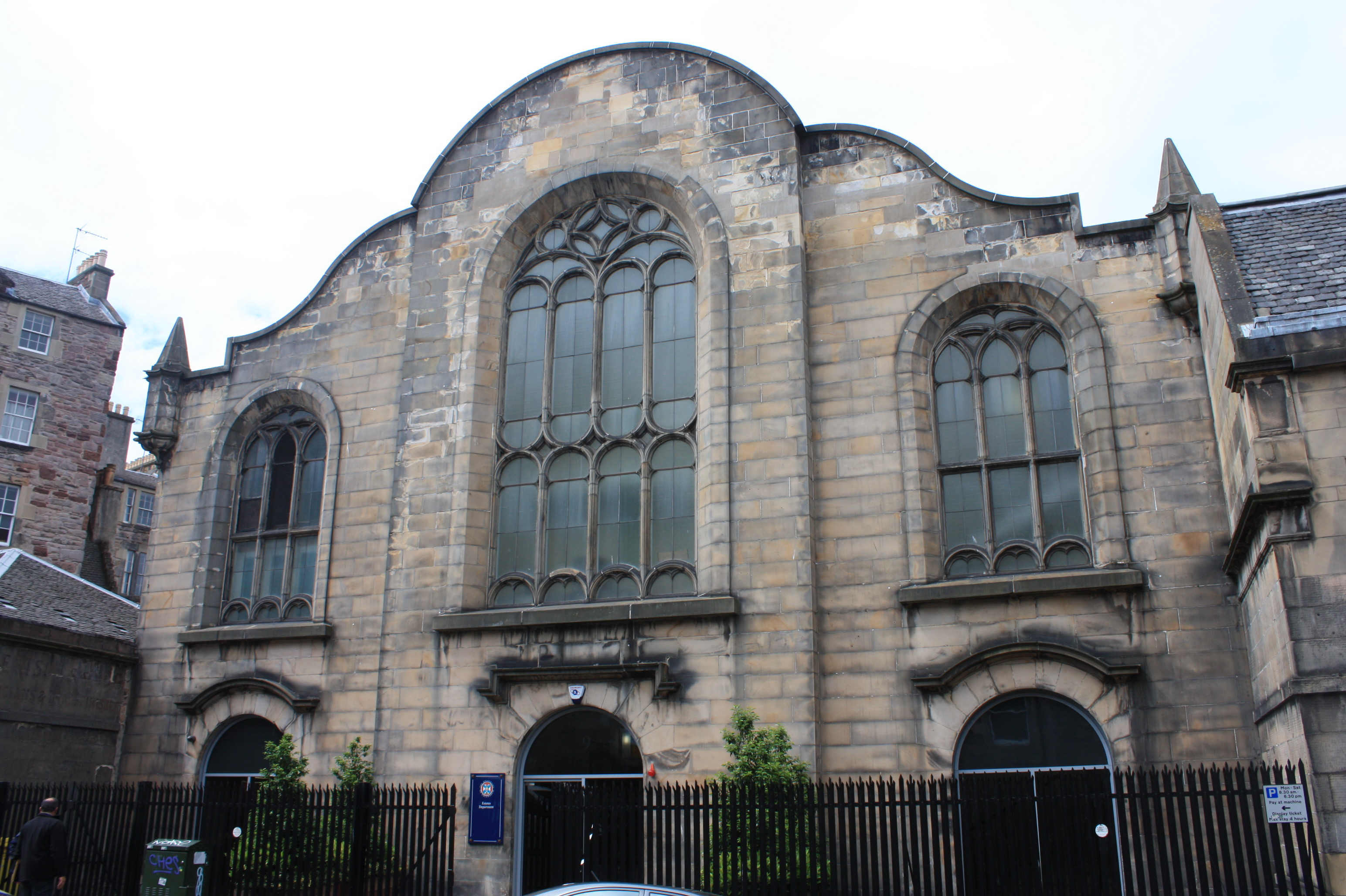
Lady Yester's Church

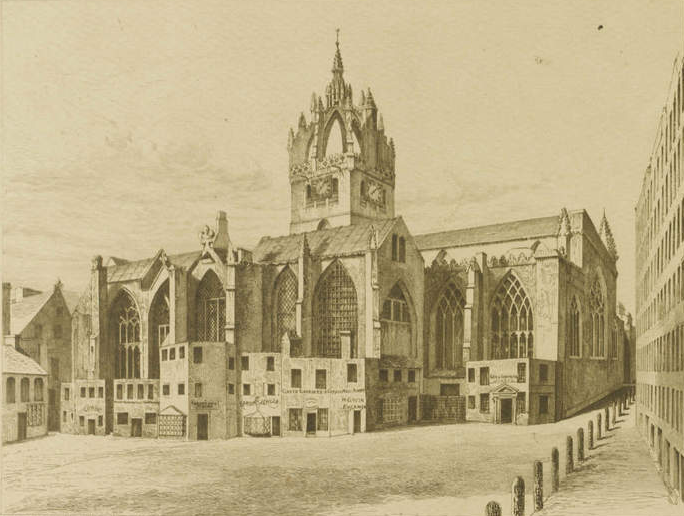
St Giles' from the south c. 1700

He was born Thomas Randall in July 1747, the son of Rev Thomas Randall (b.1710), minister of Inchture west of Dundee. Early education was at least in part at a college in Glasgow. His family had strong Dutch connections and he studied at the University of Leyden. He was licensed to preach as a Presbyterian minister by the authorities in Rotterdam in June 1769. He preached a little in Amsterdam.

In 1771 he returned to his home town of Inchture to replace his father as parish minister of Inchture, his father having translated to Stirling. In 1773 he translated to the "Outer High" Church in Glasgow. In November 1778 he translated to Lady Yester's Church in Edinburgh in place of Rev James MacKnight.

In 1785 he succeeded Rev Alexander Webster as minister of Tolbooth Parish: one of the four parishes contained within St Giles Cathedral. His writings began attracting international attention and Harvard University in the USA awarded him an honorary Doctor of Divinity in 1793.

In 1794, on the death of his maternal uncle, William Davidson, who had died without an heir, Thomas inherited the mansion and estate of Muirhouse just north of Edinburgh, and viewing over the Firth of Forth. Apart from this "country house" he also had a town house at 87 Princes Street, a newly finished house in Edinburgh's First New Town.

Over and above his Muirhouse estate he owned the estate of Old Barony in Hatton and a fine Edinburgh townhouse at 8 Heriot Row. The author Henry Mackenzie was a close neighbour.

He died at Muirhouse on 25 October 1827. His funeral service in St Giles was overseen by Rev George Muirhead. He was buried on 28 October. He was the final minister of Tolbooth parish as contained in St Giles and after his death it moved to a purpose built Tolbooth Church on Castlehill to the west.

== Family ==
In January 1772 he married Christian Rutherford (d.1797) daughter of John Rutherford of Edgerston. Their children included:

- Sarah Randall (d.1773)
- Mary Randall (d.1776)
- William Randall (1783-1865) later known as William Davidson of Muirhouse

Following Christian's death in 1797, in August 1798 he married Elizabeth Cockburn (1770-1850), daughter of Archibald Cockburn, Baron of the Exchequer, and sister of Henry Cockburn, Lord Cockburn. She was 23 years his junior. Their children included:

- Jane Davidson (b.1800)
- Elizabeth Davidson (b.1802)
- Thomas (1803-1811)
- Archibald Davidson (1805-1886) Sheriff of Lothian
- David Davidson (1808-1891) Treasurer of the Bank of Scotland
- Henry Davidson (1811-1889) father of Randall Davidson the Archbishop of Canterbury

== Publications ==
- A Sketch of the Character of Dr John Erskine (1803)
