= David Stuart Moncreiff =

David Stuart Moncreiff of Moredun FRSE (1710-1790) was an 18th-century Scottish advocate, landowner and agricultural improver. In 1783 he was a joint founder of the Royal Society of Edinburgh. His name is occasionally given as David Stewart Moncreiff. David Hume appears to occasionally have written under his name. As they clearly were acquainted this appears mischievous rather than a nom de plume.

== Life ==
He was born in Perthshire on 8 September 1710 the second son of Sir Thomas Moncreiffe, 2nd Baronet (d.1738) and his wife, Margaret Smythe.

Trained as a lawyer he qualified as an advocate in 1736. In 1743 he became a Deputy King's Remembrancer to the Exchequer and Secretary of Scottish Affairs to the Prince of Wales. In 1766 he became Solicitor of Taxes for Scotland.

In 1769 he demolished the former mansion of Goodtrees (originally given a more Germanic spelling of Gut-Tres) and built a new mansion which he called Moredun in memory of a hill on his Perthshire estate. Moredun House was acquired in 1923 to convert into a convalescent home for ex-servicemen but was instead demolished and a new facility created known as the Murray Homes.

In 1781 he succeeded John Maule as a Baron of the Exchequer alongside other notables such as Cosmo Gordon. On his death he was succeeded in this role by Archibald Cockburn.

He died at Moredun on 17 April 1790 and was buried in the Chapel Royal at Holyrood Abbey. He did not marry and had no children.
