= Clan Melville =

Scottish clan

- Motto: Denique Coelum (Heaven at Last)
- Clan Melville no longer has a chief, and is an armigerous clan

Clan Melville is a Lowland Scottish clan. The clan does not currently have a chief and is therefore considered an Armigerous clan registered with the Lyon Court.

== History ==
The name is derived from the barony of Maleville, in the Pays de Caux region of Normandy, France. Guillaume de Malleville was a companion of William, Duke of Normandy, at the Battle of Hastings in 1066. During the reign of King David I of Scotland, the Melville family were granted lands in Midlothian, which the lands and barony were then named after them.

== Castles ==
The following is a list of castles known to have been in the ownership of the family.

- Melville Castle, Midlothian (ancestral seat)
- Melville House, Fife (former home of Lord Meville and Earl of Melville)
- Glenferness House, Highland (current home of Earl of Leven/Earl of Melville)
