= Henry Dundas, 1st Viscount Melville =

British politician (1742–1811)

The Right Honourable The Viscount Melville PC FRSE
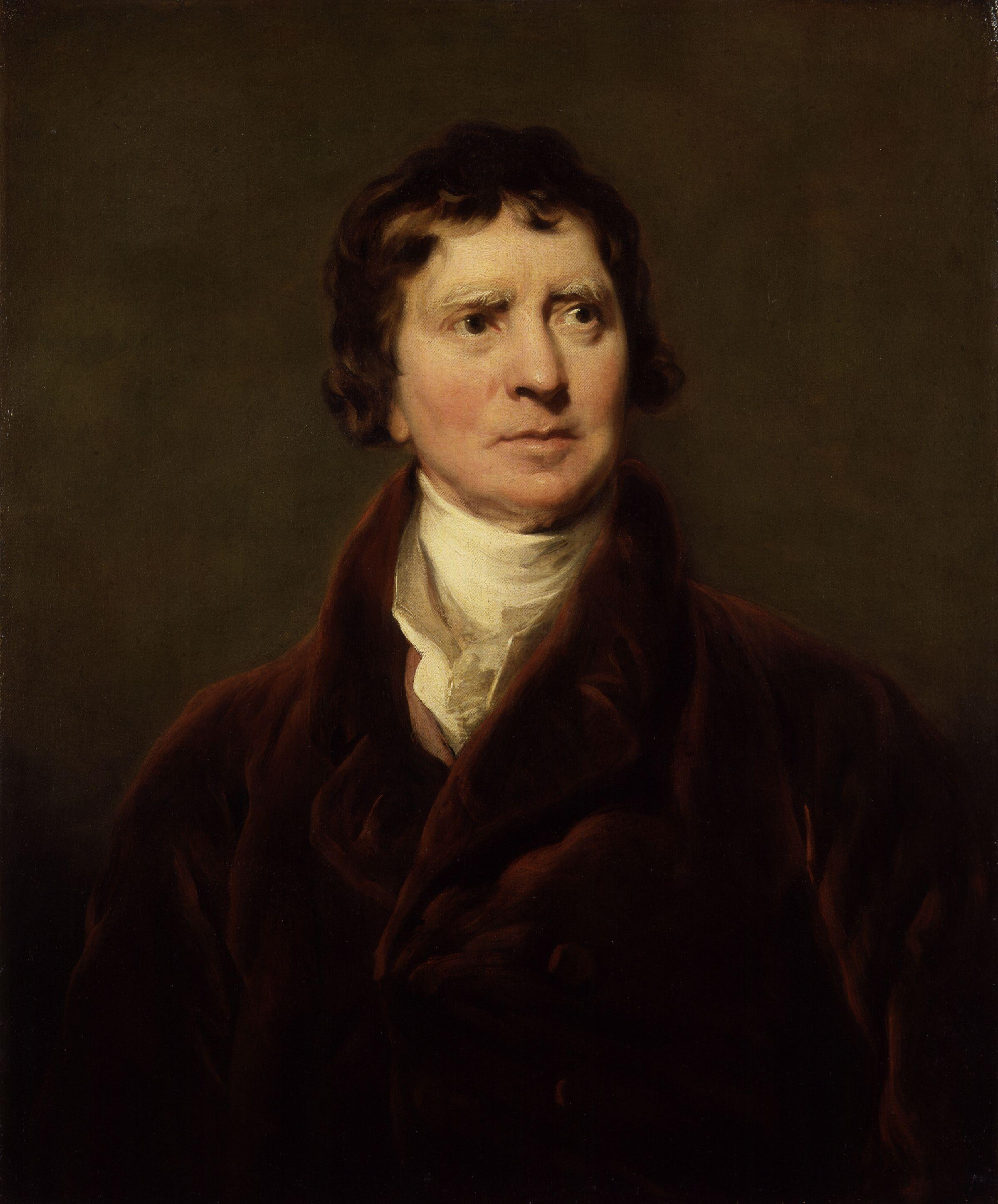
- Portrait by Sir Thomas Lawrence, c. 1810

First Lord of the Admiralty
- In office May 1804 – May 1805
- Monarch: George III
- Prime Minister: William Pitt the Younger
- Preceded by: The Earl of St. Vincent
- Succeeded by: The Lord Barham

Secretary of State for War
- In office July 1794 – March 1801
- Monarch: George III
- Prime Minister: William Pitt
- Preceded by: Office established
- Succeeded by: Lord Hobart

President of the Board of Control
- In office June 1793 – May 1801
- Monarch: George III
- Prime Minister: Pitt; Henry Addington
- Preceded by: The Lord Grenville
- Succeeded by: Viscount Lewisham

Home Secretary
- In office 8 June 1791 – 11 July 1794
- Monarch: George III
- Prime Minister: Pitt
- Preceded by: The Lord Grenville
- Succeeded by: The Duke of Portland

Lord Advocate
- In office 24 May 1775 – August 1783
- Monarch: George III
- Prime Minister: Lord North; The Marquess of Rockingham; The Earl of Shelburne; The Duke of Portland
- Preceded by: Sir James Montgomery
- Succeeded by: Henry Erskine

Member of Parliament for Edinburgh
- In office 1790–1802
- Preceded by: Sir Adam Fergusson
- Succeeded by: Charles Hope

Personal details
- Born: 28 April 1742 Edinburgh, Scotland
- Died: 28 May 1811 (aged 69) Edinburgh, Scotland
- Party: Independent Whig
- Spouses: Elizabeth Rannie (m. 1765; div. 1778); Lady Jane Hope (m. 1793)
- Children: Robert Dundas, 2nd Viscount Melville
- Parents: Robert Dundas of Arniston; Anne Gordon
- Education: University of Edinburgh

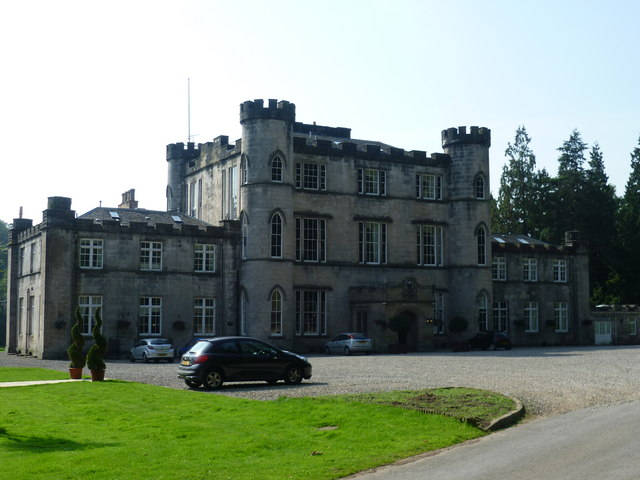
Melville Castle, home of Henry Dundas

Henry Dundas, 1st Viscount Melville, PC, FRSE (28 April 1742 – 28 May 1811), styled as Lord Melville from 1802, was a British politician who served as Home Secretary from 1791 to 1794 and First Lord of the Admiralty from 1804 to 1805. He was instrumental in the encouragement of the Scottish Enlightenment, in the prosecution of the war against France, and in the expansion of British influence in India.

Prime Minister William Pitt appointed him Lord of Trade (1784–1786), Home Secretary (1791–1794), President of the Board of Control for Indian Affairs (1793–1801), War Secretary (1794–1801) and First Lord of the Admiralty (1804–1805). As a political boss, Dundas' deft and almost absolute power over Scottish politics during a long period in which no monarch visited the country led to him being nicknamed "King Harry the Ninth", the "Grand Manager of Scotland" (a play on the masonic office of Grand Master of Scotland), and "The Uncrowned King of Scotland".

Dundas remains a controversial figure over his amendment to a motion for abolition of the Atlantic slave trade, which called for gradual abolition, in order to ensure its passage in the House of Commons. At that time, the leaders of the abolitionist movement sought an immediate end to the slave trade, while the West India Interest opposed any abolition at all.

== Background and education ==
Dundas was born in Edinburgh on 28 April 1742 in the house known as 'Bishop's Land' (a former lodging of the Archbishop of St Andrews) on the Royal Mile. He was the fourth son of Robert Dundas of Arniston, Lord President of the Court of Session, by his second wife, Anne Gordon, daughter of Sir William Gordon of Invergordon. He first attended Dalkeith Grammar School before an attack of smallpox interrupted his studies, after which he moved to the Royal High School, Edinburgh, before enrolling at the University of Edinburgh to study law.

While a student, he was a member of the Edinburgh University Belles Lettres Society, participating in its meetings and gaining his first experience of public speaking at the society's debates.

== Legal career ==
Dundas set up his legal offices at the head of Fleshmarket Close on the Royal Mile.

Becoming a member of the Faculty of Advocates in 1763, he soon acquired a leading position in the Scottish legal system. He became Solicitor General for Scotland in 1766; but after his appointment as Lord Advocate in 1775, he gradually relinquished his legal practice to devote his attention more exclusively to public affairs.

From 1776–78, Dundas acted as counsel to an escaped slave, Joseph Knight, who had been purchased in Jamaica and later taken to Scotland. As a young man Knight tried to escape from his owner, and when that failed he launched a legal battle for his freedom. The case went to Scotland's highest civil court, where Dundas led Knight's legal team, in the case of Knight v. Wedderburn. Dundas was assisted by prominent members of the Scottish Enlightenment, and also the writer Samuel Johnson, whose biographer James Boswell later wrote: "I cannot too highly praise the speech which Mr. Henry Dundas generously contributed to the cause of the sooty stranger. ...And I do declare, that upon this memorable question he impressed me, and I believe all his audience, with such feelings as were produced by some of the most eminent orations of antiquity. ." Dundas argued that "as Christianity gained ground in different nations, slavery was abolished", and, noting an earlier anti-slavery ruling in Somerset v Stewart in England, Dundas said "he hoped for the honour of Scotland, that the supreme Court of this country would not be the only court that would give its sanction to so barbarous a claim." Dundas concluded his remarks by stating: "Human nature, my Lords, spurns at the thought of slavery among any part of our species." His pleading in Scotland's highest court was successful, and the Court ruled: "the dominion assumed over this Negro, under the law of Jamaica, being unjust, could not be supported in this country to any extent". The result was a landmark decision that declared that no person could be a slave on Scottish soil. Michael Fry said that Dundas's success in Knight v Wedderburn was "instrumental in prohibiting not only negro slavery but also native serfdom in Scotland."

Until 1785, he served also as Dean of the Faculty of Advocates. He was created a Legum Doctor by the University of Edinburgh on 11 November 1789, was Lord Rector of the University of Glasgow from 1781 to 1783, and on 2 February 1788 was appointed Chancellor of the University of St Andrews. He was also a trustee for the University of Edinburgh and South Bridge.

== Political career ==
=== Election to Parliament: the early years ===
In 1774, Dundas was returned to Parliament for Midlothian, and joined the party of Frederick North, Lord North; he was a proud Scots speaker and he soon distinguished himself by his clear and argumentative speeches. He was appointed Lord Advocate in 1775. His name appears in the 1776 minute book of the Poker Club. In 1778, Dundas made an attempt at proposing a Bill to relieve Scottish Catholics of their legal disabilities, but in response to severe riots in Edinburgh and Glasgow abandoned the project. After holding subordinate offices under William Petty, 2nd Earl of Shelburne and Pitt, he entered the cabinet in 1791 as Secretary of State for the Home Department.

=== Cessation of the slave trade ===
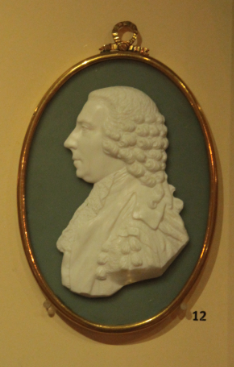
Medallion of Henry Dundas, National Museum of Scotland

On 2 April 1792, abolitionist William Wilberforce sponsored a motion in the House of Commons "that the trade carried on by British subjects, for the purpose of obtaining slaves on the coast of Africa, ought to be abolished." He had introduced a similar motion in 1791, which was soundly defeated by MPs, with a vote of 163 opposed, 88 in favour. Dundas was not present for that vote, but when it was again before MPs in 1792, Dundas tabled a petition from Edinburgh residents who supported abolition. He then went on to affirm his agreement in principle with Wilberforce's motion: "My opinion has been always against the Slave Trade." He argued, however, that a vote for immediate abolition would be ineffective, as it would drive the slave trade underground or into the hands of foreign nations, beyond Britain's control. He stated: "this trade must be ultimately abolished, but by moderate measures". He suggested that slavery and the slave trade should be abolished together, and proposed an end to hereditary slavery, which would have enabled the children born to present-day slaves to become free persons upon reaching adulthood. He then introduced an amendment that would add the word "gradual" to the Wilberforce motion. The amendment was adopted, and the motion passed with a vote of 230–85. For the first time, the House of Commons voted to end the slave trade.

Three weeks after the vote, Dundas tabled resolutions setting out a plan to implement gradual abolition by the end of 1799. At that time he told the House that proceeding too quickly would cause West Indian merchants and landowners to continue the trade "in a different mode and other channels". He argued that "if the committee would give the time proposed, they might abolish the trade; but, on the contrary, if this opinion was not followed, their children yet unborn would not see the end of the traffic." MPs ignored his cautions, and voted in favour of ending the trade in slaves by the end of 1796. The motion and resolutions later failed to win the necessary support of the House of Lords, which deferred consideration then dropped the issue altogether.

Alternative measures were proposed later in the 1790s. Dundas spoke against specific proposals tabled in 1796, while reiterating his support for abolition in principle, but abstained from voting. The loss of momentum was connected to three years of an ongoing war on three continents, including with revolutionary France.

It was not until 1807 that the House of Lords voted in favour of abolishing the trade in slaves. Historian Stephen Farrell has noted that by that time, the political climate had changed, and the economic advantages of abolition had become apparent. The Slave Trade Act 1807 prohibited the trade in slaves in the British Empire. Ownership of slaves, however, remained legal in most of the British Empire until passage of the Slavery Abolition Act 1833.

Between 1792 and 1807, when the slave trade was eventually abolished, another half a million Africans were transported into slavery in the British colonies. Dundas insisted that any abolition of the slave trade could not succeed without the support of West Indian colonial legislatures. Abolitionists argued that West Indian assemblies would never support such measures, and that by making the abolition of the slave trade dependent on colonial reforms, Dundas was in effect indefinitely delaying it. There is evidence, however, that Dundas had secured agreement of the West Indians before proposing the eight-year timeline. Recent peer-reviewed scholarship has also identified new archival evidence showing that Dundas had the support of several leading abolitionists, while the West Indian slave owners opposed his plan just as much as they opposed immediate abolition.

A few years after passage of the Slave Trade Act 1807, Wilberforce and Dundas encountered each other. Wilberforce recorded the event as follows: "We did not meet for a long time and all his connexions most violently abused me. About a year before he died ... we saw one another, and at first I thought he was passing on, but he stopped and called out, 'Ah Wilberforce, how do you do?' And gave me a hearty shake by the hand. I would have given a thousand pounds for that shake. I never saw him afterwards."

=== Key positions in government ===
From June 1793, Dundas was appointed President of the Board of Control, generally responsible for overseeing the conduct of the East India Company and British affairs in India, a post he would hold until 1801. As the effective Minister for War as part of his Home Department responsibilities at the outbreak of the Wars of the French Revolution, he was Pitt's closest advisor and planner for Britain's military participation in the First Coalition. Although Dundas was replaced as Home Secretary by the Duke of Portland in July 1794, Pitt nonetheless wished to maintain direction of the war effort in Dundas's trusted hands, and so created for him the new office of Secretary of State for War. During the period Dundas also effectively led much of Britain's domestic and foreign intelligence activities, directly receiving reports from foreign and domestic agents, initiating paramilitary operations, and sponsoring propaganda. Dundas was responsible for organising several British expeditions to the Caribbean to seize vulnerable French and Spanish possessions, the largest being that led by Sir Ralph Abercromy in 1795–6. Dundas spearheaded a vain attempt by the British to capture Saint-Domingue from the French during the Haitian Revolution. After they lost territory to the armies of Toussaint L'Ouverture, and became bogged down in their retreat to the western towns of Mole St Nicholas and Jérémie in Saint-Domingue, the British accepted they could not defeat the armies of black ex-slaves, and negotiated to withdraw from the island, resulting in thousands of British deaths for no gain.

Dundas also presided over a crisis in Britain's most important possession, the Colony of Jamaica. General George Walpole secured the surrender of the Jamaican Maroons of Cudjoe's Town (Trelawny Town), on condition they would not be transported off the island. The governor of Jamaica, Alexander Lindsay, 6th Earl of Balcarres, used a contrived breach of treaty as a pretext to deport most of the Trelawny Town Maroons to Nova Scotia. Walpole was disgusted with the governor's actions, pointing out that he had given the Maroons his word that they would not be transported off the island. Walpole resigned his commission, and went back to England, where he became an MP and protested in vain in the House of Commons how Balcarres had behaved in a duplicitous and dishonest way with the Maroons. Dundas sided with Balcarres in the dispute, and turned down Walpole's requests to get the Maroons returned to Jamaica.

Dundas was a vigorous advocate of a strong British presence in the Mediterranean. He promptly met the challenge of Napoleon's attack on Egypt with actions which were vigorous and pivotal. While he did not prevent the French landing, he did play a key role in defeating it, thus enhancing British security in India.

From about 1798 on he pleaded frequently to be allowed to resign from his offices on health grounds, but Pitt, who relied on him greatly, refused even to consider it. He was appointed Keeper of the Privy Seal of Scotland in 1800. Pitt's ministry left office in 1801. In 1802, Dundas was elevated to the Peerage of the United Kingdom as Viscount Melville and Baron Dunira, of Dunira in Perthshire. When Pitt returned to power in 1804, Dundas again entered office as First Lord of the Admiralty. Suspicion had arisen, however, as to the financial management of the Admiralty, of which Dundas had been treasurer between 1782 and 1800.

=== Commission of inquiry ===
Proceedings Against Viscount Melville Act 1805
- Act of Parliament
- Parliament of the United Kingdom
- Long title: An Act to provide that the Proceedings now depending in the House of Commons upon Articles of Charge of High Crimes and Misdemanors which have been exhibited against Henry Lord Viscount Melville shall not be discontinued by any Prorogation or Dissolution of Parliament.
- Citation: 45 Geo. 3. c. 125
- Territorial extent: United Kingdom

Dates
- Royal assent: 12 July 1805
- Commencement: 12 July 1805 (Note: The Acts of Parliament (Commencement) Act 1793.)
- Repealed: 6 August 1872
Other legislation
Repealed by	Statute Law Revision Act 1872

Status: Repealed

Text of statute as originally enacted

Indemnity to Persons Giving Evidence Against Viscount Melville Act 1805
- Act of Parliament
- Parliament of the United Kingdom
- Long title: An Act to indemnify Persons who shall give Evidence against Henry Lord Viscount Melville, upon the Impeachment voted against him by the Commons of the United Kingdom of Great Britain and Ireland in Parliament assembled, in respect of Acts done by such Persons in any Office or Employment held by them under the said Lord Viscount Melville, during the Time he held and enjoyed the Office of Treasurer of His Majesty's Navy.
- Citation: 45 Geo. 3. c. 126
- Territorial extent: United Kingdom

Dates
- Royal assent: 12 July 1805
- Commencement: 12 July 1805
- Repealed: 6 August 1872
Other legislation
Repealed by	Statute Law Revision Act 1872

Status: Repealed

Text of statute as originally enacted

In 1802 the Commissioners of Naval Inquiry commenced inquiries into embezzlement of public funds 20 years earlier, when Dundas was treasurer of the Navy. Its report was presented in 1805. The Navy's paymaster, Alexander Trotter, admitted to the commissioners that he had transferred public money from the Bank of England to his own credit in a private account at Coutts Bank, investing and loaning the funds at interest, from which he benefited. Although his transactions caused no loss of public money, but rather the loss of interest on that money, impeachment proceedings were taken against Dundas in 1806, given that the misappropriation had occurred during his term as Treasurer of the Navy. The trial, in the House of Lords, attracted considerable notice because of "dislike of patronage and the Pittite 'system', anti-Scottish bias, and advocacy of financial and parliamentary reform". The process ended in Dundas's acquittal.

Dundas had already left the Privy Council in 1805 but he remained in the House of Lords. He was readmitted to the Privy Council in 1807. He declined an offer of an earldom in 1809.

== Family ==
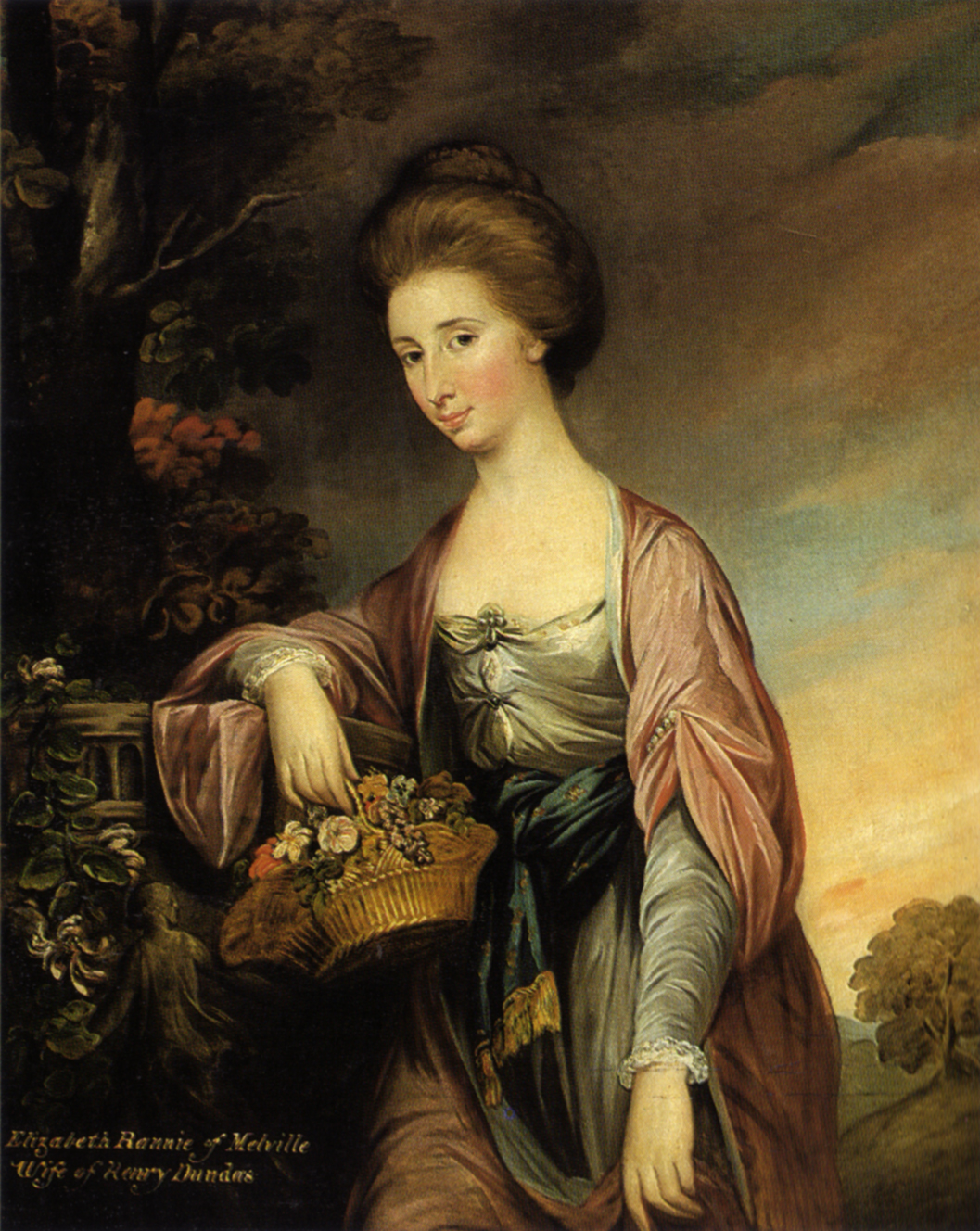
Elizabeth Rannie or Rennie, first wife of Henry Dundas

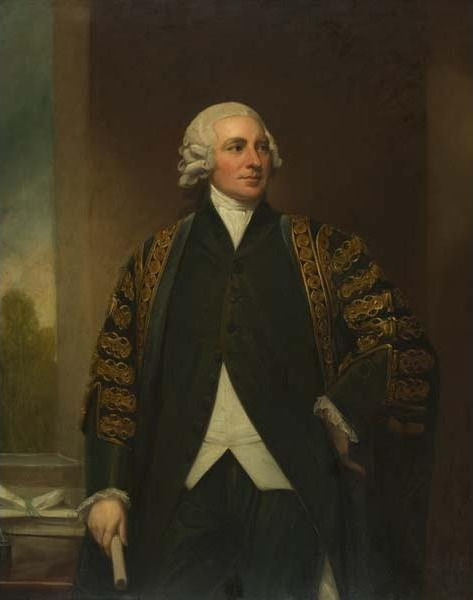
Henry Dundas, First Viscount Melville

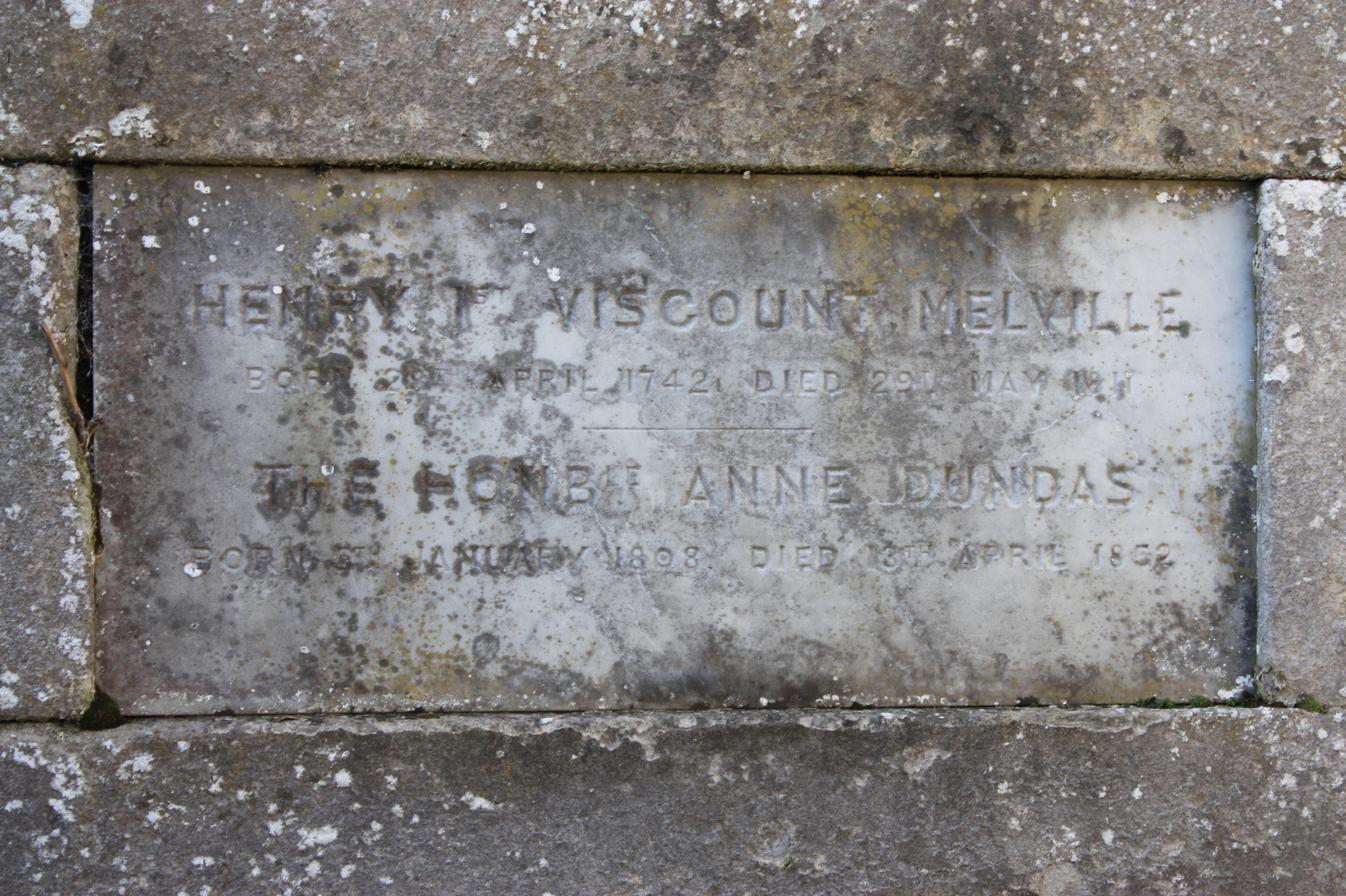
The simple stone to Henry Dundas, in the family vault. Old Lasswade Kirkyard

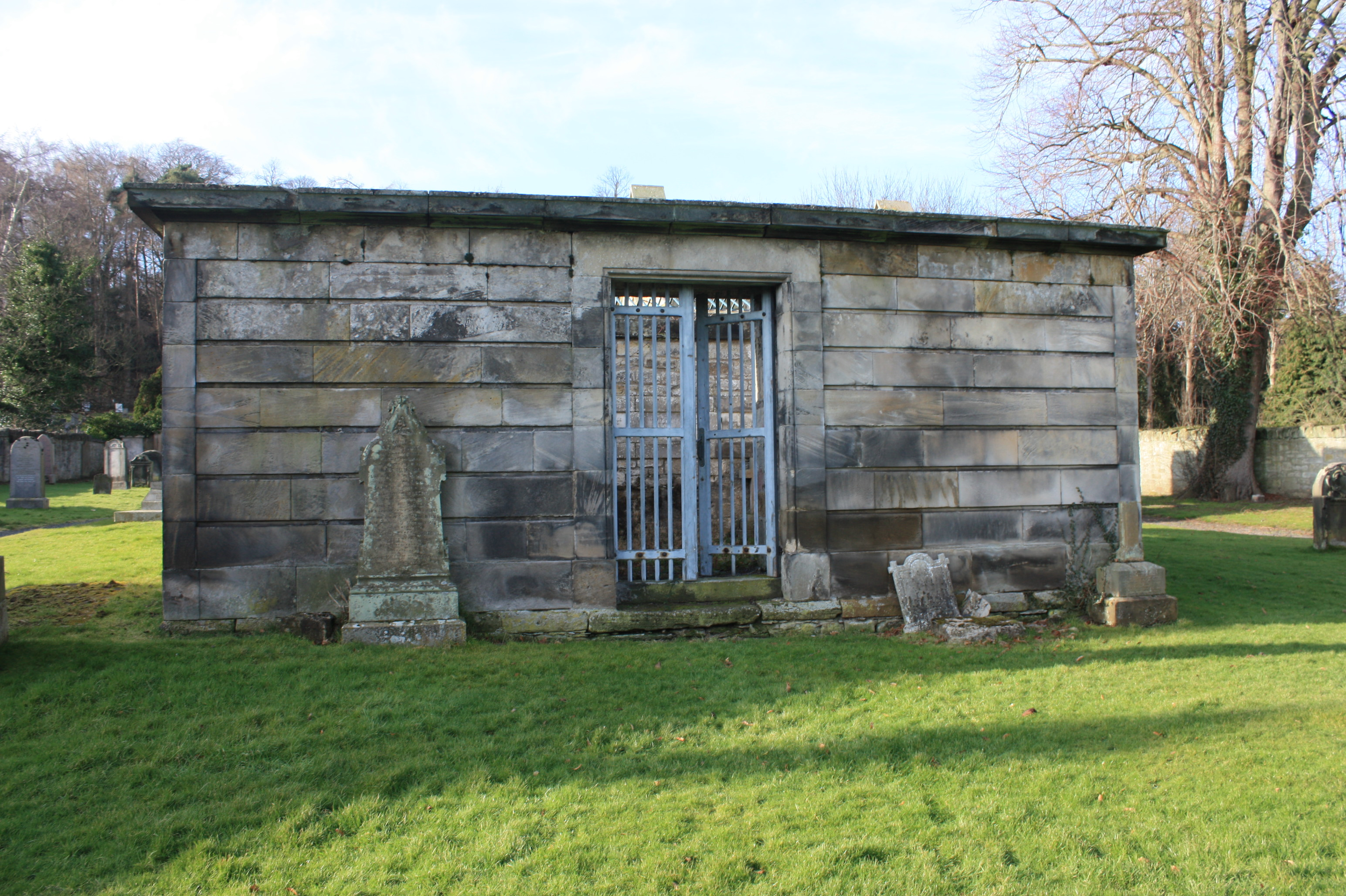
The Dundas Vault in old Lasswade Kirkyard, containing the first five Viscounts Melville

Lord Melville's first marriage was to Elizabeth Rannie, daughter of David Rannie, of Melville Castle, in 1765. She is believed to have been about 16 at the time of the marriage, although the date of her birth is not certain. She committed adultery (then known as "criminal conversation") with a Captain Everard Faukener in 1778, after 13 years of marriage, and abandoned Dundas and their four children, fleeing to an undisclosed location. Within days she confessed in a letter to Dundas, saying she was "undeserving of being your wife or the mother to your unhappy children". Approximately a month later they were divorced. She went on to marry Faukener and never saw her children again. Henry Dundas became the owner of the family patrimony she brought to the marriage, in accordance with the law of the time, and raised their four children at Melville Castle near Edinburgh. Dundas paid Elizabeth a monthly annuity until his death, which was not required by law. Their eldest son Robert inherited the estate in 1811. Robert, the 2nd Viscount Melville, continued the annuity until Elizabeth's death at the age of 98.

Between 1785 and 1806, Dundas leased a large country home called Warren House on the edge of Wimbledon Common, where his guests included George III, economist Adam Smith, abolitionist William Wilberforce, and Prime Minister William Pitt the Younger. After his divorce Dundas was married again, to Lady Jane Hope, daughter of John Hope, 2nd Earl of Hopetoun, in 1793. He died in May 1811, in Edinburgh, aged 69, and was succeeded in his titles by his son from his first marriage, Robert. The Viscountess Melville later married Thomas Wallace, 1st Baron Wallace, and died in June 1829.

Dundas is buried in a family vault in Old Lasswade Kirkyard. His most famous family member is actor Kit Harington.

== Legacy and memory ==
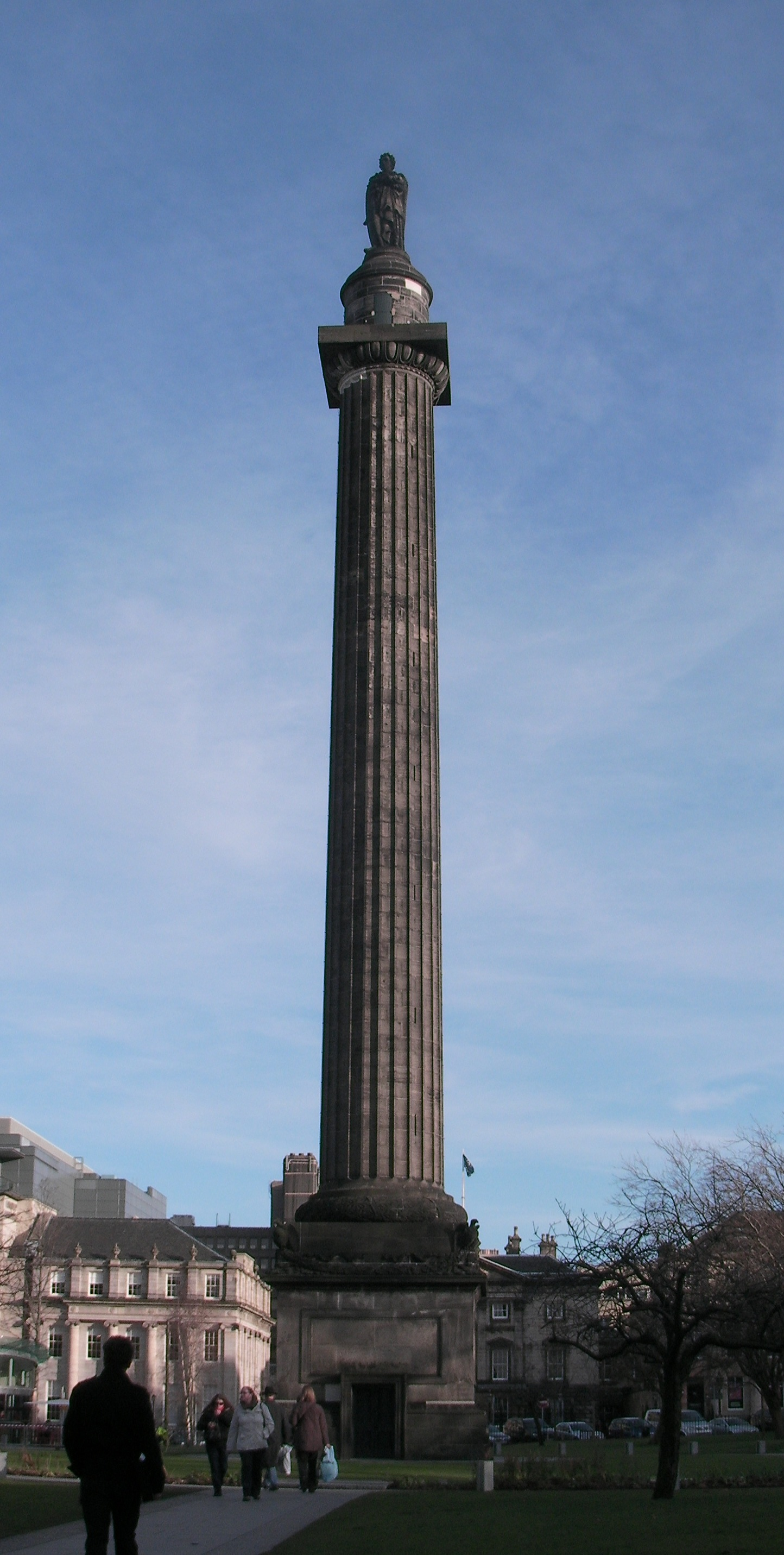
Melville Monument in St Andrew Square, Edinburgh.

Late in life Dundas' health suffered and he was financially distressed. He attended debates in the House of Lords and maintained his position as a member of Privy Council, but kept a lower public profile. However at his death the immediate reaction was one of widespread praise from most quarters (apart from the Whigs in Scotland). By 1900, however, historians were harsh, denouncing him as the epitome of corruption and oppression who had sold out Scotland to the English. By the late 20th century his reputation had been restored. He was praised for his military policies, for giving Scotland a cohesive government, and for making it a major player in imperial affairs.

Dundas was a friend of John Graves Simcoe, Lieutenant Governor of Upper Canada, who named a military road through Upper Canada (now southern Ontario) after him. In the city of Toronto, Sankofa Square (formerly Yonge–Dundas Square) is a prominent landmark and commercial centre, while Dundas Street is a main thoroughfare. On 14 December 2023, Toronto City Council adopted a change to the name of Yonge-Dundas Square to Sankofa Square (Confronting the Legacy of the Transatlantic Slave Trade). Dundas County, Ontario, and other highways and streets outside of Toronto, also bear his name.

Dundas Island off the coast of British Columbia was named by Captain George Vancouver in Dundas's honour. Vancouver originally believed it to be one island, Dundas's Island, but it was later determined that it was in fact a small archipelago. The group became known as the Dundas Islands, while constituent islands were given the names Melville Island, Baron Island, and Dunira Island, in respect of Dundas' titles.

The District of Dundas in New South Wales was named after the Colonial Secretary, Henry Dundas. The District of Dundas was abolished in 1889 although the name still survives in the Sydney suburb of Dundas.

In 1848, John Septimus Roe, the government surveyor (in the then colony of Western Australia), was searching for pastoral land and discovered the area around Norseman which he named Dundas Hills, after the colonial secretary. Gold was discovered there in 1893, the Dundas Field was proclaimed, and the town of Dundas established (c. 40 km south of Norseman, later abandoned), which eventually led to the present Shire of Dundas.

A monument to Dundas, modeled loosely on Trajan's Column in Rome, stands in the centre of St Andrew Square, Edinburgh. The cost of the Melville Monument was "met by contributions from officers and men of the Royal Navy". It was designed in 1821 by William Burn, who was advised by Robert Stevenson after residents of the square expressed concern about the adequacy of the foundations to support a column of such height. It cost £8,000. The garden surrounding the Melville Monument was opened to the public in 2008. A statue of Dundas, sculpted by Robert Forrest from a model by Francis Chantrey, was added to the top in 1828. The long-time headquarters of the Royal Bank of Scotland, directly to the east, is Dundas House; construction was completed in 1774 for Sir Lawrence Dundas, a relative. In July 2020 temporary signs were erected by the City of Edinburgh Council to note that the plaque would be updated to claim Dundas's role in delaying the abolition of slavery.

A statue (1818), by Sir Francis Chantrey, of Dundas stands against the north wall inside Parliament Hall in Edinburgh. Furthermore, the Melville Monument, an obelisk erected in 1812 on Dunmore hill, overlooking the scenic village of Comrie in Perthshire, commemorates his life.

Dundas Street, Hong Kong, was also named for him.

Bonnyrigg Rose Football Club, in the Scottish Second Division have named their new stadium New Dundas Park, in honour of Henry Dundas, 1st Viscount Melville whose wife lived locally at Melville Castle, and who was a keen supporter of "the Rose".

Namesake of Melville Island in Nova Scotia.

== Dispute over Dundas's impact on abolition ==
=== Academic discourse ===
In the 20th century, historians were divided over whether Dundas should be held solely responsible for prolonging the slave trade. Historians of the slave trade and the abolitionist movement, including David Brion Davis, Robin Blackburn, Roger Anstey, and Stephen Tomkins commented that Dundas's actions delayed rather than facilitated abolition. According to Davis, "By making the abolition of the slave trade dependent on colonial reforms, Dundas suggested possibilities for indefinite delay." Stephen Mullen, a research associate at Glasgow University, called Dundas "a great delayer" of abolition in 2021. These claims were criticized by historian Angela McCarthy, who rejected the notion that Dundas's actions were so singularly determinative of the course of events.

Other historians of British history argue that delay was inevitable. Angela McCarthy notes that the revolutionary wars with France, and opposition in the House of Lords and in the royal family, presented enormous obstacles. Sir Tom Devine, whose publications include editing Recovering Scotland's Slavery Past: The Caribbean Connection (Edinburgh University Press, 2015), has said that blaming Dundas solely for delay in the abolition of the slave trade ignores the wider political and economic factors that were the true causes of delay. In another Scottish Affairs article, McCarthy held that leading anti-Dundas activist Professor Emeritus Sir Geoff Palmer repeatedly misrepresented published sources. Brian Young notes that in 1792, the motion for immediate cessation of the slave trade was heading for certain defeat. By inserting the word "gradual" into the motion, Young says Dundas ensured a successful vote for the ultimate abolition of the trade in slaves.

=== Controversy over legacy ===
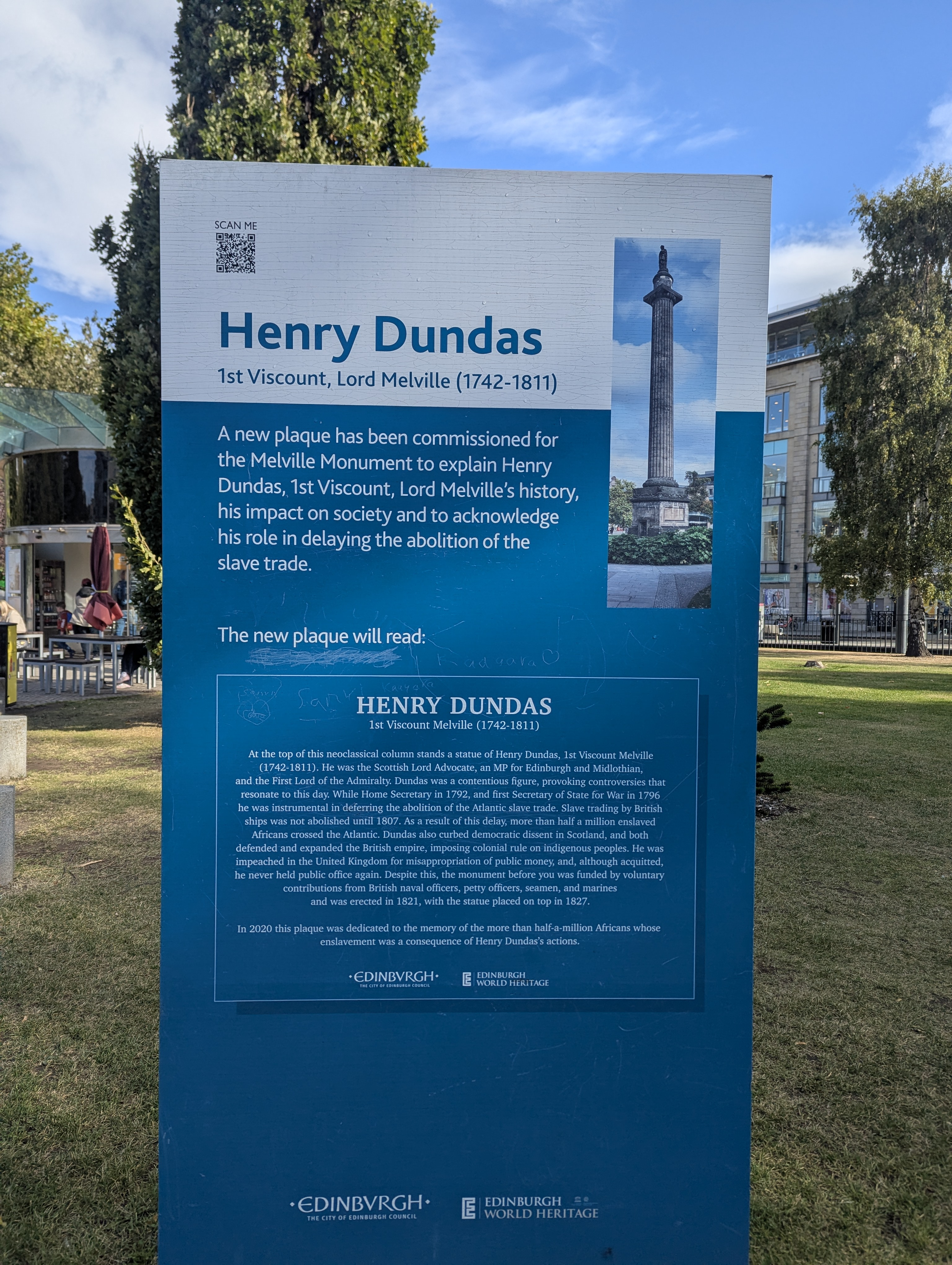
Visitor information sign explaining changes to the Melville Monument plaque.

Given accusations that he contributed to delay in the abolition of the transatlantic slave trade during the 1790s, activists have argued against the memorialisation of Dundas.

Over 14,000 people signed an online petition in June 2020 to rename Dundas Street, a major street in downtown Toronto. The petition arose from a Black Lives Matter protest on 5 June 2020, where Dundas Street was the site of the march. The protest was documented by Mark Terry in the film Scotland, Slavery, and Statues. In July 2021, Toronto City Council voted to rename the street and other civic assets, and in December 2023, Toronto City Council approved "Sankofa Square" as the new name for Yonge–Dundas Square.

In Edinburgh, demonstrators graffitied the Melville Monument in June 2020. In March 2021, the City of Edinburgh Council approved a permanent plaque dedicated to the memory of enslaved Africans. Numerous historians, including Scotland's most eminent historian Professor Emeritus Sir Tom Devine, as well as descendants of Dundas, criticised the content of the plaque as historically inaccurate.

== Fictional references ==
Lord Melville, as First Lord of the Admiralty, is present or a background character in several of Patrick O'Brian's Aubrey–Maturin novels. As a major official favourably disposed to Jack Aubrey, Lord Melville's political interest is often helpful to the captain. O'Brian casts Melville's impeachment for malversation of public monies as a political attack using naval intelligence spending, the details of which cannot be disclosed for security and the safety of intelligence agents—such as Stephen Maturin. Additionally, Heneage 'Hen' Dundas, a real-life naval officer son of Thomas Dundas, appears as a son of the 1st Lord Melville. As a former crewmate and close friend of one of the eponymous main characters, Jack Aubrey, Heneage Dundas is one of the recurring characters of the series.

He is also a supporting character in the legal drama Garrow's Law. As a leading figure of the establishment, he is a bitter enemy of the radical hero, William Garrow. He is played by Stephen Boxer. Also, fictional references were made to Sir Henry Dundas in Chapter 24 of L. A. Meyer's third book in the Jacky Faber series, which was titled "Under the Jolly Roger" as well as the former Lord Dundas in Meyer's sixth book, which was titled, "My Bonny Light Horseman". He was portrayed as 'bookish', although a sweet and sincere man otherwise. A reference was made to Henry Dundas and his role in the abolition of the slave trade in the motion picture Amazing Grace (2006) where he was played by Bill Paterson.

Dundas is also featured in Joseph Knight, by James Robertson (Fourth Estate, 2003) – a fictional account of the true story of the former slave for whom Dundas successfully appealed to two levels of Scottish courts, ultimately winning a declaration of Knight's emancipation, and the emancipation of all purported slaves on Scottish soil.

A reanimated version of Dundas is an antagonist in the later books of Tendai Huchu's Edinburgh Nights fantasy book series.

== Arms ==
Coat of arms of Henry Dundas, 1st Viscount Melville
Crest A lion's head affronteé Gules struggling through an oak bush all Proper. Escutcheon Argent a lion rampant Gules within a bordure Azure charged with three boars' heads couped Or two in chief and one in base. Supporters Dexter a leopard reguardant, sinister a stag, both Proper. Motto Essayez (top); Quod Potui Perfecti (I have done what I could do.) (bottom)

== Notes ==
Parliament of Great Britain
Preceded by Sir Alexander Gilmour	Member of Parliament for Midlothian; 1774–1790	Succeeded by Robert Dundas
Preceded by Sir Adam Fergusson	Member of Parliament for Edinburgh; 1790–1802	Succeeded by Charles Hope
Legal offices
Preceded by Sir James Montgomery	Solicitor General for Scotland; 1766–1775	Succeeded by Alexander Murray
Preceded by Sir James Montgomery	Lord Advocate; 1775–1783	Succeeded by Henry Erskine
Political offices
Preceded by Isaac Barré	Treasurer of the Navy; 1782–1783	Succeeded by Charles Townshend
Preceded by Charles Townshend	Treasurer of the Navy; 1784–1800	Succeeded by Dudley Ryder
Preceded by The Lord Grenville	Home Secretary; 1791–1794	Succeeded by The Duke of Portland
Preceded by The Lord Grenville	President of the Board of Control; 1793–1801	Succeeded by The Viscount Lewisham
New office	Secretary of State for War; 1794–1801	Succeeded by Lord Hobart as Secretary of State for War and the Colonies
Preceded by James Stuart-Mackenzie	Keeper of the Privy Seal of Scotland; 1800–1811	Succeeded by The 2nd Viscount Melville
Preceded by The Earl of St Vincent	First Lord of the Admiralty; 1804–1805	Succeeded by The Lord Barham
Academic offices
Preceded by The Earl of Lauderdale	Rector of the University of Glasgow; 1781–1783	Succeeded by Edmund Burke
Preceded by The Earl of Kinnoull	Chancellor of the University of St Andrews; 1788–1811	Succeeded by The Duke of Cambridge
Honorary titles
Vacant Title last held by The Duke of Northumberland	Custos Rotulorum of Middlesex; 1793–1794	Succeeded by Marquess of Titchfield
Peerage of the United Kingdom
New creation	Viscount Melville; 1802–1811	Succeeded by Robert Dundas
