= Viscount Melville =

Title in the Peerage of the United Kingdom

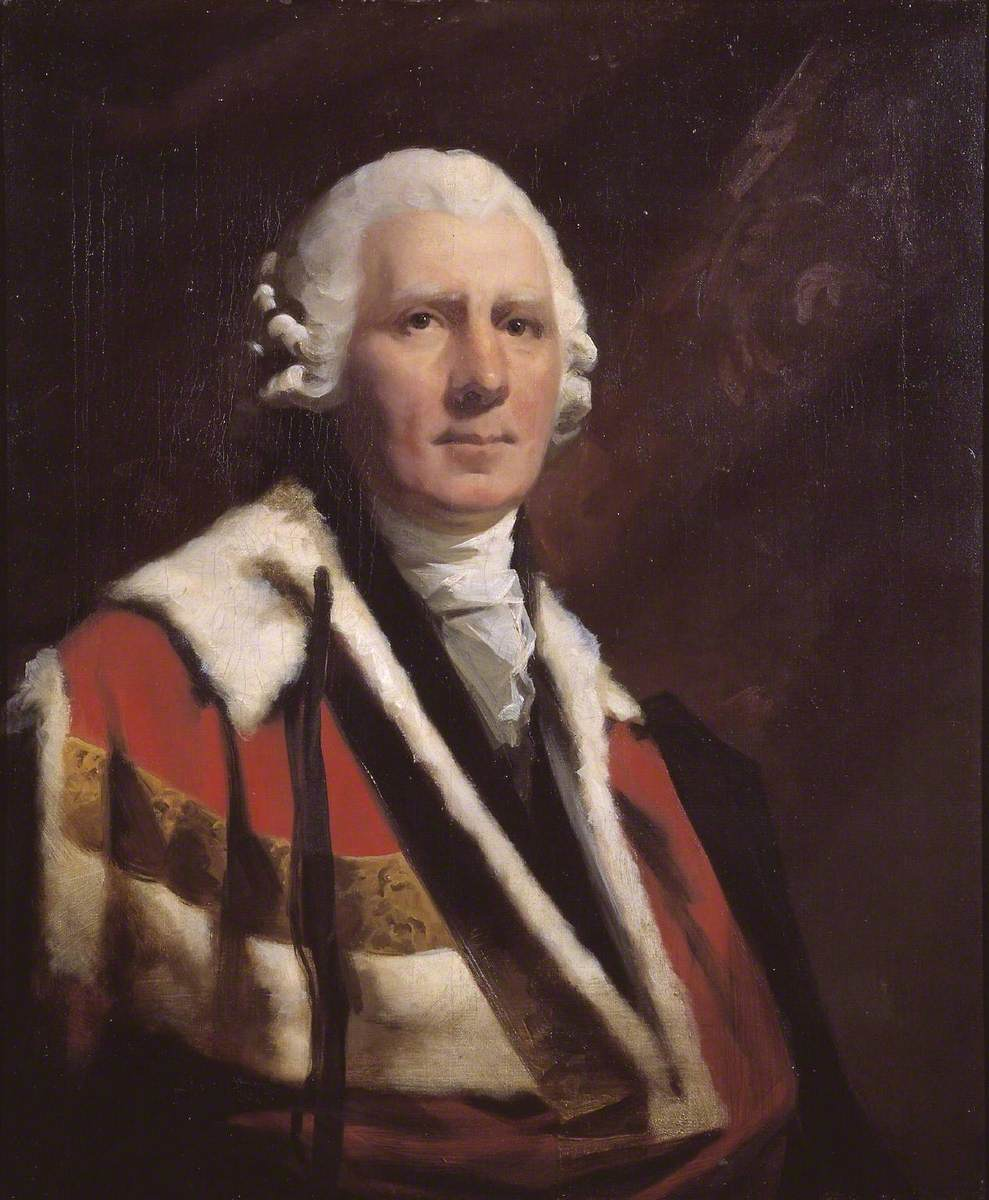
Henry Dundas, 1st Viscount Melville

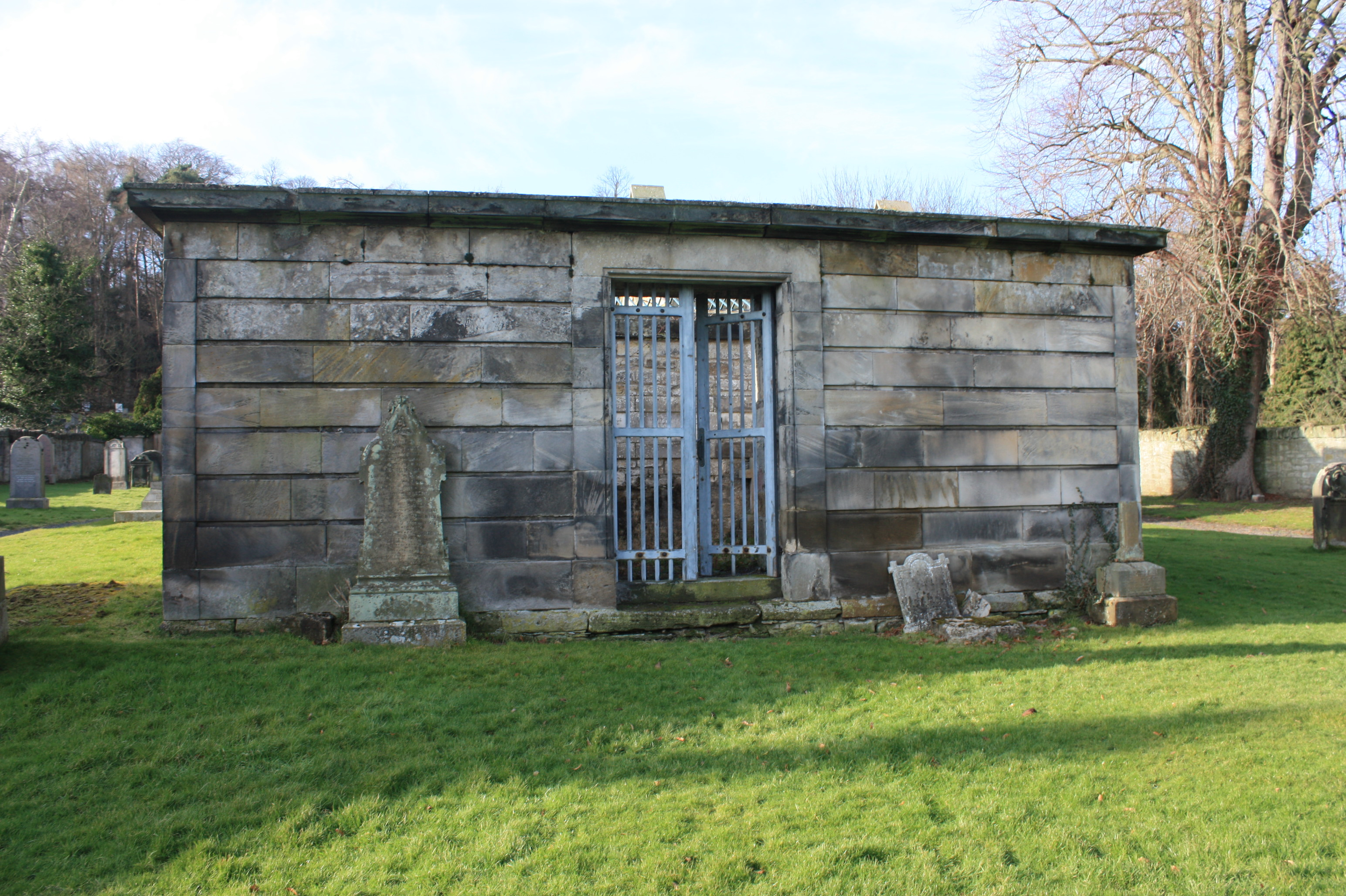
The Dundas Vault in old Lasswade Kirkyard, containing the first five Viscounts Melville

Viscount Melville, of Melville in the County of Edinburgh, is a title in the Peerage of the United Kingdom.

== Origins ==
The title was created on 24 December 1802 for the notable lawyer and politician Henry Dundas. He was created Baron Dunira, of Dunira in the County of Perth, at the same time, also in the Peerage of the United Kingdom. Dundas, who was the fourth son of Robert Dundas, of Arniston, the elder, declined an earldom in 1809.

He was succeeded by his son, the second Viscount, who was also a noted politician. He assumed for himself the additional surname of Saunders, which was that of his father-in-law. His son, the third Viscount, was a General in the British Army. The latter was succeeded by his younger brother, the fourth Viscount, who in his turn was succeeded by his nephew, the fifth Viscount, the eldest son of Reverend the Honourable Charles Dundas, Rector of Epworth, Lincolnshire, fourth son of the second Viscount. The fifth Viscount was succeeded by his younger brother, the sixth Viscount, a minor diplomat. The titles descended from father to son until the death of the sixth Viscount's grandson, the eighth Viscount, in 1971. The latter was succeeded by his nephew, the ninth Viscount, the eldest son of the Honourable Robert Maldred St John Melville Dundas, second son of the seventh Viscount. As of 2014 the titles are held by the ninth Viscount's eldest son, the tenth Viscount, who succeeded in 2011.

The family seat is Melville Castle between Dalkeith and Lasswade. The first five viscounts (including Henry Dundas) are buried in a simple vault (gated but unlocked) in Old Lasswade Kirkyard. The 6th Viscount Melville, Charles Saunders Dundas, lies opposite his wife, Mary Hamilton Dundas, in the small north cemetery in Lasswade, adjacent to the old kirkyard. Their son, the 7th Viscount merely appears as a footnote on the monument.

== Viscounts Melville (1802) ==
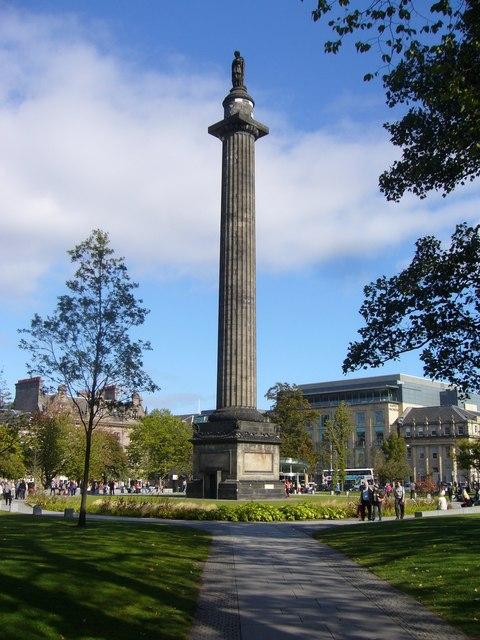
Melville Monument in St. Andrew Square, Edinburgh, erected in memory of Henry Dundas, 1st Viscount Melville in 1821

- Henry Dundas, 1st Viscount Melville (1742–1811)
- Robert Saunders–Dundas, 2nd Viscount Melville (1771–1851) and son of 1st Viscount
- Henry Dundas, 3rd Viscount Melville (1801–1876) son of 2nd Viscount
- Robert Dundas, 4th Viscount Melville (1803–1886) son of 2nd Viscount and brother of the 3rd
- Henry Dundas, 5th Viscount Melville (1835–1904) nephew of 2nd Viscount
- Charles Saunders Dundas, 6th Viscount Melville (1843–1926) brother of 5th Viscount
- Henry Charles Clement Dundas, 7th Viscount Melville (1873–1935) son of 6th Viscount
- Henry Charles Patric Brouncker Dundas, 8th Viscount Melville (1909–1971) son of 7th Viscount
- Robert David Ross Dundas, 9th Viscount Melville (1937–2011) nephew of 8th Viscount
- Robert Henry Kirkpatrick Dundas, 10th Viscount Melville (b. 1984) son of 9th Viscount

The heir apparent is the present holder's son Hon. Max David Henry Dundas (b. 2018)

Coat of arms of Viscount Melville
Crest A lion's head affronteé Gules struggling through an oak bush all Proper. Escutcheon Argent a lion rampant Gules within a bordure Azure charged with three boars' heads couped Or two in chief and one in base. Supporters Dexter a leopard reguardant, sinister a stag, both Proper. Motto Essayez (top); Quod Potui Perfecti (bottom)

== See also ==
- Dunira, Perthshire
