= Melville Castle =

Mansion in Midlothian, Scotland

Coordinates: 55.8910°N 3.1042°W

Melville Castle Hotel
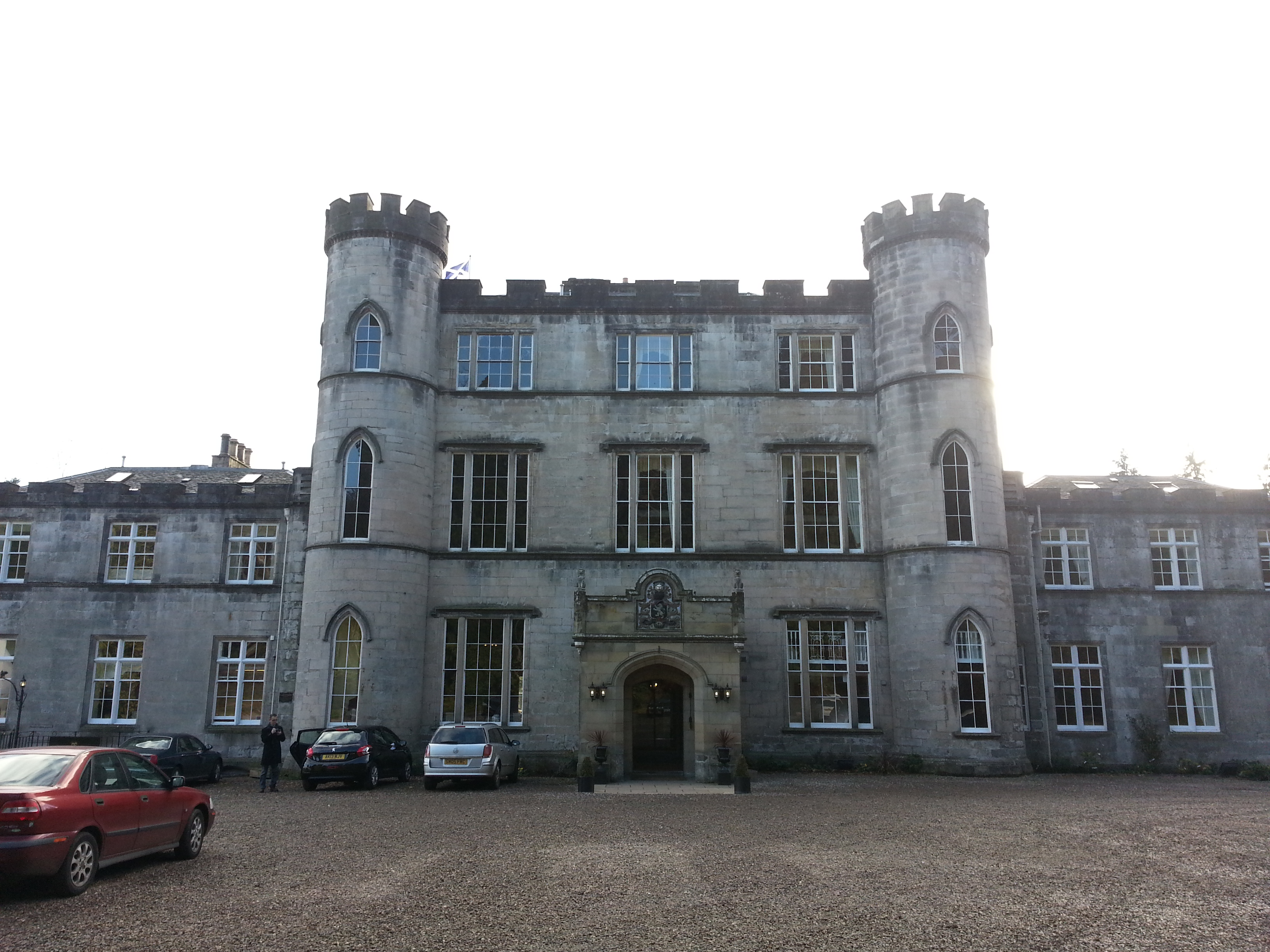
- Melville Castle in 2014

General information
- Location: Near Dalkeith, Midlothian, Scotland
- Opening: 2003 (reopened after restoration)

Technical details
- Grounds: 54 acres

Design and construction
- Architect: James Playfair

Other information
- Number of rooms: 33
- Number of suites: 2
- Parking: On site

Website
- www.melvillecastle.com

Inventory of Gardens and Designed Landscapes in Scotland
- Official name: Melville Castle
- Designated: 30 June 1987
- Reference no.: GDL00282

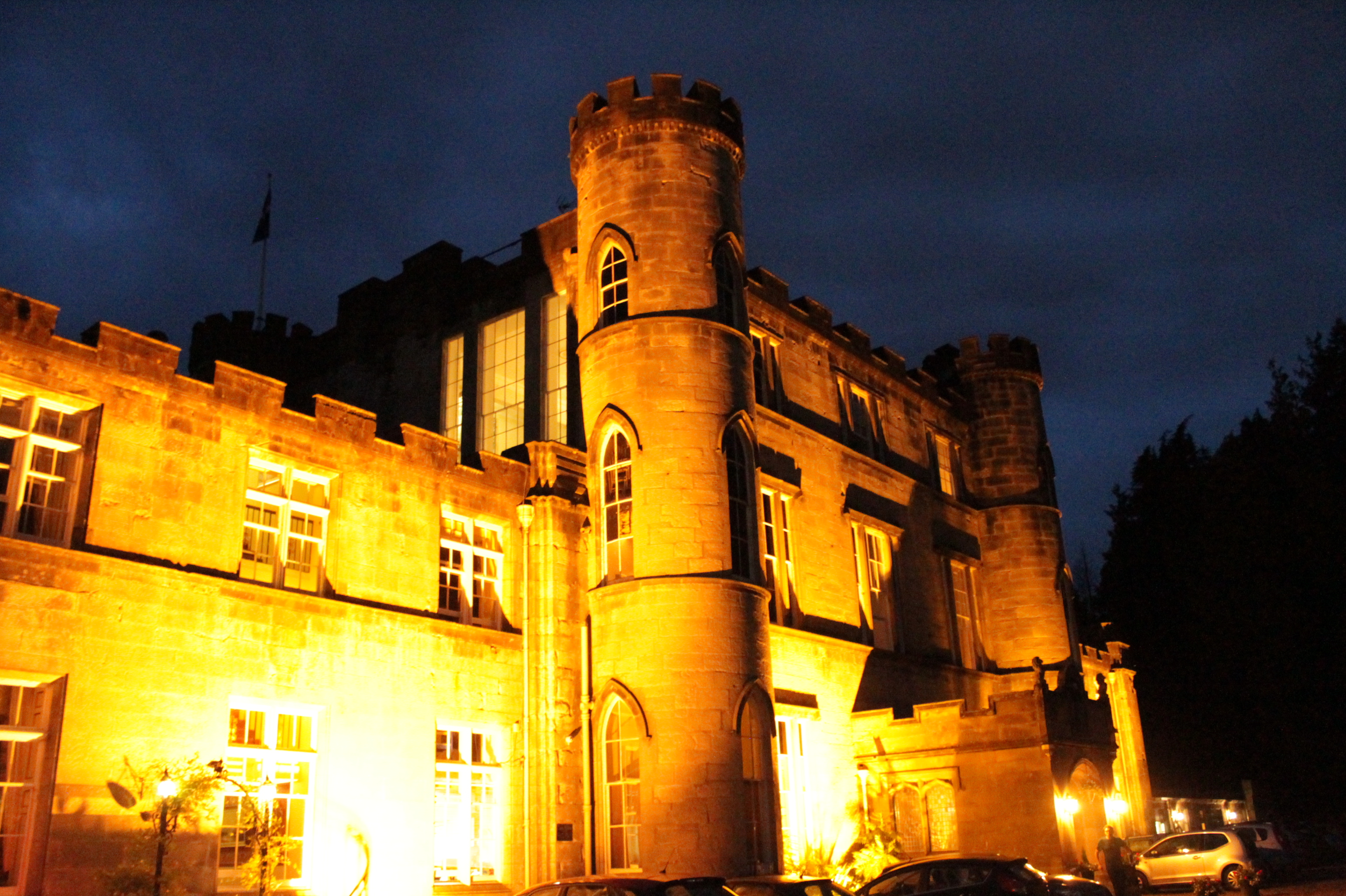
Melville Castle by night

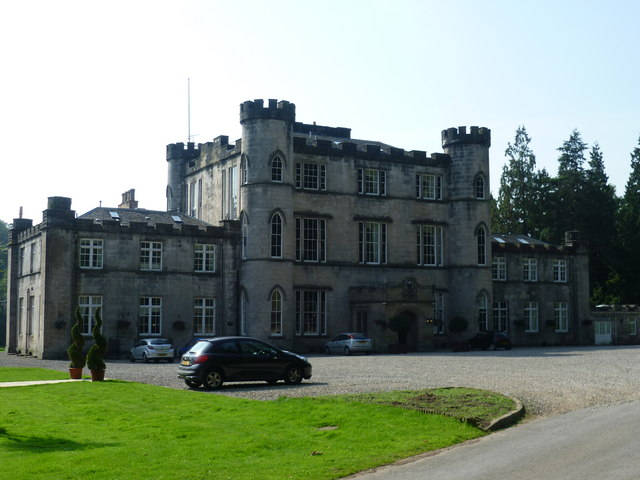
Entrance front of Melville Castle

Melville Castle is a three-storey Gothic mansion situated less than a mile (>2 km) west-south-west of Dalkeith, Midlothian, near the North Esk.

== History ==
The castle originally dates back as far as 1155, when it was owned by the Sheriff of Edinburgh and Governor of Edinburgh Castle, Galfrid de Malle. From there, the estate remained in his family until it was passed to Sir John Ross of Halkhead in 1371. The Ross family would continue to run the estate for several generations afterwards. The castle was then bought by Rennie (Rannie, depending on spelling), who had made his money overseas in Asia, but unfortunately died a few years after returning, and the Castle was inherited by Elizabeth Rennie, his daughter, who married Henry Dundas at the age of 14 years, and he received the castle through marriage. They divorced in 1780, and the Tower Castle was demolished to ground level in that year.

The present castle was designed in 1786–1791 by James Playfair for Henry Dundas, 1st Viscount Melville. The castle remained in the ownership of the Dundas family until after the Second World War, when the ninth Lord Melville moved to a smaller house on the estate and the castle was leased as an army rehabilitation centre, and then later as a hotel. It was owned by an American couple and then a Norwegian couple. By the early 1980s, the hotel fell into disrepair and was unoccupied. In the late 1980s, the estate and the adjoining farms were sold, but remained closed.

In 1993, the castle was purchased by the Hay Trust, which extensively restored the property over an eight-year period. The castle was reopened as a hotel in June 2003.

Original Collection purchased the lease and re-opened the hotel in 2021, having undertaken extensive refurbishment work.

== Royal and Notable Visits ==
Melville Castle hotel has a history of nobility and historical figures who became entranced by the castle’s impressive structure and grounds.

Perhaps the most notable of the royals to visit Melville Castle was Mary, Queen of Scots. In fact, not only was she a frequent guest at the castle, but her relationship with Seigneur David Rizzio, who was housed in some of the castle’s apartments, was the cause of controversy. As a sign of his love for her, he planted a tree on the property. In return, she planted five oak trees along the drive, which have survived to this day.

In 1828 the castle was visited by King George IV (look at history as to why George IV visited - it was to check out the Dundas family because a statue was erected in St andrews Square in Edinburgh to Dundas and the spot originally was intended as a statue site commemorating George IV but he was moved to a less prominent space near Waverly). This is why a road was built between Melville Castle and Buccleuch Palace in Dalkeith Country Park, which directly links the two properties so that the king could visit the castle whilst he was staying there.

Queen Victoria visited in 1842, which attracted the interest of nearby neighbour Sir Walter Scott. In fact, Sir Walter Scott was a frequent visitor to Melville Castle and even nods to the estate in his poem, “The Gray Brother.”

"Who knows not Melville’s beechy grove, And Roslin’s rocky glen, Dalkeith, which all the virtues love, And classic Hawthornden?"

There is a song called “Willies gane to Melville Castle” which is famous with the local Edinburgh football club Hibernedian.

== Present Day ==
Melville Castle currently operates as a hotel and wedding venue, offering 33 individually styled bedrooms and suites. Many of the rooms retain historical features such as four-poster beds, while others have been refurbished with modern comforts and views across the castle grounds.

The castle is set within 54 acres of parkland and woodland, which include mature trees and landscaped gardens. The site caters to both private stays and large events, including weddings and corporate functions. Facilities include indoor dining spaces for up to 60 guests and a contemporary marquee that can accommodate up to 160 diners and 200 guests for evening receptions. The estate also offers two bridal suites and a range of catering options using locally sourced produce.

In addition to accommodations and events, the property features a restaurant and bar, with public spaces such as a library bar and reception area designed to reflect the building’s historic character. The grounds remain accessible to guests and include the reputed oak trees planted during visits by Mary, Queen of Scots.

== See also ==
- List of castles in Scotland
- Melville Castle - an East Indiaman launched in 1786 and wrecked with great loss of life in 1802
