= Dundas (surname) =

Dundas is a surname and a Scottish clan (Clan Dundas). Notable people with the surname include:

- Adela (Ada) Dundas (1840–1887), Scottish artist
- Charles Dundas (disambiguation), multiple people
- David Dundas (disambiguation), multiple people
- Francis Dundas (c. 1759–1824), British army officer
- George Dundas (disambiguation), multiple people
- Henry Dundas (disambiguation), multiple people
- Hugh Dundas (1920–1995), British World War II fighter pilot
- James Dundas (disambiguation), multiple people
- John Dundas (disambiguation), multiple people
- Lawrence Dundas (disambiguation), multiple people
- Maria Callcott (née Dundas; 1785–1842), British writer
- Mark Dundas, 4th Marquess of Zetland (1937–2026), British peer
- Paul Dundas (c. 1952–2023), British scholar
- Richard Saunders Dundas (1802–1861), British naval officer
- Robert Dundas (disambiguation), multiple people
- Rocky Dundas (born 1967), Canadian hockey player and pastor
- Ron Dundas (1935-1986), Canadian football player
- Roslyn Dundas (born 1978), Australian politician
- Shane Dundas (born 1971), Australian comedian
- Thomas Dundas (disambiguation), multiple people
- William Dundas (1762–1845), Scottish politician
- William Dundas of Fingask (died 1599), Scottish courtier
- William John Dundas (1849–1921), Scottish lawyer and mathematician

== See also ==
- Dundas (disambiguation)
- Charlotte Dundas, steamboat
