= Salisbury ministry =

Salisbury ministry may refer to:

- First Salisbury ministry, the British government led by Lord Salisbury from 1885 to 1886
- Second Salisbury ministry, the British government led by Lord Salisbury from 1886 to 1892
- Third Salisbury ministry, the British government led by Lord Salisbury from 1895 to 1900
- Fourth Salisbury ministry, the British government led by Lord Salisbury from 1900 to 1902
