= The Marriage of the Duke of Connaught =

Painting by Sydney Prior Hall

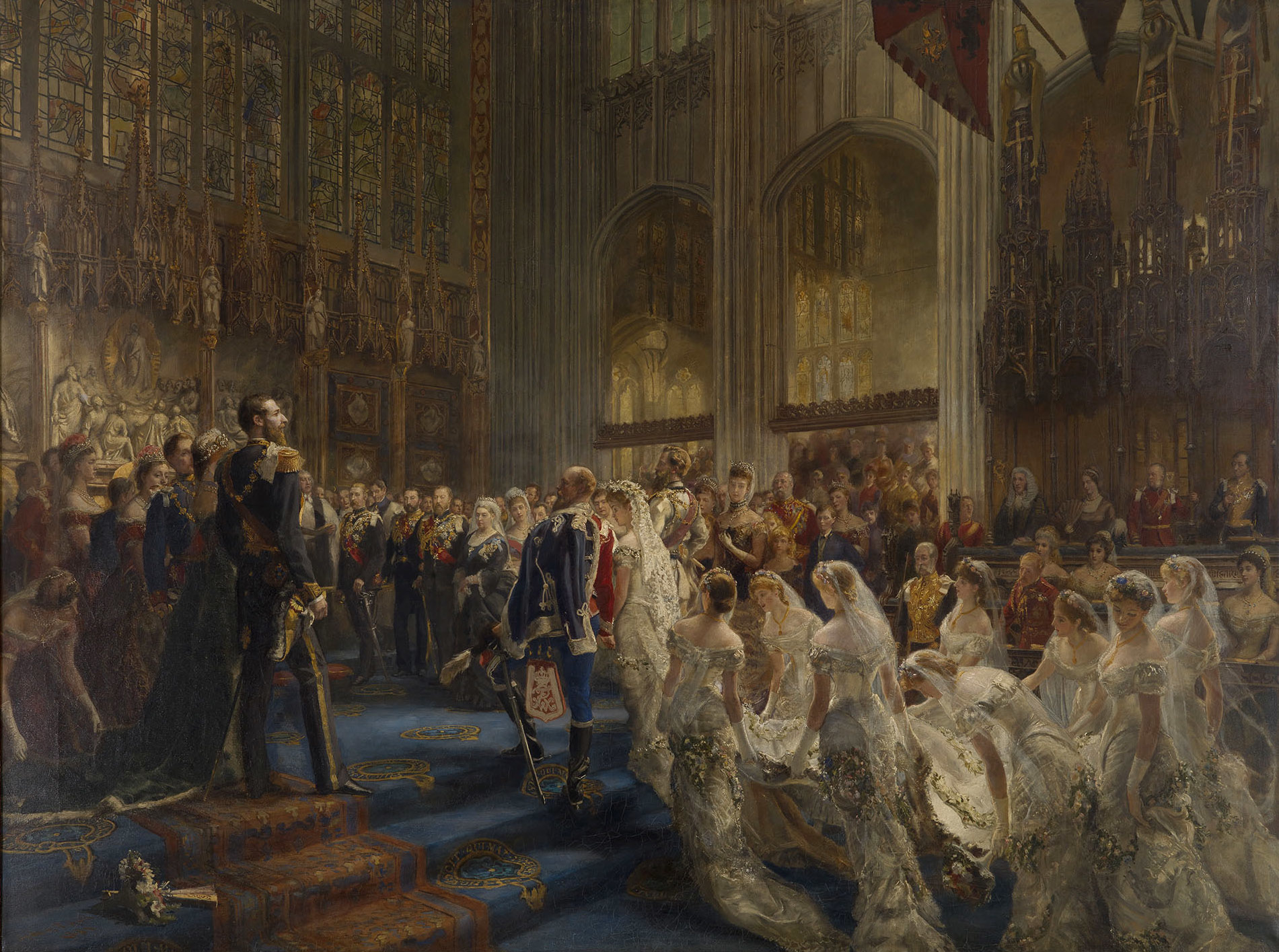
- Artist: Sydney Prior Hall
- Year: 1881
- Type: Oil on canvas, historical painting
- Dimensions: 137.5 cm × 184.5 cm (54.1 in × 72.6 in)
- Location: Royal Collection

The Marriage of the Duke of Connaught is an oil on canvas history painting by the British artist Sydney Prior Hall, from 1881.

== History and description ==
It depicts the wedding of Prince Arthur, Duke of Connaught and Strathearn and Princess Louise Margaret of Prussia in St George's Chapel, Windsor Castle, on 13 March 1879.

Arthur was the third son of Queen Victoria and Prince Albert. Louise was a daughter of Prince Friedrich Karl of Prussia and Princess Maria Anna of Anhalt-Dessau. A 2003 book claims that it was a love match, with the princess also keen to get away from her royal residence in Berlin and from her father's bullying.

The painting was commissioned by Queen Victoria. It shows Louise Margaret being escorted by her father and Crown Prince Wilhelm to the alter, where Arthur, Queen Victoria, and Princes Albert Edward and Alfred are waiting. Despite initial promises by the artist, the portrait was not finished by June 1881. It was also exhibited at the Royal Academy's Summer Exhibition of 1882.
