= James Dundas =

James Dundas may refer to:

- James Dundas (VC) (1842–1879), Scottish VC recipient
- James Dundas (MP), MP for Linlithgowshire (1770–74)
- James Dundas, Lord Arniston (1620–1679), Scottish politician and judge
- James Whitley Deans Dundas (1785–1862), Royal Navy officer
- James Dundas (bishop), Anglican bishop

== See also ==
- Dundas (surname)
