= The Marriage of Princess Louise of Wales with the Duke of Fife =

Painting by Sydney Prior Hall

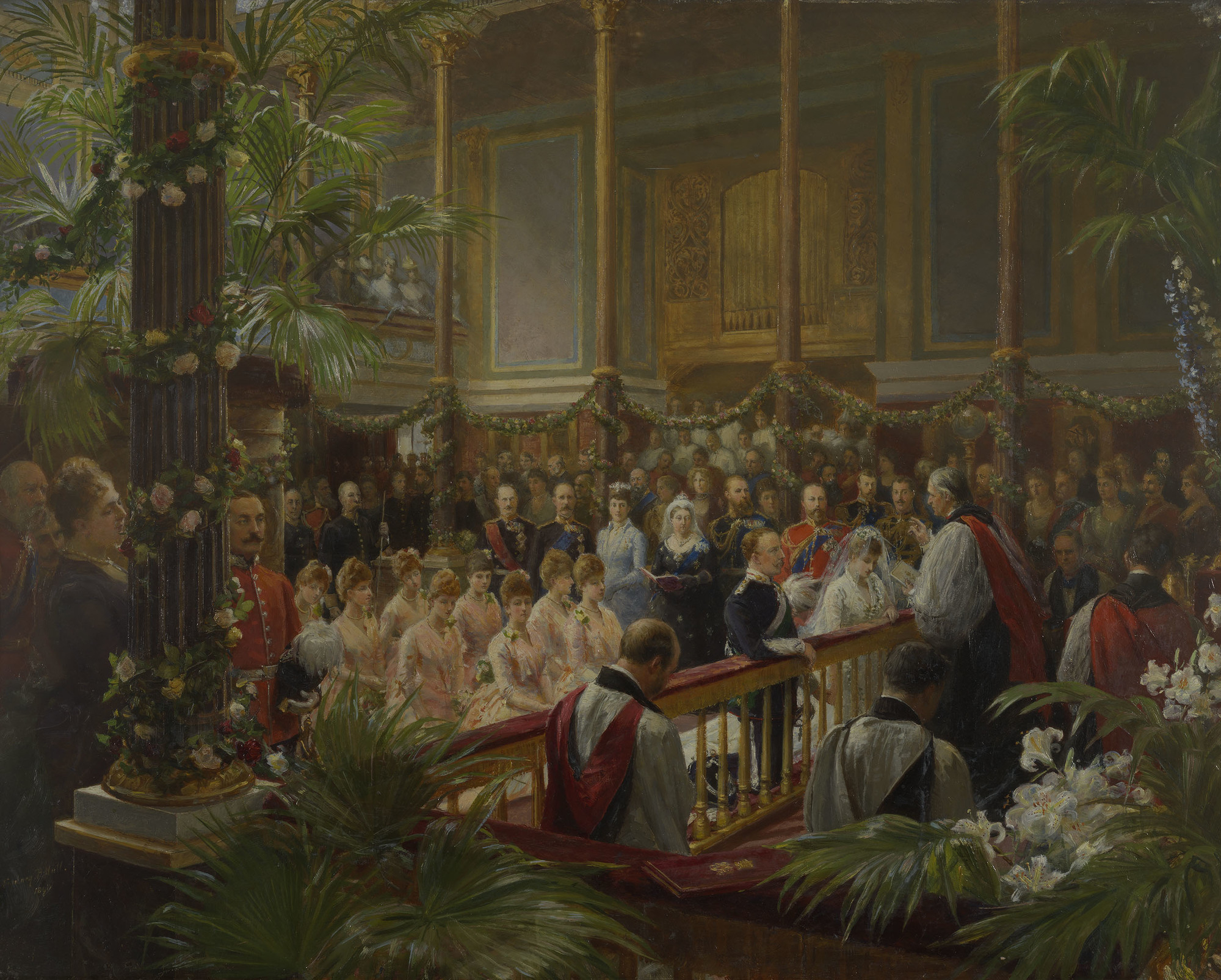
- Artist: Sydney Prior Hall
- Year: 1890
- Type: Oil on canvas, historical painting
- Dimensions: 55.0 cm × 70.0 cm (21.7 in × 27.6 in)
- Location: Royal Collection

The Marriage of Princess Louise of Wales with the Duke of Fife is an oil on canvas history painting by the British artist Sydney Prior Hall, from 1890.

== History and description ==
It depicts the wedding of Princess Louise of Wales (later Princess Royal) and Alexander Duff, 1st Earl of Fife (later 1st Duke of Fife) at the Private Chapel in Buckingham Palace on 27 July 1889.

Louise was the eldest daughter of Albert Edward, Prince of Wales (later King Edward VII) and Alexandra, Princess of Wales (later Queen Alexandra) and a granddaughter of the then-reigning monarch, Queen Victoria. Alexander was the only son of James Duff, 5th Earl Fife and Lady Agnes Hay. Louise was introduced to Alexander at the wedding of her aunt Princess Beatrice in 1885, who was a regular companion of her father and eighteen years her senior. Four years later, she asked for her grandmother, Queen Victoria's permission to marry the Earl, insisting that if she was not allowed to marry him she would surely die an old maid.

The painting was commissioned by Queen Victoria. Sydney Prior Hall had previously completed portraits of the weddings of Louise's paternal aunt and uncle, Princess Louise and Prince Arthur, respectively. The portrait was initially hung at the Queen and the Duke's Corridor at Buckingham Palace and was also put on display at an exhibition.
