= Unionist government, 1895–1905 =

Government of the United Kingdom

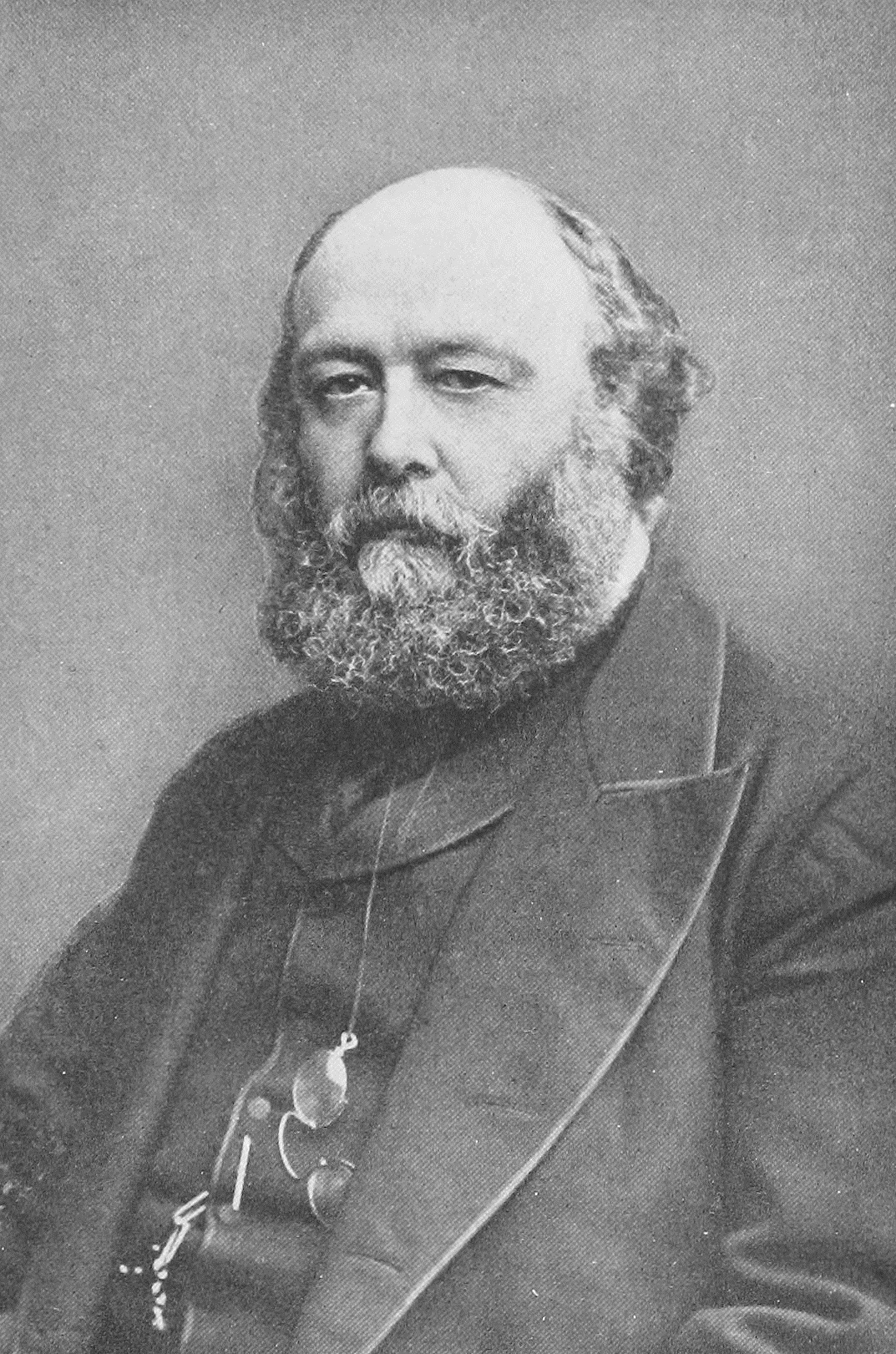
Lord Salisbury led the Government from 1895–1902 and was succeeded by Arthur Balfour.

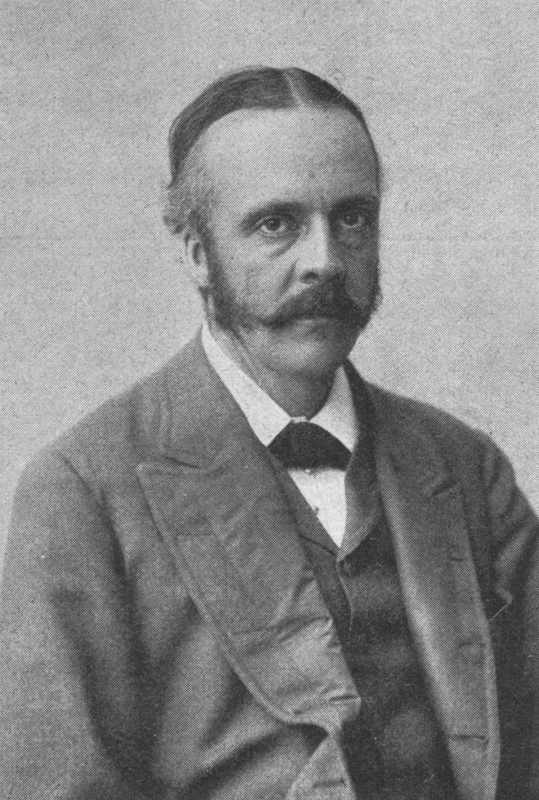
Balfour led the Government from 1902 before resigning in 1905. The Liberals formed a government thereafter.

A coalition of the Conservative and Liberal Unionist parties took power in the United Kingdom shortly before the 1895 general election. Conservative leader Lord Salisbury was appointed Prime Minister and his nephew, Arthur Balfour, became Leader of the House of Commons, but various major posts went to the Liberal Unionists, most notably the Leader of the House of Lords, the Liberal Unionist Spencer Cavendish, 8th Duke of Devonshire, who was made Lord President, and his colleague in the Commons, Joseph Chamberlain, who became Colonial Secretary. It was this government which would conduct the Second Boer War from 1899–1902, which helped them to win a landslide victory at the 1900 general election.

The government consisted of three ministries, the first two led by Salisbury (from 1895–1902) and the third by Balfour (from 1902 onwards).

== The office of Prime Minister ==
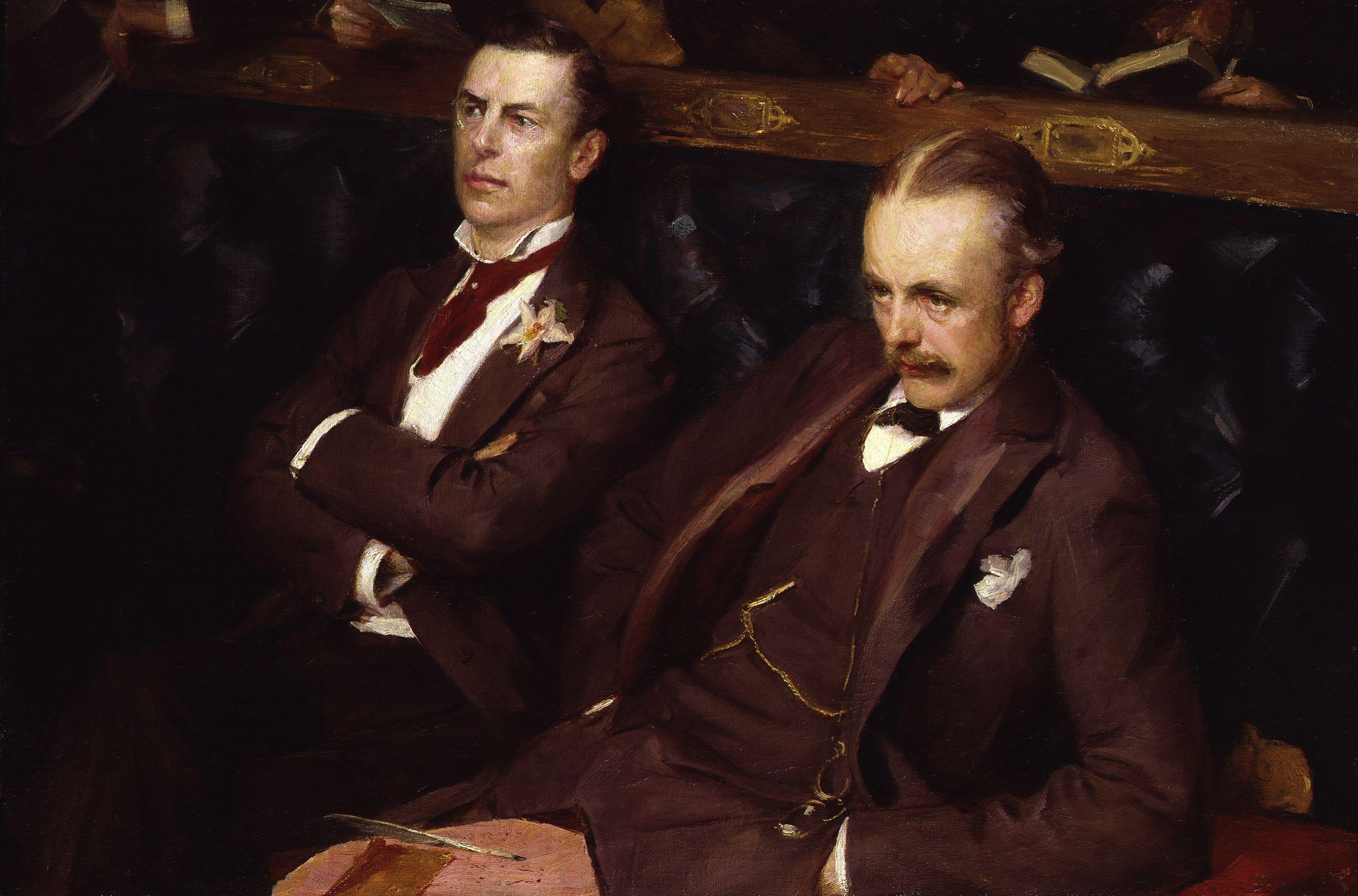
Joseph Chamberlain and Arthur Balfour by Sydney Prior Hall

Lord Salisbury was the second and last person to be head of government while not simultaneously holding the title of First Lord of the Treasury. It was said that there were some attempts to distinguish between the two offices, but in the century or more since, they have remained one and the same.

== Trade reform ==
Balfour succeeded Salisbury as prime minister in 1902. Eventually, the Unionist government would falter after Chamberlain proposed his scheme for tariff reform, whose partial embrace by Balfour led to the resignation of the more orthodox free traders in the Cabinet.

== Chinese miners in South Africa ==
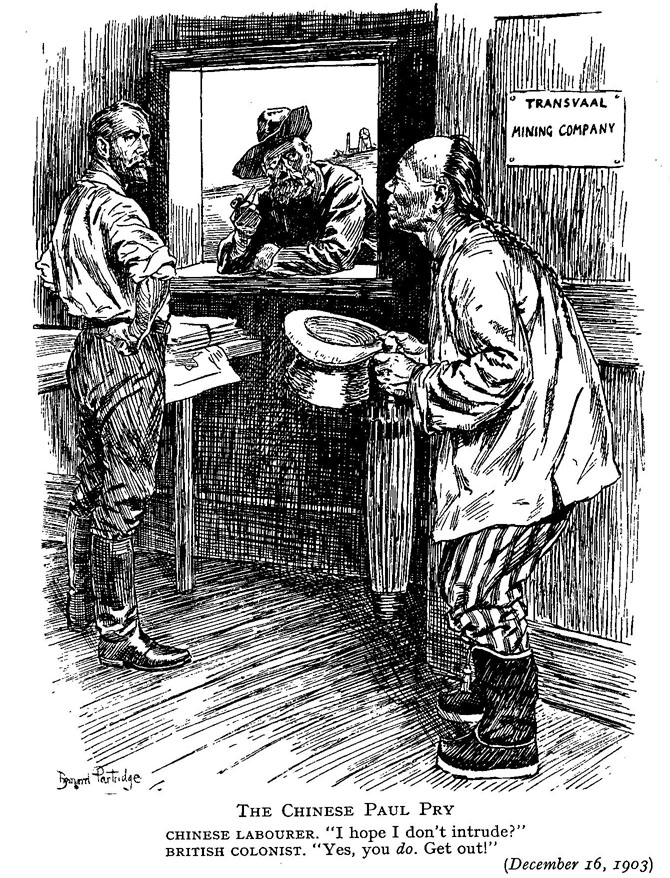
Punch cartoon, 1903. The Rand mine-owners' employment of Chinese labour on the Transvaal gold mines in British-controlled South Africa was controversial and contributed to the 1906 Liberal landslide.

After the conclusion of the Boer War, the British government sought to rebuild the South African economy which had been devastated by the war. An important part of the rebuilding effort was to get the gold mines of the Witwatersrand, the richest in history and a major cause of the war, back in production as soon as possible. Because the government decreed that white labour was too expensive and black labourers were reluctant to return to the mines, the government decided to import over 60,000 contracted workers from China.

This was deeply unpopular at the time, as popular opinion in much of the Western world, including Britain; was hostile to Chinese immigration. It also happened at a time when poverty and unemployment amongst working-class British people was at very high levels. On 26 March 1904, a demonstration against Chinese immigration to South Africa was held in Hyde Park and was attended by 80,000 people. The Parliamentary Committee of the Trades Union Congress then passed a resolution declaring that:

That this meeting consisting of all classes of citizens of London, emphatically protests against the action of the Government in granting permission to import into South Africa indentured Chinese labour under conditions of slavery, and calls upon them to protect this new colony from the greed of capitalists and the Empire from degradation.

— Yap & Leong Man (1996, p. 107)

== Fall from power ==
With his majority greatly reduced and defeat in the next election seeming inevitable, Balfour resigned as prime minister in December 1905, leading to the appointment of a minority Liberal government under Sir Henry Campbell-Bannerman. In the general election which followed in 1906, all but three members of Balfour's cabinet lost their seats, including Balfour himself.

== Cabinets ==
=== Salisbury ministry ===
Salisbury ministries
- Unionist coalition of the United Kingdom
- 1895–1900; 1900–1902
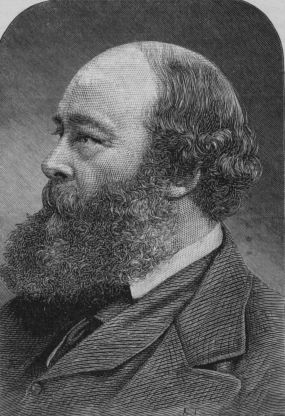
- Salisbury (1897)
- Date formed: Third: 25 June 1895; Fourth: 24 October 1900
- Date dissolved: Third: 24 October 1900; Fourth: 11 July 1902

People and organisations
- Monarch: Victoria (1895–1901); Edward VII (1901–1902)
- Prime Minister: Lord Salisbury
- Prime Minister's history: 1895–1902
- Member parties: Conservative Party; Liberal Unionist Party (1895–1902)
- Status in legislature: Minority (1895); Majority (coalition) (1895–1902)
- Opposition party: Liberal Party
- Opposition leaders: Sir William Vernon Harcourt (1896–1898); Sir Henry Campbell-Bannerman (1898–1902) in the House of Commons; Lord Rosebery (1895–1897); Lord Kimberley (1897–1902); Lord Spencer (1902) in the House of Lords

History
- Elections: 1895 general election; 1900 general election
- Legislature terms: 25th UK Parliament; 26th UK Parliament; 27th UK Parliament
- Predecessor: Rosebery ministry
- Successor: Balfour ministry

==== June 1895 to November 1900 ====
Portfolio	Minister	Took office	Left office	Party
Secretary of State for Foreign Affairs; Leader of the House of Lords	Robert Gascoyne-Cecil, 3rd Marquess of Salisbury (head of ministry)	25 June 1895	11 July 1902	Conservative
First Lord of the Treasury; Leader of the House of Commons	Arthur Balfour	25 June 1895	4 December 1905	Conservative
Lord Chancellor	Hardinge Giffard, 1st Earl of Halsbury	29 June 1895	4 December 1905	Conservative
Lord President of the Council	Spencer Cavendish, 8th Duke of Devonshire	29 June 1895	19 October 1903	Liberal Unionist
Lord Privy Seal	R. A. Cross, 1st Viscount Cross	29 June 1895	12 November 1900	Conservative
Secretary of State for the Home Department	Sir Matthew White Ridley, 5th Baronet	29 June 1895	12 November 1900	Conservative
Secretary of State for the Colonies	Joseph Chamberlain	29 June 1895	16 September 1903	Liberal Unionist
Secretary of State for War	Henry Petty-Fitzmaurice, 5th Marquess of Lansdowne	4 July 1895	12 November 1900	Liberal Unionist
Secretary of State for India	Lord George Hamilton	4 July 1895	9 October 1903	Conservative
First Lord of the Admiralty	George Goschen	1895	1900	Conservative
Chancellor of the Exchequer	Sir Michael Hicks Beach, 9th Baronet	29 June 1895	11 August 1902	Conservative
President of the Board of Trade	Charles Ritchie	29 June 1895	7 November 1900	Conservative
President of the Local Government Board	Henry Chaplin	29 June 1895	12 November 1900	Conservative
Chancellor of the Duchy of Lancaster	R. A. Cross, 1st Viscount Cross	29 June 1895	4 July 1895	Conservative
Chancellor of the Duchy of Lancaster	Henry James, 1st Baron James of Hereford	4 July 1895	11 August 1902	Liberal Unionist
First Commissioner of Works	Aretas Akers-Douglas	4 July 1895	11 August 1902	Conservative
Lord Lieutenant of Ireland	George Cadogan, 5th Earl Cadogan	29 June 1895	11 August 1902	Conservative
Lord Chancellor of Ireland	Edward Gibson, 1st Baron Ashbourne	29 June 1895	1905	Conservative
Secretary for Scotland	Alexander Bruce, 6th Lord Balfour of Burleigh	29 June 1895	9 October 1903	Conservative
President of the Board of Agriculture	Walter Long	4 July 1895	16 November 1900	Conservative

==== November 1900 to July 1902 ====
In November 1900, the Cabinet was reformed for the first time.

Portfolio	Minister	Took office	Left office	Party
Lord Privy Seal; Leader of the House of Lords	Robert Gascoyne-Cecil, 3rd Marquess of Salisbury (head of ministry)	25 June 1895	11 July 1902	Conservative
First Lord of the Treasury; Leader of the House of Commons	Arthur Balfour	25 June 1895	4 December 1905	Conservative
Lord Chancellor	Hardinge Giffard, 1st Earl of Halsbury	29 June 1895	4 December 1905	Conservative
Lord President of the Council	Spencer Cavendish, 8th Duke of Devonshire	29 June 1895	19 October 1903	Liberal Unionist
Secretary of State for the Home Department	Charles Ritchie	12 November 1900	12 July 1902	Conservative
Secretary of State for Foreign Affairs	Henry Petty-Fitzmaurice, 5th Marquess of Lansdowne	12 November 1900	4 December 1905	Liberal Unionist
Secretary of State for the Colonies	Joseph Chamberlain	29 June 1895	16 September 1903	Liberal Unionist
Secretary of State for War	St John Brodrick	12 November 1900	6 October 1903	Conservative
Secretary of State for India	Lord George Hamilton	4 July 1895	9 October 1903	Conservative
First Lord of the Admiralty	William Palmer, 2nd Earl of Selborne	1900	1905	Liberal Unionist
Chancellor of the Exchequer	Sir Michael Hicks Beach, 9th Baronet	29 June 1895	11 August 1902	Conservative
President of the Board of Trade	Gerald Balfour	12 November 1900	12 March 1905	Conservative
President of the Local Government Board	Walter Long	1900	1905	Conservative
Chancellor of the Duchy of Lancaster	Henry James, 1st Baron James of Hereford	4 July 1895	11 August 1902	Liberal Unionist
First Commissioner of Works	Aretas Akers-Douglas	4 July 1895	11 August 1902	Conservative
Lord Lieutenant of Ireland	George Cadogan, 5th Earl Cadogan	29 June 1895	11 August 1902	Conservative
Lord Chancellor of Ireland	Edward Gibson, 1st Baron Ashbourne	29 June 1895	1905	Conservative
Secretary for Scotland	Alexander Bruce, 6th Lord Balfour of Burleigh	29 June 1895	9 October 1903	Conservative
President of the Board of Agriculture	Robert William Hanbury	16 November 1900	28 April 1903	Conservative

=== Balfour ministry ===
Balfour ministry
- 1902–1905
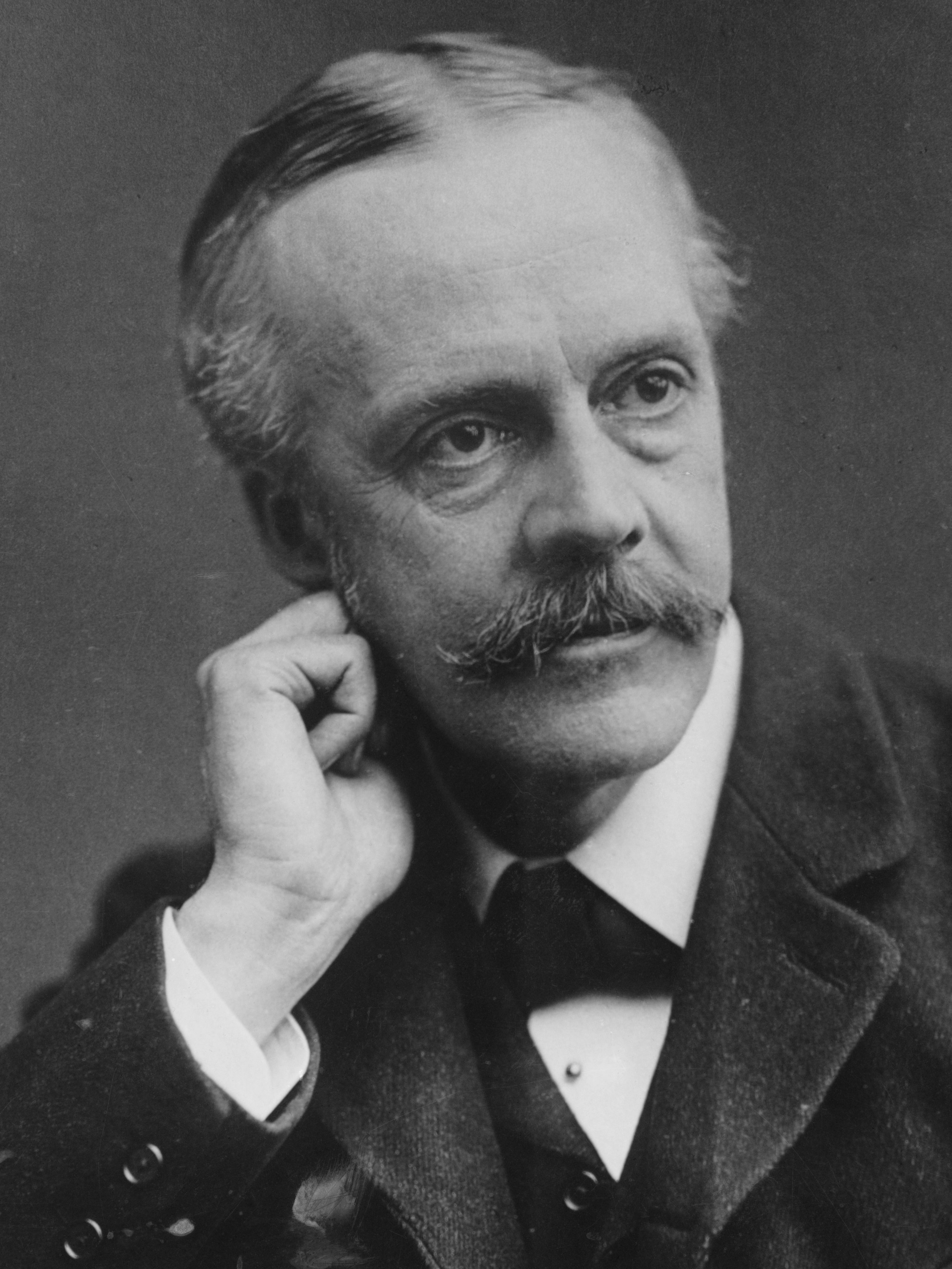
- Arthur Balfour
- Date formed: 12 July 1902
- Date dissolved: 4 December 1905

People and organisations
- Monarch: Edward VII
- Prime Minister: Arthur Balfour
- Member parties: Conservative Party; Liberal Unionist Party
- Status in legislature: Majority (coalition)
- Opposition party: Liberal Party
- Opposition leaders: Sir Henry Campbell-Bannerman in the House of Commons; Lord Spencer (1902–1905); Lord Ripon (1905) in the House of Lords

History
- Legislature terms: 27th UK Parliament
- Predecessor: Fourth Salisbury ministry
- Successor: Campbell-Bannerman ministry

Portfolio	Minister	Took office	Left office	Party
First Lord of the Treasury; Lord Privy Seal; Leader of the House of Commons	Arthur Balfour (head of ministry)	12 July 1902	4 December 1905	Conservative
Lord Chancellor	Hardinge Giffard, 1st Earl of Halsbury	29 June 1895	4 December 1905	Conservative
Lord President of the Council; Leader of the House of Lords	Spencer Cavendish, 8th Duke of Devonshire	29 June 1895	19 October 1903	Liberal Unionist
Lord President of the Council	Charles Vane-Tempest-Stewart, 6th Marquess of Londonderry	19 October 1903	11 December 1905	Conservative
Leader of the House of Lords	Henry Petty-Fitzmaurice, 5th Marquess of Lansdowne	13 October 1903	4 December 1905	Liberal Unionist
Secretary of State for the Home Department	Aretas Akers-Douglas	12 July 1902	5 December 1905	Conservative
Secretary of State for Foreign Affairs	Henry Petty-Fitzmaurice, 5th Marquess of Lansdowne	12 November 1900	4 December 1905	Liberal Unionist
Secretary of State for the Colonies	Joseph Chamberlain	29 June 1895	16 September 1903	Liberal Unionist
Secretary of State for the Colonies	Alfred Lyttelton	11 October 1903	4 December 1905	Liberal Unionist
Secretary of State for War	St John Brodrick	12 November 1900	6 October 1903	Conservative
Secretary of State for War	H. O. Arnold-Forster	6 October 1903	4 December 1905	Liberal Unionist
Secretary of State for India	Lord George Hamilton	4 July 1895	9 October 1903	Conservative
Secretary of State for India	St John Brodrick	9 October 1903	4 December 1905	Conservative
First Lord of the Admiralty	William Palmer, 2nd Earl of Selborne	1900	1905	Liberal Unionist
Chancellor of the Exchequer	Charles Ritchie	11 August 1902	9 October 1903	Conservative
Chancellor of the Exchequer	Austen Chamberlain	9 October 1903	4 December 1905	Liberal Unionist
President of the Board of Trade	Gerald Balfour	12 November 1900	12 March 1905	Conservative
President of the Board of Trade	James Gascoyne-Cecil, 4th Marquess of Salisbury	12 March 1905	4 December 1905	Conservative
Secretary for Scotland	Alexander Bruce, 6th Lord Balfour of Burleigh	29 June 1895	9 October 1903	Conservative
Secretary for Scotland	Andrew Murray	9 October 1903	2 February 1905	Conservative
Secretary for Scotland	John Hope, 1st Marquess of Linlithgow	2 February 1905	4 December 1905	Conservative
Chief Secretary for Ireland	George Wyndham	9 November 1900	12 March 1905	Conservative
Chief Secretary for Ireland	Walter Long	12 March 1905	4 December 1905	Conservative
President of the Local Government Board	Walter Long	1900	1905	Conservative
President of the Local Government Board	Gerald Balfour	1905	11 December 1905	Conservative
President of the Board of Agriculture	Robert William Hanbury	16 November 1900	28 April 1903	Conservative
President of the Board of Education	Charles Vane-Tempest-Stewart, 6th Marquess of Londonderry	11 August 1902	4 December 1905	Conservative
Lord Chancellor of Ireland	Edward Gibson, 1st Baron Ashbourne	29 June 1895	1905	Conservative
First Commissioner of Works	Robert Windsor-Clive, 14th Baron Windsor	11 August 1902	4 December 1905	Conservative
Postmaster General	Austen Chamberlain	11 August 1902	9 October 1903	Liberal Unionist

==== Changes ====
- May 1903 – Lord Onslow succeeds Robert William Hanbury at the Board of Agriculture.
- September to October 1903 –
  - Lord Londonderry succeeds the Duke of Devonshire as Lord President. Londonderry remains President of the Board of Education.
  - Lord Lansdowne succeeds Devonshire as Leader of the House of Lords. Lansdowne remains Foreign Secretary.
  - Lord Salisbury succeeds Arthur Balfour as Lord Privy Seal.
  - Austen Chamberlain succeeds Charles Ritchie at the Exchequer. Chamberlain's successor as Postmaster General is not in the Cabinet.
  - Alfred Lyttelton succeeds Joseph Chamberlain as Colonial Secretary.
  - St John Brodrick succeeds Lord George Hamilton as Secretary for India.
  - H. O. Arnold-Forster succeeds Brodrick as Secretary for War.
  - Andrew Graham-Murray succeeds Lord Balfour of Burleigh as Secretary for Scotland.
- March 1905 –
  - Walter Hume Long succeeds George Wyndham as Irish Secretary.
  - Gerald Balfour succeeds Long at the Local Government Board.
  - Lord Salisbury succeeds Balfour at the Board of Trade. Salisbury remains Lord Privy Seal.
  - Lord Cawdor succeeds Lord Selborne at the Admiralty.
  - Ailwyn Fellowes succeeds Lord Onslow at the Board of Agriculture.

== List of ministers ==
Office	Name	Date
Prime minister (Note: The position of Prime Minister was not a formal ministerial office.)	Robert Gascoyne-Cecil, 3rd Marquess of Salisbury (Note: Also served as Leader of the House of Lords.)	25 Jun 1895 – 11 Jul 1902
Prime minister	Arthur Balfour	12 Jul 1902 – 4 Dec 1905
First Lord of the Treasury; Leader of the House of Commons	Arthur Balfour	29 Jun 1895 – 4 Dec 1905
Chancellor of the Exchequer	Sir Michael Hicks Beach, 9th Baronet	29 Jun 1895
Chancellor of the Exchequer	Charles Ritchie	11 Aug 1902
Chancellor of the Exchequer	Austen Chamberlain	9 Oct 1903
Parliamentary Secretary to the Treasury; Government Chief Whip in the House of Commons	Sir William Walrond	29 Jun 1895
Parliamentary Secretary to the Treasury; Government Chief Whip in the House of Commons	Sir Alexander Acland-Hood	8 Aug 1902
Financial Secretary to the Treasury	Robert William Hanbury	29 Jun 1895
Financial Secretary to the Treasury	Austen Chamberlain	7 Nov 1900
Financial Secretary to the Treasury	William Hayes Fisher	8 Aug 1902
Financial Secretary to the Treasury	Arthur Elliot	10 Apr 1903
Financial Secretary to the Treasury	Victor Cavendish	9 Oct 1903
Junior Lords of the Treasury	Henry Torrens Anstruther	6 Jul 1895 – 11 Oct 1903
Junior Lords of the Treasury	William Hayes Fisher	6 Jul 1895 – 8 Aug 1902
Junior Lords of the Treasury	Edward Stanley, Baron Stanley	6 Jul 1895 – 7 Nov 1900
Junior Lords of the Treasury	Ailwyn Fellowes	7 Nov 1900 – 15 Mar 1905
Junior Lords of the Treasury	Henry Forster	8 Aug 1902 – 4 Dec 1905
Junior Lords of the Treasury	David Lindsay, Baron Balniel	11 Oct 1903 – 4 Dec 1905
Junior Lords of the Treasury	Lord Edmund Talbot	16 Jun 1905 – 4 Dec 1905
Lord Chancellor	Hardinge Giffard, 1st Baron Halsbury (Note: Halsbury was created the 1st Earl of Halsbury on 19 January 1898.)	29 Jun 1895
Lord President of the Council	Spencer Cavendish, 8th Duke of Devonshire (Note: Devonshire also served as Leader of the House of Lords from 12 July 1902 to 13 October 1903.)	29 Jun 1895
Lord President of the Council	Charles Vane-Tempest-Stewart, 6th Marquess of Londonderry	19 Oct 1903
Lord Privy Seal	R. A. Cross, 1st Viscount Cross	29 Jun 1895
Lord Privy Seal	Robert Gascoyne-Cecil, 3rd Marquess of Salisbury	12 Nov 1900
Lord Privy Seal	Arthur Balfour	14 Jul 1902
Lord Privy Seal	James Gascoyne-Cecil, 4th Marquess of Salisbury	17 Oct 1903
Secretary of State for the Home Department	Sir Matthew White Ridley, 5th Baronet	29 Jun 1895
Secretary of State for the Home Department	Charles Thomson Ritchie	12 Nov 1900
Secretary of State for the Home Department	Aretas Akers-Douglas	11 Aug 1902
Under-Secretary of State for the Home Department	Jesse Collings	3 Jul 1895
Under-Secretary of State for the Home Department	Thomas Cochrane	11 Aug 1902
Secretary of State for Foreign Affairs	Robert Gascoyne-Cecil, 3rd Marquess of Salisbury	29 Jun 1895
Secretary of State for Foreign Affairs	Henry Petty-Fitzmaurice, 5th Marquess of Lansdowne (Note: Lansdowne also served as Leader of the House of Lords from 13 October 1903 to 4 December 1905)	12 Nov 1900
Under-Secretary of State for Foreign Affairs	George Curzon	20 Jun 1895
Under-Secretary of State for Foreign Affairs	St John Brodrick	15 Oct 1898
Under-Secretary of State for Foreign Affairs	James Gascoyne-Cecil, Viscount Cranborne (Note: Cranborne succeeded as the 4th Marquess of Salisbury on 22 August 1903.)	12 Nov 1900
Under-Secretary of State for Foreign Affairs	Henry Percy, Earl Percy	9 Oct 1903
Secretary of State for War	Henry Petty-Fitzmaurice, 5th Marquess of Lansdowne	4 Jul 1895
Secretary of State for War	St John Brodrick	12 Nov 1900
Secretary of State for War	H. O. Arnold-Forster	12 Oct 1903
Under-Secretary of State for War	St John Brodrick	4 Jul 1895
Under-Secretary of State for War	George Wyndham	10 Oct 1898
Under-Secretary of State for War	George Somerset, 3rd Baron Raglan	13 Nov 1900
Under-Secretary of State for War	Albert Yorke, 6th Earl of Hardwicke	8 Aug 1902
Under-Secretary of State for War	Richard Hely-Hutchinson, 6th Earl of Donoughmore	12 Oct 1903
Financial Secretary to the War Office	Joseph Powell Williams	3 Jul 1895
Financial Secretary to the War Office	Edward Stanley, Baron Stanley	1 Jan 1901
Financial Secretary to the War Office	William Bromley-Davenport	12 Oct 1903
Secretary of State for the Colonies	Joseph Chamberlain	29 Jun 1895
Secretary of State for the Colonies	Alfred Lyttelton	9 Oct 1903
Under-Secretary of State for the Colonies	William Palmer, 2nd Earl of Selborne	28 Jun 1895
Under-Secretary of State for the Colonies	William Onslow, 4th Earl of Onslow	26 Nov 1900
Under-Secretary of State for the Colonies	Charles Spencer-Churchill, 9th Duke of Marlborough	22 Jul 1903
Secretary of State for India	Lord George Hamilton	4 Jul 1895
Secretary of State for India	St John Brodrick	9 Oct 1903
Under-Secretary of State for India	William Onslow, 4th Earl of Onslow	5 Jul 1895
Under-Secretary of State for India	Albert Yorke, 6th Earl of Hardwicke	17 Jan 1901
Under-Secretary of State for India	Henry Percy, Earl Percy	18 Aug 1902
Under-Secretary of State for India	vacant	29 Nov 1904
Under-Secretary of State for India	Thomas Thynne, 5th Marquess of Bath	20 Jan 1905
First Lord of the Admiralty	George Goschen	29 Jun 1895
First Lord of the Admiralty	William Palmer, 2nd Earl of Selborne	12 Nov 1900
First Lord of the Admiralty	Frederick Campbell, 3rd Earl Cawdor	27 Mar 1905
Parliamentary and Financial Secretary to the Admiralty	William Ellison-Macartney	29 Jun 1895
Parliamentary and Financial Secretary to the Admiralty	H. O. Arnold-Forster	7 Nov 1900
Parliamentary and Financial Secretary to the Admiralty	E. G. Pretyman	11 Oct 1903
Civil Lord of the Admiralty	Austen Chamberlain	6 Jul 1895
Civil Lord of the Admiralty	E. G. Pretyman	7 Nov 1900
Civil Lord of the Admiralty	Arthur Lee	11 Oct 1903
President of the Board of Agriculture	Walter Long	4 Jul 1895
President of the Board of Agriculture	Robert William Hanbury	16 Nov 1900
President of the Board of Agriculture	William Onslow, 4th Earl of Onslow	20 May 1903
President of the Board of Agriculture	Ailwyn Fellowes	14 Mar 1905
President of the Board of Education	Spencer Cavendish, 8th Duke of Devonshire	3 Mar 1900
President of the Board of Education	Charles Vane-Tempest-Stewart, 6th Marquess of Londonderry	11 Aug 1902
Parliamentary Secretary to the Board of Education	Sir William Anson, 3rd Baronet	11 Aug 1902
Chief Secretary for Ireland	Gerald Balfour	4 Jul 1895
Chief Secretary for Ireland	George Wyndham	9 Nov 1900
Chief Secretary for Ireland	Walter Long	12 Mar 1905
Lord Lieutenant of Ireland	George Cadogan, 5th Earl Cadogan	29 Jun 1895
Lord Lieutenant of Ireland	William Ward, 2nd Earl of Dudley	11 Aug 1902
Lord Chancellor of Ireland	Edward Gibson, 1st Baron Ashbourne	29 Jun 1895
Chancellor of the Duchy of Lancaster	R. A. Cross, 1st Viscount Cross	29 Jun 1895
Chancellor of the Duchy of Lancaster	Henry James, 1st Baron James of Hereford	4 Jul 1895
Chancellor of the Duchy of Lancaster	Sir William Walrond	11 Aug 1902
President of the Local Government Board	Henry Chaplin	29 Jun 1895
President of the Local Government Board	Walter Long	12 Nov 1900
President of the Local Government Board	Gerald Balfour	14 Mar 1905
Parliamentary Secretary to the Local Government Board	Thomas Russell	30 Jun 1895
Parliamentary Secretary to the Local Government Board	John Lawson	12 Nov 1900
Parliamentary Secretary to the Local Government Board	Arthur Frederick Jeffreys	27 Jun 1905
Postmaster General	Henry Fitzalan-Howard, 15th Duke of Norfolk	6 Jul 1895
Postmaster General	Charles Vane-Tempest-Stewart, 6th Marquess of Londonderry (Note: Londonderry entered the Cabinet on 7 November 1900.)	10 Apr 1900
Postmaster General	Austen Chamberlain	11 Aug 1902
Postmaster General	Edward Stanley, Baron Stanley	9 Oct 1903
Secretary for Scotland	Alexander Bruce, 6th Lord Balfour of Burleigh	29 Jun 1895
Secretary for Scotland	Andrew Murray	9 Oct 1903
Secretary for Scotland	John Hope, 1st Marquess of Linlithgow	2 Feb 1905
President of the Board of Trade	Charles Ritchie	29 Jun 1895
President of the Board of Trade	Gerald Balfour	12 Nov 1900
President of the Board of Trade	James Gascoyne-Cecil, 4th Marquess of Salisbury	14 Mar 1905
Parliamentary Secretary to the Board of Trade	William Ward, 2nd Earl of Dudley	29 Jun 1895
Parliamentary Secretary to the Board of Trade	Bonar Law	8 Aug 1902
First Commissioner of Works	Aretas Akers-Douglas	4 Jul 1895
First Commissioner of Works	Robery Windsor-Clive, 14th Baron Windsor	11 Aug 1902
Vice-President of the Committee on Education (Note: Office abolished on 8 August 1902 and replaced by that of Secretary to the Board of Education.)	Sir John Eldon Gorst	4 Jul 1895
Paymaster General	John Hope, 7th Earl of Hopetoun	16 Jul 1895
Paymaster General	Charles Spencer-Churchill, 9th Duke of Marlborough	1899
Paymaster General	Sir Savile Crossley	Nov 1902
Attorney General	Sir Richard Webster	8 Jul 1895
Attorney General	Sir Robert Finlay	11 May 1900
Solicitor General	Sir Robert Finlay	30 Aug 1895
Solicitor General	Sir Edward Carson	11 May 1900
Lord Advocate	Sir Charles Pearson	11 Jul 1895
Lord Advocate	Andrew Murray	14 May 1896
Lord Advocate	Charles Dickson	17 Oct 1903
Solicitor General for Scotland	Andrew Murray	11 Jul 1895
Solicitor General for Scotland	Charles Dickson	14 May 1896
Solicitor General for Scotland	David Dundas	17 Oct 1903
Solicitor General for Scotland	Edward Theodore Salvesen	2 Feb 1905
Solicitor General for Scotland	James Avon Clyde	17 Oct 1905
Attorney-General for Ireland	John Atkinson	8 Jul 1895
Solicitor-General for Ireland	William Kenny	28 Aug 1895
Solicitor-General for Ireland	Dunbar Barton	28 Aug 1895
Solicitor-General for Ireland	George Wright	30 Jan 1900
Solicitor-General for Ireland	James Campbell	8 Jul 1903
Lord Steward of the Household	Sidney Herbert, 14th Earl of Pembroke	16 Jul 1895
Lord Chamberlain of the Household	Edward Bootle-Wilbraham, 1st Earl of Lathom	16 Jul 1895
Lord Chamberlain of the Household	John Hope, 7th Earl of Hopetoun	7 Dec 1898
Lord Chamberlain of the Household	Edward Villiers, 5th Earl of Clarendon	21 Sep 1900
Vice-Chamberlain of the Household	Ailwyn Fellowes	10 Jul 1895
Vice-Chamberlain of the Household	Sir Alexander Acland-Hood	3 Dec 1900
Vice-Chamberlain of the Household	Frederick Glyn, 4th Baron Wolverton	17 Nov 1902
Master of the Horse	William Cavendish-Bentinck, 6th Duke of Portland	16 Jul 1895
Treasurer of the Household	George Osborne, Marquess of Carmarthen (Note: Carmarthen succeeded as the 10th Duke of Leeds on 23 December 1895.)	10 Jul 1895
Treasurer of the Household	Richard Curzon, Viscount Curzon	11 Feb 1896
Treasurer of the Household	Victor Cavendish	4 Dec 1900
Treasurer of the Household	James Hamilton, Marquess of Hamilton	13 Oct 1903
Comptroller of the Household	Lord Arthur Hill	10 Jul 1895
Comptroller of the Household	Arthur Annesley, 11th Viscount Valentia	19 Oct 1898
Captain of the Gentlemen-at-Arms	Henry Strutt, 2nd Baron Belper	16 Jul 1895
Captain of the Yeomen of the Guard; Government Chief Whip in the House of Lords	William Pery, 3rd Earl of Limerick	16 Jul 1895
Captain of the Yeomen of the Guard; Government Chief Whip in the House of Lords	William Waldegrave, 9th Earl Waldegrave	26 Aug 1896
Master of the Buckhounds (Note: Office abolished in 1900.)	George Coventry, 9th Earl of Coventry	16 Jul 1895
Master of the Buckhounds	Charles Cavendish, 3rd Baron Chesham	1 Nov 1900
Mistress of the Robes	Louisa Montagu Douglas Scott, Duchess of Buccleuch	16 Jul 1895
Lords-in-Waiting	Victor Spencer, 3rd Baron Churchill	16 Jul 1895 – 4 Dec 1905
Lords-in-Waiting	George Harris, 4th Baron Harris	16 Jul 1895 – 4 Dec 1900
Lords-in-Waiting	John Henniker-Major, 5th Baron Henniker	16 Jul 1895 – 1 Nov 1895
Lords-in-Waiting	John Lawrence, 2nd Baron Lawrence	16 Jul 1895 – 4 Dec 1905
Lords-in-Waiting	Uchter Knox, 5th Earl of Ranfurly	16 Jul 1895 – 21 Apr 1897
Lords-in-Waiting	William Waldegrave, 9th Earl Waldegrave	16 Jul 1895 – 9 Sep 1896
Lords-in-Waiting	Edward Villiers, 5th Earl of Clarendon	17 Jul 1895 – 30 Oct 1900
Lords-in-Waiting	Alexander Hood, 1st Viscount Bridport	30 Jun 1884 – 18 Feb 1901
Lords-in-Waiting	Algernon Keith-Falconer, 9th Earl of Kintore	1 Nov 1895 – 4 Dec 1905
Lords-in-Waiting	William Bagot, 4th Baron Bagot	9 Sep 1896 – 2 Jul 1901
Lords-in-Waiting	Rudolph Feilding, 9th Earl of Denbigh	22 Apr 1897 – 4 Dec 1905
Lords-in-Waiting	Richard Curzon, 4th Earl Howe	30 Oct 1900 – 1 Oct 1903
Lords-in-Waiting	Lloyd Tyrell-Kenyon, 4th Baron Kenyon	4 Dec 1900 – 4 Dec 1905
Lords-in-Waiting	Charles Hay, 20th Earl of Erroll	19 Oct 1903 – 4 Dec 1905

== Notes ==
Preceded by Rosebery ministry	Government of the United Kingdom; 1895–1905	Succeeded by Campbell-Bannerman ministry
