= George Dundas =

George Dundas may refer to:

- George Dundas (1690–1762), MP for Linlithgowshire 1722–1727 and 1741–1743
- George Dundas (Royal Navy officer) (1778–1834), Royal Navy admiral and member of parliament for Richmond, and for Orkney & Shetland
- George Dundas (colonial administrator) (1819–1880), Scottish colonial administrator and member of parliament for Linlithgowshire
- George Dundas, Lord Manor (1802–1869), Scottish judge, Senator of the College of Justice
- Sir George Whyte Melville Dundas, 5th Baronet (1856–1934), of the Dundas baronets

== See also ==
- Dundas (surname)
