= Henry Hall (Egyptologist) =

English Egyptologist and historian

Henry R. H. Hall
- Born: 30 September 1873
- Died: 13 October 1930 (aged 57); London, UK
- Education: St John's College, Oxford
- Known for: his excavations in Egypt and Mesopotamia, being Keeper of the Department of Egyptian and Assyrian Antiquities at the British Museum
- Father: Sydney Prior Hall
- Scientific career
- Fields: Egyptology, Assyriology, archaeology
- Workplaces: British Academy, Egypt Exploration Society, Society of Antiquaries of London

Henry Reginald Holland Hall MBE, FBA, FSA (30 September 1873 – 13 October 1930) was an English Egyptologist and historian. In life, he was normally referred to as Harry Reginald Hall.

== Early life ==
Henry R.H. Hall was the son of Sir Sydney Hall, MVO, MA, a portrait painter and illustrator for The Graphic newspaper, and his wife Hannah Holland. He went to Merchant Taylors' School, London and showed an interest in history and ancient Egypt from an early age. By the age of 11 he wrote a history of Persia, and by 16 he had gained some knowledge of the ancient Egyptian language.

Hall studied classics at St John's College, Oxford, as well as Egyptian history and language under the tutelage of Egyptologist Francis Llewellyn Griffith, gaining a BA in 1895, his MA in 1897 and later his D.Litt in 1920.

== Career ==
In 1896 he started work at the British Museum as an assistant to E. A. Wallis Budge, becoming Assistant Keeper, Department of Egyptian and Assyrian Antiquities in 1919. On Budge's retirement in 1924, Hall became Keeper of the Department of Egyptian and Assyrian Antiquities, a post he held until his death in 1930.

He worked with Édouard Naville and Edward R. Ayrton in the excavations at Deir el-Bahri, Egypt, from 1903 to 1907, and also dug at Abydos with the Egypt Exploration Society expeditions of 1910 and 1925.

During the First World War he was attached to the military section of the press bureau, and in 1916 moved into Intelligence and was later attached to the Political Service in Mesopotamia with the rank of captain. He was twice mentioned in dispatches, and was made a Member of the Order of the British Empire.

Hall's knowledge of both Egyptology and Assyriology was valued during his time at the British Museum, and in his later years he organised the expeditions of Campbell Thompson at Nineveh and Guy Brunton in Upper Egypt. As a well-regarded scholar of Ancient Egyptian and Mesopotamian art, Hall took a key role in rearranging many of the galleries to foreground the artistic and historical sides of archaeology. During his time at British Museum Hall published several works, including: on the Coptic and Greek texts of the Christian period, a volume of a catalogue of scarabs, and six volumes on the hieroglyphic texts.

Hall's interests were not confined to Egyptology; after the war he directed the British Museum excavations at Ur and Tell Ubaid, in Mesopotamia. He travelled in Greece and western Asia, and published a variety of works on the history of these regions, in addition to pursuing an interest in Chinese antiquities.

== Personal ==
He was a forceful speaker with an encyclopaedic knowledge of his subject, and had great success in presenting archaeological discoveries to the general public. He was a frequent contributor of short articles and communications, submitting more than 100 of these to various academic journals, including the Journal of Egyptian Archaeology and the British Museum Quarterly. He also contributed chapters to Cambridge Ancient History as well as articles for Encyclopædia Britannica and Dictionary of National Biography. Later art, especially that of the last four centuries, was also one of his interests; he collected Dutch paintings of ships, and he presented to the National Portrait Gallery a collection of political and other portrait sketches made by his father. He also had interests related to the history of the Army and Navy — his acquaintance with the various types of German military buttons was of unexpected national service in the War.

In 1920 Hall was made honorary D.Litt. at Oxford and an honorary Fellow of his college in 1929. He was a Fellow of the British Academy, chairman of the Palestine Exploration Fund in 1922, and a member of Council of both the Hellenic Society and the Royal Asiatic Society.

On returning from an Egyptological seminar in Brussels, Hall caught a cold from which he did not recover, dying of pneumonia in London on 13 October 1930, at the age of 57. His service was at St Mary the Virgin, Primrose Hill, and afterwards at Golders Green Crematorium on 15 October.

== Selected bibliography ==
- Henry R.H. Hall, "The Oldest Civilization of Greece", 1901.
- Henry R.H. Hall, "Coptic and Greek Texts of the Christian Period in the British Museum", 1905, London.
- Henry R.H. Hall and L.W. King, "Egypt and Western Asia in the light of Recent Discoveries", 1907.
- Édouard Naville, Henry R.H. Hall, et al., "The Eleventh Dynasty Temple at Deir el Bahari", 3 vols., 1907–13.
- Henry R.H. Hall, "Hieroglyphic Texts in the British Museum", vols ii–vii, 1912–25, London.
- Henry R.H. Hall, "Ancient History of the Near East from the earliest Times to the Battle of Salamis", 1913.
- Henry R.H. Hall, with Édouard Naville and T.E. Peet, "Cemeteries of Abydos", vol i, 1914.
- Henry R.H. Hall, "Aegean Archaeology", 1915.
- Henry R.H. Hall, C.L. Woolley, et al., "Al 'Ubaid", 1927.
- Henry R.H. Hall, "A General Introductory Guide to the Egyptian Collections in the British Museum", 1930, London.
- Henry R.H. Hall, "Ur excavations", 1934
