= Joseph Chamberlain and Arthur Balfour =

Painting by Sydney Prior Hall

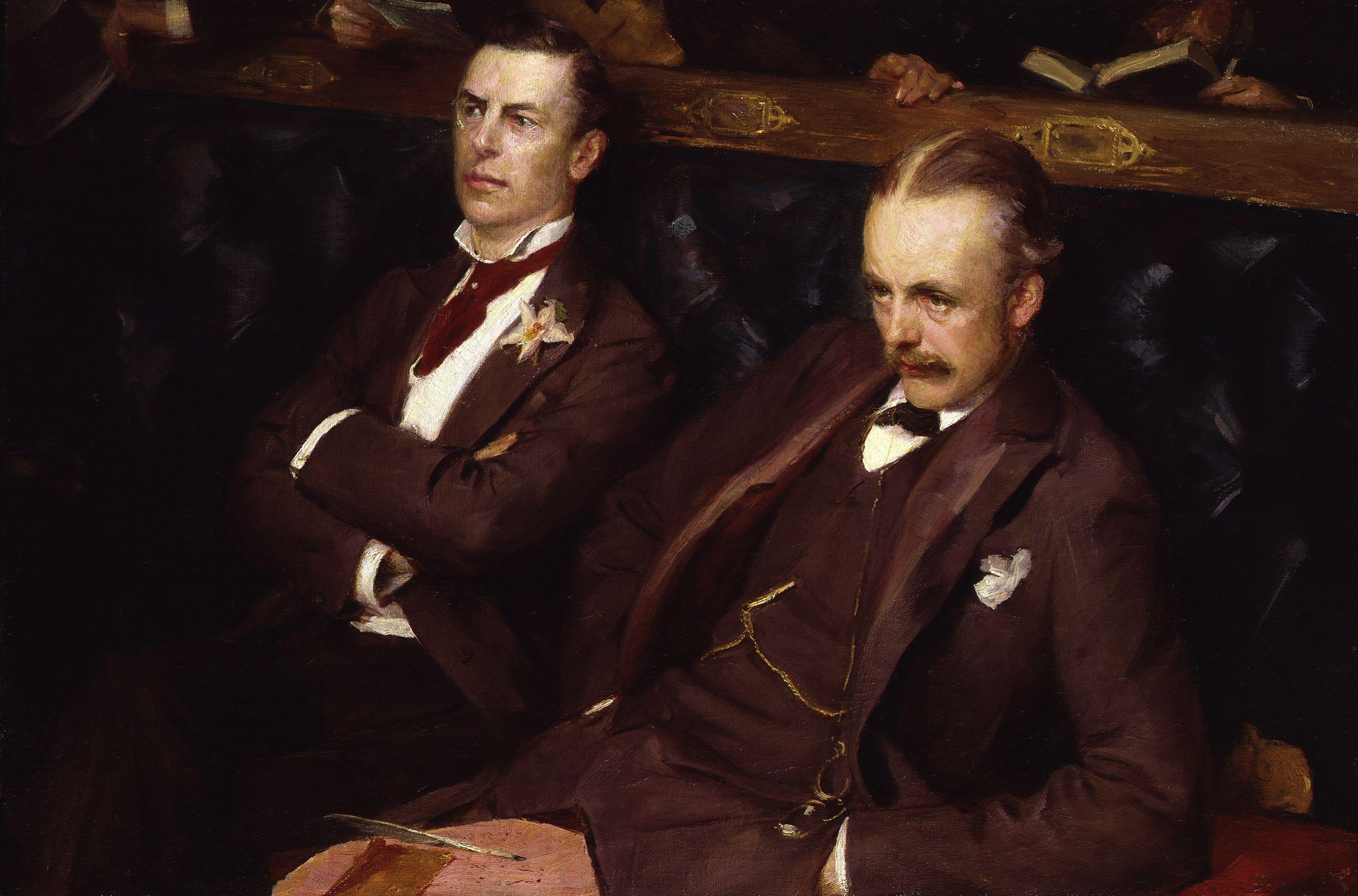
- Artist: Sydney Prior Hall
- Year: 1895
- Type: Oil on canvas, portrait painting
- Dimensions: 61 cm × 91.8 cm (24 in × 36.1 in)
- Location: National Portrait Gallery; London

Joseph Chamberlain and Arthur Balfour is an 1895 portrait painting by the English artist Sydney Prior Hall. It depicts two prominent politicians Joseph Chamberlain and Arthur Balfour seated on the government benches in the House of Commons. The two men respectively held the posts of colonial secretary and president of the Local Government Board in the Salisbury government headed by Lord Salisbury. Balfour's relationship to his uncle, Salisbury, reportedly gave rise to the express "Bob's your uncle".

The Conservative Balfour went on to serve as prime minister between 1902 and 1905 and as foreign secretary issued the Balfour Declaration during the First World War. The Liberal Unionist Chamberlain's sons Austen and Neville went on to serve as foreign secretary and prime minister respectively during the interwar years.

The painting is now in the National Portrait Gallery, in London, having been acquired in 1976.

== Bibliography ==
- Adams, Ralph James Q. Balfour: The Last Grandee. John Murray, 2007.
- Ellenberger, Nancy W. Balfour's World: Aristocracy and Political Culture at the Fin de Siècle. Boydell & Brewer, 2015.
- Ribeiro, Aileen. The Gallery of Fashion. National Portrait Gallery, 2000.
