= Henry Dundas (disambiguation) =

Henry Dundas (1742–1811) was a Scottish advocate and Tory politician.

Henry Dundas may also refer to:

- Henry Dundas, 3rd Viscount Melville (1801–1876)
- Henry Dundas, 7th Viscount Melville (1873–1935), Viscount Melville
- Henry Dundas, 8th Viscount Melville (1909–1971), Viscount Melville
- Henry Dundas (ship), several ships
