= William John Dundas =

Scottish lawyer and mathematician (1849–1921)

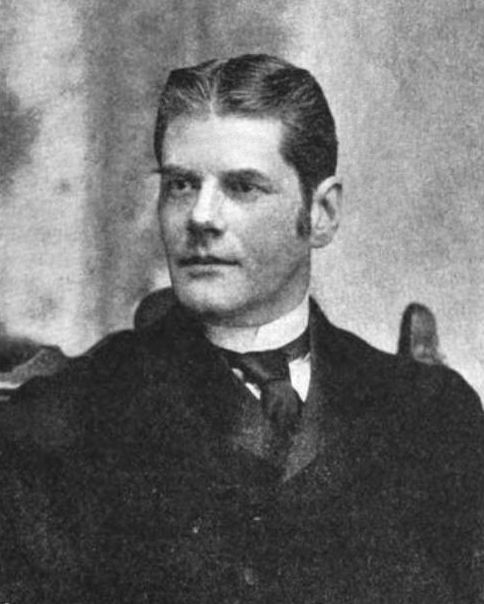
- Born: 16 March 1849; Stirlingshire, Scotland
- Died: 9 July 1921 (aged 72); Edinburgh, Scotland
- Burial place: Warriston Cemetery
- Education: Edinburgh Academy
- Occupation(s): Lawyer, mathematician
- Relatives: David Dundas (brother); James Dundas (brother)

William John Dundas, FRSE, LLD, WS (1849–1921) was a Scottish lawyer and mathematician. In later life he was a director of the Royal Bank of Scotland. He was the younger brother of James Dundas VC.

== Life ==
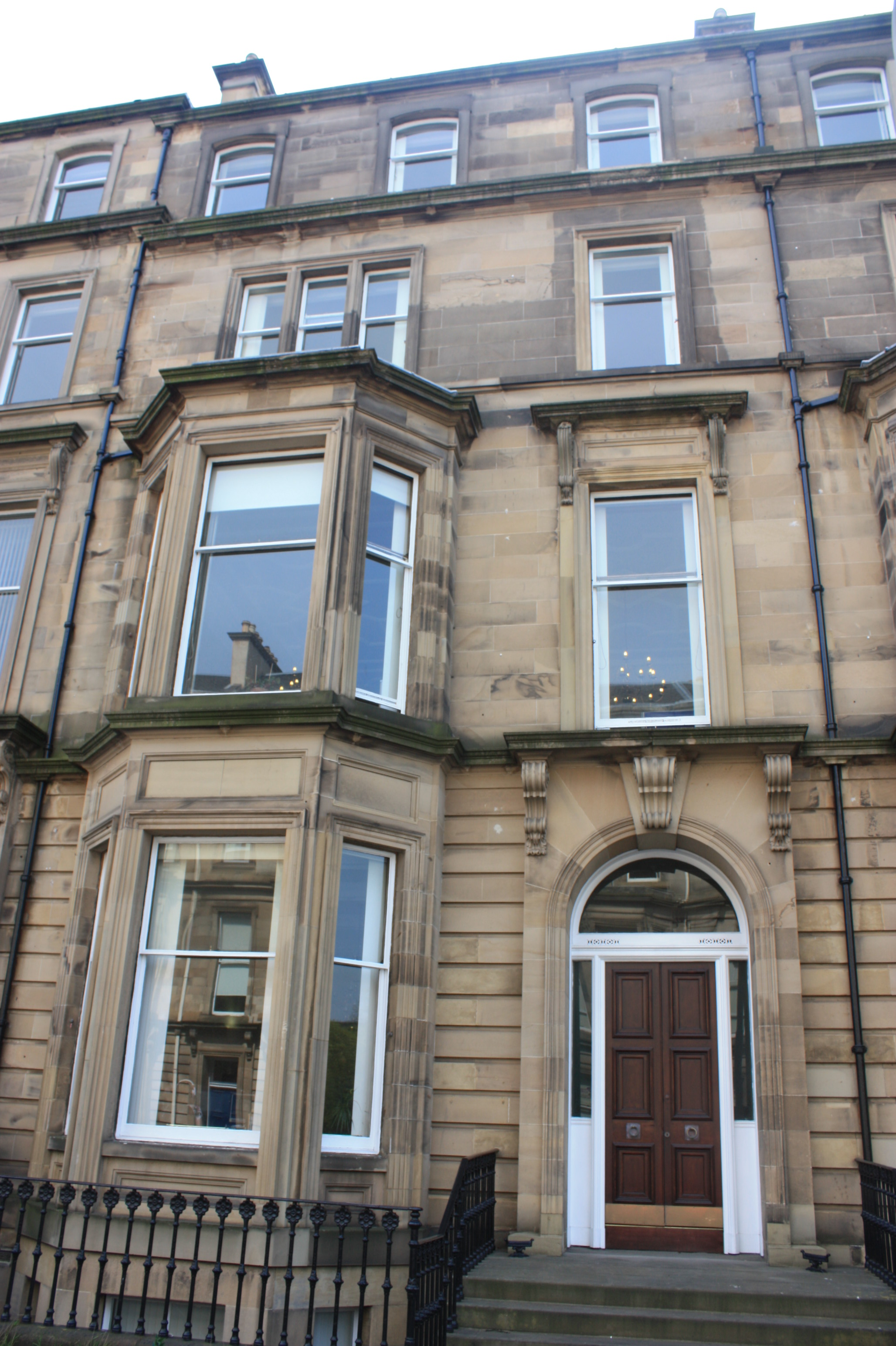
Dundas's house at 11 Drumsheugh Gardens, Edinburgh

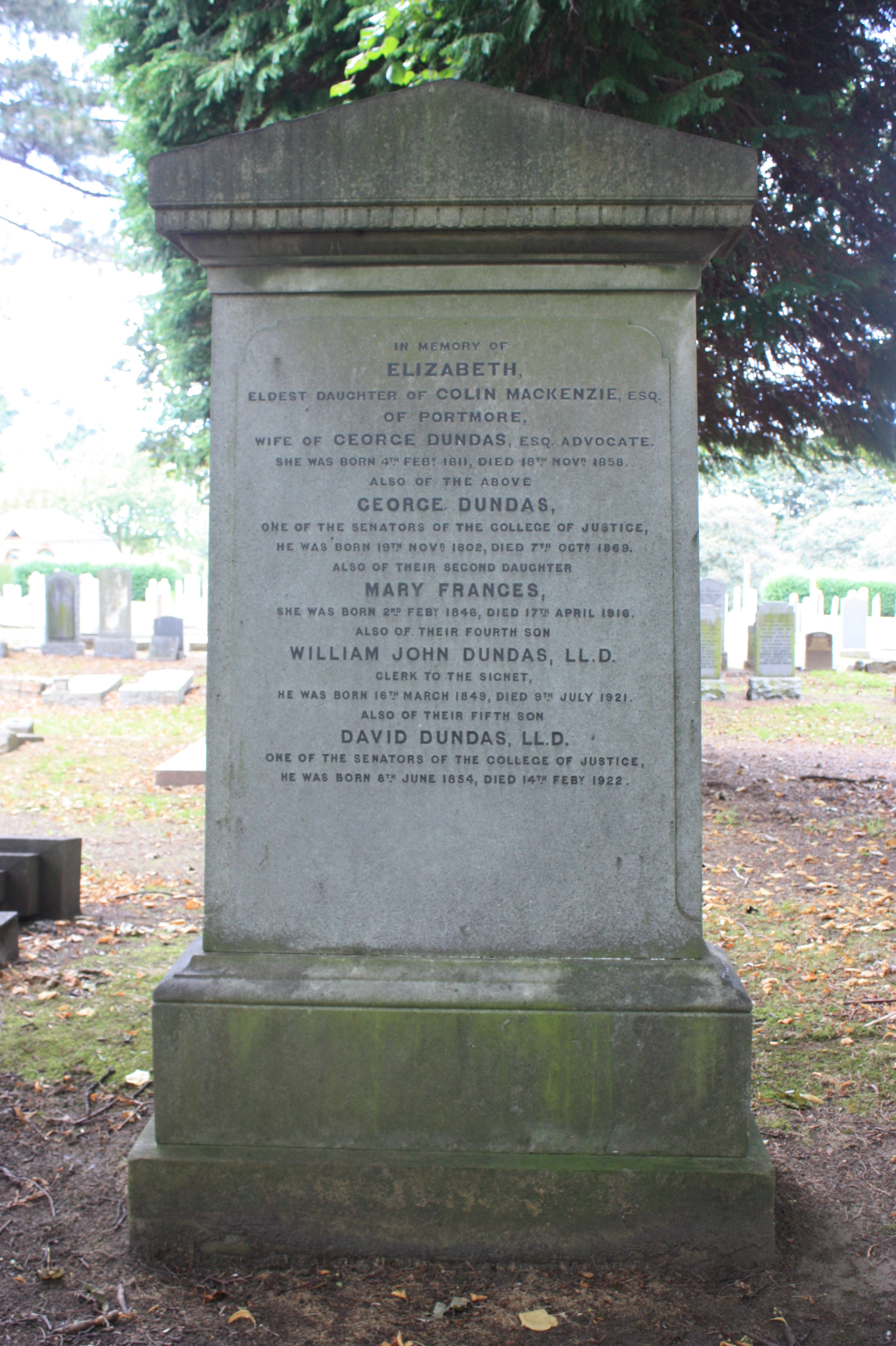
The grave of William John Dundas, Warriston Cemetery

He was born on 16 March 1849 at Ochtertyre House, Stirlingshire, the son of Elizabeth Mackenzie and George Dundas, Lord Manor. He attended Edinburgh Academy from 1859 to 1865. He was then apprenticed as a lawyer in the family firm of Dundas & Wilson. He was made a Writer to the Signet in 1871. His lawyer practice ran from 16 St Andrew Square in Edinburgh's First New Town. He served as the Crown Agent to Scotland from 1895 to 1905. From 1913, he was senior partner at Dundas & Wilson.

In 1914, the University of Edinburgh awarded him an honorary doctorate (LLD). In 1919, he was elected a Fellow of the Royal Society of Edinburgh. His proposers were John Macdonald, Lord Kingsburgh, Sir Edmund Taylor Whittaker, John Horne and Cargill Gilston Knott.

He died at home 11 Drumsheugh Gardens in Edinburgh on 9 July 1921. He is buried in Warriston Cemetery in north Edinburgh; the grave lies to the north side of the main east-west path in the upper section.

== Family ==
His brother was the military hero Captain James Dundas VC. His younger brother was David Dundas, Lord Dundas. His great nephew and namesake William John Dundas (1923–1965) was one of the three survivors on the sinking of HMS Hood by the Bismarck in 1941.
