= David Dundas =

David Dundas may refer to:

- David Dundas (musician) (born 1945), pop singer of the 1970s
- David Dundas (British Army officer), (1735–1820) military officer
- Sir David Dundas, 1st Baronet (1749–1826), distinguished surgeon
- Sir David Dundas (politician) (1799–1877), politician, Solicitor General for England and Wales and UK Privy Counsellor
- David Dundas, Lord Dundas (1854–1922), Scottish politician and judge
