= Henry Dundas (ship) =

In the late 18th and early 19th centuries, several vessels were named Henry Dundas for Henry Dundas, 1st Viscount Melville

- Henry Dundas was a HM Excise cutter stationed at Murray Firth in 1799. Her commander was James Gillespie, and she was of 60 tons (bm); she was armed with eight guns and had a crew of 17 men.
- Henry Dundas (1786 EIC ship) was an East Indiaman launched in 1786 that made six voyages for the British East India Company (EIC). She was broken up in 1804.
- Henry Dundas was built in India in 1803 and reportedly wrecked in May in the River Ganges, at the commencement of her first voyage to London. However, she appears to have been issued a letter of marque in October 1803.
- Henry Dundas, of 557 tons (bm), was launched in 1803 as Lady Shore, and later sold at the Cape where she was renamed Henry Dundas. She was lost on 3 April 1823 in the Hughli River.
- Henry Dundas was a cutter of 98 tons (bm) that received a letter of marque in 1803 and again in 1808.
- Henry Dundas (1793 ship) was a vessel launched at Kirkcaldy in 1793 that does not appear in online resources until 1810. An American privateer captured and released her in April 1814. Henry Dundas then disappeared, presumed foundered with the loss of all hands, after having been last seen on December.
- Henry Dundas was a lifeboat operating out of the Isles of Scilly in 1881.

Citations
