= George Dundas, Lord Manor =

Scottish Senator of the College of Justice

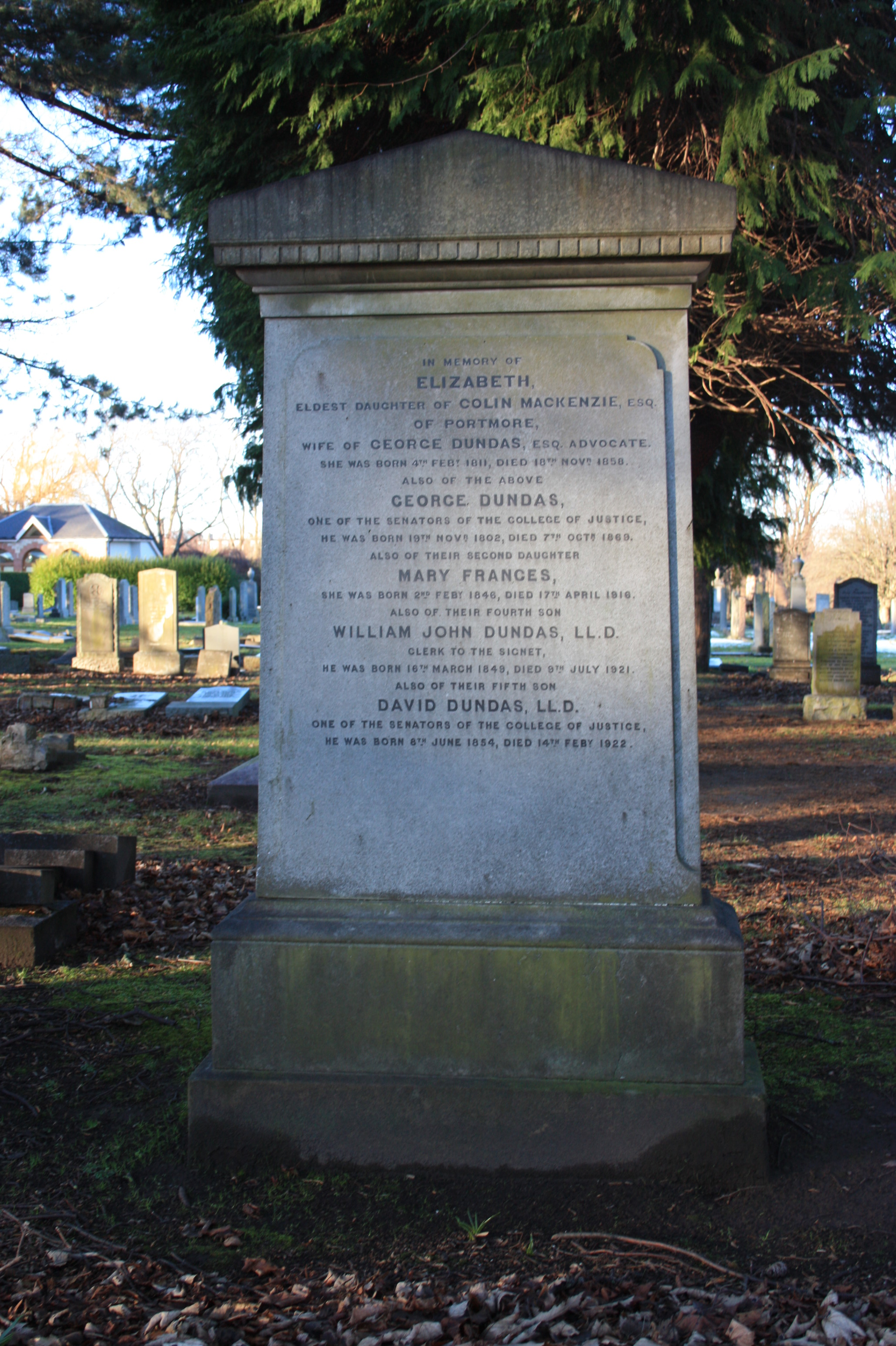
The grave of George Dundas, Lord Manor, Warriston Cemetery, Edinburgh

George Dundas, Lord Manor (19 November 1802 – 7 October 1869) was a Scottish Senator of the College of Justice.

== Life ==
He was born on 19 November 1802, the son of James Dundas of Ochtertyre, Stirlingshire, founder of the major Scottish legal firm Dundas & Wilson, and his wife Elizabeth Graham of Portmore. His siblings included David Dundas (1799–1877), Privy Counsellor, Ralph James Dundas (1795–1824) and John Dundas (1803–1873), all lawyers. William Dundas (1796–1842) died at Niagara Falls.

Dundas was descended from Dundas of Manour, and adopted the title Lord Manour when raised to a Senator of the College of Justice, but quickly changed this to Lord Manor. He resided at Ochtertyre House, coming to Edinburgh solely for his legal work.

In 1868 Dundas was placed in the Outer House of the College of Justice with David Mure, Lord Mure and Charles Baillie, Lord Jerviswoode. He died on 7 October 1869, found dead in his Edinburgh home at 9 Charlotte Square. He is buried in Warriston Cemetery on the north side of the main east–west path.

== Family ==
He married Elizabeth Mackenzie, daughter of Colin Mackenzie of Portmore. They had five sons:

- William John Dundas FRSE
- Cpt James Dundas VC
- Commander Colin Mackenzie Dundas, RN (twin to James), (1842–1902)
- David Dundas, Lord Dundas
- George Ralph Dundas

His great-grandson William John Dundas RN (1923–1965) was one of the three survivors of the sinking of HMS Hood in 1941.

== Arms ==
Coat of arms of George Dundas, Lord Manor

Crest
A dexter arm couped below the elbow holding in the hand Proper a mullet Azure.
Escutcheon
Argent a lion rampant Gules holding between the paws a human head.
Motto
Essayez
