= Mary Gow =

English painter (1851–1929)

Mary Louise Lightbody Gow
- Born: 25 December 1851; London, United Kingdom
- Died: 27 May 1929 (aged 77); London, United Kingdom
- Known for: Painting
- Spouse: Sydney Prior Hall (m. 1907)

Mary Lightbody Gow (25 December 1851 – 27 May 1929) was a British watercolourist.

== Biography ==
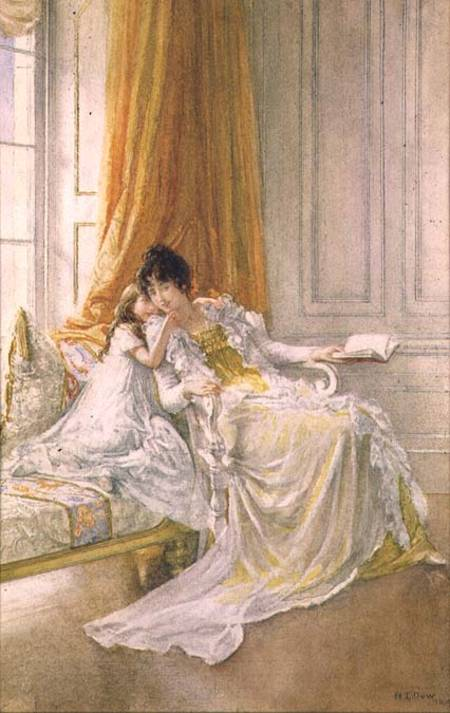
Mother and Child, 1894

Gow was the daughter of James Gow (fl. 1852–85), who painted genre and historical subjects, and the sister of the artist Andrew Carrick Gow (1848–1920). She painted mostly figures and genre in watercolours, especially young girls.

Gow studied at Heatherley's School, and exhibited widely, principally at the Royal Society of British Artists, where she sent eighteen works between 1869 and 1880. She also exhibited at the Royal Academy from 1873, and at the New Gallery in London and the Royal Birmingham Society of Artists. Her painting, Marie-Antoinette, was purchased under the Chantrey bequest in 1908. Her husband was the genre painter Sydney Prior Hall (1842–1922) whom she married in 1907.

Gow exhibited her work at the Palace of Fine Arts at the 1893 World's Columbian Exposition in Chicago, Illinois. Her work Mother and Child was included in the book Women Painters of the World. She was made a member of the Royal Institute of Painters in Water Colours in 1875.

== Bibliography ==
- Chamot, Mary, Farr, Dennis and Butlin, Martin, The Modern British Paintings, Drawings and Sculpture, London 1964, I
