= Dundas =

Dundas may refer to:

== Places ==
=== Australia ===
- Dundas, New South Wales
- Dundas, Queensland, a locality in the Somerset Region
- Dundas, Tasmania
- Dundas, Western Australia
- Fort Dundas, a settlement in the Northern Territory 1824–1828
- Shire of Dundas, Western Australia

=== Bahamas ===
- Dundas Town, Abaco Islands

=== Canada ===
- Dundas Island (British Columbia), the largest of the Dundas Islands
- Dundas Island (Nunavut)
- Dundas Parish, New Brunswick

==== Ontario ====
- Dundas, Ontario
  - Dundas station (Dundas, Ontario), a former railway station in Dundas
- Dundas County, Ontario
- Dundas Street

Toronto

- Sankofa Square, (formerly Yonge-Dundas Square) a public square in downtown Toronto
- TMU station, (formerly Dundas station) a subway station on Dundas Street
- Dundas West station, another subway station on Dundas Street

=== Greenland ===
- Dundas, Greenland, a former settlement at the trading place established by Knud Rasmussen and Peter Freuchen in 1910 in North Star Bay

=== Hong Kong ===
- Dundas Street, Hong Kong

=== New Zealand ===
- Dundas Island, New Zealand

=== United Kingdom ===
- Dundas Aqueduct, Wiltshire, England
- Port Dundas, Glasgow, Scotland

=== United States ===
- Dundas, Minnesota
- Dundas, Ohio
- Dundas, Virginia
- Dundas, Wisconsin
- Dundas Castle (Roscoe, New York)

== People ==
- Dundas (surname)

== Other ==
- Charlotte Dundas, the first practical steamboat
- Clan Dundas, a Scottish clan
- Dundas Castle, near Edinburgh
- Dundas Cactus Festival, an event held in Dundas, Ontario, Canada
- Dundas Data Visualization, a commercial software company from Ontario, Canada.
