= James Dundas (VC) =

Scottish Victoria Cross recipient (1842–1879)

- Born: 10 September 1842; Edinburgh, Scotland
- Died: 23 December 1879 (aged 37); Sherpur, Afghanistan
- Military career
- Allegiance: United Kingdom
- Branch: British Indian Army; British Army
- Rank: Captain
- Units: Bengal Engineers; Royal Engineers
- Conflicts: Bhutan War; Second Anglo-Afghan War
- Awards: Victoria Cross

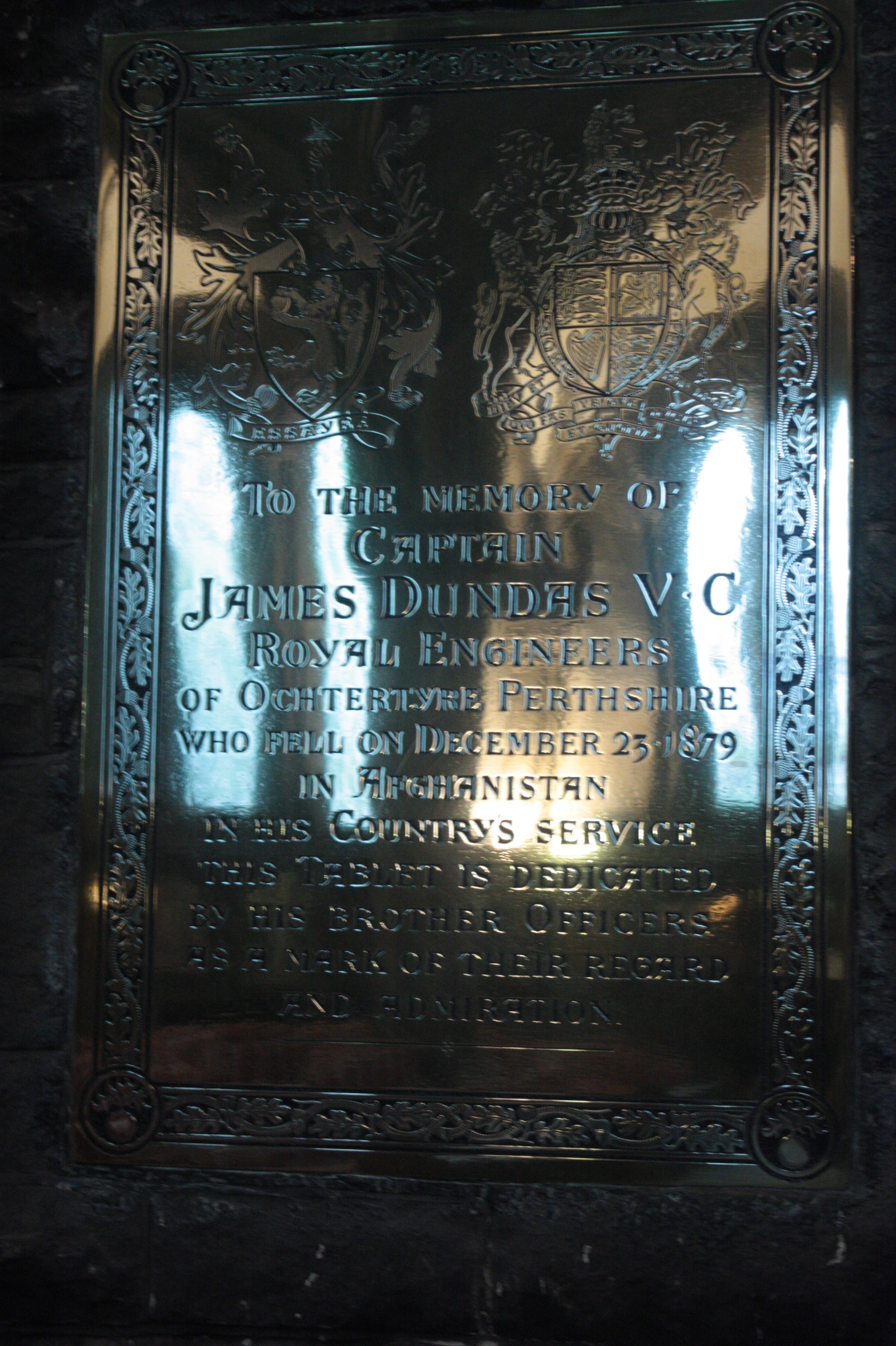
The memorial plaque to James Dundas VC in St Mary's Episcopal Cathedral in Edinburgh

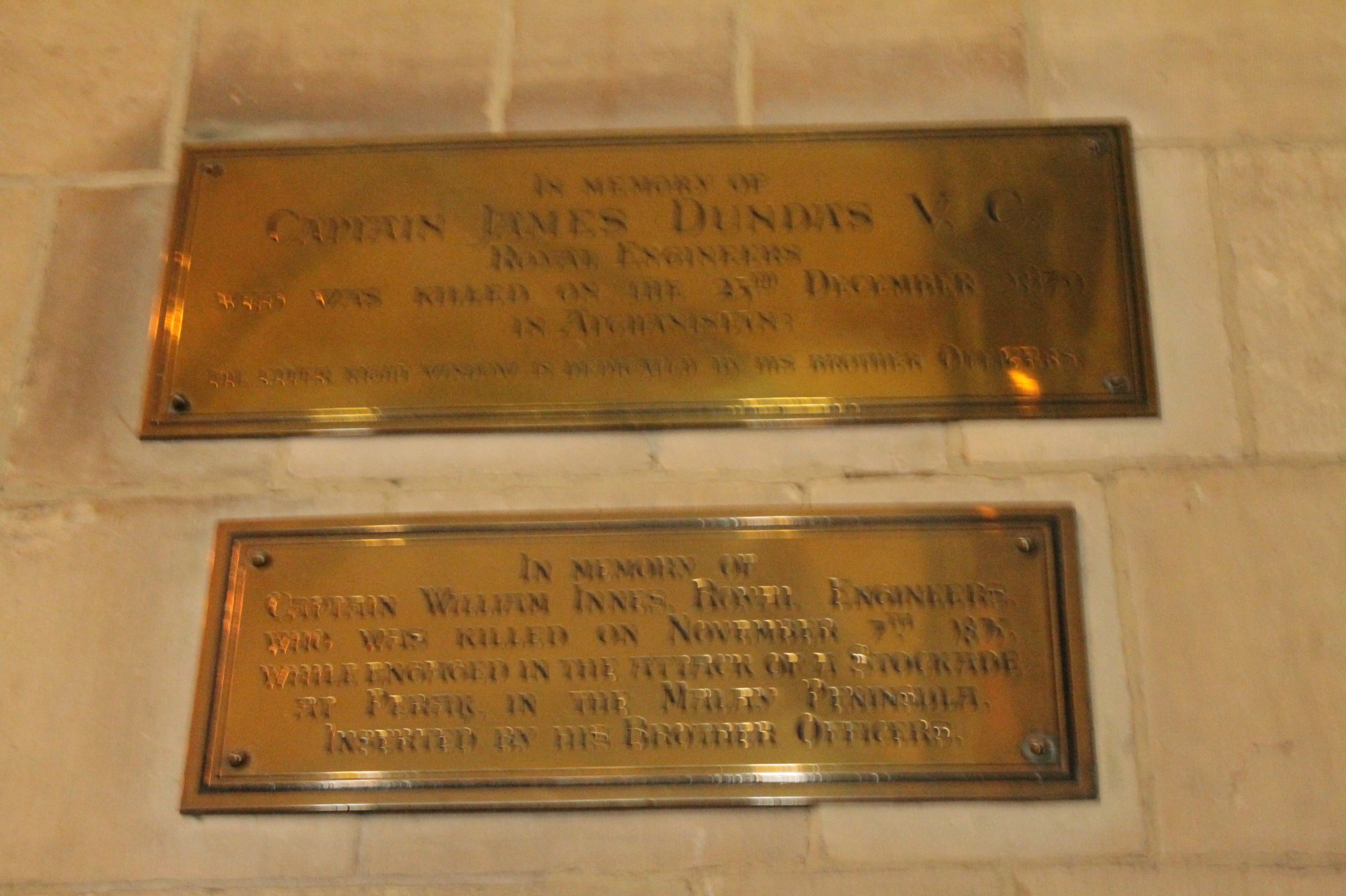
Memorial to James Dundas VC, Rochester Cathedral

James Dundas VC (10 September 1842 – 23 December 1879) was a Scottish recipient of the Victoria Cross, the highest and most prestigious award for gallantry in the face of the enemy that can be awarded to British and Commonwealth forces.

== Early life ==
He was born the son of George Dundas, Lord Manor a judge in the Edinburgh High Court, and his wife Elizabeth Mackenzie on 10 September 1842 and baptised on 12 September. He was the older brother of William John Dundas FRSE (1849–1921). His early education was at Edinburgh Academy.

From 1855 to 1857 he attended Glenalmond School. He then attended Addiscombe Military Seminary for specific officer training for the British Army. In 1860 he was given a commission as a lieutenant in the Royal Engineers.

In 1862 he went with his regiment to India under General Henry Tombs VC, and rose to the level of Executive Engineer as part of a series of public works in the Bengal area.

== Details of award ==
Dundas was 22 years old, and a lieutenant in the Bengal Engineers, Indian Army during the Bhutan War when the following deed took place on 30 April 1865 at Dewan-Giri, Bhutan for which he was awarded the VC in a joint citation with Major William Spottiswoode Trevor:

For their gallant conduct at the attack on the Block-house at Dewan-Giri, in Bhootan, on the 30th of April, 1865. Major-General Tombs, C.B., V.C., the Officer in command at the time, reports that a party of the enemy, from 180 to 200 in number, had barricaded themselves in the Block-house in question, which they continued to defend after the rest of the position had been carried, and the main body was in retreat. The Block-house, which was loop-holed, was the key of the enemy's position. Seeing no Officer of the storming party near him, and being anxious that the place should be taken immediately, as any protracted resistance might have caused the main body of the Bhooteas to rally, the British force having been fighting in a broiling sun on very steep and difficult ground for upwards of three hours, the General in command ordered these two Officers to show the way into the Block-house. They had to climb up a wall which was 14 feet high, and then to enter a house, occupied by some 200 desperate men, head foremost through an opening not more than two feet wide between the top of the wall and the roof of the Block-house. Major-General Tombs states that on speaking to the Sikh soldiers around him, and telling them in Hindoostani to swarm up the wall, none of them responded to the call, until these two Officers had shewn them the way, when they followed with the greatest alacrity. Both of them were wounded. Dundas fought on despite his wounds and convinced the 200 to surrender. He recovered from his wounds 3 months in a hospital.

The medal was presented to Dundas in Calcutta on 23 March 1868 by Major General C F Fordyce on behalf of Queen Victoria.

The medal forms part of the Ashworth Collection at the Imperial War Museum in London.

== Later life ==
In March 1877, he had inherited the family estate of Ochtertyre, near Stirling in Scotland, from his uncle Sir David Dundas MP. He returned to Britain briefly that year to inspect the property but returned to India after a few months.

In 1878 he is recorded as saving a man's life in a fire at the Simla bazaar.

Remaining in the army, Dundas died during the Second Anglo-Afghan War. General Roberts had selected him to lead a group advancing on Kabul. He was killed on 23 December 1879 during the Siege of the Sherpur Cantonment. He was killed by a British mine going off prematurely due to a makeshift fuse. He is buried nearby at the Seah Sang Cemetery in Afghanistan.

James Dundas died unmarried, and on his death the estate passed to his twin brother Colin Mackenzie Dundas.

== Memorials ==
A brass memorial plaque exists in St Mary's Cathedral, Edinburgh (Episcopal).

A plaque also exists at Glenalmond School.

Listed on the "For Valour" memorial at the Royal Engineers Museum in Kent.

A memorial window and brass plaque in Rochester Cathedral.

In 2002 the Royal Engineers erected a new bridge in Afghanistan close to where he met his fate and named it the James Dundas Bridge.

== Further information ==
"The Dundas Bridge", between Kabul and Bagram, Afghanistan, was named after him, by the British Army, Royal Engineers, following reconstruction work during 2002.
