= Ron Dundas =

Canadian football player

Profile
- Position: End

Personal information
- Born: c. 1935
- Died: November 9, 1986 (aged 51); Ellensburg, Washington, U.S.
- Listed height: 6 ft 5 in (1.96 m)
- Listed weight: 232 lb (105 kg)

Career history
- 1956–1960: Saskatchewan Roughriders
- 1961: Edmonton Eskimos

Ronald Edward Dundas (b. c. 1935 - d. November 9, 1986) was a Canadian football player who played for the Saskatchewan Roughriders and Edmonton Eskimos, mainly in the Tight end position. He played junior football in Regina. His son, Rocky Dundas, also had a career in the NHL with the Toronto Maple Leafs.
