= Charles Dundas =

Charles Dundas may refer to:

- Charles Dundas, 1st Baron Amesbury (1751–1832), British member of parliament (MP)
- Charles Dundas (MP, born 1771) (1771–1810), MP for Malton, and for Richmond
- Charles Whitley Deans Dundas (1811–1856), MP for Flint 1837–1841
- Charles Saunders Dundas, 6th Viscount Melville (1843–1926), Viscount Melville
- Charles Dundas (naval officer) (1859–1924), Royal Navy rear-admiral, grandfather of Charles Jauncey, Baron Jauncey of Tullichettle
- Charles Dundas (colonial administrator) (1884–1956), British colonial governor
- Charles Dundas (priest) (1847–1932), Anglican priest
