= Thomas Dundas =

Thomas Dundas may refer to:

- Thomas Dundas (of Fingask and Carronhall) (died 1786), MP for Orkney and Shetland
- Thomas Dundas, 1st Baron Dundas (1741–1820), British politician
- Thomas Dundas (British Army officer) (1750–1794), governor of Guadaloupe
- Thomas Dundas (Royal Navy officer) (c. 1765–1841), British naval officer of the Napoleonic Wars
- Thomas Dundas, 2nd Earl of Zetland (1795–1873), British nobleman and politician
- Thomas Dundas (High Sheriff) of Sussex
