= Robert Dundas =

Robert Dundas may refer to:

- Robert Dundas, Lord Arniston (1650–1726), Scottish judge and politician
- Robert Dundas of Arniston, the Elder (1685–1753), his son, Scottish judge
- Robert Dundas of Arniston, the younger (1713–1787), Scottish judge
- Robert Dundas of Arniston (1758–1819), Scottish judge
- Sir Robert Dundas, 1st Baronet (1761–1835), Scottish landowner and lawyer
- Robert Dundas, 2nd Viscount Melville (1771–1851), Scottish nobleman
- Robert Dundas, 4th Viscount Melville, Scottish nobleman
- Robert Nisbet-Hamilton (1804–1877), known as Robert Dundas until 1835, British Conservative Party politician
- Sir Robert Dundas (British Army officer, born 1780) (1780–1844), British Army officer and politician
- Robert Dundas, 9th Viscount Melville (1937–2011), British Army officer
- RFA Robert Dundas, a ship of the Royal Fleet Auxiliary
