= John Dundas =

John Dundas may refer to:

- John Dundas (1808–1866), 1st Earl of Zetland, Lord Lieutenant of Orkney and Shetland, MP for Richmond and York
- John Dundas (1845–1892), Lord Lieutenant of Orkney and Shetland, MP for Richmond
- John Dundas (RAF officer) (1915–1940), World War II fighter ace
