= Henry Dundas (1786 EIC ship) =

History

United Kingdom
- Name: Henry Dundas
- Namesake: Henry Dundas, 1st Viscount Melville
- Owner: Voyages:1-4 Donald Cameron; Voyages 5-6:Thomas Newte
- Builder: Perry, Blackwall
- Launched: November 1786: Launched by Perry, Blackwall
- Fate: Broken up 1804

General characteristics
- Tons burthen: 799, or 802, or 80277/94 (bm)
- Length: 143 ft 9 in (43.8 m) (overall), 116 ft 5 1/2 in (35.5 m) (keel)
- Beam: 34 ft 0 in (10.4 m)
- Depth of hold: 14 ft 9 in (4.5 m)
- Sail plan: Full-rigged ship
- Complement: 1793: 99; 1795:100; 1797:100
- Armament: 1793: 26 × 9&4-pounder guns + 6 swivel guns; 1795:26 × 9&4-pounder guns + 6 swivel guns; 1797:26 × 9&4-pounder guns + 6 swivel guns
- Notes: Three decks

Henry Dundas was an East Indiaman launched in 1786 that made six voyages for the British East India Company (EIC). She was broken up in 1804.

== Career ==
=== EIC voyage #1 (1787-1788) ===
Captain Angus McNab sailed from Portsmouth on 21 February 1787, bound for Madras and Bengal. Henry Dundas reached Madras on 12 June, and arrived at Diamond Creek on 23 June. She left Culpee on 19 December, reached St Helena on 16 May 1788, and arrived at the Downs on 10 July.

=== EIC voyage #2 (1790-1791) ===
Captain McNab left the Downs on 31 March 1790, bound for Bombay and China. Henry Dundas arrived at Bombay on 31 July. She was at Tellicherry on 2 October, and Batavia on 30 October, before she arrived at Whampoa Anchorage on 20 January 1791. Homeward bound, she crossed the Second Bar on 7 March, reached St Helena on 7 July, and arrived at the Downs on 5 September.

=== EIC voyage #3 (1793-1794) ===
As war with France had broken out, Captain McNab acquired a letter of marque on 8 May 1793. Captain Walter Carruthers replaced McNab and he acquired a new letter of marque on 30 May.

Captain Carruthers sailed from Portsmouth on 7 July 1793, bound for China. Henry Dundas reached Batavia on 27 October and arrived at Whampoa on 4 January 1794. Homeward bound, she crossed the Second Bar on 28 February, reached St Helena on 18 June, and arrived at the Downs on 7 September.

=== EIC voyage #4 (1795-1797) ===
In March 1795 insurance was taken out on three Indiamen - Rodney, Oxford and Henry Dundas - in each instance for £8,000. Of this sum £6,000 was for the vessel, £1,000 for 'Stores, Tackle and Furniture' and £1,000 for sails.

Captain John Campbell acquired a letter of marque on 29 May 1795. He sailed from Portsmouth on 9 July 1795, bound for Madras and Bengal. Henry Dundas was at Rio de Janeiro on 6 September, reached Madras on 16 December, and Karakaul 23 December, before returning to Madras on 14 January 1796. She arrived at Madras - 24 Feb Kedgeree on 24 February. Homeward bound, she was at Madras on 4 July, the Cape of Good Hope on 3 November, and St Helena on 5 December. She arrived at the Downs on 8 February 1797.

=== EIC voyage #5 (1797-1799) ===
Captain Walter Carruthers acquired a letter of marque on 21 June 1797. He sailed from Torbay on 22 September, bound for Madras and Bengal. Henry Dundas reached Madras on 3 February 1798, and Kedgeree on 10 March. She was at Saugor on 28 April and Madras again on 28 May. She returned to Diamond Harbour on 11 July. Homeward bound, she was at Saugor on 22 August, Madras on 22 September, the Cape on 3 January 1799, and St Helena on 9 February. She arrived at the Downs on 13 July.

=== EIC voyage #6 (1801-1802) ===
Captain Carruthers sailed from Portsmouth on 23 April 1801, bound for Bengal. Henry Dundas reached Madeira on 9 May. There two crewmen stole the ship's cutter, for which they were punished.

She made an unplanned stop at St Augustine's Bay on 5 August. Many of the crew and passengers were sick and Henry Dundas needed to replenish her water and provisions.

On 10 September she reached Colombo, leaving on 2 October. On 22 October she arrived at Kedgeree. Homeward bound, she was at Saugor on 15 February 1802, reached St Helena on 31 May, and arrived the Downs on 27 July.

== Fate ==
By 1802 and after six voyages Henry Dundas was worn out. She was broken up and her registration was cancelled on 9 April 1804.
