= Lawrence Dundas =

Lawrence Dundas may refer to:

- Sir Lawrence Dundas, 1st Baronet (1710–1781)
- Lawrence Dundas, 1st Earl of Zetland (1766–1839), British politician and nobleman
- Lawrence Dundas, 1st Marquess of Zetland (1844–1929), British politician and statesman
- Lawrence Dundas, 2nd Marquess of Zetland (1876–1961), British politician, also known as Lord Dundas and Earl of Ronaldshay
- Lawrence Dundas, 3rd Marquess of Zetland (1908–1989), lawn tennis player known before 1971 as the Earl of Ronaldshay
- Lawrence Mark Dundas, 4th Marquess of Zetland (born 1937), British nobleman
