= David Dundas, Lord Dundas =

Scottish politician and judge

David Dundas
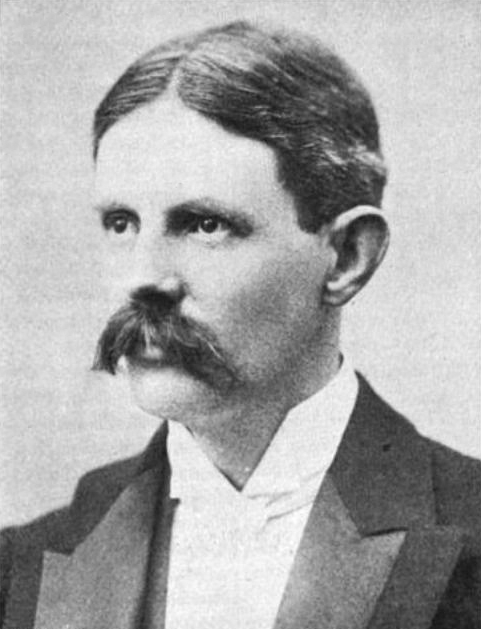
- Born: 8 June 1854
- Died: 14 February 1922 (aged 67); Edinburgh, Scotland
- Burial place: Warriston Cemetery
- Education: Edinburgh Academy; Balliol College, Oxford; University of Edinburgh
- Occupations: Politician, judge
- Political party: Conservative
- Parents: George Dundas (father); Elizabeth Mackenzie (mother)

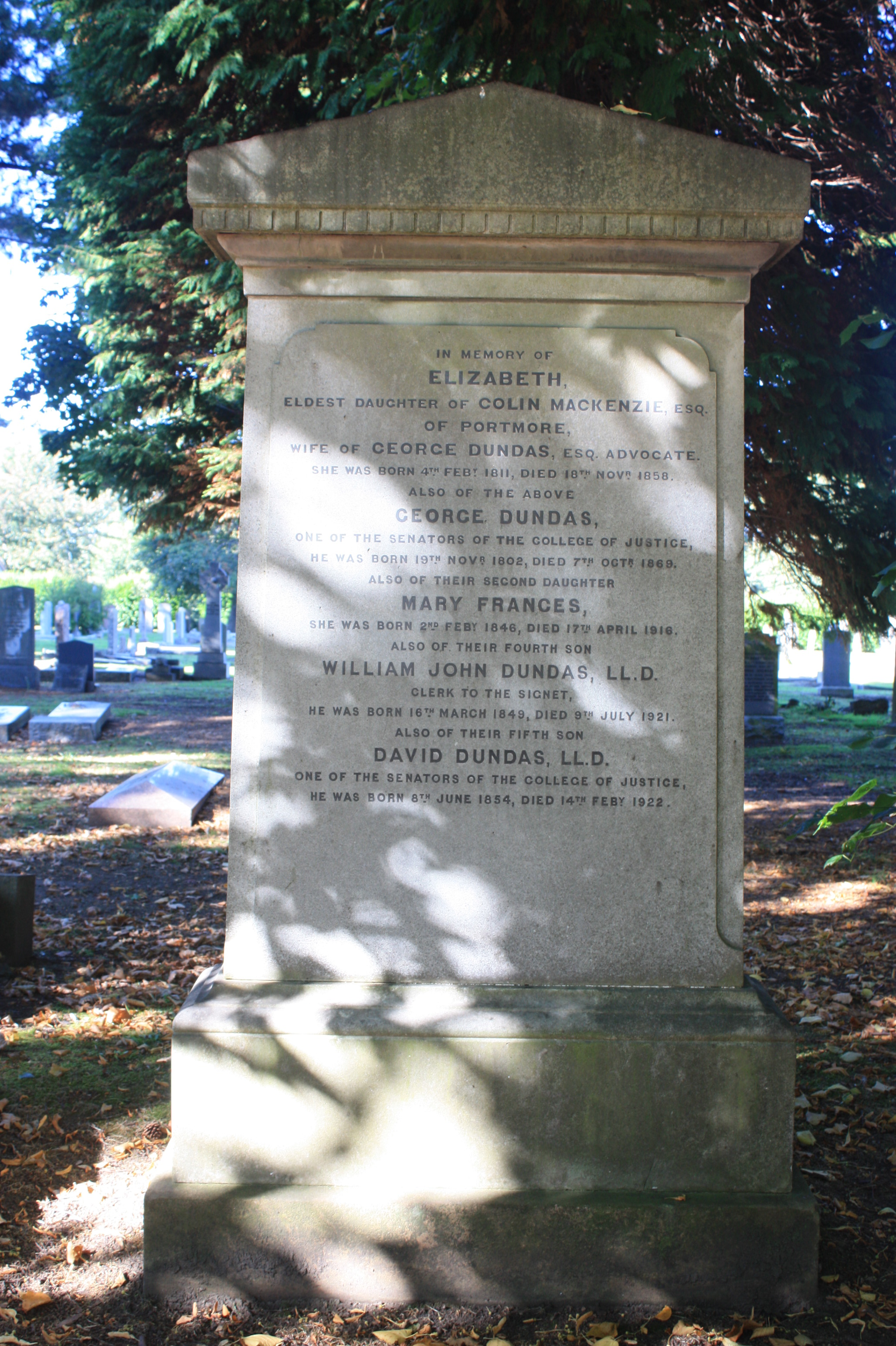
The grave of David Dundas, Lord Dundas, Warriston Cemetery, Edinburgh

David Dundas, Lord Dundas (8 June 1854 – 14 February 1922) was a Scottish politician and judge.

== Life ==
David Dundas was born on 8 June 1854. The youngest son of George Dundas (1802–1869), one of the Senators of the College of Justice in Scotland, and of late Elizabeth Mackenzie, he was educated at Edinburgh Academy, Balliol College, Oxford and the University of Edinburgh.

He was admitted to the Scottish Bar in 1878, and was an Advocate Depute from 1890 to 1892, Interim Sheriff of Argyllshire from 1896 to 1898. He was appointed a Queen's Counsel in 1897.

Unsuccessful Conservative parliamentary candidate for Linlithgowshire at the 1900 General Election, he held office as Solicitor General for Scotland in the Conservative government from 1903 until 1905, when he was appointed a Senator of the College of Justice (following in his father's footsteps) with the judicial title Lord Dundas.

He died at his home in Edinburgh on 14 February 1922. He is buried with his parents and siblings (including William John Dundas) in Warriston Cemetery in Edinburgh. The grave stands at the north side of the main upper east–west path, towards its western end.

Legal offices
Preceded by Charles Scott Dickson	Solicitor General for Scotland; 1903–1905	Succeeded by Edward Theodore Salvesen
