= Dundas & Wilson =

British law firm

Dundas & Wilson LLP
- Headquarters: Edinburgh, United Kingdom
- No. of offices: 3
- No. of lawyers: 400+
- Major practice areas: Commercial Law
- Revenue: ▲£62 million (FY 2011)
- Date founded: 1759
- Company type: Limited liability partnership
- Website: www.dundas-wilson.com

Dundas & Wilson LLP was a commercial UK law firm with offices in Edinburgh, Glasgow, London and Aberdeen.

In May 2014 Dundas and Wilson merged with CMS Cameron McKenna.

In 2012 the firm was ranked in the Top 30 Firms in Europe for Innovation by the Financial Times.

== Expertise ==
The independent legal directory Legal 500 ranked Dundas & Wilson as a Tier 1 firm in 2012 in the following areas:

- Banking & Finance
- Construction
- Corporate & Commercial
- Commercial Litigation
- Commercial Property (Scotland)
- Education
- Employment
- Energy (Excluding Oil & Gas)
- Insolvency & Corporate Recovery
- Intellectual Property
- IT & Telecoms
- Local Government
- Pensions
- Planning
- Professional Negligence
- Projects
- Transport
- Unit Trusts, OEICs and investment trusts

== History ==
Dundas & Wilson traces its roots to 1759 when David Erskine founded his own legal practice in Edinburgh. Sir James Dundas of Ochtertyre Clerk to the Signet subsequently joined the practice and, after the death of David Erskine, William Wilson joined the partnership to form Dundas & Wilson. From at least 1841 the firm had offices at 16 Charlotte Square, Edinburgh. The firm remained at the Square until 1991.

The firm was active in Scotland during the 19th century as can be seen from the numerous references to the firm in Court of Session reports or old Sasine titles.

Dundas & Wilson became a limited liability partnership in 2004.

In May 2014 Dundas and Wilson combined with CMS.
