= Sydney Prior Hall =

British painter (1842–1922)

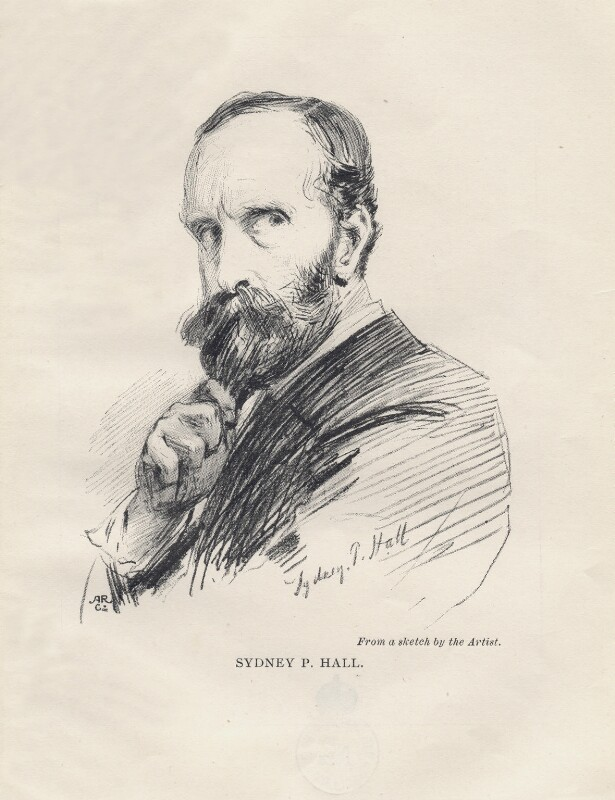
- Sydney Prior Hall, self-portrait, 1895
- Born: 18 October 1842; Newmarket, Suffolk
- Died: 15 December 1922 (aged 80); St John's Wood, London
- Known for: Illustrator, Portrait painter, Children's Literature
- Spouses: Emma Holland (m. 1877) Mary Gow (m. 1907)
- Children: Henry R. H. Hall

Sydney Prior Hall MVO, MA (18 October 1842 – 15 December 1922) was a British portrait painter and illustrator and one of the leading reportage artists of the later Victorian period.

The son of animal portraitist Harry Hall, Sydney Hall was educated at Merchant Taylors' School. He decided on a career as an artist while at Oxford University and joined the staff of The Graphic, an illustrated newspaper, shortly after its foundation in late 1869. He immediately established his name with a series of vivid drawings made at the front during the Franco-Prussian War.

As stated in the contemporary publication The Art Journal, his drawings of the Parnell Commission were among his finest achievements in the medium of graphic journalism: "he was in court the whole time, busy with a swift revealing pencil which missed no turn of affairs."

He illustrated a number of books including Tom Brown's School Days (MacMillan, 1885), and Tom Brown at Oxford by Thomas Hughes.

Hall married Emma Holland (1846/7–1894), in 1877; the couple had already produced a son, Henry R. H. Hall (1873–1930), who became assistant keeper of Egyptian and Assyrian antiquities at the British Museum. Following the death of his first wife, Hall married the painter Mary Gow (1851–1929), in 1907. Hall died at his home in London on 15 December 1922.

== Gallery ==
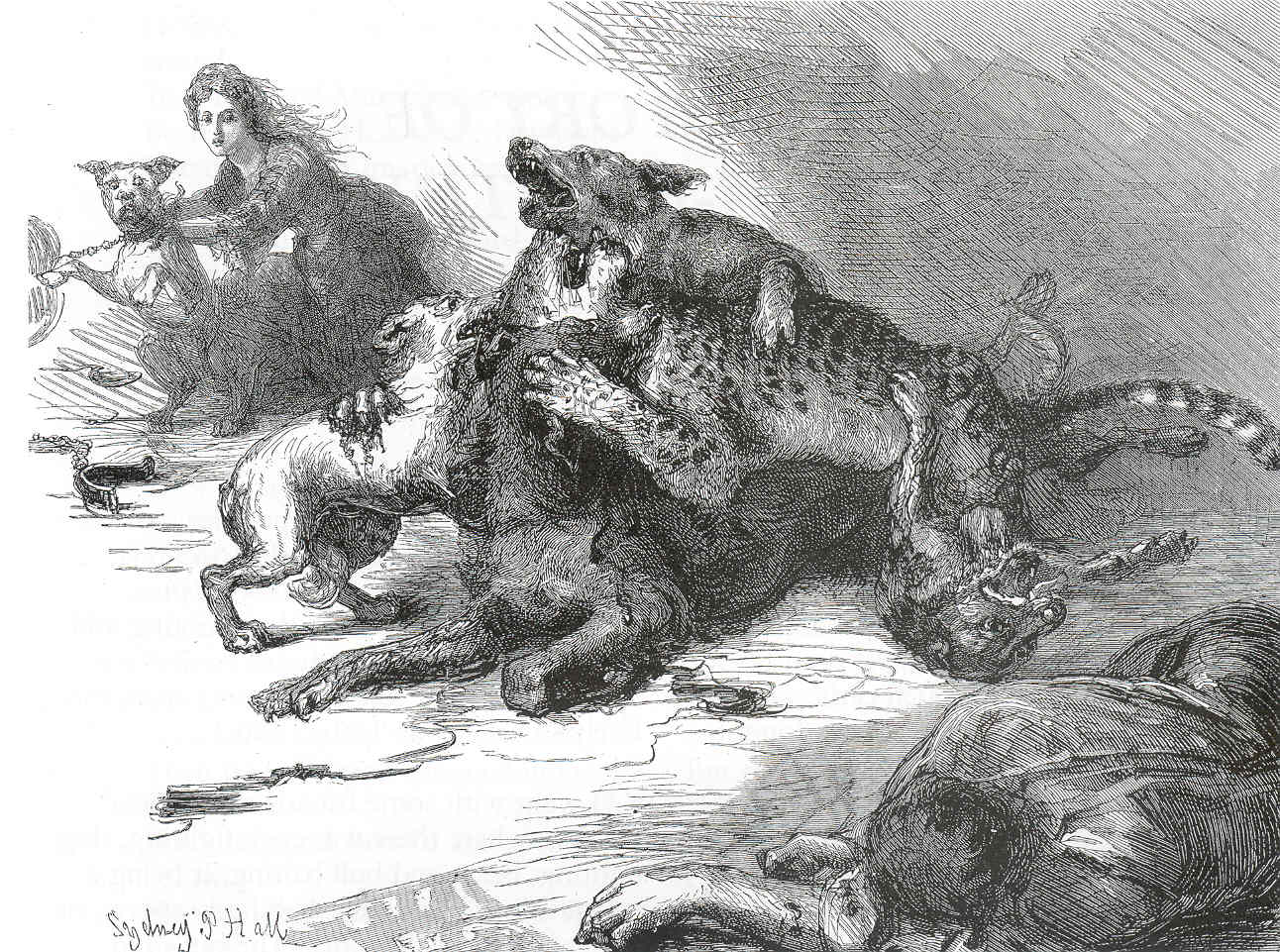
Escaped Leopard Battles with Dogs at Raglan Castle, circa 1875, by Sydney P. Hall

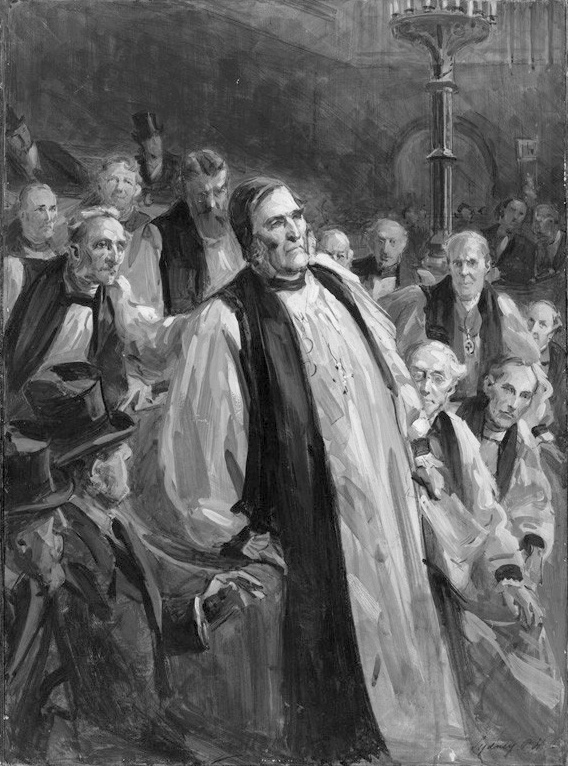
Painting depicting Archbishop of Canterbury Frederick Temple's collapse in the House of Lords while delivering a speech on the Education Bill, on 2 December 1902.

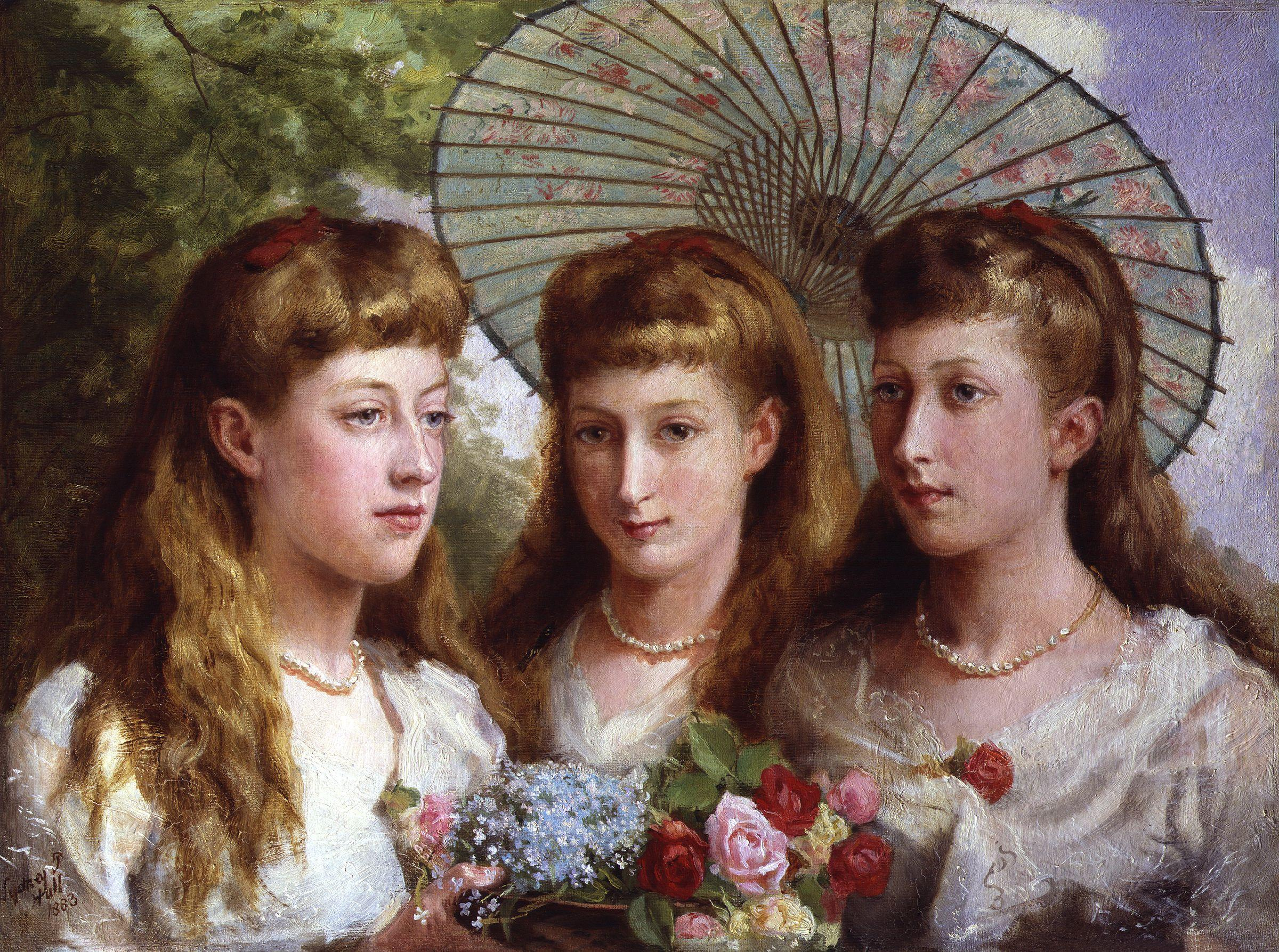
The three daughters of King Edward VII and Queen Alexandra, 1883

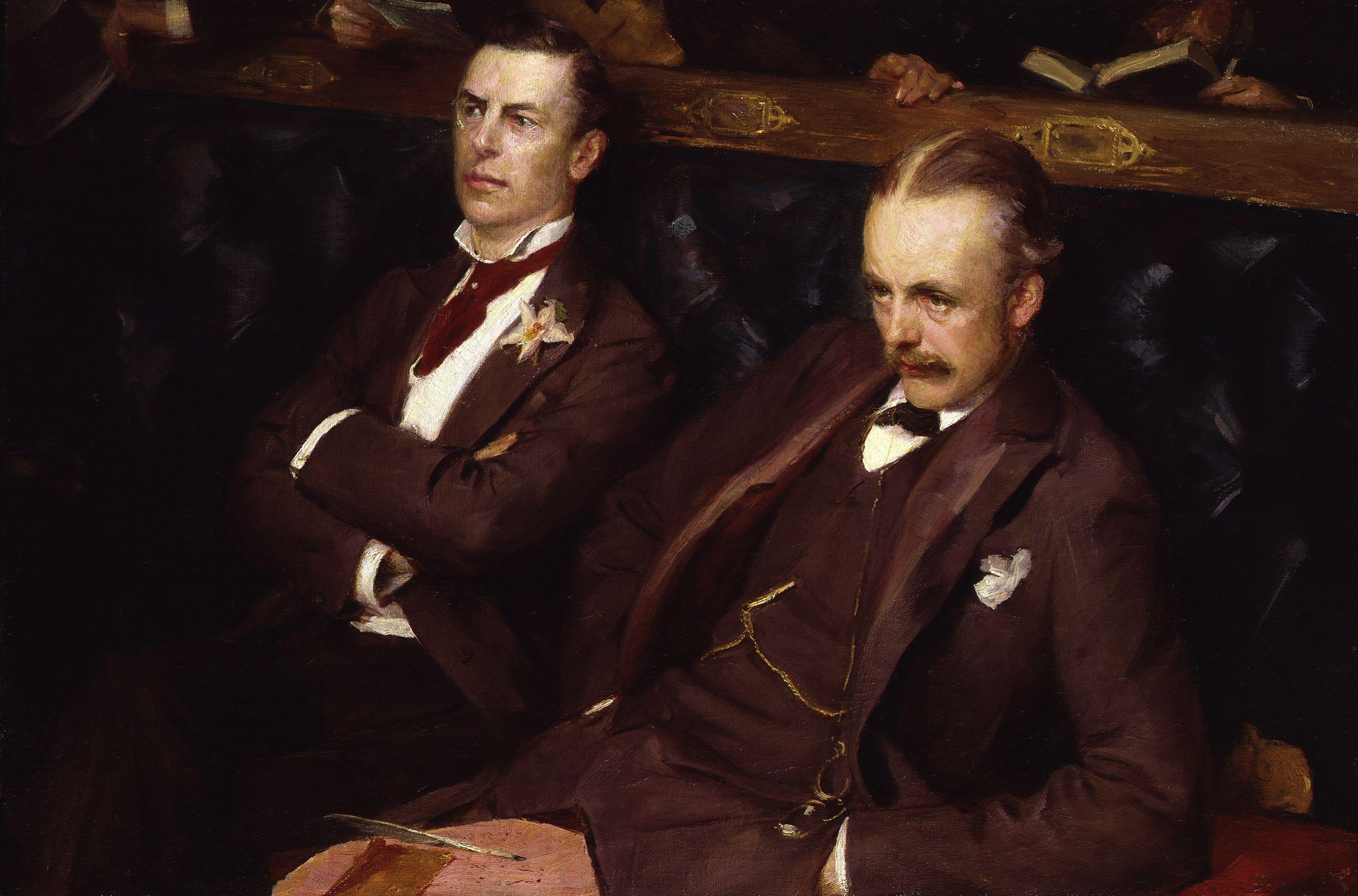
Joseph Chamberlain and Arthur Balfour, 1895

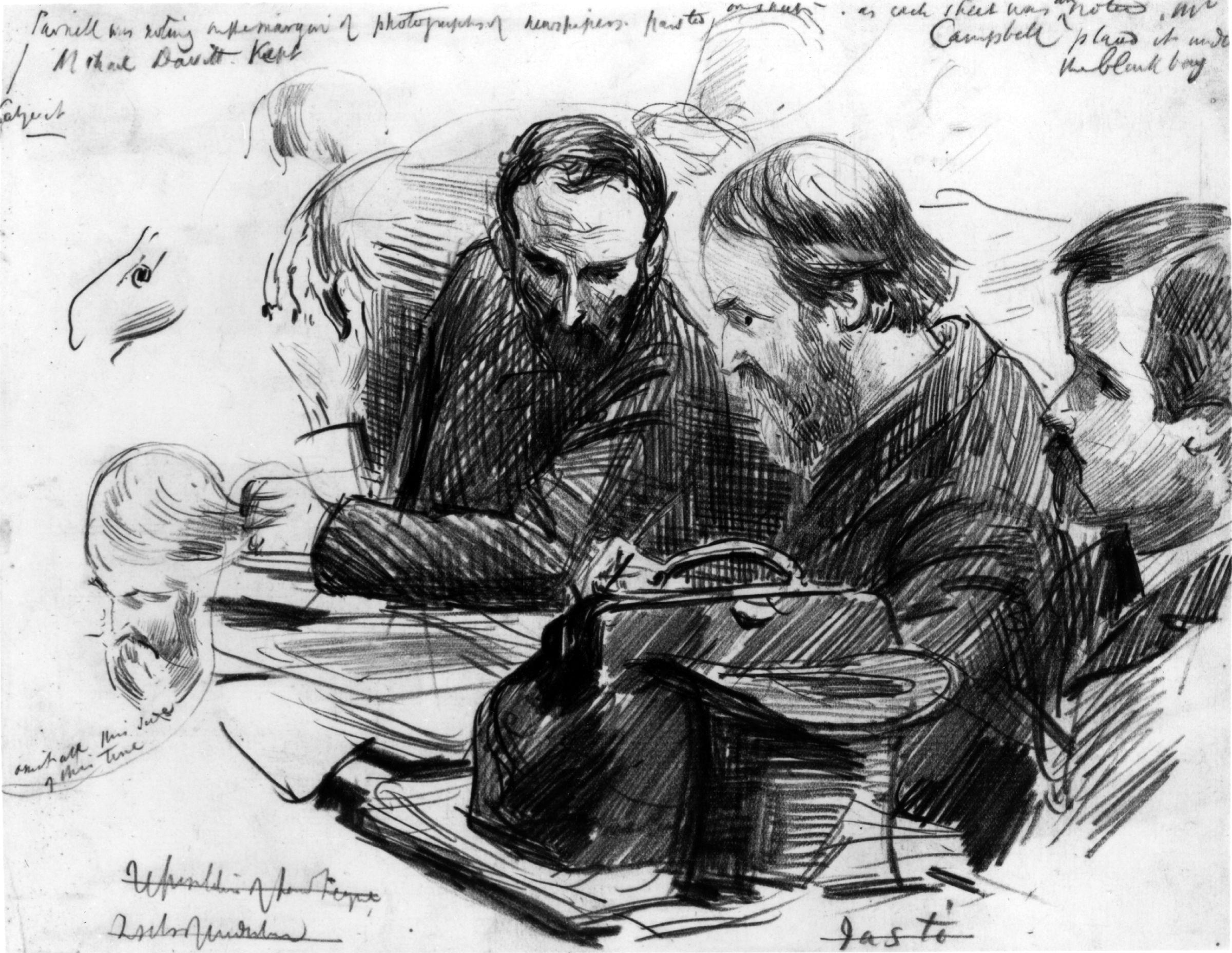
A sketch from the Parnell Commission, 1889

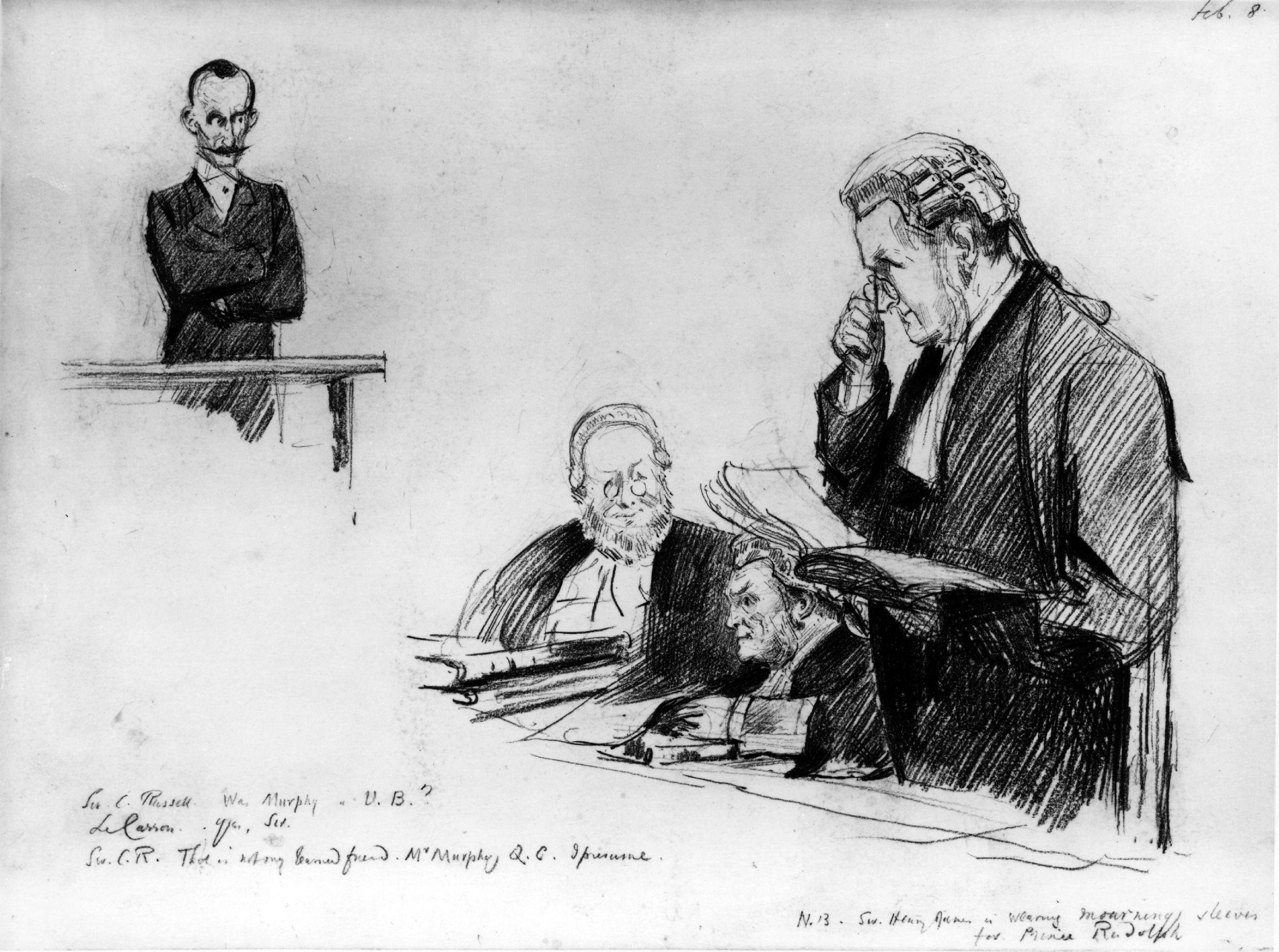
A sketch from the Parnell Commission, 1889
