= Duke of Gordon's Monument =

Commemorative Monument in Moray, Scotland

The Duke of Gordon's Monument
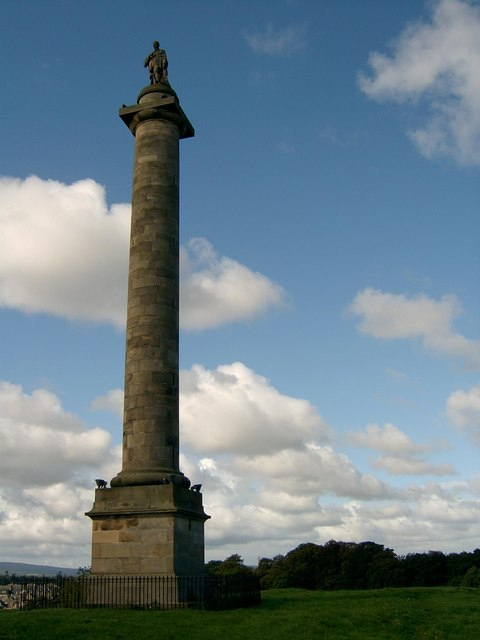
- The Duke of Gordon's Monument
- Location: Lady Hill, near Elgin
- Coordinates: 57°38′53″N 03°19′20″W
- Designer: William Burn
- Type: Tuscan column
- Height: 80 ft, excluding the statue
- Beginning date: 1838 (column built)
- Completion date: 1855 (statue added)

The Duke of Gordon's Monument is a commemorative monument on Lady Hill in Elgin, Scotland. Built in honour of George Gordon, the 5th Duke of Gordon, the monument takes the form of a Tuscan column, 80 feet (24 m) high, and 6 feet 9 inches (2.06 m) wide at the base. The column is hollow, with a spiral staircase leading up the shaft which gives access to the top. It was erected in 1839, and a statue of Gordon, sculpted by Thomas Goodwillie, was installed on the top in 1855. It is designated as a Category A listed building.

The monument was designed by the architect William Burn of Edinburgh, who designed various other monuments including the Melville Monument in St Andrews Square. It was built at a cost of £1,240 by masons Brander and Shand, and paid for from funds established by a bequest and contributed to by the Morayshire Farmers Club. Originally it was topped with a lantern, but that did not meet with critical approval and it was replaced by Goodwillie's statue, depicting Gordon wearing the robes of office associated with his role as Chancellor of Marischall College, Aberdeen, in 1855.
