= Balintore =

Balintore (Gaelic: Baile a Todhair) can refer to several places in Scotland:

- Balintore, Easter Ross, a village in Easter Ross
  - Balintore F.C., an association football club in Balintore, Easter Ross
- Balintore, Angus, a village in Angus
- Balintore Castle, a castle in Angus
