= Occupy Edinburgh =

2011 demonstration in Edinburgh, Scotland

- Part of the Occupy Movement
- Date: 15 October 2011
- Location: Edinburgh, Scotland; 55°57′15.12″N 3°11′34.8″W
- Caused by: 2008 financial crisis, United Kingdom government austerity programme, Economic inequality, corporate influence over government, inter alia.
- Methods: Demonstrations, street protesters
- Occupation of St. Andrew Square lasted 108 days.

Occupy Edinburgh was a protest against economic and social inequality as part of the global Occupy movement.

The "occupation" began with the erection of a number of tents in St. Andrew Square on 14 October 2011. The site was chosen because St. Andrew Square is the historic centre of the Edinburgh's financial sector and location of the head branch of the Royal Bank of Scotland, which was partly nationalised in 2008 following its role in the 2008 financial crisis.

Journalist Peter Geoghegan visited St. Andrew Square on the second day of its occupation and described the participants:

A large number of the 200-odd people on St Andrew's Square were old stagers from the trade union movement or leftist political parties, but just as many were unaffiliated, concerned citizens angry at an economic system that seems to benefit the status quo and a party political structure is aloof, unresponsive and in hock to big business.

On the night of 24 November 2011, Edinburgh City Council became the first governmental body in the world to grant both the Occupy Edinburgh and the worldwide Occupy Movement official recognition.

On 24 December Occupy Edinburgh activists raised a pirate flag above the nearby RBS Head Branch, claiming it was "it was the work of santa".

The group was urged to leave the site by Essential Edinburgh, the business group that manages St. Andrew Square, and the Edinburgh Chamber of Commerce. The Chamber's deputy chief executive, Graham Birse, said: "We did not spend all that public money for St Andrew Square to become a campsite for those with nowhere else to go." On 30 January the group relocated to The Meadows, a park within Edinburgh, before leaving this site a couple of weeks later ahead of a legal bid to have them evicted by the City Council.

The occupation of St. Andrew Square lasted 108 days.

== See also ==
- 15 October 2011 global protests
- List of global Occupy movement protest locations
- "Occupy" protests
- Timeline of Occupy Wall Street
- We are the 99%
- Occupy Glasgow, another occupy camp in Scotland
- Climate Camp UK, another protest which targeted RBS in Edinburgh, August 2010
