= Essential Edinburgh =

Essential Edinburgh manage the Edinburgh New Town city centre Business Improvement District (BID). The area covered stretches from Charlotte Square to the new St. James Centre. Their offices are at 139 George Street.

Essential Edinburgh was formed on 1 July 2008, and their contract was renewed on 24 May 2018 for five more years based on a business plan for 2018–2023. They are funded by a levy on businesses within the Business Improvement District, which initially they had difficulty in collecting.

In October 2018, they launched a campaign to promote shopping on and around Princes Street and George Street. Events held in George Street have been controversial because of disruptions to do with noise, litter and access. An 80-metre drop tower was cancelled because of complaints from businesses.

== St Andrew Square ==
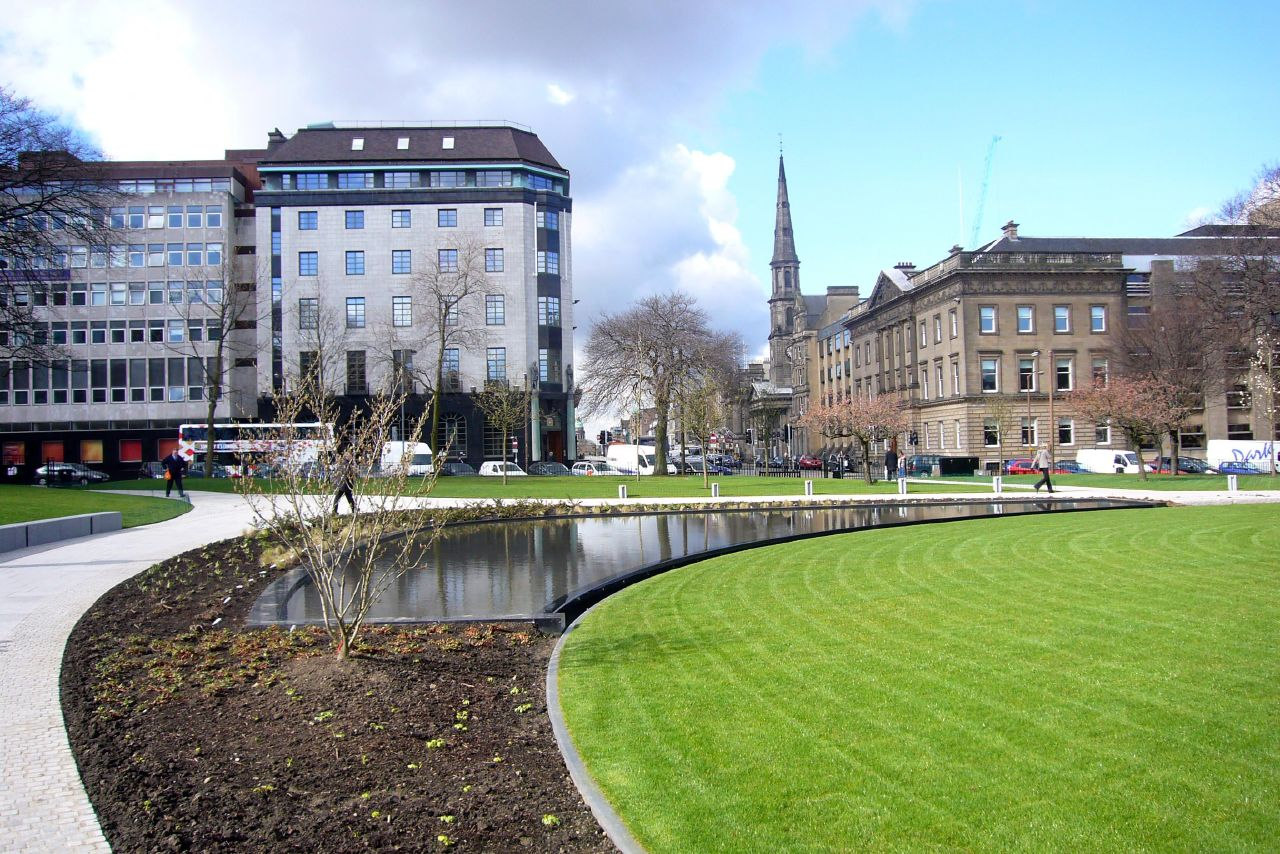
St Andrew Square in 2008

Essential Edinburgh manage St Andrew Square, which was opened to the public on 4 April 2008 after refurbishment funded by the City of Edinburgh Council and Scottish Enterprise. New paths were built and a shallow, reflective pool.

In 2012, they opposed Occupy Edinburgh taking over St Andrew Square.

In August 2020, Essential Edinburgh applied for planning to erect a plaque on the Melville Monument. Descendants of Henry Dundas have said this is "biased", "defamatory", and "historically inaccurate".

== Board of directors ==
The Board of Directors includes representatives of the Boots UK, Creative Cookware, Charlie Miller Hairdressing, Edinburgh Woollen Mill, John Lewis Partnership, Harvey Nichols, Marks & Spencers, Montpeliers (Edinburgh) Ltd, Royal Bank of Scotland, Signaute Pubs, and Standard Life Investments.

== See also ==
- Business improvement district
