= Occupy Glasgow =

Protest group against economic inequality

- Part of the Occupy protests
- Occupy Glasgow
- Date: From 15 October 2011
- Location: Glasgow, Scotland, United Kingdom
- Caused by: Economic inequality, corporate influence over government, inter alia.

Occupy Glasgow was a protest in Glasgow, Scotland, and an offshoot of the Occupy movement. The protest started on 15 October 2011 opposite the City Chambers in George Square, but due to possible conflict with Remembrance Day events, Glasgow City Council granted an eviction warrant, in force from 7 November, and protesting was moved to Kelvingrove Park in agreement with the council.

== History ==
=== Rape incident at George Square camp ===
A woman was raped in a tent at Glasgow's George Square, on 26 October 2011, which is the site of an anti-capitalist protest camp. The 28-year-old is understood to have been attacked in the tent in the early hours of Wednesday morning, approximately 12.45am. Police have said they are looking for two suspects they believe are known to the victim.

=== Council orders camp to disband ===
Glasgow City Council declared the camp was illegal under park management rules and ordered the group to leave "with immediate effect". A "letter of expulsion" was sent on 15 October to activists who had set up tents there. The council said the timing of the letter being issued was not connected to the rape.

=== Kelvingrove Park ===
On Thursday 3 November, Glasgow City Council gave over a section of Kelvingrove Park to be a protest camp, setting up amenities, fresh water, flood lights and fencing to facilitate the protest. Protesters also set up a satellite camp in the privately owned park in Blythswood Square.

== See also ==
- Occupy Edinburgh, another occupy camp in Scotland
- List of Occupy movement protest locations
