= William Burn =

Scottish architect (1789-1870)

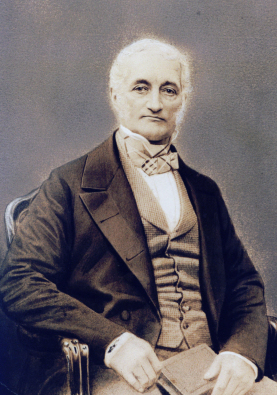
- William Burn
- Born: 20 December 1789; Edinburgh, Scotland
- Died: 15 February 1870 (aged 80); London, England
- Occupation: Architect
- Known for: country houses

William Burn FRSE (20 December 1789 – 15 February 1870) was a Scottish architect. He received major commissions from the age of 20 until his death at 81. He built in many styles and was a pioneer of the Scottish Baronial Revival, often referred to as the golden age of Scottish architecture.

== Life ==
Burn was born in Rose Street in Edinburgh, the son of architect Robert Burn and his wife Janet Patterson. He was the fourth of their sixteen children.

He was educated at the High School in Edinburgh's Old Town. He started training with Sir Robert Smirke in London in 1808. This is where he worked on Lowther Castle with C.R. Cockerell, Henry Roberts and Lewis Vulliamy.

After training with Smirke, Burn returned to Edinburgh in 1812. There, he established a practice from the family builders' yard. His first independent commission was in Renfrewshire. In 1812, he designed the exchange assembly rooms in Greenock. His father gave him the commission for North Leith Parish Church; this commission is what made his career and gave him a reputation.

In 1816, Burn entered a competition to complete Robert Adam's Old College. He lost the competition to William Henry Playfair. Thenceforth, Burn started designing country houses.

In 1827, he was elected a Fellow of the Royal Society of Edinburgh, unusual for an architect, his proposer being James Skene.

In 1825, he took on a pupil, David Bryce. In 1841, they went into partnership together. Bryce ran the Scottish office, and Burn ran the English office, in Stratton Street. From 1844, he worked in London, where he took on his nephew John Macvicar Anderson as a partner.

In the 1830s, he was living and working at 131 George Street in the New Town.

By 1850, the Scottish office was much more profitable, and the partnership ended.

Burn was a master of many styles. He was a pioneer of the Scottish Baronial Revival, with Helen's Tower (1848), Castlewellan Castle (1856) and Balintore Castle (1859).

== Freemasonry ==
It has not been ascertained where Burn became a Freemason but he was the Grand Architect of the Grand Lodge of Scotland from 1827 to 1844 when his pupil, David Bryce, was named as 'joint' Grand Architect. Both served the Grand Lodge of Antient Free and Accepted Masons of Scotland, in that joint capacity, until 1849. Thereafter, David Bryce was Grand Architect in his own right until 1876.

== Death ==
Burn died in 1870, aged 80, at 6 Stratton Street in Piccadilly, London, and is buried in Kensal Green Cemetery just on the edge of the path to the north-west of the Anglican Chapel.

== Trained under Burn ==
William Burn had many pupils:

- John Honeyman
- David Bryce
- John Lessels
- George Meikle Kemp
- Thomas Brown
- James Campbell Walker
- William Eden Nesfield
- David MacGibbon

== Works ==
Burn was a prolific architect and happy to turn his hand to a variety of styles. He designed churches, castles, public buildings, country houses (as many as 600), monuments and other structures, mainly in Scotland, but also in England and Ireland. His works include among others:

=== Scotland ===
- Ardanaiseig House, near Kilchrenan, Argyll
- Tealing House, Tealing, remodelled (1827)
- Auchterarder House (1831)
- Balintore Castle, Angus (1859) Scottish Baronial
- The Binns, remodelled for the Dalyell family (1811) Gothic
- Blairquhan Castle, South Ayrshire (1821) Gothic
- Blantyre Monument, Erskine (1825)
- Buchanan Castle
- Camperdown House, Dundee (1820) Greek Revival
- Castle Menzies (1840) new wing
- Carstairs House, South Lanarkshire (1820–1823) Gothic
- Corstorphine Old Parish Church (1828) – considered too radical and returned to its medieval orientation in 1905
- Dornoch Cathedral major reconstruction (1835–1837)
- The Duke of Gordon's Monument, Elgin, Moray (1839)
- Dundas Castle, near Edinburgh (1818) Gothic
- Dunira, Perthshire (1852) demolished
- Dupplin Castle (1828) demolished
- The Edinburgh Academy (1824)
- Gallanach House, near Oban, Argyll (1814)
- Garscube House, Dunbartonshire (1827)
- House of Falkland, Falkland, Fife (1839–1844)
- Inverness Castle, Inverness (1836) Gothic
- John Watson's Institution now the Scottish National Gallery of Modern Art, Edinburgh (1825) Neoclassic
- Keir Parish Church, Keirmill Village, Dumfriesshire (1813)
- Lauriston Castle, Edinburgh, Scotland, (west range only) (1827) Jacobean
- Lude House, Blair Atholl, Perth and Kinross (1837)
- Murray Royal Lunatic Asylum, Perth (1827)
- North Leith Parish Church, Madeira Street, Leith (1814) Neoclassical
- Church of St John the Evangelist, Edinburgh (1818) Gothic
- The Melville Monument in the centre of St Andrew Square, Edinburgh (1820–3) (topped by a statue by Robert Forrest)
- New Abbey Church, Dunfermline, Fife (1821)
- Madras College, St Andrews (1832) Jacobean

=== England ===
- Adderstone Hall, near Lucker, Northumberland (1819) Georgian Grecian
- Cliveden, Buckinghamshire
- Harlaxton Manor, Grantham, Lincolnshire
- Lyne-Stephens Mausoleum, Roehampton (1862–1864)
- Lynford Hall, Norfolk Jacobean
- Montagu House, Whitehall, London, French Renaissance, demolished
- Prestwold Hall, Loughborough, Leicestershire (1842) Classical
- Revesby Abbey, Lincolnshire (1845), Elizabethan-Jacobean
- Sandon Hall, Staffordshire, (1852), Jacobean
- South Rauceby Hall, South Rauceby Lincolnshire (1842)
- Stoke Rochford Hall, Lincolnshire (1841–43)
- The Old Deanery, Lincoln, (1847)

=== Ireland ===
- Bangor Castle, County Down, Northern Ireland (1852) Elizabethan-Jacobean
- Castlewellan Castle, County Down, Northern Ireland (1856) Scottish Baronial
- Dartrey Castle, near Rockcorry in County Monaghan (1840s) Elizabethan-Jacobean, demolished
- Helen's Tower, Clandeboye Estate near Bangor (1848) Scottish Baronial
- Muckross House, Killarney, County Kerry (1843) Tudor
- Conservatory at Killruddery House (1852)

== Gallery ==
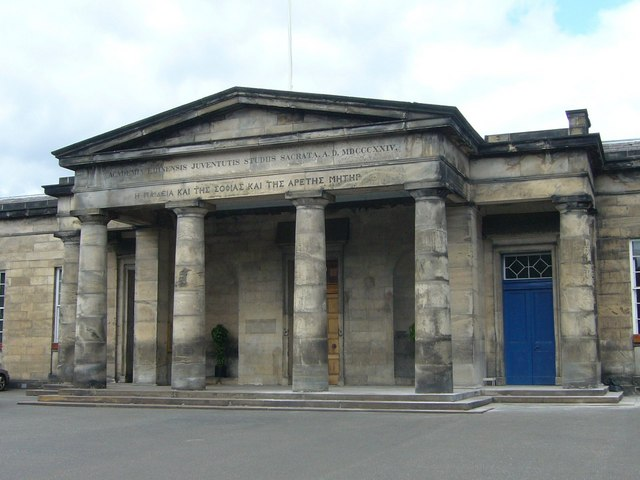
Edinburgh Academy

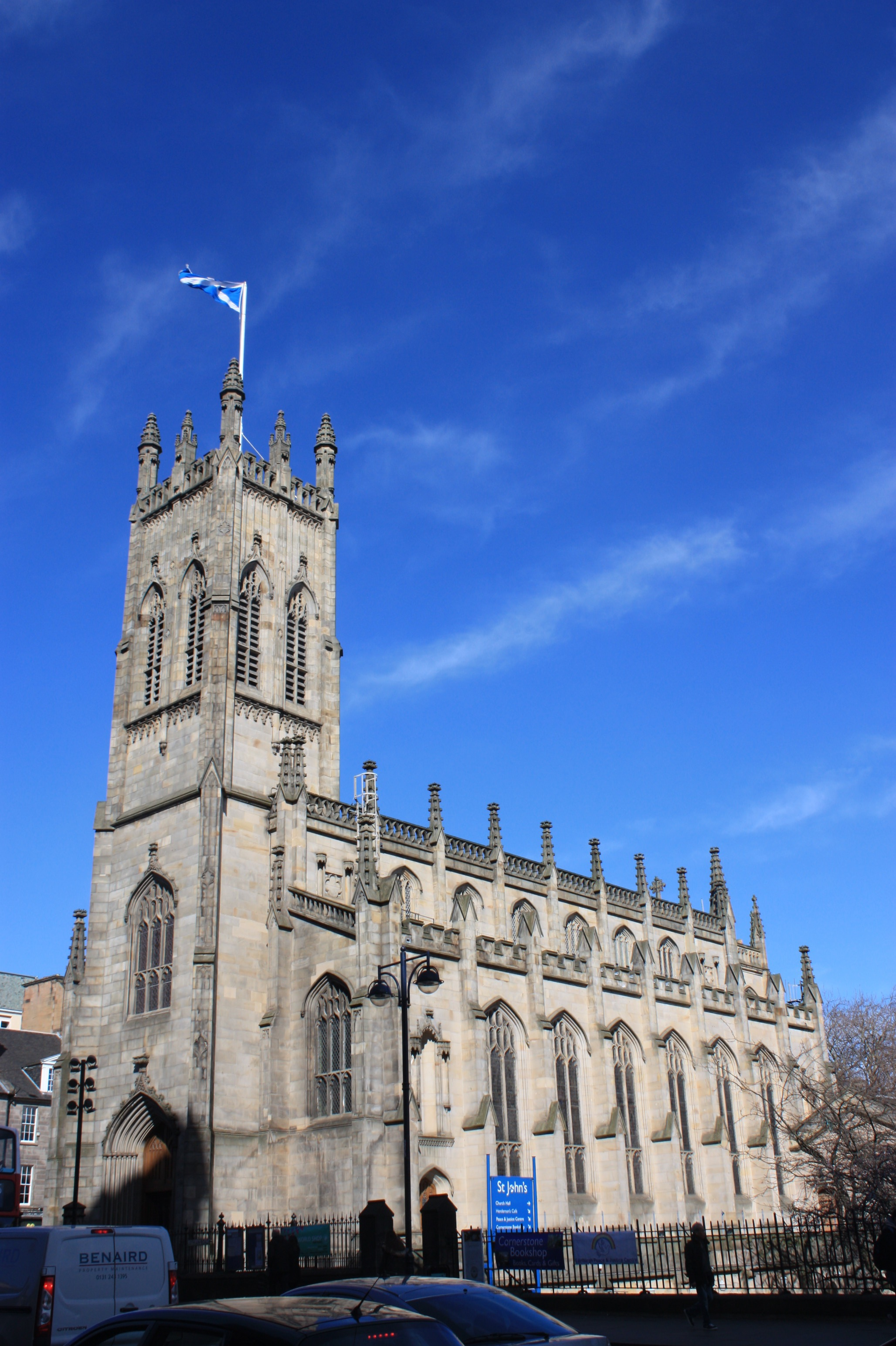
St Johns Princes Street Edinburgh

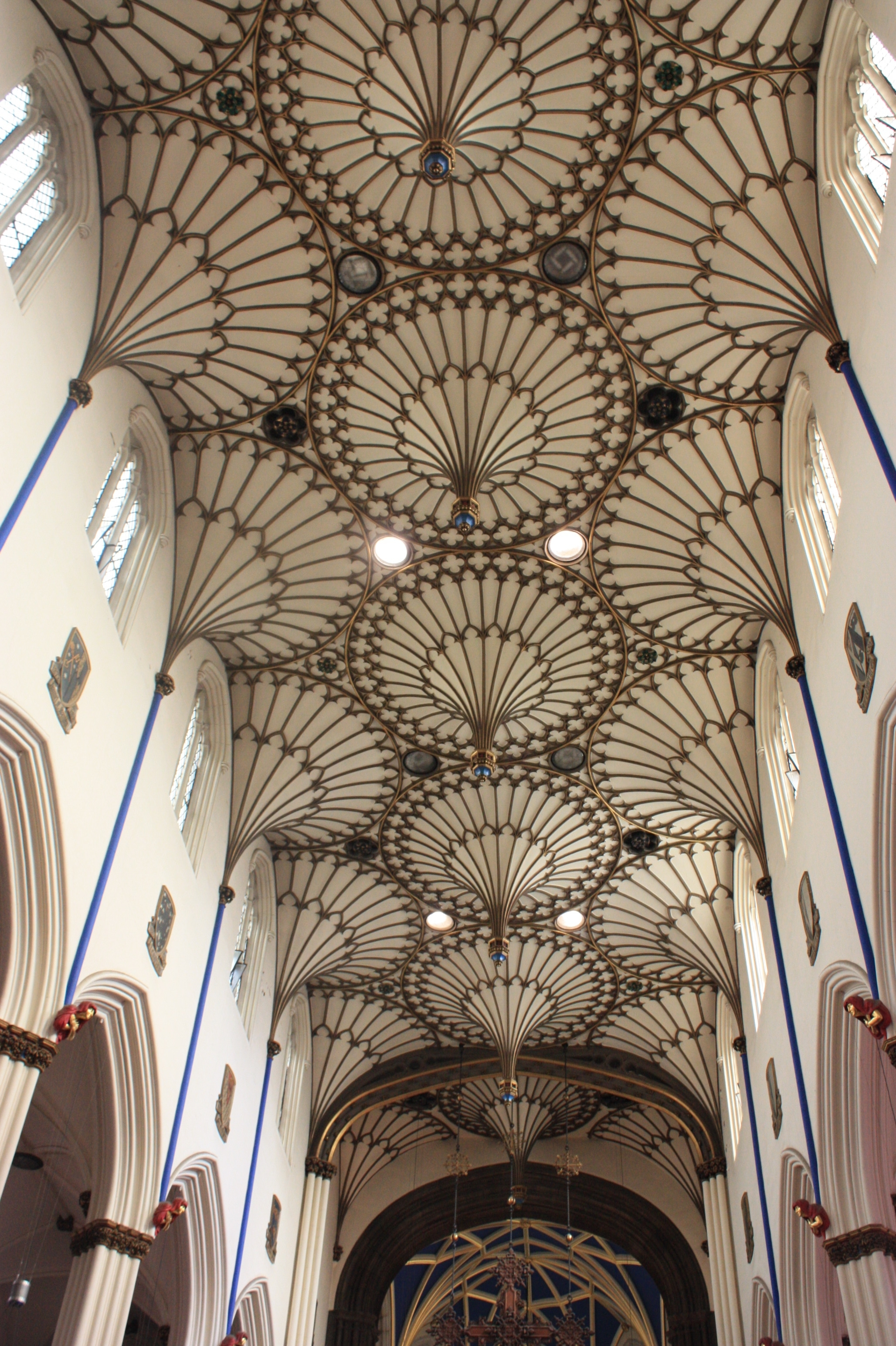
Ceiling of St Johns, Princes Street, Edinburgh

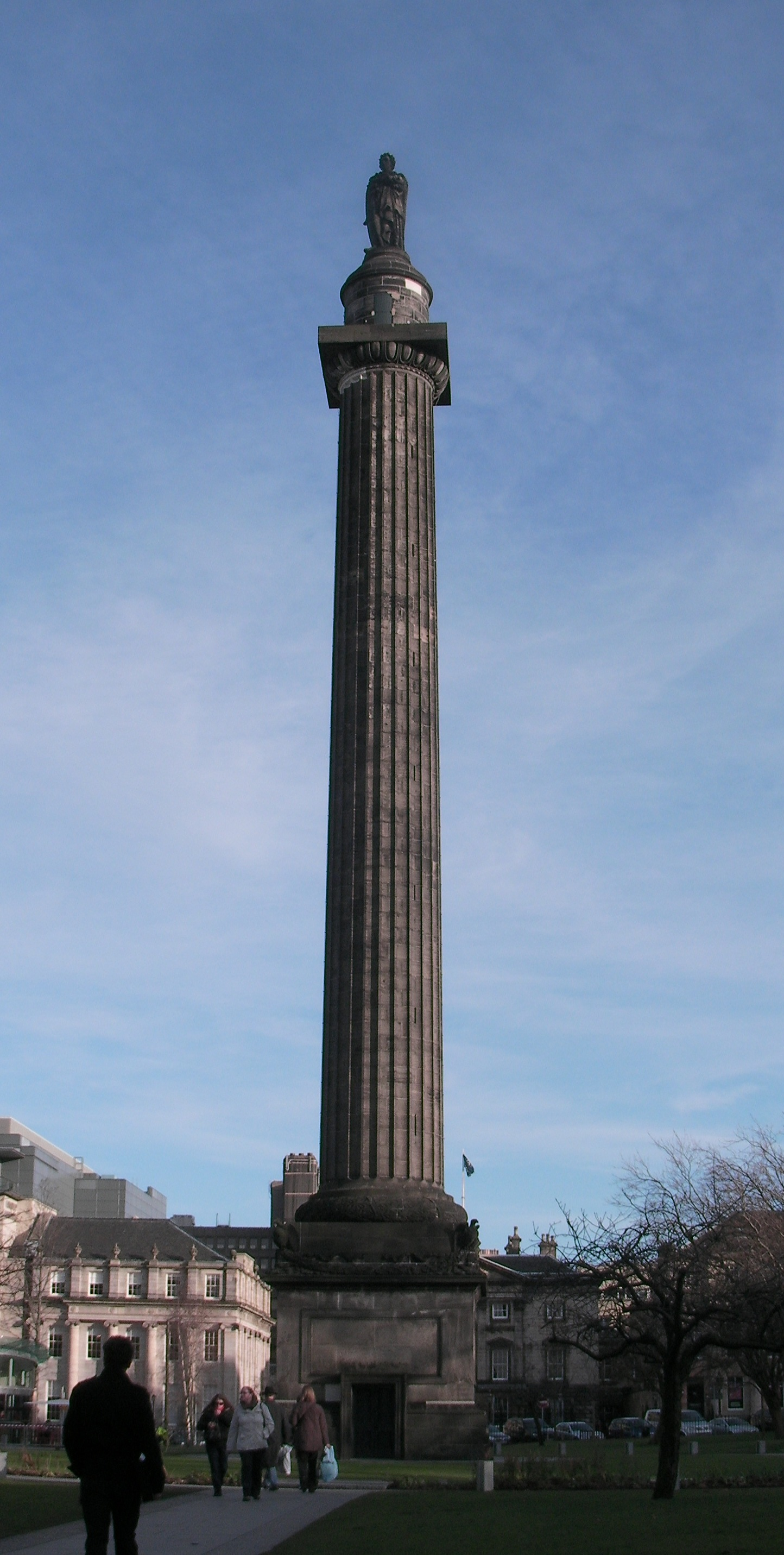
Melville Monument in St Andrew Square, Edinburgh

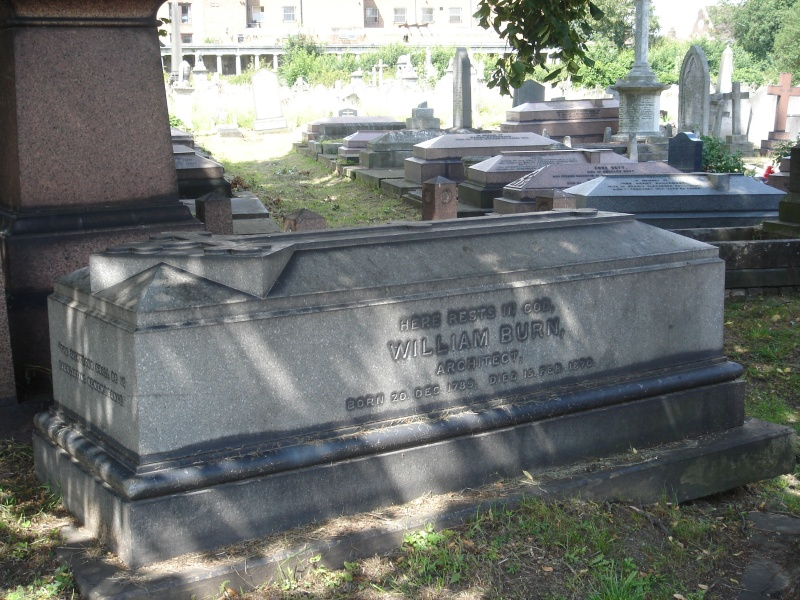
Burn's funerary monument, Kensal Green Cemetery, London

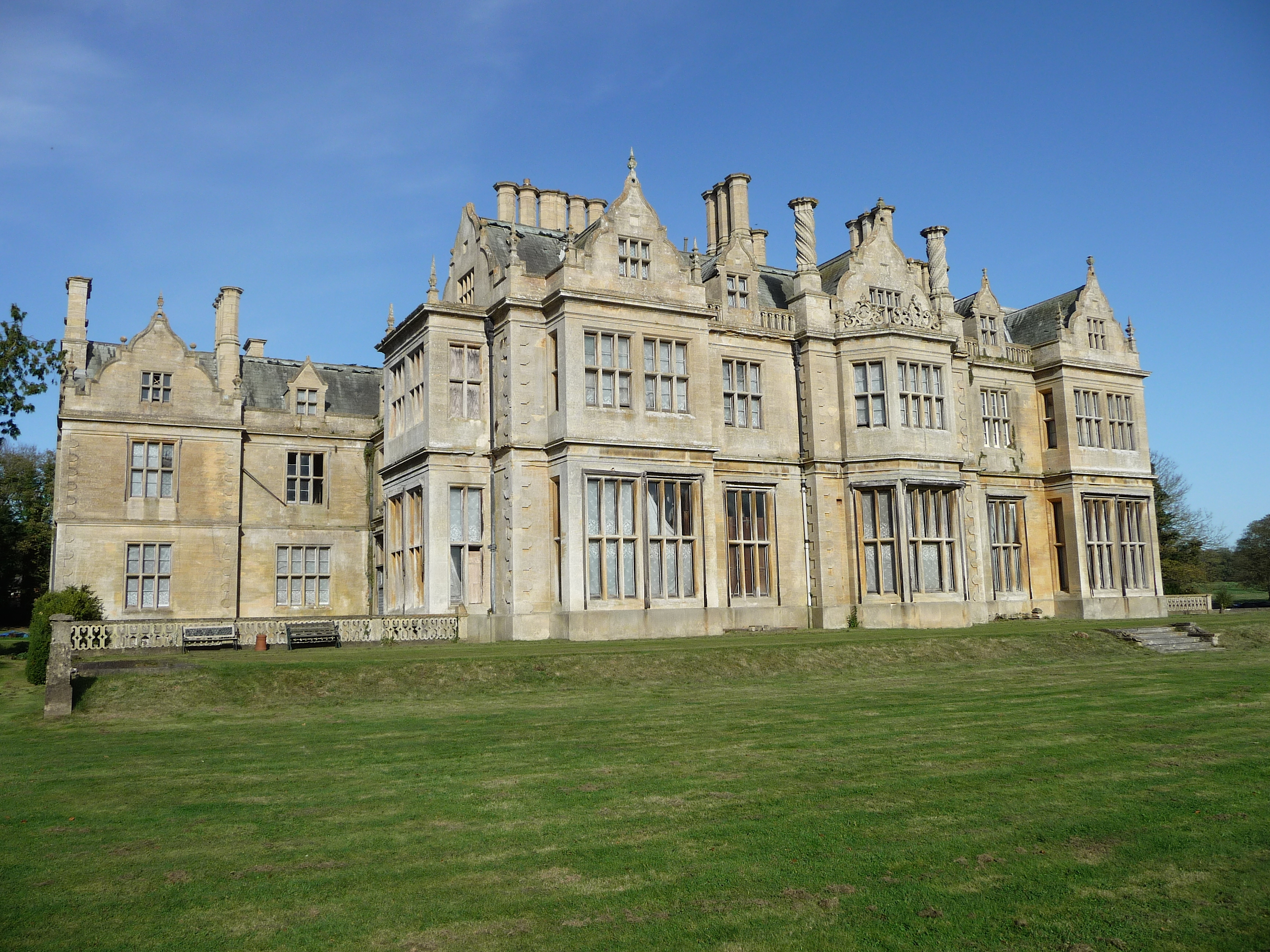
Revesby Abbey, Lincolnshire
