= Robert Forrest (sculptor) =

British artist (1790–1852)

- Born: 27 November 1790
- Died: 29 December 1852 (aged 62)
- Known for: Sculpture

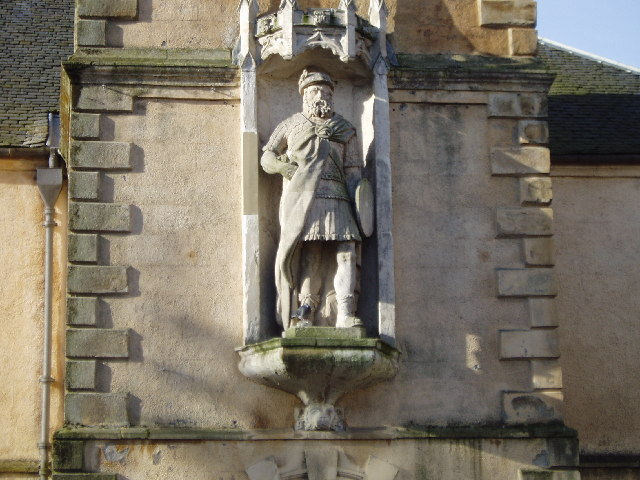
William Wallace statue by Forrest, St Nicholas Church, Lanark

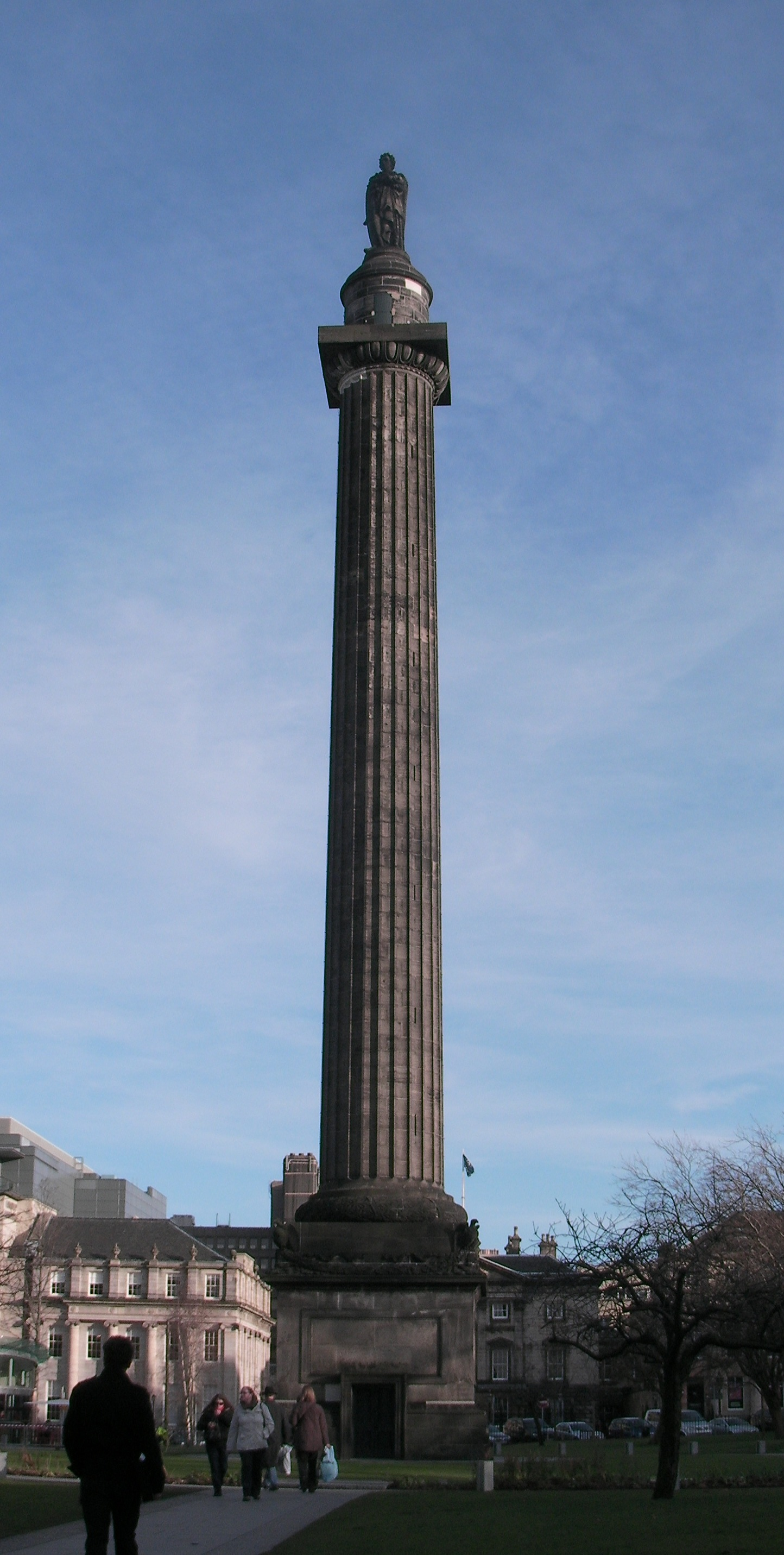
Melville Monument in St Andrew Square, Edinburgh. The column is topped by Robert Forrest's statue of Viscount Melville

Robert Forrest (27 November 1790 – 29 December 1852) was a Scottish monumental sculptor, receiving many important commissions in the early 19th century.

He was self-taught, beginning his working life as a mason in a stone quarry in Clydesdale. Allegedly his first patron, Colonel Gordon, discovered him in 1817, carving figures of animals in his quarry. His first commissioned work was a figure of Bacchus for the Colonel. Enough commissions followed to allow him to adopt sculpture as his sole profession. He set up studio on the edge of a quarry near Lanark, living in nearby Carluke. Early works included "Old Norval", "Falstaff" and "Rob Roy".

On Calton Hill in Edinburgh, he built a hall next to the National Monument of Scotland in 1832, where he exhibited equestrian statues of the Duke of Wellington, the Duke of Marlborough, Queen Mary, Lord Herries and the conversion of St Paul, together with Robert Burns, "Robert the Bruce and the Monk". This was under the auspices of the Royal Contributors to the National Monument. The exhibition of these works was apparently a popular attraction in Edinburgh for 20 years, totalling thirty of his works by the time of his death.

In his home area of Lanark he was commissioned to create a statue of William Wallace.

Around 1825 he took on John Greenshields as an assistant sculptor.

== Other principal works ==
- Statue of Viscount Melville (1822) on top of the huge monument in the centre of St Andrews Square, Edinburgh. This is said to be based on a model by Francis Chantrey. The column itself is by the architect William Burn.
- "James V of Scotland at Cramond Brig" (1836) in Clermiston in Edinburgh.
- John Knox standing on a huge column (1825) in the centre of Glasgow Necropolis.
- The Duke of Wellington (1851) sited in Falkirk.
- Monument to Robert Ferguson of Raith in Haddington (1843)
- Statue of David Ritchie, the Black Dwarf immortalised by Sir Walter Scott ay Hallyards House near Peebles.
