= Thomas Goodwillie (sculptor) =

Scottish sculptor active in Moray in the 19c

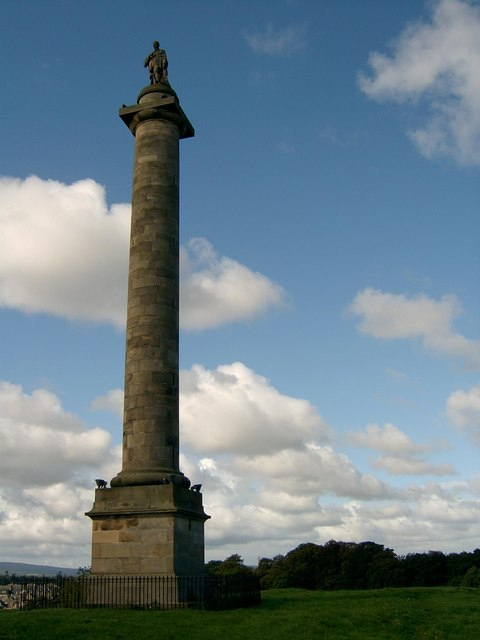
The Duke of Gordon's Monument in Elgin features a statue carved by Goodwillie

Thomas Goodwillie was a Scottish sculptor active in Moray in the nineteenth century. He is known for carving the statue of George Gordon in his robes of the office of chancellor of Marischall College, Aberdeen, in 1855, which sits atop the Duke of Gordon's Monument, and for his work with David Bryce, creating many of the sculptures that decorate Cullen House. He worked with Alexander Reid on numerous buildings, including the parish church at Inverkeithny, and the Falconer Museum in Forres, for which he carved the faces of eminent scientists into the keystones of the arched interior. He also carved the bull's head into the keystone of the arch at the west front of Alexander Ross's large Italianate range at Home Farm in Kinloss, and he created the cartouche featuring Saint Giles in the town hall in Elgin.

== Sources ==
- "Elgin, Lady Hill, Duke Of Gordon Monument". Canmore – National Record of the Historic Environment. Historic Environment Scotland.
- Walker, David W.; Woodworth, Matthew (2015). The Buildings of Scotland - Aberdeenshire: North and Moray. New Haven: Yale University Press. pp. 523–527. ISBN 978-0-300-20428-5.
