= Balintore, Angus =

Coordinates: 56.717215°N 3.166494°W

Balintore: Scottish Gaelic: Baile an Todhair
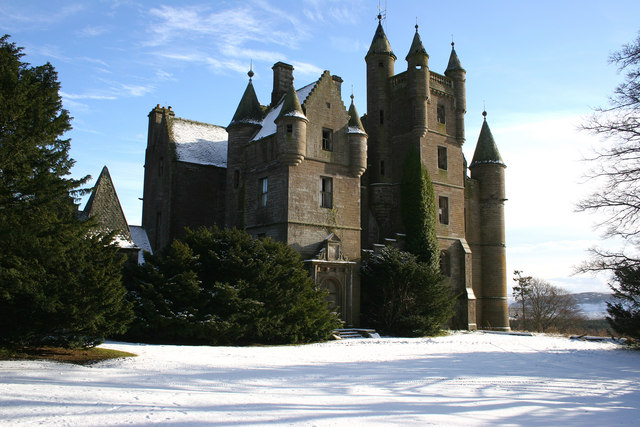
- Balintore Castle

- Location within Angus
- OS grid reference: NO287590
- Council area: Angus
- Lieutenancy area: Angus
- Country: Scotland
- Sovereign state: United Kingdom
- Post town: KIRRIEMUIR
- Postcode district: DD8
- Dialling code: 01575
- Police: Scotland
- Fire: Scottish
- Ambulance: Scottish
- UK Parliament: Angus
- Scottish Parliament: Angus South

Balintore (Scottish Gaelic: Baile an Todhair) is a village in Angus, Scotland. It lies in Glen Isla, four miles north of the Loch of Lintrathen and seven miles west of Kirriemuir. Approximately half a mile to the east is Knowehead of Auldallan farm, where there can be found a pair of uninscribed standing stones.
