= Balintore Castle =

Castle in Scotland, built in 1860s

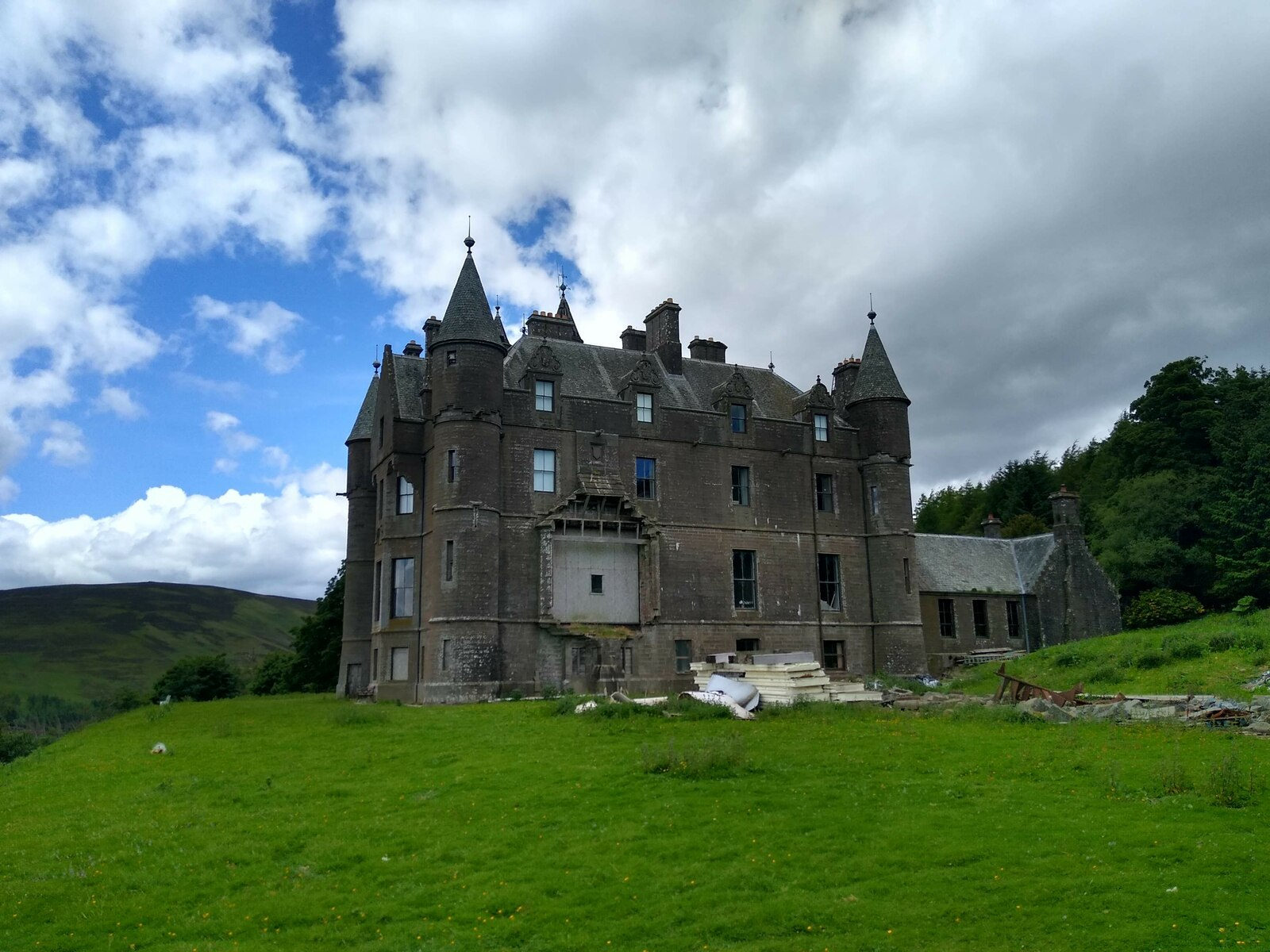
- The castle in 2022

- Location within Scotland
- Former names: Balintor Castle

General information
- Status: Completed
- Architectural style: Scottish baronial
- Classification: Residence
- Location: Angus, Balintore, Angus, Scotland
- Coordinates: 56°43′3″N 3°9′40″W
- Named for: Balintor Tower (incorporated into structure)
- Construction started: 16th Century
- Landlord: Dr. David Johnston

Design and construction
- Architect: William Burn

Renovating team
- Architect: Dr. Paul Bradley

Balintore Castle is a Victorian Category A listed building in Scotland. The castle occupies an elevated site in moorland above Balintore village, a few miles north of the Loch of Lintrathen, near Kirriemuir, Angus.

A typical example of the Scottish Baronial style, it features an abundance of turreted towers and gables, and a now-missing oriel window. The main tower is topped by a balustraded viewing platform similar to that of Buchanan Castle.

The centrepiece of the interior is the great hall, and there is also a gallery, bedrooms, a dinner service room, a women servant's sitting room, a brushing room, a beer cellar, a lumber room, a butler's pantry, a dining room, and a library.

== History ==
A tower house named Balintor existed on the site in the late 16th century, according to Timothy Pont's maps.

Balintore Castle was commissioned as a sporting lodge by David Lyon, MP. It was designed in 1859 by the architect William Burn. Latterly, the castle was used only during the shooting season.

In the 1960s, it was decided not to repair the extensive dry rot, and it was abandoned. The castle then stood empty until 2007, during which time its condition deteriorated to point of endangering the structure. Balintore Castle has been listed in the Buildings at Risk Register for Scotland since it started in 1990. Angus Council used its compulsory purchase powers to buy it from its absentee Far Eastern owners, and it is now in the hands of a Scotsman who is restoring it and residing there.

== Gallery ==
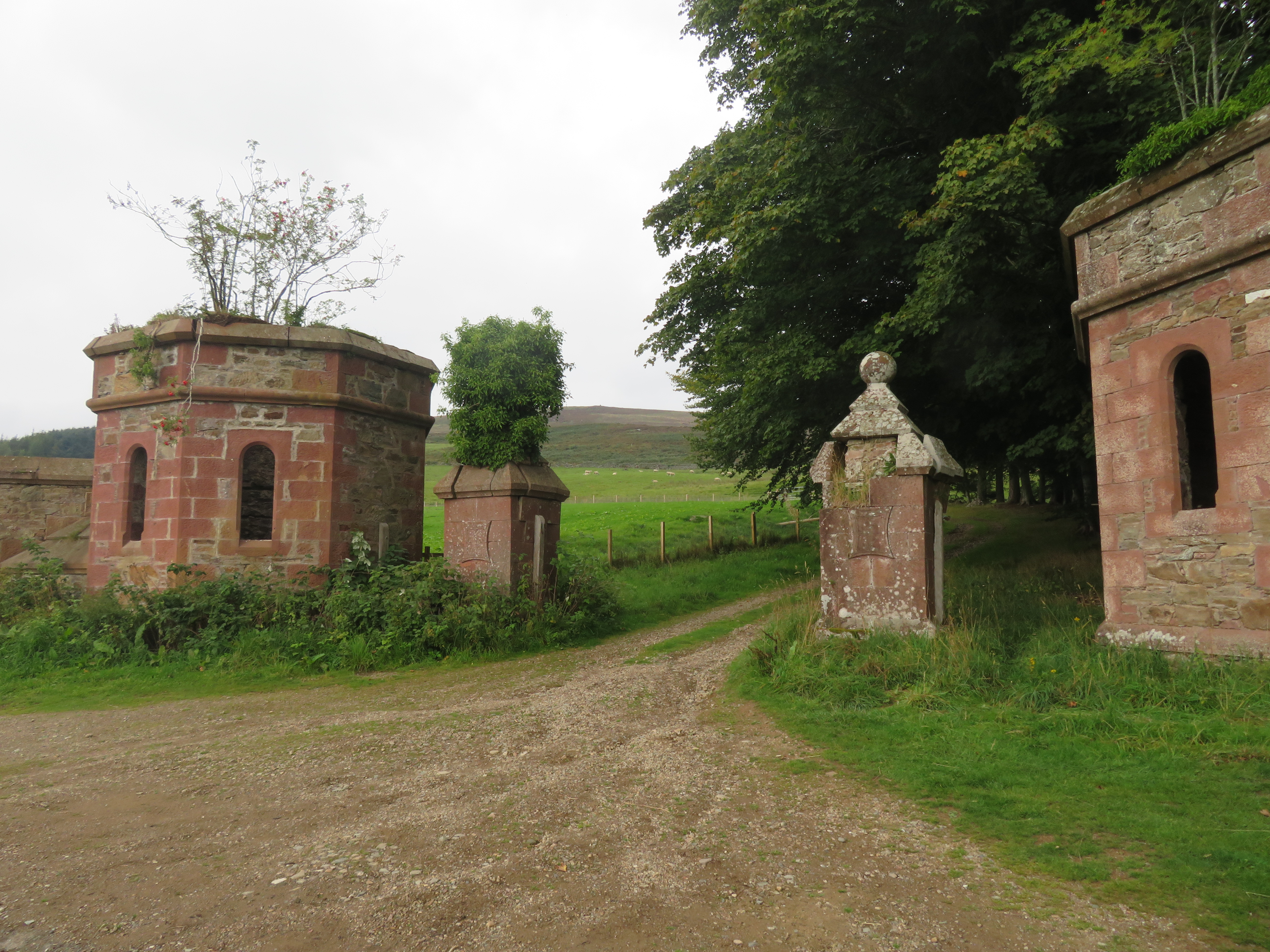
Main entrance in 2021

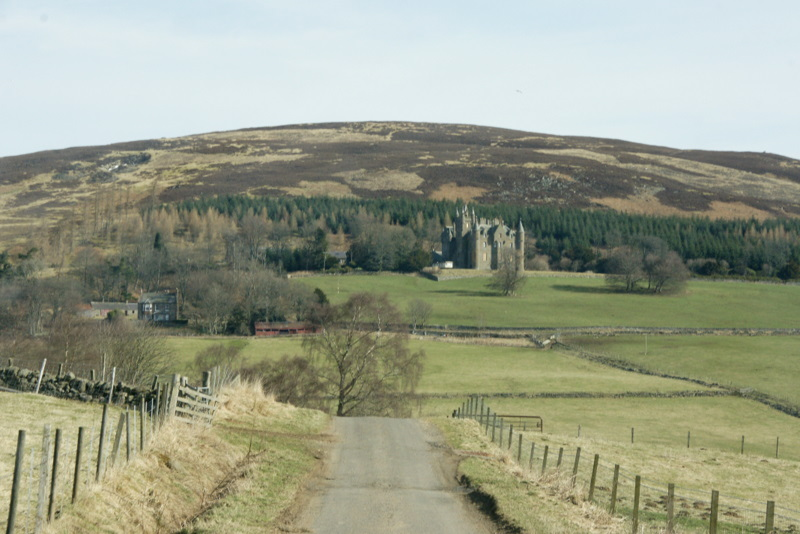
View of the castle in 2010

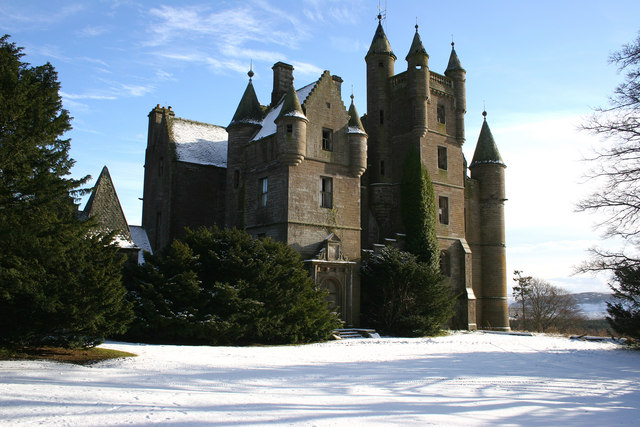
The castle in 2007

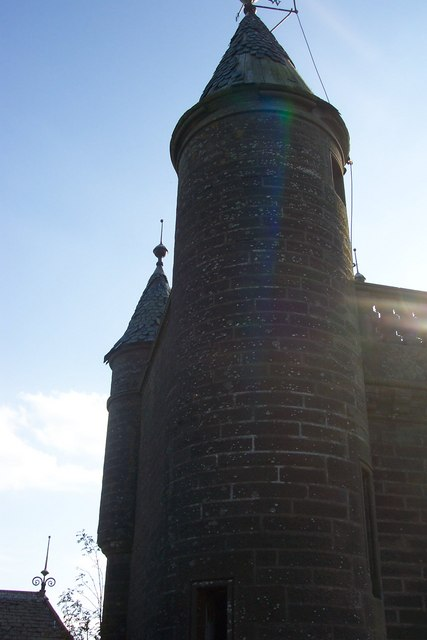
Castle tower in 2006

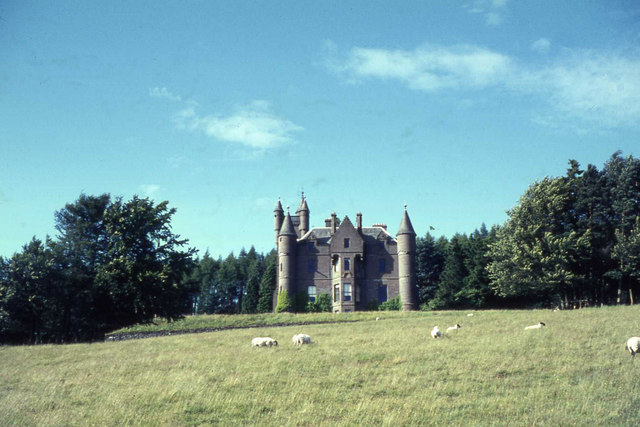
The castle in 1966
