= St Andrew Square, Edinburgh =

Garden square in Edinburgh, Scotland

St Andrew Square
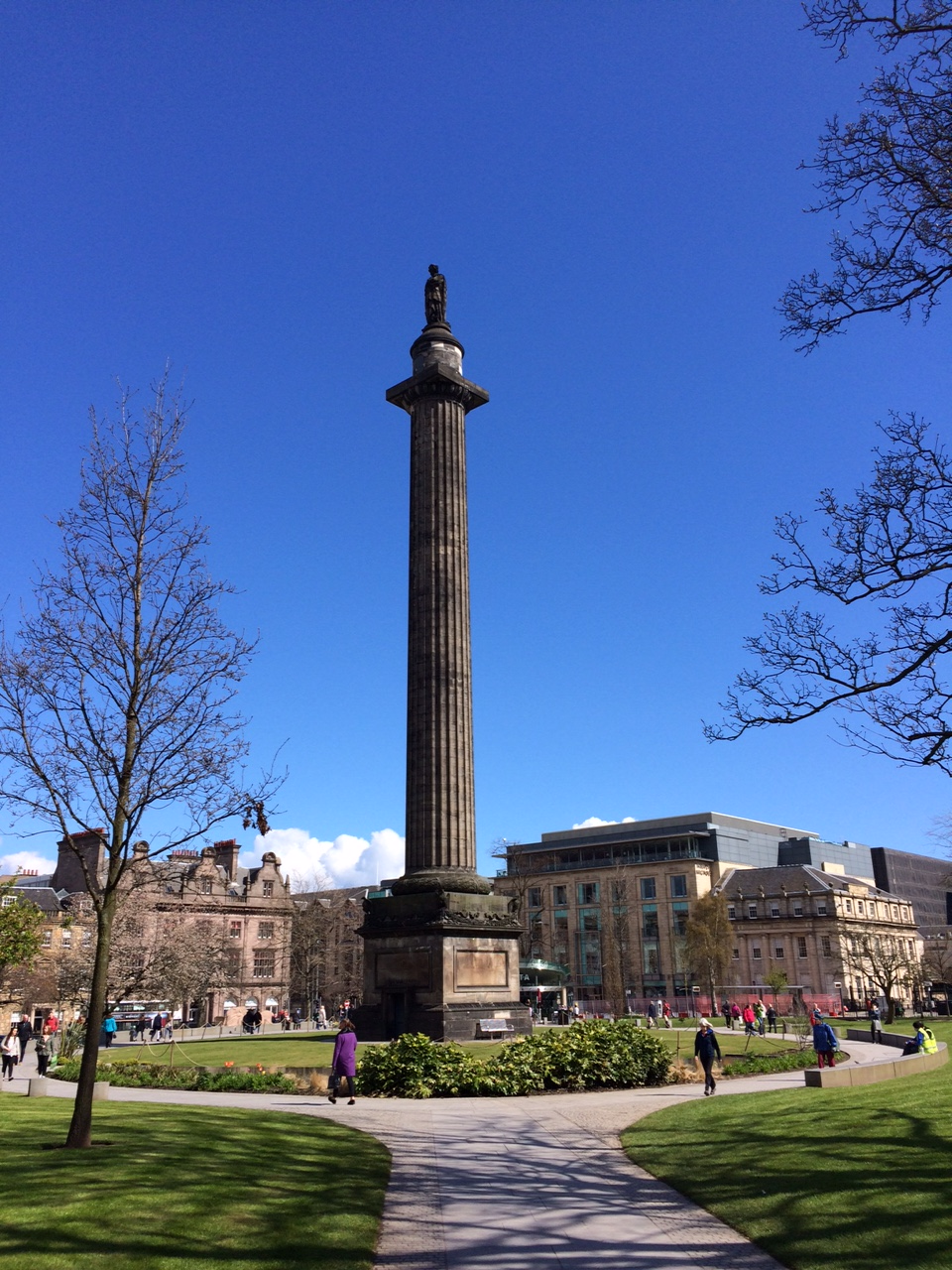
- View over the square, showing the Melville Monument
- Interactive map of St Andrew Square
- Type: Public square
- Maintained by: Essential Edinburgh
- Location: Edinburgh, Scotland, UK
- Coordinates: 55°57′15″N 3°11′35″W

An aerial view of St Andrew Square

St Andrew Square is a garden square in Edinburgh, Scotland, located at the east end of George Street.

The construct of St Andrew Square began in 1772, as the first part of the New Town, designed by James Craig. Within six years of its completion St Andrew Square became one of the most desirable and most fashionable residential areas in the city. As the 19th century came to a close, St Andrew Square evolved into the commercial centre of the city.

Most of the square used to be made up of major offices of banks and insurance companies, making it one of the major financial centres in Scotland. At one time, St Andrew Square could claim to be the richest area of its size in the whole of Scotland.

The gardens are owned by a number of private parties and belong to the collection of New Town Gardens. They were made open to the public in 2008 and are managed by Essential Edinburgh.

The square has several shops, including the department store Harvey Nichols and the designer precinct Multrees Walk.

It is also home to The Edinburgh Grand Hotel and apartments, as well as a series of London chain restaurants and bars on its south side, such as Hawksmoor, Drake & Morgan, Dishoom and The Ivy.

== Points of interest ==
Dominating the centre of St Andrew Square is the fluted column of the Melville Monument, commemorating Henry Dundas, the first Viscount Melville. The Melville Monument is surrounded by St Andrew Square Gardens, recently redesigned and opened to the public. The Building Plot, Pillar and Statue is owned by The Melville Monument Naval Committee.

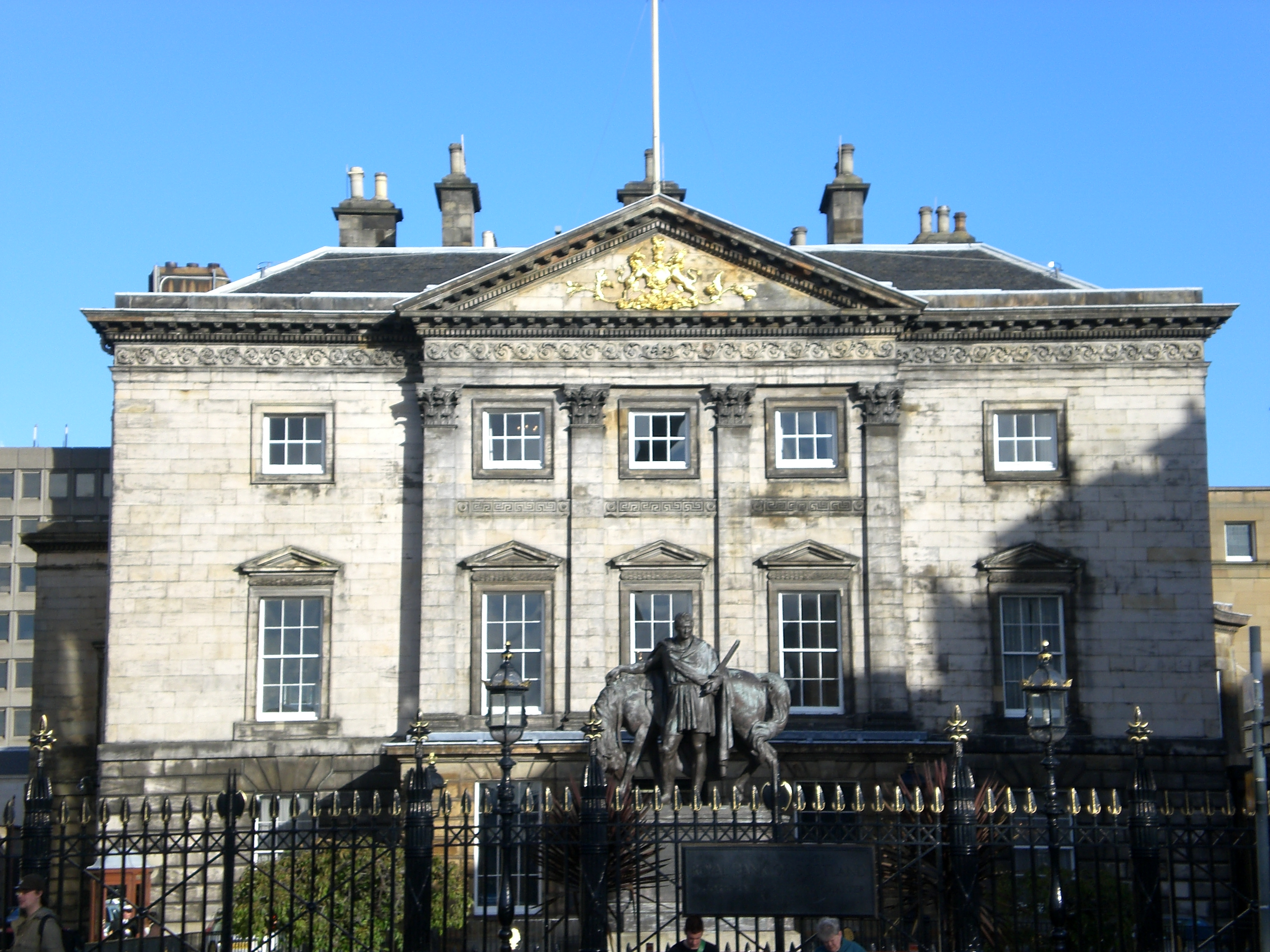
The Royal Bank of Scotland head office, formerly the home of Sir Lawrence Dundas

On the east side of the square stands the impressive mansion of Dundas House, built by Sir William Chambers for Sir Lawrence Dundas between 1772 and 1774. Once the intended site for St Andrew's Church, Dundas House became the head office of the Royal Bank of Scotland in 1825. Architectural features of Dundas House are represented today on the "Ilay" series of banknotes issued by the Royal Bank; the building's Palladian facade features on the obverse of each note, as the background graphic on both sides of the notes is a radial star design which is based on the ornate ceiling of the banking hall inside Dundas House, designed by John Dick Peddie in 1857.

A short distance from Dundas House, down George Street, is where St. Andrew's Church was built in 1784. In 1806 the head office of the British Linen Bank moved to St Andrew Square. The building was a branch of the Bank of Scotland until 2016. St. Andrew Square was also home to the National Bank of Scotland, which was headquartered at No. 42, until it merged with the Royal Bank of Scotland in 1969.

Beneath the eastern streets of the square lies the long disused Scotland Street Tunnel, which continues under the New Town to Canonmills. The tunnel was built in 1847 as part of the Edinburgh, Leith and Newhaven Railway. Its southern end was demolished in the 1980s during the construction of the Waverley Market shopping centre.

== Notable residents ==
Many famous Scots occupied the residences of St Andrew Square. On the north side of the square, No. 21 was the birthplace of Lord Henry Brougham in 1778. His family was one of the first families to take up residency in St Andrew Square. Another resident was philosopher and economist David Hume, friend of architect Robert Adam. Hume was persuaded to move to St Andrew Square by Adam with the hopes that the recruitment of such a powerful person would induce others to cross from the Old Town to the New Town and St Andrew Square. Hume chose a site on the southwest side of the square at the corner of Princes Street and an unnamed street (later named St David Street). Also on the north side, No. 26 was the home to architect Sir William Chambers.

== Transport ==
St Andrew Square has been used as a transport hub for a number of years. The original St Andrew Square Bus station was demolished in 2000, with a modern replacement opening to the public in 2003.

=== Buses ===
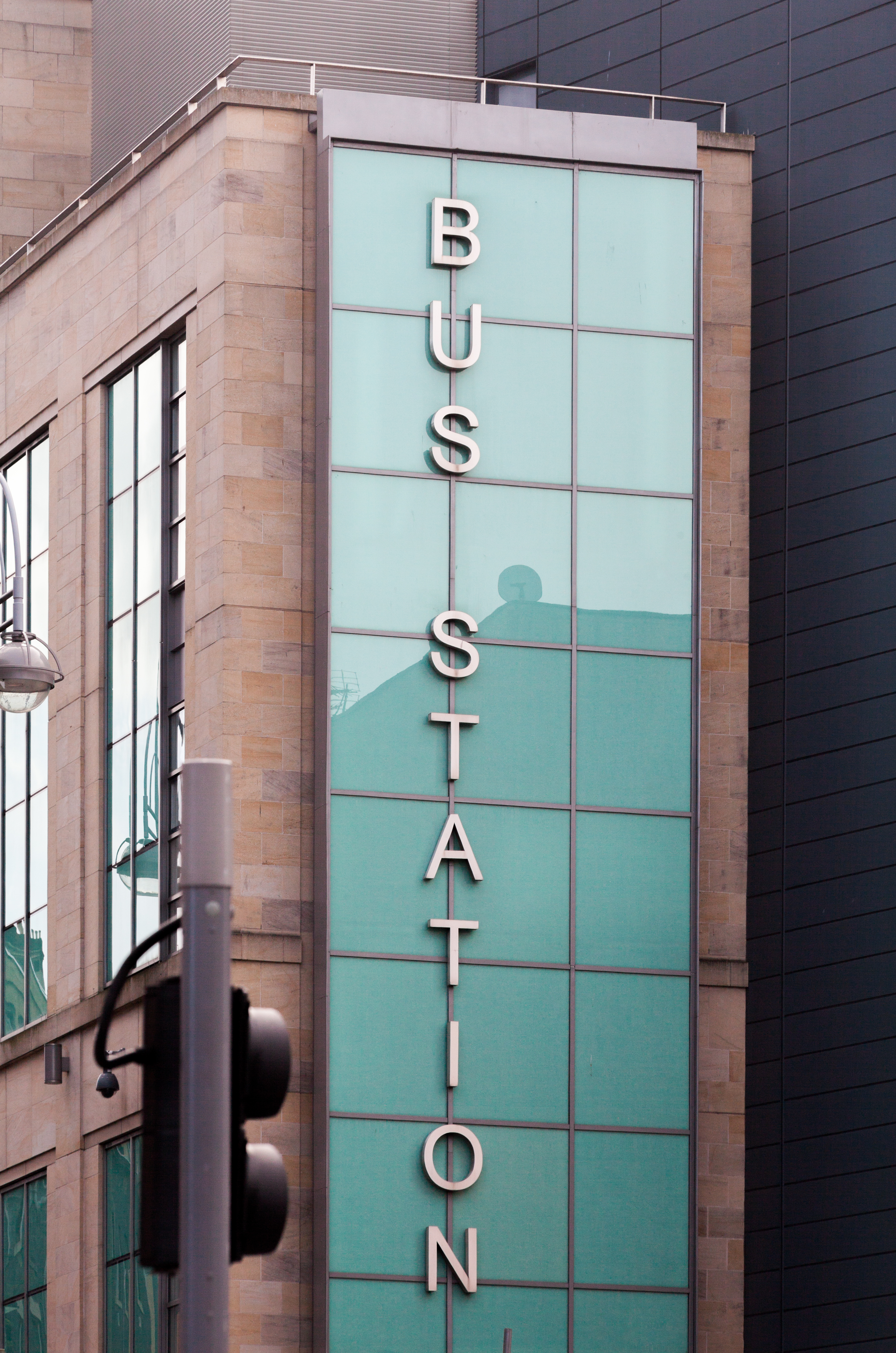
Edinburgh Bus Station

Edinburgh Bus Station is located to the east of the square. It is served by long-distance bus & coach operators, such as Scottish Citylink and Stagecoach East Scotland.

Local bus services have stops to the west side of the square on North St David Street & South St David street.

=== Tram ===
St Andrew Square tram stop is an island platform located on the east side of the square. It is the nearest stop for Edinburgh Waverley railway station which lies approximately 250m to the south, and for Edinburgh bus station which is 50m to the north.

Trams from here run west through the city to Edinburgh Airport, and north to Leith and Newhaven.

Preceding station	Edinburgh Trams	Following station
Picardy Place towards Newhaven	Newhaven – Edinburgh Airport	Princes Street towards Airport

== Bibliography ==
- Campbell, Donald. Edinburgh: A Cultural and Literary History. Northampton, MA: Interlink Books, 2004.
- Catford, E. F. Edinburgh: The Story of a City. London: Hutchinson & Co. Ltd., 1975.
- Daiches, David. Edinburgh. London: Hamish Hamilton Limited, 1978.
- Geddie, John. Romantic Edinburgh. 2nd ed. Edinburgh (London, Glasgow): Sands & Co., 1911.
- Lang, Theo, ed. The Queen’s Scotland: Edinburgh and the Lothians. London: Hodder and Stoughton, 1952.
- Wilson, Neil, and Tom Smallman. Edinburgh. 2nd ed. Footscray, Australia: Lonely Planet Publications Pty Ltd., 2002.
- Youngson, A. J. The Making of Classical Edinburgh: 1750 – 1840. Edinburgh: Edinburgh University Press, 1968.
