= List of closes on the Royal Mile =

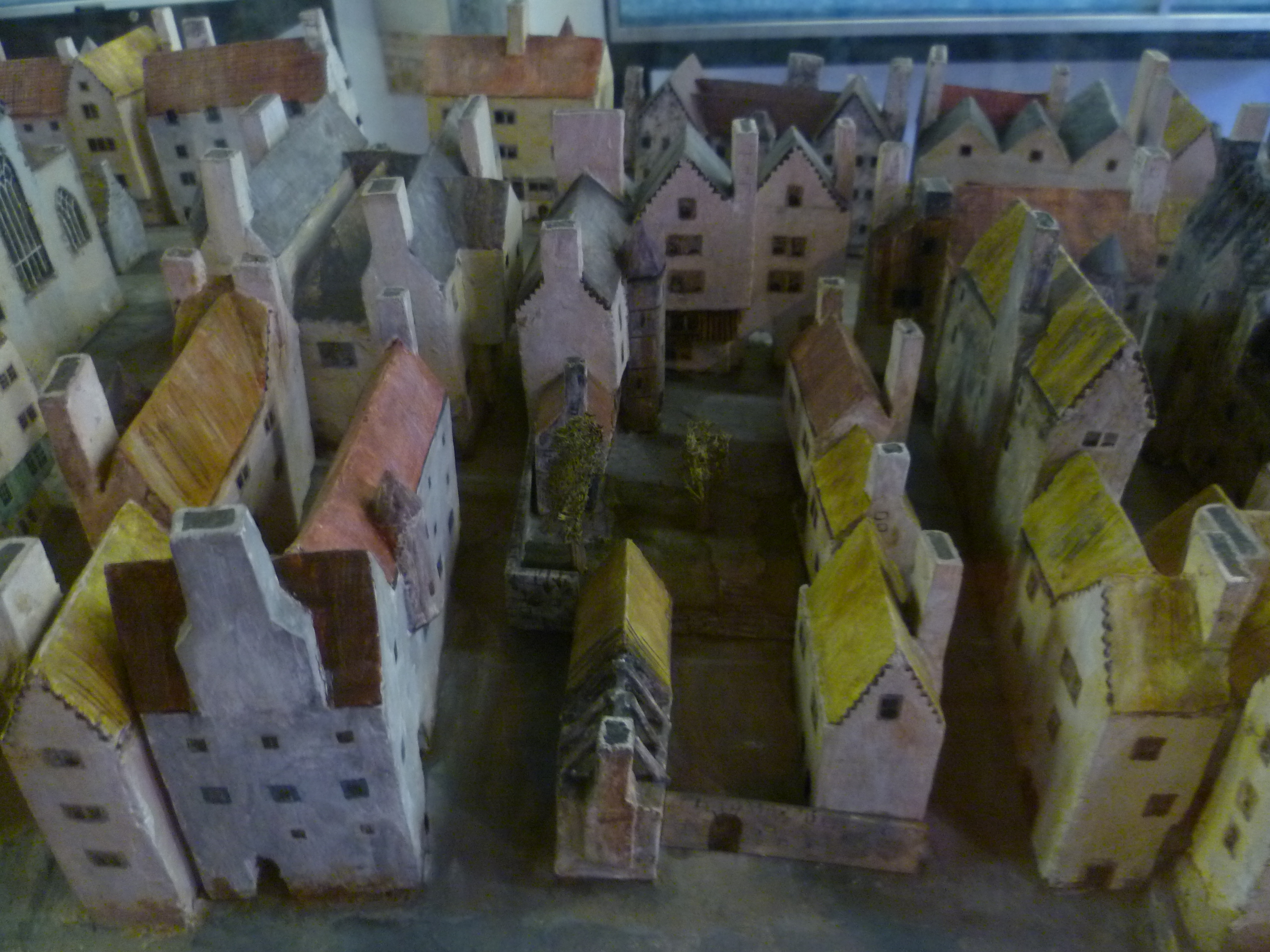
Part of a model showing the layout of closes off the Royal Mile

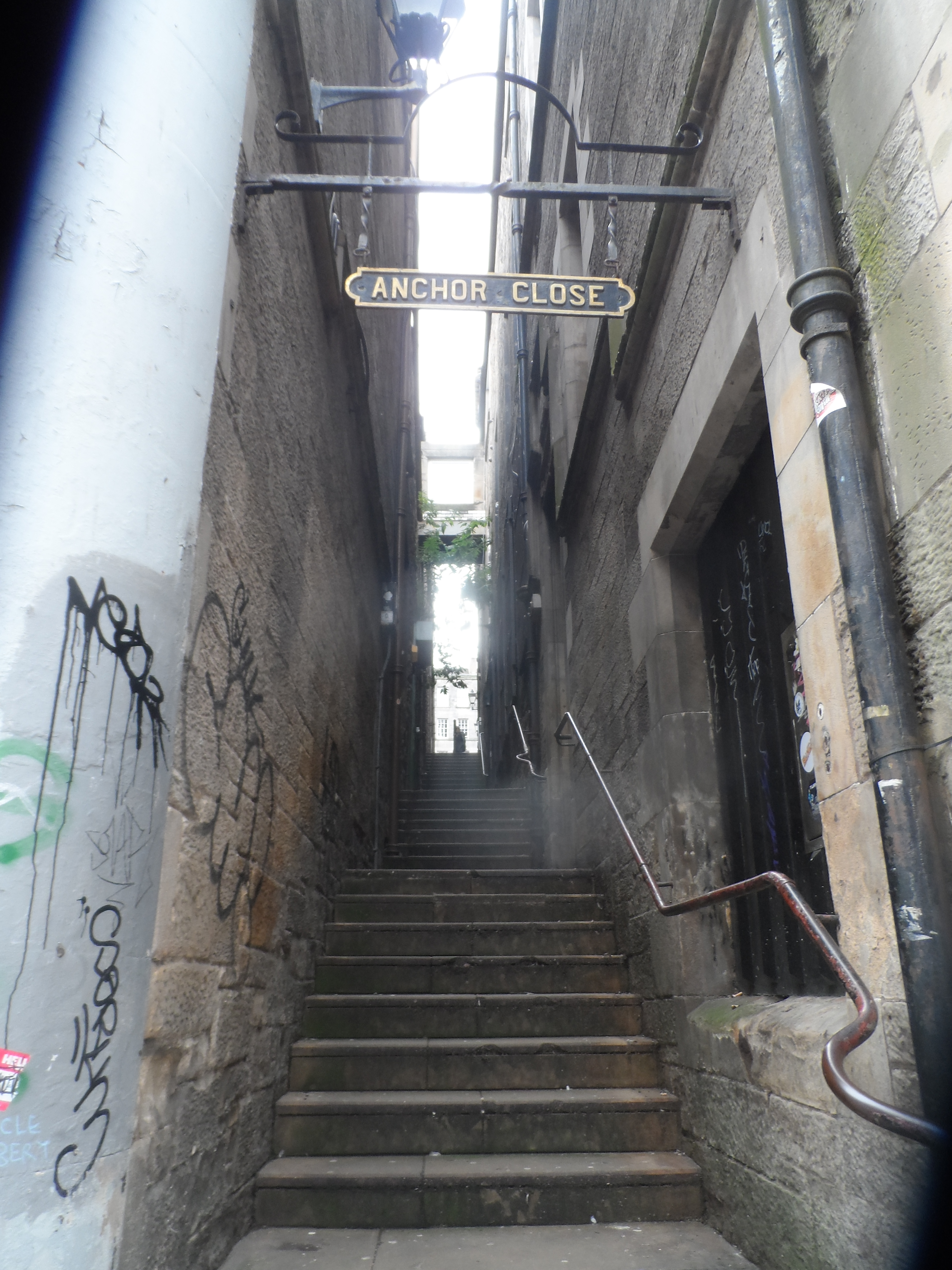
Anchor Close

The Old Town in Edinburgh consisted originally of the city's main street, now known as the Royal Mile, and the small alleyways and courtyards that led off it to the north and south. These were usually named after a memorable occupant of one of the apartments reached by the common entrance, or a trade plied by one or more residents. Generically such an alleyway is termed a close /ˈkloʊs/, a Scots term for alleyway, although it may be individually named close, entry, court, or wynd. Closes developed from tofts and originally were private property, hence gated and closed to the public, whereas a wynd is an open thoroughfare, usually wide enough for a horse and cart. Most slope steeply down from the Royal Mile creating the impression of a herring-bone pattern formed by the main street and side streets when viewed on a map. Many have steps and long flights of stairs.

As a result of Edinburgh coming under frequent attack by English forces, the city experienced a high level of urban density, with closes tending to be narrow and surrounded by tall buildings on both sides, giving them a canyon-like appearance and atmosphere. The Royal Mile comprises five linear, conjoined streets: Castle Hill, Lawnmarket, High Street, Canongate and Abbey Strand. Closes are listed below from west to east, divided between the south and north sides of the street. This list names closes currently in existence. Since the Council encourages recreation of closes in new developments the list is not static. New buildings traditionally incorporate the name of the close that historically existed on the same site.

== Castlehill ==
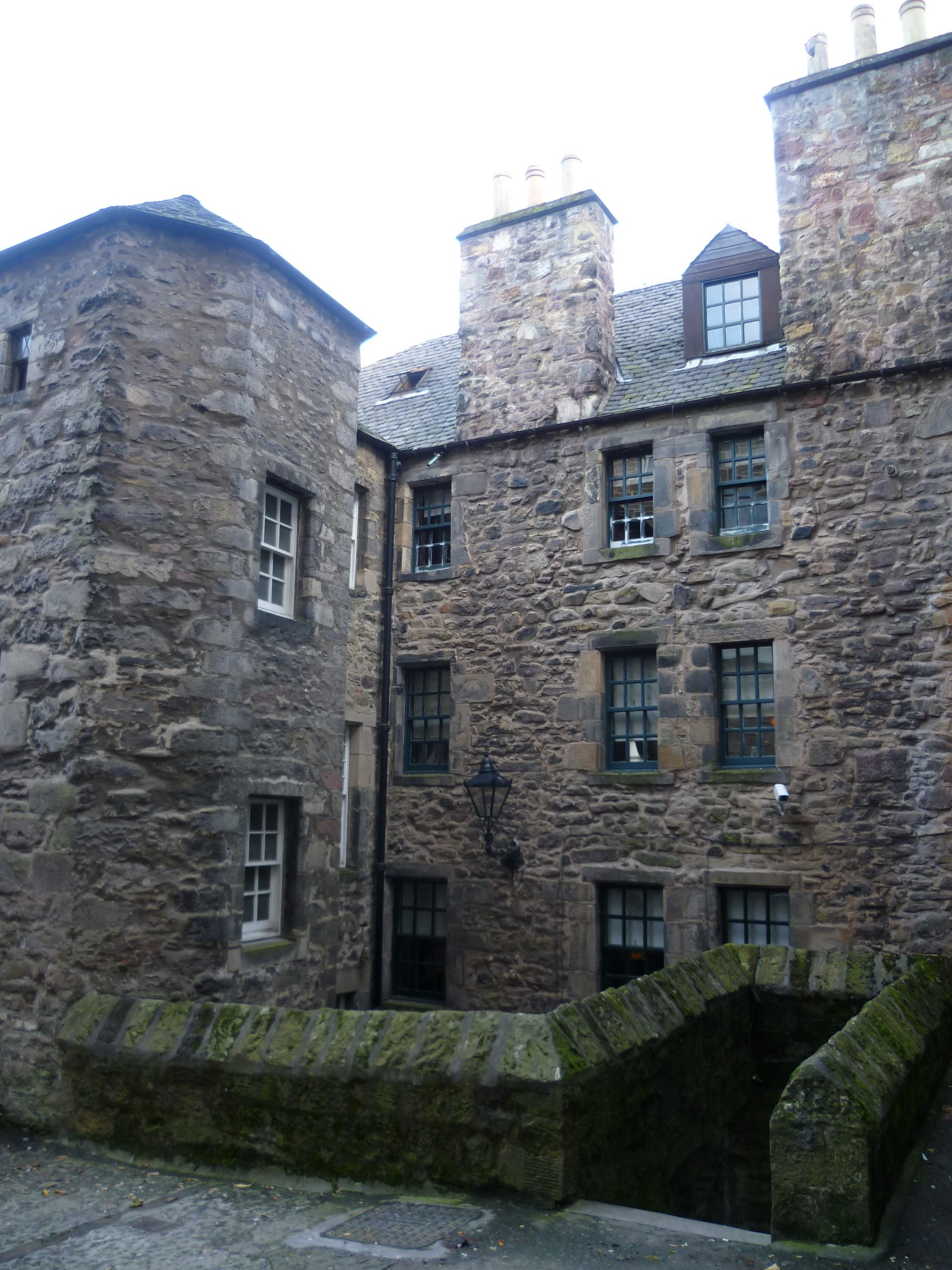
Semple's Close off Castlehill

Castlehill forms the western end of the Royal Mile, running from the Castle Esplanade to the junction of Johnston Terrace.

South

- Castle Wynd (in two sections, North and South). This connects Castlehill with the Grassmarket via Johnston Terrace. With buildings on only one side, it is not typical of most closes.
- Old Distillery Close (private / dead end)
- Boswell's Court (named after an uncle of Dr. Johnson's biographer, James Boswell) (private / dead end)

North

- Skinner's Close (sign only/ no route remains)
- Semple's Close (sealed/ private dead end)
- Jollie's Close (sealed/ private dead end)

== Lawnmarket ==
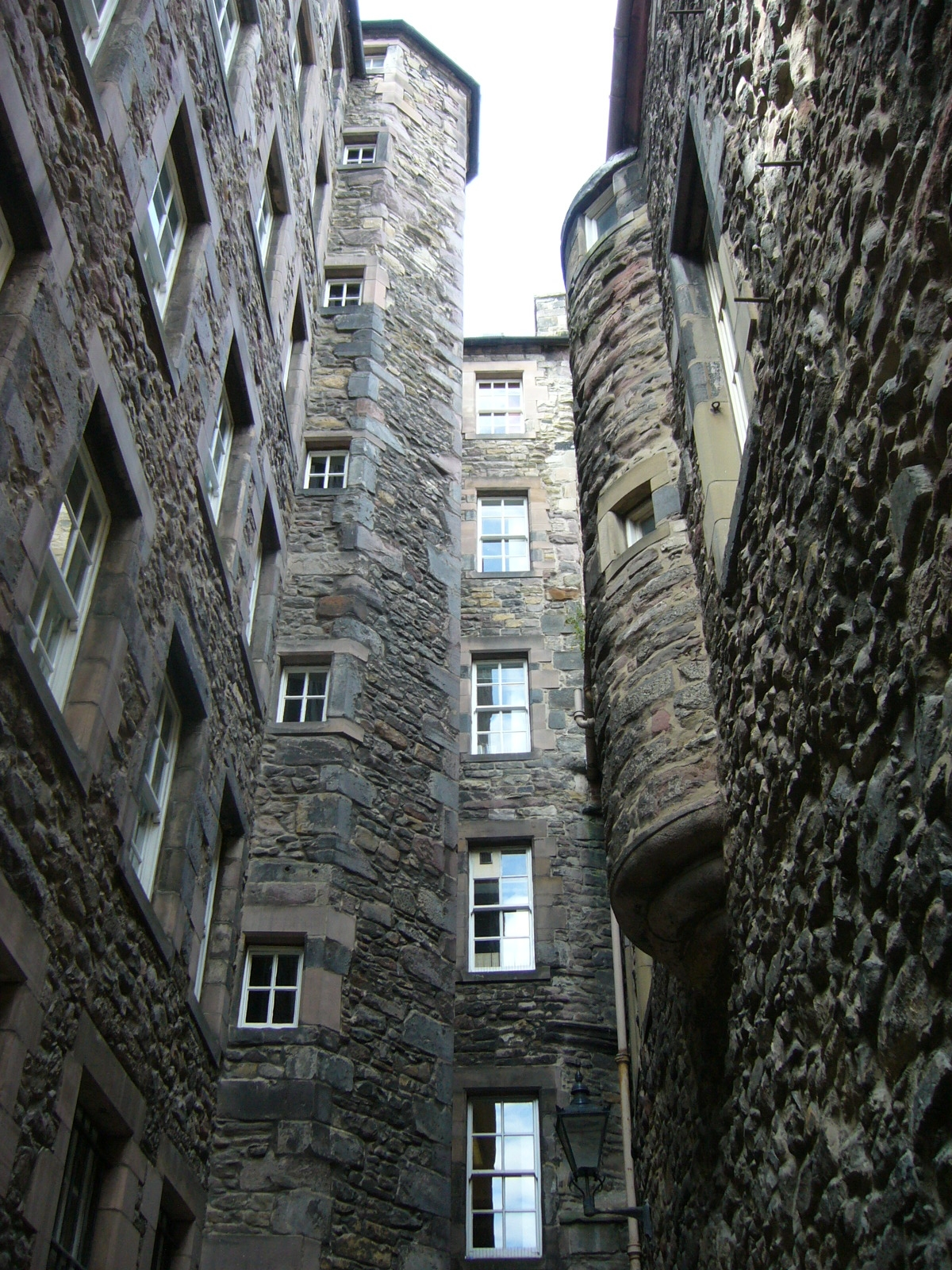
Fisher's Close off the Lawnmarket

The Lawnmarket is the section between Johnstone Terrace and West Parliament Square/Bank Street.

South

- Riddle's Court (dead end)
- Fisher's Close (public connection to Victoria Terrace)
- Brodie's Close, named after the family home of Deacon Brodie (dog-leg leading onto Fisher's Close)
- Buchanan's Close (dog-leg leading onto Fisher's Close)

North

- Mylne's Court, built by Robert Mylne
- James Court (signed as West Entry, Mid Entry, East Entry)
- Lady Stair's Close
- Wardrop's Close

== High Street ==
The High Street runs from St Giles Street to St Mary's Street, the location of the Netherbow Port, and the limit of the pre-19th century burgh of Edinburgh.

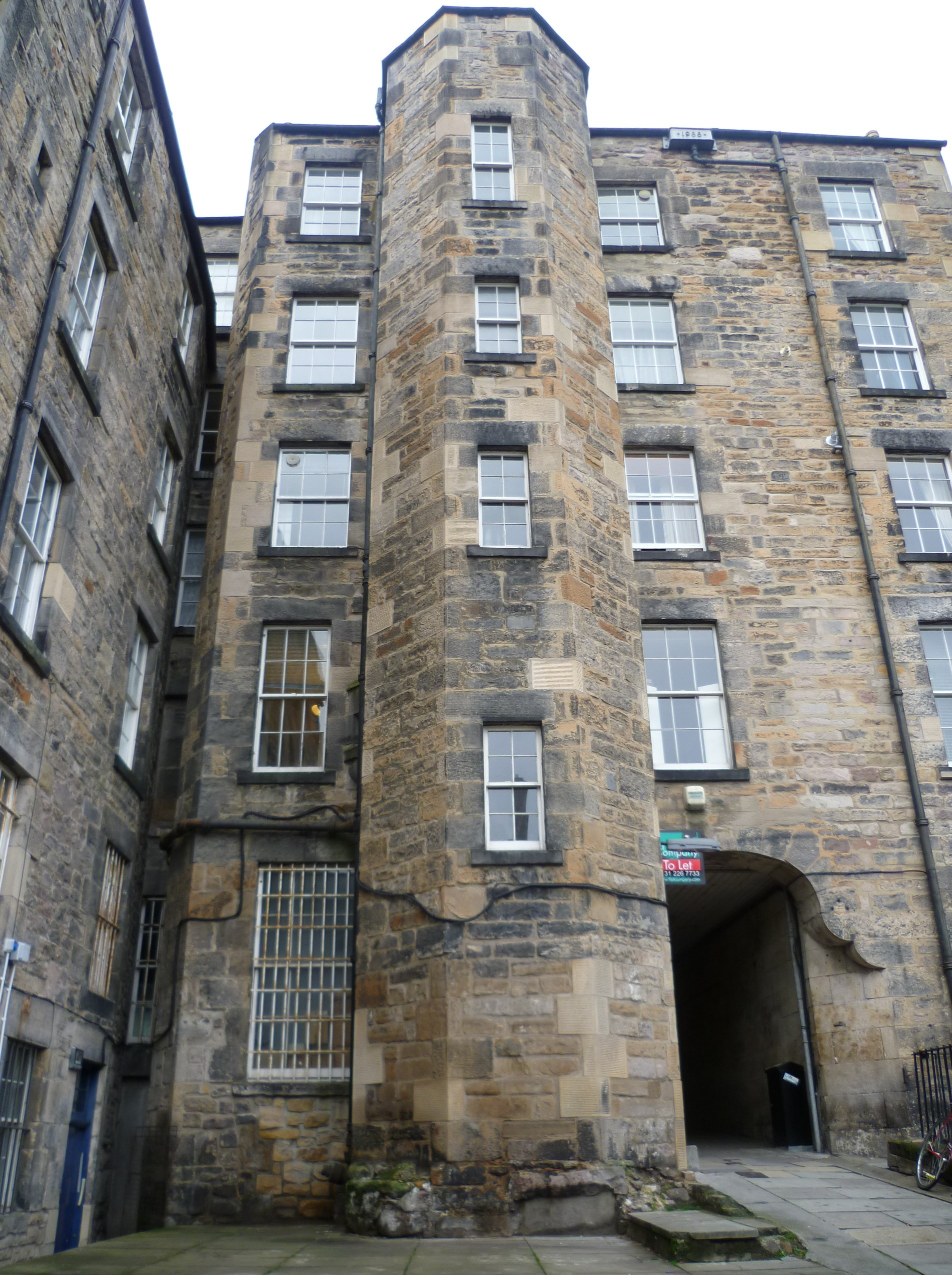
Borthwick's Close off the High Street

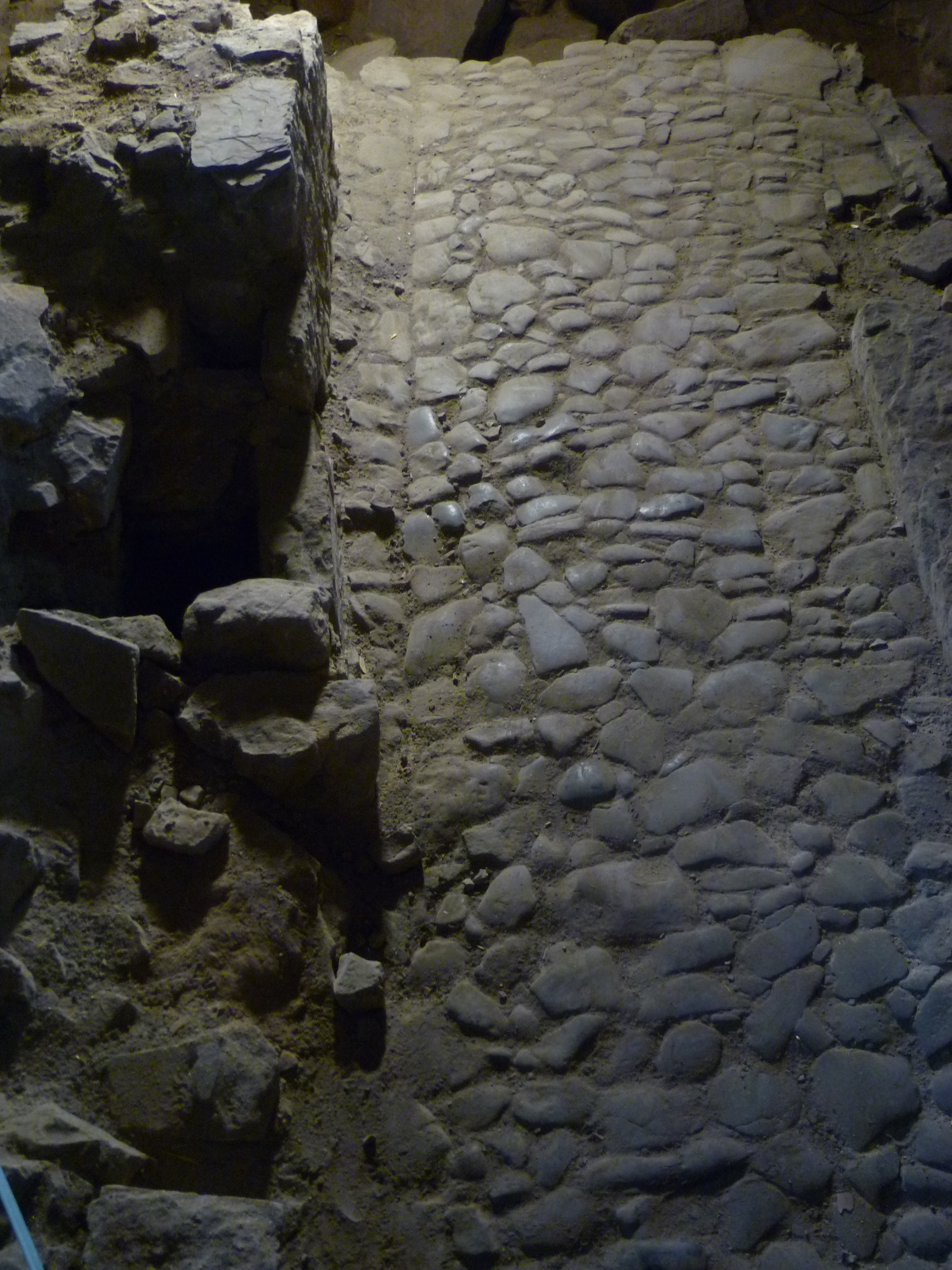
The surface of Marlin's Wynd, one of the suppressed closes of the Royal Mile. It was concealed when built over and rediscovered after excavation in 1974

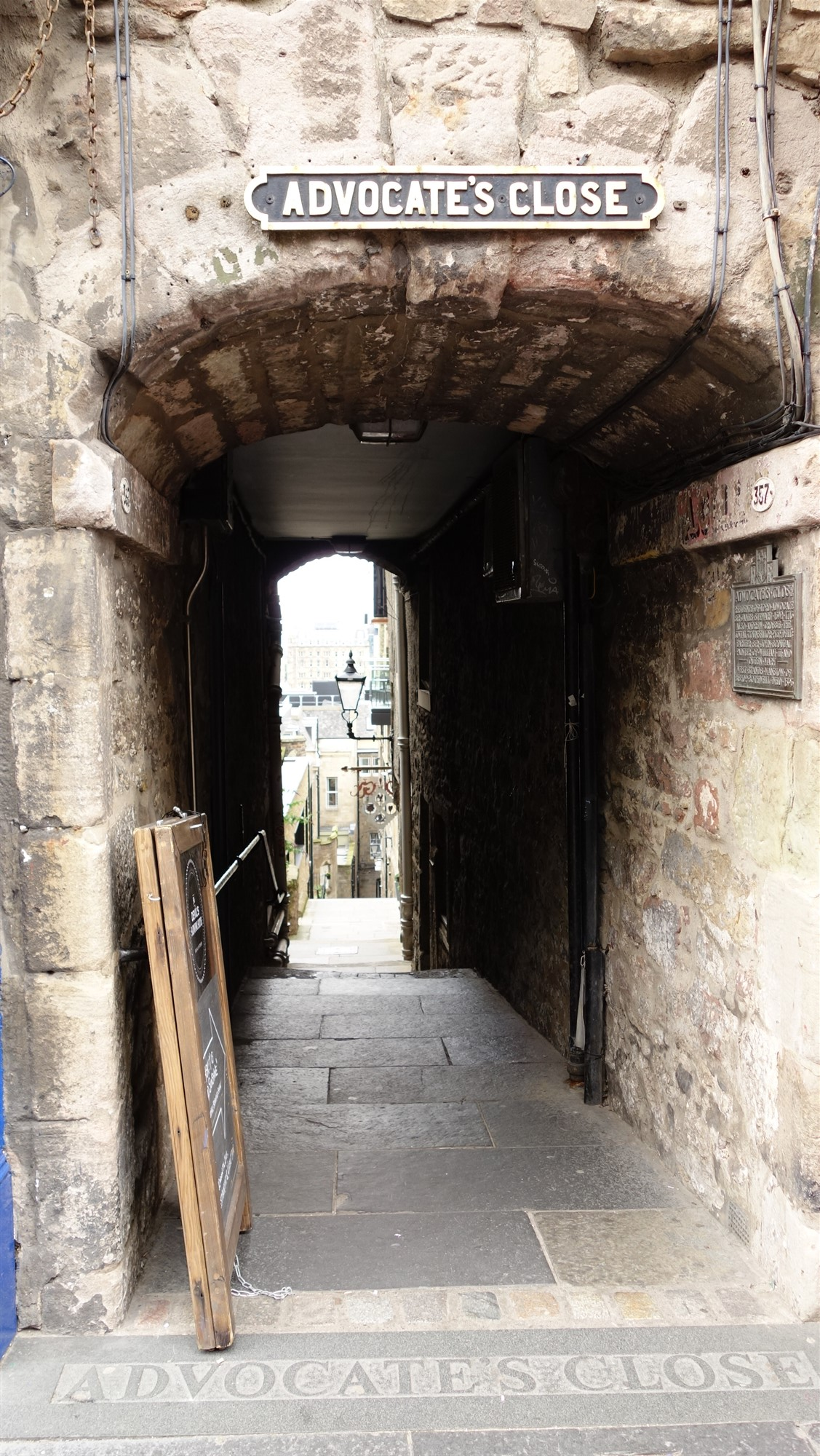
Head of Advocates Close in the High Street

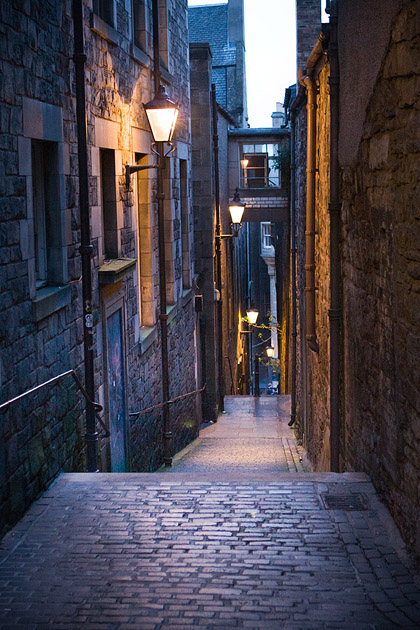
Anchor Close in twilight.

South

- Barrie's Close (dog-leg connecting Parliament Sq. to Old Fishmarket Close)
- Old Fishmarket Close (public connection to the Cowgate/open to vehicles)
- Borthwick's Close (leading to Tron Square)
- Old Assembly Close, location of the original assembly rooms
- Covenant Close (dead end)
- Burnet's Close (dead end)
- Bell's Wynd (leading to Tron Square)
- New Assembly Close, location of the later assembly rooms
- Stevenlaw's Close (connecting to Cowgate)
- Marlin's Wynd (partially preserved and on view under the Tron Kirk), named after the Merlioun family
- Dickson's Close (sign only, erected 1990)
- Cant's Close (sign only, erected 1990)
- Melrose Close (sign only, erected 1990), named for Andrew Durie, Abbot of Melrose Abbey.
- Toddrick's Wynd (sealed/private)
- South Gray's Close (connecting to Cowgate/ vehicle access from Cowgate)
- Hyndford's Close (links to South Gray's Close)
- Fountain Close (links to South Gray's Close)
- Tweeddale Court, named after the Marquess of Tweeddale. Home to several publishing houses over the centuries including Oliver & Boyd, The List, Moubray House Publishing and Canongate Books
- World's End Close (last close before reaching the former site of the town wall)

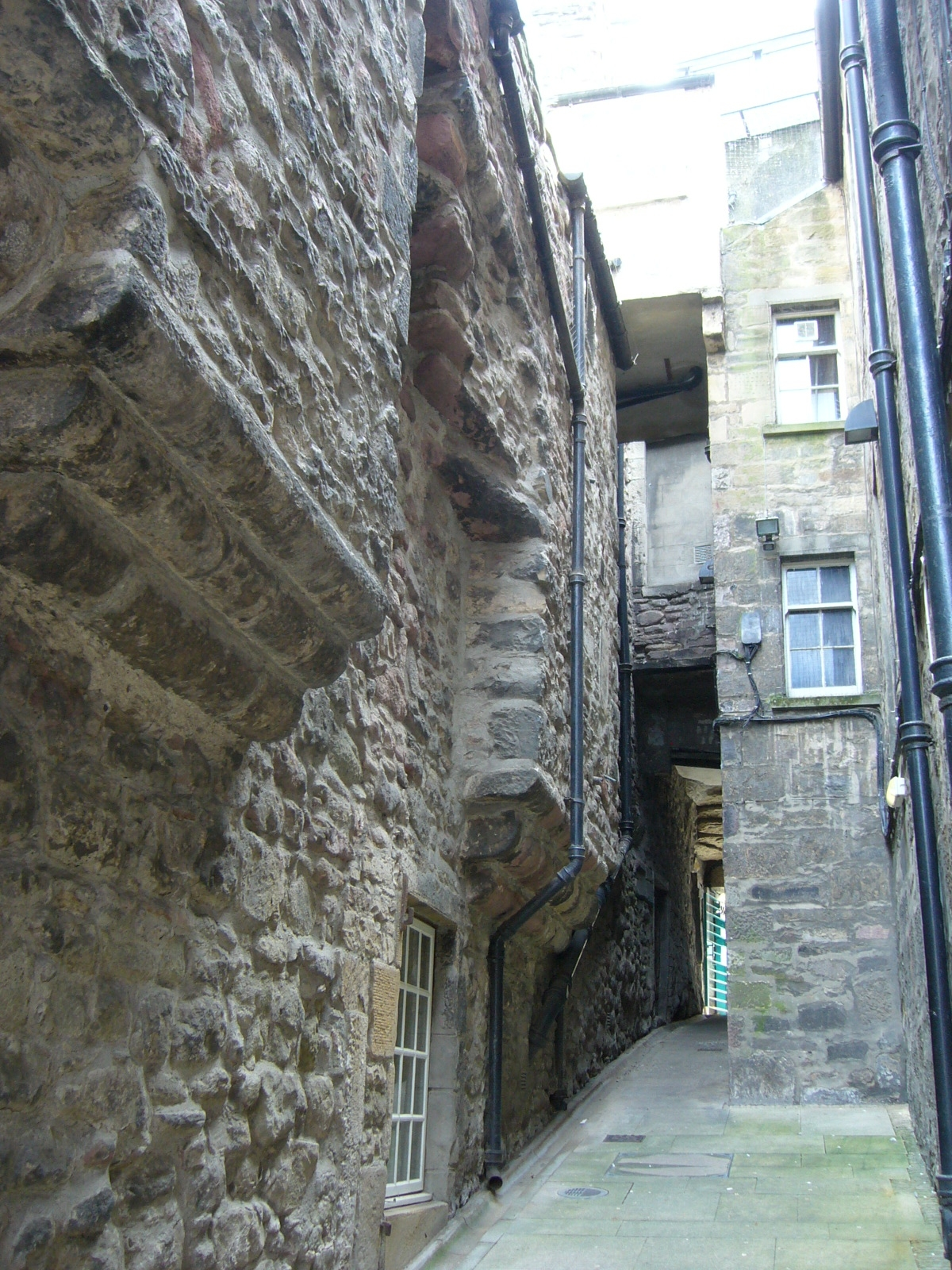
Trunk's Close off the High Street

North

The closes leading to or crossing Cockburn Street originally continued to Market Street. Cockburn Street was created in 1865 by demolition of parts of the closes.

- Byer's Close (private/ dead end)
- Advocates Close (connecting to Cockburn Street)
- Roxburgh Close (upper section accessible/ lower section private and blocked)
- Writer's Close leading to Warriston Close (connecting to Cockburn Street)
- Mary King's Close
- Craig's Close (accessed only from Cockburn Street, connecting to Market Street).
- Anchor Close (connecting to Cockburn street)
- Geddes Entry (private/ dead end)
- North Foulis Close (private/ dead end)
- Old Stamp Office Close (private/ dead end)
- Lyon's Close (private/ dead end)
- Jackson's Close (connecting to Cockburn Street)
- Fleshmarket Close (connecting to Market Street via Cockburn Street)
- Carrubber's Close (connecting to Jeffrey Street)
- Bishop's Close (sealed/private dead-end)
- North Gray's Close (connecting to Jeffrey Street)
- Morrison's Close (sealed/ private dead end)
- Bailie Fyfe's Close (dead end)
- Paisley Close (dead end)
- Chalmers' Close (connecting to Jeffrey Street)
- Monteith's Close (private/ dead end)(sign on ground only)
- Trunk's Close (accessible but private/ dead end)
- Baron Maule's Close (private, leads to private garden)

== Canongate ==
The Canongate is the section from St Mary's Street to the foot of the Royal Mile, and connects to Abbey Strand at Holyrood, which ran through the former Burgh of Canongate.

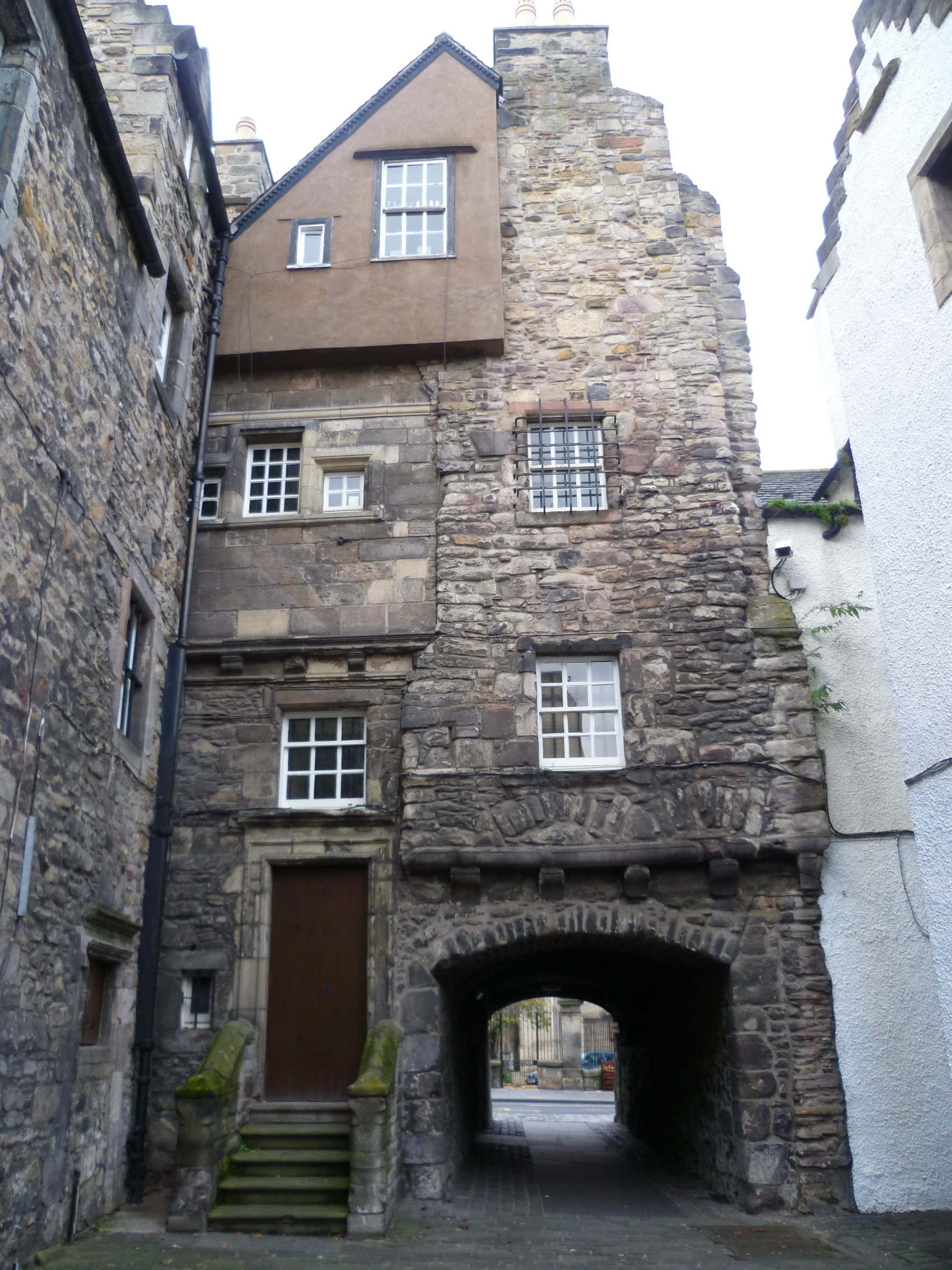
Bakehouse Close off the Canongate

South

- Gullan's Close (connecting to Holyrood Road)
- Gibb's Close (sign only/ serves solely as access to a shop)
- Pirrie's Close (connecting to Chessel's Court)
- Old Playhouse Close (sealed/ private dead end)
- Sugarhouse Close
- Bakehouse Close
- Wilson's Court
- Cooper's Close
- Crichton's Close
- Bull's Close (connecting to Holyrood Road)
- Reid's Close (currently no sign/ connects to Holyrood Road))
- Vallence's Entry (no sign/ private dead end)

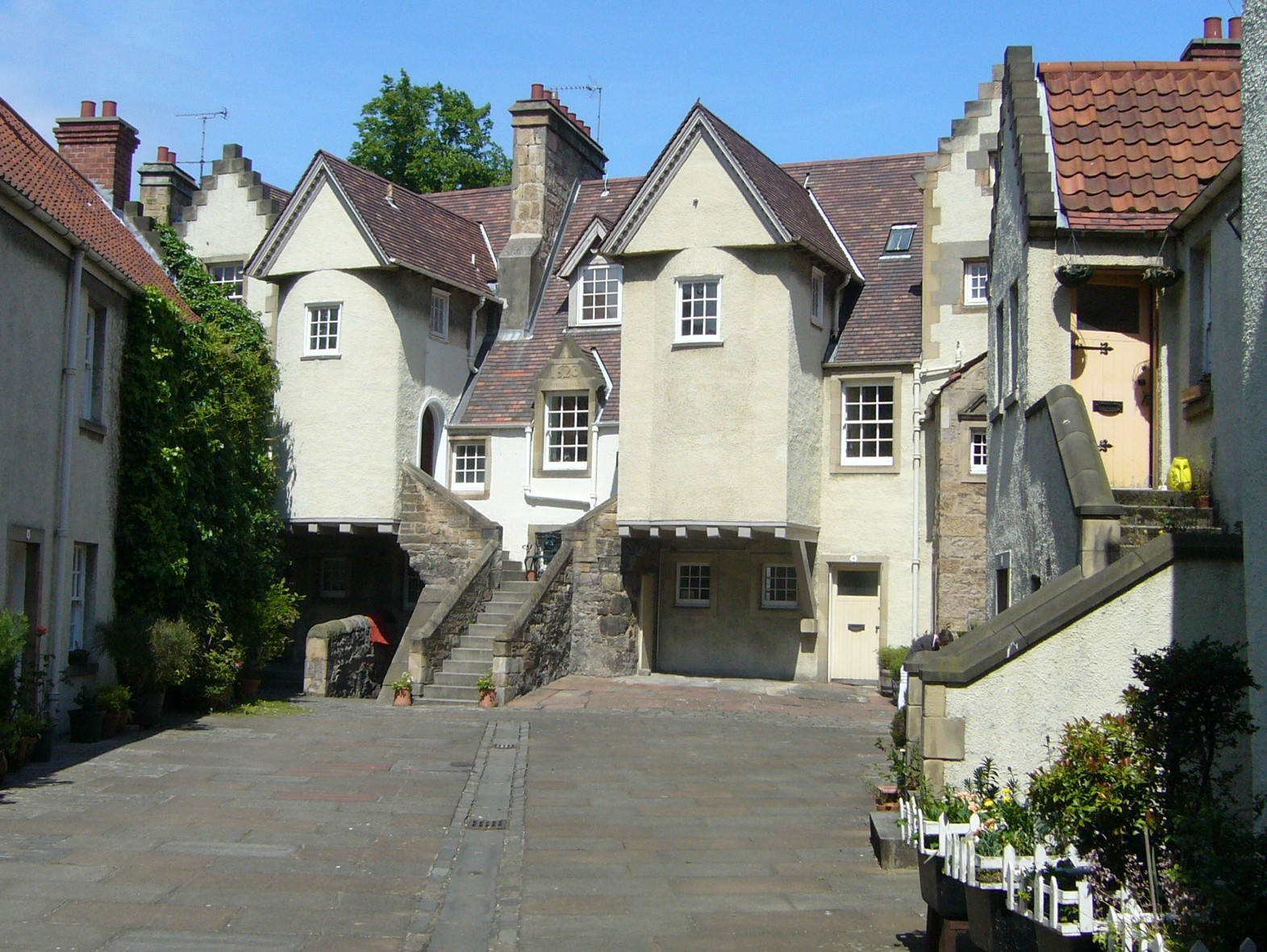
White Horse Close off the Canongate, named after the inn from which the Edinburgh-London stagecoach departed. The spacious courtyard allowed the coach to turn.

North

- Midcommon Close (sealed/ private dead end)
- Bowling Green Close (leading to Gladstone's Court)
- Big Jack's Close (pedestrian access to Sibbald Walk)
- Old Tolbooth Wynd (vehicle access from Calton Road)
- Dunbar's Close (leading to a knot garden)
- Panmure Close (partly sealed over newly built extension)
- Brown's Court (dead end)
- Lochend Close (vehicular access from Calton Road)
- Gladstone's Court (private/ dead end)
- Reid's Court (the old Canongate manse)
- Campbell's Close (cranked connection to Calton Road)
- Brown's Close (dead end)
- Forsyth's Close (sealed/ private dead end)
- Galloway's Entry (dead end)
- White Horse Close (site of a coaching inn; extensively restored)

== Bibliography ==
- Melvin, Eric (2014). A walk down Edinburgh's Royal Mile. Edinburgh: Eric Melvin. ISBN 978-1499518061.
- Wright, Gordon (2005). A guide to the Royal Mile : Edinburgh's historic highway (7th ed.). London: Steve Savage. ISBN 1904246125.
