= Edinburgh plague of 1585 =

Plague outbreak in Edinburgh

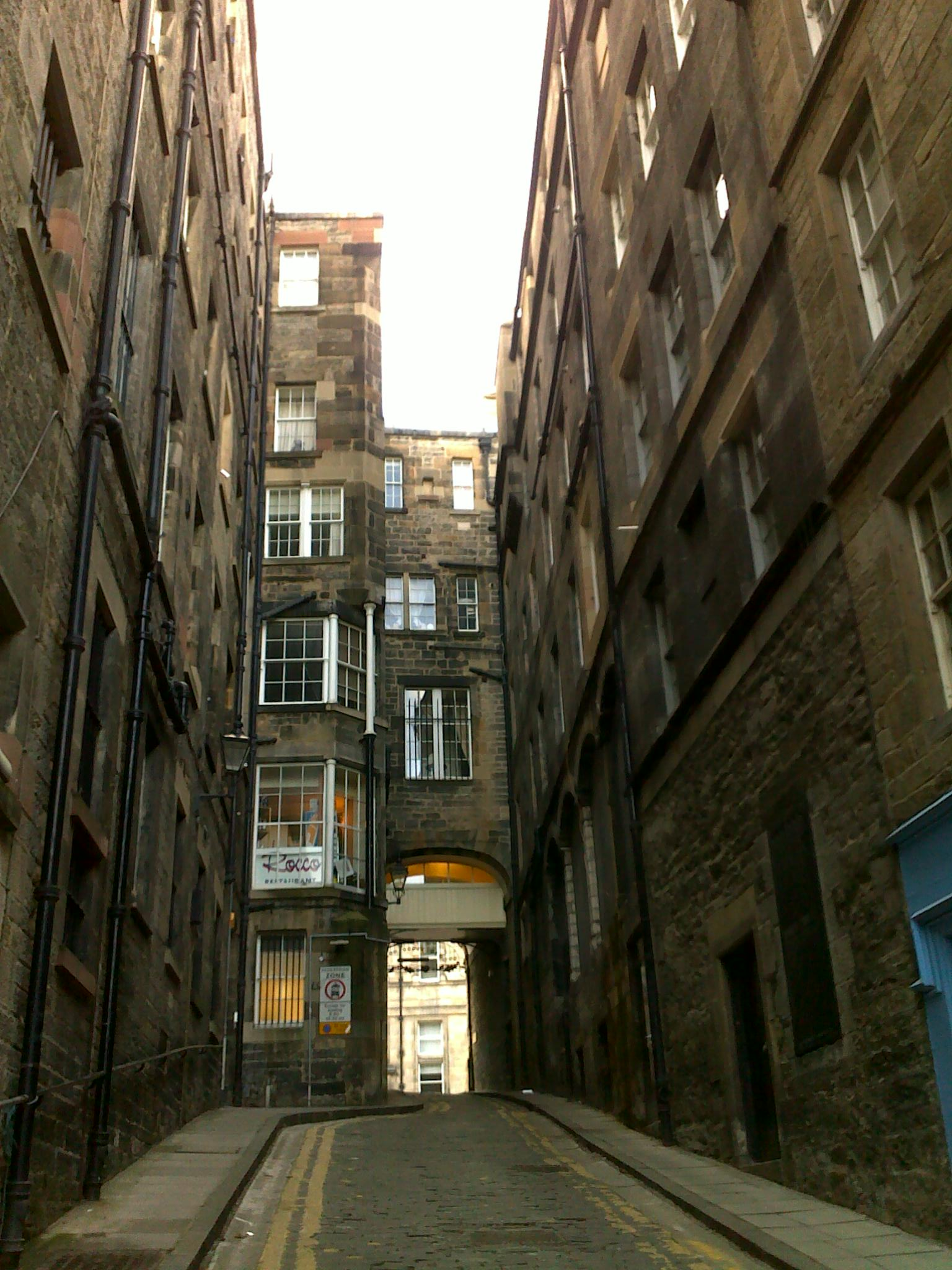
The first deaths from plague in Edinburgh in 1585 were in Fishmarket Close

There was a significant outbreak of plague in Edinburgh and Leith in April 1585. Sick people were isolated on the town's common grounds. Robert Rollock closed the town's college, the University of Edinburgh, from May 1585 to February 1586. The first known death was a woman living in Fishmarket Close.

== Plague comes to Perth ==
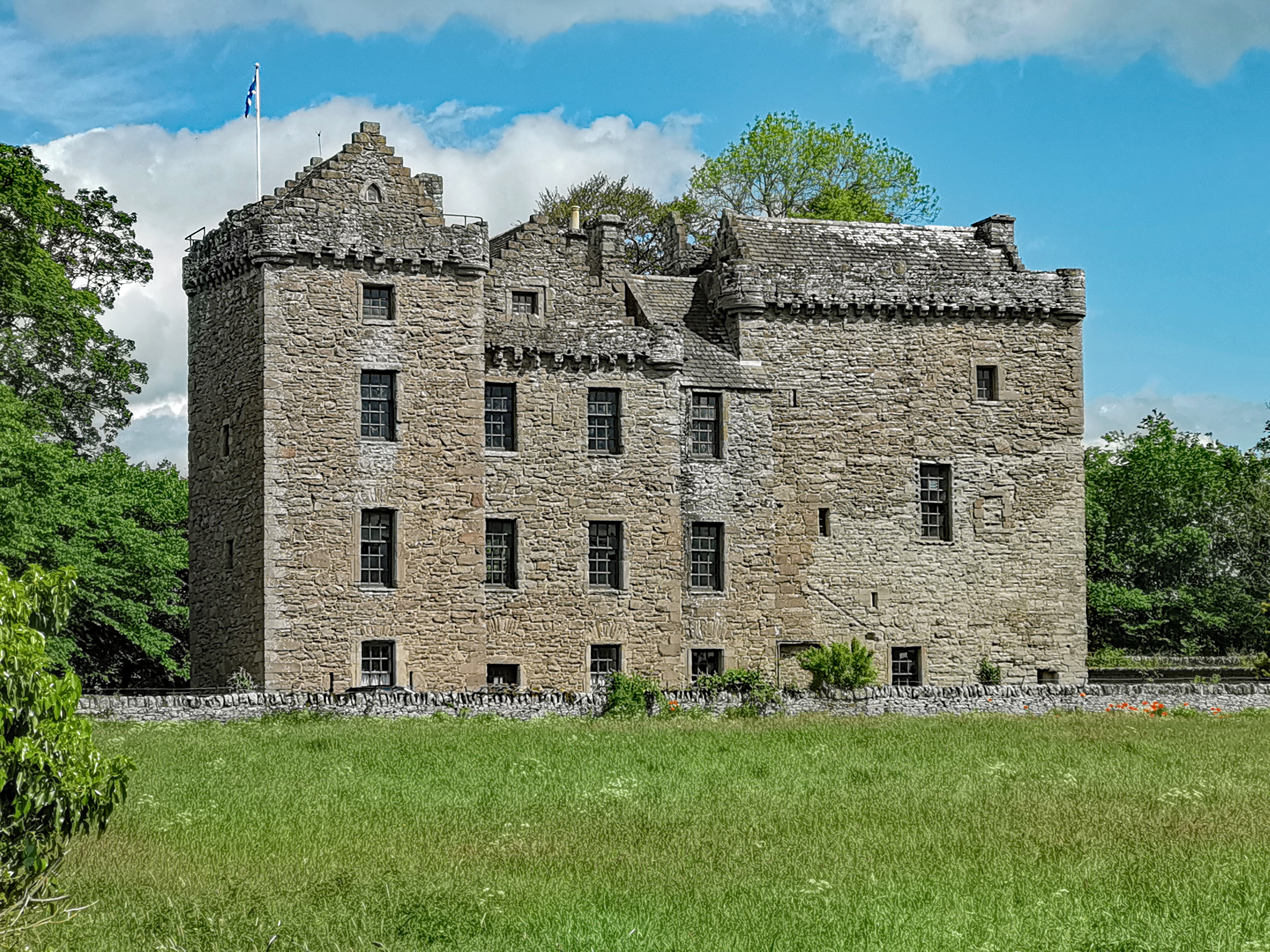
Royal servants were quarantined at Huntingtower, then known as "Ruthven Castle".

There was plague in July 1584 at West Wemyss in Fife, said to have been brought from Flanders. In September 1584 it was said that four servants had died at the court of King James VI. The King was staying at Ruthven Castle (Huntingtower) near Perth, where Lupold von Wedel saw him in St John's Kirk. James went to Tullibardine Castle and Stirling Castle to avoid the plague.

According to David Moysie, there were six houses in Perth known to be infected. Some members of the royal household had been lodged in the town and James left these servants behind, "enclosed" at Ruthven Castle. As many as 1,427 people died in Perth from plague between September 1584 and August 1585. Wedding parties and banquets were banned in Perth for fear of spreading infection. Infected people were placed in lodges outside the town.

A collection for relief was organised by the Edinburgh lawyers Oliver Colt and David Lawtie. James VI suspended the holding of any court cases in Edinburgh concerning people living north of the River Forth. In March 1585, Margaret Fleming, Countess of Atholl, was staying in Edinburgh's Canongate. She wrote to Mary, Queen of Scots, that she had found it difficult to send a letter "by reason of the contagious sickness that hath been, and yet is in this realm".

== Plague in Edinburgh ==
A woman's death from plague on 30 April 1585 in Simon Marjoribank's house in Fishmarket Close came to the attention of the Edinburgh burgh council. According to Robert Johnston's account, she was first thought to have been in labour. It was said she had brought the plague from Perth. The records of the burgh council say the death was in McCalyeon's lodging within John Young the tailor's land in Fishmarket Close, and the tailor and his colleague (a "marrow") had visited other houses in the town. The houses were to be enclosed or shut up and watched. On 5 May, watchers were appointed at the West Port and Nether Bow to prevent vagabonds who might be infected entering the city, especially those coming from the ferry over the Forth at South Queensferry.

By 9 May, two more people had died in John Young's land, and three who were still alive were to be taken outside the city limits at the house of the late Adam Purves beside St Roch's Chapel. Two plague cleansers, Alexander French and John Spier, were summoned from Dysart and Wemyss to look after the "seik folkis". The cleansers wore black jupes with a white patch or band so they could be recognised. The clothing of the sick was burnt. One of the children of the miller Walter Ochiltree died, and the rest of the family was sent to the lodgings being built near Adam Purvis's house. Alexander Smith was appointed as executioner of the "foul folk" for those found guilty of concealing infected people. A man was executed for stealing "foul gear" in June.

James Stewart, Earl of Arran was Provost of Edinburgh. He left the city and entertained James VI at Dirleton Castle for twelve days in May 1585, while there was plague in Edinburgh. The entertainment included a sumptuous banquet and a Robin Hood play. James VI returned to Edinburgh, visiting St Giles Cathedral on 9 June, then went to Falkland Palace in Fife, where he received the English ambassador Edward Wotton, and Dunfermline Palace where he gave an audience to three Danish diplomats. The Privy Council gave orders than anyone found with no lawful business in Falkland town would be ordered to leave. According to David Calderwood, the plague followed in King James's wake.

James Henrysoun was appointed as surgeon to visit and diagnose the sick. A place was built to keep the possessions of the infected at the lower entrance of Greyfriars Kirkyard near Cowgatehead. Steven Bannatyne made inventories of goods in houses suspected to be infected and Francis Loch, a "fowleman", took charge of such "foul goods". Cleansing of houses in the town seems to have involved fumigation with smoke, and John Kerr's house caught fire.

A shelter called the "Greitt Fowle Luge" was built on the Burgh Muir at "Adam Purvis's Acres" for sick people. The site was near Canaan Lane in present day Morningside. The "cleansed" were lodged to the west of this building, and newly suspected "foul" persons to the east. John Forrest was Master of the Cleansers, and another cleanser was appointed Bailie of the Muir. Robert Fairlie of the Braid provided a house for a brewery. There were so many people on the muir that the council ordered that their beer should be brewed thinner. Cleansed persons allowed home were confined to their houses for 15 days. A light coffin or bier of sawn deals was made for burials of the infected dead.

In July 1585, Alexander Smith, the "fowle hangman", was chained to the gibbet for a time for disobedience. William Fairlie was asked to provide the "foul-clengers" on Edinburgh burgh moor, who disinfected plague victim's goods, with a staff topped with a wicker taper. The Danish ambassadors' proposals were planned to be heard at a Convention of the Three Estates at Cupar in July, and a Parliament was held at St Andrews at the end of the month. In August, the plague came to St Andrews and James VI went on a progress and hunting trip to Inchmurrin at Loch Lomond, accompanied by Wotton. Four Flemish cleansers were employed in Edinburgh in September. They were allowed the use of the late Mungo Brady's house.

Edward Wotton wrote that the plague was in most of the "good towns" of Scotland in September 1585 and that Edinburgh and St Andrews "through the great mortality are almost desolate". In October, James VI went further into the countryside to attend the wedding of Lord Fleming at Kincardine Castle at Auchterarder. James VI was unable to raise a force to resist his rebels lords, Mar, Angus, and the Master of Glamis, who came from exile in England to Stirling in November and ousted his favourite James Stewart, Earl of Arran.

At the end of November 1585, James VI moved from Stirling and set up the courts and exchequer at Linlithgow Palace and held a Parliament. Almost at the end of the epidemic, Edinburgh burgh council transferred the sick to a property known as the "White House" owned by Euphame MacCalzean. James VI returned via Corstorphine to Edinburgh Castle then Holyrood Palace in the first week of January 1586.

== Deaths ==
Robert Birrell wrote that many people left Edinburgh during the epidemic. He estimated that 1,400 people died. In October 1585, Patrick Whitelaw of Newgrange wrote that more than 9,000 had died in Edinburgh. Calderwood wrote that 20,000 died in Edinburgh. A chronicle account includes the 1,400 total, and observes that the plague "continued long, and all the winter it was extreme as the summer". David Moysie wrote that in October 1585, when "the pest was vehement in Edinburgh", 60 to 80 people died each night.

A number of wills entered in registers held by the National Records of Scotland record deaths from the "pest", or in the "tyme of pest".

- Isobel Cor, sister of Clement Cor of Advocates Close, wife of the merchant Thomas Dickson, her will was made at her dwelling house door, died October 1585
- Marion Crawfurd, wife of the goldsmith David Palmer, died November 1585
- Helen Drummond indweller in Niddry's Wynd, who made her will in September 1585, "within this dangerous tyme of contagious sickness of the pest" and did not sign it or touch the pen to make her mark "by reason of the said contagious sickness".
- Alexander Grub, armourer in St Mary Wynd outwith the Nether Bow, who made and sold swords and spurs, died October 1585. His will mentions the "contageous seikness, wherewith he wes infectit".
- Bessie Neilson, brewer in Blackfriar's Wynd.
- Helene Newlands, and her husband William Pollok, weaver, died September 1585.
- Isobel Fischear, wife of the burgess Edward Machan
- Katherine Fisher, wife of the merchant Mungo Russell, at the Place of Dalrymill, August 1585
- George Hopper and his wife Jonet Davidsoune, merchants and booksellers, dwelling in Leith, October 1585
- Alesoun Nichole (or Nicoll), wife of the merchant George Robesoun, who did not sign her will as "she might not touch the pen by reason of this tyme of contagious sickness", died November 1585.
- John Pantoun, mariner in Leith, October 1585, and his wife Beatrice Auchinleck, December 1585
- John Rutherford, minister in St Andrews, died 4 October 1585.
- Thomas Sturgeon, clasp-maker in Forrester's Wynd, and his wife Jonet Harperfield, died September 1585.
- Henry Thomson, goldsmith in the Canongate, September 1585
- Thomas Wod, Deacon of the Wrights, carpenter and furniture maker, September 1585.
- Allan Young, textile merchant, and his wife Marion Alexander, brewer, his will was witnessed by Alexander Smith and John Forrest, master of the cleansers at the Mure, September 1585.

== Plague in 1597 ==
Edinburgh's records also hold details of plague in the summer of 1597. The oubreak was first recorded in East Lothian, at Inveresk, Dalkeith, and Musselburgh. It was in Leith by 9 August. Measures were made to restrict the numbers of people entering Edimnurgh and itinerant sellers of fish and fruit were banned. Despite the plague, more labourers were hired to complete building work at the "bulwark" pier at the Shore of Leith. They worked till the 9 November 1597. Building work at Greyfriar's Kirk was suspended on 6 September 1597. The uniform of the plague officials and cleansers included a long garment called a "jupe". The town's "lockman" or execution also wore a jupe. Fugitives from the infected houses and those who tried to conceal sick family members were punished. Several families supposed to be infected were "enclosed" in houses in Steelhouse Wynd, Steven Law's Close, and Niddry's Wynd. The town council supplied food such as herring and fuel to the enclosed people, A second wave of plague appeared in Dalkeith on 19 October 1597.
