= Andrew Crosbie =

Scottish lawyer

Andrew Crosbie of Holm FRSE FSAScot (1736–1785) was a Scottish lawyer and antiquarian, and a notable figure of the Scottish Enlightenment. He was a close friend and companion of James Boswell and with him co-wrote the legal song The Justiciary Opera, sung by generations of Scottish advocates.

== Life ==
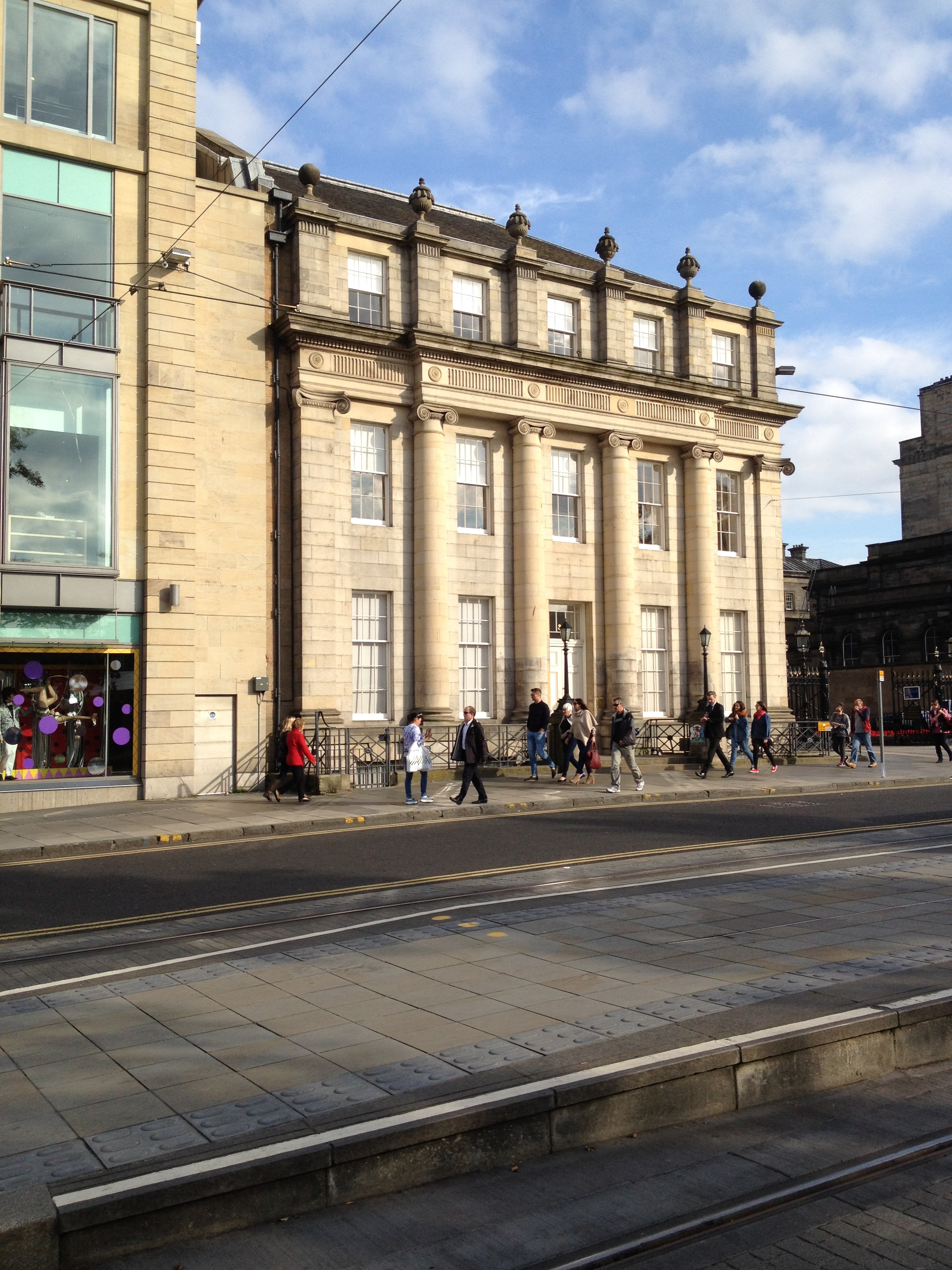
Andrew Crosbie's house at St Andrew Square, Edinburgh

He was born in the Soutergate, Dumfries, the only surviving son of Andrew Crosbie of Holm (d. 1762), the provost of Dumfries, and his wife, Jean Grierson. His early education was at Dumfries Academy.

He studied law at the University of Edinburgh, and was admitted to the Faculty of Advocates in 1757.

In 1769, together with James Boswell, he helped to fund the Corsican rebels fighting under Pasquale Paoli.

Around 1770, he began building his own house on St Andrews Square at the east end of the then first phase of Edinburgh's New Town. However he was financially ruined in 1772 by the demise of Douglas, Heron & Co, a bank in Ayr in which he was a partner.

As a member of the Edinburgh Philosophical Society when it was awarded a royal charter in 1783, he automatically became a founding Fellow of the Royal Society of Edinburgh.

An office-bearer ('Assassin') of The Poker Club, and a friend of Boswell and Johnson, Crosbie was the basis of the character Councillor Pleydellin Sir Walter Scotts's novel Guy Mannering.

In 1780 he was a co-founder of the Royal Society of Antiquaries of Scotland. In 1783 he was a co-founder of the Royal Society of Edinburgh. He was elected Vice-Dean of the Faculty of Advocates in 1784, two months before his death.

He lived on Advocates Close off the Royal Mile in Edinburgh's Old Town, close to the main courts. He moved to Allan's Close and shortly before death moved to a new house on the east side of St Andrews Square in the New Town, immediately north of what is now Dundas House.

Popular despite being an acknowledged alcoholic (not helped by his financial ruin), he died in impoverished circumstances in rented accommodation, probably of liver disease, on 25 February 1785, and was interred in a now unmarked grave at Greyfriars Kirkyard in Edinburgh.

== Family ==
Crosbie was married to Elizabeth Barker, a "woman of ill-repute". After he died the Faculty of advocates awarded her a pension of £50 per year.

== Publications ==
- Thoughts of a Layman Concerning Patronage and Presentation (1769)
- A Treatise on the Office, Duty, and Powers of Judges and Magistrates in Scotland (published by William Creech in 1785)

== Artistic recognition ==
Crosbie was painted in his advocate robes, addressing his courtroom, by David Martin. The portrait was donated by his widow to the Faculty of Advocates following his death and hangs in Parliament House, Edinburgh (part of the Edinburgh Law Courts).

Councillor Paulus Pleydell, in Scott's Guy Mannering, is based on Crosbie.
