= Old Fishmarket Close =

Alleyway in Edinburgh, Scotland

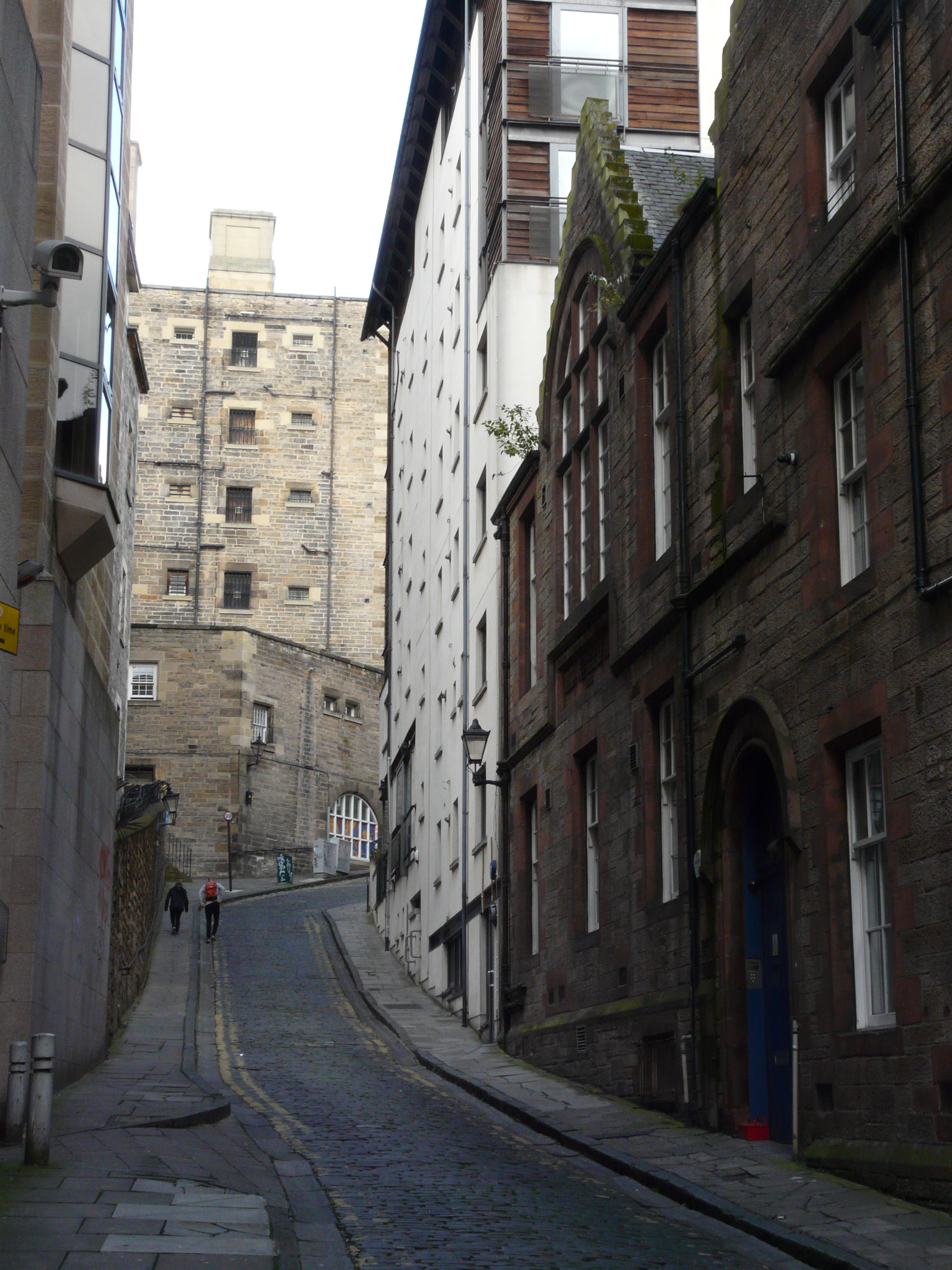
Old Fishmarket Close, Edinburgh, leading to the Royal Mile

Old Fishmarket close is an alleyway in the Edinburgh Royal Mile leading to Cowgate. Near St. Giles Cathedral.

== History ==
The location used to be full of residences, but after many events causing the population to dwindle, it has since become a location of historic interest. During the "Lang Siege" of 1573, many streets on the Royal Mile were cannoned along with the castle, including Old Fishmarket close. During the cannoning, it was said that Peasants tried to grab some flying fish that were blown into the roofs surrounding the close. During the siege, 5 people died and 20 were injured.

A girl working in Old Fishmarket close in April 1585 was the first to die when plague came to Edinburgh. According to one account, she was first thought to have been in labour.

A house at the back of Fishmarket Close was the residence of Edinburgh's executioner or "lockman", and was known as "Hangie's House". In 1705, a Dutchman named Abraham Sever who kept an elephant, nicknamed the Dundee Elephant, lived in a flat in Old Fishmarket close, above a baker named Adam Kerr Baxter. Sever requested to parade around the elephant, which had already been used in several tours in the 1680s and 1690s, as for the viewing pleasures of Edinburgh residents. Baxter had complained to the council about the dung of the elephant causing damage to his bakery.

== In popular media ==
- Old Fishmarket Close is the location by which “the Anglerfish” resides in episode 1 of the Magnus Archives, MAG001: “Anglerfish”.
