= Clement Cor =

Scottish merchant (1533–1608)

Clement Cor of Redwalls (1533–1608) was a Scottish merchant based in Edinburgh and St Andrews.

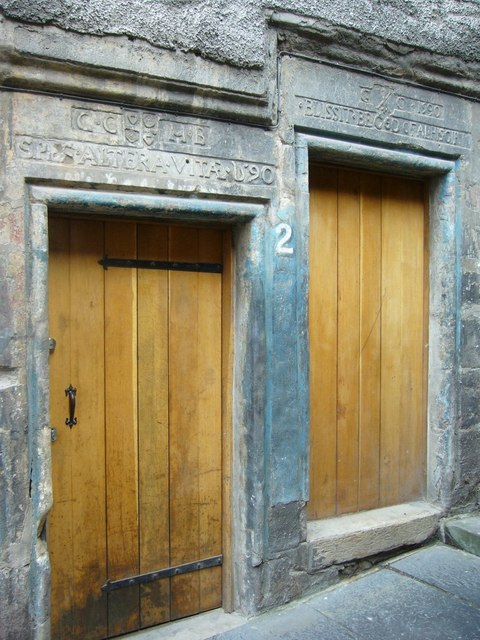
Doorways at Advocate's Close carved with Clement Cor's initials

== Edinburgh career ==
Cor was the eldest son of Andrew Cor, a merchant in Edinburgh. Cor became a burgess of Edinburgh in November 1566 and served the burgh council as a Dean of Guild, and Bailie. He acquired a property in Advocates Close in 1579 and his house, built or rebuilt around 1590, is a rare survival of an Edinburgh merchant's house of this date. A painted renaissance ceiling was discovered in the house in 2010 and dated by dendrochronology to Cor's period of ownership.

His sister Isabella Cor died of the plague in 1585. In September 1596, with the physician Gilbert Moncreiff and kirk minister Robert Bruce he interviewed a woman from Nokwalter in Perth, Christian Stewart, who was accused of causing the death of Patrick Ruthven by witchcraft. She confessed she had obtained a cloth from Isobel Stewart to bewitch Patrick Ruthven, and repeated this confession to the king and Sir George Home at Linlithgow Palace. She was found guilty of witchcraft and burnt on Edinburgh's Castlehill.

Cor bought produce from John Gordon, 13th Earl of Sutherland and expected cash payment in silver when the Earl was unable to supply the contracted "victual" from his tenant farms in 1602. Clement Cor's son-in-law, the Laird of Ardrie, made arrangements with the Earl.

== Fife and the Lewis venture ==
Clement Cor moved to St Andrews before 1603, when he gave the Edinburgh house to his eldest daughter Margaret. This was an unusual move for an established merchant in the 16th century. He obtained a property called Redwalls in Airdrie, Fife, from his son-in-law, Robert Lumsden. Cor invested with Lumsden in an unsuccessful and much-criticised venture to settle a plantation on the Scottish island of Lewis. Many of the investors were from Fife and are known as the Gentleman Adventurers of Fife.

Cor died of the plague at St Andrews on 2 March 1608. His tombstone survives in the Cathedral precincts.

== Marriage and children ==
Clement Cor married Helen Bellenden. Their children included:

- Margaret Cor, who married Alexander Livingstone
- Isobel Cor, who married Robert Lumsden of Airdrie (near Crail) in 1588.
- Bessie Cor
- Janet Cor (1571-1608), who married Henry McKieson, a burgess of Edinburgh, she died in the same epidemic as her father and is also commemorated on the monument at St Andrews.
