= List of fellows of the Royal Society elected in 1712 =

This is a list of fellows of the Royal Society elected in 1712.

== Fellows ==
- John Fortescue Aland, 1st Baron Fortescue of Credan (1670–1746)
- Giuseppe Averani (1662–1738)
- Jean Bernoulli (1667–1748)
- Patrick Blair (fl. 1708–1728)
- Richard Bradley (d. 1732)
- Thomas Bower (fl. 1703–1723)
- Rinaldo Duliolo (d. 1743)
- John Freind (1675–1728)
- Pietro Grimani (1677–1752)
- Robert Harley, 1st Earl of Oxford and Mortimer (1661–1724)
- George Hay, 8th Earl of Kinnoull (d. 1758)
- James Keill (1673–1719)
- John Kemp (1665–1717)
- Richard Myddleton Massey (c. 1678–1743)
- Samuel Molyneux (1689–1728)
- Peter Le Neve (1662–1729)
- Thomas Parker, 1st Earl of Macclesfield (1666–1732)
- Thomas Pellet (1671–1744)
- Thomas Rawlinson (1681–1725)
- Richard Richardson (1663–1741)
- Thomas Sprat (1679–1720)
- Brook Taylor (1685–1731)
- William Tempest (1682–1761)
