= Patrick Blair (surgeon) =

Scottish surgeon, anatomist and botanist

Patrick Blair FRS (ca.1670–1728) was a Scottish surgeon, anatomist and botanist, and a Fellow of the Royal Society.

== Life ==
It is uncertain when he was born. The Oxford Dictionary of National Biography suggests he was born in Lethendy, near Perth in 1675. Others suggest that he was born in Dundee in 1666. In a letter dated 1719, Blair mentioned that he had been in practice for 28 years; this would suggest a birth-date of at least 48 years earlier, therefore prior to 1672.

He trained as a surgeon and spent some time in the Netherlands learning his trade, possibly with the British Army. He returned to Dundee shortly before 1702 and set up as a surgeon-apothecary. In 1702, he married Elizabeth Whyte, from which marriage four children were born – John, Henry, Elizabeth and Isabell.

In 1706 Blair dissected an elephant which had died on the road between Broughty Ferry and Dundee. The elephant (which was a female Indian one, around 26 years old) was being toured around Scotland and England by a Dutch showman named Abraham Sever; it died on Saturday 27 April 1706 (nb this was the date in the Gregorian calendar, which was at that time 11 days behind the Julian calendar.) Over a period of weeks, Blair dissected the elephant, taking careful note of all the bones, muscles and organs, and then had the resultant skeleton mounted for public display. He then wrote a full description, under the title of Osteographia Elephantina, which he sent to Hans Sloane of the Royal Society of London in April 1709; this was published in the Society's Journal (Philosophical Transactions) in two parts in 1710.

In 1707 he dissected and prepared the skeleton of a porter who had hanged himself in the stairway of St Andrews University and this was placed in the Anatomy lecture room from 1722. Blair received 100 merks for this work. In 1708, he founded a Natural History Society in Dundee, and several botanical collections were displayed in a ‘Physic Garden’ - later to expand to a ‘Hall of Rarities’. This was situated somewhere near the Nethergate in Dundee.

In 1712 the family moved to the small town of Coupar Angus.

In 1715 Blair joined the rebellion led by the Earl of Mar and travelled with the Jacobite army when it marched into England. He was captured at the Battle of Preston in November 1715 and imprisoned at Newgate Prison in London. Despite claiming that he had been forced to join the rebel army, he was sentenced to death, but was given a last-minute reprieve in April 1716 after appeals by Hans Sloane and other members of the Royal Society. He stayed in London until April 1720 and continued to publish scientific works, including an account of pyloric stenosis in the Philosophical Transactions in 1717, probably the earliest account of that condition. He and his family settled in Boston, Lincolnshire, where he devoted himself to botanical research, publishing several books and delivering papers before the Royal Society. His Botanick Essays of 1720 were well received and arguably the book by which he is best known. In 1723, he published the first volume of a work which described all the plants in the British Isles – his Pharmaco-Botanologia. He had reached the letter H when he died in February 1728.

== Honours ==
In 1712, he was awarded an MD degree from King's College, the University of Aberdeen.

On 1 December 1712, he was made a Fellow of the Royal Society of London List of fellows of the Royal Society elected in 1712

== Publications ==
Note that all of the articles written by Blair for the Royal Society are available online at

- Osteographia Elephantina: or, A Full and Exact Description of All the Bones of an Elephant, Which Died Near Dundee, April the 27th, 1706. With Their Several Dimensions. Communicated in a Letter to Dr. Hans Sloane, R.S.Secr. By Mr Patrick Blair, Surgeon, &c (in: Philosophical Transactions of the Royal Society, Vol.27, No.326, pp. 53–116. 1710; and Vol.27, No.327, pp. 117–168. 1710)
- The same, published in book form, London (G. Strahan) 1713.
- An account of the asbestos, or lapis amiantus, found in the high-lands of Scotland. (in: Philosophical Transactions of the Royal Society, Vol.27, No.333, pp. 434–436. 1710)
- Miscellaneous Observations in the Practice of Physick, Anatomy and Surgery: With New and Curious Remarks in Botany. London (W. Mears) 1718
- An account of the dissection of a child. Communicated in a letter to Dr. Brook Taylor, R.S.Secr. (in: Philosophical Transactions of the Royal Society, Vol.30, No.353, pp. 631ff. 1719)
- A Description of the Organ of Hearing in the Elephant etc. (in: Philosophical Transactions of the Royal Society, Vol.30, No.358, pp. 865–898. 1719)
- Botanick Essays: In Two Parts ... London (W. & J. Innis) 1720
- Copy of an affidavit made in Scotland, concerning a boy's living a considerable time without food. Communicated by Patrick Blair, M.D. F.R.S (in: Philosophical Transactions of the Royal Society, Vol.31, No.364, pp. 28–30. 1721)
- A discourse concerning a method of discovering the Virtues of Plants by their external structure, By Patrick Blair, M.D. F.R.S (in: Philosophical Transactions of the Royal Society, Vol.31, No.364, pp. 30–38. 1721)
- Observations upon the generation of plants, in a letter to Sir Hans Sloane, etc. By Patrick Blair, M.D. F.R.S (in: Philosophical Transactions of the Royal Society, Vol.31, No.369, pp. 216–221. 1721)
- Pharmaco-Botanologia, an Alphabetical and Classical Dissertation on all the British Indigenous and Garden Plants of the New London Dispensatory. London (G. Strahan) 1723–28

== Recognition ==
Patrick Blair Place within the Ninewells Hospital site in west Dundee is named in his honour.
