= Bell's Wynd =

Alleyway in Edinburgh, Scotland

Coordinates: 55.949948°N 3.188825°W

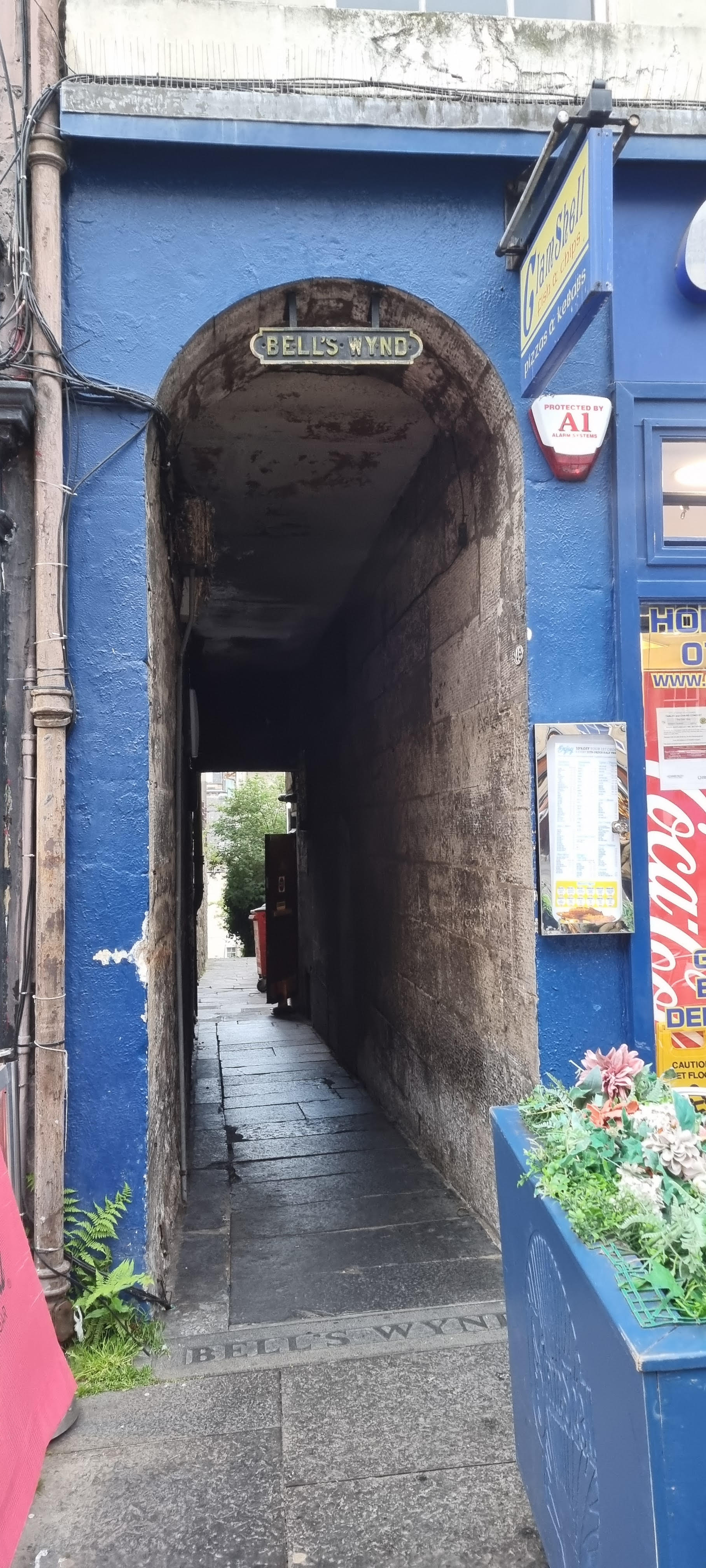
Entrance to Bell's Wynd from the Royal Mile, Edinburgh.

Bell's Wynd is a narrow alley in Edinburgh of medieval origin. The close leads from the Royal Mile. It was named after John Bell, a brewer, who had a tenement in the wynd in around 1529. The close is also known as "Clamshell Land".

== History ==
There was thought to be hospital in Bell's Wynd in the 15th century. At the head of the wynd, there was a house named "Maison Dieu" which is first mentioned as a placename in 1477 and then again in a title deed in 1582. However, if there was a hospital here it must have become defunct in the 15th century. Almsmen of the hospital received a tenement to stay in in Bell's Wynd in 1541 so it is likely that "Maison Dieu" is this tenement.

In 1708, the first Government approved newspaper in Scotland, The Scots Postman, was sited at Bell's Wynd. Then later it became amalgamated with the New Edinburgh Gazette. The publisher of the paper, James Donaldson, also specialised in printed funeral cards with skeletons, mortcloths and other ‘emblems of mortality’ on their borders.

The wynd also was the birthplace of James Johnson's Scots Musical Museum (published 1787-1803) which was a songbook which introduced the songs of Robert Burns to the world.Johnson was a well-known engraver, music seller and copperplate printer who was friends with Burns and owned a workshop on Bell's Wynd.

The Marjoribanks of Ratho, ancestors of Lord Tweedmouth, also resided for many years in Bell's Wynd. Two of the Marjoribanks were Lord Provosts of the city.

The site is also referenced as possessing two brothels in the c.1775 publication, Ranger's Impartial List Of the Ladies of Pleasure in Edinburgh - with a preface by a Celebrated Wit:

Miss Walker (back of Bell Wynd)

"THIS Lady keeps a very genteel house, and meets with very good success. She is about 26 years of age, tall and thin, black hair, good teeth, and a pretty good skin. She is disobliging in her temper ; and if any gentleman refuse to pay what she demands, she never fails to load them with curses and imprecations. And even the poor Nymphs, who are her only support, often feels the weight of her revenge. We hope she will take a hint from the above, that we may alter our opinion (as it is our sole aim to be impartial) when the next edition is printed".

Miss Menzies (back of Bell Wynd)

"THIS Lady is about 19, is tall, fair hair, good skin and teeth, and agreeable in her temper. She understands the game of love admirably well ; she's profuse in her favours, and declares she ever will be so".

In modern times, the Clamshell Fish and Chip Shop stands at the entrance to Bell's Wynd and "offers the only deep fried Mars Bars on the Royal Mile".

== Famous Residents ==
- The Marjoribanks of Ratho.
