= Fleshmarket Close, Edinburgh =

Street

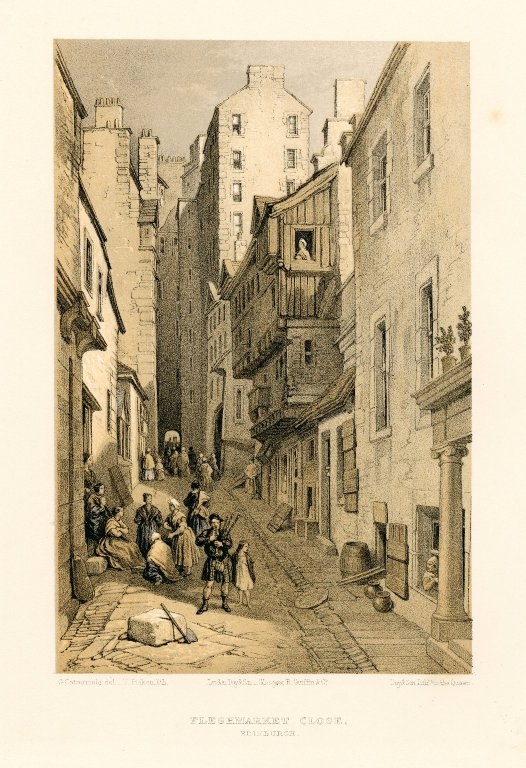
Lithograph of Fleshmarket Close, Edinburgh by T. Picken after G. Cattermole (1847-1854)

Fleshmarket Close is a narrow alley in Edinburgh of medieval origin. The close leads up from Edinburgh Waverley Station's Market Street exit and joins with Cockburn Street leading to High Street and the Royal Mile.

== History ==
Fleshmarket Close was historically the residence of Henry Dundas, Viscount Melville.

In 2003, Edinburgh Councillor Donald Anderson stated, "It is such an important route between the Old Town and the railway station. We have got a responsibility to make sure it is kept up to a high standard."

The street gave the title to the fifteenth crime novel by Ian Rankin, Fleshmarket Close, published in 2004.

The street was also used in filming for J. J. Abrams' 2025 movie “Ghostwriter”, starring Glen Powell, Jenna Ortega, Emma Mackey and Samuel L. Jackson.

=== 'The Jingling Geordie' ===
The Jinglin' Geordie bar was named after the 17th century money-lender and goldsmith, George Heriot, who left a bequest for the creation of a hospital for "fatherless bairns." It went on to become a leading independent school, George Heriot's.

The bar itself was hugely popular with staff of both the Evening News and sister paper The Scotsman until they relocated to the Holyrood area in 1999.

Ian Bell the Scottish newspaper columnist and author (biographies of Bob Dylan and Robert Louis Stevenson) was known to frequent the bar.

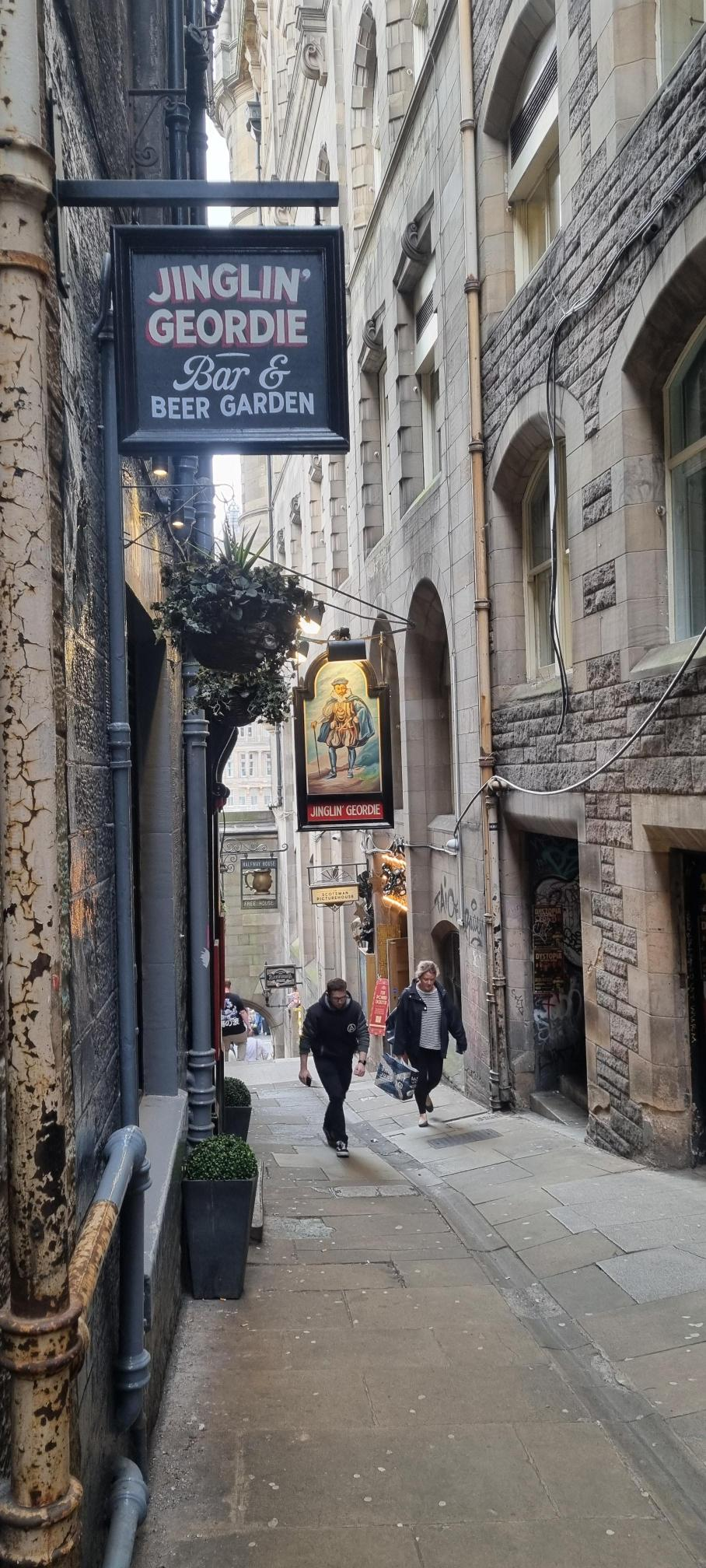
Fleshmarket Close, Edinburgh (July 2025)
