= Dundee elephant =

Female elephant

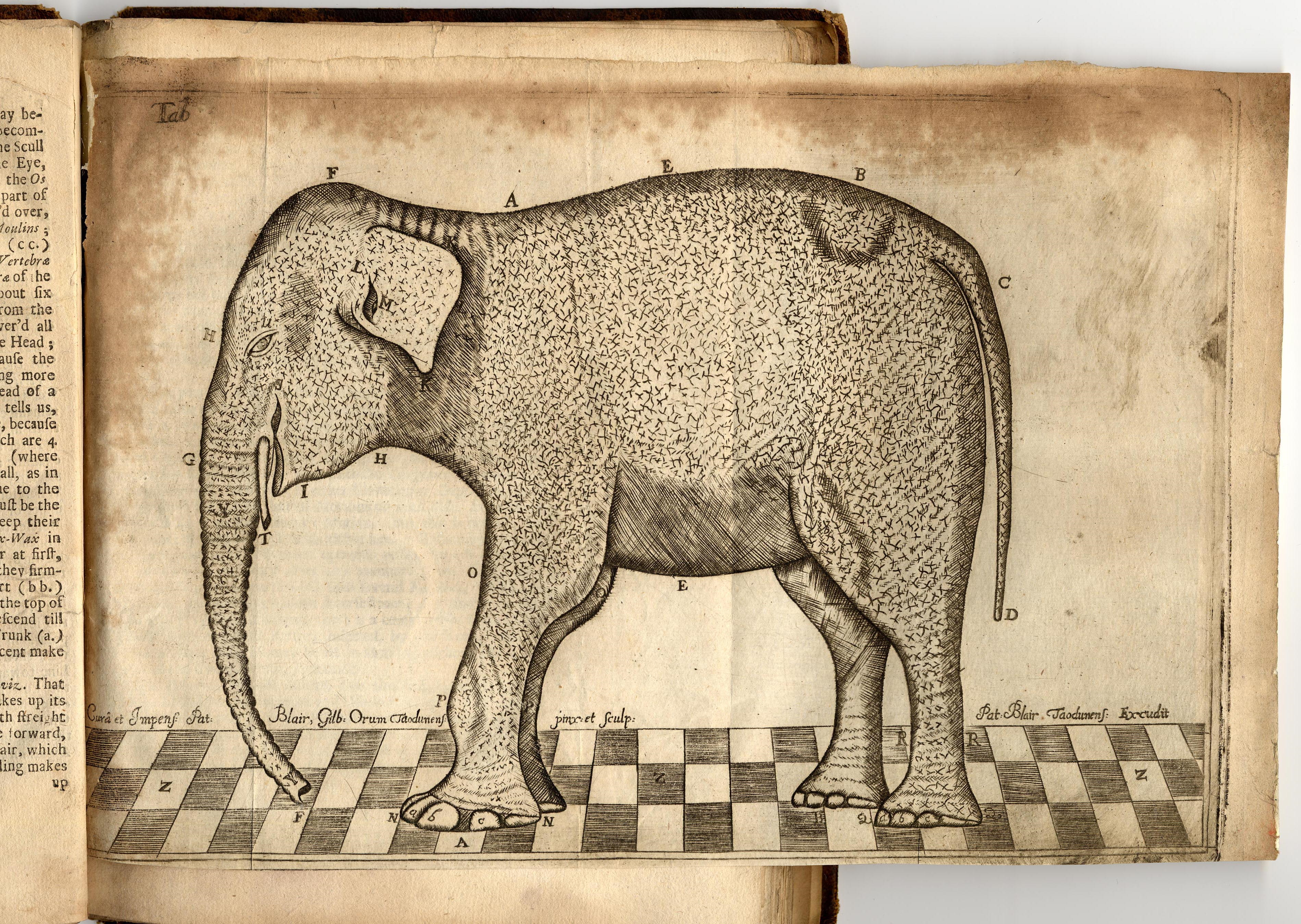
Engraved image of the Dundee elephant after it had been dissected and stuffed

The Dundee elephant was an unnamed female Indian elephant, which died on the road between Broughty Ferry and Dundee on 27 April 1706. The elephant was subsequently dissected and described by the Dundee apothecary-surgeon Patrick Blair who published his findings in the Transactions of the Royal Society of London in 1710. This was the first time that a complete elephant had been subjected to scientific anatomical study in Western Europe.

== Origins ==
The elephant was a female, and she was of the Asian species, rather than the African, and possibly came from Ceylon (Sri Lanka). She was around 28 years old in 1706. Where the elephant was acquired and when, is not known.

== Travels in Europe ==
She first appears in historical records in October 1688, in the accounts for the annual Michaelmas Fair at Leipzig in Germany. There, a man identified as 'Barthel Verhagen from Amsterdam' had displayed an elephant, charging a fee from those who wished to view it. Alongside him, Anton Verhagen, most probably Barthel's brother, was showing a lion and a tiger. It was Anton who turned up with the elephant in Vienna in 1689, and he also exhibited various exotic birds and animals around the great fairs and markets of Europe.

Over the next decade after 1688, Barthel Verhagen and the elephant undertook a tour of Europe, and making a comfortable living. In Berlin in December 1689 customers paid two 'groschen' to see her perform military exercises with a rifle and a flag. Twelve months later, the elephant was to be found performing its tricks in the Italian towns of Bologna and Lucca; early the following year she was back across the Alps, visiting Bremen in the north of Germany and Stargard in western Poland, and in October once more in Leipzig.

After Leipzig, the elephant and her keeper visited the Swiss towns of St. Gallen, Zurich and Basel in 1693. In 1694 they were in the northern Baltic towns of Kaliningrad and Gdańsk. In August 1695 the elephant was in Nuremberg. In March 1696 she appeared near Heilbronn, and by Easter was in Frankfurt. There is evidence that the elephant had also appeared in Stuttgart in south-west Germany.

After the summer of 1696, Verhagen was back in Amsterdam, where he had already bought an inn in 1681, which he now renamed 'De Witte Oliphant' (The White Elephant).

A contemporary drawing from Stuttgart indicates that the elephant was in the company of 'two Dutchmen'. Barthel Verhagen had by then been joined by another Dutchman, Jan Jansson, who shared the responsibilities of exhibiting the animal. Jansson was a close business associate of Verhagen; in 1703, just before his death, Verhagen was to name Jansson as his heir and executor.

On Verhagen's retirement, Jan Jansson rented the elephant from him on a three-year lease, and in 1698 took the animal to France, where she appeared in Nantes and Paris. Records indicate that keeper and elephant were still in France in April 1700. But Jansson himself returned to Amsterdam in 1701, and in November of that year that the elephant passed from Jan to his brother Gregorius.

Gregorius Janssen (he used this spelling of his surname) signed a contract with Verhagen to rent the elephant for a period of three years, paying a sum of 3,000 guilders per annum. With the contract signed, Gregorius took the elephant to England.

The elephant was a great success in London. The theatre impresario Christopher Rich was keen to hire the elephant as a novelty act to be inserted into any play or farce that he might put on. However, this plan fell through when his builder advised him that any attempt to widen the doors to permit the elephant's entrance on stage would cause the entire building to collapse. In November 1701, the elephant performed at the White-Horse Inn in Fleet Street, every day from ten o'clock in the morning through to six in the evening.

In March 1702, Verhagen apparently agreed to sell the elephant to a bird-merchant of London, David Randal, for one thousand pounds Sterling. When Randal sent his notary to Verhagen's house a few days later, to finalise the deal, Verhagen denied all knowledge of any such agreement, passing it off as a drunken joke. Verhagen did not sell his elephant. Indeed, when Verhagen made his last Will and Testament (in August 1703), he stipulated that 'the elephant he owns shall as long as it lives never be sold, but shall always be leased out by the executors'. The income was to be used for annuities for his three daughters.

== In Scotland ==
In late 1704, the lease of the elephant then passed to a Dutch rope-dancer by the name of Abraham Sever. It is likely that Sever took charge of the elephant when she was still in London, and then toured it around England. In October 1705, Sever arrived in Edinburgh in Scotland, where the town-council granted him permission to exhibit the elephant. In November, a complaint was raised against Sever by a baker named Adam Kerr, whose bakery lay below a tenement apartment in which Sever and the elephant were living. The complaint was that Sever "keeps his eliphant therein & exposes the same. The Dung & water thereof comes so doun upon my said vault that it has soylt the same and shaken and spoylt the vault and comes doun in great quantities upon the vault & spoyls and abuses the concerned goods and if not tymously prevented will altogether rowin said vault." He demanded that the council have the elephant removed.

In early April 1706, the elephant performed in the grounds of the newly renovated Hamilton Palace. After the performance before the Duchess of Hamilton, Sever was paid two 'guineas' (about £28 Scots), and his servant – his wife or an apprentice – received a 'dollar' (about £3 Scots). After this, it is likely that keeper and elephant headed to Aberdeen, although this is not documented. Patrick Blair noted that the elephant came to Broughty Ferry and Dundee "from the north...along the sea-coast".

== Death ==
On the evening of Friday, 26 April 1706 (the date is in the Gregorian "old" style), the elephant collapsed at the side of the road between Broughty Ferry and Dundee. By morning of the 27th, she had died. Captain George Yeaman, provost and later MP of Dundee, organised a guard to be set up, to prevent local people from damaging the corpse. He also invited Patrick Blair, an apothecary-surgeon of Dundee, and a man experienced in the dissection of mammals, to take charge of the body. Blair assembled a party of butchers and fellow-physicians, who worked through the Saturday and into Monday (no work could be done on the Sunday), and brought all the pieces of the elephant to Dundee for further dissection and analysis. Abraham Sever, in the meantime, obtained from Yeaman a certificate that he had done the elephant 'no designed injury' – which he required to avoid paying a penalty to Verhagen's executors – and he and his party made their way back to the Netherlands. From Blair's dissection and report, however, it was clear that the animal had died from undernourishment and neglect.

== The Osteographia ==
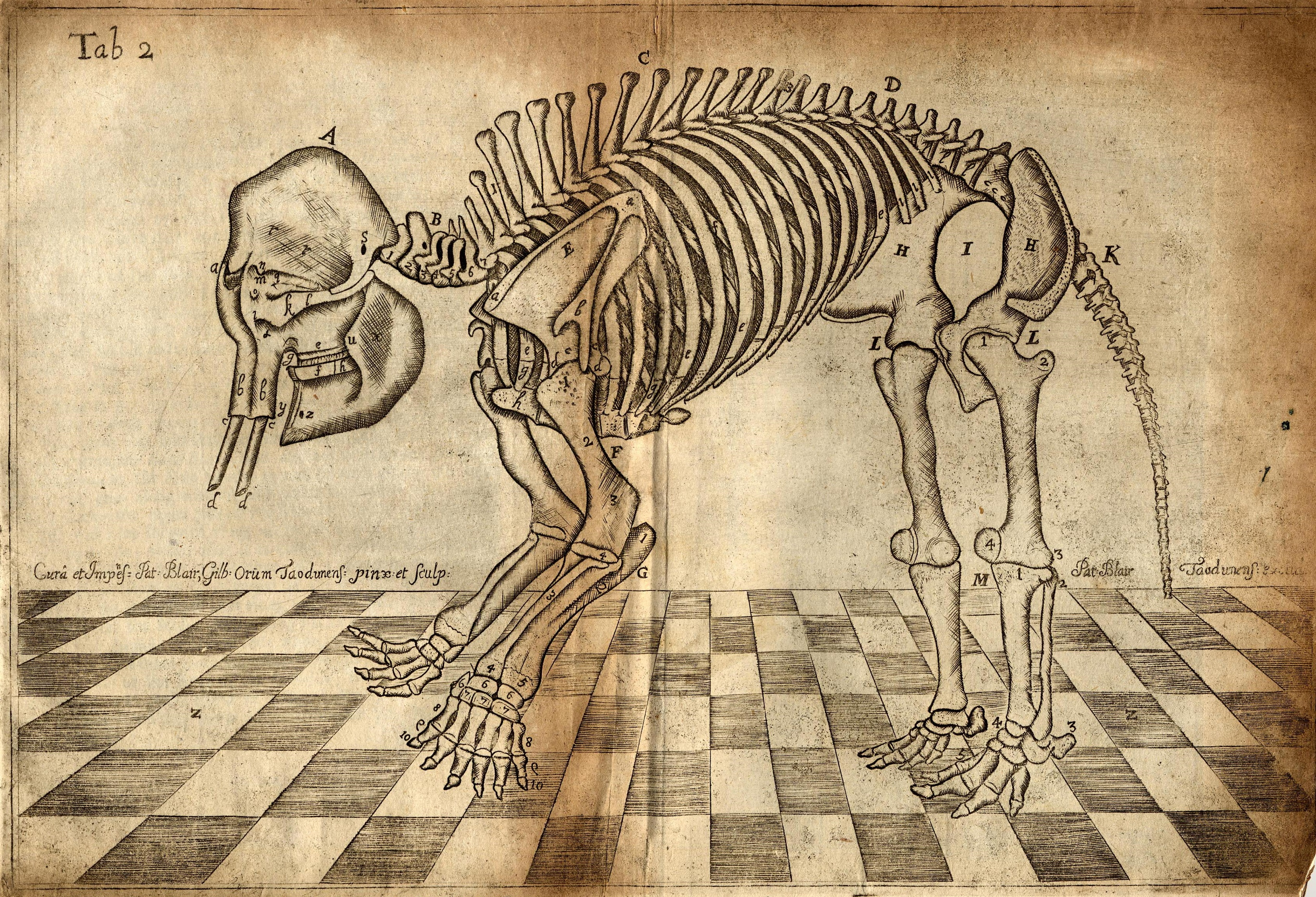
Engraving of the skeleton of the Dundee elephant, made by Patrick Blair/Gilbert Orum

Over the course of the next few weeks, Blair carefully and scientifically dissected and anatomised the elephant, studying every organ, limb, muscle and bone. He contacted Hans Sloane of the Royal Society of London, offering to write a report for the Society's Journal (Philosophical Transactions). Sloane agreed, and Blair's report, entitled Osteographia Elephantina, filled two consecutive issues of the journal in 1710. Blair subsequently (1717) published a study of the elephant's ear, in the same journal.

== Hall of Rarities ==
After the dissection was completed, Blair arranged to have the elephant's skin stuffed and the whole thing mounted as a museum exhibit. At the same time, he re-assembled all the bones to reconstruct the skeleton, which was also put on display. The resulting two exhibits attracted great admiration and attention. Surgeons from Edinburgh visited Dundee in the late summer of 1706, and offered to buy the stuffed elephant and its skeleton, and remove them both to Edinburgh. When this offer was turned down, the surgeons tried to sue the Dundee authorities in court, but their case did not succeed.

Blair now established a Hall of Rarities somewhere in Dundee, in which the elephant's remains were exhibited, along with other skeletons and natural history exhibits. According to a statement made by a Dundee gentleman in 1825, this museum also contained the skeletons of local worthies, including George Yeaman. The museum seems to have been abandoned in the early decades of the 19th century, and the contents were allegedly taken away by "a distinguished agriculturalist", with the bones "ground down and scattered for a top-dressing to some of the fields in Strathmore".

== See also ==
- List of individual elephants

== Works cited ==
- Blair, Patrick (1710). "Osteographia Elephantina, or a Full and Exact Description of all the Bones of an Elephant etc". Philosophical Transactions of the Royal Society. 27. London.
- Chevret, E. (1881). Recherches sur les anciens théatre de Beauvais. Beauvais.
- Cibber, Colley (1740). An Apology for the Life of Mr Colley Cibber etc. Dublin.
- Lister, Martin (1699). A Journey to Paris in the Year 1698. London. pp. 177–8.
- Marwick, J.D.; Wood, M. (1967). Extracts from the Records of the Burgh of Edinburgh. Vol. 13. Edinburgh: Scottish Burgh Records Society.
- Pieters, F.J.M. (2001). The Menagerie of 'The White Elephant' in Amsterdam, with Some Notes on Other 17th and 18th Century Menageries in The Netherlands. In:Die Kulturgeschichte des Zoos, edited by H. V. Lothar Dittrich, D. V. Engelhardt, and A. Rieke-Müller. Berlin: Verlag für Wissenschaft und Bildung. pp. 47–66. ISBN 9783861354826.
- Raptschinsky, B. (1936). "Russiche reizigers te Amsterdam in de XVIIIde eeuw". Jaarboek Amstelodamum. 33 !pages=155-170. Amsterdam.
- Roscam Abbing, Michiel (2014). "De Indische vrouwtjesolifant van Bartel Verhagen". Amstelodamum. 101. Amsterdam: 68–95.

== In Literature ==
- Drummond, Andrew (2008). Elephantina. Edinburgh: Polygon. ISBN 978-1846970443. Second edition: Drummond, Andrew (2018). Elephantina. Amazon. ISBN 9781983398704.
