= Advocates Close =

Alleyway in Edinburgh, Scotland

Coordinates: 55.95015°N 3.19144°W

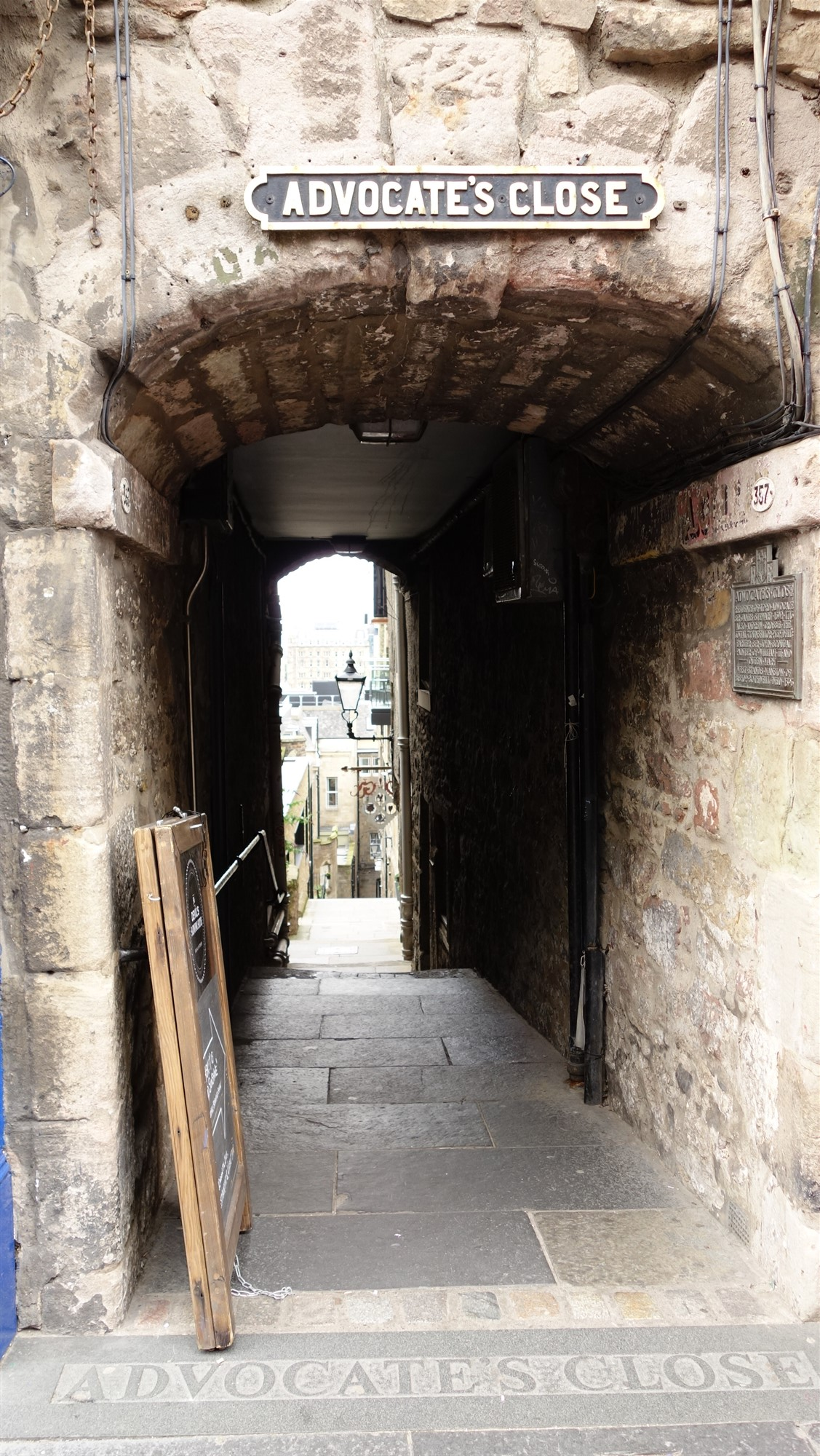
The entrance to Advocates Close

Advocate’s Close is a narrow and steep alley in Edinburgh of medieval origin, redeveloped in the early 21st century. With a multiplicity of steps it is not accessible to disabled persons.

The close leads from Market Street at the foot of Cockburn Street to the Royal Mile, exiting opposite St Giles Cathedral close to the Supreme Courts of Scotland.

Viewing from the Royal Mile down the close it frames a view of the Scott Monument.

== History ==
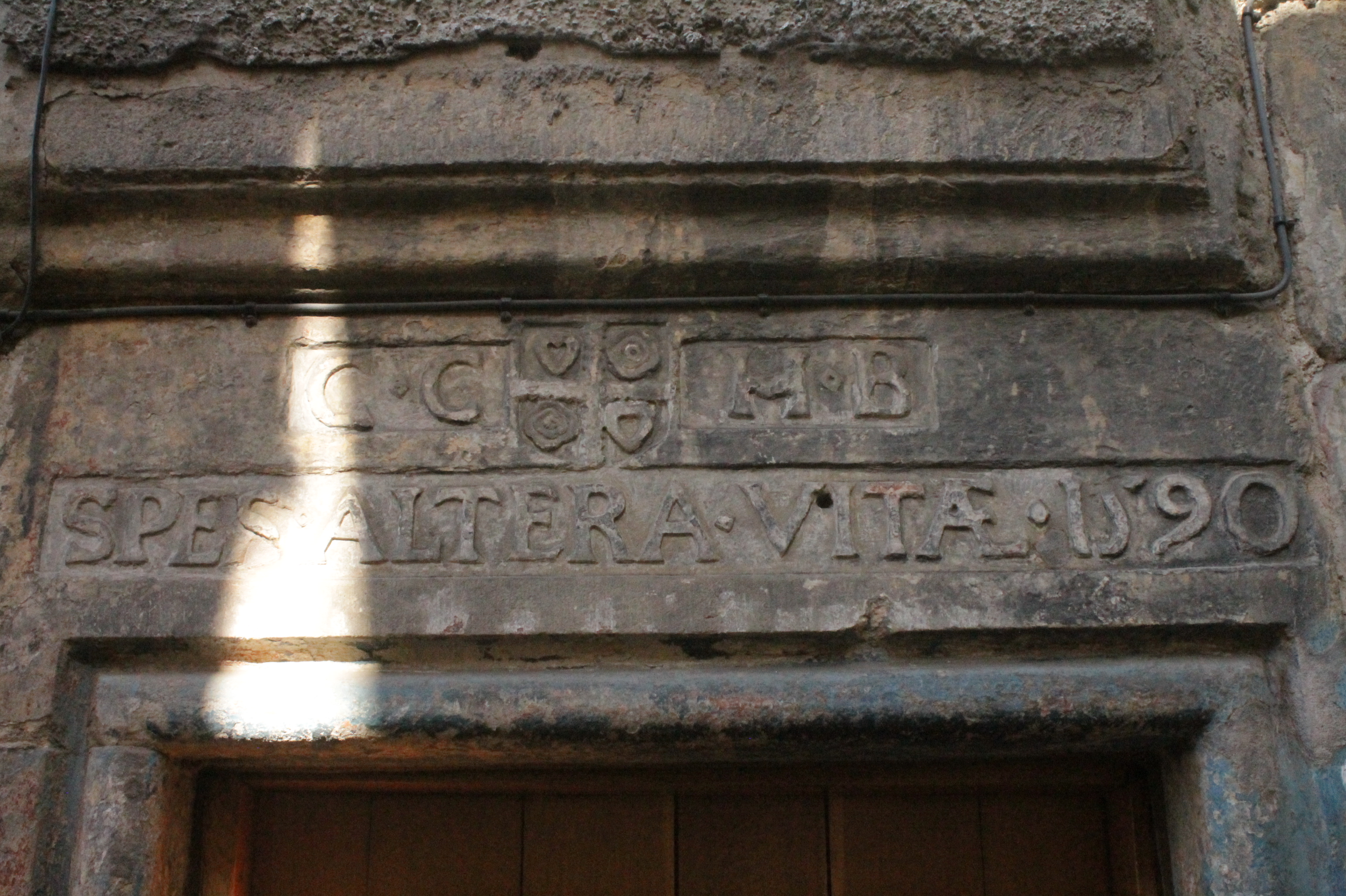
16th-century doorway with the initials of Clement Cor and his wife Helen Bellenden, 1590, Advocates Close.

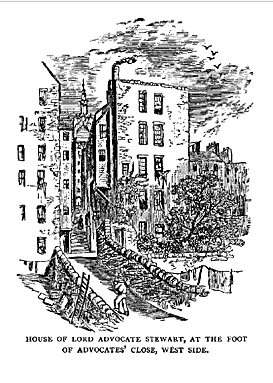
1870 drawing of the Lord Advocates house at the foot of Advocates Close

The street dates from at least the 15th century, and elements survive from at least the mid-16th century. At this time the street was a fashionable address, where the Scottish gentry and professionals would live with their family and servants. The name derives from the house of Sir James Stewart who was Lord Advocate.

Adam Bothwell's house stands on the west side of the close and was originally accessed from Byers Close. The house of the merchant Clement Cor survives on the east side.

By the 19th century the Edinburgh gentry had abandoned the Old Town and moved to the New Town or suburbs. Streets such as Advocates Close passed to the lower classes and were split into tenements. In this form, given the huge density and dark, narrow streets, the area quickly became a slum. A major part of this stemmed from the lack of sewerage, with waste being thrown out of the window to run down the steep slope.

Sections of the area west of the close (up to and including Warriston Close) were rebuilt as printworks and offices for W & R Chambers, employing 200 persons.

The main non-residential building in the 19th century was the Imperial Hotel, which stood at the lower end on the site of the Lord Advocate's house. This site was redeveloped several times: next as offices for the Edinburgh Evening News then as the main office for the Edinburgh Festival.

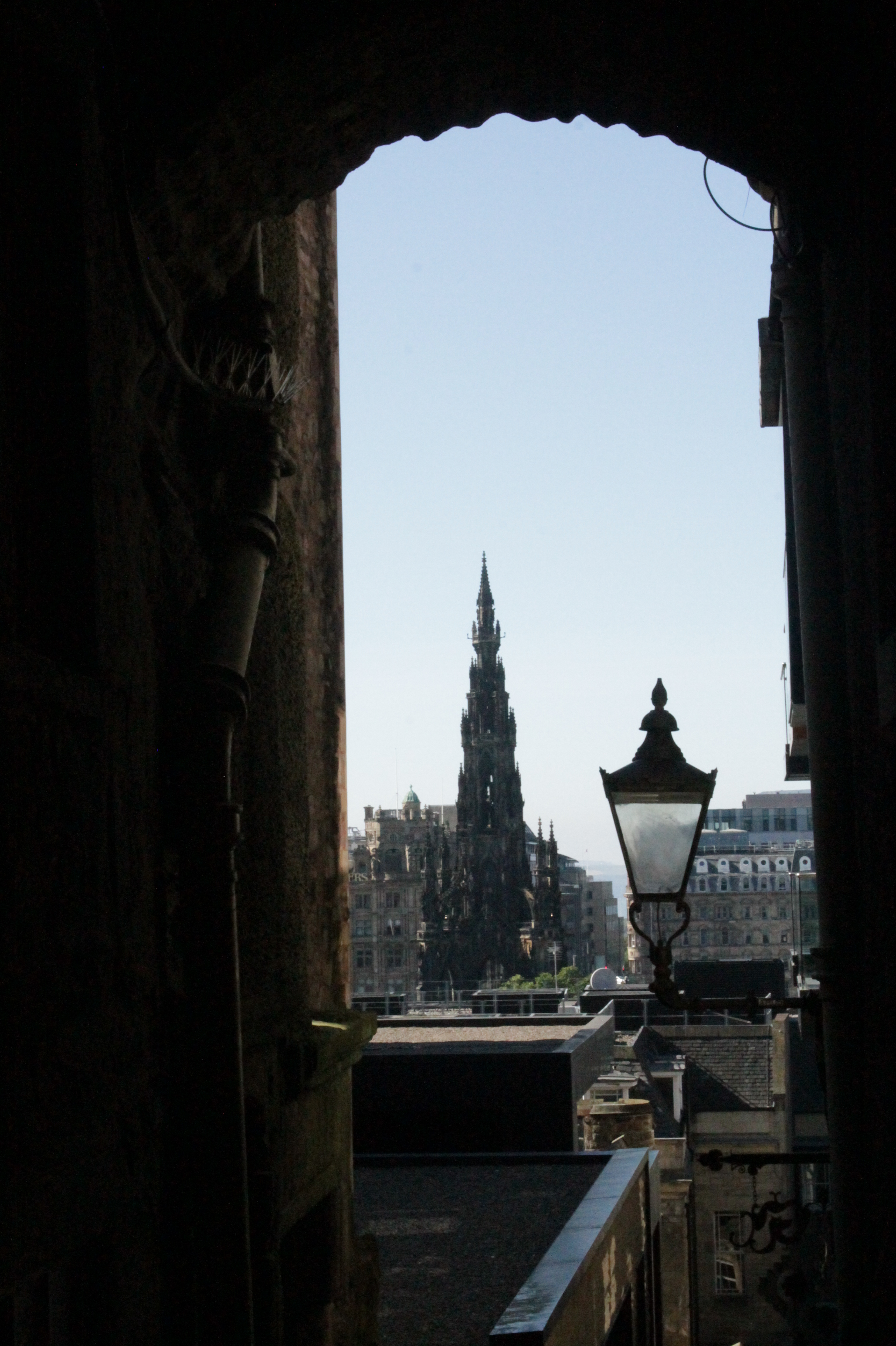
The iconic framed view of the Scott Monument from the top of Advocates Close

A number of 16th century buildings survive on the east side of the close. In the 1920s, as a result of slum clearance programmes, most of the buildings on the west side of the close were removed. This demolition retained various carved doorways but moved them together, where they now stand in a mutually impossible relationship for each to be used. The demolitions created a new view of the Scott Monument, which stands slightly off axis to the close.

The bronze plaque at the head of the close was added in 1935 by the City Architect, Ebenezer James MacRae.

The first renewal of interest in the street (other than as a viewpoint) was in 1993 when the newly created Old Town Conservation Committee chose to site their office in the oldest remaining building: Clement Cor's house at the head of the close on its east side. This involved a wholesale restoration of the building, revealing a large 16th century fireplace within and several painted ceilings. This block lost its top two floors in the slum clearance of the 1920s. A doorpiece slightly further down the close echoes the fireplace design.

== Redevelopment ==
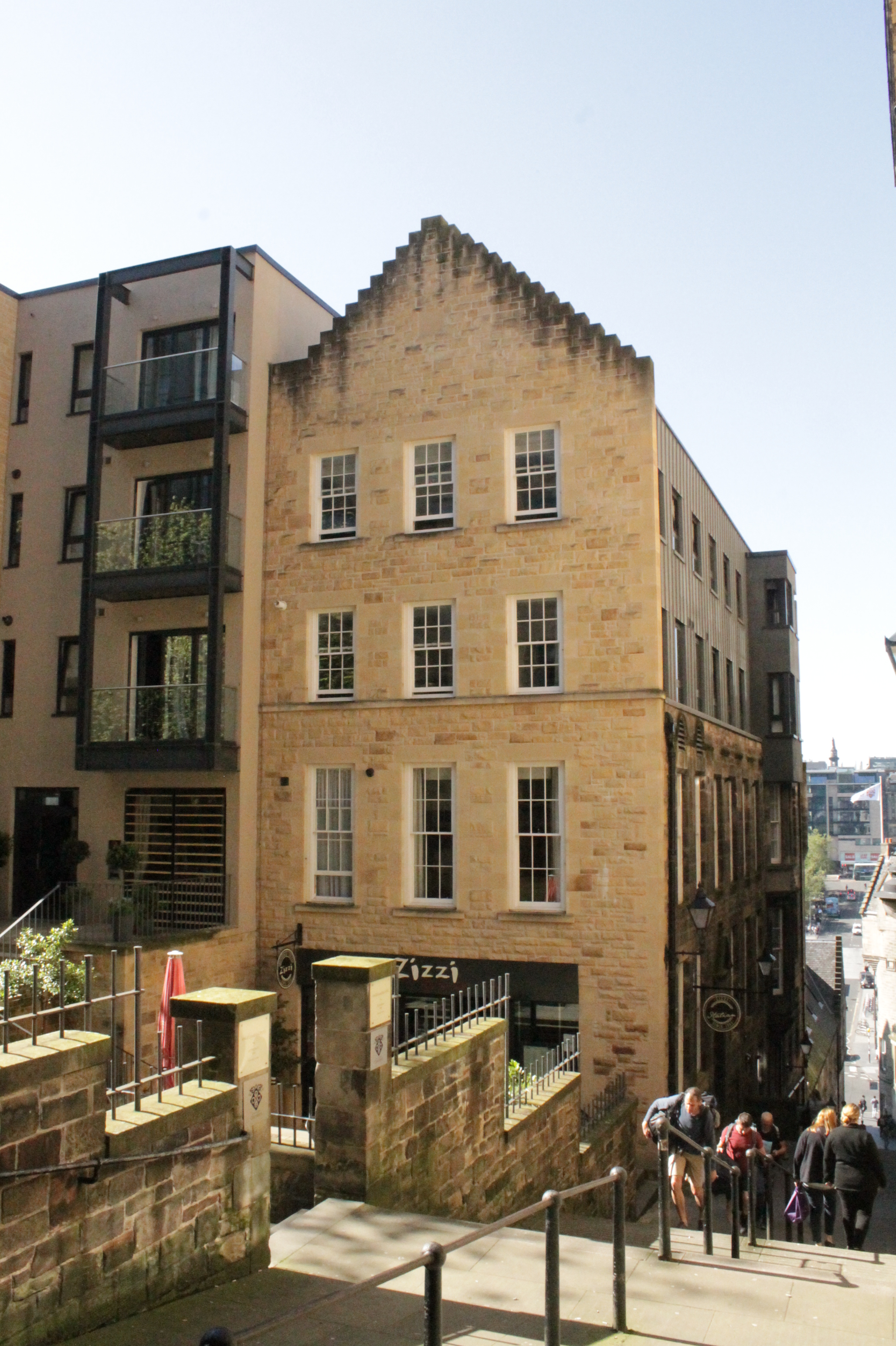
Roxburgh Court viewing down Warriston Close including the greatly rebuilt and extended building on the close - part of the award winning Advocates Close scheme

The scope of the scheme, although centred on Advocates Close, ran from Warriston Close to Byers Close/Evening News Steps, and from Market Street to the Royal Mile: one of the largest development sites ever in the Old Town, therefore highly sensitive.

The City of Edinburgh Council sold a large section of its former offices early in the 21st century, stretching along the length of Advocates Close. These ran from Market Street to the Royal Mile. In order to control the sensitive suite (which was expected to go to multiple developers) a rigid but generous development brief was created, with multiple urban design objectives: retaining the view of Scott Monument: retaining all closes and re-opening closed closes; creating a new square at Roxburgh Court; and adding missing storeys. A mix of modern and traditional forms was encouraged.

The buildings on the Royal Mile were converted first, including reopening of the long-closed Roxburgh Close. The Royal Mile section is so authentic that it is frequently forgotten that the entire ground floor is new. It is often forgotten that this was part of the redevelopment.

The section of the site between Roxburgh Close and Warriston Close was previously the huge publishing works of W & R Chambers.

The bulk of the lower buildings were originally obtained by a local company, Station Properties. A scheme was drawn up for redevelopment, mainly as flats, by Morgan McDonnell architects. Unfortunately, as a result of the banking scares at the end of 2008, despite being close to completion, the original developer was declared bankrupt and the scheme was relaunched under new ownership.

The development brief for the site required a new pedestrian link between the Evening News Steps and the centre of Advocates Close. It clarified which buildings had to be preserved, whilst allowing generous new-build, especially above the existing structures. The resultant mix of old and new is highly respectful of Edinburgh's historic character, whilst creating a vibrant new scheme of hotels, offices and bars.

At the centre of the redevelopment (topographically rather than conceptually) lies the bar, the "Devil's Advocate", converted from the 19th century boilerhouse which served the buildings to north and east. The northern part of the site is mainly occupied by a hotel operated by Motel One.

The zone to the south and east includes a new restaurant, Angels with Bagpipes, which was part of the development brief site, but developed by a separate architect. This overlooks Roxburgh Court to the east, which is the area of most change in the development as a whole. Here the planner co-ordinated different architects and developers to create a vibrant new square, connecting to Warriston Close.

Arguably the most dramatic change is the re-addition of two floors and a pitched roof on the Warriston Close building. This presents a new stone gable to Princes Street. On the courtyard side the architecture echoes the forms of the past but is 100% new.

The development won several awards including RIAS Andrew Doolan Best Building in Scotland Award for 2014, and due to the high planning input of the Planning function of City of Edinburgh it won the RTPI's Best Development on the Ground 2014. It also won the RICS award of 2015.

== Archaeology ==
Archaeological excavations undertaken in 2012 in advance of the redevelopment, by AOC Archaeology found the remains of a 16th-century tenement, which was owned at different times by the Cants, Hamiltons and Raes, all burgesses or merchants of the city. The tenement was demolished and back-filled with rubble during the late 19th century. The excavations provided information on the initial settlement of Edinburgh's Old Town in the 12th/13th century to the clearing and landscaping of the tenement area in the late 19th century. The artefacts found showed the expansion of the area in 16th and 17th centuries, as well as the decline during the later 17th and early 18th centuries.

== Famous residents ==
- Clement Cor, 16th-century merchant
- Andrew Crosbie FRSE (advocate)
- Sir James Stewart (Lord Advocate)
- David Dalrymple, Lord Westhall
- Adam Bothwell son of Francis Bothwell
- John Scougal, artist
