= Thomas Monteath Douglas =

Sir Thomas Monteath Douglas
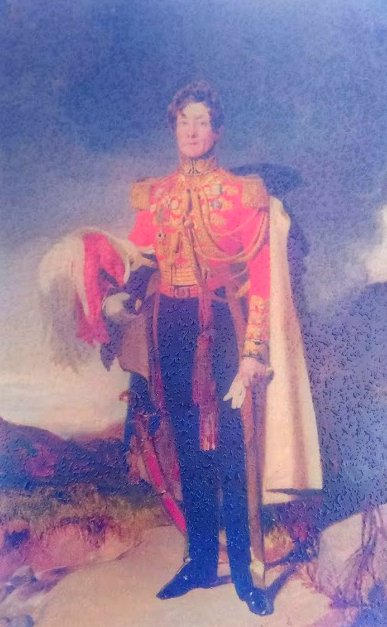
- artist and date unknown
- Born: Thomas Monteath; 1787; Hanover Parish, Jamaica
- Died: October 1868 (aged 80–81); Stonebyres, Lanarkshire, Scotland
- Military career
- Allegiance: East India Company United Kingdom
- Branch: Bengal Army
- Service years: 1806–1846
- Rank: General
- Unit: 35th Regiment of Bengal Native Infantry
- Conflicts: Bundelkhand Campaign (1809–10); Anglo-Nepalese War; Third Anglo-Maratha War; Marwar Campaign (1820); Siege of Bharatpur (1826); First Anglo-Afghan War
- Awards: Knight Commander of the Order of the Bath; Order of the Dooranee Empire

General Sir Thomas Monteath Douglas KCB ADC (1787 – October 1868) was an officer of the Bengal Army of the East India Company. He served in a number of wars and campaigns, most notably the First Anglo-Afghan War.

== Early life ==
Douglas was born Thomas Monteath, the son of Thomas Monteath and grandson of Walter Monteath, who married Jean, second daughter of James Douglas of Mains. This Jean was the sister of Margaret, who was the wife of Archibald, Duke of Douglas, and the Duchess of Douglas entailed an estate with the curious name of Douglas Support to the descendants of her sister, which was eventually inherited by Thomas Monteath. He was born in Hanover Parish in Jamaica.

Douglas entered the East India Company's service as an ensign in the Bengal Army on 4 December 1806, and was at once attached to the 35th Regiment of Bengal Native Infantry, with which he served throughout his long career.

== Career ==
Monteath first saw service under Sir Gabriel Martindell in the trying campaigns in Bundelkhand in 1809 and 1810, during which every one of the numerous forts of the small Bundela chieftains had to be stormed, and in these assaults Monteath, who had been promoted lieutenant on 9 September 1808, was twice wounded. He next served throughout the campaigns of the Anglo-Nepalese War in 1814 and 1815 under Jasper Nicolls and David Ochterlony, and was present at the battles of the Timlee Pass and of Kulinga, and at the assaults of Jountgarh and Srinagar, at which latter place he was again wounded. During the Third Anglo-Maratha War, he participated in the successful campaign against the Pindaris by Lord Hastings in 1818. The 35th Bengal Native Infantry was attached to the brigade which was sent to Bikaner in the extreme east of Rajputana, in order to hem in parties of raiders and drive them back into Central India, where Lord Hastings was waiting to meet and destroy them.

Monteath was next engaged in the Marwar Campaign of 1820, and was promoted to captain on 24 May 1821. In 1826 he was present at Lord Combermere's successful siege of Bharatpur and took part in the assault, for which he received a medal and clasp. He married Lucinda Florence Whish on 26 July 1826 at Meerut. They were to have a daughter before she died in 1837 at Lucknow.

He was promoted to major on 17 January 1829 and lieutenant-colonel on 2 April 1834, and commanded his regiment throughout the First Anglo-Afghan War, during which he made his reputation. His regiment was one of those which, under Sir Claude Martin Wade, forced the Khyber Pass, and co-operated with Sir John Keane's army from Bombay in the storming of Ghazni and the capture of Kabul in 1839. For his services during the campaign he received a medal, was made a Companion of the Order of the Bath, and selected by Shah Shujah as one of the officers to receive his newly formed Order of the Dooranee Empire.

After Kabul was taken, Monteath's regiment was one of those left to garrison the city, and remained there until October 1841, when, on the arrival of reinforcements, it was ordered with the 13th Light Infantry to return to India under the command of Sir Robert Sale. Hardly had this brigade started on its way when Afghans rose in rebellion and Sale had to fight his way to Jellalabad, where he took up defensive positions. In the famous defence of that city, Monteath, who owing to his rank was second in command, greatly distinguished himself. The story of the friendship between Monteath's regiment, the 35th Bengal Native Infantry, and the English 13th Light Infantry is related in Gleig's Sale's Brigade in Afghanistan. On 16 April 1842 the Jellalabad garrison was relieved by General George Pollock, and in the campaign which followed Monteath held command of a brigade. At the close of the campaign Monteath was promoted to colonel for his gallant conduct and appointed an aide-de-camp to the queen on 4 October 1842. On 7 September 1845 he was appointed colonel of his old regiment, and soon after left India.

== Later life ==
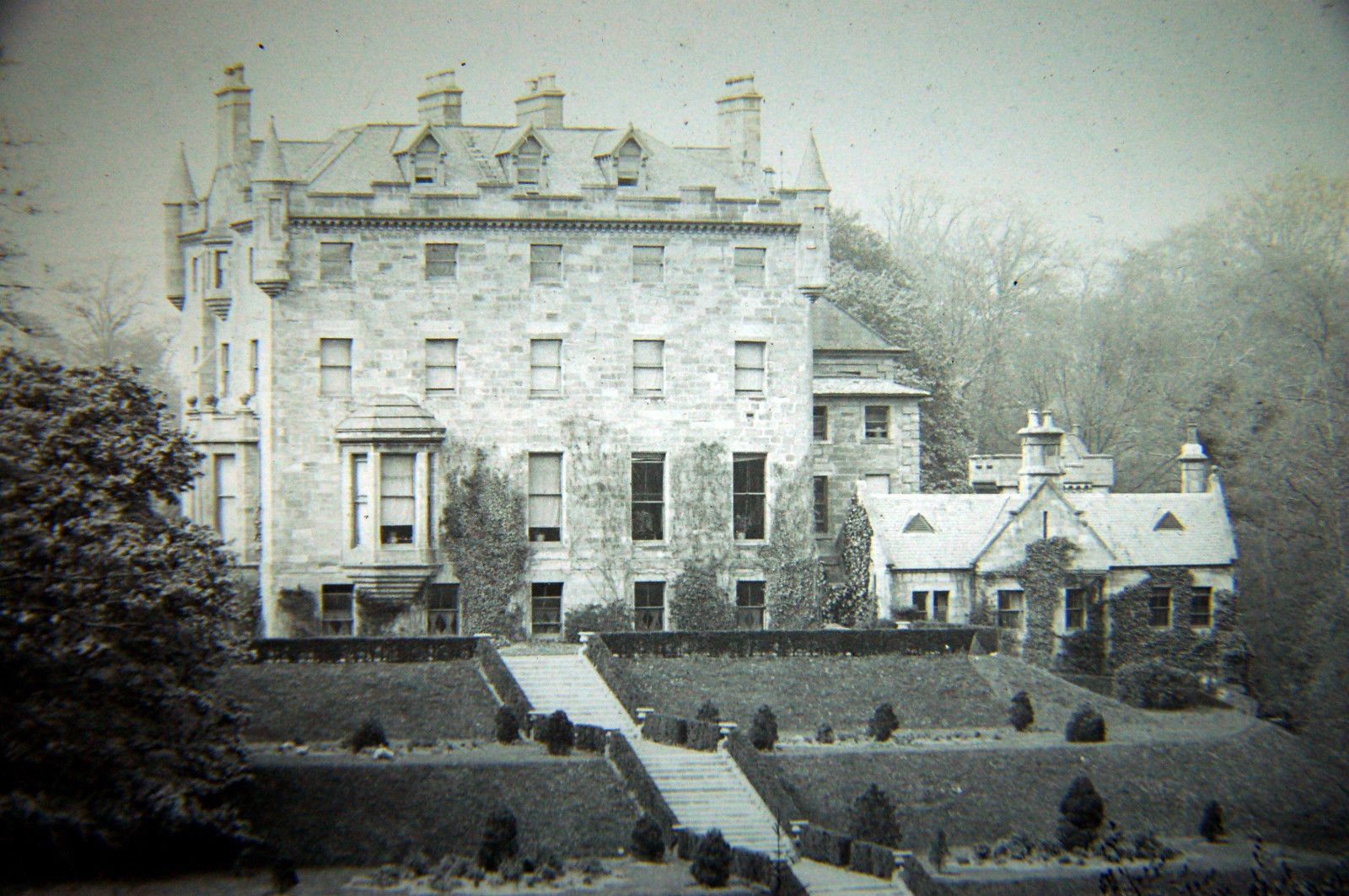
"Douglas Support" c. 1890, formerly known as Rosehall.

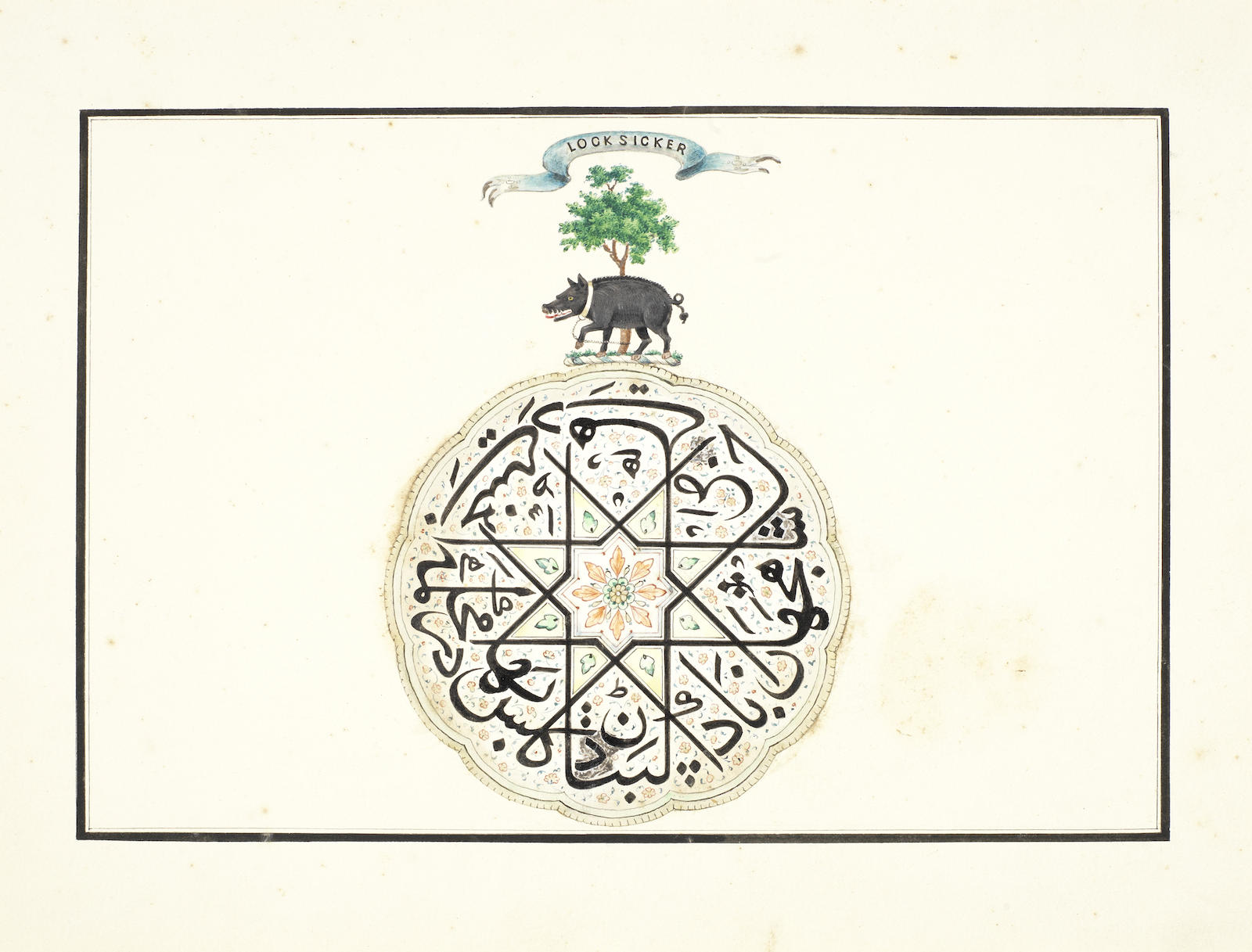
A design by Ghulam Ali Khan made in 1854 and part of a series of 31 paintings of Delhee and the Emperor that were enclosed in a leather presentation box.

In 1851, he succeeded to the estate of "Douglas Support" (near Bellshill in Lanarkshire) under the entail of the Duchess of Douglas, and took the name Douglas in addition to his own. He never returned to India, but was promoted in due course to be major-general on 20 June 1854, lieutenant-general on 18 March 1856, and full general on 9 April 1865. In March 1865 he was made a Knight Commander of the Order of the Bath in recognition of his long services during the early years of the century. He died at Stonebyres in Lanarkshire in October 1868.

== Legacy ==
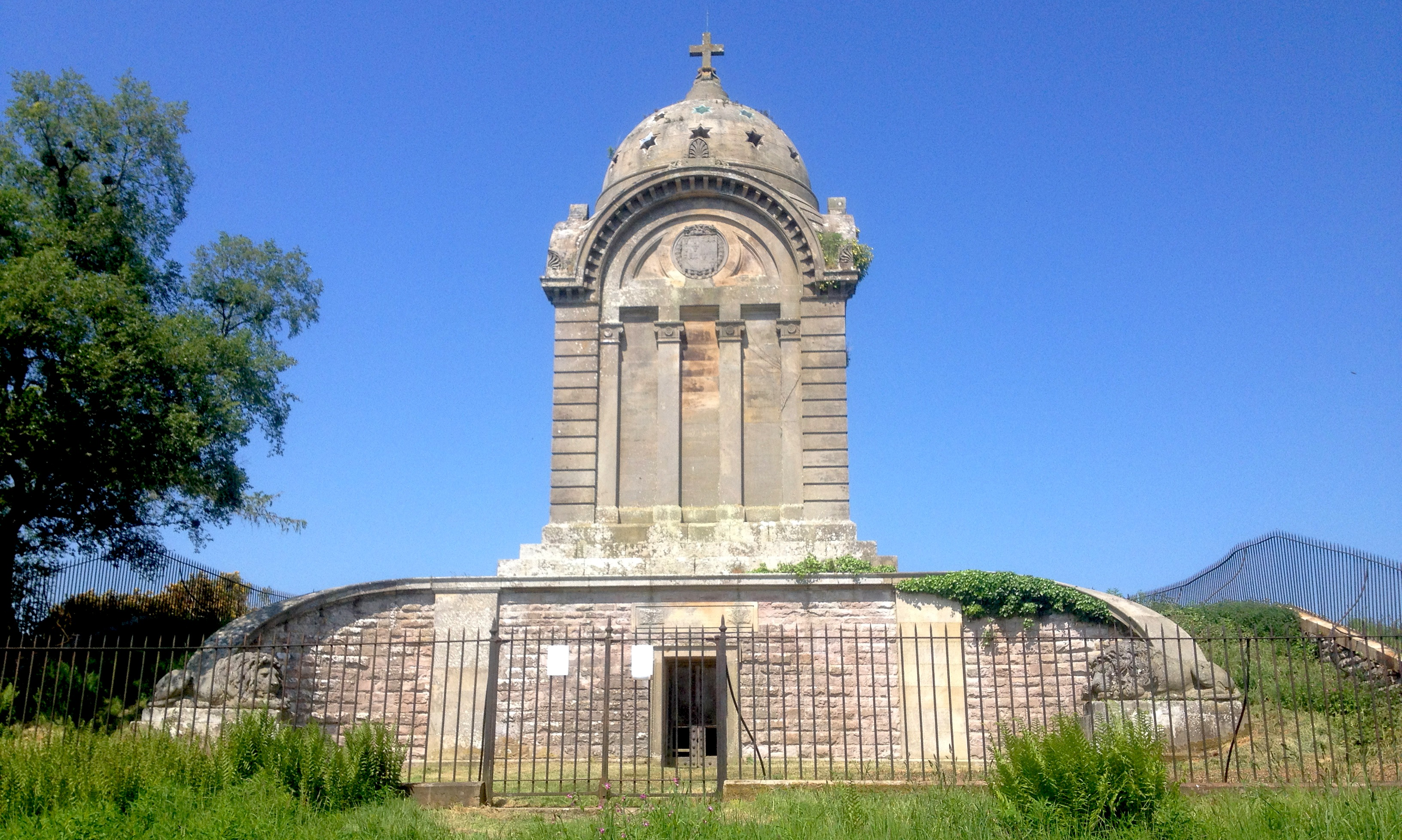
His mausoleum

At the end of his life he commissioned the Monteath Mausoleum which was built to the north of Jedburgh near Ancrum. The land belonged to his son in law Sir William Monteath Scott. The mausoleum was designed by the Edinburgh architects Peddie & Kinnear. The building is dated 1864 which is four years before Douglas died. In 2014 a group was formed to organise a renovation of the building which was complete in 2019.

In 2013 a series of 31 paintings made by Ghulam Ali Khan were placed for auction at Bonhams by an anonymous seller. The 31 paintings were enclosed in their original presentation box. The paintings were of views of Delhi and they include portraits of the last Emperor of Delhi Bahadur Shah Zafar and his sons. These are some of the last examples of this artist who died in 1855. In 1857 Queen Victoria becoming Empress of India. The recipient of the paintings is not explicit but the auctioneers believed that the "Captain Douglas" mentioned was this man.

== Works cited ==
- This article incorporates text from a publication now in the public domain: Stephens, Henry Morse (1888). "Douglas, Thomas Monteath". In Stephen, Leslie (ed.). Dictionary of National Biography. Vol. 15. London: Smith, Elder & Co. pp. 353–354.
