= George Warren (East India Company officer) =

British general

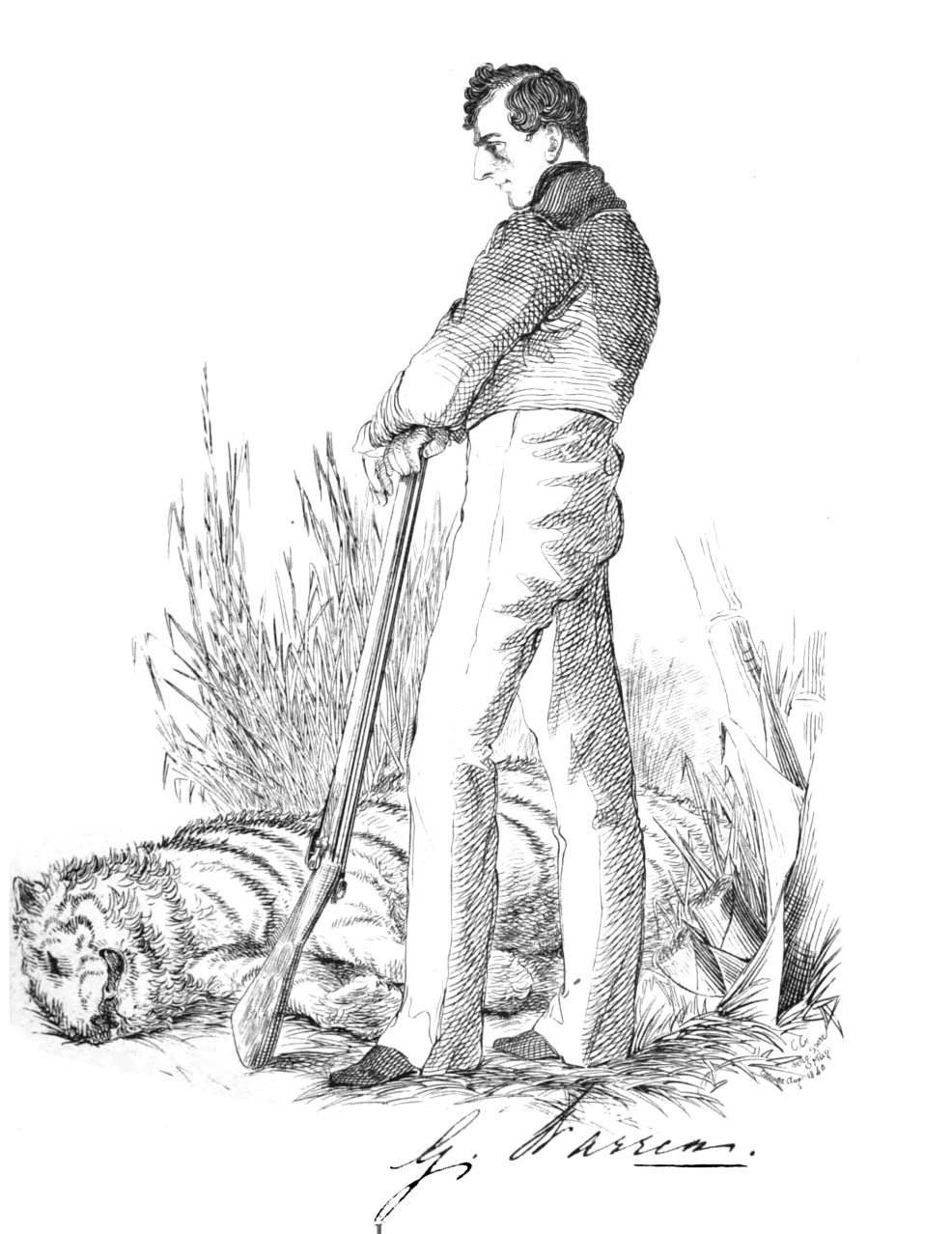
- Portrait by Colesworthey Grant
- Born: c.1801 Topsham, Devon
- Died: 22 June 1884, aged 83; Southsea, Portsmouth, Hampshire
- Spouse: Isabella Barry Fitzgerald (m. 1840–1884)
- Military career
- Branch: Royal Munster Fusiliers (101st)
- Rank: General
- Awards: Order of the Dooranee Empire (3rd class)

George Warren (c.1801 – 1884) was a British General who was a major figure in the Afghan and Indian wars of the early 19th century.

== Biography ==
George Warren was born in Topsham, Devon about 1801. He joined the Honourable East India Company's 1st Bengal European Regiment (which, much later after several mergers, became the Royal Munster Fusiliers) and was stationed in India. On 4 March 1823, Lieutenant Warren arrived in Madras aboard HMS Warren Hastings. On 18 January 1826, he took part in the Storming of the Jungeena Gate at Bhurtpore. On 16 March 1839, as a Brigadier, he described the soldiers' appearance during the passage of the Bolan Pass as

an army retreating under every disaster; public stores and private property lying about scattered and abandoned in every direction

On 17 September of the same year, he was awarded the Order of the Dooranee Empire, 3rd class. He progressed quickly to the rank of General and remained in India until the early 1860s. He retired to the United Kingdom, firstly to Sudley Lodge, South Bersted, Sussex, and then to Portsea, Portsmouth and Southsea, where he died.

His medals from the 1839 campaign are in the Watson Medal Collection (Afghan War), Fitzwilliam Museum, Cambridge.

== Family ==
On 15 August 1840 at Calcutta Cathedral, India, Lt-Col George Warren married Isabella Barry Fitzgerald (1818, Dublin – 15 January 1900, 'Granville', Pelham Road, Portsea, Hampshire), the daughter of William Fitzgerald of Dublin, and had issue:

1. William Henry Oakes Warren (born 19 January 1843, Calcutta)
2. Isabella Palmer Warren (28 June 1846, Calcutta – 1880, Portsea)
3. Emily Grace Warren (29 July 1848, Calcutta – 1915, Slinfold, Sussex), who married Roger Granville Pulteney Eliot (a grandson of Francis Perceval Eliot) in 1871
4. Frederick Penrose Warren (born 2 February 1850, Fort William, Calcutta, Bengal, India) who married Maria Goodfellow 13 October 1888, Bexhill, Sussex, England
5. Edward Harrington Warren (16 August 1852, Barrackpore, India – 1893, Portsea), who married Eliza Salter Talbot in 1880, Portsea Island
6. Walter Gilbert Warren (born 12 May 1851, Fort William, Bengal, India)
7. Arthur Septimus Warren (20 June 1854, Fort William, Calcutta, Bengal, India – 27 December 1943, Surrey, England), who married Lily Edith Tindall 1891, Chorlton, Lancs
8. Florence Temple Warren (born 1860, Brompton, London), who married Arthur Nathaniel Davis in 1883
9. Harriette Annie Sloper (Annie) Warren (born 1863, Belgium), who married Harry Bingham Thomas on 8 January 1885 at St John's Church, Darlinghurst, NSW, Australia

On 22 June 1884, at his home in 1 Brandon Terrace, Southsea, Hampshire, Warren died, aged 83.
