= Stonebyres =

Coordinates: 55.6742°N 3.8442°W

Stonebyres was an estate and country house in Lanarkshire, Scotland, belonging to the Weir, or de Vere, family from earliest recorded history. The Weir-de Veres were a cadet branch of the Weir family of Blackwood but were a powerful and sometimes rival branch of the laird of Blackwood, head of Clan Weir. The laird of Stonebyres was often styled Baron Stonebyres.

Stonebyres Castle stood by the Linn Burn, a tributary of the River Clyde, around 4 kilometres (2.5 mi) west of Lanark. The keep, which was extant in the 15th century, measured 10 by 8.8 metres (33 by 29 ft). It was later extended to more than twice this size, and in 1850 it was remodelled as a Scots Baronial-style mansion. It was demolished in 1934, though some ruined walls survive. The coach house and a walled garden also remain nearby. Thomas de Vere is said to have been the laird of Stonebyres Castle in the 13th century.

A second structure, Cairnie Castle, was near the cliffs above Stonebyres Falls on the Clyde. The remains of this structure were recorded in 1794, but nothing remains today. Stonebyres Falls is now the site of a hydroelectric power station.

James Vere of Stonebyres (c.1715–1759) served as Member of Parliament for Lanarkshire from 1754 until his death. An extravagant spendthrift, he was obliged to sell part of the family estates, as was his successor who inherited his debts.

Mrs. Vere of Stonebyres is a painting by Sir Henry Raeburn (1756–1823), circa 1805. The subject was the wife of Daniel Vere of Stonebyres, sheriff of Lanarkshire, and was the former Jacobina Leslie, daughter of James, Count Leslie. She was Raeburn's step-daughter, following his marriage to Leslie's widow Anne. Mrs. Vere died 13 December 1820.

Stonebyres was purchased in 1842 by James Monteath for £25,600. He extended the house, spending additional £25,999 to do so. The purchase price had come from money inherited from Major Archibald James Douglas Monteath, who reputedly had made his fortune in India with treasure looted from a Maharaja's treasure elephant.

James later succeed to the Douglas family's Douglas Support estate when he assumed the surname of Douglas. James Monteath Douglas died unmarried in 1850 and was succeeded by his cousin, General Sir Thomas Monteath Douglas, who died at Stonebyres in 1868.

Stonebyres was then leased out for the remainder of the century as James's only surviving daughter Amelia, having married Sir William Monteath Scott of Ancrum made that her home.

Dame Amelia's daughter, Constance acquired the estate from her mother and in turn sold it to James Noble Graham, of Carfin, in 1906. However, having spent £60,000 on Stonebyres, he became bankrupt and Constance regained ownership in 1924.

Constance died in 1933, and the house passed to the Department of Agriculture which created small holdings for unemployed men from Auchenheath. The house was demolished in 1934, though elements of the estate remain.
