= Hugh Wheeler (East India Company officer) =

British army officer (1789–1857)

Sir Hugh Wheeler, KCB
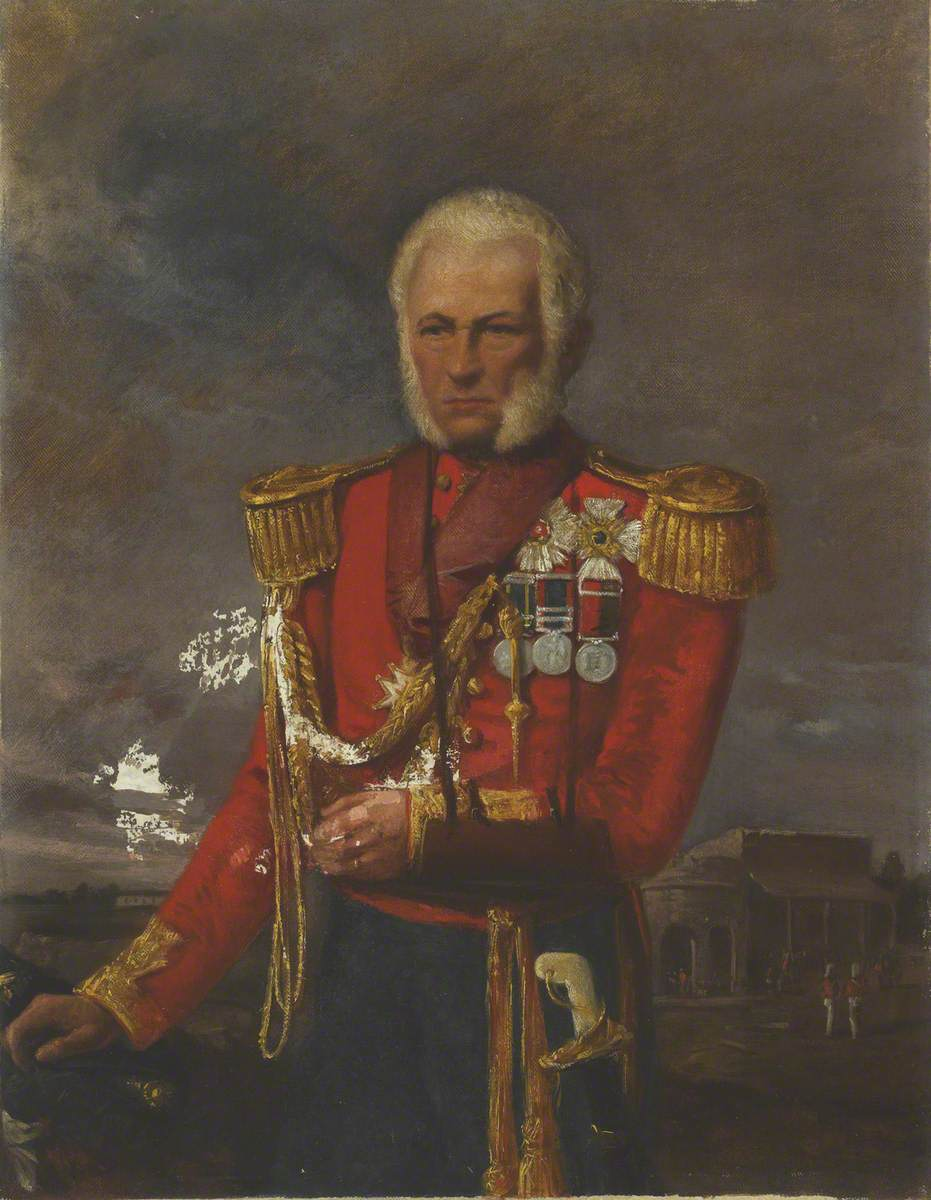
- Wheeler at Cawnpore, c.1857
- Born: 30 June 1789; County Tipperary, Ireland
- Died: 27 June 1857 (aged 67); Cawnpore, India
- Military career
- Allegiance: United Kingdom; East India Company
- Branch: Bengal Army
- Service years: 1803–1857
- Rank: Major General
- Conflicts: First Anglo-Afghan War; First Anglo-Sikh War; Second Anglo-Sikh War; Indian Rebellion of 1857
- Awards: Order of the Durrani Empire; KCB

Sir Hugh Massy Wheeler KCB (30 June 1789 – 27 June 1857) was an Anglo-Irish officer in the army of the East India Company. He commanded troops in the First Anglo-Afghan War, and the First and Second Anglo-Sikh Wars, and in 1856 was appointed commander of the garrison at Cawnpore (now Kanpur). He is chiefly remembered for the disastrous end to a long and successful military career, when his defence of Wheeler's entrenchment and surrender to Nana Sahib during the Indian Rebellion of 1857 led to the annihilation of almost all the European, Eurasian and Christian Indian population of Cawnpore, himself and several members of his family included.

== Background and early life ==
Wheeler came from an Anglo-Irish background. His father, Hugh Wheeler, was a captain in the East India Company Service; his mother, Margaret, was the daughter of Hugh Massy, 1st Baron Massy. Wheeler was born on 30 June 1789 in Clonbeg, County Tipperary. He attended Bath Grammar School and was commissioned a cadet in the Bengal Army in 1803. Arriving in India in 1805, he joined the forces of Lord Lake.

== First Anglo-Afghan War ==
In April 1805, aged just fifteen, Wheeler was posted as a lieutenant to the 24th Native Infantry. He was promoted to captain in 1819, transferred to the 48th Native Infantry in 1824, and was further promoted to major in 1829 and lieutenant-colonel in 1835. He formed a relationship with Frances Oliver (née Marsden), an Anglo-Indian woman who was married to another officer. The couple had a number of children together and eventually married when Frances was widowed.

Wheeler led the 48th Native Infantry during the Afghan War in 1838–9, taking part in the capture of Ghazni and Kabul. In December 1840, he returned to India as part of the escort of the captive ruler of Afghanistan, Dost Mohammad Khan , who had been replaced by Shah Shujah Durrani. For his part in the campaign, Wheeler was twice mentioned in despatches, made a companion of the Order of the Bath, and awarded the order of the Durani Empire.

Amongst the British and Indian forces who remained in Kabul was Thomas Oliver, lieutenant-colonel of the 5th Native Infantry and the husband of Wheeler's partner Frances. He was killed in November 1841 while defending the city from attack by the supporters of Akbar Khan, the son of deposed Dost Mohammad Khan. Also killed in November 1841 was Wheeler's son Frank, who was fighting in Shah Shujah Durrani's Army. A few months later, on 6 March 1842, Frances Oliver and Wheeler were married in Agra. On the same day, their three youngest children, Patrick, Margaret and Robert, were baptised. Another son, Francis, was born three months later.

== Anglo-Sikh Wars ==
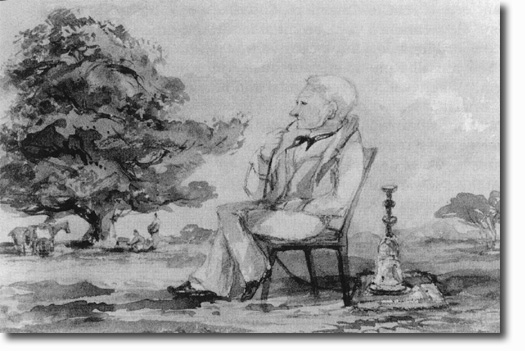
Hugh Massy Wheeler by Charles D'Oyly

During the First Anglo-Sikh War , Wheeler commanded an infantry brigade composed of the 50th Foot and the 48th Native Infantry. At the Battle of Mudki in December 1845, he was wounded, but was able to take part in the Battle of Aliwal the following month as second in command to Sir Harry Smith. For his services, he was made aide-de-camp to Queen Victoria (an honorary appointment) and was posted colonel to the 48th Native Infantry. He stayed in the Punjab, commanding the forces in Jullunder Doab, the region surrendered by the Sikhs at the Treaty of Lahore.

The Second Anglo-Sikh War in 1848-9 saw Wheeler leading forces involved in the capture of Rangar Nangal Fort, of Kalawala and of the heights of Dallah. He was twice mentioned in despatches and earned the praise of the governor-general: "Brigadier-General Wheeler, C. B., has executed the several duties which have been committed to him with great skill and success, and the Governor-General has been happy in being able to convey to him his thanks thus publicly." Wheeler was amongst those named in a vote of thanks in both the House of Commons and the House of Lords in April 1849, and the following year he was made a KCB.

At the end of the fighting, Wheeler resumed his command in Jullunder Doab, being promoted to major-general in June 1854, and visited Ireland on furlough in 1853–1855. Having returned to India, he was appointed in June 1856 to his final post as commander of the Cawnpore Division.

== Cawnpore ==
By the time he was posted to Cawnpore, Wheeler was 67 years old and had spent some 50 years in India. He was a small, slight man, described by Captain Mowbray Thomson of the 53rd Native Infantry as: "short, of a spare habit, very grey, with a quick and intelligent eye; not imposing in appearance except by virtue of a thoroughly military gait... a first-rate equestrian". He had made India his home, married the daughter of an Indian woman, spoke Hindi fluently and was popular with the sepoys.

The garrison town of Cawnpore, situated on the Grand Trunk Road and the banks of the River Ganges, 800 river miles from the seat of government in Calcutta, had been set up in 1770 on the site of a small village called Kanhpur when British East India Company troops had been fighting with the Nawab of Oudh against the Maratha. The camp quickly expanded as traders and craftsmen followed the army. In 1801, when the town became British territory, they were joined by the East India Company's civil servants. Wives and families came out from England, and Cawnpore acquired all the amenities of an English town. By the time Wheeler took up his post as commander, Cawnpore was connected to Calcutta by telegraph and steamboats, and there were plans to bring the railway to the town.

North of Cawnpore was the small town of Bithoor, where, at the end of the Third Anglo-Maratha War, the captured Peshwa, Baji Rao II, had been installed by the British with his entourage and a large pension. After Baji Rao died in 1851, his adopted son Nana Sahib stayed on in Bithoor. In spite of his disagreement with the British over his entitlement to inherit the pension, he was on friendly terms with them and frequently entertained Company officers and civilians.

== Rebellion ==
When the Indian Rebellion of 1857 broke out in Meerut, near Delhi, on 10 May 1857, Cawnpore was home to the 1st, 53rd and 56th Native Infantry and the 2nd Bengal Cavalry. These regiments, in common with the other regiments of the East India Company Army, consisted of British officers and Indian soldiers (called sepoys in the case of infantrymen and sowars in the case of cavalrymen). The total number of native troops in Cawnpore in 1857 was about 3,000, compared to about 300 British soldiers (the officers of the Native Regiments, a small number of men of the 84th Regiment, some invalids from the 32nd Regiment, and a few Artillerymen and Madras Fusiliers).

As news spread of more disturbances, the atmosphere in Cawnpore became tense, although the hope was still that Wheeler's experience and popularity would be enough to prevent an uprising amongst his troops. Wheeler sent daily telegrams to the governor-general in Calcutta. For example, on 20 May, he wrote: "All well here and excitement less..." and on 24 May ", All is quiet here, but it is impossible to say how long it will continue to be so". At the same time, he gave orders for the entrenchment of a barracks in order, if the need arose, to provide shelter for the European, Eurasian and Indian Christian population of the town.

Wheeler has sometimes been criticised for selecting a position that would prove difficult to defend, rather than the fortified magazine on the Delhi road several miles away from Native lines. Others have sought to justify his decision, suggesting that a withdrawal to the magazine might have provoked an uprising, and that he could not have foreseen the rebellious troops remaining in Cawnpore or being joined by Nana Sahib. Nana Sahib's biographer concludes:

"It is unfortunate that a General with a brilliant career such as Wheeler's should be remembered mainly for the blunder he committed towards the end of his life. But the truth is that he had taken too many things for granted. For the success of Wheeler's plan it was essential that the sepoys should march to Delhi immediately after the outbreak, and secondly, that Nana Sahib should stand by the English. Both of these were possible, but by no means certain. The military commander who imagines that the enemy will move in a way to suit his own convenience, and hopes for the best, often ends in disaster."

At the beginning of June, Wheeler felt confident enough to send two officers and about fifty men from his small British force to help Henry Lawrence at Lucknow. But on the night of 5 June, the 2nd Bengal Cavalry and the 1st Native Infantry rose and left the barracks, although, unlike at other places such as Meerut and Delhi, they did not harm their officers. The following morning, amidst some confusion, they were joined by most of the 53rd and 56th Native Infantry Regiments, although some sepoys joined Wheeler in the entrenchment.

== Siege of Cawnpore ==
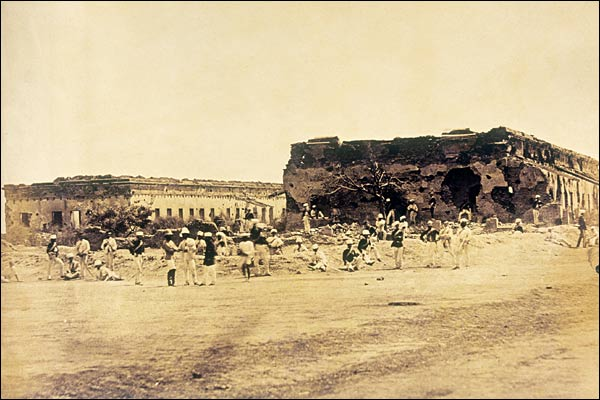
The ruins of Wheeler's entrenchment in 1858.

At first, the rebellious soldiers acted as Wheeler had anticipated and set off on the road to Delhi. However, the following day, 6 June, they returned to Cawnpore, with Nana Sahib at their head. The role Nana Sahib took in planning the rebellion in Cawnpore has never been established. He would, after the rebellion was over, claim that he was forced to, join the rebels. That morning, Nana Sahib sent a note to Wheeler announcing his intention to attack the entrenchment, and his forces soon opened fire.

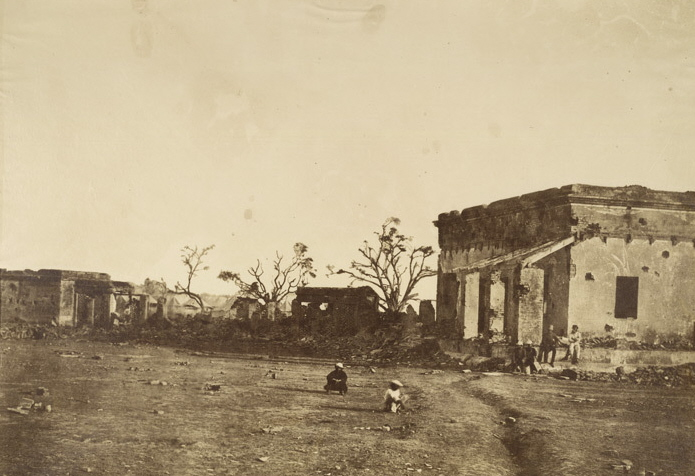
Hospital in General Wheeler's entrenchment, Cawnpore, 1858

Wheeler's entrenchment contained two large barracks buildings (one used as a hospital) and various outlying buildings. A trench had hastily been dug, and the earth from it formed a wall about four feet high. Several batteries of guns were set up. In all there were about 1,000 people in the entrenchment, but only about 300 were soldiers, the rest being civilians and, mainly, women and children. The entrenchment was ill-equipped for a long siege. Food was not plentiful, water was a particular problem as the only well was in an exposed position, guns were in short supply, and the hospital building burned down when hit by a missile. Disease and heat, as well as enemy bombardment, took their toll. Amongst the soldiers killed was General Wheeler's son, Godfrey. Nevertheless, the entrenchment held out for three weeks and repelled several attempts to seize it. According to Mowbray Thomson, one of the very few British survivors of Cawnpore, the original plans for defending the entrenchment had been made by Wheeler and Captain John Moore, who was in command of the invalids depot of the 32nd Foot. As the siege progressed, it was Captain Moore who took the more active role in defence: "Sir Hugh Wheeler was invariably consulted, but the old General was quite incapacitated for the exposure and fatigue involved in the superintendence of all the posts of defence".

Wheeler managed, via a messenger, to send a request for 200 reinforcements to Lucknow. "The whole Christian population", he wrote, "is with us in a temporary entrenchment, and our defence has been noble and wonderful, our loss heavy and cruel. We want aid, aid, aid..." The reply came back from Sir Henry Lawrence that, since the rebels controlled the banks of the Ganges, any attempt to send reinforcements would be futile.

== Death at the Satichaura Ghat ==
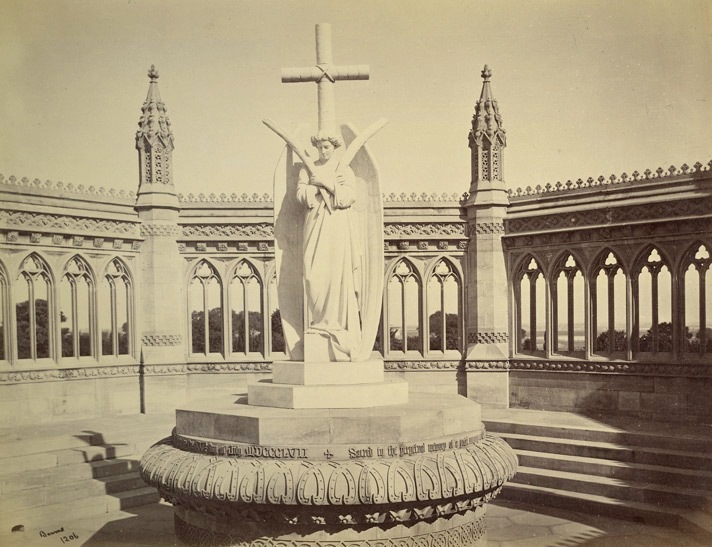
Memorial Well in remembrance of the Cawnpore massacre during the Indian rebellion of 1857

On 25 June, nearly three weeks after the beginning of the siege, Nana Sahib sent a messenger to the entrenchment with the offer of safe passage to Allahabad in return for surrender. According to Mowbray Thomson, Wheeler was against surrender:

"Sir Hugh Wheeler, still hopeful of relief from Calcutta, and suspicious of treachery on the part of the Nana, for a long time most strenuously opposed the idea of making terms; but upon the representation that there were only three days' rations in store, and after the often-reiterated claims of the women and children, and the most deplorable destitution in which we were placed, he at last succumbed to Captain Moore's expostulations, and consented to the preparation of a treaty of capitulation."

At that very moment, Henry Lawrence was penning a letter to Wheeler, urging him to hold out as Henry Havelock was marching from Allahabad to Cawnpore with four hundred British soldiers and three hundred Sikhs, and warning him not to trust Nana Sahib. But Wheeler never received the letter.

During the early morning of 27 June, Wheeler and the survivors of the entrenchment were led down to the River Ganges, where boats were waiting at the Satichaura Ghat. The British had been allowed to keep their small arms. The banks were lined with guns and armed sepoys and sowars, and while the British were embarking on the boats, firing broke out. Wheeler, his wife and his elder daughter were amongst those killed in the ensuing massacre. Survivors of the massacre were captured and either killed immediately or, in the case of the women and children, on 16 July as British forces approached Cawnpore. It has not been conclusively established whether the massacre was planned, and whether Nana Sahib was responsible. Four British soldiers managed to reach safety. A similar number of Anglo-Indian women survived; Wheeler's younger daughter is thought to have been among them, carried off by a sowar.

== Family ==
In 1842, Wheeler married Frances Matilda, daughter of Frederick Marsden, an officer in the East India Company Army, and an Indian woman. Her uncle was the linguist William Marsden. They had nine children (seven sons and two daughters), seven of them born before their marriage in 1842 and two afterwards. Wheeler also had a son from a previous relationship; Frances had two sons by her first husband, Thomas Samuel Oliver, who was killed in the First Afghan War in 1841. All the sons of Hugh and Frances Wheeler, except one, joined the Bengal Army or the British Indian Army, four of them attaining the rank of general. One, George, married his cousin Margaret Alicia Massy; their son George Godfrey Massy Wheeler was awarded the Victoria Cross in 1915. Frances Wheeler, son Godfrey and two daughters were with Wheeler at Cawnpore in May 1857. Godfrey was killed in the entrenchment; Frances and the elder daughter, Eliza, were killed with Wheeler at the Satichaura Ghat. The memorial tablets in All Souls Church, Kanpur, includes the following inscription: "Sir H. Wheeler, K. C. B.; Lady Wheeler and daughters; Lieutenant G. R. Wheeler, 1st N. I., A.-D.-C." Wheeler's younger daughter, Margaret, also known as Ulrica, survived after having been carried off from the Satichaura Ghat by a sowar. At the time, a story circulated that she had killed the sower and several members of his family and committed suicide to preserve her honour; this was used as propaganda in the British press. G. O. Trevelyan advanced another theory in 1866, writing that the rumour of suicide had been started by the sowar himself and that Margaret had died a natural death in Nepal after being taken from camping-ground to camping-ground by her captors. Another account relates that, fifty years after the mutiny, a missionary doctor and Roman Catholic priest were called upon to attend a dying woman, who, "speaking cultured English", claimed to be Miss Wheeler and to have married the Indian who saved her life.

== Bibliography ==
- P.C. Gupta 1963 Nana Sahib and the rising at Cawnpore. Oxford: Clarendon Press.
- V.C.P. Hodson 1945 List of the Officers of the Bengal Army 1758–1834, vol. 3. London: Constable and Co. Ltd.
- V.C.P. Hodson 1947 List of the Officers of the Bengal Army 1758–1834, vol. 4. London: Constable and Co. Ltd.
- T. R. Moreman 2004 (online edition 2008) Wheeler, Sir Hugh Massy (1789–1857). Oxford Dictionary of National Biography. Oxford: Oxford University Press.
- M. Thomson 1995 [1859] The Story of Cawnpore: the Indian Mutiny 1857. Brighton: Tom Donovan.
- G. O. Trevelyan 1866 Cawnpore. London and Cambridge: MacMillan and Co.
- Z. Yalland 1987 Traders and Nabobs: the British in Cawnpore 1765–1857. Salisbury: Michael Russell (Publishing) Ltd.
