= Cockburn Street, Edinburgh =

Thoroughfare in Edinburgh, Scotland

Coordinates: 55°57′02″N 3°11′21″W

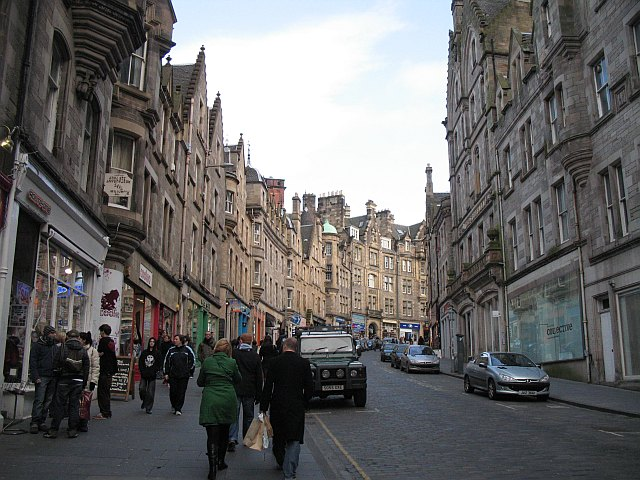
Cockburn Street

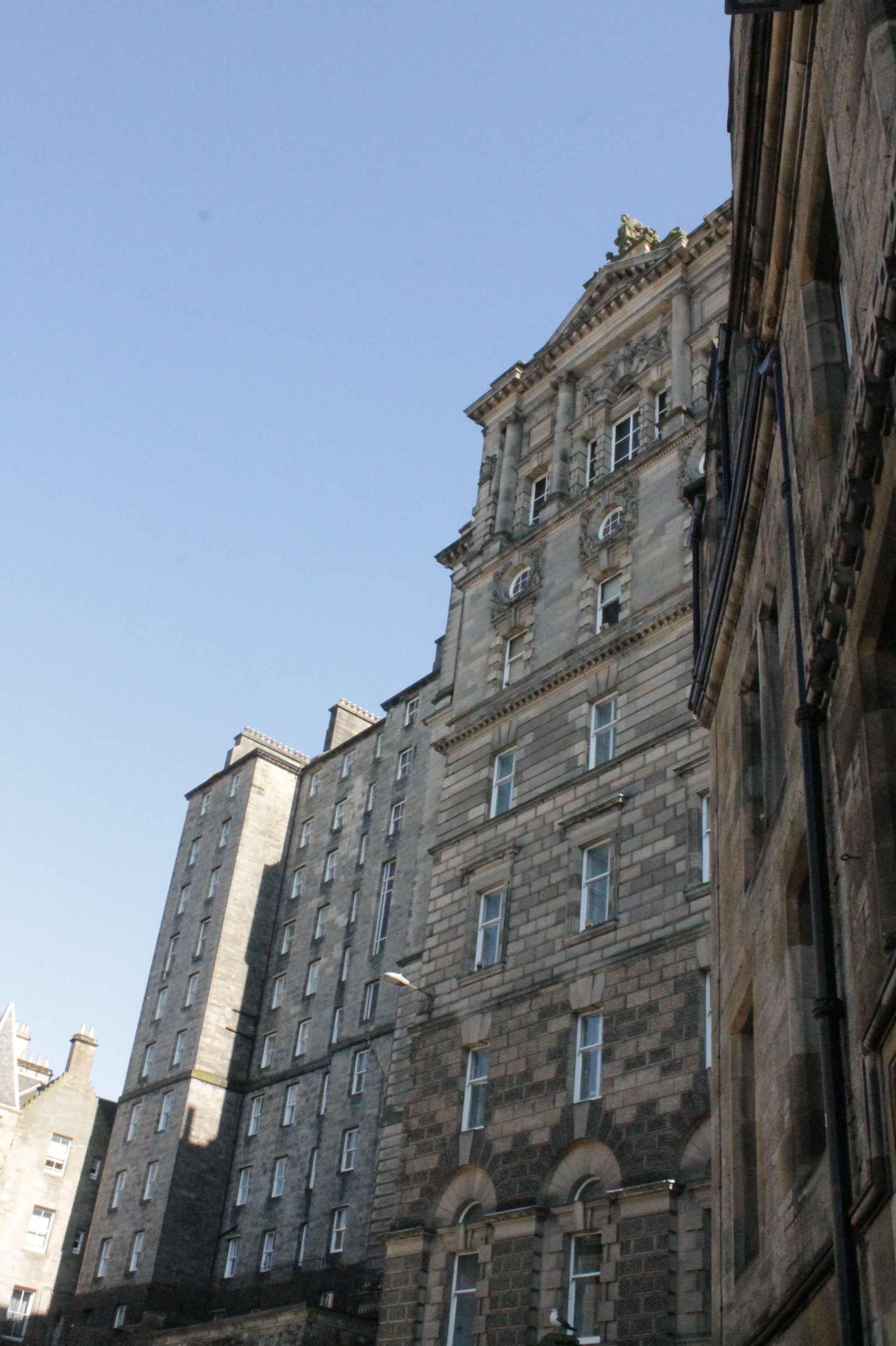
Edinburgh City Chambers from Cockburn Street

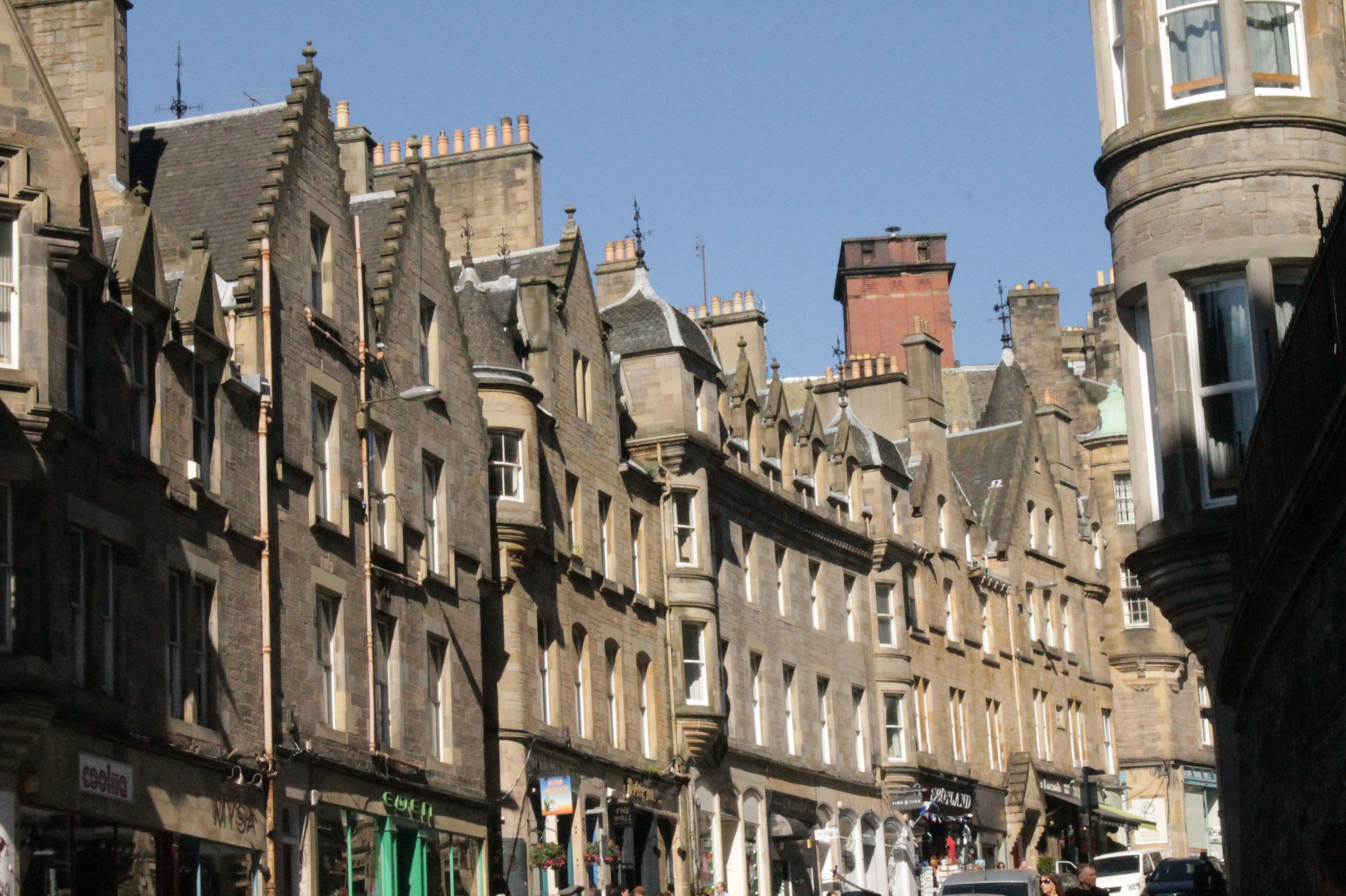
The upper north side of Cockburn Street

Cockburn Street (/ˈkoʊbərn/ KOH-bərn) is a street in Edinburgh's Old Town, created as a serpentine link from the High Street to Waverley Station in 1856. Originally named Lord Cockburn Street after the then recently deceased Scottish lawyer, judge and literary figure Henry, Lord Cockburn who was influential in urging his fellow citizens to remain vigilant in ensuring that early-Victorian expansion, e.g. improvements such as Cockburn Street, did not irrevocably damage or obliterate the built heritage and environment. Lord Cockburn's head is carved over the entrance to 1 Cockburn Street (the former Cockburn Hotel) which now serves as offices for the Edinburgh Military Tattoo. The street contains a series of small specialist shops.

== History ==
Edinburgh Railway Station Access Act 1853
- Act of Parliament
- Parliament of the United Kingdom
- Long title: An Act for making a Road or Street from the South End of Waverley Bridge Road, adjoining the General Railway Station at Princes Street, to the High Street in the City of Edinburgh.
- Citation: 16 & 17 Vict. c. xxxv

Dates
- Royal assent: 14 June 1853

Text of statute as originally enacted

Edinburgh Railway Station Access Amendment Act 1860
- Act of Parliament
- Parliament of the United Kingdom
- Long title: An Act to enable the Edinburgh Railway Station Access Company to raise additional Capital.
- Citation: 23 & 24 Vict. c. xxxvii

Dates
- Royal assent: 15 May 1860

Text of statute as originally enacted

The street was sliced through the previous medieval pattern of closes in order to give a more gentle gradient and wider thoroughfare to Waverley Station (opened in 1846 but then only accessible via narrow and steep lanes from the Royal Mile). The truncated ends of the closes were remodelled in the Scots Baronial style from 1859 to 1864. The majority of buildings are by the firm of Peddie & Kinnear. It was originally called Lord Cockburn Street but the "Lord" was abandoned within ten years.

The street is largely 4 storeys high but is dominated by the huge rear edifice of the City Chambers, which tower 12 storeys above the street as seen from this side. Given that the building dates from 1761, this is evidence to Edinburgh's fondness for high-rise structures dating back to the 18th century.

== Medieval remnants ==
All closes to north and south retain the medieval street pattern.

Most closes on the south side (leading to the Royal Mile) contain remnants from the 16th century. The most impressive are Warriston Close and Advocates Close.

Closes on the north side are generally 19th century.

== Notable features ==
One of the buildings on the north side has high level carvings of an owl and pussycat, linking to the then contemporary poem The Owl and the Pussycat by Edward Lear.

Several shops retain huge timber shutters which uniquely drop below ground level when the shops are open.

== Featured in film ==
The doorway, roofscape and top flats of 51 Cockburn Street appear prominently in the film Hallam Foe.

Scenes for the movie Avengers: Infinity War were filmed in the street in April 2017.

The chase seen between Mark and Begbie in Trainspotting 2 includes a sequence on Cockburn Street.
