= Monteath Mausoleum =

Landmark in the Scottish Borders

Coordinates: 55°32′01″N 2°36′55″W

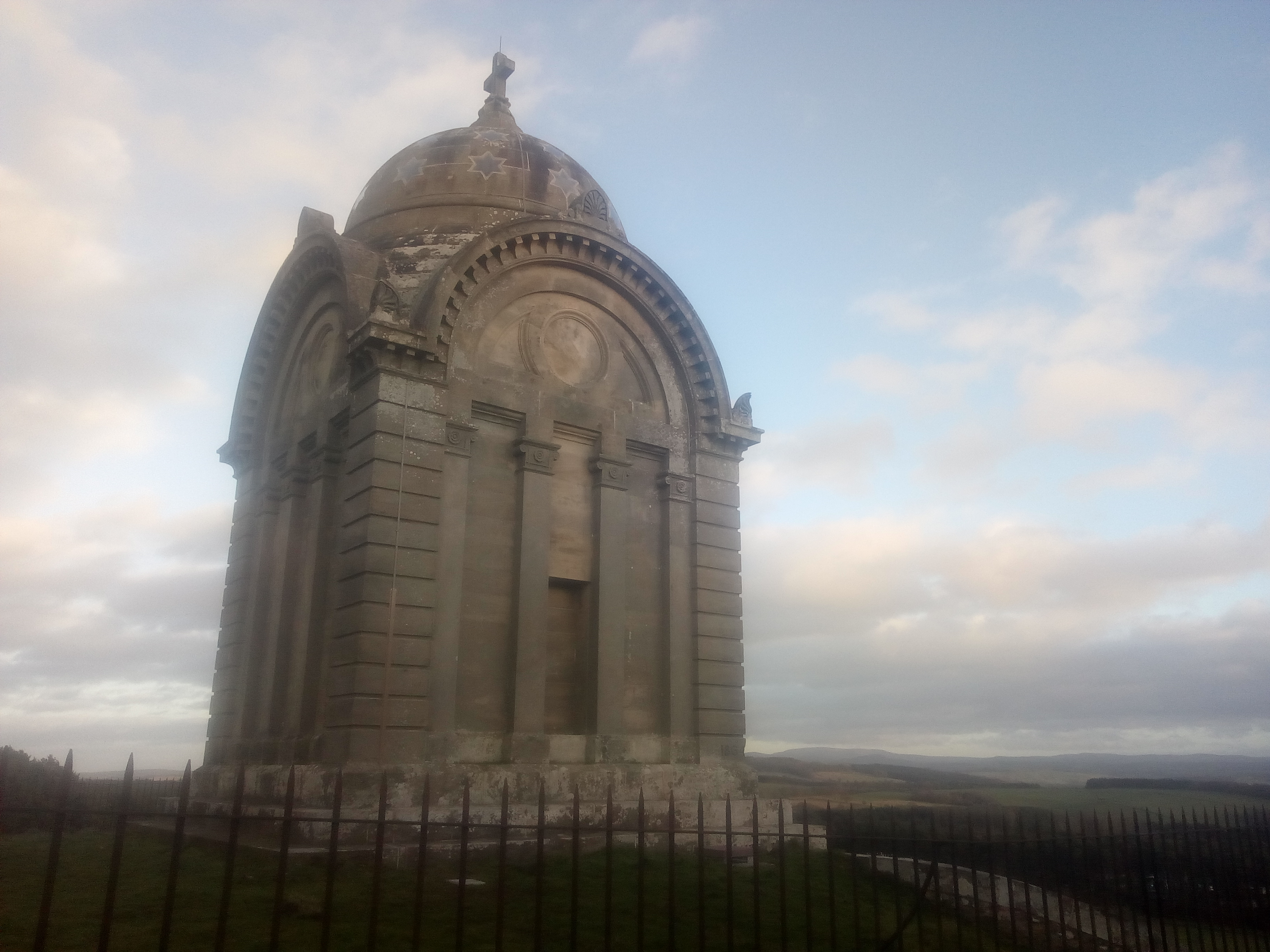
- the mausoleum in 2018

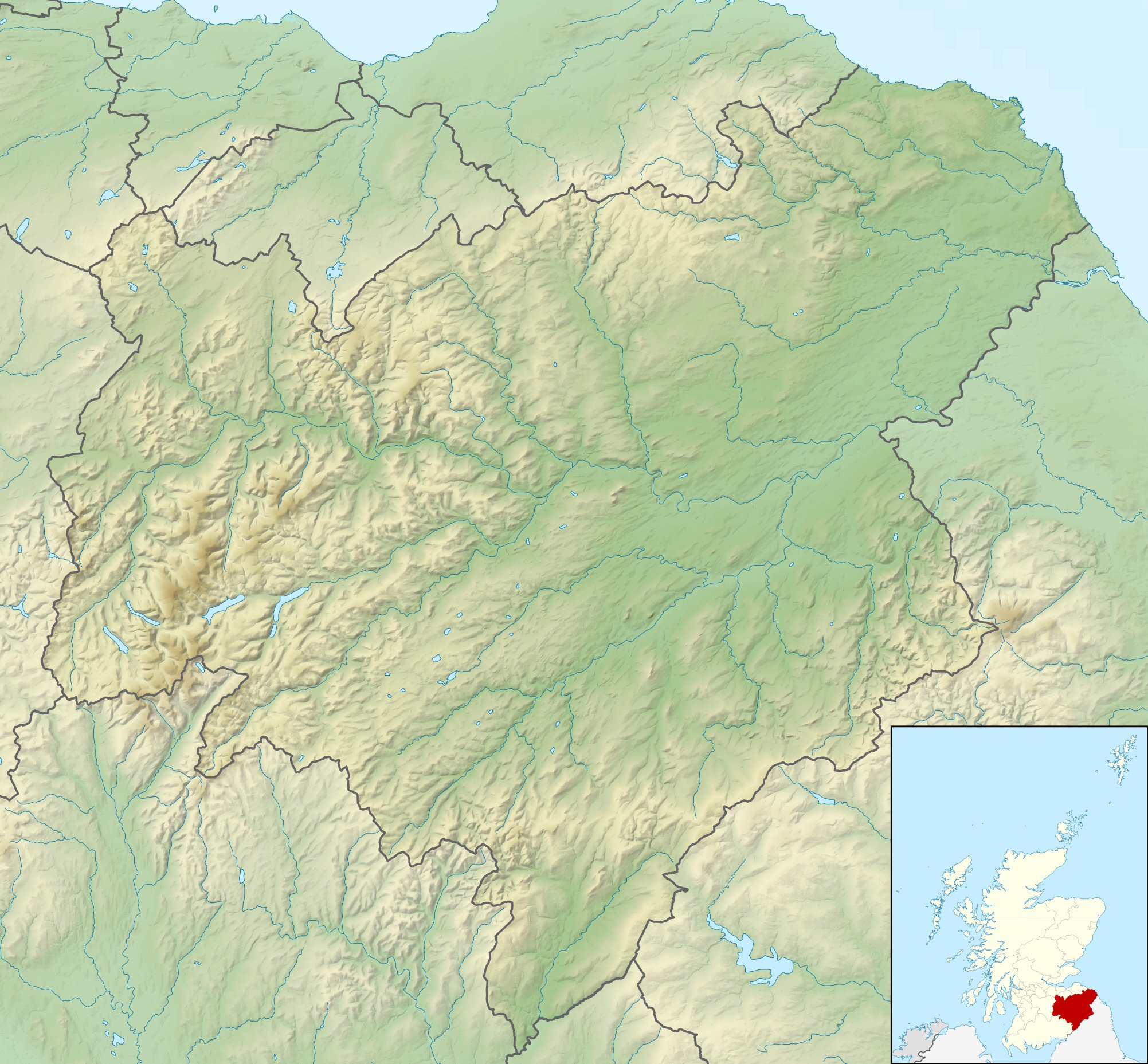
- Location within Scottish Borders

General information
- Status: at risk - being renovated
- Type: Mausoleum
- Architectural style: Neo-Byzantine
- Location: Ancrum near Jedburgh, UK
- Completed: 1864
- Renovated: 2018
- Renovation cost: £130,000
- Client: Sir Thomas Monteath Douglas
- Owner: unknown

Height
- Roof: Domed with glass star windows

Design and construction
- Architecture firm: Peddie & Kinnear

The Monteath Mausoleum is a large landmark in the Scottish Borders near the village of Ancrum. The listed building can be seen from the A68 road just north of Jedburgh. It was built in 1864 and renovated in 2018.

== History ==
General Sir Thomas Monteath Douglas commissioned this large mausoleum which was built on the hill named Gersit Law to the north of Jedburgh near Ancrum. The land belonged to his son-in-law Sir William Monteath Scott and overlooks the site of the Battle of Ancrum Moor.

The mausoleum was designed by the Edinburgh architects Peddie & Kinnear. The building is dated 1864 which is four years before Douglas died. They included a domed roof design similar to Dundas House in Edinburgh that was used by the Bank of Scotland. That later design also incorporated glass star-shaped roof lights.

In 2014 a group was supported to organise a renovation of the building which began in 2018. The renovation was completed in July 2019 thanks to grants and a 30 strong group of volunteers. The mausoleum is open to the public and a key to the crypt can be obtained.

== Description ==
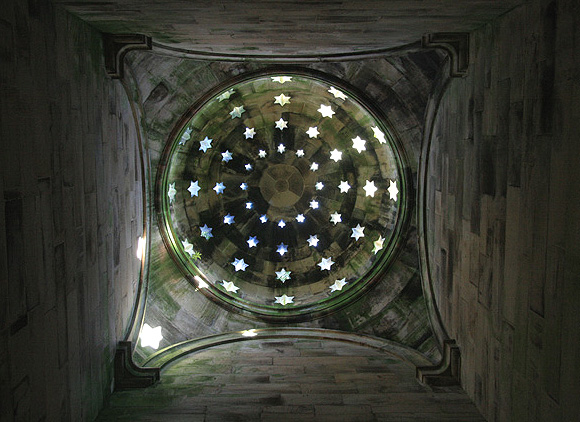
The domed roof of the Monteath Mausoleum

The mausoleum was to be sealed forever hiding the two angels who guard his tomb. The inside is lit by 48 green glass star-shaped lights in the domed roof. Outside two carved lions guard the entrance. one of the is sleeping and the other is awake. The building is constructed from ashlar sandstone.
