= Order of the Durrani Empire =

Order of the Durrani Empire (Nishan-i-Daulat-i-Durrani)
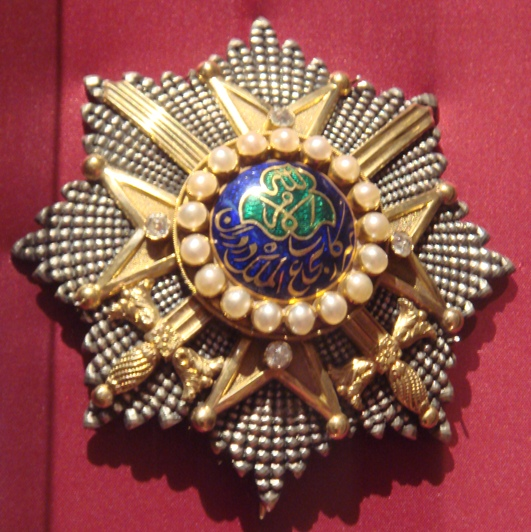
- 1st Class Star awarded to Sir Thomas Willshire in the Musée national de la Légion d'Honneur et des Ordres de Chevalerie, Paris

Awarded by Emir of Afghanistan
- Type: Order
- Established: 1839
- Eligibility: British field officers
- Awarded for: In gratitude for the restoration to the throne
- Status: Obsolete
- Founder: Shah Shujah Durrani
- Grades: Grand Cross; Grand Commander; Companion
- Ribbon of the order

The Order of the Durrani Empire (Nishan-i-Daulat-i-Durrani) was awarded to British field officers and above during the First Afghan War by Shah Shujah Durrani of Afghanistan in gratitude for his restoration to the throne.

The first investiture of the order was held at a grand durbar in the courtyard of the Harem Serai of the Bala Hissar, Kabul, on the evening of 17 September 1839. At the time there were not enough decorations prepared but on the day those who were not on duty were presented before the king. The result was that there are numerous variations in the stars and medals as many were subsequently made in India and Europe, particularly in the number of pearls on the order.

There were three classes to the order as to emulate the three classes of the Order of the Bath. The first and second classes had both a star and a medal while the third consisted of a medal only. The medal of all three classes had the red/green ribbon of the Ghuznee Medal.

== 1st Class ==
Medal: A gold Maltese cross with eight points terminating in a gold bead on two crossed swords. In the centre is a green flower on a blue enamel ground with the words "durr-i-durran" in Persian script, meaning "pearl of the age", the name attributed to the Durrani dynasty. The enamel centre is encircled by pearls.

Star: A silver star with a smaller Maltese cross in gold overlaid in the same style as the medal with the addition of a diamond on each arm of the gold cross. There are 17 pearls circling the enamel work.

== 2nd Class ==
Medal: As the 1st class but with 20 pearls encircling the centre.

Star: A silver star shaped like a Maltese cross with the gold medal overlaid as above but with 18 pearls.

== 3rd Class ==
Medal: As the 1st class but with 14 pearls encircling the centre.

== Recipients ==
This is not an exhaustive list

1st Class

1. Lieut. Col. Sir Alexander Burnes
2. Lieut. General Sir Willoughby Cotton
3. Lord Auckland
4. Lieut. General Sir John Keane
5. Sir William Hay Macnaghten
6. Lieut. Col. Sir Claude Martin Wade
7. Major General Sir Thomas Willshire

2nd Class

1. Lieut. Col. Robert Arnold
2. Lieut. Col. JG Beaumgardt
3. Major A Campbell
4. Major Patrick Craigie
5. Major William Garden
6. Lieut. Col. Keith
7. Lieut. Col. Macdonald
8. Major General Sir James Outram
9. Major General James Parsons
10. Major Alexander Peat
11. Major General Abraham Roberts
12. Major General Sir Robert Henry Sale
13. Lieut. Col. J Scott
14. Major General Edward Simpson
15. Lieut. Col. Stephenson
16. General Sir Joseph Thackwell
17. Lieut. Col. George Thomson
18. Major Elliot D'Arcy Todd
19. Lieut. Col. Hugh Wheeler

3rd Class

1. Major General Augustus Abbott
2. Major William Alexander
3. Captain William Anderson
4. Superintending Surgeon James Atkinson
5. Captain JDD Bean
6. Colonel David Birrell
7. Lieut. Col. Bulstrode Bygrave
8. Lieut. Col. Neil Campbell
9. Lieut. Col. Charles Carmichael Smyth
10. Lieut. Col. Richard Carruthers
11. Major General John Christie
12. Major CJ Connyngham
13. Captain Edward Barry Conolly
14. Lieut. Col. Croker
15. Lieut. Col. David Cuninghame
16. Lieut. Col. Charles Robert Cureton
17. Lieut. Col. Daly
18. Captain David Davidson
19. Lieut. Col. William Dennie
20. Major Deshon
21. Major General Thomas Douglas
22. Superintending Surgeon J Forsyth
23. Major J Fraser
24. Captain H Garbett
25. Major C Griffiths
26. Major Crawford Hagart
27. Major Henry Hancock
28. Major John Hay
29. Lieut. Col. John Herring
30. Captain Hugh Johnson
31. General Sir George St Patrick Lawrence
32. Major Robert Leech
33. Mr PB Lord
34. Lieutenant Frederick Mackeson
35. Lieut. Col. James Maclaren
36. Lieut. Col. McDowell
37. Lieut. Col. GHM McGregor
38. Captain James McGregor
39. Major Thomas McSherry
40. Colonel Thomas Monteath
41. Lieut. Col. Joseph Orchard
42. Lieut. Col. John Pennycuick
43. Lieut. Col. William Persse
44. Lieut. Col. Peter Pew
45. Major Edward Pottinger
46. Lieut. Col. Sir HC Rawlinson
47. Captain James Nathaniel Rind
48. Lieut. Col. Henry Salter
49. Captain Edward Sanders
50. Lieut. Col. Bentham Sandwith
51. General Sir Richmond Shakespeare
52. Lieut. Col. LR Stacy
53. Lieut. Col. Foster Stalker
54. Major Robert Thomas
55. Major John Thompson
56. Lieut. Col. Tronson
57. Captain Hamilton Wade
58. Captain A Wall
59. Major General George Warren
60. Lieut. Col. John Weston
61. Lieut. Col. CB Wheeler
62. Captain Foster Wheler
63. Colonel GP Wymer
64. Captain AGFJ Younghusband
