= Stonebyres Falls =

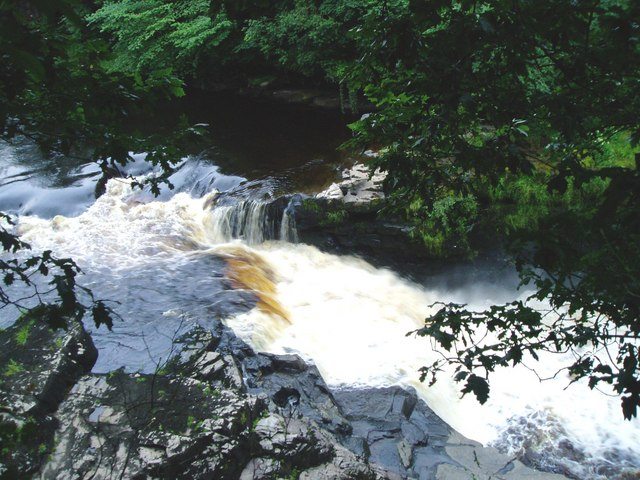
- A view of the falls from about 20mtrs above

- Location within Scotland
- Location: Stonebyres, South Lanarkshire, Scotland
- Coordinates: 55.67590°N 3.82548°W
- Watercourse: Clyde

Stonebyres Falls is a waterfall of the River Clyde in Scotland. It is located on the former Stonebyres estate at the site of Stonebyres Castle.

== See also ==
- Waterfalls of Scotland
