= Charles Kinnear =

British architect (1830–1894)

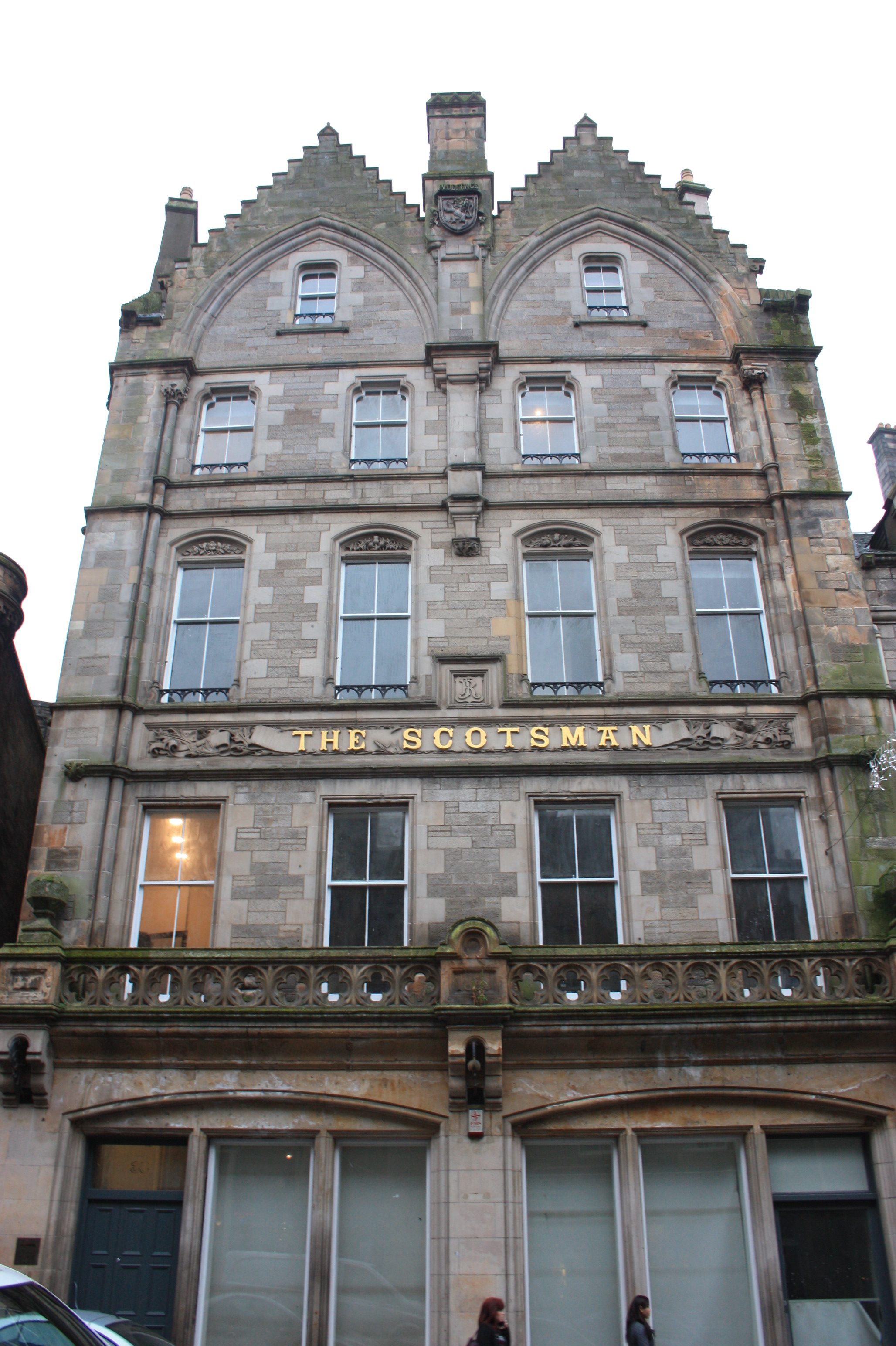
Scotsman Office 1860 by Peddie and Kinnear

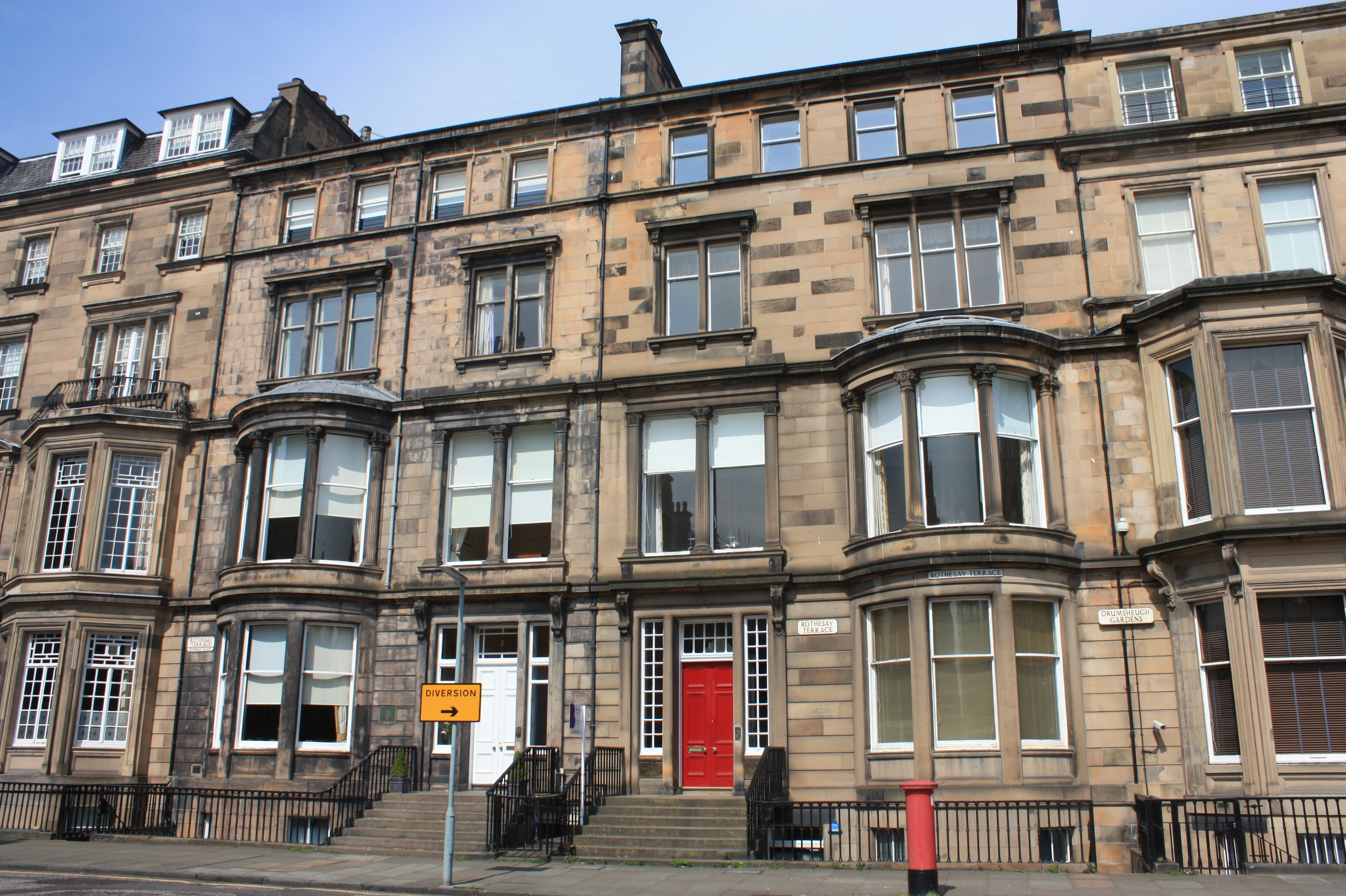
1–2 Rothesay Terrace, Edinburgh by Peddie and Kinnear

Charles George Hood Kinnear FRIBA ARSA FRSE (30 May 1830 – 5 November 1894) was one half of Peddie & Kinnear partnership, one of Scotland’s most renowned and prodigious architectural firms. They were noted for their development of the Scots Baronial style, typified by Cockburn Street in Edinburgh, which evokes a highly medieval atmosphere. Kinnear was also a pioneer photographer credited with inventing the bellows attachment on early cameras.

== Life ==
He was born in Kinloch House, near Collessie in Fife, the son of Christian Jane Greenshields, a rich heiress, and Charles Kinnear a banker in the family firm of Thomas Kinnear & Co. Kinnear can be presumed to have had a privileged life. For most of his early life he lived at 125 Princes Street in Edinburgh.

His elder brother, John Boyd Kinnear, was a politician.

After private schooling and a degree at the University of Edinburgh he trained as an architect under first William Burn then David Bryce, both based in Edinburgh.

In 1852, he inherited a large number of properties, reducing any immediate need to be employed. In 1853/4, he appears to have toured Sicily and Italy, and is known to have sketched in both Palermo and Pisa.

He was asked to join the rising John Dick Peddie as a partner in 1855, bringing an always-welcome large cash injection to the firm as a result. At the same time, he set up his own home at 12 Alva Street where he lived until death. Despite a second huge inheritance in 1856, he continued to work, clearly having a degree of love for it, rather than a financial need.

On the retiral of John Dick Peddie Kinnear went into partnership with Peddie’s son, John More Dick Peddie, placing his name to the front to create the lesser known firm of Kinnear & Peddie. They also employed Peddie’s fifth son, Walter Lockhart Dick Peddie (b.1865).

In 1893, he was elected a Fellow of the Royal Society of Edinburgh. His proposers were Sir Andrew Douglas Maclagan, Sir Arthur Mitchell, Alexander Crum Brown and A Gillies Smith.

Kinnear lived in a large Victorian townhouse at 12 Grosvenor Crescent in Edinburgh's West End. The street was designed by Kinnear's rival, John Chesser. John Menzies, the newsagent magnate was his neighbour.

== Photography ==
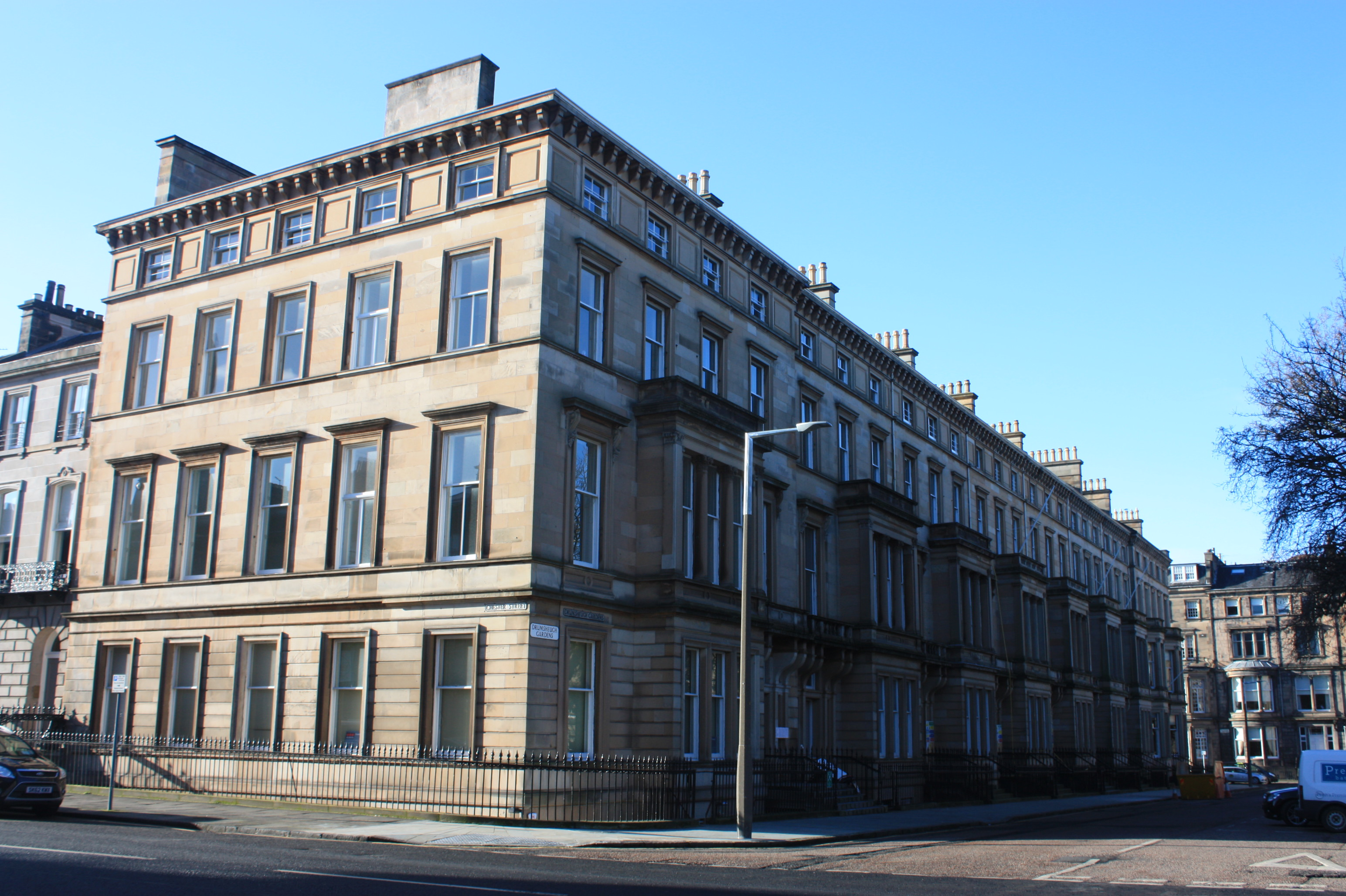
The west side of Drumsheugh Gardens, Edinburgh

In 1856, together with David Bryce, David MacGibbon and Sir David Brewster, Kinnear was a founding member of the Photographic Society of Scotland, acting as Secretary during Brewster’s Presidency. He made a photographic study of Milan in the same year.

In 1857, he contracted a Mr Bell of Potterow, Edinburgh to create a new camera, which is said to be the first use of a customised bellows, allowing complete darkness whilst comfortably adjusting the focal plane. He used this new camera on a study tour of Germany and northern France.

== Military career ==
In 1859, he joined the First Midlothian County (Midlothian Coast) Artillery Volunteer Brigade (at that time an equivalent to today’s Territorial Army) as a junior officer. He was commissioned as a lieutenant in July 1860 and in 1861 became Captain of the Portobello battalion.

After rising to become Major Kinnear, he was one of the three majors who personally financed the Regimental Headquarters on Grindlay Street in 1866.

== Death and legacy ==
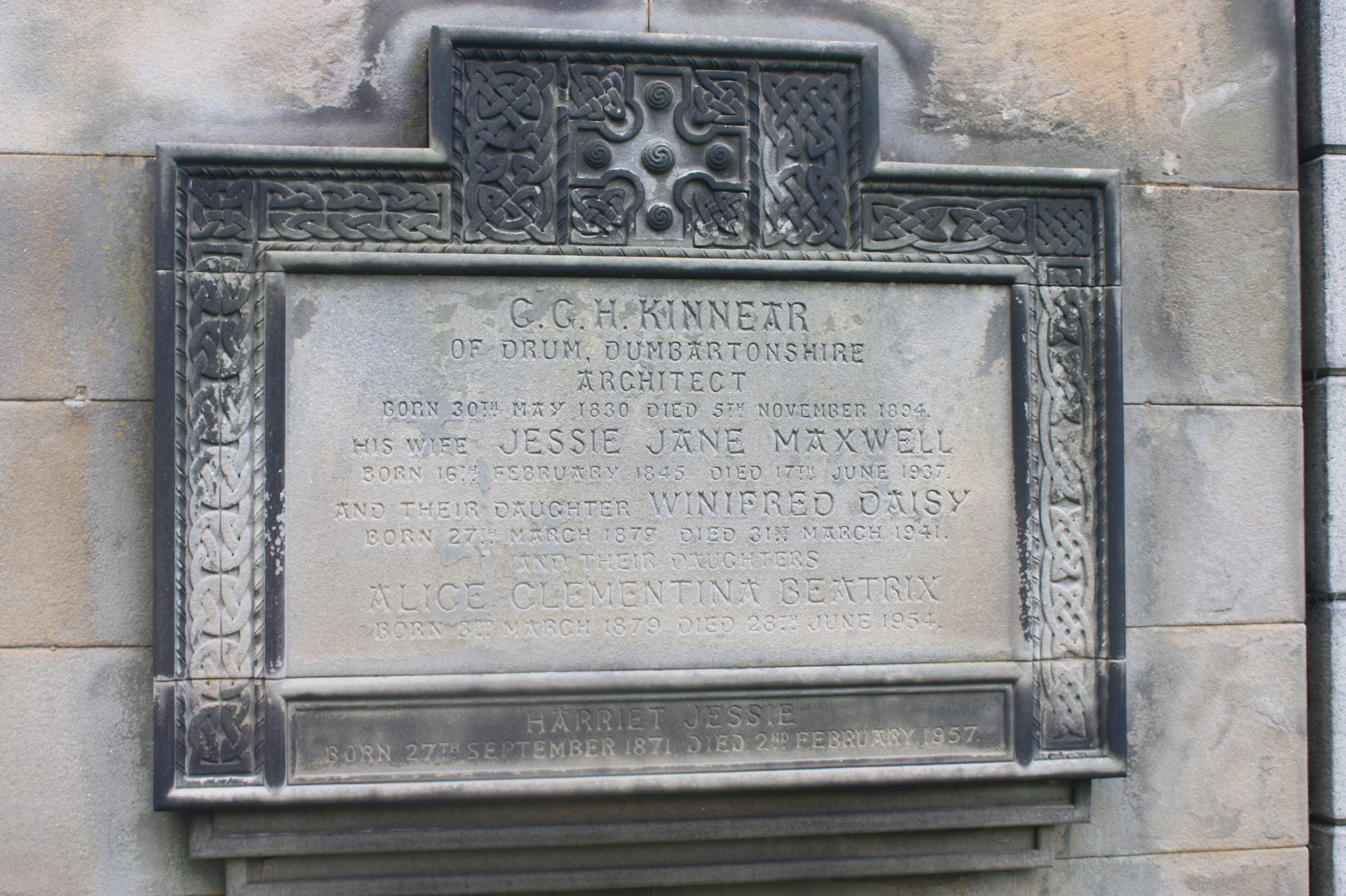
The grave of Charles Kinnear, Dean Cemetery, Edinburgh

He died suddenly of a heart attack after a normal day at the office in November 1894 and was buried against the north wall in the northern extension to the original Dean Cemetery. Unusually for an architect, he was given a full military funeral. He is buried with his wife, Jessie Jane Maxwell (1845-1931) and three daughters. The grave lies against the northern outer wall, towards the north-west. It lies not far from his business partner, John More Dick Peddie, who lies on the southern wall of the same section.

Although his estate was large, a high proportion went to pay off the debts of his brother John.

His son Charles Maxwell Kinnear became a tobacco manufacturer and the younger son, Norman Boyd Kinnear, a keen ornithologist, went on to become Director of the British Museum in 1947.

== Works ==
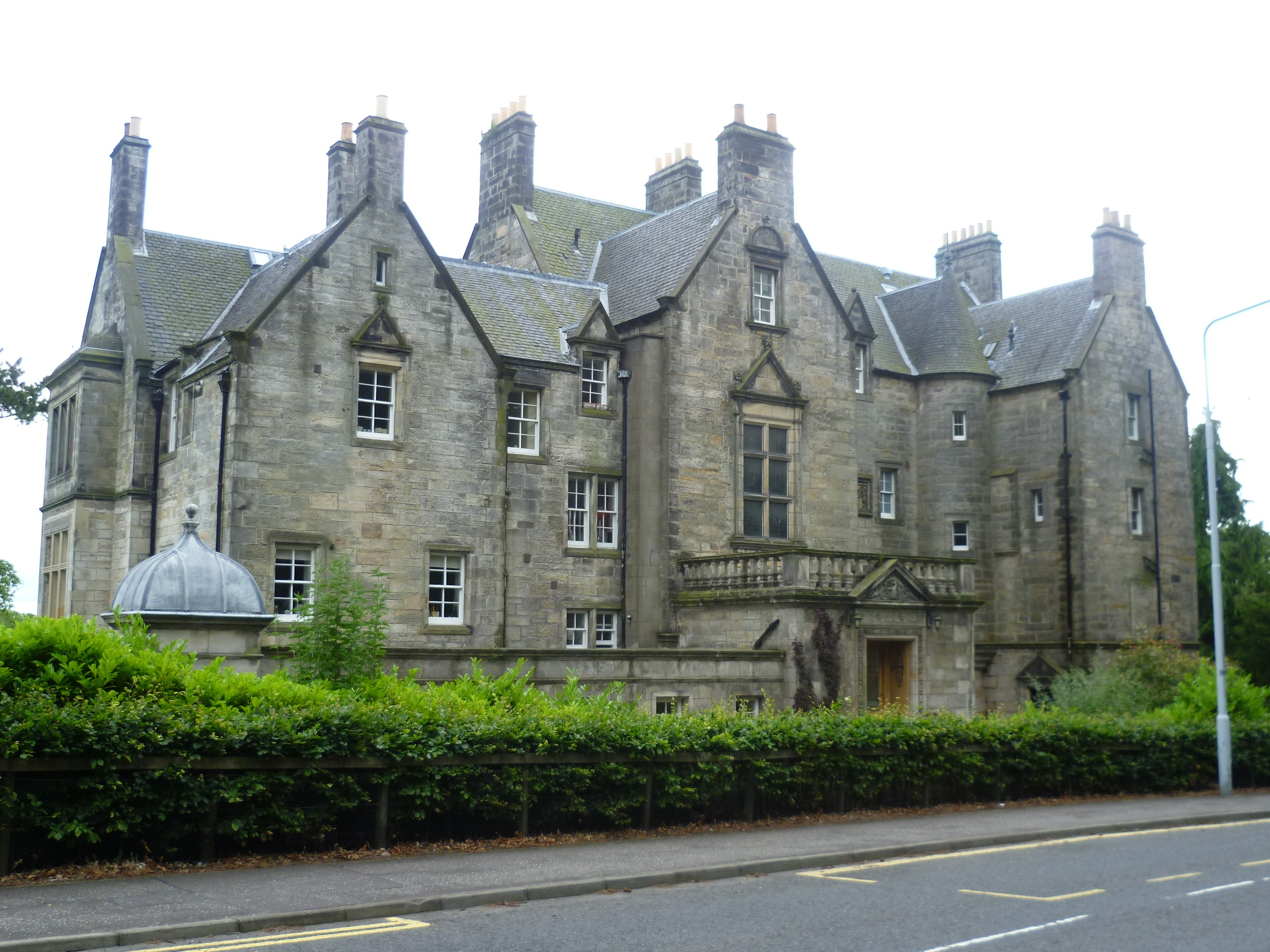
Pitreavie Castle by Kinnear & Peddie

As part of Peddie & Kinnear, Charles’ output was huge. He is known to have contributed the historical aspect of the designs. They did many banks and churches but are best remembered in Edinburgh for Cockburn Street: a specific town planning exercise, creating a serpentine link down from the Royal Mile to improve access to Waverley Station.

=== As Kinnear & Peddie ===
See.

- Monteath Mausoleum (1864)
- Terrace, 1-37 Drumsheugh Gardens, Edinburgh (1879)
- 30-34 Palmerston Place, Edinburgh (1879)
- Callander Hydropathic (1879) (funded by John Dick Peddie)
- Completion of Chalmers Street in Edinburgh (1879)
- Longmore Hospital for Incurables (asylum) (1879) now Longmore House, home to Historic Scotland (extended by Kinnear in 1891)
- 94 George Street, Edinburgh (1880)
- Kirkintilloch Church and manse (1881)
- Sunbury Mews, Edinburgh (1881) built as stables
- Extra floors and ornamentation, 2-8 Cockburn Street Edinburgh (1882)
- Kirkcudbright Railway Station (1882)
- Lodge house, Newington Cemetery (1883)
- Rebuilding of Cortachy Castle following a major fire (1883)
- Mosswater Cottages, Fife (1884)
- Remodelling of Pitreavie Castle plus new stables and gate lodge (1884-6)
- Sandgate Street and Foul Ford in Berwick-upon-Tweed (1884)
- Royal Bank and tenement over, Campbeltown (1885)
- Villa at 6 Ravelston Park, Edinburgh (1885)
- Slogarie House and attached Cottages, Kirkcudbrightshire (1886)
- British Linen Bank, Dunfermline (1887)
- Feuing of streets for housing, Craiglockhart, Edinburgh (1887)
- Four villas on Morningside Drive, Edinburgh (1887)
- Reconstruction of Kinglassie Parish Church (1887)
- Lochmaddy Combination Poorhouse, North Uist (1887)
- British Linen Bank, Clydebank (1888)
- Southwick Parish Church, Kirkcudbrightshire (1889-90)
- Reredos, St John’s Episcopal Church, Princes Street, Edinburgh (1890)
- Caledonian Railway Station, Lothian Road Edinburgh (1890-3) demolished
- Caputh Fountain, Caputh, Perthshire (1890)
- Pitlochry Public Library (alterations), Perthshire (1890)
- Mission Hall, Ellon, Aberdeenshire (1890)
- North Berwick Golf Clubhouse (1890)
- Niddrie Mains School, Edinburgh (1890)
- British Linen Bank, Greenock (1891)
- British Linen Bank, Coldstream, Berwickshire (1891)
- British Linen Bank, Alexandria, West Dunbartonshire (1893)
- Dalton Parish Church (1893)

=== Sole works ===
- Mosswater Farmhouse and Steading, Fife (1852)
- Kinnear Farmhouse and Steading, Fife (1853)
- Valley Cemetery, Old Town, Stirling (1857)
- Stoneykirk Parish Church (1859)
- Tenement, 64-70 Great Junction Street, Leith (1859)
- Remodelling of his family seat, Kinloch House near Collessie (1880)
- Office at 94 George Street, Edinburgh (1880)
