= 1620s in England =

Events from the 1620s in England. This decade sees a change of monarch.

== Incumbents ==
- Monarch – James I (until 27 March 1625), then Charles I

== Events ==
- 1620
  - 27 April – treaty with Spain arranges marriage between the Prince of Wales and Infanta Maria Anna of Spain in return for relaxation of laws concerning Roman Catholics.
  - 3 July – Captain Andrew Shilling, on behalf of the Honourable East India Company, lays claim to Table Bay in Africa.
  - 15 July – the armed merchant ship Mayflower embarks about 65 emigrants for New England at or near her home port of Rotherhithe on the Thames east of London.
  - c. 19 July – the Mayflower anchors in Southampton Water to rendezvous with the Speedwell which on 22 July (1 August NS) sets out from Delfshaven carrying English separatist Puritans from Leiden, arriving on 26 July. On or about 5 August the ships set sail, but the Speedwell is found to be leaking.
  - 12 or 13 August – the Mayflower and Speedwell put into Dartmouth, Devon, for repairs to the Speedwell.
  - 23 August – the Mayflower and Speedwell set out from Dartmouth; they are well out into the Atlantic when the Speedwell is again found to be leaking.
  - 28 August – the Mayflower and Speedwell return again to England, anchoring off Plymouth in the Cattewater; the latter ship is given up as a participant in the voyage and on 2 September departs for London, with most of her passengers and stores having been transferred to the Mayflower.
  - 6 September (16 September NS) – the Mayflower leaves Plymouth carrying the Pilgrims to Cape Cod in North America, where they land on 11 November. She carries 41 "saints" (English separatists largely from Holland), 40 "strangers" (largely secular planters from London), 23 servants and hired workers, and c. 30 crew.
  - Publication of Novum Organum by Francis Bacon.
  - Cornelius Drebbel demonstrates the first navigable submarine in the River Thames; his third is first demonstrated on 12 September 1624.
  - A severe frost freezes the Thames.
- 1621
  - 16 January – the Parliament of England sits for the first time since 1614.
  - 3 May – Francis Bacon is imprisoned in the Tower of London on charges of corruption; he is pardoned by King James I later in the year.
  - 4 July – 70-year-old James Ley, 1st Earl of Marlborough, marries 17-year-old Jane Boteler, niece of George Villiers, 1st Duke of Buckingham as his second wife.
  - 24 July – while hunting at Bramshill, George Abbot, Archbishop of Canterbury, accidentally kills a keeper with his crossbow. A royal commission of inquiry narrowly finds in his favour.
  - 22 November – poet John Donne is installed as Dean of St Paul's Cathedral in London.
  - 18 December – the House of Commons protests against the King's right to imprison Members of Parliament who criticise his foreign policy.
  - 27 December – Sir Edward Coke is imprisoned for his part in the Protestation.
  - 30 December – King James tears the page bearing the Protestation from the House of Commons Journal.
  - Spring–October (approx.) – Corante: or, Newes from Italy, Germany, Hungarie, Spaine and France, one of the first English language newspapers (translated from the Dutch), circulates in London.
  - Francis Mitchell becomes the last British knight of the realm to be publicly degraded (stripped of his knighthood), after being found guilty of extorting money from licensees of his monopoly on the licensing of inns.
  - Dutch engineer Cornelius Vermuyden is appointed by the King to drain parkland around Windsor Castle and begins reclamation of Canvey Island.
  - The University of Oxford Botanic Garden, the oldest botanical garden in the British Isles, is founded as a physic garden by Henry Danvers, 1st Earl of Danby.
  - Robert Burton publishes his treatise The Anatomy of Melancholy.
- 1622
  - 6 January (probably) – the Banqueting House, Whitehall, is opened with a performance of Ben Jonson's The Masque of Augurs designed by the building's architect, Inigo Jones.
  - 7 January – John Pym arrested for criticizing the King in Parliament.
  - 8 February – King James I disbands Parliament.
  - 22 February – a patent is granted for Dud Dudley's process for smelting iron ore with coke.
  - 22 March – in the Jamestown massacre, Algonquian Indians kill 347 English settlers around Jamestown, Virginia (33% of the colony's population) and destroy the Henricus settlement.
  - 23 May – Nathaniel Butter begins publication in London of Newes from Most Parts of Christendom or Weekly News from Italy, Germany, Hungaria, Bohemia, the Palatinate, France and the Low Countries, one of the first regular English language newspapers.
  - 25 May – the East India Company ship Tryall sinks when it hits the Tryal Rocks reef off Australia. 94 out of the 143 crew die.
  - William Oughtred invents the slide rule.
  - William Burton's Description of Leicester Shire published.
  - Second part of Michael Drayton's Poly-Olbion published.
  - Sir Richard Hawkins' narrative of his adventures Voiage into the South Sea published.
- 1622–1624 – famine in east Lancashire.
- 1623
  - February – Amboyna massacre: English East India Company traders killed by agents of the Dutch East India Company.
  - May – the King's favourite, George Villiers, is made Duke of Buckingham.
  - 30 August – negotiations of the planned Spanish Match, the marriage of Charles, Prince of Wales to Maria Anna of Spain, break down.
  - 26 October – "Fatal Vespers": 95 people are killed when an upper floor of the French ambassador's house in Blackfriars, London, collapses under the weight of a congregation attending a mass.
  - Between 8 November and 5 December – publication in London of the "First Folio" (Mr. William Shakespeares Comedies, Histories, & Tragedies), a collection of 36 of the plays of Shakespeare (d. 1616), half of which have not previously been printed.
  - Medieval right of asylum abolished.
  - Building of the Inigo Jones-designed Queen's Chapel in Westminster begins.
- 1624
  - 12 February – Parliament assembles for the last time under James I's reign.
  - 2 March – Parliament passes a resolution that its elected members are not permitted simply to resign their seats of their own will.
  - 10 March – England declares war on Spain.
  - May – Parliament impeaches the Lord Treasurer, Lionel Cranfield, 1st Earl of Middlesex, on suspicion of taking bribes.
  - 25 May – Parliament passes the Statute of Monopolies.
  - 24 June – Virginia becomes an English Crown Colony.
  - 5–14 August – the King's Men perform Thomas Middleton's satire A Game at Chess at the Globe Theatre, London, until it is suppressed in view of its allusions to the Spanish Match.
  - August – the Company of Cutlers in Hallamshire begins to function as a trade guild of metalworkers based in Sheffield, having been incorporated by Act of Parliament.
  - 12 December – treaty with France arranges the marriage of the Prince of Wales to Princess Henrietta Maria of France.
  - The Latymer School and Latymer Upper School in London are founded by the bequest of Edward Latymer.
  - The 15-arch Berwick Bridge by James Burrell is opened to traffic.
- 1625
  - 27 March – Prince Charles Stuart becomes King Charles I of England upon the death of his father, James I, at Theobalds House.
  - 13 June – Marriage in person of King Charles I and the Catholic Henrietta Maria, Princess of France and Navarra, at Canterbury.
  - 18 June – The "Useless Parliament" refuses to vote Charles I the right to collect customs duties for his entire reign, seeking to restrict him to one year instead.
  - August
    - Over 40,000 killed by bubonic plague in London; court and Parliament temporarily moved to Oxford.
    - Barbary pirates enslave about 60 people from Mount's Bay in Cornwall.
  - 7 September – Treaty of Southampton makes an alliance between England and the Dutch Republic against Spain.
  - 8 October – Cádiz expedition: Admiral George Villiers' fleet sails from Plymouth for Cádiz.
  - 1–7 November – Cádiz expedition: English forces are decisively defeated by the Spanish and the expedition is abandoned.
  - 9 December – the Netherlands and England sign the Treaty of Den Haag.
  - An English colony is established in Barbados.
  - A very high tide occurs, the highest ever known in the Thames, and the sea walls in Kent, Essex and Lincolnshire are overthrown, with great desolation caused to the lands near the sea.
  - A house of correction is established at Shepton Mallet in Somerset; it will still be functioning as HM Prison Shepton Mallet until 2013.
- 1626
  - 2 February – Coronation of King Charles I (but not the Queen) in Westminster Abbey.
  - 6 February – Parliament meets, and refuses to grant funds to King Charles without redress of various grievances.
  - 15 June – King Charles dissolves Parliament after it refuses to grant him Tonnage and Poundage rights; imposes forced loans.
  - 26 June – King Charles expels Queen Henrietta Maria's French attendants from court.
  - Start of Western Rising of 1626–32: anti-enclosure riots in the royal forests of South West England.
  - Cornelius Vermuyden appointed by the King to drain Hatfield Chase.
  - Spa waters found at Scarborough, North Yorkshire, by Mrs Thomasin Farrer.
  - Little Gidding community formed by Nicholas Ferrar and his family.
- 1627

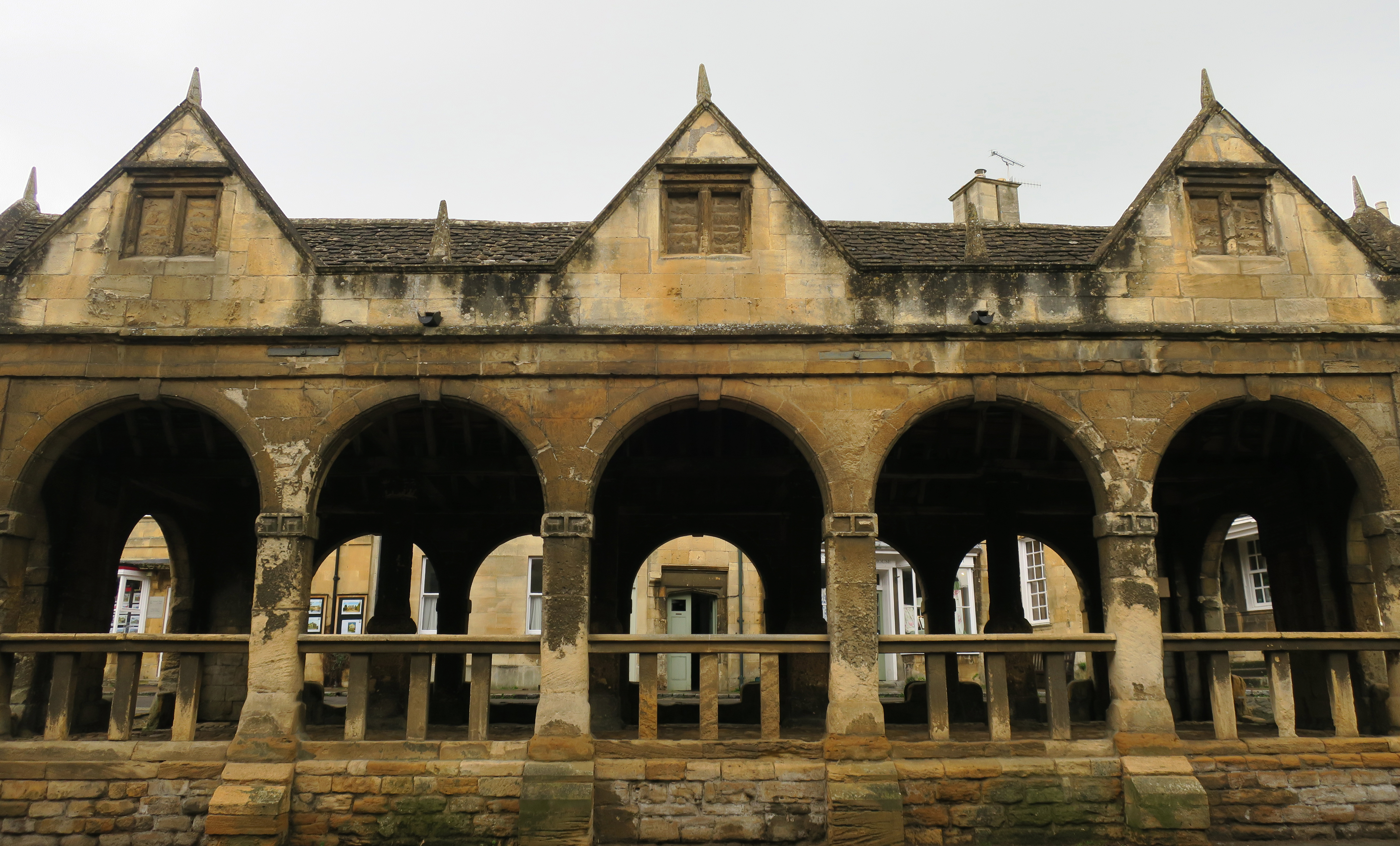
The Market Hall in Chipping Campden, built in 1627.

  - January – French ships are seized in the English Channel, resulting in an undeclared war with France.
  - 2 June – George Villiers, 1st Duke of Buckingham, leads an expedition to assist the Huguenots at the Siege of La Rochelle.
  - 8 November – Duke of Buckingham leaves La Rochelle, having lost half of his expeditionary force.
  - 28 November – Sir Thomas Darnell launches an unsuccessful appeal against his imprisonment without trial for refusing to pay forced loans; a major impetus for the Petition of Right the following year.
  - Barbary corsairs from the Republic of Salé begin a 5-year occupation of the Bristol Channel island of Lundy under the command of Dutch renegade Jan Janszoon.
  - Pitstone Windmill in Buckinghamshire known to exist; it will survive into the 21st century.
  - Francis Bacon's New Atlantis published posthumously.
- 1628
  - February – writs are issued by Charles I of England compelling every county in England (not just seaport towns) to pay ship tax by 1 March (1628).
  - 2 March – great fire of Banbury.
  - 17 March – Charles I reconvenes Parliament. Oliver Cromwell becomes an MP for the first time.
  - 7 June – Charles I forced to accept the Petition of Right, as a concession to gain his subsidies.
  - 23 August – disaffected Army officer John Felton assassinates George Villiers, 1st Duke of Buckingham at The Greyhound, Portsmouth. The Privy Council discusses a proposal to torture him on the rack but the judges unanimously declare its use to be contrary to English law, according to some authorities, and the Privy Council issues no further torture warrants. Felton is hanged at Tyburn on 29 November and his body sent back to Portsmouth for exhibition where, rather than becoming a lesson in disgrace as intended by the authorities, it is made an object of veneration.
  - December – Thomas Wentworth appointed President of the Council of the North.
  - Publication of Sir Edward Coke's Institutes of the Lawes of England begins with A Commentary upon Littleton.
  - William Harvey publishes his findings about blood circulation in Exercitatio Anatomica de Motu Cordis et Sanguinis in Animalibus (published in Frankfurt).
- 1629
  - 20 January – Parliament criticises the King for levying Tonnage and Poundage without its authority.
  - 11 February–19 June – around 350 English Puritans on six ships, led by Francis Higginson in the Lyon's Whelp, sail from Yarmouth, Isle of Wight, to Salem to settle in the Massachusetts Bay Colony in America as part of the Puritan migration to New England (1620–1640).
  - 2 March – Parliament criticises Archbishop William Laud's religious reforms.
  - 4 March – Massachusetts Bay Colony is granted a Royal Charter.
  - 10 March – the King dissolves Parliament and begins an 11-year Personal Rule.
  - March – Maldon grain riots begin: people in Essex led by "Captain" Ann Carter protest against food prices. The local magistracy lowers the corn price but the ringleader is executed.

== Births ==
- 1620
  - 3 February – Sir James Clavering, 1st Baronet, landowner (died 1702)
  - 23 February – Francis Newport, 1st Earl of Bradford, politician (died 1708)
  - 13 March – Alexander Seton, 1st Viscount of Kingston (died 1691)
  - 29 March – Edward Digges, barrister and Colonial Governor of Virginia (died 1674)
  - 15 April – Edward Villiers, politician and military officer (died 1689)
  - 18 April – Winston Churchill, noble and Cavalier soldier (died 1688)
  - 24 April – John Graunt, demographer (died 1674)
  - 25 May – Warwick Mohun, 2nd Baron Mohun of Okehampton, Member of Parliament (died 1665)
  - 6 June – Sir John Covert, 1st Baronet, politician (died 1679)
  - 11 June – John Moore, Lord Mayor and Member of Parliament for the City of London (died 1702)
  - 6 August – William Hiseland, soldier and reputed supercentenarian (died 1732)
  - 22 August – Alexander Rigby, politician (died 1694)
  - 24 August – Thomas Stucley, politician (died 1663)
  - 15 October – William Borlase, politician (died 1665)
  - 31 October – John Evelyn, diarist and writer (died 1706)
  - 2 November (bapt.) – Roger Pratt, gentleman architect (died 1684)
  - late November – Peregrine White, first English subject born in New England, aboard the Mayflower while anchored off Cape Cod (died 1704)
- 1621
  - 27 January – Thomas Willis, physician (died 1675)
  - 31 March – Andrew Marvell, poet (died 1678)
  - 23 April – William Penn, admiral (died 1670)
  - 22 July – Anthony Ashley-Cooper, 1st Earl of Shaftesbury, politician (died 1683)
  - 2 October (bapt.) – Hugh May, architect
  - 23 December
    - Edmund Berry Godfrey, magistrate (died 1678)
    - Heneage Finch, 1st Earl of Nottingham, Lord Chancellor (died 1682)
- 1623
  - 15 January – Algernon Sidney, political radical (executed 1683)
  - 27 May – Sir William Petty, scientist, philosopher and economist (died 1687)
  - 30 May – John Egerton, 2nd Earl of Bridgewater, politician (died 1686)
  - Margaret Cavendish, Duchess of Newcastle (died 1673)
  - Francis Talbot, 11th Earl of Shrewsbury (died 1668)
- 1624
  - July – George Fox, founder of the Quakers (died 1691)
  - 10 September – Thomas Sydenham, physician (died 1689)
- 1625
  - 25 May – Ann, Lady Fanshawe, née Harrison, memoirist (died 1680)
  - 23 June – John Fell, bishop and academic (died 1686)
  - 10 October – Arthur Gorges, courtier, naval captain, poet and translator (born 1569)
  - 11 December (bapt.) – Charles Hart, actor (died 1683)
- 1626
  - 12 March – John Aubrey, antiquary and writer (died 1697)
  - 28 September – Elizabeth Maitland, Duchess of Lauderdale, noblewoman (died 1698)
  - 4 October – Richard Cromwell, Lord Protector of England, Scotland and Ireland (died 1712)
- 1627
  - 15 February – Charles Morton, nonconformist minister and educator (died 1698 in New England)
  - 27 March – Sir Stephen Fox, statesman (died 1716)
  - 29 November – John Ray, biologist (died 1705)
  - John Flavel, dissenter (died 1691)
- 1628
  - 10 January – George Villiers, 2nd Duke of Buckingham, statesman (died 1687)
  - 20 January – Henry Cromwell, soldier, politician and lord lieutenant of Ireland (died 1674)
  - 25 April – Sir William Temple, 1st Baronet, statesman and essayist (died 1699)
  - 29 August – John Granville, 1st Earl of Bath, royalist statesman (died 1701)
  - 28 November – John Bunyan, writer and preacher (died 1688)
- 1629
  - 8 January – Sir William Hickman, 2nd Baronet, Member of the House of Commons of England (died 1682)
  - 5 February – Henry Muddiman, journalist and publisher (died 1692)
  - 10 March – Metcalfe Robinson, politician (died 1689)
  - 21 July – Elizabeth Claypole, daughter of Oliver Cromwell (died 1658)
  - 26 July – John Ferrers, politician (died 1680)
  - 6 August – Thomas Walcot, judge (died 1685)
  - 30 August – Matthew Wren, politician and writer (died 1672)
  - 3 September – Lady Mary Dering, composer (died 1704)
  - 10 September – John Heydon, neoplatonist occult philosopher (died 1667)
  - 21 September – Philip Howard, Roman Catholic Cardinal (died 1694)
  - 10 October – Richard Towneley, mathematician and astronomer (died 1707)
  - 11 December – Sir Baynham Throckmorton, 3rd Baronet, Member of Parliament (died 1681)
  - 23 December – Paul Rycaut, diplomat (died 1700)
  - Katherine Austen, diarist and poet (died c. 1683)

== Deaths ==
- 1620
  - 23 January – John Croke, judge and Speaker of the House of Commons (born 1553)
  - 1 March – Thomas Campion, poet and composer (born 1567)
  - 16 May – William Adams, navigator and samurai (born 1564)
- 1621
  - 3 May – Elizabeth Bacon, aristocrat (born c. 1541)
  - 2 July – Thomas Harriot, astronomer and mathematician (born c. 1560)
  - 25 September – Mary Sidney, writer, patroness and translator (born 1561)
  - 26 November – Ralph Agas, surveyor (born c. 1540)
  - Thomas Walkington, cleric and author
- 1622
  - 23 January – William Baffin, explorer (born 1584)
  - 31 January – Francis Norris, 1st Earl of Berkshire (born 1579)
  - 19 February – Sir Henry Savile, scholar, mathematician, Bible translator, MP and benefactor (born 1549)
  - 5 March (bur.) – Christopher Jones, ship's captain, master of the Mayflower (born c. 1570)
  - 17 April – Richard Hawkins, seaman (born c. 1562)
  - 1 July – William Parker, 4th Baron Monteagle, politician (born 1575)
  - October – Sir George Buck, antiquary, historian and MP (born 1560)
  - William Leighton, composer (born 1565)
- 1623
  - 8 February – Thomas Cecil, 1st Earl of Exeter, politician (born 1546)
  - 4 July – William Byrd, composer (born 1543)
  - 18 August – Samuel Sandys, politician (born 1560)
  - 21 October – William Wade, statesman and diplomat (born 1546)
  - 9 November – William Camden, historian (born 1551)
- 1624
  - 4 February – Thomas Humphrey, politician (born 1554)
  - 13 February – Stephen Gosson, satirist (born 1554)
  - 1 March – Thomas White, clergyman and benefactor (born c. 1550)
  - 12 May – John Rashleigh, merchant and politician (born 1554)
  - 31 May (bur.) – John Knewstub, Puritan (born 1544)
  - 7 September – Carew Reynell, politician (born 1563)
  - 5 November – James Wriothesley, Lord Wriothesley, politician, dies of fever while serving in the Eighty Years' War in the Low Countries (born 1605)
  - 10 November – Henry Wriothesley, 3rd Earl of Southampton, patron of the theatre, dies of fever while serving in the Eighty Years' War in the Low Countries (born 1573)
  - 14 December – Charles Howard, 1st Earl of Nottingham, statesman (born 1536)
  - 30 December – John Kendrick, cloth merchant (born 1573)
- 1625
  - Spring – Robert Cushman, Plymouth Colony settler (born 1577)
  - 27 March – King James VI and I, King of England, Scotland and Ireland (born 1566 in Scotland)
  - 5 June – Orlando Gibbons, composer and organist (born 1583)
  - 29 August (bur.) – John Fletcher, dramatist (born 1579)
  - September – Thomas Lodge, dramatist, writer and physician (born c. 1558)
  - c. October – John Florio, linguist and lexicographer (born 1553)
- 1626
  - 24 January – Samuel Argall, adventurer and naval officer (born 1580)
  - 20 February – John Dowland, composer and lutenist (born 1563)
  - 9 April – Francis Bacon, scientist, statesman and philosopher (born 1561)
  - 4 May – Arthur Lake, Bishop of Bath and Wells, bishop and Bible translator (born 1569)
  - 13 July – Robert Sidney, 1st Earl of Leicester, statesman (born 1563)
  - 25 September – Lancelot Andrewes, bishop and scholar (born 1555)
  - 25 November – Edward Alleyn, actor (born 1566)
  - 30 November – Thomas Weelkes, English composer (born 1576)
  - 8 December – John Davies, poet (born 1569)
  - 10 December – Edmund Gunter, mathematician (born 1581)
- 1627
  - 27 March – Sir John Suckling, politician (born 1569)
  - 19 April – Sir John Beaumont, poet (born 1583)
  - 27 June – Sir John Hayward, historian (born c. 1560)
  - 4 July (bur.) – Thomas Middleton, playwright (born 1580)
- 1628
  - 3 March – Edward Somerset, 4th Earl of Worcester (born c. 1550)
  - 12 March – John Bull, composer (born c. 1562)
  - 29 March – Tobias Matthew, Archbishop of York (born 1546)
  - 13 July – Robert Shirley, adventurer (born c. 1581)
  - 23 August – George Villiers, 1st Duke of Buckingham, statesman, assassinated (born 1592)
  - 30 September – Fulke Greville, 1st Baron Brooke, writer (born 1554)
- 1629
  - 23 March – Francis Fane, 1st Earl of Westmorland, politician (born c. 1580)
  - 25 March – John Guy, merchant adventurer and first Governor of Newfoundland (born 1568)
  - 27 March – George Carew, 1st Earl of Totnes, general and administrator (born 1555)
  - 30 May – "Captain" Ann Carter, activist leader, hanged
  - 22 September – Robert Radclyffe, 5th Earl of Sussex (born 1573)
