= 1630s in England =

Events from the 1630s in England.

== Incumbents ==
- Monarch – Charles I

== Events ==
- 1630
  - 8 April – Winthrop Fleet: The ship Arbella and three others set sail from the Solent with 400 passengers under the leadership of John Winthrop headed for the Massachusetts Bay Colony in America as part of the Puritan migration to New England (1620–1640); seven more, with another 300 aboard, follow in the next few weeks. The colonists begin to land at Salem in June and go on to found Boston.
  - June – Scottish-born Presbyterian Alexander Leighton is brought before Archbishop William Laud's Star Chamber court for publishing the seditious pamphlet An Appeale to the Parliament, or, Sions Plea Against the Prelacy (printed in the Netherlands, 1628). He is sentenced to be pilloried and whipped, have his ears cropped, one side of his nose slit, and his face branded with "SS" (for "sower of sedition"), to be imprisoned, and be degraded from holy orders.
  - Thomas Middleton's satirical comedy A Chaste Maid in Cheapside published posthumously.
  - The central square of Covent Garden in London is laid out and a market begins to develop there.
- 1631
  - 14 May – Mervyn Tuchet, 2nd Earl of Castlehaven, is beheaded on Tower Hill, London, and attainted for sodomy and for assisting in the rape of his wife following a leading case which admits the right of a spouse claiming to be injured to testify against her husband.
  - Poor harvest for second year in a row causes widespread social unrest.
  - Philip Massinger's play Believe as You List first performed.
  - Publication of the "Wicked Bible" by Robert Barker and Martin Lucas, the royal printers in London, an edition of the King James Version of the Bible in which a typesetting erratum leaves the seventh of the Ten Commandments (Exodus 20:14) with the word not omitted from the sentence "Thou shalt not commit adultery". Copies are withdrawn and about a year later the publishers are called to the Star Chamber, fined £300 and have their licence to print revoked.
- 1632
  - 15 June – Sir Francis Windebank is made chief Secretary of State.
  - 20 June – royal charter issued for the foundation of Maryland colony; Lord Baltimore appointed as the first governor.
  - July – portraitist Anthony van Dyck, newly returned to London, is knighted and granted a pension as principalle Paynter in ordinary to their majesties.
  - 17 October – the court of Star Chamber prohibits all "news books" because of complaints from Spanish and Austrian diplomats that coverage in England of the Thirty Years' War is unfair.
  - The Second Folio of William Shakespeare's plays published.
  - Publication of William Prynne's Histriomastix, an attack on the English Renaissance theatre.
- 1633
  - May – King Charles revives medieval forest laws to raise funds from fines.
  - 6 August – William Laud becomes Archbishop of Canterbury.
  - St Paul's, Covent Garden, designed by Inigo Jones in 1631 overlooking his piazza, opened to worship, the first wholly new church built in London since the English Reformation.
  - John Ford's play 'Tis Pity She's a Whore published.
  - Earliest surviving edition of the Christopher Marlowe play The Jew of Malta published, around 40 years after its first performance.
  - John Donne's collected Poems published posthumously.
- 1634
  - 22 January – William Davenant's comedy The Wits first performed by the King's Men at the Blackfriars Theatre, London.
  - 5 May – a royal proclamation confines flying of the Union Flag (the first recorded reference to it by this name) to the king's ships; English merchant vessels are to fly the flag of England.
  - 7 May – William Prynne sentenced by the Star Chamber to a £5,000 fine, life imprisonment, pillorying and the loss of part of his ears when his Histriomastix is viewed as an attack on King Charles I and Queen Henrietta Maria.
  - 20 October – King Charles I issues writs to raise ship money from coastal ports to finance the Royal Navy.
  - Red Maids' school is founded in Bristol from the bequest of local merchant and politician John Whitson. As Redmaids' High School it becomes the oldest surviving girls' school in England.
  - Cornelius Vermuyden begins the draining of The Fens to reclaim farmland.
  - First Newmarket Gold Cup horse race.
  - John Ford's history play Perkin Warbeck published.
  - Thomas Johnson begins publishing Mercurius Botanicus, including a list of indigenous British plants.
- 1635
  - 4 August – second writ for ship money is issued, extending the payments to inland towns.
  - Peter Paul Rubens paints the ceiling of the Banqueting House, Whitehall.
  - First secondary school established in the North American colonies, the English High and Latin School at Boston.
  - First General Post Office opens to the public, at Bishopsgate, London.
  - English settlers begin the colonisation of Connecticut.
- 1636
  - 3 March – a "great charter" to the University of Oxford establishes the Oxford University Press as the second of the privileged presses.
  - 8 September (OS) – New College founded at the English colony of Massachusetts; later renamed 'Harvard'.
  - 9 October – John Hampden refuses to pay ship money after a third writ is issued.
  - Completion of excavation of Old Bedford River (begun in 1630).
- 1637
  - 18 February – Eighty Years' War: Battle off Lizard Point: off the coast of Cornwall, a Spanish fleet intercepts an Anglo-Dutch merchant convoy of 44 vessels escorted by 6 warships, destroying or capturing 20 of them.
  - 30 April – King Charles issues a proclamation attempting to stem emigration to the North American colonies.
  - 27 June – English merchants led by captain John Weddell establish the first trading settlement at Canton.
  - 30 June – William Prynne is branded as a seditious libeller, and sentenced to pillorying and mutilation.
  - 13 October – First-rate ship of the line Sovereign of the Seas is launched at Woolwich Dockyard at a cost of £65,586, adorned from stern to bow with gilded carvings.
  - Member of Parliament John Hampden continues to refuse to pay ship money although a 7-5 majority verdict among a group of judges supports its legality.
- 1638
  - 18 April – flogging of John Lilburne for refusing to swear an oath when brought before the court of Star Chamber for distributing Puritan publications.
  - 12 June – trial of John Hampden for non-payment of ship money concludes.
  - 21 October – The Great Thunderstorm at Widecombe-in-the-Moor.
  - The Queen's House at Greenwich, designed by Inigo Jones in 1616 as the first major example of classical architecture in the country, is completed for Henrietta Maria.
  - John Milton's Lycidas published.
- 1639
  - 26 January – King Charles I raises (with difficulty) an army and begins to march north to fight the Scottish Covenanters in the First Bishops' War.
  - 27 February – Charles denounces the Covenanters.
  - 21 April – William Fiennes, 1st Viscount Saye and Sele and Robert Greville, 2nd Baron Brooke imprisoned for refusing to fight against the Covenanters.
  - 25 April – Charles issues a proclamation promising to pardon rebels.
  - 14 May – Charles issues a further proclamation promising to settle the Covenanters' grievances and not to invade Scotland.
  - 19 June – Treaty of Berwick signed between the King and the Covenanters, ending the First Bishops' War.
  - 15 September – Battle of the Downs between the Dutch and Spanish in English waters.
  - 24 November (4 December in Gregorian calendar) – Lancashire astronomers Jeremiah Horrocks and William Crabtree are the first and only scientific observers of a transit of Venus, predicted by Horrocks.

== Births ==
- 1630
  - 28 April – Charles Cotton, poet (died 1687)
  - 29 May – King Charles II of England (died 1685)
  - 1 August – Thomas Clifford, 1st Baron Clifford of Chudleigh, statesman (died 1673)
  - October – John Tillotson, Archbishop of Canterbury (died 1694)
  - 1 November – Richard Frankland, nonconformist (died 1698)
  - c. 1630/31 – Charles Paulet, 1st Duke of Bolton, politician (died 1699)
- 1631
  - 1 January – Katherine Philips, poet (died 1664)
  - 20 February – Thomas Osborne, 1st Duke of Leeds, statesman (died 1712)
  - 19 August – John Dryden, writer (died 1700)
  - 4 November – Mary, Princess Royal and Princess of Orange (died 1660)
  - 14 December – Lady Anne Finch Conway, philosopher (died 1679)
- 1632
  - 29 August – John Locke, philosopher (died 1704)
  - 20 October – Christopher Wren, architect, astronomer and mathematician (died 1723)
  - 17 December – Anthony Wood, antiquarian (died 1695)
- 1633
  - 23 February – Samuel Pepys, civil servant and diarist (died 1703)
  - 26 March – Mary Beale, portrait painter (died 1699)
  - 14 October – King James II of England (died 1701)
  - 11 November – George Savile, 1st Marquess of Halifax, writer and statesman (died 1695)
  - Sir Edward Seymour, 4th Baronet, politician (died 1708)
- 1635
  - 18 July – Robert Hooke, scientist (died 1703)
  - 22 November – Francis Willughby, biologist (died 1672)
  - 28 December – Princess Elizabeth of England (died 1650)
- 1636
  - 29 June – Thomas Hyde, orientalist (died 1703)
  - 29 September – Thomas Tenison, Archbishop of Canterbury (died 1715)
- 1637
  - March – Anne Hyde, first wife of King James II (died 1671)
  - 17 March – Princess Anne (died 1640)
- 1638
  - 24 January – Charles Sackville, 6th Earl of Dorset, poet and courtier (died 1706)
  - 6 May – Henry Capell, 1st Baron Capell, First Lord of the British Admiralty (died 1696)
  - 24 December – Ralph Montagu, 1st Duke of Montagu, diplomat (died 1709)
  - William Sacheverell, statesman (died 1691)
- 1639
  - 7 March – Charles Stewart, 3rd Duke of Richmond (died 1672)
  - c. April – Martin Lister, naturalist and physician (died 1712)
  - 8 July – Henry Stuart, Duke of Gloucester (died 1660)
  - 29 September – Lord William Russell, politician (died 1683)

== Deaths ==
- 1630
  - 26 January – Henry Briggs, mathematician (born 1556)
  - 12 February – Fynes Moryson, traveller and writer (born 1566)
  - 26 February – William Brade, composer (born 1560)
  - 10 April – William Herbert, 3rd Earl of Pembroke, courtier (born 1580)
  - 17 September – Thomas Lake, statesman (born 1567)
- 1631
  - 1 January – Thomas Hobson, carrier and origin of the phrase "Hobson's choice" (born 1544)
  - 7 February – Gabriel Harvey, writer (born c. 1552)
  - 31 March – John Donne, writer and prelate (born 1572)
  - 6 May – Robert Bruce Cotton, politician (born 1570)
  - 21 June – John Smith of Jamestown, soldier and colonist (born 1580)
  - 23 December – Michael Drayton, poet (born 1563)
- 1632
  - 22 June – James Whitelocke, judge (born 1570)
  - 23 August – Frances Carr, Countess of Somerset (born 1590)
  - 25 August – Thomas Dekker, dramatist (born c. 1572)
  - 27 November – John Eliot, statesman (born 1592)
- 1633
  - 1 March – George Herbert, poet and orator (born 1593)
  - 5 August – George Abbot, Archbishop of Canterbury (born 1562)
  - 10 August – Anthony Munday, writer (born 1553)
  - 8 October (bur.) – Robert Browne, religious reformer (born c. 1550)
  - 14 November – William Ames, philosopher (born 1576)
- 1634
  - 12 May – George Chapman, author (born c. 1559)
  - 25 June – John Marston, dramatist (born 1576)
  - 9 August – William Noy, jurist (born 1577)
  - 3 September – Edward Coke, colonial entrepreneur and jurist (born 1552)
  - 25 December – Lettice Knollys, noblewoman (born 1543)
- 1635
  - March – Thomas Randolph, poet (born 1605)
  - 27 March – Robert Naunton, politician (born 1563)
  - 14 November – Old Tom Parr, supposed oldest living man (allegedly born 1483)
  - 25 November – John Hall, physician and son-in-law of William Shakespeare (born 1575)
- 1636
  - 18 April – Julius Caesar, judge (born c. 1557)
  - Probable date – Sir Anthony Shirley, traveller (born 1565)
- 1637
  - 6 August – Ben Jonson, writer (born 1572)
  - 8 September – Robert Fludd, mystic (born 1574)
  - 4 December – Nicholas Ferrar, trader (born 1592)
- 1638
  - 14 September – John Harvard, clergyman and colonist (born 1607)
- 1639
  - January – Shackerley Marmion, dramatist (born 1603)
  - 7 November – Thomas Arundell, 1st Baron Arundell of Wardour, politician (born c. 1560)
