= 1622 in England =

- Centuries: 15th; 16th; 17th; 18th; 19th
- Decades: 1600s; 1610s; 1620s; 1630s; 1640s
- See also: Other events of 1622

Events from the year 1622 in England.

== Incumbents ==
- Monarch – James I
- Secretary of State – Robert Naunton
- Secretary of State – George Calvert
- Lord Keeper – John Williams
- Lord High Admiral of England – George Villiers, Marquess of Buckingham

== Events ==
- 6 January (probably) – the Banqueting House, Whitehall, is opened with a performance of Ben Jonson's The Masque of Augurs designed by the building's architect, Inigo Jones.
- 7 January – John Pym arrested for criticizing the King in Parliament.
- 8 February – King James I disbands Parliament.
- 22 February – a patent is granted for Dud Dudley's process for smelting iron ore with coke.
- 22 March – in the Jamestown massacre, Algonquian Indians kill 347 English settlers around Jamestown, Virginia (33% of the colony's population) and destroy the Henricus settlement.
- 22 April – Capture of Ormuz from the Portuguese by an Anglo-Persian force.
- 23 May – Nathaniel Butter begins publication in London of Newes from Most Parts of Christendom or Weekly News from Italy, Germany, Hungaria, Bohemia, the Palatinate, France and the Low Countries, one of the first regular English language newspapers.
- 25 May – the East India Company ship Tryall sinks when it hits the Tryal Rocks reef off Australia. 94 out of the 143 crew die.
- William Oughtred invents the slide rule.
- Boston Manor House is built in London by Dame Mary Reade.
- First record of bottled spring water in England at Holy Well, Malvern.
- Vicariate Apostolic of England (and Wales) is established.

== Literature ==
- Francis Bacon publishes his History of the Reign of King Henry VII
- William Burton's Description of Leicester Shire published.
- Second part of Michael Drayton's Poly-Olbion published.
- Sir Richard Hawkins' narrative of his adventures Voiage into the South Sea published.

== Births ==
- 3 January – Sir Humphrey Winch, 1st Baronet, MP (died 1703)
- 13 January – Thomas Dolman, politician (died 1697)
- 28 January – Richard Verney, 11th Baron Willoughby de Broke (died 1711)
- 4 March – Thomas Fox, lawyer and politician (died 1666)
- 23 April – Sir Arthur Onslow, 1st Baronet, politician (died 1688)
- 1 May – Sir Henry Goring, 2nd Baronet, politician (died 1702)
- 8 May – Capel Luckyn, MP (died 1680)
- 16 May (bapt.) – Elizabeth Killigrew, Viscountess Shannon, courtier and royal mistress (died 1680)
- 11 June – Samuel Fortrey, author (died 1681)
- 23 June – Sir Richard Cust, 1st Baronet, politician (died 1700)
- 24 June – Charles Worsley, soldier and politician (died 1656)
- 14 July – Sir William Armine, 2nd Baronet, politician (died 1658)
- 28 July – George Montagu, politician (died 1681)
- 19 August – James Compton, 3rd Earl of Northampton, politician (died 1681)
- 13 October – Sir Ralph Delaval, 1st Baronet, politician (died 1691)
- 29 December – Thomas Herle, politician (died 1681)
- Daniel Axtell, soldier of the English Civil War (died 1660)
- Thomas Baines, physician (died 1680)
- Robert Holmes, admiral (died 1692)
- Richard Rumbold, political radical (executed 1685 in Scotland)

== Deaths ==
- 23 January – William Baffin, explorer (born 1584)
- 31 January – Francis Norris, 1st Earl of Berkshire (born 1579)
- 19 February – Sir Henry Savile, scholar, mathematician, Bible translator, MP and benefactor (born 1549)
- 5 March (bur.) – Christopher Jones, ship's captain, master of the Mayflower (born c. 1570)
- 17 April – Richard Hawkins, seaman (born c. 1562)
- 1 July – William Parker, 4th Baron Monteagle, politician (born 1575)
- October – Sir George Buck, antiquary, historian and MP (born 1560)
- William Leighton, composer (born 1565)
