= 1764 in Great Britain =

Events from the year 1764 in Great Britain.

== Incumbents ==
- Monarch – George III
- Prime Minister – George Grenville (Whig)

== Events ==
- 19 January – John Wilkes is expelled from the House of Commons for seditious libel for his article criticising King George III in The North Briton; he is in exile in France.
- 5 April – Parliament passes the Sugar Act.
- 19 April – the Currency Act passed which prohibits the American colonies from issuing paper currency of any form.
- 23 April – Mozart family grand tour: 8-year-old W. A. Mozart settles in London for a year where he composes his Symphony No. 1.
- August – protests begin in Boston, Massachusetts against Britain's colonial policies.
- 22 October – deposed Nawab of Bengal Mir Qasim defeated at the Battle of Buxar by the British East India Company.

=== Undated ===
- Specific and latent heats are described by Joseph Black.
- Industrial Revolution: James Hargreaves invents the Spinning Jenny.
- Holkham Hall, Norfolk, completed in the Palladian style by William Kent.
- Landscape gardener Lancelot "Capability" Brown is appointed Chief Gardener at the royal palace of Hampton Court; redesigns the gardens of Blenheim Palace in Oxfordshire; and works at Broadlands in Hampshire.
- The rock pillar called "Lot's Wife" amongst The Needles off the Isle of Wight collapses into the sea during a storm.

== Publications ==
- James Ridley's pastiche Oriental stories The Tales of the Genii (supposedly translated by Sir Charles Morell from Persian).
- Horace Walpole's The Castle of Otranto, the first Gothic novel (supposedly translated by William Marshal from Italian).

== Births ==
- Early – James Smithson, mineralogist, chemist and benefactor (died 1829)
- February – George Duff, Scottish naval officer (died 1805)
- 13 March – Charles Grey, 2nd Earl Grey, Prime Minister of the United Kingdom (died 1845)
- 1 April – Eclipse, racehorse (died 1789)
- 3 April – John Abernethy, surgeon (died 1831)
- 29 April – Ann Hatton, née Kemble, novelist (died 1838)
- 2 May – Robert Hall, Baptist minister (died 1831)
- 4 May – Joseph Carpue, surgeon (died 1846)
- 5 May – Robert Craufurd, Scottish general (killed at Siege of Ciudad Rodrigo (1812))
- 25 May – John Mason Good, writer (died 1827)
- 19 June – Sir John Barrow, 1st Baronet, author and statesman (died 1848)
- 21 June – Sidney Smith, admiral (died 1840)
- 5 July – Daniel Mendoza, boxer (died 1836)
- 9 July – Ann Radcliffe, née Ward, novelist (died 1823)
- 27 July – John Thelwall, radical (died 1834)
- 17 September – John Goodricke, astronomer (died 1786)
- 25 September – Fletcher Christian, sailor and mutineer (died 1793 in Pitcairn Islands)
- October – William Symington, Scottish mechanical engineer and steamboat pioneer (died 1831)
- 3 December – Mary Lamb, writer and matricide (died 1847)
- Approximate date – Alexander Mackenzie, Scottish explorer of northern Canada (died 1820)

== Deaths ==
- 6 March – Philip Yorke, 1st Earl of Hardwicke, Lord Chancellor (born 1690)
- 17 March
  - William Oliver, physician (born 1695)
  - George Parker, 2nd Earl of Macclesfield, astronomer (born c. 1696)
- 15 April – John Immyns, attorney and lutenist (born c. 1700)
- 29 June – Ralph Allen, businessman and politician (born 1693)
- 7 July – William Pulteney, 1st Earl of Bath, politician (born 1683)
- 2 September – Nathaniel Bliss, Astronomer Royal (born 1700)
- 23 September – Robert Dodsley, writer (born 1703)
- 2 October – William Cavendish, 4th Duke of Devonshire, Prime Minister (born 1720)
- 26 October – William Hogarth, painter and satirist (born 1697)
- 4 November – Charles Churchill, poet and satirist (born 1732)

== See also ==
- 1764 in Wales
