= 1768 in Great Britain =

Events from the year 1768 in Great Britain.

== Incumbents ==
- Monarch – George III
- Prime Minister – William Pitt, 1st Earl of Chatham (Whig) (until 14 October); Augustus FitzRoy, 3rd Duke of Grafton (Whig) (starting 14 October)

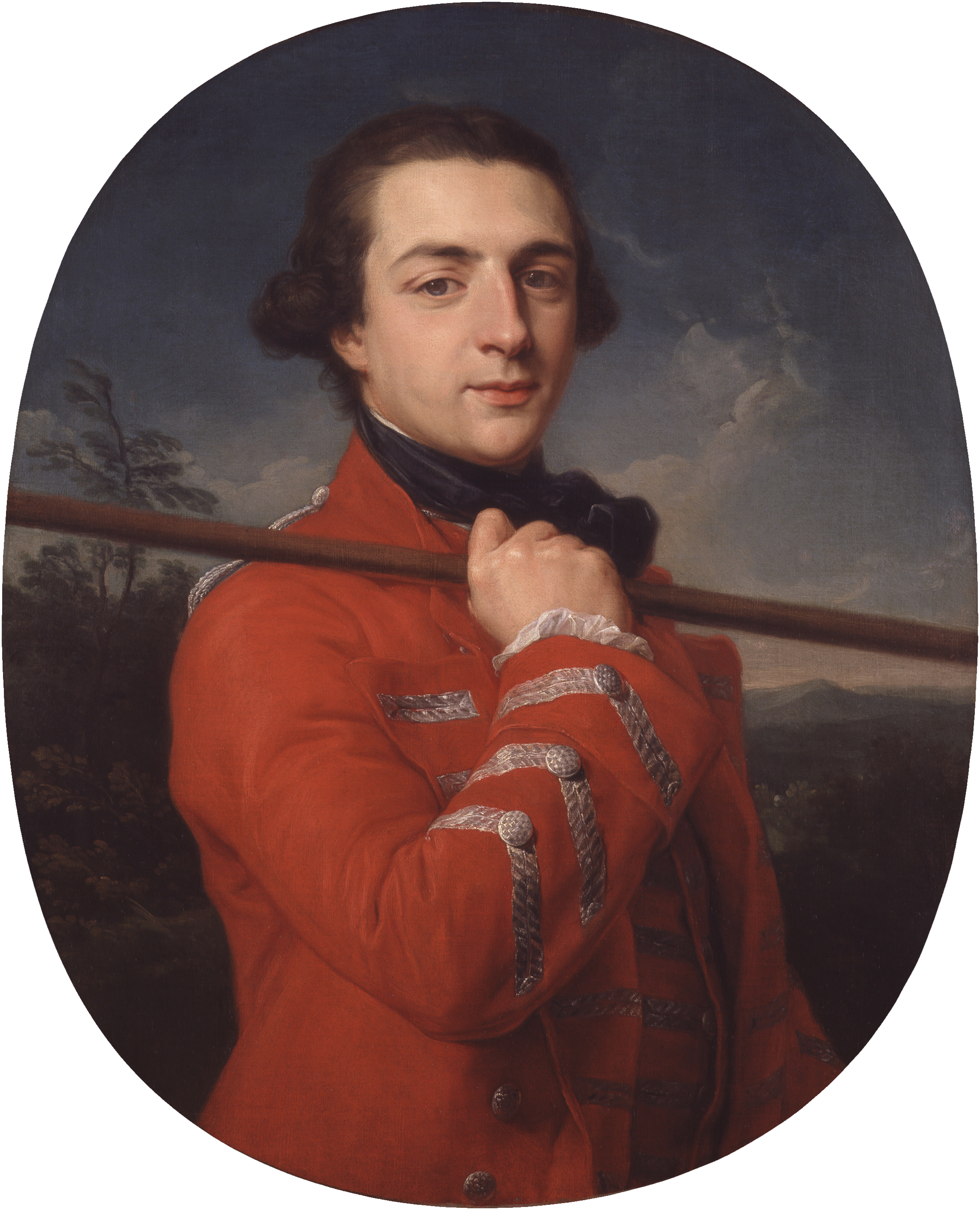
Augustus FitzRoy, 3rd Duke of Grafton

== Events ==
- 9 January – Philip Astley stages the first modern circus, with acrobats on galloping horses in London.
- 27 February – the first Secretary of State for the Colonies is appointed, the Earl of Hillsborough.
- March – general election; Whigs remain in power.
- 17 March
  - The Superintendent of Indian Affairs, Sir William Johnson, concludes a peace agreement with the leaders of the Six Nations of the Iroquois Confederacy (the Mohawk, Onondaga, Oneida, Cayuga, Seneca and Tuscarora tribal nations) of the northern American lands, and with Chiefs Oconostota and Attakullakulla of the Cherokee nation in the southern American lands.
  - William Cookworthy of Plymouth is granted a patent for the manufacture of true porcelain.
- 28 April – The Exhibition of 1768 is held at Spring Gardens in London by the Society of Artists, the last to be held before a major split in the membership that led to the creation of the Royal Academy in December.
- 10 May – John Wilkes is imprisoned for writing an article for The North Briton severely criticising King George III. This action provokes protesters to riot; in Southwark, troops fire on the mob, killing seven, the Massacre of St George's Fields.
- 26 August – James Cook departs from Plymouth aboard HMS Endeavour on his first voyage of discovery.
- September – first Birmingham Music Festival held.
- 22–29 September – The Massachusetts Convention of Towns, assembling in Boston, resolves on a written objection to the impending arrival of British troops rather than more militant action but causes panic in London.
- 14 October – Augustus FitzRoy, 3rd Duke of Grafton, succeeds William Pitt, 1st Earl of Chatham, as Prime Minister after Pitt's resignation due to ill health.
- 10 December – Royal Academy founded in London, with Joshua Reynolds as its first President.

=== Undated ===
- Citizens of Boston, Massachusetts, refuse to quarter British troops.
- Frederick Cornwallis enthroned as Archbishop of Canterbury.
- The Theatre Royal, Bath, and Theatre Royal, Norwich, assume these titles having been granted Royal Patents, making them officially England's only legal provincial patent theatres.
- Foundation of the Leeds Library, the oldest surviving subscription library of its type in Britain.
- Joseph Wright of Derby's painting An Experiment on a Bird in the Air Pump.

== Publications ==
- First of the weekly numbers of the Encyclopædia Britannica, edited by William Smellie, are published in Edinburgh (10 December); one hundred are planned.
- An Essay upon Prints, containing remarks upon the principles of picturesque beauty by William Gilpin.
- A Sentimental Journey Through France and Italy by Laurence Sterne.
- A Six Weeks Tour, through the southern counties of England and Wales by Arthur Young.
- The Complete Farmer: Or, a General Dictionary of Husbandry, by "A Society of Gentlemen", a group of members of the Society for the Encouragement of Arts, concludes publication in weekly numbers and first published in book form

== Births ==
- 22 March – Bryan Donkin, engineer and inventor (died 1855)
- 17 May
  - Caroline of Brunswick, queen of George IV (died 1821)
  - Henry Paget, 1st Marquess of Anglesey, general (died 1854)
- 9 June – Samuel Slater, "father of the American Industrial Revolution" (died 1835 in the United States)
- 23 August – Astley Cooper, surgeon and anatomist (died 1841)
- 29 August – John Fawcett, actor (died 1837)
- 24 September – Sharon Turner, historian (died 1847)
- 2 October – William Carr Beresford, 1st Viscount Beresford, general and politician (died 1854)

== Deaths ==
- 1 February – Sir Robert Rich, cavalry officer (born 1685)
- 2 February – Robert Smith, mathematician (born 1689)
- 8 February – George Dance the Elder, architect (born 1695)
- 17 February – Arthur Onslow, politician (born 1691)
- 18 March – Laurence Sterne, Irish-born English novelist (born 1713)
- 15 June – James Short, mathematician and optician (born 1710)
- 24 July – Nathanial Lardner, theologian (born 1684)
- 3 August – Thomas Secker, Archbishop of Canterbury (born 1693)
- 1 October – Robert Simson, mathematician (born 1687)
- 17 November – Thomas Pelham-Holles, 1st Duke of Newcastle-upon-Tyne, Prime Minister (born 1693)
- 26 November – Edward Stone, polymath (born 1702)
- date unknown – Mary Hervey (born 1700)

== See also ==
- 1768 in Wales
