= 1754 in Great Britain =

Events from the year 1754 in Great Britain.

== Incumbents ==
- Monarch – George II
- Prime Minister – Henry Pelham (Whig) (until 6 March); Thomas Pelham-Holles, 1st Duke of Newcastle (Whig) (starting 16 March)

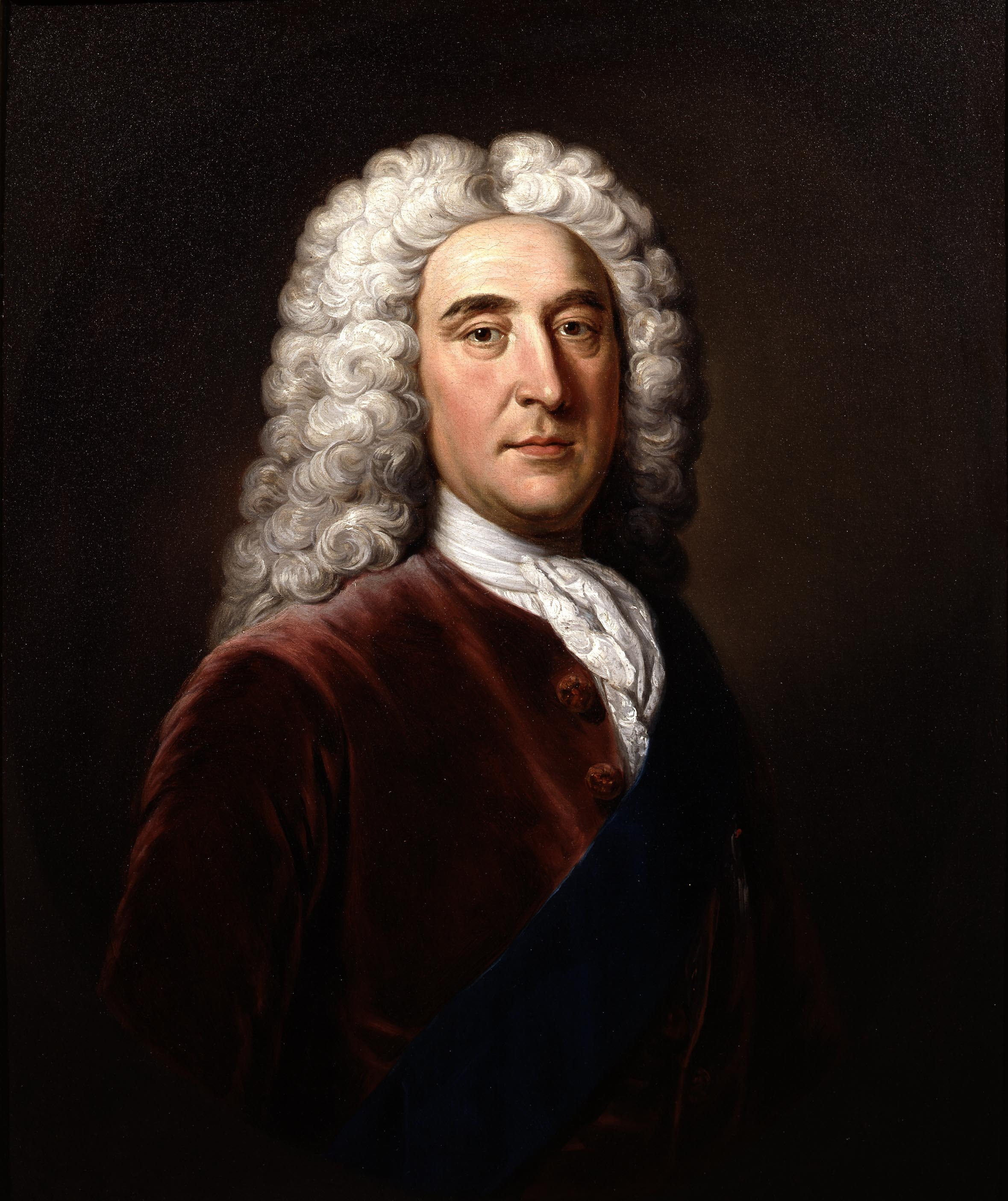
Thomas Pelham-Holles, 1st Duke of Newcastle

== Events ==
- 28 January – Horace Walpole, in a letter to Horace Mann, coins the word serendipity.
- 6 March – Thomas Pelham-Holles, 1st Duke of Newcastle-upon-Tyne becomes Prime Minister following the death of his brother Henry Pelham.
- 25 March – Lord Harwicke's Marriage Act 1753 "for the Better Preventing of Clandestine Marriage" comes into force in England and Wales.
- 18 April–20 May – General election increases the Whig Party's majority. Corruption is particularly notorious in the Oxfordshire election.
- 14 May – The Royal and Ancient Golf Club of St Andrews is founded in Scotland; it will come to control the rules of golf.
- 28 May – Battle of Jumonville Glen in Pennsylvania: British colonial militia from Virginia under the command of Lieutenant Colonel George Washington with Indian allies ambush a small force of French Canadians under Joseph Coulon de Jumonville (who is killed) in the first action of the global Seven Years' War and the North American French and Indian War.

== Publications ==
- 2 July – Leeds Intelligencer first published.
- Thomas Chippendale's The Gentleman and Cabinet Maker's Director.
- Jane Collier and Sarah Fielding's The Cry: A New Dramatic Fable.
- David Hume's The History of Great Britain begins publication.
- Isaac Newton (d. 1727)'s 1690 dissertation An Historical Account of Two Notable Corruptions of Scripture.

== Births ==
- 6 February – Andrew Fuller, Particular Baptist minister, promoter of missionary work (died 1815)
- 16 June – Peter Burrell, 1st Baron Gwydyr, English politician and co-founder of the Marylebone Cricket Club (died 1820)
- 11 July – Thomas Bowdler, physician (died 1825)
- 21 August – William Murdoch, inventor (died 1839)
- 7 September – Elizabeth Ann Linley, singer, wife of Richard Brinsley Sheridan (died 1792)
- 9 September – William Bligh, sailor (died 1817)
- 24 December – George Crabbe, poet (died 1832)

== Deaths ==
- 10 January – Edward Cave, editor and publisher (born 1691)
- 16 February – Richard Mead, physician (born 1673)
- 27 February – John Brownlow, 1st Viscount Tyrconnel, English politician (born 1690)
- 6 March – Henry Pelham, Prime Minister (born 1696)
- 2 April – Thomas Carte, historian (born 1686)
- 23 May – John Wood, the Elder, architect (born 1704)
- 2 June – Ebenezer Erskine, Scottish Secessionist minister (born 1680)
- 7 July – Frances Seymour, Duchess of Somerset (born 1699)
- 23 August – William Cleghorn, Scottish philosopher (born 1718)
- 29 September – William Keen, first resident judicial officer in the British colony of Newfoundland (born c. 1680)
- 8 October – Henry Fielding, novelist (born 1707)

== See also ==
- 1754 in Wales
