= 1610s in England =

Events from the 1610s in England.

== Incumbents ==
- Monarch – James I

== Events ==
- 1610
  - 9 February – Parliament assembles and debates the Great Contract proposed by Robert Cecil whereby in return for an annual grant of £200,000, the Crown should give up its feudal rights of Wardship and Purveyance, as well as New Impositions.
  - 23 May – the House of Commons petitions King James I against imposed duties.
  - 9 July – Lady Arbella Stuart, a claimant to the throne, is imprisoned for marrying William Seymour, another claimant, on 22 June. She will die in prison.
  - 23 July – Parliament prorogued.
  - 3 August – Henry Hudson leads an expedition to Hudson Bay.
  - 20 September – Case of Proclamations rules that the monarch cannot make decisions by proclamation unsupported by legislation.
  - 16 October – Parliament assembles.
  - 6 December – Parliament prorogued and does not assemble again until 1614.
  - December – Thomas Harriot becomes one of the first astronomers to observe sunspots.
  - Winter – the decision in Dr. Bonham's Case asserts the supremacy of the common law.
  - Stained glass windows installed in the chapel of Hatfield House by Robert Cecil, 1st Earl of Salisbury, are the first in the country since the start of the English Reformation.
  - First performance of Ben Jonson's satirical comedy The Alchemist.
  - First performance of William Shakespeare's late romance Cymbeline.
  - The first edition of William Camden's antiquarian chorography Britannia in English is published in an enlarged translation by Philemon Holland.
- 1611
  - 4 March – George Abbot is enthroned as Archbishop of Canterbury.
  - 2 May – the Authorized King James Version of the Bible is published, printed in London by Robert Barker.
  - 11 May – first recorded performance of Shakespeare's The Winter's Tale, probably new this year, by the King's Men at the Globe Theatre in London.
  - 22 May – the first hereditary baronets are created by letters patent from the King, largely as a means of funding the army. Sir Nicholas Bacon, 1st Baronet, of Redgrave in Suffolk becomes the premier baronet of England.
  - 22 June – the crew of Henry Hudson's ship Discovery mutiny leaving him adrift in Hudson Bay.
  - 1 November – at Whitehall Palace in London, William Shakespeare's romantic comedy and last solo play The Tempest is performed, perhaps for the first time. The Winter's Tale is presented at Court on 5 November.
  - John Donne's poem An Anatomy of the World published.
  - Ben Jonson's play Catiline His Conspiracy published.
  - Cyril Tourneur's play The Atheist's Tragedy published.
  - Last known traditional performance of an English mystery play, at Kendal.
  - Thomas Sutton founds Charterhouse School on the site of the old Carthusian monastery in Charterhouse Square, Smithfield, London.
- 1612
  - 18 March – Bartholomew Legate, an anti-Trinitarian, is burnt at the stake in London for heresy.
  - 11 April – Edward Wightman, a radical Anabaptist, is burnt at the stake in Lichfield for heresy, the last person to be executed for this crime in England.
  - 24 May – Secretary of State Robert Cecil, 1st Earl of Salisbury, dies and is succeeded by the King's favourite Robert Carr, Viscount Rochester.
  - 22 July – four women and a man are hanged following the Northamptonshire Witch Trials in Northampton.
  - 20 August – ten 'Pendle witches' are hanged having been found guilty of practising witchcraft in Lancashire.
  - John Webster's play The White Devil published.
  - Michael Drayton's topographical poem Poly-Olbion published.
  - Jacob Barnet (a Jew) is imprisoned by the University of Oxford for changing his mind about converting to Christianity; he is later exiled.
  - The value of the angel is raised from ten to eleven shillings.
  - probable date – Robert Dover stages the first Cotswold Olimpick Games near Chipping Campden.
- 1613
  - 14 February – Elizabeth Stuart, daughter of King James I, marries Frederick V, Elector Palatine, at the Chapel Royal in Whitehall.
  - 29 June – the original Globe Theatre in Southwark is destroyed by a fire started during a performance of the Shakespeare play Henry VIII.
  - 6 August – Great fire of Dorchester, Dorset.
  - 15 September – death of Thomas Overbury by poisoning in the Tower of London, having been imprisoned after quarrelling with Robert Carr, Viscount Rochester.
  - 29 September – the New River (engineered by Sir Hugh Myddelton) is opened to supply London with drinking water from Hertfordshire.
  - 3 November – Robert Carr, Viscount Rochester, is created Earl of Somerset.
  - 23 December – marriage of the Earl of Somerset to Frances Howard, occasioning John Donne's Eclogue.
  - Copper (tin-faced) farthings are produced by John Harington, 1st Baron Harington of Exton and his family under royal licence.
  - English colonists destroy a French settlement at Port Royal, Nova Scotia.
  - Elizabeth Cary, Lady Falkland's closet drama The Tragedy of Mariam is published.
  - Approximate date – John Webster's revenge tragedy The Duchess of Malfi is first performed, in London.
- 1614
  - 4 February – the King condemns duels in his proclamation Against Private Challenges and Combats.
  - 5 April – Parliament assembles for the first time since 1610 and debates the imposition of taxes by the King.
  - 7 June – King James dissolves the Addled Parliament for refusing to impose new taxes.
  - June – King James raises money through a Benevolence; non-contributors are arraigned before the Court of Star Chamber.
  - 1 September – lawyer Sir Julius Caesar becomes Master of the Rolls, an office he will hold until 1636.
  - 31 October – first performance of Ben Jonson's Bartholomew Fayre: A Comedy; it receives a Court performance the following day.
- 1615
  - Early February – Sir Thomas Roe sets out to become the first English ambassador to the Mughal Emperor Jahangir, sailing in the Lyon under the command of captain Christopher Newport.
  - 27 September – Lady Arbella Stuart starves herself to death in the Tower of London. Her aunt, Mary Talbot, Countess of Shrewsbury, is released, partly in recognition of her role in helping to discover the murder of Sir Thomas Overbury.
  - 'The Earl of Oxford's Case' determines that Equity should prevail over Common law if the two are in conflict.
  - John Browne is created first King's Gunfounder.
  - The Perse School in Cambridge is founded by Dr. Stephen Perse.
  - Wilson's Grammar School in Wallington is founded by royal charter.
  - Roger Brereley becomes perpetual curate at Grindleton in Lancashire; his preaching originates the sect of Grindletonians.
  - The first part of William Camden's Annales Rerum Gestarum Angliae et Hiberniae Regnate Elizabetha is published.
  - Gervase Markham's The English Huswife, Containing the Inward and Outward Virtues Which Ought to Be in a Complete Woman first published in London.
- 1616
  - 1 January – King James attends the masque The Golden Age Restored, a satire by Ben Jonson on fallen court favorite the Earl of Somerset. The king asks for a repeat performance on 4 January.
  - 3 January – the King's current favourite Sir George Villiers is appointed Master of the Horse; on 24 April he receives the Order of the Garter; and on 27 August is created Viscount Villiers and Baron Waddon, receiving a grant of land valued at £80,000.
  - 10 January – English diplomat Sir Thomas Roe presents his credentials to the Mughal Emperor Jahangir in Ajmer, opening the door to the British presence in India.
  - 1 February – King James grants Ben Jonson an annual pension of 100 marks, making him de facto poet laureate.
  - 11 March – Roman Catholic priest Thomas Atkinson is hanged, drawn, and quartered at York, at age 70.
  - 19 March – Sir Walter Ralegh is released from the Tower of London, where he has been imprisoned for treason, to organise an expedition to El Dorado.
  - 26 March–30 August – William Baffin makes a detailed exploration of Baffin Bay whilst searching for the Northwest Passage.
  - 23 April – playwright and poet William Shakespeare dies (on or about his 52nd birthday) in retirement in Stratford-upon-Avon and is buried two days later in the Church of the Holy Trinity there.
  - 25 April – Sir John Coke, in the Court of King's Bench, holds the King's actions in a case of In commendam to be illegal.
  - 25 May – the King's former favourite the Earl of Somerset and his wife Frances are convicted of the murder of Thomas Overbury. They are spared death and are sentenced to imprisonment in the Tower of London.
  - 12 June – Pocahontas (now Rebecca) arrives in England, with her husband, John Rolfe, their one-year-old son, Thomas Rolfe, her half-sister Matachanna (alias Cleopatra) and brother-in-law Tomocomo, the shaman also known as Uttamatomakkin (having set out in May). Ten Powhatan Indians are brought by Sir Thomas Dale, the colonial governor, at the request of the Virginia Company, as a fund-raising device. Dale, having been recalled under criticism, writes A True Relation of the State of Virginia, Left by Sir Thomas Dale, Knight, in May last, 1616, in a successful effort to redeem his leadership but neither Dale nor Pocahontas see Virginia again.
  - July – King James begins to raise revenue by the sale of peerages.
  - October
    - King James's School, Knaresborough in North Yorkshire is founded by Dr. Robert Chaloner.
    - John Donne is appointed as Reader in Divinity at his old inn of court in London, Lincoln's Inn.
  - October/November – Ben Jonson's satirical five-act comedy The Devil is an Ass is produced at the Blackfriars Theatre by the King's Men, poking fun at credence in witchcraft and Middlesex juries.
  - 4 November – Prince Charles, the 15-year-old surviving son of King James and Anne of Denmark, is invested as Prince of Wales at Whitehall, the last such formal investiture until 1911.
  - 5 November – Bishop Lancelot Andrewes preaches the annual Gunpowder Treason sermon before the King at Whitehall, both having been intended victims of the plot.
  - 6/25 November – Ben Jonson's works are published in a collected folio edition; the first of any English playwright.
  - 14 November – Sir Edward Coke is dismissed as Chief Justice of the King's Bench by royal prerogative.
  - 25 December
    - Captain Nathaniel Courthope reaches the nutmeg-rich island of Run in the Moluccas to defend it against the Dutch East India Company. A contract with the inhabitants accepting James I as their sovereign makes it part of the English colonial empire.
    - Father Christmas is a main character of Christmas, His Masque, written by Ben Jonson and presented at the royal court.
  - Epidemic typhus outbreak.
  - Witch trials under the Witchcraft Act 1603: Elizabeth Rutter is hanged as a witch in Middlesex, Agnes Berrye in Enfield, and nine women in Leicester at a summer assize presided over by Sir Humphrey Winch.
  - Inigo Jones designs the Queen's House at Greenwich as the first major example of classical architecture in the country (work is suspended in 1619 and resumed 1630–38).
  - The Anchor Brewery is established in London by James Monger next to the Globe Theatre in Southwark; it will be the world's largest by the early nineteenth century and brew until the 1970s.
  - Publications:
    - Beaumont and Fletcher's comedy The Scornful Lady (19 March).
    - Dr. John Bullokar's dictionary An English Expositor: teaching the interpretation of the hardest words used in our language, with sundry explications, descriptions and discourses.
    - John Deacon's tract Tobacco Tortured in the Filthy Fumes of Tobacco Refined.
    - Robert Fludd's defence of Rosicrucianism Apologia Compendiaria, Fraternitatem de Rosea Cruce suspicionis ... maculis aspersam, veritatis quasi Fluctibus abluens (at Leiden).
    - Ben Jonson's poem "To Celia".
- 1617
  - January
    - Sir George Villiers made Earl of Buckingham.
    - Pocahontas received at court; she dies two months later at Gravesend.
  - 7 March – Francis Bacon appointed Lord High Chancellor of England.
  - 17 March – Sir Walter Ralegh in The Destiny leaves on a second expedition to the Orinoco River in search of El Dorado. On 12 June, soon after leaving Plymouth, his fleet is scattered by a storm and it is unable to set out again (from Cork) until 19 August.
  - 23 August – the first one-way streets are created in alleys near the River Thames in London.
- 1618
  - 2 February - The Coleorton Masque is performed at Coleorton Hall, Leicestershire.
  - July – Thomas Howard, 1st Earl of Suffolk imprisoned for embezzling state funds while serving as Lord Treasurer.
  - 29 October – execution at the Palace of Westminster of Sir Walter Ralegh who has angered the Spanish on his final voyage by attacking one of their settlements on the Orinoco. The Spanish ambassador Diego Sarmiento de Acuña, conde de Gondomar has pressurised King James I over the matter.
  - King James issues the Declaration of Sports nationally permitting certain sports to be played on Sundays and other holidays.
  - John Selden's work The History of Tythes suppressed by the Privy Council.
  - The Company of Adventurers of London Trading to the Ports of Africa founded; establishes trading posts in Guinea.
- 1619
  - January – the royal Banqueting House, Whitehall in London is destroyed by fire. Inigo Jones is commissioned to design a replacement.
  - 11 March – Witches of Belvoir: Margaret and Philippa Flower are burnt at the stake having been found guilty of witchcraft.
  - 2 June – a treaty is signed to regulate trade and resolve disputes between the English and the Dutch East India Company.
  - 16 November – William Parker School, Hastings, is founded under the will of William Parker.
  - Act of parliament forbidding the growing of tobacco in England.
  - The value of the angel returns from eleven to ten shillings.
  - First Lizard Lighthouse erected in Cornwall.
  - Publication of Francis Beaumont and John Fletcher's plays A King and No King and The Maid's Tragedy.

== Births ==
- 1610
  - 1 March – John Pell, mathematician (died 1685)
  - 23 April – Lettice Boyle, noblewoman (died 1657)
  - 8 July (bapt.) – Richard Deane, military commander and regicide (died 1653)
  - 28 July (bapt.) – Henry Glapthorne, dramatist (died c.1643)
  - Abraham Wood, explorer in America, Indian trader, member of the Virginia House of Burgesses (died c.1682 at Fort Henry (Virginia))
  - approx. date – George Carteret, Jersey-born Royalist statesman (died 1680)
- 1611
  - 24 February (bapt.) – William Dobson, portrait painter (died 1646)
  - 1 September – William Cartwright, dramatist (died 1643)
- 1612
  - 17 January – Thomas Fairfax, English Civil War general (died 1671)
  - 22 February – George Digby, 2nd Earl of Bristol, statesman (died 1677)
  - 28 February – John Pearson, theologian (died 1686)
  - 4 December – Samuel Butler, satirist (died 1680)
  - John Hingston, court composer, viol player and organist (died 1683)
- 1613
  - 2 February – William Thomas, bishop (died 1689)
  - 26 March (bapt.) – Henry Vane, politician (died 1662)
  - Richard Crashaw, poet (died 1649)
- 1614
  - 14 February – John Wilkins, bishop, academic and natural philosopher (died 1672)
  - 10 July – Arthur Annesley, 1st Earl of Anglesey, royalist statesman (died 1686)
- 1615
  - 14 January – John Biddle, theologian (died 1662)
  - 7 September – Colonel John Birch, soldier (died 1691)
  - 12 November – Richard Baxter, clergyman (died 1691)
- 1616
  - 23 January – Ralph Josselin, vicar of Earls Colne in Essex (died 1683)
  - June – John Thurloe, secretary to the council of state in Protectorate England and spymaster for Oliver Cromwell (died 1668)
  - August – William Russell, 1st Duke of Bedford, peer and soldier (died 1700)
  - 17 September (bapt.) – Obadiah Walker, academic and Master of University College, Oxford from 1676 to 1688 (died 1699)
  - 18 October – Nicholas Culpeper, botanist (died 1654)
  - 23 November – John Wallis, mathematician (died 1703)
  - 17 December – Roger L'Estrange, pamphleteer and author (died 1704)
  - Henry Bard, 1st Viscount Bellomont, Royalist (died 1656)
  - Thomas Harrison, puritan soldier and Fifth Monarchist (died 1660)
  - William Holder, music theorist (died 1698)
  - John Owen, Nonconformist church leader and theologian (died 1683)
  - Edward Sexby, Puritan soldier and Leveller in the army of Oliver Cromwell (died 1658)
- 1617
  - 30 January – William Sancroft, Archbishop of Canterbury (died 1693)
  - 23 May – Elias Ashmole, antiquarian (died 1692)
  - 5 October – Dorothy Spencer, Countess of Sunderland (died 1684)
  - 9 December – Richard Lovelace, poet (died 1657)
- 1619
  - 10 January – Philip Sidney, 3rd Earl of Leicester, politician (died 1698)
  - 7 September – John Lambert, Parliamentarian general and politician (died 1684)
  - 17 December – Prince Rupert of the Rhine, Bohemian-born Royalist commander in the English Civil War (died 1682)

== Deaths ==
- 1610
  - 15 April – Robert Parsons, exiled Jesuit priest (born 1546)
  - July – Richard Knolles, historian (born 1545)
  - 2 November – Richard Bancroft, Archbishop of Canterbury (born 1544)
  - Peter Bales, calligrapher (born 1547)
- 1611
  - Henry Hudson, sea explorer and navigator (lost at sea) (born c. 1565?)
- 1612
  - 9 January – Sir Leonard Holliday, a founder of the East India Company and a Lord Mayor of London (born c. 1550?)
  - 15 January – Hadrian à Saravia, theologian (born 1532 in the Spanish Netherlands)
  - 11 April – Edward Wightman, Baptist preacher (burned at the stake) (born 1566)
  - 24 May – Robert Cecil, 1st Earl of Salisbury, statesman and spymaster (born 1563)
  - 4 August – Hugh Broughton, scholar (born 1549)
  - 6 November – Henry Frederick, Prince of Wales, heir to the throne (born 1594 in Scotland)
  - 12 November – Sir John Harington, courtier, writer and inventor of a flush toilet (born 1561)
- 1613
  - 28 January – Thomas Bodley, diplomat and library founder (born 1545)
  - 7 August – Thomas Fleming, judge (born 1544)
  - 15 September – Thomas Overbury, poet (murdered) (born 1581)
  - 22 December (2 January 1614 NS) – Luisa Carvajal y Mendoza, Catholic missionary to England (born 1566 in Spain)
- 1614
  - 15 June – Henry Howard, 1st Earl of Northampton, politician (born 1540)
  - 1 July – Isaac Casaubon, classical scholar and philologist (born 1559 in Geneva)
- 1615
  - 27 September – Arbella Stuart, noblewoman and woman of letters (born 1575)
- 1616
  - 6 January – Philip Henslowe, theatre manager (born 1550)
  - 6 March – Francis Beaumont, playwright (born 1584)
  - 23 April (O.S.) – William Shakespeare, playwright and poet (born 1564)
  - 19 June – Henry Robinson, Bishop of Carlisle (born c. 1553)
  - 23 November – Richard Hakluyt, author, editor and translator (born 1553)
- 1617
  - 27 October – Ralph Winwood, politician (born c. 1563)
  - 10 November – Barnabe Rich, soldier and writer (born c. 1540)
  - December – William Butler, physician (born 1535)
- 1618
  - 7 June – Thomas West, 3rd Baron De La Warr, Governor of Virginia (born 1577)
  - 20 July – James Montague, bishop and academic (born 1568)
  - 28 September – Joshua Sylvester, poet (born 1563)
  - 29 October – Sir Walter Ralegh, soldier, politician, courtier, explorer, historian, poet and spy (executed) (born 1552 or 1554)
- 1619
  - 7 January – Nicholas Hilliard, miniature painter (born c. 1547)
  - 3 February – Henry Brooke, 11th Baron Cobham, conspirator (born 1564)
  - 2 March – Anne of Denmark, queen consort of James I of England (born 1574)
  - 13 March – Richard Burbage, actor (born c. 1567)
  - 7 May – John Overall, bishop and academic (born 1559)
  - 14 October – Samuel Daniel, poet (born 1562)
