= 1767 in Great Britain =

Events from the year 1767 in Great Britain.

== Incumbents ==
- Monarch – George III
- Prime Minister – William Pitt, 1st Earl of Chatham (Whig)

== Events ==
- 9 June – the Townshend Acts are passed by Parliament, placing a tax on common products, such as lead, paper, paint, glass, and tea.
- 17 June – Cornish Royal Navy Captain Samuel Wallis becomes the first European to visit the island of Tahiti in the Pacific Ocean, during HMS Dolphin's second circumnavigation.
- 3 July – Pitcairn Island in the Pacific Ocean is sighted from HMS Swallow (1766) by 15-year-old Midshipman Robert Pitcairn on a Royal Navy expeditionary voyage commanded by Philip Carteret, the first definite European sighting.
- 7 October – Frederick North, Lord North, becomes Chancellor of the Exchequer after the sudden death of Charles Townshend.
- 12 October – Dr William Watson, at the Foundling Hospital in London, conducts an early planned and controlled clinical trial (on treatments for smallpox).
- 28 October – a boycott of 38 types of goods imported from England is resolved by merchants in Boston, Massachusetts, as a response to the taxes imposed by Britain.
- 20 November – the "Declaratory Act" (American Colonies Act 1766) goes into effect, repealing unpopular duties imposed in 1765 on the Thirteen Colonies but declaring Parliament's authority to be the same in North America as in Britain.
- Undated – Josiah Spode establishes the Spode pottery manufactory at Stoke-on-Trent.

== Publications ==
- The final volume of The Life and Opinions of Tristram Shandy, Gentleman by Laurence Sterne.
- The History and Present State of Electricity by Joseph Priestley.
- An Essay on the History of Civil Society by Adam Ferguson.
- The Farmer's Letters to the People of England, containing the sentiments of a practical husbandman ... by Arthur Young.
- First annual volume of The Nautical Almanac and Astronomical Ephemeris, produced by Astronomer Royal Nevil Maskelyne at the Royal Observatory, Greenwich, giving navigators the means to find longitude at sea using tables of lunar distance.

== Births ==
- January – William Shearman, physician and medical writer (died 1861)
- 1 January – Maria Edgeworth, novelist (died 1849)
- 6 March – Davies Gilbert, engineer, author, and politician (died 1839)
- 22 March – Robert Grosvenor, 1st Marquess of Westminster, Member of Parliament (died 1845)
- 24 April – Dorothy Ripley, missionary and writer (died 1832)
- 20 August – Lord William Russell, Member of Parliament (died 1840)
- 3 October – Alexander Hamilton, 10th Duke of Hamilton, politician (died 1852)
- 2 November – Prince Edward, Duke of Kent and Strathearn, member of the Royal Family (died 1820)
- 2 December – Lord Charles Somerset, governor of the Cape Colony (died 1831)
- unknown dates
  - George Barret, Jr., painter (died 1842)
  - Bewick Bridge, mathematician (died 1833)
  - Lewis Lavenu, musician, music seller and publisher (died 1818)

== Deaths ==
- 1 April – Laurence Oliphant, Jacobite soldier (born 1691)
- 10 July – Alexander Monro, physician (born 1697)
- 26 July – Henrietta Howard, Countess of Suffolk, mistress of George II of Great Britain (born 1689)
- 4 September – Charles Townshend, politician (born 1725)
- 17 September – Prince Edward, Duke of York and Albany, member of the Royal Family (born 1739)
- 26 October – Harry Pulteney, soldier and Member of Parliament (born 1686)
- 1 December – Henry Erskine, 10th Earl of Buchan, Freemason (born 1710)
- 22 December – John Newbery, publisher (born 1713)

== See also ==
- 1767 in Wales
