= 1690 in England =

- Centuries: 15th; 16th; 17th; 18th; 19th
- Decades: 1670s; 1680s; 1690s; 1700s; 1710s
- See also: Other events of 1690

Events from the year 1690 in England.

== Incumbents ==
- Monarchs – William III and Mary II

== Events ==
- 7 January – The first recorded full peal is rung, at St Sepulchre-without-Newgate in the City of London, marking a new era in change ringing.
- March – London, Quo Warranto Judgment Reversed Act 1689 ("An Act for Reversing the Judgment in a Quo Warranto against the City of London and for Restoreing the City of London to its antient Rights and Privileges") passed by Parliament.
- 20 May – The Act of Grace passed, forgiving followers of the deposed James II.
- 30 June – War of the Grand Alliance: Battle of Beachy Head: French naval victory over the English and Dutch.
- 1 July (O.S.) – Battle of the Boyne in Ireland: William III defeats the deposed James II who returns to exile in France.
- 25 July – War of the Grand Alliance: French raiders burn Teignmouth in Devon.
- 24 August – In India, Sutanuti – which later becomes Kolkata – is founded by Job Charnock of the English East India Company.
- December – Earliest recorded sighting of the planet Uranus, by John Flamsteed, who mistakenly catalogues it as the star 34 Tauri.
- 10 December – Playwright Henry Nevil Payne is tortured for his role in the Montgomery Plot to restore James II to the throne, the last time a political prisoner is subjected to torture in Britain.
- Quakers John Freame and Thomas Gould form a partnership as bankers in the City of London, origin of Barclays.
- Probable date – Planting of Hampton Court Maze.

== Publications ==
- An Essay Concerning Human Understanding by John Locke (dated this year but published in 1689).
- Political Arithmetic by William Petty.

== Births ==
- 3 February – Richard Rawlinson, minister and antiquarian (died 1755)
- 12 March – George Lee, 2nd Earl of Lichfield (died 1742)
- 22 April
  - John Carteret, 2nd Earl Granville, statesman (died 1763)
  - (baptised) – Robert Raikes the Elder, printer (died 1757)
- 29 October – Martin Folkes, English antiquarian (died 1754)
- 1 December – Philip Yorke, 1st Earl of Hardwicke, Lord Chancellor (died 1764)
- 2 December – Robert Shafto, Member of Parliament (died 1729)
- date unknown
  - Charles Bridgeman, garden designer (died 1738)
  - Hester Santlow, dancer and actress (died 1773)

== Deaths ==
- 4 February – Sir John Child, 1st Baronet, governor of Bombay (year of birth unknown)
- 7 February – Sir William Morice, 1st Baronet, Royalist statesman (born c.1628)
- March – Sir Philip Parker, 1st Baronet, Member of Parliament (born c. 1625)
- 21 May – John Eliot, Puritan missionary to Native Americans, died in Massachusetts Bay Colony (born 1604)
- 12 July – George Walker, soldier, killed in action at the Battle of the Boyne (born (1645)
- 9 October – Henry FitzRoy, 1st Duke of Grafton, illegitimate son of King Charles II, military commander, died of wounds received at Siege of Cork (born 1663)
- 15 October – Thomas and Ann Rogers, counterfeiters, executed
- By 10 December – Sir Richard Willis, 1st Baronet, Royalist double agent (born 1614)
- 15 December – Sir Thomas Allen, 1st Baronet, Member of Parliament (born c. 1633)
