= 1698 in England =

- Centuries: 15th; 16th; 17th; 18th; 19th
- Decades: 1670s; 1680s; 1690s; 1700s; 1710s
- See also: Other events of 1698

Events from the year 1698 in England.

== Incumbents ==
- Monarch – William III

== Events ==
- 4 January – the Palace of Whitehall is destroyed by fire.
- 11 January–21 April – Czar Peter I of Russia visits England as part of his Grand Embassy, making a particular study of shipbuilding.
- March – Jeremy Collier's pamphlet A Short View of the Immorality and Profaneness of the English Stage is published.
- 24 June – abolition of the Royal African Company's monopoly is confirmed under terms of the Trade with Africa Act 1697, opening the slave trade to any merchant.
- 25 July – engineer Thomas Savery obtains a patent for a steam pump.
- July–August – general election results in victory for the New Country Tories.
- 11 October – Treaty of the Hague signed between France, England and Holland.
- 14 November – first Eddystone Lighthouse illuminated.

=== Undated ===
- Piracy Act ("An Act for the more effectuall Suppressions of Piracy") passed.
- Popery Act enforces penalties against Roman Catholic priests.
- Reverend Thomas Bray founds the Society for Promoting Christian Knowledge.
- Thermal springs discovered at Matlock Bath in Derbyshire.
- The widow Bourne sets up the business which becomes Berry Brothers and Rudd in London. They will still be operating as wine merchants in the 21st century.
- Shepherd Neame Brewery established under this name in Faversham.

== Births ==
- 10 January? – Richard Savage, poet (died 1743)
- 8 May – Henry Baker, naturalist (died 1774)
- 26 September – William Cavendish, 3rd Duke of Devonshire (died 1755)
- 24 December – William Warburton, critic and Bishop of Gloucester (died 1779)

== Deaths ==
- 24 January – William Holder, music theorist (born 1616)
- 7 February – Richard Adams, theologian (born c. 1626)
- 29 April – Charles Cornwallis, 3rd Baron Cornwallis, First Lord of the Admiralty (born 1655)
- 25 August – Fleetwood Sheppard, courtier and literary wit (born 1634)
- 3 September – Sir Robert Howard, playwright, poet and politician (born 1626)
- 13 September (bur.) – John Huddleston, Benedictine priest (born 1608)
- 1 October – Richard Frankland, dissenter (born 1630)
- Unknown date – Nicholas Barbon, economist (born c. 1640)
