= The Madrigal Society =

British amateur music association

- Formation: circa 1741
- Type: association of amateur musicians
- Purpose: singing of madrigals
- Location: London, England

The Madrigal Society is a British association of amateur musicians. As with other madrigal societies in England and elsewhere, its whole purpose is to sing madrigals. It may be the oldest club of its kind in existence in England. It was founded by the copyist John Immyns. Sir John Hawkins was an early member of the club and, in his General History of the Science and Practice of Music of 1776, gives the date of its foundation as 1741; the earliest documentary evidence dates from 1744.

In April 1940, due to The Blitz on London, the Society suspended its regular meetings, but resumed them in 1946, after the end of the Second World War.
