= Treaty of Southampton =

1625 alliance between England and the Dutch Republic

The Treaty of Southampton was an alliance between England and the Dutch Republic against the Kingdom of Spain. Concluded at Southampton on September 7, 1625, the pact was drawn in French, and agreed to establish the King of Spain as a common enemy of the two nations: "afin d'assaillir le Roy d'Espaigne a guerre ouverte, en tous ses royaumes, terres, subjects, et droicts, en tous lieux, deçá et delá la ligne, par mer et par terre." ('for the purpose of attacking the King of Spain in open war in all his realms in all places, on this side and beyond the line, by land and sea'). The parties were to be aligned for as long as the King of Spain continued to fight the rebelling Dutch Republic in the Eighty Years' War and continued with occupation of the Palatinate in opposition to Protestant ascendancy, or at least fifteen years from signing. This amounted to a recognition of the Dutch Republic.

The treaty outlined maritime rights of trade and operation for each party, and called for other nations to join the alliance which was accomplished in part with the Treaty of The Hague. Following the treaty negotiations, English forces under Edward Cecil attacked Spain at Cádiz, with heavy losses. In America, Dutch merchants negotiated to effect trade with Plymouth Colony from New Amsterdam.

In 1627, Charles I of England repeated the admonishment to provide freedom of trade to the Dutch in response to English violations of the treaty, even while holding Dutch ships to appease Parliamentary anger over the Amboyna massacre of Englishmen by agents of the Dutch East India Company. However, by 1630 with the French aligned with Spain in the wake of the earlier failure of the Spanish match, Charles abandoned the Dutch alliance of the Treaty of Southampton with the signing of the Treaty of Madrid.
