= Thomas Walkington =

English cleric and author

Thomas Walkington (died 1621) was an English cleric and author.

== Life ==
Walkington was a native of Lincoln. He was educated at Cambridge, where he graduated B.A. in 1596–1597 and M.A. in 1600. He was elected to a fellowship at St. John's College, Cambridge, on 26 March 1603. He was incorporated B.D. of Oxford on 14 July 1611, and proceeded D.D. of Cambridge in 1613. He was presented to the vicarage of Raunds, Northamptonshire, in 1608, and to the rectory of Wadingham St. Mary, Lincolnshire, in 1610, and the vicarage of Fulham, Middlesex, on 25 May 1615. He died in 1621, the administration of his goods being granted on 29 October of that year.

== Works ==
Walkington was author of a book that anticipated Robert Burton's Anatomy of Melancholy. It was entitled The Optick Glasse of Humors, or the Touchstone of a Golden Temperature, or the Philosophers Stone to make a Golden Temper. Wherein the Four Complections, Sanguine, Cholericke, Phligmaticke, Melancholicke are Succinctly Painted forth […] by T. W., Master of Arts. The first edition seems to be that which is stated on the title-page to have been printed by John Windet for Martin Clerke in London in 1607. This was dedicated to Sir Justinian Lewin from "my study in St. Johns, Camb. 10 Kal. March. T. W.". An undated edition, which cannot be dated earlier than 1631, was printed by W[illiam] T[urner] at Oxford. This issue, which has the same dedication as its predecessor, has an elaborately engraved title-page on steel, in which two graduates in cap and gown, representing respectively the universities of Cambridge and Oxford, hold between them an optic glass or touchstone (Madan, Early Oxford Press, pp. 160–161). William Carew Hazlitt describes a fragment of an edition printed at Oxford with a different dedication addressed to the author's "friend, M. Carye" (Collections, 1st ser.). Later editions, with the engraved title-page, appeared in London in 1630 and 1663. Richard Farmer, in his Essay on the Learning of Shakespeare, credited "T. Wombwell" with the authorship of Walkington's treatise on the Optick Glasse, and referred to a passage (traceable to Scaliger) by way of illustrating Shylock's remarks on irrational antipathies (Merchant of Venice, iv.i.49).

Walkington was also the author of An Exposition of the two first verses of the sixth chapter to the Hebrews, in form of a Dialogue, by T. W., Minister of the Word, London, 1609; of Theologicall Rules to guide us in the Understanding and Practice of Holy Scriptures […] also Enigmata Sacra, Holy Riddles […] by T. W., Preacher of the Word, 2 pts. London, 1615; of Rabboni, Mary Magdalen's Teares of Sorrow […] London, 1620; and, according to Anthony Wood, of a sermon on Ecclesiastes xii.10.
