= 1694 in England =

- Centuries: 15th; 16th; 17th; 18th; 19th
- Decades: 1670s; 1680s; 1690s; 1700s; 1710s
- See also: Other events of 1694

Events from the year 1694 in England.

== Incumbents ==
- Monarch – William III, jointly with Mary II (until 28 December), then as sole monarch (starting 28 December)

== Events ==
- 1 March – British flagship HMS Sussex (1693) (carrying gold coin) and twelve other ships are wrecked in a storm in the Mediterranean off Gibraltar with the loss of approximately 1,200 lives.
- May – the First Whig Junto is appointed to government.
- June – Henry Every leads a bloodless mutiny aboard the privateer Charles II in Spain.
- 27 July – the Bank of England is established by Royal charter following a proposal by Scottish-born merchant William Paterson; John Houblon becomes its first Governor.
- 5 September – Great Fire of Warwick.
- 25 October – Queen Mary II founds the Royal Hospital for Seamen at Greenwich.
- 3 December – Parliament passes the Meeting of Parliament Act (Triennial Act) requiring general elections every three years and an annual meeting.
- 28 December – with the death of Queen Mary II (aged 32) from smallpox at Kensington Palace, King William III becomes sole monarch.
- Notorious voyage of the English slave ship Hannibal in the Atlantic slave trade out of Benin, ending with the death of nearly half of the 692 slaves aboard.
- The Million Lottery, the first state lottery, is drawn.

== Publications ==
- Mary Astell's (anonymous) argument for the promotion of female education A Serious Proposal to the Ladies, for the Advancement of Their True and Greatest Interest.
- "N.H."'s The Ladies Dictionary, being a general entertainment of the fair-sex: a work never attempted before in English is published by John Dunton.

== Births ==
- 25 April – Richard Boyle, 3rd Earl of Burlington, architect (died 1753)
- 22 September – Philip Dormer Stanhope, 4th Earl of Chesterfield, statesman and man of letters (died 1773)
- 25 September – Henry Pelham, Prime Minister of Great Britain (died 1754)

== Deaths ==
- 2 January – Henry Booth, 1st Earl of Warrington, politician (born 1651)
- 7 January – Charles Gerard, 1st Earl of Macclesfield (born c. 1618)
- 17 June – Philip Howard, Roman Catholic Cardinal (born 1629)
- 22 November – John Tillotson, Archbishop of Canterbury (born 1630)
- 28 December – Queen Mary II of England, Scotland and Ireland (born 1662)
