= 1687 in England =

- Centuries: 15th; 16th; 17th; 18th; 19th
- Decades: 1660s; 1670s; 1680s; 1690s; 1700s
- See also: Other events of 1687

Events from the year 1687 in England.

== Incumbents ==
- Monarch – James II

== Events ==
- 27 January – French-born Catholic midwife Mary Hobry murders her abusive husband, Denis, dismembers his body and conceals the remains in London. She will be convicted of murder and burned at the stake on 2 March.
- 4 April – King James II issues the Declaration of Indulgence (or Declaration for the Liberty of Conscience), suspending laws against Roman Catholics and nonconformists.
- 1 May – King James II attends the consecration of Ferdinando d'Adda, Papal Nuncio to London, as titular Archbishop of Amasia in the Royal Chapel of St James's Palace.
- 4 September – King James II tries to expel the Fellows of Magdalen College, Oxford, for refusing to Catholicise their institution.

== Publications ==
- 5 July – Isaac Newton's Philosophiæ Naturalis Principia Mathematica, known as the Principia, is published by the Royal Society of London.

== Births ==
- c. 26 August – Henry Carey, poet, dramatist and songwriter (suicide 1743)
- 7 November – William Stukeley, archaeologist (died 1765)

== Deaths ==
- 16 April – George Villiers, 2nd Duke of Buckingham, statesman (born 1628)
- 1 September – Henry More, philosopher (born 1614)
- 12 September – John Alden, Mayflower pilgrim (born c. 1599)
- 21 October – Edmund Waller, poet (born 1606)
- 14 November – Nell Gwynne, actress, a mistress of Charles II of England (born 1650)
- 10 December – Robert Venables, Parliamentarian soldier (born c. 1613)
- 16 December – Sir William Petty, philosopher, scientist and economist (born 1623)
