= 1755 in Great Britain =

Events from the year 1755 in Great Britain.

== Incumbents ==
- Monarch – George II
- Prime Minister – Thomas Pelham-Holles, 1st Duke of Newcastle (Whig)

== Events ==
- 20 February – General Edward Braddock lands in Virginia to take command of the British forces against the French in North America.
- 25 March – Landslip at Whitestone Cliff in the Hambleton Hills of North Yorkshire.
- June – Joseph Black's discovery of carbon dioxide and magnesium is communicated in a paper to the Philosophical Society of Edinburgh.
- 24 June – Thomas Whitty originates Axminster Carpets.
- 9 July – French and Indian War: Braddock Expedition – British troops and colonial militiamen are ambushed and suffer a devastating defeat inflicted by French and Indian forces. During the battle, British General Edward Braddock is mortally wounded. Colonel George Washington survives.
- 20 November – William Pitt the Elder is dismissed from the position of Paymaster of the Forces while Henry Bilson Legge resigns as Chancellor of the Exchequer and George Grenville as Treasurer of the Navy in protest over payments made to Russia to protect Hanover.
- 2 December – the second Eddystone Lighthouse is destroyed by fire.
- December – formation of 23rd Regiment of Foot, predecessor of the 51st (2nd Yorkshire West Riding) Regiment of Foot and earliest constituent of The King's Own Yorkshire Light Infantry.

=== Unknown dates ===
- The Wolsey hosiery business is established in Leicester by Henry Wood; it will still be trading in the 21st century.
- Building of St Ninian's Church, Tynet, Scotland, the country's oldest surviving post-Reformation Roman Catholic clandestine church.

== Publications ==
- 15 April – Samuel Johnson's A Dictionary of the English Language; Johnson had begun the work in 1746.

== Births ==
- 17 February – Dorothy Kilner, children's author (died 1836)
- 21 February – Anne Grant, poet and author (died 1838)
- 5 July – Sarah Siddons, Welsh-born actress (died 1831)
- 8 September – James Graham, 3rd Duke of Montrose, nobleman and statesman (died 1836)
- 17 November – Charles Manners-Sutton, Archbishop of Canterbury (died 1828)
- 23 November – Thomas Lord, cricketer and founder of Lord's Cricket Ground (died 1832)

== Deaths ==
- 6 April – Richard Rawlinson, English minister and antiquarian (born 1690)
- 13 July – Edward Braddock, British general (born c. 1695)
- 1 December – Maurice Greene, English composer (born 1696)

== See also ==
- 1755 in Wales
