= 1688 in England =

- Centuries: 15th; 16th; 17th; 18th; 19th
- Decades: 1660s; 1670s; 1680s; 1690s; 1700s
- See also: Other events of 1688

Events from the year 1688 in England. This was the year of the Glorious Revolution that overthrew King James II.

== Incumbents ==
- Monarch – James II (until 11 December)

== Events ==
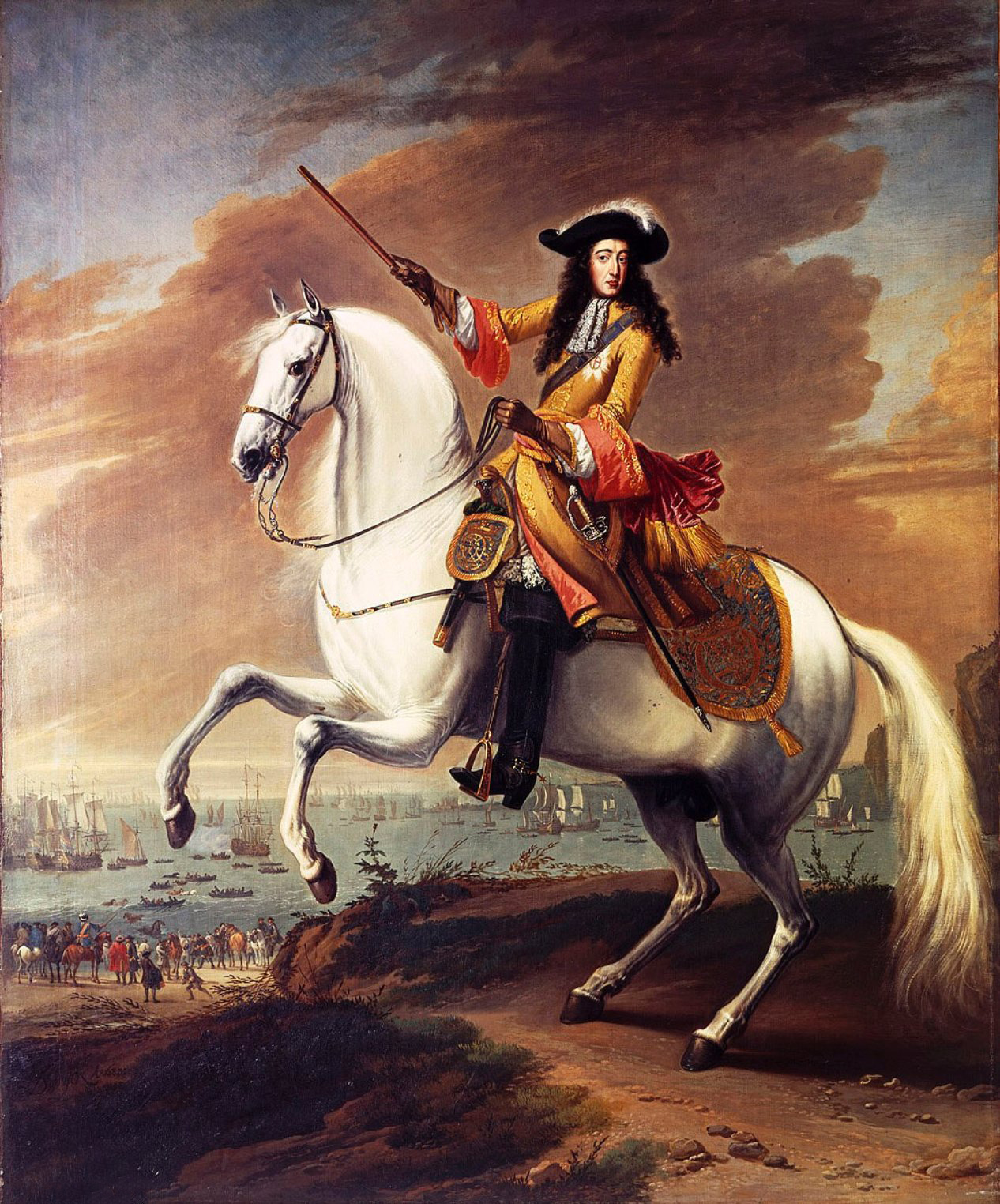
Glorious Revolution: Equestrian portrait of William III by Jan Wyck, commemorating his landing in Torbay

- March – William Dampier makes first recorded landing on Christmas Island.
- 1 March – great fire devastates Bungay.
- 4 May – Declaration of Indulgence (reissued on 25 April) ordered to be read aloud in all churches on two consecutive Sundays. Following this, the Friends meeting house at Jordans, Buckinghamshire, is built.
- 13 May – the Archbishop of Canterbury, William Sancroft, in a meeting at Lambeth Palace, forms the nucleus of the Seven Bishops resolving to oppose the reading of the Declaration of Indulgence. On 18 May they present a petition to the King.
- 8 June ("Black Friday") – the Seven Bishops are imprisoned in the Tower of London prior to trial for seditious libel.
- 10 June – birth of James Francis Edward Stuart, son to King James II and his Catholic wife Mary of Modena, at St James's Palace in London. Rumours about his true maternity swiftly begin to circulate.
- 29–30 June – the Seven Bishops, tried at the Court of King's Bench, are found not guilty of seditious libel.
- 30 June – a conspiracy of notables, the "Immortal Seven", send the Invitation to William, inviting William of Orange and Mary to depose James II, as has been planned since April. Mary is James's second heir, her husband (and cousin) is James's nephew, and both have been raised Protestant.
- by July – first definitely known performance of the Henry Purcell opera Dido and Aeneas, at Josias Priest's girls' school in Chelsea, London.
- 24 August – James II orders the issue of a writ of election, withdrawn in September.
- 27 October – James II dismisses government minister Robert Spencer, 2nd Earl of Sunderland.
- 5 November (15 November NS) – Glorious Revolution begins: William lands at Brixham; James is prevented from meeting him in battle because many of his officers and men desert to the other side.
- 10 November – Glorious Revolution: Wincanton Skirmish between forces loyal to James II led by Patrick Sarsfield and a party of Dutch troops.
- 25 November – James's daughter Princess Anne, with the assistance of her favourite Sarah Churchill, flee the royal court at Whitehall and, with their husbands, declare for William.
- 9 December
  - Glorious Revolution: Battle of Reading: Dutch soldiers of William of Orange with the support of townspeople defeat an Irish Jacobite garrison (led by Patrick Sarsfield) in a skirmish in the streets of Reading, Berkshire, the last battle fought on English soil and the only significant military action of the Revolution; his force's success is influential in William's decision to proceed directly to London and claim the throne and in James's decision to flee the country.
  - Queen Mary of Modena flees to France with her infant son, the Prince of Wales.
- 11 December – the defeated James II attempts to flee to France but is intercepted by fishermen in Kent.
- 13 December – "Irish Fright": false rumours of James II's disbanded Irish soldiers preparing to carry out massacres of English towns begin to spread.
- 18 December – William of Orange enters London.
- 22 December – James II succeeds in fleeing to France.
- December – John Dryden dismissed as Poet Laureate for refusing to swear loyalty to the new monarchy.
- undated – Lloyd's of London marine insurance market begins to form on the premises of Edward Lloyd in London.

== Publications ==
- Mrs Aphra Behn's novel Oroonoko.
- John Locke has the first abstract of his seminal An Essay Concerning Human Understanding appear in Leclerc's Bibliothèque universelle.
- George Savile, 1st Marquess of Halifax's The Anatomy of an Equivalent and The Lady's New-Years Gift: or, Advice to a Daughter (anonymous).
- Fourth (and illustrated) edition of John Milton's Paradise Lost.

== Births ==
- 18 January – Lionel Sackville, 1st Duke of Dorset, Lord Lieutenant of Ireland (died 1765)
- 22 May – Alexander Pope, poet (died 1744)
- 10 June – James Francis Edward Stuart, "The Old Pretender" (died 1766)
- 6 September (bapt.) – Laurence Eusden, poet laureate (died 1730)
- 15 November (bapt.) – Charles Rivington, publisher (died 1742)
- Richard Cresswell, rake (died 1743)

== Deaths ==
- 7 January – James Howard, 3rd Earl of Suffolk (born 1606/1607)
- 26 June – Ralph Cudworth, philosopher (born 1617)
- 25 August – Henry Morgan, privateer and Governor of Jamaica (born c. 1635)
- 31 August – John Bunyan, writer (born 1628)
- 2 September – Sir Robert Viner, Lord Mayor of London (born 1631)
- 6 October – Christopher Monck, 2nd Duke of Albemarle, statesman (born 1653)
