= John Immyns =

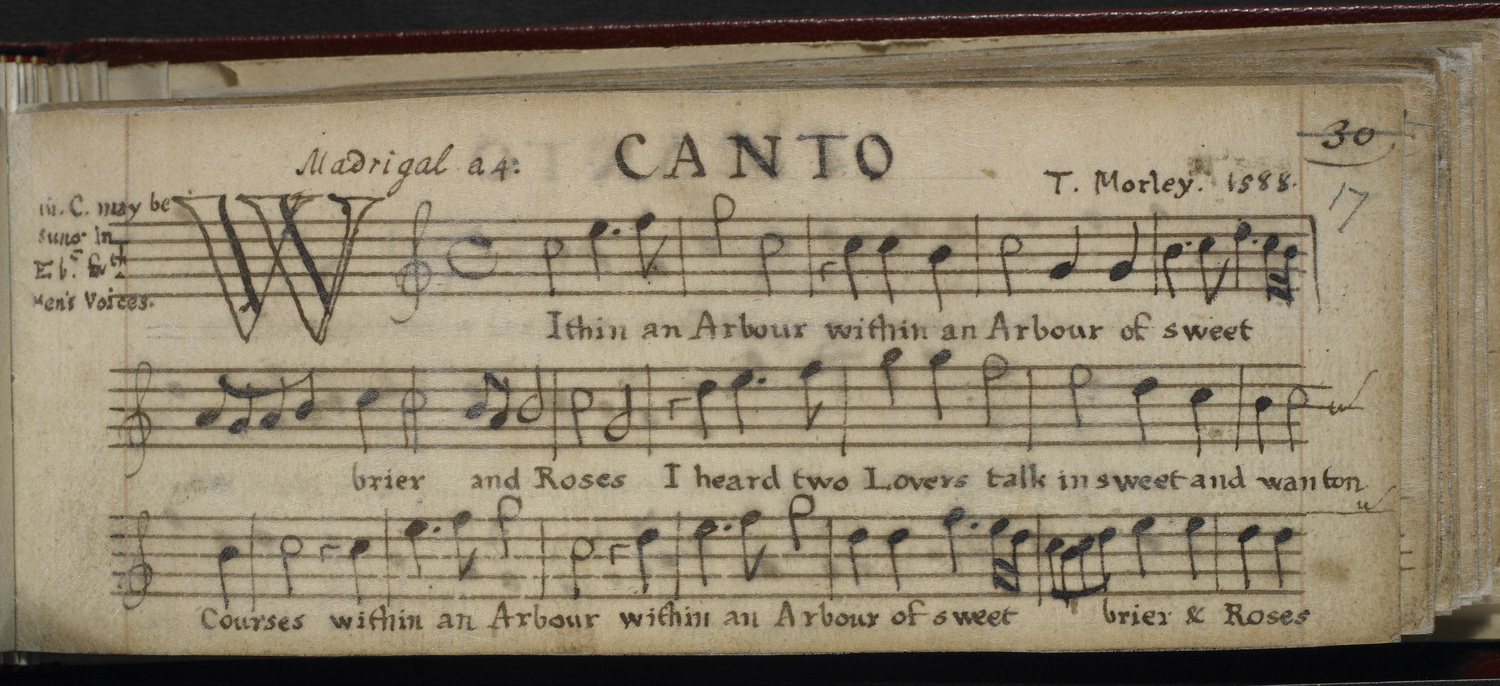
Manuscript in Immyns's hand of the madrigal "Within an Arbour of Sweet Brier and Roses" by Thomas Morley

John Immyns (1700 – 15 April 1764) was an English attorney, lutenist, and prolific copyist.

Immyns taught himself to play the lute at the age of 40, and was a connoisseur and collector of old music. He founded the Madrigal Society sometime between 1741 and 1744, and in 1752 was given the sinecure post of Lutenist to the Chapel Royal. He was also a member of the Academy of Ancient Music, and served as amanuensis to Johann Christoph Pepusch.
