= 1693 in England =

- Centuries: 15th; 16th; 17th; 18th; 19th
- Decades: 1670s; 1680s; 1690s; 1700s; 1710s
- See also: Other events of 1693

Events from the year 1693 in England.

== Incumbents ==
- Monarchs – William III and Mary II

== Events ==
- 8 February – the College of William and Mary in Williamsburg, Virginia, is granted a Royal charter from King William III and Queen Mary II of England.
- March – William Congreve's first play, the comedy The Old Bachelor, is performed at the Theatre Royal, Drury Lane.
- 17 June (27 June New Style) – Nine Years' War: The French fleet defeats the joint Dutch and English fleet at the Battle of Lagos off Portugal.
- 19 July (29 July New Style) – Nine Years' War: The Dutch-English army led personally by King William III of England is defeated by the French (with Irish Jacobite mercenaries) at the Battle of Landen near Neerwinden in Flemish Brabant.
- October – Congreve's comedy The Double Dealer is first performed at Drury Lane.

=== Undated ===
- Bromsgrove School endowed by Sir Thomas Cookes.
- The Anglo-Saxon Alfred Jewel is discovered at North Petherton in Somerset.
- Financier Richard Hoare relocates Hoare's Bank (founded 1672) from Cheapside to Fleet Street in London.

== Publications ==
- 27 February – 17 March – John Dunton publishes The Ladies' Mercury, the first periodical specifically for women.
- John Locke's Some Thoughts Concerning Education.
- William Penn's proposal for European federation Essay on the Present and Future Peace of Europe.
- Vertue Rewarded – anonymous Irish novel, printed in London

== Births ==
- 4 February – George Lillo, playwright (died 1739)
- 24 February – James Quin, actor (died 1766)
- 24 March – John Harrison, clockmaker (died 1776)
- 3 April – George Edwards, naturalist (died 1773)
- 21 July – Thomas Pelham-Holles, 1st Duke of Newcastle-upon-Tyne, Prime Minister of Great Britain (died 1768)
- 21 September – Thomas Secker, Archbishop of Canterbury (died 1768)

== Deaths ==
- 2 June – John Wildman, soldier and politician (born c. 1621)
- 12 July – John Ashby, admiral (born c. 1640)
- 24 November – William Sancroft, Archbishop of Canterbury (born 1617)
