= 1695 in England =

- Centuries: 15th; 16th; 17th; 18th; 19th
- Decades: 1670s; 1680s; 1690s; 1700s; 1710s
- See also: Other events of 1695

Events from the year 1695 in England.

== Incumbents ==
- Monarch – William III

== Events ==
- 13 January – Princess Anne returns to court to act as royal hostess.
- 7 March – Sir John Trevor, Speaker of the House of Commons, is found guilty of taking a bribe and expelled from the Commons.
- April – Parliament decides not to renew the Licensing Order of 1643 requiring press censorship.
- 30 April – William Congreve's comedy Love for Love opens the New Theatre, Lincoln's Inn Fields.
- 3 May – Parliament passes the Corrupt Practices Act to tackle bribery in general elections.
- 16 May – Thomas Tenison enthroned as Archbishop of Canterbury, the first Primate of All England since the Reformation to be installed in person at Canterbury Cathedral.
- 24 June – a commission of enquiry into the Massacre of Glencoe reports to Parliament, blaming Sir John Dalrymple, Secretary of State over Scotland, and declares that a soldier should refuse to obey a "command against the law of nature".
- 1 September
  - Nine Years' War: France surrenders Namur in the Spanish Netherlands to forces of the Grand Alliance led by King William III of England following the 2-month Siege of Namur.
  - HMS Winchester (1693) founders in the Florida Keys with the loss of 400.
- 7 September – English pirate Henry Every in the Fancy perpetrates one of the most profitable raids in history with the capture of the Grand Mughal ship Ganj-i-Sawai. In response, Emperor Aurangzeb threatens to put an end to all English trading in India.
- November – general election results in victory for the Whigs.
- 31 December – the window tax is imposed.

=== Undated ===
- Quakers Act ("An Act that the Solemne Affirmation & Declaration of the People called Quakers shall be accepted instead of an Oath in the usual Forme") permits Quakers (who conscientiously object to taking an oath) to substitute an affirmation in certain legal proceedings.
- Wren Library, Cambridge, the library of Trinity College, designed by Christopher Wren, is completed.

== Births ==
- 2 February – William Borlase, naturalist (died 1772)
- 20 November – John Bevis, physician and astronomer (died 1771)

== Deaths ==
- 5 March – Henry Wharton, writer (born 1664)
- 5 April – George Savile, 1st Marquess of Halifax, writer and statesman (born 1633)
- 27 April – John Trenchard, statesman (born 1640)
- 21 November – Henry Purcell, composer (born 1654)
- 28 November – Anthony Wood, antiquarian (born 1632)
