= 1820 in the United Kingdom =

Events from the year 1820 in the United Kingdom. This year sees a change of monarch after a nine-year Regency.

== Incumbents ==
- Monarch – George III (until 29 January), George IV (starting 29 January)
- Regent – George, Prince Regent (until 29 January)
- Prime Minister – Robert Jenkinson, 2nd Earl of Liverpool (Tory)
- Foreign Secretary – Robert Stewart, Viscount Castlereagh
- Home Secretary – Lord Sidmouth
- Secretary of War – Lord Bathurst

== Events ==
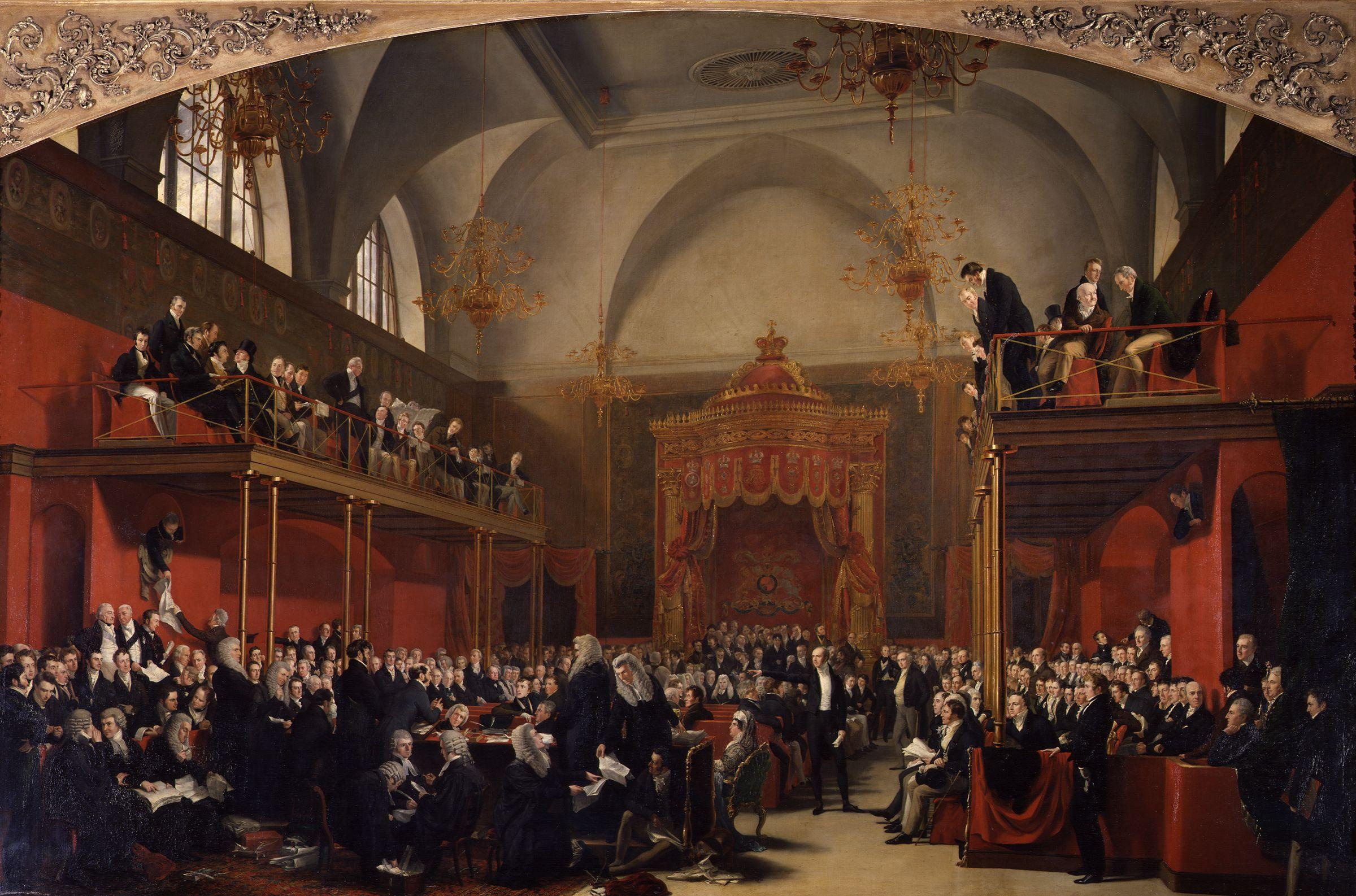
The Trial of Queen Caroline by George Hayter.

- 8 January – General Maritime Treaty ("General Treaty for the Cessation of Plunder and Piracy by Land and Sea, Dated February 5, 1820") signed between the sheikhs of Abu Dhabi, Sharjah, Ajman, Umm Al Quwain and Ras Al Khaimah (later constituents of the Trucial States) in the Arabian Peninsula and the United Kingdom.
- 29 January – George IV of the United Kingdom ascends the throne on the death at Windsor Castle of his father George III (after nearly 60 years on the throne), ending the period known as the Regency era which began in 1811. George IV has served as prince regent during this time due to his father's mental deterioration. The title Prince of Wales falls into abeyance for 21 years.
- 30 January – Royal Navy captain Edward Bransfield in the Williams is the first person to positively identify Antarctica as a land mass.
- 23 February – A plot to murder the Cabinet, the Cato Street Conspiracy, is exposed. Bow Street Runners arrest conspirators in Paddington. Richard Smithers, a constable, is killed in the struggle.
- 10 March – Astronomical Society of London is founded.
- 1–2 April – A Proclamation, signed "By order of the Committee of Organisation for forming a Provisional Government", is distributed in the Glasgow area, beginning the "Radical War" in Scotland. The following day, around 60,000 – particularly weavers – stop work across a wide area of central Scotland. Disaffection spreads to the West Riding of Yorkshire.
- 5 April – Radical War: Troops capture radicals at Bonnybridge.
- 8 April – Radical War: Radical prisoners from Paisley are freed from jail in Greenock after militia have killed eight of the crowd.
- 14 April – The 1820 United Kingdom general election, which began on 6 March, concludes with an increased Tory party majority.
- 1 May
  - The Cato Street conspirators are the last to suffer judicial decapitation in the UK following their public hanging for treason outside Newgate Prison in London (legally, a mitigation of the last sentence in Britain of hanging, drawing and quartering).
  - Robert Owen's Report to the County of Lanark, of a plan for relieving public distress and removing discontent (published 1821) is delivered in Scotland as the beginning of a plan to devise the labour voucher.
- 11 May – Launch of HMS Beagle, the ship that will take the young Charles Darwin on his scientific voyage, at Woolwich Dockyard.
- 5 June – Caroline of Brunswick, the new King's estranged wife, returns to England after six years abroad in Italy, where she has been carrying on an affair, and attracts the support of radical mobs. Since ascending the throne, the King has sought to receive his government's approval for a divorce.
- 10 June – Sir Thomas Munro is appointed as the British colonial Governor of the Madras Presidency, which encompasses most of southern India.
- 5 July – Pains and Penalties Bill put before Parliament to deprive Caroline of Brunswick, George IV's estranged wife, of the title of Queen Consort, leading to her de facto public trial before the House of Lords opening on 17 August. Although narrowly passed on 10 November in the House of Lords, the bill is withdrawn in the knowledge that it would almost certainly not pass the House of Commons.
- 26 July – Opening of Union Chain Bridge across the River Tweed between England and Scotland, designed by Captain Samuel Brown. Its span of 449 ft (137 metres) is the longest in the Western world at this time, and it is the first wrought iron vehicular suspension bridge of its type in Britain.
- 1 August – Completion and opening of the Regent's Canal through to the London Docks.
- 30 August – Radical War: Radical leader James Wilson, a Strathaven weaver, is executed for treason on Glasgow Green for his part in the rising.
- 8 September – Radical War: Radical leaders John Baird and Andrew Hardie are executed at Stirling for their part in the rising at Bonnybridge.

== Publications ==
- Friedrich Accum's exposé A Treatise on Adulterations of Food and Culinary Poisons.
- Hone and Cruickshank's satirical work The Queen's Matrimonial Ladder.
- John Keats' collection Lamia and Other Poems.
- Sir Walter Scott's anonymous novels The Abbot and The Monastery.
- Percy Bysshe Shelley's lyrical drama Prometheus Unbound.
- The 6th Edition of Encyclopædia Britannica.
- Publication of the last of William Blake's prophetic books, Jerusalem: The Emanation of the Giant Albion, is completed.

== Births ==
- 17 January – Anne Brontë, novelist and poet (died 1849)
- 13 February – James Geiss, businessman (died 1878)
- 28 February – John Tenniel, illustrator (died 1914)
- 17 March – Jean Ingelow, poet and novelist (died 1897)
- 22 March – John Brown, cricketer (died 1893)
- 30 March – Anna Sewell, novelist (died 1878)
- 4 April – David Kirkaldy, engineer, pioneer of materials testing (died 1897)
- 27 April – Herbert Spencer, philosopher, political theorist and civil engineer (died 1903)
- 4 May – Joseph Whitaker, publisher (died 1895)
- 12 May – Florence Nightingale, nurse (died 1910)
- 22 May – Sir Watkin Williams-Wynn, 6th Baronet, politician (died 1885)
- 21 June – James Halliwell-Phillipps, bibliophile (died 1889)
- 22 June – Charles Lowder, Anglo-Catholic priest (died 1880)
- 5 July – William John Macquorn Rankine, Scottish physicist (died 1872)
- 9 July – John Wright Oakes, landscape painter (died 1887)
- 25 July – Henry Doulton, potter (died 1897)
- 6 August – Donald Smith, 1st Baron Strathcona and Mount Royal, Scottish-born entrepreneur, statesman and philanthropist (died 1914 in Canada)
- 13 August – George Grove, musicologist, Biblical scholar and civil engineer (died 1900)
- 23 November – Isaac Todhunter, mathematician (died 1884)
- 3 December – John Coleridge, Lord Chief Justice (died 1894)
- 10 December – Princess Elizabeth of Clarence (died 1821)

== Deaths ==
- 23 January – Prince Edward, Duke of Kent and Strathearn (born 1767)
- 29 January – King George III of the United Kingdom (born 1738)
- 5 February – William Drennan, Irish political radical, poet and physician (born 1754)
- 11 March – Benjamin West, painter (born 1738 in the Province of Pennsylvania)
- 2 April – Thomas Brown, philosopher and poet (born 1778)
- 1 May – Arthur Thistlewood, conspirator (born 1774)
- 30 May – William Bradley, Britain's tallest ever man (born 1787)
- 19 June – Sir Joseph Banks, naturalist and botanist (born 1743)
- 3 September – Benjamin Henry Latrobe, architect in the United States (born 1764)
- 4 September – Timothy Brown, banker, merchant and radical (born 1743 or 1744)
- 11 October – James Keir, Scottish geologist, chemist and industrialist (born 1735)
