= 1692 in England =

- Centuries: 15th; 16th; 17th; 18th; 19th
- Decades: 1670s; 1680s; 1690s; 1700s; 1710s
- See also: Other events of 1692

Events from the year 1692 in England.

== Incumbents ==
- Monarchs – William III and Mary II

== Events ==
- 19 February – Princess Anne leaves the court after quarrelling with her sister, Queen Mary.
- 2 May – first performance of Henry Purcell's semi-opera The Fairy-Queen at the Queen's Theatre, Dorset Garden, in London.
- 5 May – Queen Mary orders the imprisonment of John Churchill, 1st Duke of Marlborough for alleged treasonous support of the Jacobites.
- 29 May–4 June – War of the Grand Alliance: The threat of a French invasion of England is diminished by victory at the Battles of Barfleur and La Hogue.
- 3 August – War of the Grand Alliance: the allied forces of England and the Dutch Republic led by King William III of England are defeated at the Battle of Steenkerque.
- 8 September – an earthquake in Brabant of scale 5.8 is felt across the Low Countries, Germany and England.
- 22 November – first performance of Henry Purcell's Ode to St. Cecilia.

=== Undated ===
- c.200 collier ships are wrecked in a storm off Winterton Ness with the loss of around a thousand lives.
- An Act for encourageing the apprehending of Highway Men offers rewards for the apprehension of highwaymen.
- Lloyd's coffee house in London becomes the main office for marine insurance.
- First publication of the Anglo-Saxon Chronicle, as Chronicon Saxonicum, edited with a Latin translation by Edmund Gibson.

== Births ==
- 29 February – John Byrom, poet (died 1763)
- 18 May – Joseph Butler, bishop and philosopher (died 1752)
- 3 August – John Henley, minister (died 1759)
- John Huxham, surgeon (died 1768)

== Deaths ==
- 18 May – Elias Ashmole, antiquarian (born 1617)
- 4 October – Charles Fleetwood, Parliamentarian soldier and politician (born c. 1618)
- c. November? – Edmund Ludlow, last surviving regicide, exiled in Switzerland (born c. 1617)
- 19 November – Thomas Shadwell, poet and playwright (born c. 1642)
- 9 December – William Mountfort, actor and playwright (born c. 1664)
