= 1696 in England =

- Centuries: 15th; 16th; 17th; 18th; 19th
- Decades: 1670s; 1680s; 1690s; 1700s; 1710s
- See also: Other events of 1696

Events from the year 1696 in England.

== Incumbents ==
- Monarch – William III

== Events ==
- January
  - Great Recoinage of 1696: The Parliament of England passes the Recoinage Act.
  - Colley Cibber's play Love's Last Shift is first performed at the Theatre Royal, Drury Lane in London.
- 27 January – the ship HMS Royal Sovereign (formerly Sovereign of the Seas) catches fire and burns at Chatham, after 57 years of service.
- 15 February – a Jacobite assassination attempt against King William III is foiled.
- March – Habeas Corpus suspended during a Jacobite invasion scare.
- April – window tax introduced.
- May – Great Recoinage of 1696: Shortage of silver coinage results in the guinea being officially revalued at 21 shillings, instead of 30.
- 21 November – John Vanbrugh's play The Relapse, or Virtue in Danger first performed at the Theatre Royal, Drury Lane.

=== Undated ===
- Board of Trade and Plantations established.
- Main façades of Chatsworth House in Derbyshire completed in a pioneering English Baroque style.

== Publications ==
- Edward Lloyd probably begins publication of Lloyd's News, a predecessor of Lloyd's List, in London.
- Poets Nahum Tate and Nicholas Brady publish New Version of the Psalms of David ("Tate and Brady"), a metrical psalter.

== Births ==
- 27 June – William Pepperrell, colonial soldier (died 1759)
- 14 July – William Oldys, antiquarian and bibliographer (died 1761)
- 12 August – Maurice Greene, composer (died 1755)
- 13 October – John Hervey, 2nd Baron Hervey, statesman and writer (died 1743)
- 22 December – James Oglethorpe, general and founder of the state of Georgia as a colony (died 1785)

== Deaths ==
- 18 March – Robert Charnock, conspirator (born c. 1663)
- 30 April – Robert Plot, naturalist (born 1640)
- 28 May – William Gregory, politician and judge (born 1625)
- 30 May – Henry Capell, 1st Baron Capell, First Lord of the Admiralty (born 1638)
- 24 June – Philip Henry, minister (born 1631)
- 11 July – William Godolphin, politician (born 1635)
- 13 September – Caleb Banks, politician (born 1659)
- 8 December – Charles Porter, English-born judge (born 1631)
- 12 December – John Hampden (1653–1696), politician (born 1653)
