= 1686 in England =

- Centuries: 15th; 16th; 17th; 18th; 19th
- Decades: 1660s; 1670s; 1680s; 1690s; 1700s
- See also: Other events of 1686

Events from the year 1686 in England.

== Incumbents ==
- Monarch – James II

== Events ==
- 21 June – judgement in the case of Godden v. Hales affirms the king's power to exercise his dispensing powers granting exemptions from anti-Catholic legislation. Heneage Finch is dismissed as Solicitor General for his refusal to defend the king's case.
- 10 July – Court of Ecclesiastical Commission created.
- 17 July – King James appoints four Catholics to the Privy Council of England.
- 5 November – Bar Convent in York established, making it the oldest surviving active Catholic convent in England.

=== Undated ===
- A group of conspirators meet at Charborough House in Dorset to plan the overthrow of James II by Parliamentarians and the Dutch Stadtholder William III of Orange-Nassau (James's son-in-law).

== Publications ==
- Edmond Halley presents a systematic study of the trade winds and monsoons and identifies solar heating as the cause of atmospheric motions.
- John Playford publishes The Delightful Companion, containing the first publication of Henry Purcell's arrangement of "Lillibullero"; Thomas Wharton composes lyrics.
- Robert Plot publishes The Natural History of Staffordshire.

== Births ==
- 6 March – Christopher Packe, medical doctor and geologist (died 1749)
- 9 April – James Craggs the Younger, politician (died 1721)
- 29 April – Peregrine Bertie, 2nd Duke of Ancaster and Kesteven, statesman (died 1742)
- 5 June – Edward Howard, 9th Duke of Norfolk, aristocrat (died 1777; possibly born 1685)
- 12 August – John Balguy, philosopher (died 1748)
- 19 August – Eustace Budgell, writer (suicide 1737)
- 30 November – Richard Lumley, 2nd Earl of Scarbrough, Whig politician (suicide 1740)

=== Unknown dates ===
- Thomas Carte, historian (died 1754)
- George Clinton, naval officer, colonial governor and politician (died 1761)
- Giles Jacob, legal writer and literary critic (died 1744)
- William Law, clergyman (died 1761)

== Deaths ==
- 14 January – Sir Thomas Abdy, 1st Baronet, lawyer and landowner (born 1612)
- 19 January – Simon Digby, 4th Baron Digby, politician (born 1657)
- 10 February – Sir William Dugdale, antiquary (born 1605)
- 15 April – Sir Joseph Ashe, 1st Baronet, Whig politician and merchant (born 1618)
- 21 April – John Dolben, Archbishop of York (born 1625)
- 28 May – Paskah Rose, butcher, executioner and burglar (birth unknown)
- 23 June – Sir William Coventry, statesman (born c. 1628)
- 10 July – John Fell, Bishop of Oxford (born 1625)
- 16 July – John Pearson, theologian and scholar (born 1612)
- 28 July (bur.) – Thomas Watson, nonconformist Puritan preacher and author (born c. 1620)
- 26 October – John Egerton, 2nd Earl of Bridgewater, nobleman (born 1623)
- November – Jack Ketch, executioner employed by King Charles II (birth unknown)
- ca. November – John Playford, bookseller and music publisher (born 1623)
