= 1697 in England =

- Centuries: 15th; 16th; 17th; 18th; 19th
- Decades: 1670s; 1680s; 1690s; 1700s; 1710s
- See also: Other events of 1697

Events from the year 1697 in England.

== Incumbents ==
- Monarch – William III

== Events ==
- May – John Vanbrugh's comedy The Provoked Wife premières in London at Lincoln's Inn Fields Theatre.
- 15 May – 1697 Hertfordshire Hailstorm: violent hail storm across Hertfordshire, perhaps the most severe ever in Britain.
- 30 June – earliest known first-class cricket match takes place, in Sussex.
- 20 September – the Treaty of Ryswick ends the War of the Grand Alliance; France recognises William III as King of England.
- 2 December – first service (to celebrate the Treaty of Ryswick) held in St Paul's Cathedral since rebuilding work after the Great Fire of London began.
- Trade with Africa Act 1697 (An Act to settle the Trade to Africa) confirms the Royal African Company's loss of monopoly on the Atlantic slave trade, with effect from 1698.
- Poor Act 1697 requires badging of recipients of parish welfare.

== Publications ==
- William Dampier's A New Voyage Round the World, recording the author's adventures in Australasia.
- Daniel Defoe's An Essay upon Projects, favouring the implementation of income tax and the education of women.
- Francis Moore (astrologer) first publishes Old Moore's Almanack.

== Births ==
- 10 November – William Hogarth, artist (died 1764)

== Deaths ==
- 28 January – Sir John Fenwick, Jacobite conspirator, beheaded (born c. 1645)
- 27 March – Simon Bradstreet, colonial magistrate (born 1603)
- 8 May – Sir Richard Temple, 3rd Baronet, politician (born 1634)
- 7 June – John Aubrey, antiquary and memoirist (born 1626)
- 10 June – Francis Pemberton, Lord Chief Justice of the King's Bench (born 1624)
- 12 June – Ann Baynard, natural philosopher (born 1672)
- 19 June – Henry Mordaunt, 2nd Earl of Peterborough, diplomat (born 1621)
- 18 July – Thomas Dolman, politician (born 1622)
- 8 November – Samuel Enys, politician (born 1611)
- Undated – Mary Speke, nonconformist patron and political activist (born c. 1625)
- Probable year – Gilbert Clerke, mathematician, natural philosopher and theologian (born 1626)
