= 1699 in England =

- Centuries: 15th; 16th; 17th; 18th; 19th
- Decades: 1670s; 1680s; 1690s; 1700s; 1710s
- See also: Other events of 1699

Events from the year 1699 in England.

== Incumbents ==
- Monarch – William III

== Events ==
- January 19 – Parliament limits the size of the country's standing army to 7,000 "native born" men. The King's Dutch Blue Guards hence cannot serve in the line. By Act of February 1, it also requires disbandment of foreign troops in Ireland.
- May 10 – Billingsgate Fish Market in London is sanctioned as a permanent institution by Act of Parliament.
- June 11 – England, France and the Dutch Republic agree on the terms of the Second Partition Treaty for Spain.
- June 14 – Thomas Savery demonstrates his first steam pump to the Royal Society of London.
- October 3 – The Liverpool Merchant, the first slave ship from the port of Liverpool in England, departs to imprison captured West Africans and transport them to the British colonies, arriving in Barbados on September 18, 1700 with 220 slaves.

=== Undated ===
- Castle Howard in Yorkshire, designed by Sir John Vanbrugh and Nicholas Hawksmoor, is begun. It is one of the first significant English houses to incorporate corridors in the design.
- John Blow is appointed to the newly created post of Composer to the Chapel Royal.
- Edward Lhuyd produces the first published scientific treatment of what would now be recognized as a dinosaur, describing and naming a sauropod tooth, Rutellum implicatum found at Caswell, near Witney, Oxfordshire.

=== In fiction ===
- May 4 – the beginning of Gulliver's Travels (1726).

== Births ==
- January? – Frank Nicholls, English physician (died 1778)
- July 14 – Vere Beauclerk, 1st Baron Vere, English peer, politician and admiral (died 1781)
- August 13 (bapt.) – John Dyer, Welsh poet (died 1757)
- September 12 – John Martyn, English botanist (died 1768)
- September 29 – Charles Calvert, 5th Baron Baltimore, English noble and Proprietary Governor of the Province of Maryland (died 1751)
- November 2 – Thomas Holmes, 1st Baron Holmes, English Member of Parliament (died 1764)
- November 5 – Sir Merrik Burrell, 1st Baronet, English politician (died 1787)
- December 19 – William Bowyer, English printer (died 1777)

=== Unknown dates ===
- Matthew Brettingham, English architect (died 1769)
- William Godolphin, Marquess of Blandford, nobleman and politician (died 1731)
- Colonel Joshua Fry, English-born surveyor, adventurer, mapmaker, member of the House of Burgesses, and colonel in the American colonies (died 1754)

== Deaths ==
- January 21 – Obadiah Walker, academic and Master of University College, Oxford from 1676 to 1688 (born 1616)
- January 27 – Sir William Temple, 1st Baronet, statesman and essayist (born 1628)
- February 1 – Sir Thomas Chicheley, politician (born c. 1618)
- February 27 – Charles Paulet, 1st Duke of Bolton, politician (born c. 1625)
- March 27 – Edward Stillingfleet, theologian (born 1635)
- June 22 – Sir Josiah Child, merchant, economist, politician and governor of the East India Company (born 1630)
- October 8 (buried) – Mary Beale, portrait painter (born 1633)
