= 1689 in England =

- Centuries: 15th; 16th; 17th; 18th; 19th
- Decades: 1660s; 1670s; 1680s; 1690s; 1700s
- See also: Other events of 1689

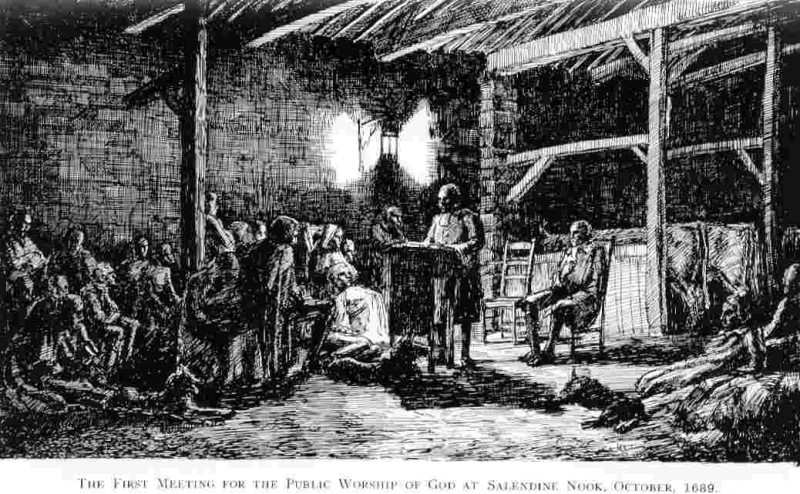
The First Meeting for the Public Worship of God at Salendine Nook, October 1689

Events from the year 1689 in England.

== Incumbents ==
- Monarchs – William III and Mary II (starting 13 February)

== Events ==
- 12 January – a powerful storm causes significant damage in London and southeast England.
- 22 January – the Convention Parliament is convened to determine if James II, the last Roman Catholic king, had vacated the throne when he fled to France at the end of 1688.
- 6 February – the Convention Parliament reads the Declaration of Right to William of Orange and his wife, Mary (daughter of the exiled James II) in formally offering them the throne.
- 13 February – William III and Mary II are proclaimed co-rulers of England, Scotland and Ireland in a ceremony at the Guildhall in the City of London but are not yet recognised in Scotland or Ireland.
- 12 March – start of the Williamite War in Ireland: James II lands at Kinsale with 6,000 French soldiers and marches for Dublin.
- April – great fire at St Ives, Huntingdonshire; also this year there is a major fire in Morpeth, Northumberland.
- 11 April – crowning of William and Mary as King and Queen of England, Scotland and Ireland at Westminster Abbey by the Bishop of London, Henry Compton. Ireland does not yet recognise them.
- 18 April
  - Williamite War in Ireland: Siege of Derry: James II arrives at the gates of Derry and asks for its surrender. This is refused by Majors Henry Baker and George Walker, who have taken over command of its defences from the Governor Robert Lundy.
  - Boston Revolt: Governor of the Dominion of New England Sir Edmund Andros and other officials are overthrown by a mob in Boston.
- 1 May (11 May N.S.) – Williamite War in Ireland: Battle of Bantry Bay between the English Royal Navy under the Earl of Torrington and the French fleet under the Marquis de Châteaurenault. The French are able to protect their transports unloading supplies for James II and withdraw unpursued.
- 12 May – King William's War: William joins the Grand Alliance (League of Augsburg), starting the war (the North American theatre of the Nine Years' War).
- 24 May – the Toleration Act passed by Parliament protecting freedom of worship for Protestant Nonconformists (Roman Catholics and nontrinitarians are intentionally excluded). This effectively concludes the Glorious Revolution.
- 25 May – last collection of hearth tax; it is replaced by a poll tax.
- 25 July
  - Abolition of Council of Wales and the Marches.
  - Regicide Edmund Ludlow sets out from Switzerland to form a nucleus of supporters of the Good Old Cause in London, but is forced back into exile in November.
- 27 July – first Jacobite rising: Scottish Covenanter supporters of William and Mary (under Hugh Mackay) are defeated by Jacobite supporters of James at the Battle of Killiecrankie but the latter's leader, John Graham, Viscount Dundee, is killed.
- 28 July – relief of the Siege of Derry after 105 days: English sailors break through a floating boom across the River Foyle to end the Siege.
- 1 August – nonjuring schism in the Church of England: Archbishop of Canterbury William Sancroft, along with eight bishops and around 400 other clergymen, is suspended for refusing to swear allegiance to William and Mary. He is dismissed from office the following year.
- 21 August – first Jacobite rising: Battle of Dunkeld: Covenanter Cameronians defeat the Jacobites in Scotland.
- 27 August – a Williamite force sailing from England takes the Jacobite port of Carrickfergus in County Antrim.
- 16 December – the Bill of Rights (An Act Declaring the Rights and Liberties of the Subject and Settling the Succession of the Crown), drawn up by the Convention Parliament, receives royal assent; it will remain substantially in force into the 21st century.

=== Undated ===
- Supporters of William seize Liverpool Castle.
- Thomas Shadwell becomes Poet Laureate and Historiographer Royal.
- The march Lillibullero is first published in its present form by Henry Purcell in his compilation Music's Handmaid; the satirical text is attributed to Thomas Wharton.
- The first documented performance of the opera Dido and Aeneas by Henry Purcell takes place at Josias Priest's girls' school in Chelsea, London, with a libretto based on Virgil's Aeneid.
- Windsor Guildhall in Berkshire, designed by Sir Thomas Fitz (or Fiddes), is completed by Christopher Wren.
- Gardens at Levens Hall in the north-west begin to be laid out; the plan remains substantially unaltered into the 21st century and includes one of the country's earliest ha-has.

== Publications ==
- John Locke's Two Treatises of Government; A Letter Concerning Toleration; and An Essay Concerning Human Understanding (the first two anonymously; the latter dated 1690).

== Births ==
- c. 23 February – Samuel Bellamy, pirate captain (died 1717 in shipwreck)
- 24 May – Daniel Finch, 8th Earl of Winchilsea, politician (died 1769)
- 26 May – Lady Mary Wortley Montagu, writer (died 1762)
- 24 July – William, Duke of Gloucester (died 1700)
- 19 August – Samuel Richardson, writer (died 1761)
- Henrietta Howard, Countess of Suffolk, née Hobart, mistress of King George II and patron of the arts (died 1767)

== Deaths ==
- 6 January – Bishop Seth Ward, mathematician and astronomer (born 1617)
- 18 March – John Dixwell, judge (born 1607)
- 16 April – Aphra Behn, author (born 1640)
- 18 April – Judge Jeffreys, Lord Chief Justice (born 1648)
- 25 June – William Thomas, bishop (born 1613)
- 29 December – Thomas Sydenham, physician (born 1624)
