= 1700 in England =

- Centuries: 15th; 16th; 17th; 18th; 19th
- Decades: 1680s; 1690s; 1700s; 1710s; 1720s
- See also: Other events of 1700

Events from the year 1700 in England.

== Incumbents ==
- Monarch – William III

== Events ==
- 27 February – The island of New Britain is discovered by William Dampier in the western Pacific.
- early March – William Congreve's comedy The Way of the World is first performed at the New Theatre, Lincoln's Inn Fields.
- 24 March – Treaty of London signed between France, England and the Dutch Republic.
- 24 June – Responsibility for vagrants passes from churchwardens to parish constables under terms of the Vagrant Removal Costs Act (1698).
- 30 July – Princess Anne's only surviving child, Prince William, Duke of Gloucester, dies aged eleven of "a malignant fever" at Windsor Castle, leaving the Protestant succession to the British throne in doubt.
- September – While in the Netherlands, William III meets his cousin Sophia at Het Loo Palace. This is a precursor to the Act of Settlement of the following year that opens the way to the future succession of the House of Hanover.
- 6 September – Edmond Halley returns to England after a voyage of almost one year on HMS Paramour, from which he has observed the Antarctic Convergence, and publishes his findings on terrestrial magnetism in General Chart of the Variation of the Compass.
- 20 November – First boats reach Leeds from the tideway by way of the Aire and Calder Navigation.
- 19 December – The 4th Parliament of King William III is dissolved and new elections are ordered by the King.
- 25 December – First Christmas hymn authorised to be sung in the Anglican church, "While Shepherds Watched Their Flocks", the words by Nahum Tate having been first published this year, in a supplement to "Tate and Brady".
- 28 December – Laurence Hyde, 1st Earl of Rochester is appointed Lord Lieutenant of Ireland.
- Approximate date – Jeremiah Clarke writes the Prince of Denmark's March.

== Births ==
- 29 March – Charles Cornwallis, 1st Earl Cornwallis (died 1762)
- April – John Wyatt, inventor (died 1766)
- 4 May (bapt.) – Joseph Adams, chief factor of the Hudson's Bay Company (died 1737)
- 14 May – Mary Delany, Bluestocking, artist and writer (died 1788)
- 13 July – John Dandridge, colonel and planter in Virginia (died 1756)
- 20 September – Benedict Leonard Calvert, Governor of Maryland (died 1732)
- 26 September? – Mary Hervey, née Lepell, courtier (died 1768)
- 13 October – Phanuel Bacon, playwright, poet and author (died 1783)
- 31 October – Joseph Blake, alias Blueskin, highwayman (executed 1724)
- 28 November – Nathaniel Bliss, Astronomer Royal (died 1764)

=== Full date unknown ===
- John Cecil, 7th Earl of Exeter, peer (died 1722)
- William Craven, 3rd Baron Craven, nobleman (died 1739)
- Emanuel Howe, 2nd Viscount Howe, politician and colonial administrator (died 1735)
- John Immyns, attorney and lutenist (died 1764)
- Charles Jennens, landowner and patron of the arts (died 1773)

== Deaths ==
- 16–27 January – John Dormer, born Huddleston, Jesuit priest (born 1636)
- 21 January – Henry Somerset, 1st Duke of Beaufort (born 1629)
- 14 March – Henry Killigrew, dramatist (born 1613)
- 12 May – John Dryden, poet (born 1631)
- 10 July – John Lowther, 1st Viscount Lonsdale, politician (born 1655)
- 19 July (date found dead) – Thomas Creech, translator (born 1659; suicide)
- 29 July – Prince William, Duke of Gloucester (born 1689)
- 8 August – Joseph Moxon, mathematician and lexicographer (born 1627)
- 7 September – William Russell, 1st Duke of Bedford, peer and soldier (born 1616)
