= 1691 in England =

- Centuries: 15th; 16th; 17th; 18th; 19th
- Decades: 1670s; 1680s; 1690s; 1700s; 1710s
- See also: Other events of 1691

Events from the year 1691 in England.

== Incumbents ==
- Monarchs – William III and Mary II

== Events ==
- April – John Tillotson enthroned as Archbishop of Canterbury.
- 9 April – a fire at the Palace of Whitehall in London destroys its Stone Gallery.
- June – first performance of the semi-opera King Arthur with a libretto by John Dryden and music by Henry Purcell.
- 3 September – HMS Coronation and HMS Harwich are lost in a storm while making for shelter in Plymouth Sound with 900 killed.
- 18 September – War of the Grand Alliance: English and Dutch forces defeated by the French at the Battle of Leuze.
- 3 October – the Treaty of Limerick ends the Williamite War in Ireland. The Flight of the Wild Geese – the departure of the Jacobite army – follows.

== Births ==
- 27 February – Edward Cave, editor and publisher (died 1754)
- 29 September – Richard Challoner, Catholic prelate (died 1781)
- 1 October – Arthur Onslow, politician (died 1768)

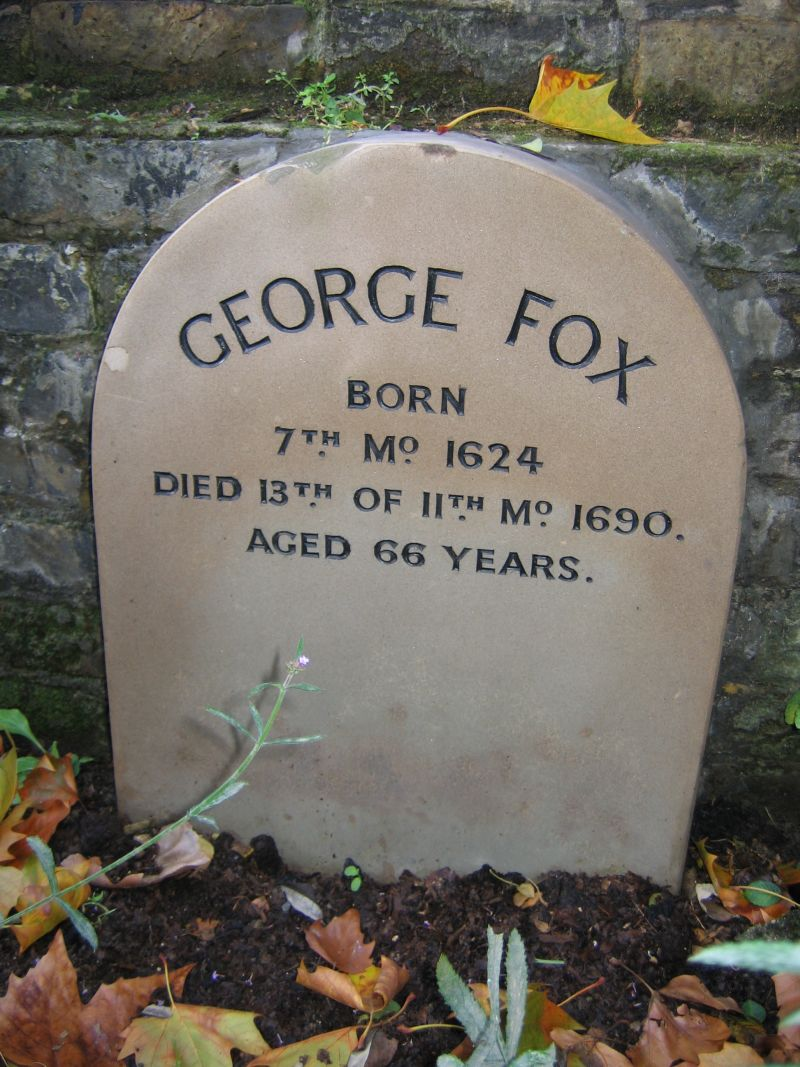
George Fox is buried under an appropriately simple grave marker (11th month 1690 translates to January 1691 in the new style calendar)

== Deaths ==
- 13 January – George Fox, founder of the Quakers (born 1624)
- 17 January – Richard Lower, physician (born 1631)
- 11 May – John Birch, soldier (born 1615)
- 3 June – Tom Cox, "The Handsome Highwayman" (born c. 1666; hanged)
- 10 September – Edward Pococke, Orientalist and biblical scholar (born 1604)
- 9 October – William Sacheverell, statesman (born 1638)
- 8 December – Richard Baxter, clergyman (born 1615)
- probable – Elizabeth Polwheele, playwright (born c. 1651)
