= 1768 in Scotland =

- Centuries: 16th; 17th; 18th; 19th; 20th
- Decades: 1740s; 1750s; 1760s; 1770s; 1780s
- See also: List of years in Scotland; Timeline of Scottish history 1768 in: Great Britain • Wales • Elsewhere

Events from the year 1768 in Scotland.

== Incumbents ==
=== Law officers ===
- Lord Advocate – James Montgomery
- Solicitor General for Scotland – Henry Dundas

=== Judiciary ===
- Lord President of the Court of Session – Lord Arniston, the younger
- Lord Justice General – Duke of Queensberry
- Lord Justice Clerk – Lord Barskimming

== Events ==
- Construction of Forth and Clyde Canal begins (Act 8 March).
- 10 December – first volumes of Encyclopædia Britannica begin publication in Edinburgh.
- Bridge over River Deveron between Banff and Macduff swept away in flood.
- David Dale begins his own business importing linen yarn from the Dutch Republic to Glasgow.
- Duchal House extended.
- Alloa Waggonway open.

== Births ==
- 2 May – Zachary Macaulay, abolitionist and statistician (died 1838 in London)
- 3 May – Charles Tennant, chemist and industrialist (died 1838)
- 9 May – James Thomson, Presbyterian minister and editor of Encyclopædia Britannica (died 1855 in London)
- 11 May – David Hamilton, Glasgow architect (died 1843)
- 14 July – James Haldane, soldier and evangelist (died 1851)
- 29 August (bapt.) – William Erskine, Lord Kinneder, scholar and songwriter (died 1822)
- 23 September – William Wallace, mathematician (died 1843)
- 6 November – James Hay Beattie, poet (died 1790)
- 10 November – Thomas Thomson, advocate, antiquarian and archivist (died 1852)

== Deaths ==
- 15 June – James Short, mathematician and optician (born 1710)
- 1 October – Robert Simson, mathematician (born 1687)
- 12 October – James Douglas, 14th Earl of Morton, astronomer (born 1702)
