= 1774 in Scotland =

- Centuries: 16th; 17th; 18th; 19th; 20th
- Decades: 1750s; 1760s; 1770s; 1780s; 1790s
- See also: List of years in Scotland; Timeline of Scottish history 1774 in: Great Britain • Wales • Elsewhere

Events from the year 1774 in Scotland.

== Incumbents ==
=== Law officers ===
- Lord Advocate – James Montgomery
- Solicitor General for Scotland – Henry Dundas

=== Judiciary ===
- Lord President of the Court of Session – Lord Arniston, the younger
- Lord Justice General – Duke of Queensberry
- Lord Justice Clerk – Lord Barskimming

== Events ==
- 27 June – foundation stone of General Register House in Edinburgh, designed by Robert Adam, is laid; the building will not be opened until 1788.
- Dundas House in New Town, Edinburgh, designed by William Chambers, is completed.
- Punitive laws against the Clan Gregor are repealed.
- Roman Catholic chapel built on the site that will become St Peter's Church, Aberdeen.
- The Schiehallion experiment is carried by Nevil Maskelyne out to determine the mean density of the Earth.

== Births ==
- 24 February – Archibald Constable, publisher (died 1827)
- 26 February – William Farquhar, soldier and administrator in the East India Company (died 1839)
- 3 June – Robert Tannahill, weaver poet (died 1810)
- 8 October – Henry Duncan, (Free) Church of Scotland minister, geologist and social reformer; founder of the savings bank movement (died 1846)
- 4 November – Robert Allan, weaver poet (died 1841 in New York)
- 8 November – Robert Reid, royal architect (died 1856)
- 12 November – Charles Bell, anatomist (died 1842 in England)
- 24 November – Thomas Dick, Secession Church minister and scientist (died 1857)
- Robert Thom, hydraulic engineer (died 1847)

== Deaths ==
- 19 January – Thomas Gillespie, Presbyterian minister (born 1708)
- 16 October – Robert Fergusson, Scottish poet (born 1750; died in bedlam following head injury)

== The arts ==
- During this year's harvest, 15-year-old farm labourer Robert Burns is assisted by his contemporary Nelly Kilpatrick who inspires his first attempt at poetry, "O, Once I Lov'd A Bonnie Lass".

== Sport ==
- Musselburgh Golf Club established on Levenhall Links and the Old Club Cup is played for the first time.

== See also ==
- Timeline of Scottish history
