= 1862 in Scotland =

- Centuries: 17th; 18th; 19th; 20th; 21st
- Decades: 1840s; 1850s; 1860s; 1870s; 1880s
- See also: List of years in Scotland; Timeline of Scottish history 1862 in: The UK • Wales • Elsewhere

Events from the year 1862 in Scotland.

== Incumbents ==
=== Law officers ===
- Lord Advocate – James Moncreiff
- Solicitor General for Scotland – Edward Maitland; then George Young

=== Judiciary ===
- Lord President of the Court of Session and Lord Justice General – Lord Colonsay
- Lord Justice Clerk – Lord Glenalmond

== Events ==
- 24 February – St Abb's Head lighthouse first illuminated. Butt of Lewis Lighthouse is also completed this year.
- May
  - Around 40% of the Fair Isle population migrates to New Brunswick.
  - The 10.00 a.m. "Special Scotch Express", predecessor of the Flying Scotsman express train, first departs from London King's Cross railway station for Edinburgh Waverley over the East Coast Main Line.
- 1 June – the 10.00 a.m. passenger service, predecessor of the Royal Scot express train, first departs from London Euston railway station for Glasgow over the West Coast Main Line.
- July – the Glasgow & Stranraer Steam Packet Company's PS Briton enters service on the first Stranraer to Larne ferry service.
- 28 August – the Portpatrick Railway opens to Portpatrick; on 1 October it opens its branch to Stranraer Harbour.
- 31 August – last mail coach runs from Carlisle to Hawick.
- 20 September – SS Irishman runs aground on Skernataid Rock between the islands of Raasay and Scalpay, Inner Hebrides.
- 11 October – Jessie M'Lachlan, having been found guilty in the Sandyford murder case in Glasgow, is to be hanged, but has her sentence commuted to life imprisonment.
- 13 October – Winchburgh rail crash: A head-on collision on the Edinburgh and Glasgow Railway kills 15.
- 18 December – "Day of the Great Drowning": 31 men, the entire crews of five fishing boats from Ness, Lewis, are drowned in a storm.
- Prime gilt, a duty levied by Trinity House of Leith on goods coming into the port, is abolished.
- Henry Littlejohn becomes Edinburgh's first Medical Officer of Health, serving until 1908.
- David Kirkaldy publishes Results of an Experimental Inquiry into the Comparative Tensile Strength and other properties of various kinds of Wrought-Iron and Steel in Glasgow describing his pioneering work in tensile testing.
- Bishop Robert Eden is elected Primus of the Scottish Episcopal Church, an office he will hold until his death in 1886.
- Establishment of Anderson High School (Shetland) in Lerwick.
- Tom Morris Sr. wins The Open Championship at Prestwick Golf Club, Ayrshire.
- First Aberdeen Angus herd book created.
- Inverewe Garden created by Osgood Mackenzie in Wester Ross.

== Births ==
- 1 January – Andrew Blain Baird, engineer and aviation pioneer (died 1951)
- 28 June – William Younger, politician (died 1937)
- 11 August – David Henderson, British Army officer (died 1921 in Switzerland)
- 29 August – Andrew Fisher, Prime Minister of Australia (died 1928 in England)
- 21 October – Donald Murray, Liberal Party Member of Parliament for the Western Isles from 1918 to 1922 (died 1923)
- 26 October – David Anderson, Lord St Vigeans, Scottish advocate and judge, Chairman of the Scottish Land Court 1918–34 (died 1948)

== Deaths ==
- 24 September – William Forbes Mackenzie, Conservative politician and temperance reformer (born 1807 in England)
- 29 June – James Bowman Lindsay, inventor (born 1799)

== See also ==
- Timeline of Scottish history
- 1862 in Ireland
