= 1770 in Scotland =

- Centuries: 16th; 17th; 18th; 19th; 20th
- Decades: 1750s; 1760s; 1770s; 1780s; 1790s
- See also: List of years in Scotland; Timeline of Scottish history 1770 in: Great Britain • Wales • Elsewhere

Events from the year 1770 in Scotland.

== Incumbents ==
=== Law officers ===
- Lord Advocate – James Montgomery
- Solicitor General for Scotland – Henry Dundas

=== Judiciary ===
- Lord President of the Court of Session – Lord Arniston, the younger
- Lord Justice General – Duke of Queensberry
- Lord Justice Clerk – Lord Barskimming

== Events ==
- 12 April – Monkland Canal authorized.
- 9 March – Haggis is served on board Captain James Cook's ship HMS Endeavour, anchored off New Zealand, in celebration of the birthday of a Scottish officer on board, Cook himself having a Scottish father.
- 14 November – Scottish explorer James Bruce is shown the source of the Blue Nile in Ethiopia.
- Emigrants from the Highland Clearances in the Hebrides migrate to Prince Edward Island, and to Glasgow where the Gaelic-speaking congregation of St Columba Church of Scotland is formed.
- Montgomery's Entail Act remedies the system of short leases on agricultural properties.
- Plans for improvement of the harbour at Dundee proposed by John Smeaton and Glasgow Town Council begins deepening the navigable River Clyde.
- Approximate date
  - Bridge at Bridge of Weir constructed at Burngill.
  - Harbour at Charlestown, Fife, begun by Charles Bruce, 5th Earl of Elgin.
  - The Fordell Railway constructed in Fife.

== Births ==
- 2 February – George Gordon, 5th Duke of Gordon, nobleman, soldier and politician (died 1836 in London)
- c. 25 March – Alexander Carse, genre painter (died 1843)
- 18 April – William Nicol, geologist (died 1851)
- 9 December (bapt.) – James Hogg, "the Ettrick Shepherd", poet and novelist (died 1835)

== Deaths ==
- c. January – William Falconer, poet and marine dictionary compiler (born 1732; lost at sea)
- 27 July – Robert Dinwiddie, colonial Governor of Virginia (born 1693; died in Virginia)
- 1 November – Alexander Cruden, Biblical scholar (born 1699; died in London)
- 9 November – John Campbell, 4th Duke of Argyll, Whig politician (born c. 1693)
- 5 December – James Stirling, mathematician (born 1692)
- Approximate date – Alasdair mac Mhaighstir Alasdair, Gaelic poet (born c. 1698)

== The arts ==
- David Dalrymple's anthology of Ancient Scottish Poems is published.

== See also ==
- Timeline of Scottish history
