= 1858 in Scotland =

- Centuries: 17th; 18th; 19th; 20th; 21st
- Decades: 1830s; 1840s; 1850s; 1860s; 1870s
- See also: List of years in Scotland; Timeline of Scottish history 1858 in: The UK • Wales • Elsewhere

Events from the year 1858 in Scotland.

== Incumbents ==
=== Law officers ===
- Lord Advocate – James Moncreiff until March; then John Inglis until July; then Charles Baillie
- Solicitor General for Scotland – Edward Maitland; then Charles Baillie; then David Mure

=== Judiciary ===
- Lord President of the Court of Session and Lord Justice General – Lord Colonsay
- Lord Justice Clerk – Lord Glencorse, then Lord Glenalmond

== Events ==
- 1 January – the permanent North Unst Lighthouse on Muckle Flugga (Shetland), designed by brothers Thomas and David Stevenson, is first illuminated.
- 16 April – the Wernerian Natural History Society of Edinburgh is wound up.
- 31 August – Bressay Lighthouse in Shetland is first illuminated.
- 26 October – launch of Fraserburgh life-boat, the first in Scotland under the auspices of the Royal National Lifeboat Institution.
- Completion of Hamilton Mausoleum.
- Reconstruction of Paisley Abbey begins.
- Temperate Palm House at Royal Botanic Garden Edinburgh built.
- The West of Scotland Grand National, predecessor of the Scottish Grand National, is first run, at a course near Houston, Renfrewshire.

== Births ==
- 14 March – George Henry, painter (died 1943)
- 10 April – Arthur Melville, painter of Oriental subjects (died 1904)
- 11 May – Richard Archer Prince, born Richard Millar Archer, actor and murderer (died 1937 in Broadmoor Criminal Lunatic Asylum)
- 7 December – Ned Haig, butcher and rugby union player notable for founding the sport of rugby sevens (died 1939)

== Deaths ==
- 15 February – John Gray, owner of Greyfriars Bobby
- 19 February – Alexander Black, architect (born c.1790)
- 24 February – Thomas Hamilton, architect (born 1784)
- 10 June – Robert Brown, botanist and palaeobotanist (born 1773)
- 20 June – James Jardine, hydraulic engineer (born 1776)
- 16 September – John Macgregor, shipbuilder (born 1802)

== The arts ==
- 24 March – the Scottish National Gallery on The Mound in Edinburgh opens.
- August – German writer Theodor Fontane tours Scotland.
- E. B. Ramsay's Reminiscences of Scottish Life and Character is published.

== See also ==
- Timeline of Scottish history
- 1858 in Ireland
