= 1925 in Scotland =

- Centuries: 18th; 19th; 20th; 21st
- Decades: 1900s; 1910s; 1920s; 1930s; 1940s
- See also: List of years in Scotland; Timeline of Scottish history 1925 in: The UK • Wales • Elsewhere; Scottish football: 1924–25 • 1925–26

Events from the year 1925 in Scotland.

== Incumbents ==
- Secretary for Scotland and Keeper of the Great Seal – Sir John Gilmour, Bt

=== Law officers ===
- Lord Advocate – William Watson
- Solicitor General for Scotland – David Fleming until December; then Alexander Munro MacRobert

=== Judiciary ===
- Lord President of the Court of Session and Lord Justice General – Lord Clyde
- Lord Justice Clerk – Lord Alness
- Chairman of the Scottish Land Court – Lord St Vigeans

== Events ==
- 18 April – the dam of Skelmorlie reservoir bursts, flooding the village and killing 5.
- 21 March – Murrayfield Stadium in Edinburgh, home of the Scottish Rugby Union, opens with Scotland defeating England 14-11.
- 16 May – the war memorial on the Law, Dundee, is inaugurated.
- 7 July – the original Kelvin Hall in Glasgow is destroyed by fire.
- 7 August – National Library of Scotland established by Act of Parliament to take over the national responsibilities of the Advocates' Library in Edinburgh.
- 2 October – John Logie Baird successfully transmits the first television pictures with a greyscale image, in London.
- 29 December – Alexander Munro MacRobert appointed Solicitor General for Scotland, replacing David Fleming
- The uninhabited Shiant Isles are acquired by writer and island-lover Compton Mackenzie.

== Births ==
- 28 January – Michael Scott Weir, diplomat, Arabist (died 2006)
- 1 February – Bobby Laing, professional footballer (died 1985)
- 15 February – Eric Brown, professional golfer (died 1986)
- 18 February – Russell Hunter, actor (died 2004)
- 1 April – Walter Carr, actor (died 1998)
- 2 April – George MacDonald Fraser, author, notable for The Flashman Papers (died 2008 in the Isle of Man)
- 5 April – John Boyd, milliner, based in London (died 2018)
- 6 May – Angus Black, international rugby union player (died 2018)
- 29 May – Mick McGahey, Communist miners' leader (died 1999)
- 3 June – Thomas Winning, Archbishop of Glasgow and Cardinal (died 2001)
- 19 June – Robert Fyfe, actor (died 2021)
- 25 July – Duncan Johnstone, bagpiper and composer (died 1999)
- 30 July – Alexander Trocchi, novelist (died 1984)
- 4 September – John McKenzie, footballer (died 2017)
- 13 September – Ian Hamilton, lawyer and nationalist (died 2022)
- 28 October – Ian Hamilton Finlay, poet and sculptor (died 2006)
- 26 November – Phil McCall, actor (died 2002)
- 30 December – Ian MacNaughton, actor and television comedy director/producer (died 2002)
- John Quigley, author (died 2021)

== Deaths ==
- 11 January – John Sinclair, 1st Baron Pentland, Liberal Party MP, soldier, peer and administrator (born 1860)
- 14 January – David MacRitchie, folklorist and antiquarian (born 1851)
- 25 April – John Quinton Pringle, painter (born 1864)
- July – James Seth, philosopher (born 1860)
- 25 October – Henry J. Watt, experimental psychologist (born 1879)

== The arts ==
- John Buchan's novel John Macnab is published.
- Hugh MacDiarmid's synthetic Scots poetry Sangshaw is published.

== See also ==
- Timeline of Scottish history
- 1925 in Northern Ireland
