= 1916 in Scotland =

- Centuries: 18th; 19th; 20th; 21st
- Decades: 1890s; 1900s; 1910s; 1920s; 1930s
- See also: List of years in Scotland; Timeline of Scottish history 1916 in: The UK • Wales • Elsewhere; Scottish football: 1915–16 • 1916–17

Events from the year 1916 in Scotland.

== Incumbents ==
- Secretary for Scotland and Keeper of the Great Seal – Thomas McKinnon Wood until 9 July; Harold Tennant until 5 December; then Robert Munro

=== Law officers ===
- Lord Advocate – Robert Munro; then James Avon Clyde
- Solicitor General for Scotland – Thomas Brash Morison

=== Judiciary ===
- Lord President of the Court of Session and Lord Justice General – Lord Strathclyde
- Lord Justice Clerk – Lord Dickson
- Chairman of the Scottish Land Court – Lord Kennedy

== Events ==
- 6 January – HMS King Edward VII sinks off Cape Wrath, having struck a mine laid by SMS Möwe; all but one of the crew survive.
- 15 February – 27-year-old Edinburgh-born Black Watch private John Docherty is shot at dawn at Mazingarbe abattoir on the Western Front (World War I) for desertion, the first Kitchener's Army volunteer executed.
- 2–3 April – World War I: Imperial German Navy Zeppelins bomb Leith and Edinburgh, killing 13.
- 30 May – World War I: Ships of the Royal Navy's Grand Fleet put out from Scapa Flow to engage with the Imperial German Navy's High Seas Fleet; the Battle of Jutland is joined next day.
- 5 June – HMS Hampshire sinks off Orkney, probably having struck a German mine, with the loss of 650 lives – including Lord Kitchener and his staff – and only 13 survivors.
- 25 July – North of Scotland Special Military Area declared, restricting access by non-residents to everywhere north of the Great Glen.
- c.23 August–25 October – Dyce Work Camp for conscientious objectors working in the granite quarries operates.
- 31 December – Douglas Haig is promoted to Field marshal.
- The white-tailed sea eagle last breeds in the UK, on Skye (prior to reintroduction).

== Births ==
- 11 May – Edward Boyd, screenwriter (died 1989)
- 20 May – John McIntyre, theologian and Church of Scotland minister (died 2005)
- 16 June – John Young, actor (died 1996)
- 10 July – Harry Gourlay, Labour MP from 1959 (died 1987)
- 11 August – Benny Lee, comedy actor and singer (died 1995)
- 18 October – Anthony Dawson, actor (died 1992)
- 22 October – Peter Brodie, Church of Scotland minister, Moderator of the General Assembly (died 1996)
- 28 October – Jessie Kesson, born Jessie Grant McDonald, writer and radio producer (died 1994)
- 21 November – David Syme Russell, theologian and author (died 2010 in Bristol)
- 7 November – Ian Niall, born John McNeillie, author (died 2002 in England)
- 18 December – Douglas Fraser, union leader (died 2008 in the United States)
- Angus McPhee, outsider artist (died 1997)

== Deaths ==
- 21 January – David Finlay, soldier, recipient of the Victoria Cross; killed in action in Mesopotamia (born 1893)
- 6 March – Sir James Key Caird, jute manufacturer and benefactor (born 1837)
- 6 April – Andrew Ross, Scotland rugby union international and merchant seaman; killed in action in France (born c. 1880)
- 3 May – William Hardie, classical scholar, Professor of Humanity at Edinburgh University from 1895 (born 1862)
- 27 May – William Leiper, architect (born 1839)
- 1 July – James Youll Turnbull, soldier, recipient of the Victoria Cross; killed in action in France (born 1883)
- 23 July – William Ramsay, recipient of the Nobel Prize in Chemistry in 1904 (born 1852)
- 3 October – James Burgess, archaeologist active in India (born 1832)
- 26 November – Alexander Robertson MacEwen, writer, minister, professor and Moderator of the United Free Church of Scotland (born 1851)

== The arts ==
- July–October – during the Battle of the Somme on the Western Front (World War I), Cameron Highlander Dòmhnall Ruadh Chorùna composes the Gaelic love song An Eala Bhàn ("The White Swan") in the oral literature tradition.
- c. November – the Incorporation of Architects in Scotland is founded in Edinburgh.
- Joseph Lee's Ballads of Battle is published.

== See also ==
- Timeline of Scottish history
- 1916 in Ireland
