= 1859 in Scotland =

- Centuries: 17th; 18th; 19th; 20th; 21st
- Decades: 1830s; 1840s; 1850s; 1860s; 1870s
- See also: List of years in Scotland; Timeline of Scottish history 1859 in: The UK • Wales • Elsewhere

Events from the year 1859 in Scotland.

== Incumbents ==
=== Law officers ===
- Lord Advocate – Charles Baillie until April; then David Mure until June; then James Moncreiff
- Solicitor General for Scotland – David Mure; then George Patton; then Edward Maitland

=== Judiciary ===
- Lord President of the Court of Session and Lord Justice General – Lord Colonsay
- Lord Justice Clerk – Lord Glenalmond

== Events ==
- 2 February – a Crinan Canal reservoir dam bursts.
- 21 April – the Dunfermline Press begins publication.
- 14 October – Glasgow Town Council's Loch Katrine public water supply scheme officially opened.
- 23 December – National Museum of Antiquities of Scotland, a predecessor of the National Museum of Scotland, officially inaugurated in Queen Street, Edinburgh.
- Muirkirk becomes the first town in Britain to have gas lighting.
- St. Cuthbert's Co-operative Society opens its first shop in Edinburgh.
- Robertson's "Golden Shred" marmalade first produced, in Paisley.
- First whaler purpose-built with a steam engine, the Narwhal from Stephen's shipyard at Dundee.

== Births ==
- 27 January – James Grierson, British Army lieutenant general (died on service 1914 in France)
- 8 March – Kenneth Grahame, author best known for The Wind in the Willows (died 1932 in England)
- 10 March – Dugald Sutherland MacColl, painter and curator (died 1948 in London)
- 25 March – John Bruce Glasier, socialist politician (died 1920)
- 22 May – Arthur Conan Doyle, physician and fiction writer best known for his stories about the fictional detective Sherlock Holmes (died 1930 in England)
- 10 June – James Guthrie, painter (died 1930)
- 8 July – Annie Shepherd Swan, novelist (died 1943)
- 9 September – William James Cullen, Lord Cullen, judge (died 1941)
- 24 September – S. R. Crockett, novelist (died 1914 in France)
- 25 October – Allan MacDonald, Roman Catholic priest, poet, folklore collector and activist (died 1905)
- 18 November – James Nairn, painter (died 1904 in New Zealand)
- Thomas Corsan Morton, painter (died 1928)

== Deaths ==
- 6 February – Jane Stirling, pianist, student of Chopin (born 1804)
- 21 March – Angus MacKay, piper (born 1813)
- 19 September – John Pringle Nichol, scientist (born 1804)
- 22 September – William Alison, physician and social reformer (born 1790)
- 20 November – Mountstuart Elphinstone, statesman and historian (born 1779)
- 22 November – George Wilson, chemist and professor of technology (born 1818)

== The arts ==
- 26 August – Jules Verne arrives in Edinburgh to begin his first visit to Scotland.
- John Brown's short story "Rab and his Friends" is published.

== See also ==
- Timeline of Scottish history
- 1859 in Ireland
