= 1771 in Scotland =

- Centuries: 16th; 17th; 18th; 19th; 20th
- Decades: 1750s; 1760s; 1770s; 1780s; 1790s
- See also: List of years in Scotland; Timeline of Scottish history 1771 in: Great Britain • Wales • Elsewhere

Events from the year 1771 in Scotland.

== Incumbents ==
=== Law officers ===
- Lord Advocate – James Montgomery
- Solicitor General for Scotland – Henry Dundas

=== Judiciary ===
- Lord President of the Court of Session – Lord Arniston, the younger
- Lord Justice General – Duke of Queensberry
- Lord Justice Clerk – Lord Barskimming

== Events ==
- 17 August – Edinburgh botanist James Robertson makes the first recorded ascent of Ben Nevis.
- 16 November – During the night, Solway Moss, on the Cumberland border, bursts, flooding local farms and settlements.
- 26 November – First section of Monkland Canal opened.
- Encyclopædia Britannica First Edition completes publication in Edinburgh.
- Thomas Pennant's A Tour in Scotland, MDCCLXIX is published.
- Edinburgh Society of Bowlers codifies the modern rules for bowls.

== Births ==
- 15 August – Walter Scott, poet and novelist (died 1832)
- 11 September – Mungo Park, explorer (drowned under attack 1806 on the Niger)
- 4 November – James Montgomery, poet, hymnist, editor and humanitarian (died 1854 in Sheffield)

== Deaths ==
- 26 January – Sydney Parkinson, botanical illustrator (born c. 1745; died at sea)
- 14 May – Charles Bruce, 5th Earl of Elgin (born 1732)
- 17 September – Tobias Smollett, novelist (born 1721; died in Italy)
- William Lauder, literary forger (born c. 1680; died in Barbados)

== The arts ==
- Henry Mackenzie's novel The Man of Feeling and verse The Pursuits of Happiness published.

== See also ==
- Timeline of Scottish history
