= 1767 in Scotland =

- Centuries: 16th; 17th; 18th; 19th; 20th
- Decades: 1740s; 1750s; 1760s; 1770s; 1780s
- See also: List of years in Scotland; Timeline of Scottish history 1767 in: Great Britain • Wales • Elsewhere

Events from the year 1767 in Scotland.

== Incumbents ==
=== Law officers ===
- Lord Advocate – James Montgomery
- Solicitor General for Scotland – Henry Dundas

=== Judiciary ===
- Lord President of the Court of Session – Lord Arniston, the younger
- Lord Justice General – Duke of Queensberry
- Lord Justice Clerk – Lord Barskimming

== Events ==
- 1 January – The Banking Company in Aberdeen, a co-partnery, opens for business.
- July – Edinburgh Council adopts the final plan for the New Town, for which the architect James Craig has been made a Freeman of the city on 3 June.
- Quarries and lime kilns at Charlestown, Fife, opened by Charles Bruce, 5th Earl of Elgin.
- Marischal Bridge, the first of Aberdeen's viaducts, is completed.
- Auchincruive House is built after a design by Robert Adam.
- The circular Kilarrow Parish Church in Bowmore on Islay is built.
- The Johnston family enters the printing business.
- Adam Ferguson's An Essay on the History of Civil Society is published.

== Births ==
- 13 January – James Malcolm, Royal Marines officer (died 1849)
- 1 March – Alexander Balfour, novelist, short-story writer and poet (died 1829)
- 7 April – Henry Bell, marine engineer (died 1830)
- 6 July – George Johnstone Hope, admiral (died 1818 in London)
- 3 October – Alexander Hamilton, 10th Duke of Hamilton, politician and art collector (born, and died 1852, in London)
- Anthony Anderson, merchant and politician in Lower Canada (died 1847 in Canada)
- George Watson, portrait painter (died 1837)
- Approximate date – Miles Macdonell, settler in North America (died 1828)

== Deaths ==
- 1 April – Laurence Oliphant, Jacobite soldier (born 1691)
- 10 July – Alexander Monro, physician (born 1697 in London)
- 15 July – Michael Bruce, poet and hymnist (born 1746)
- 10 December – John Leslie, 10th Earl of Rothes, soldier (born 1698)
- William Delacour, portrait painter (born 1700 in France)

== See also ==
- Timeline of Scottish history
