= 1776 in Scotland =

- Centuries: 16th; 17th; 18th; 19th; 20th
- Decades: 1750s; 1760s; 1770s; 1780s; 1790s
- See also: List of years in Scotland; Timeline of Scottish history 1776 in: Great Britain • Wales • Elsewhere

Events from the year 1776 in Scotland.

== Incumbents ==
=== Law officers ===
- Lord Advocate – Henry Dundas;
- Solicitor General for Scotland – Alexander Murray

=== Judiciary ===
- Lord President of the Court of Session – Lord Arniston, the younger
- Lord Justice General – Duke of Queensberry
- Lord Justice Clerk – Lord Barskimming

== Events ==
- 27 February – American Revolution: At the Battle of Moore's Creek Bridge, Scottish American Loyalists are defeated by North Carolina Patriots. Capt. Allan MacDonald (husband of Flora) is among those taken prisoner.
- 4 July – American Revolution: United States Declaration of Independence. Fife-born James Wilson and Gifford-born Rev. John Witherspoon are among the signatories.
- Physician Andrew Duncan proposes establishment of the institution that becomes the Royal Public Dispensary of Edinburgh.
- New Aray Bridge on Inveraray Castle estate, designed by Robert Mylne, is completed.
- Probable – Dunmore Pineapple constructed.

== Publications ==
- 9 March – Adam Smith's The Wealth of Nations is published in London.
- David Dalrymple's Annals of Scotland are published.

== The arts ==
- David Herd's anthology Ancient and Modern Scottish Songs is published.

== Births ==
- 23 February – Heneage Horsley, Episcopal dean (died 1847)
- 9 March – Archibald Bell, lawyer and writer (died 1854)
- 11 April – Macvey Napier, lawyer and encyclopedia editor (died 1847)
- 15 April – John Anstruther, nobleman, landowner and colonel (died 1833)
- 11 June – James Gillespie Graham, architect (died 1855)
- 18 July – John Struthers, poet (died 1853)
- 6 October – James Duff, 4th Earl Fife, general in Spanish service (died 1857)
- 13 October – John Gibb, civil engineering contractor (died 1850)
- 7 November – James Abercromby, 1st Baron Dunfermline, lawyer and Whig politician (died 1858)
- 20 November – William Blackwood, publisher (died 1834)
- 30 November – James Jardine, hydraulic engineer (died 1858)

== Deaths ==
- 2 June – Robert Foulis, printer, publisher and art critic (born 1707)
- 25 August – David Hume, philosopher (born 1711)
