= 1855 in Scotland =

- Centuries: 17th; 18th; 19th; 20th; 21st
- Decades: 1830s; 1840s; 1850s; 1860s; 1870s
- See also: List of years in Scotland; Timeline of Scottish history 1855 in: The UK • Wales • Elsewhere

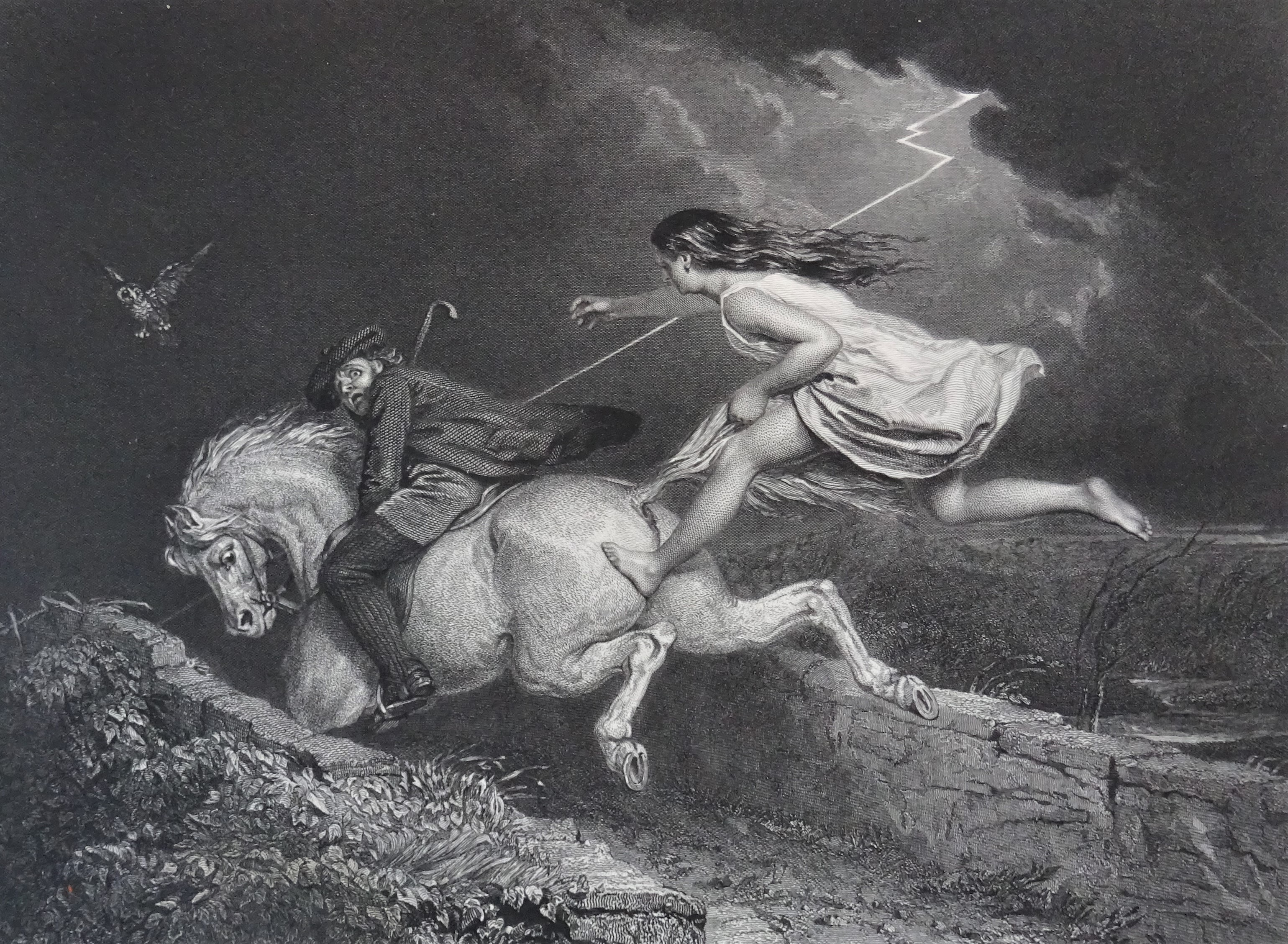

Events from the year 1855 in Scotland.

== Incumbents ==
=== Law officers ===
- Lord Advocate – James Moncreiff
- Solicitor General for Scotland – James Craufurd; then Thomas Mackenzie; then Edward Maitland

=== Judiciary ===
- Lord President of the Court of Session and Lord Justice General – Lord Colonsay
- Lord Justice Clerk – Lord Glencorse

== Events ==
- 1 January – civil registry of births, deaths and marriages in Scotland replaces parish church registers.
- c. February – establishment of the Industrial Museum of Scotland in Edinburgh, a predecessor of the National Museum of Scotland, with chemist George Wilson as its director. In August he is also appointed Regius Professor of Technology in the University of Edinburgh, the first such post in Britain. This year also he publishes Researches on Colour-Blindness.
- 16 February – emigrant ship Tornado sails from Broomielaw in Glasgow with 500 settlers bound for Melbourne.
- 25 July – Robert Napier and Sons launch RMS Persia on the River Clyde, the first iron-hulled ship for the Cunard Line and the world's largest at this date (3300 grt, 398 ft (121 m)).
- 5 November – Inverness and Nairn Railway opened, connecting Inverness to the railway network.
- 17 November – explorer David Livingstone discovers Victoria Falls in Africa.
- St Paul's Cathedral, Dundee, completed as an Episcopal church.
- Pier opened at Blairmore on Loch Long.
- The hydropathic establishment in Bridge of Allan is opened.
- Edinburgh Medical Journal first published.

== Births ==
- 27 March – James Alfred Ewing, physicist and engineer (died 1935)
- 25 May – Florence Dixie, born Lady Florence Douglas, war correspondent and feminist (died 1905)
- 14 October – William York Macgregor, landscape painter (died 1923)
- 25 October – Grace Cadell, pioneer physician, surgeon, novelist and militant suffragette (died 1918)
- 12 September – William Sharp, writer (died 1905 in Sicily)
- November 8 – James Williamson, photographer (died 1933)
- 18 November – Archibald Barr, mechanical engineer (died 1931)
- 23 December – Charles Alexander Stevenson, lighthouse engineer (died 1950)
- George Johnston, automobile engineer (died 1945)

== Deaths ==
- 20 February – Joseph Hume, doctor and Radical MP (born 1777)
- 11 March – James Gillespie Graham, architect (born 1776)
- 6 April – Robert Davidson, peasant poet (born 1778)
- 18 September – James Finlay Weir Johnston, agricultural chemist (born 1796)

== See also ==
- Timeline of Scottish history
- 1855 in Ireland
