= 1853 in Scotland =

- Centuries: 17th; 18th; 19th; 20th; 21st
- Decades: 1830s; 1840s; 1850s; 1860s; 1870s
- See also: List of years in Scotland; Timeline of Scottish history 1853 in: The UK • Wales • Elsewhere

Events from the year 1853 in Scotland.

== Incumbents ==
=== Law officers ===
- Lord Advocate – James Moncreiff
- Solicitor General for Scotland – Charles Neaves; then Robert Handyside; then James Craufurd

=== Judiciary ===
- Lord President of the Court of Session and Lord Justice General – Lord Colonsay
- Lord Justice Clerk – Lord Glencorse

== Events ==
- 12 August – Licensing (Scotland) Act (known after its sponsor as the 'Forbes Mackenzie Act') regulates the supply of intoxicating beverages.
- 28 September – emigrant ship Annie Jane sinks in heavy seas off Vatersay, with the loss of 350 lives.
- Highland Clearances in Skye and Raasay.
- National Association for the Vindication of Scottish Rights formed.
- Second cholera pandemic again revives in Scotland.
- Time ball installed on Nelson Monument, Edinburgh.
- Corn exchange built in Dalkeith.
- John Hill Burton publishes his History of Scotland from the Revolution to the Extinction of the last Jacobite Insurrection.
- Grand Orange Lodge of Scotland is formally established.

== Births ==
- 12 January – James MacLaren, architect in the "Arts and Crafts" style (died 1890)
- 4 March – Hector MacDonald, soldier (suicide 1903 in Paris)
- 31 March – Isaac Bayley Balfour, botanist (died 1922)
- 10 June – Alexander Watson Hutton, "father of football in Argentina" (died 1936 in Buenos Aires)
- 17 July – William Gunion Rutherford, classical scholar (died 1907 in England)

== Deaths ==
- 2 January – William Collins, publisher (born 1789)
- 30 July – John Struthers, poet (born 1776)
- 28 September – Adam Anderson, Lord Anderson, judge (born c.1797)
- 21 October – Robert Gordon, minister of religion and scientist (born 1786)

== The arts ==
- Summer – John Everett Millais stays at Brig o' Turk in Glen Finglas with John Ruskin and his wife Effie to begin painting John Ruskin.
- Alexander Smith's 'A Life Drama' is published as Poems.

== See also ==
- Timeline of Scottish history
- 1853 in Ireland
