= 1769 in Scotland =

- Centuries: 16th; 17th; 18th; 19th; 20th
- Decades: 1740s; 1750s; 1760s; 1770s; 1780s
- See also: List of years in Scotland; Timeline of Scottish history 1769 in: Great Britain • Wales • Elsewhere

Events from the year 1769 in Scotland.

== Incumbents ==
=== Law officers ===
- Lord Advocate – James Montgomery
- Solicitor General for Scotland – Henry Dundas

=== Judiciary ===
- Lord President of the Court of Session – Lord Arniston, the younger
- Lord Justice General – Duke of Queensberry
- Lord Justice Clerk – Lord Barskimming

== Events ==
- 29 April – James Watt is granted a British patent for "A method of lessening the consumption of steam in steam engines" – the separate condenser, a key improvement (first devised by Watt in 1765 in Glasgow) which stimulates the Industrial Revolution. In September he completes a full-size experimental engine at Kinneil House.
- July 17 – Welsh naturalist Thomas Pennant, having left Chester on 26 June, travels from Bamburgh to Dunbar to begin his tour of Scotland.
- 3 August – part of the first North Bridge, Edinburgh, collapses while nearing completion, killing five.
- 25 October – Murder of Alexander Montgomerie at Ardrossan.
- 9 November – first Co-operative Society in Britain founded by weavers at Fenwick, East Ayrshire.
- John Maxwell (of Dargavel) begins to practice as a lawyer in Glasgow, origin of McGrigors which continues as an independent firm until 2012.
- Ayr Bank opens.
- Fort George completed.

== Births ==
- 2 May – John Malcolm, soldier, statesman and historian (died 1833 in London)
- 14 April – Sir William Rae, 3rd Baronet, politician and lawyer (died 1842)
- Charles Ewart, soldier (died 1846 in England)
- Robert Hetrick, poet and blacksmith (died 1849)

== Deaths ==
- 25 October – Alexander Montgomerie, 10th Earl of Eglinton (born 1723; murdered)

== The arts ==
- 9 December – first Theatre Royal, Edinburgh, opens.
- Richard Hurd's Ancient and Modern Scots Songs published.
