= 1765 in Scotland =

- Centuries: 16th; 17th; 18th; 19th; 20th
- Decades: 1740s; 1750s; 1760s; 1770s; 1780s
- See also: List of years in Scotland; Timeline of Scottish history 1765 in: Great Britain • Wales • Elsewhere

Events from the year 1765 in Scotland.

== Incumbents ==
=== Law officers ===
- Lord Advocate – Thomas Miller of Glenlee
- Solicitor General for Scotland – James Montgomery

=== Judiciary ===
- Lord President of the Court of Session – Lord Arniston, the younger
- Lord Justice General – Duke of Queensberry
- Lord Justice Clerk – Lord Minto

== Events ==
- May – James Watt makes a breakthrough in the development of the steam engine by constructing a model with a separate condenser, an idea which has come to him in a walk on Glasgow Green.
- Sugar refinery at Greenock opened.
- Settlement at Grantown-on-Spey planned.

== Births ==
- 11 January – John A. Macdonald, first Canadian Prime Minister (died 1891 in Ottawa)
- 22 April – James Grahame, poet, lawyer and clergyman (died 1811)
- 20 July – Peter Nicholson, architect, engineer and mathematician (died 1844 in Carlisle)
- 24 August – Thomas Muir of Huntershill, radical (died 1799 in France)
- 24 October – James Mackintosh, polymath (died 1832 in London)

== Deaths ==
- 3 April – Jean Adam, poet and songwriter (born 1704)
- 30 November – George Glas, merchant adventurer (born 1725; murdered at sea)

== The arts ==
- First publication of the ballad "Sir Patrick Spens".
- Walter Scott's novel Redgauntlet (1824) presents an alternate history of this year.
