= 1854 in Scotland =

- Centuries: 17th; 18th; 19th; 20th; 21st
- Decades: 1830s; 1840s; 1850s; 1860s; 1870s
- See also: List of years in Scotland; Timeline of Scottish history 1854 in: The UK • Wales • Elsewhere

Events from the year 1854 in Scotland.

== Incumbents ==
=== Law officers ===
- Lord Advocate – James Moncreiff
- Solicitor General for Scotland – James Craufurd

=== Judiciary ===
- Lord President of the Court of Session and Lord Justice General – Lord Colonsay
- Lord Justice Clerk – Lord Glencorse

== Events ==
- 1 January – Victoria Bridge, Glasgow, opened over the River Clyde at Stockwell Street, replacing the Bishop's Bridge.
- July – first voyage by a seagoing steamship fitted with a compound steam engine, the screw steamer Brandon, built on the River Clyde by John Elder.
- 10 August – Merchant Shipping Act 1854 vests management of Scottish lighthouses in the Northern Lighthouse Board (among other provisions).
- 15 September – new North Ronaldsay lighthouse, designed by Alan Stevenson, first illuminated.
- 20 September – Aberdeen Kittybrewster railway station opened to serve the Great North of Scotland Railway main line to Keith.
- 11 October – temporary North Unst Lighthouse on Muckle Flugga (Shetland), designed by brothers Thomas and David Stevenson, first illuminated.
- 24 October – The Thin Red Line: a military action by the Sutherland Highlanders red-coated 93rd (Highland) Regiment at the Battle of Balaclava during the Crimean War. Pipe Major John MacLeod has during this campaign transcribed the tune "The Green Hills of Tyrol" for the bagpipes.
- November – The Orcadian newspaper begins publication in Kirkwall.
- Brown and Polson's patent corn flour first produced, in Paisley.

== Births ==
- 27 January – George Alexander Gibson, physician and geologist (died 1913)
- 16 February – Horatio Brown, Nice-born historian of Venice (died 1926 in Italy)
- 25 March – Alexander Reid, art dealer (died 1928)
- 31 March – Dugald Clerk, mechanical engineer, inventor of the two-stroke engine (died 1932 in England)
- 17 May – Donald MacAlister, physician and academic (died 1934 in England)
- 8 June – Eustace Balfour, architect (died 1911)
- 21 July – David Alan Stevenson, lighthouse designer (died 1938)
- 21 August – James Paterson, painter (died 1932)
- 17 September – David Dunbar Buick, automobile engineer (died 1929 in the United States)
- 2 October – Patrick Geddes, town planner (died 1932 in France)
- 22 October – Robert Urie, steam locomotive engineer (died 1937)
- 27 October – William Alexander Smith, businessman and founder of the Boys' Brigade (died 1914 in England)
- Cynicus (Martin Anderson), satirical cartoonist and postcard publisher (died 1932)
- William Lithgow, shipbuilder (died 1908)
- Neil Kennedy, Lord Kennedy, Chairman of the Scottish Land Court 1912-18 (died 1918)

== Deaths ==
- 17 February – William Mitchell, coalowner (born 1781)
- 3 April – John Wilson, writer (born 1785)
- 19 September – Peter Buchan, printer and collector of folk literature (born 1790)
- 6 October – Archibald Bell, lawyer and writer (born 1776)
- 25 November – John Gibson Lockhart, writer and editor (born 1794)

== See also ==
- Timeline of Scottish history
- 1854 in Ireland
