= 1772 in Scotland =

- Centuries: 16th; 17th; 18th; 19th; 20th
- Decades: 1750s; 1760s; 1770s; 1780s; 1790s
- See also: List of years in Scotland; Timeline of Scottish history 1772 in: Great Britain • Wales • Elsewhere

Events from the year 1772 in Scotland.

== Incumbents ==
=== Law officers ===
- Lord Advocate – James Montgomery
- Solicitor General for Scotland – Henry Dundas

=== Judiciary ===
- Lord President of the Court of Session – Lord Arniston, the younger
- Lord Justice General – Duke of Queensberry
- Lord Justice Clerk – Lord Barskimming

== Events ==
- April–June – the brig Alexander collects emigrants from the west of Scotland (the "Glenaladale settlers") and carries them to Prince Edward Island.
- 10 June – Credit crisis of 1772 is triggered when, following the flight of their partner, Aberdeen-born Alexander Fordyce, to France, the London banking house of Neal, James, Fordyce and Down (which has been speculating in East India Company stock) suspends payment. The resultant panic causes failure of other banks, particularly in Scotland, and especially in Edinburgh and the Ayr Bank.
- Summer – Welsh naturalist Thomas Pennant makes a second tour of Scotland.
- Construction of St Andrew Square, Edinburgh, as the first part of the New Town (designed by James Craig), begins.
- Original North Bridge, Edinburgh, completed.
- Three Stirling councillors privately sign a secret agreement, the "Black Bond", to run the affairs of the burgh to their own personal advantage.
- Fingal's Cave is brought to the attention of the English-speaking world by English naturalist Sir Joseph Banks.

== Births ==
- 15 January – James Ballantyne, editor and publisher (died 1833)
- 11 February – Thomas Webster, geologist (died 1844 in London)
- 8 June – Robert Stevenson, lighthouse engineer (died 1850)
- 25 December – John Mackay, botanist (died 1802)

== Deaths ==
- 26 July – James Graeme, poet (tuberculosis; born 1749)
- 10 October – William Wilkie, poet (ague; born 1721)

== The arts ==
- Lady Anne Lindsay writes the ballad "Auld Robin Gray".

== See also ==
- Timeline of Scottish history
