= 1919 in Scotland =

- Centuries: 18th; 19th; 20th; 21st
- Decades: 1890s; 1900s; 1910s; 1920s; 1930s
- See also: List of years in Scotland; Timeline of Scottish history 1919 in: The UK • Wales • Elsewhere; Scottish football: 1918–19 • 1919–20

Events from the year 1919 in Scotland.

== Incumbents ==
- Secretary for Scotland and Keeper of the Great Seal – Robert Munro

=== Law officers ===
- Lord Advocate – James Avon Clyde
- Solicitor General for Scotland – Thomas Brash Morison

=== Judiciary ===
- Lord President of the Court of Session and Lord Justice General – Lord Strathclyde
- Lord Justice Clerk – Lord Dickson
- Chairman of the Scottish Land Court – Lord St Vigeans

== Events ==
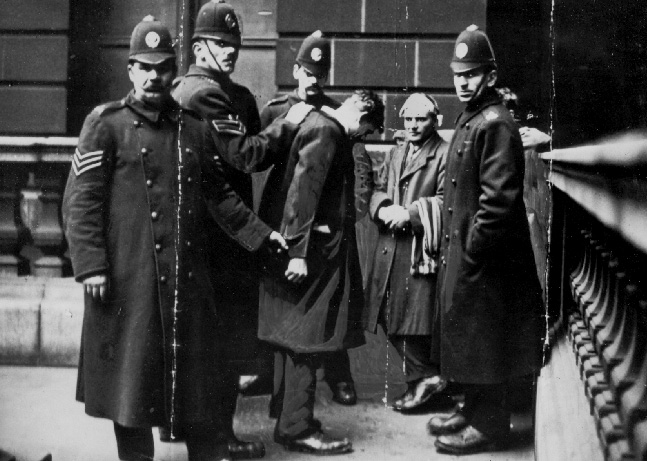
January: David Kirkwood is detained by police during the Battle of George Square in Glasgow.

- 1 January – HMY Iolaire is wrecked on rocks off Stornoway on the Isle of Lewis: 205 die, mostly servicemen returning home.
- 19 January – The Sunday Post first published under this title in Glasgow.
- 23 January – "Harbour Riot" in Glasgow: confrontation between White and Black merchant seamen.
- 27 January – general strike call in Glasgow and Belfast.
- 31 January – Battle of George Square ("Bloody Friday"): The police battle with protesters in Glasgow calling for a 40-hour working week; the civil authorities mobilise the Army (with tanks).
- 21 March – Queen of the South F.C. formed in Dumfries by merger.
- 28 April – Fraserburgh life-boat Lady Rothes, on service to HM Drifter Eminent, suffers two crew swept overboard.
- 12 May – Traprain Treasure of Roman silver found by archaeologists in Haddingtonshire.
- 21 June – scuttling of the German fleet at Scapa Flow: Admiral Ludwig von Reuter scuttles the interned German fleet in Scapa Flow. Nine German sailors are killed.

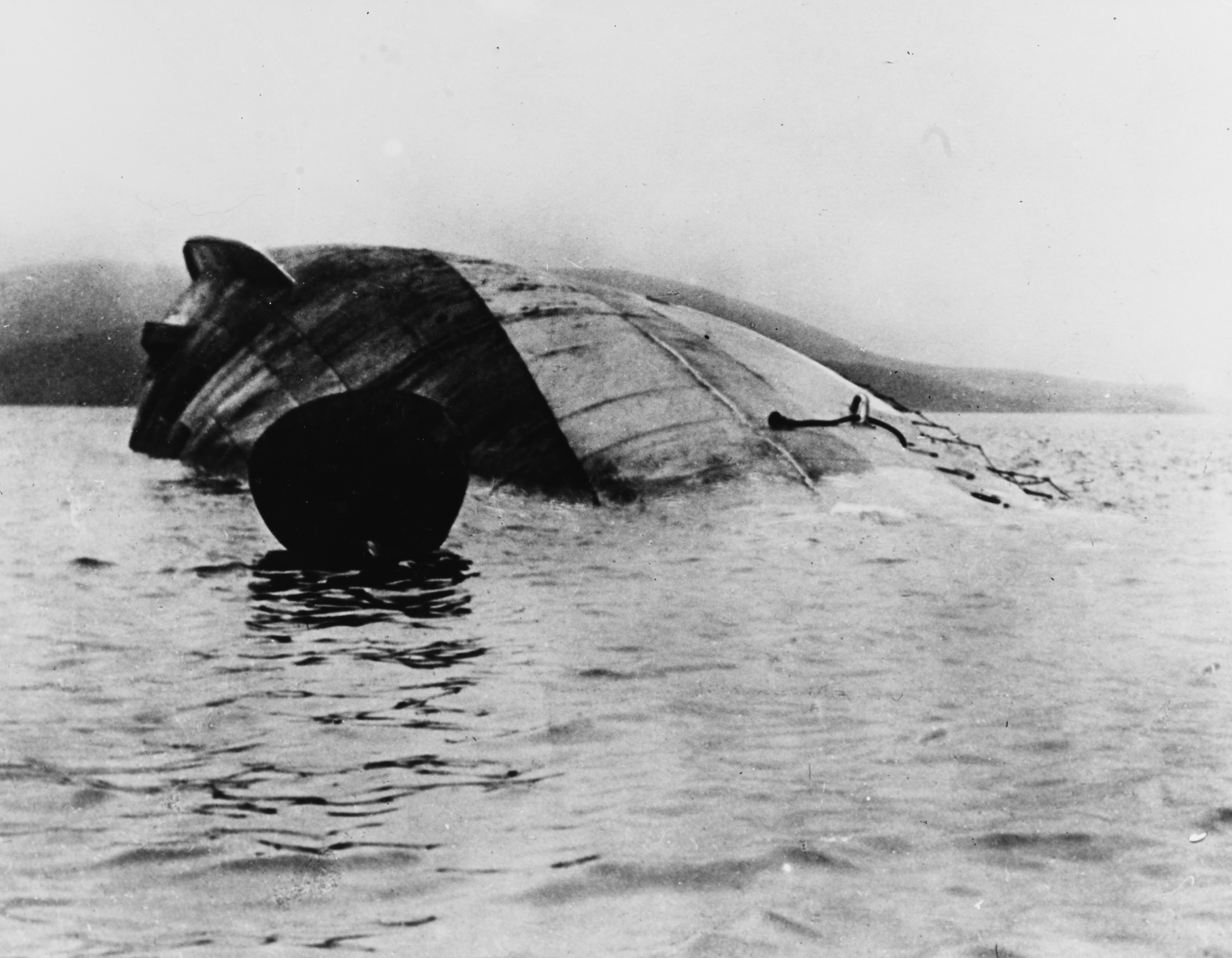
June: SMS Seydlitz capsized as a result of scuttling of the German fleet at Scapa Flow.

- 2 July – the British airship R34 (built by William Beardmore and Company at Inchinnan, Renfrewshire, 1918–19) takes off from RAF East Fortune to make the first transatlantic flight by dirigible, and the first westbound flight, to Mineola, New York.
- July – First known female graduate in engineering from a Scottish university, Elizabeth Georgeson at the University of Edinburgh.
- 25 December – opening of Cliftonhill stadium in Coatbridge, the home of Albion Rovers F.C. The opening match sees them lose 2–0 to St Mirren.
- English industrialist William Lever, Baron Leverhulme, buys an estate on the Isle of Harris.
- Lt.-Col. John MacRae-Gilstrap plans complete reconstruction of the ruined Eilean Donan castle.

== Births ==
- 15 January – John Junor, newspaper editor (died 1997)
- 21 January – Eric "Winkle" Brown, test pilot (died 2016 in England)
- 21 April – James Quinn, Jesuit priest, theologian and hymnodist (died 2010)
- 9 April – Iain Moncreiffe, officer of arms (died 1985)
- 12 May – Peter Cochrane, soldier and publisher (died 2015)
- 18 May – Hugh Brown, Labour politician (died 2008)
- 21 May – Robert Henderson Blyth, landscape painter and artist (died 1970)
- 30 May – Eric Lomax, British Army officer and prisoner of war (died 2012 in England)
- 10 July – George Mackie, Liberal politician (died 2015)
- 8 August – Willie Woodburn, international footballer (died 2001)
- 8 September – Alistair Urquhart, soldier, businessman and author (died 2016)
- 3 November – Ludovic Kennedy, journalist (died 2009)
- 6 November – Chic Murray, comedian (died 1985)
- 11 November – Hamish Henderson, folk song collector (died 2002)

== Deaths ==
- 6 May – William Grant Stevenson, sculptor and portrait painter (born 1849)
- 11 August – Andrew Carnegie, industrialist and philanthropist (born 1835)
- 16 August – James Burns, 3rd Baron Inverclyde, shipowner (born 1864)
- 16 October – Sir Hugh Munro, 4th Baronet, mountaineer known for his list of mountains in Scotland over 3,000 feet (born 1856)
- 14 November – John Aitken, meteorologist (born 1839)
- 10 December – John MacDougall Hay, Church of Scotland minister and novelist, of TB (born 1879)

== See also ==
- Timeline of Scottish history
- 1919 in Ireland
