= 1926 in Scotland =

- Centuries: 18th; 19th; 20th; 21st
- Decades: 1900s; 1910s; 1920s; 1930s; 1940s
- See also: List of years in Scotland; Timeline of Scottish history 1926 in: The UK • Wales • Elsewhere; Scottish football: 1925–26 • 1926–27

Events from the year 1926 in Scotland.

== Incumbents ==
- Secretary for Scotland and Keeper of the Great Seal – Sir John Gilmour, Bt until post abolished 26 July
- Secretary of State for Scotland and Keeper of the Great Seal, from 15 July – Sir John Gilmour, Bt

=== Law officers ===
- Lord Advocate – William Watson
- Solicitor General for Scotland – Alexander Munro MacRobert

=== Judiciary ===
- Lord President of the Court of Session and Lord Justice General – Lord Clyde
- Lord Justice Clerk – Lord Alness
- Chairman of the Scottish Land Court – Lord St Vigeans

== Events ==
- 29 January – Dunbartonshire and East Renfrewshire by-elections: Conservatives retain the seats.
- 26 March – Bothwell by-election: Labour retains the seat.
- 3 – 12 May: 1926 United Kingdom general strike. Some violence in Glasgow.
- 26 November – launch, under the auspices of the Scots National League, of a new monthly Nationalist newspaper entitled The Scots Independent.
- Findhorn Bridge near Tomatin completed.
- First stage of Lanark Hydro Electric Scheme constructed.
- Scotland's only sugar beet processing plant is opened at Cupar.
- Sacramento River sternwheel paddle steamers Delta King and Delta Queen are shipped from William Denny and Brothers' yard at Dumbarton to California.
- The post of Secretary for Scotland upgraded to a full Secretary of State appointment

== Births ==
- 13 January – Craigie Aitchison, painter (died 2009)
- 17 January – Moira Shearer, ballet dancer (died 2006 in England)
- 11 February – Alexander Gibson, conductor and opera intendant (died 1995)
- 19 February – Charlie Cox, footballer (died 2008)
- 8 March – Edith MacArthur, actress (died 2018)
- 12 March – Gudrun Ure, actress (died 2024)
- 22 March – Alastair Reid, poet and scholar of South American literature (died 2014 in the United States)
- 1 April – William Macpherson, High Court judge and clan chief (died 2021)
- 3 April – Andrew Keir, actor (died 1997 in England)
- 22 April – James Stirling, architect (died 1992 in England)
- 24 May – Stanley Baxter, comic actor (died 2025 in England)
- 31 May – Duncan Campbell, trumpet player (died 2013 in England)
- 2 July – Morag Beaton, dramatic soprano (died 2010 in Australia)
- 3 August – Rona Anderson, actress (died 2013 in England)
- 15 August – D. E. R. Watt, historian (died 2004)
- 4 September – George William Gray, chemist, pioneer of liquid crystal technology (died 2013)
- 12 September – Dave Valentine, international rugby player (died 1976)
- 17 October – Archie Duncan, historian (died 2017)
- 9 November – Johnny Beattie, comedian (died 2020)

== Deaths ==
- 2 January – John Gray McKendrick, physiologist, Regius Professor of Physiology at the University of Glasgow (born 1841)
- 3 February – Archibald White Maconochie, businessman and MP (born 1855)
- 4 April – John McTavish footballer (born 1885)
- 31 July – John McPherson, international footballer (born 1868)
- 4 September – Alexander Morison McAldowie, physician, folklorist and ornithologist (born 1852)

== The arts ==
- 11 October – Public premiere of Till the Bells Ring, possibly the world's first feature-length sound film (using Lee de Forest's Phonofilm system, employing sound-on-film technology) at C. W. Poole's Synod Hall in Edinburgh. It is an historical domestic comedy written by and starring Graham Moffat with dialogue in Scots.
- 22 November – Hugh MacDiarmid's Scots language poem A Drunk Man Looks at the Thistle is published.

== See also ==
- Timeline of Scottish history
- 1926 in Northern Ireland
