= 1920 in Scotland =

- Centuries: 18th; 19th; 20th; 21st
- Decades: 1900s; 1910s; 1920s; 1930s; 1940s
- See also: List of years in Scotland; Timeline of Scottish history 1920 in: The UK • Wales • Elsewhere; Scottish football: 1919–20 • 1920–21

Events from the year 1920 in Scotland.

== Incumbents ==
- Secretary for Scotland and Keeper of the Great Seal – Robert Munro

=== Law officers ===
- Lord Advocate – James Avon Clyde until 31 March; then Thomas Brash Morison
- Solicitor General for Scotland – Thomas Brash Morison until 31 March; then Charles David Murray

=== Judiciary ===
- Lord President of the Court of Session and Lord Justice General – Lord Strathclyde until 1 April; then Lord Clyde
- Lord Justice Clerk – Lord Dickson
- Chairman of the Scottish Land Court – Lord St Vigeans

== Events ==
- 12 February – Paisley by-election: Former UK Prime Minister H. H. Asquith, who lost his East Fife seat at the general election two years previously, retains the seat for Liberals, with an increased majority of 2,834 votes over the Labour Party candidate, John McLaren Biggar.
- 31 March –
  - Thomas Brash Morison is appointed Lord Advocate, replacing James Avon Clyde.
  - Charles David Murray is appointed Solicitor General for Scotland, replacing Thomas Brash Morison.
- 8 June – John Wilson is installed as Senator of the College of Justice with the judicial title Lord Ashmore, replacing the deceased Lord Charles Guthrie.
- 17 August – transatlantic liner RMS Empress of Canada is launched at the Fairfield Shipbuilding and Engineering Company's yard at Govan on the Clyde for Canadian Pacific Steamships.
- 20 November – Edinburgh absorbs the burgh of Leith.
- 5 December – Scotland votes against prohibition generally, despite 40 districts voting in favour.
- December – Madge Easton Anderson becomes the first woman admitted to practice as a professional lawyer in the UK when she qualifies as a solicitor (law agent) in Scotland.
- First council houses in Scotland, and the first housing estate in Europe to have a district heating system, the Logie Estate in Dundee.
- Edith Hughes establishes her own architectural practice, in Glasgow, the first British woman to do so.
- The fishing village of Obbe on the Isle of Harris is renamed Leverburgh after the English landowner William Lever, Baron Leverhulme.
- Scottish Protestant League founded by Alexander Ratcliffe.
- Border Terrier first recognised as a dog breed by The Kennel Club.

== Births ==
- 3 January – Hugh McCartney, Labour MP (died 2006)
- 4 March – Alan MacNaughtan, Scottish actor (died 2002)
- 27 April – Edwin Morgan, poet (died 2010)
- 2 May – Joe "Mr Piano" Henderson, pianist and composer (died 1980)
- 22 September – Lyall Stuart Scott, consultant surgeon (died 1977)
- 17 October – Donald Stewart, SNP MP for the Western Isles 1970–87 (died 1992)
- 22 November – Anne Crawford, film actress, born in Mandatory Palestine (died 1956 in England)
- 28 November – Alexander Scott, poet and literary scholar (died 1989)
- 13 December – John Rennie (GC), acting sergeant with the Argyll and Sutherland Highlanders of Canada (Princess Louise's), awarded the George Cross (died 1943 in England)

== Deaths ==
- 18 January – John McClure, admiral in the Imperial Chinese Navy (born 1837)
- 14 April – John George Bartholomew, cartographer (born 1860)
- 17 April – Alex Higgins, international footballer (born 1863)
- 10 August – Erskine Beveridge, textile manufacturer and antiquarian (born 1851)
- 12 October – Thomas Lennox Watson, architect, (born 1850)
- Robert Munro, archeologist, (born 1835)

== The arts ==
- Catherine Carswell publishes her first novel, Open the Door!, set in Glasgow.
- Will Fyffe writes and records the song "I Belong to Glasgow."
- Pavilion Cinema in Galashiels opens as The Playhouse.

== See also ==
- Timeline of Scottish history
- 1921 in Ireland
