= 1900 in Scotland =

- Centuries: 17th; 18th; 19th; 20th; 21st
- Decades: 1880s; 1890s; 1900s; 1910s; 1920s
- See also: List of years in Scotland; Timeline of Scottish history 1900 in: The UK • Wales • Elsewhere; Scottish football: 1899–1900 • 1900–01

Events from the year 1900 in Scotland.

== Incumbents ==
- Secretary for Scotland and Keeper of the Great Seal – Lord Balfour of Burleigh

=== Law officers ===
- Lord Advocate – Andrew Murray
- Solicitor General for Scotland – Charles Dickson

=== Judiciary ===
- Lord President of the Court of Session and Lord Justice General – Lord Blair Balfour
- Lord Justice Clerk – Lord Kingsburgh

== Events ==
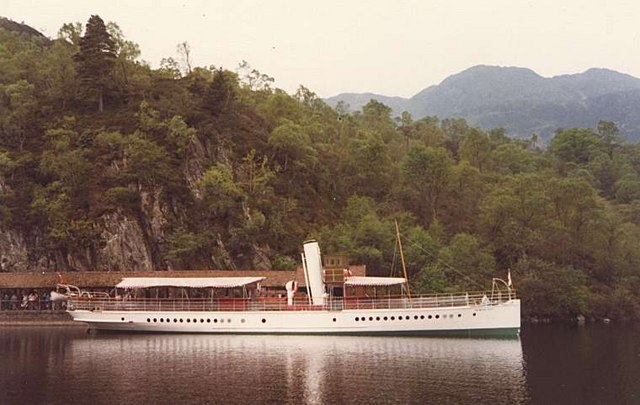
SS Sir Walter Scott at Trossachs Pier on Loch Katrine

- 23 March – SS Sir Walter Scott enters excursion service on Loch Katrine.
- 23 April–12 May – the Automobile Club of Great Britain stages a Thousand Mile Trial, a reliability motor rally over a circular route from London to Edinburgh and return.
- May – the Migdale Hoard of early Bronze Age jewellery is discovered near Bonar Bridge.
- September–November – Queen Victoria pays her last visit to Balmoral Castle.
- 31 October – the United Free Church of Scotland is formed by union of the United Presbyterian Church of Scotland and the Free Church of Scotland.
- 15 December – all three keepers of the Flannan Isles Lighthouse are drowned.
- 21 December – Delting disaster: four fishing boats with 22 crew from the Shetland villages of Mossbank and Firth (in the parish of Delting) are lost in a storm.
- Charles Rennie Mackintosh designs the White Dining Room for Catherine Cranston's tearooms in Ingram Street, Glasgow.
- Margaret Barr Fulton begins work as the UK's first qualified occupational therapist at Aberdeen Royal Lunatic Asylum.
- Nordrach on Dee Hospital at Banchory opens, the first specialist sanatorium in Scotland for tuberculosis patients.

== Births ==
- 6 February – Guy Warrack, conductor (died 1986)
- 14 March – Margaret Kidd, lawyer (died 1989)
- 29 March – Margaret Sinclair, nun (died 1925)
- 29 May – David Maxwell Fyfe, 1st Earl of Kilmuir, lawyer and politician, Lord Chancellor (died 1967)
- 17 June – Evelyn Irons, journalist, war correspondent (died 2000)
- 30 June – James Stagg, meteorologist (died 1975)
- 13 July – Bessie Watson, child suffragette and piper (died 1992)
- 25 August – Isobel Hogg Kerr Beattie, architect (died 1970)
- 9 October – Alastair Sim, character actor on stage and screen (died 1976)
- 12 December – David Meiklejohn, international footballer (died 1959)

== Deaths ==
- 15 May – Hercules Linton, shipbuilder (born 1837)
- 30 May – Francis Moncreiff, international rugby union player and Scotland's first captain (born 1849)
- 9 October – John Crichton-Stuart, 3rd Marquess of Bute, landowner (born 1847)

== The arts ==
- 10 April – Soprano Mary Garden makes her operatic debut in the title role of Gustave Charpentier's opera Louise at the Opéra-Comique in Paris.
- Doric dialect poet Charles Murray publishes Hamewith, including "The Whistle".

== See also ==
- Timeline of Scottish history
- 1900 in Ireland
