= 1856 in Scotland =

- Centuries: 17th; 18th; 19th; 20th; 21st
- Decades: 1830s; 1840s; 1850s; 1860s; 1870s
- See also: List of years in Scotland; Timeline of Scottish history 1856 in: The UK • Wales • Elsewhere

Events from the year 1856 in Scotland.

== Incumbents ==
=== Law officers ===
- Lord Advocate – James Moncreiff
- Solicitor General for Scotland – Edward Maitland

=== Judiciary ===
- Lord President of the Court of Session and Lord Justice General – Lord Colonsay
- Lord Justice Clerk – Lord Glencorse

== Events ==
- 4 January – Faculty of Actuaries established.
- February – an oak and a yew tree associated with William Wallace at his reputed birthplace of Elderslie are blown down in a storm.
- 1 April – Aberdeen Waterloo railway station opens to serve the Great North of Scotland Railway main line to Keith.
- November – James Clerk Maxwell takes up an appointment as Professor of Natural Philosophy at Marischal College, Aberdeen.
- 31 December – Lord Brougham's Act requires at least one party to a marriage contracted after this date to have been resident in Scotland for 21 days, putting a curb on Gretna Green marriage.

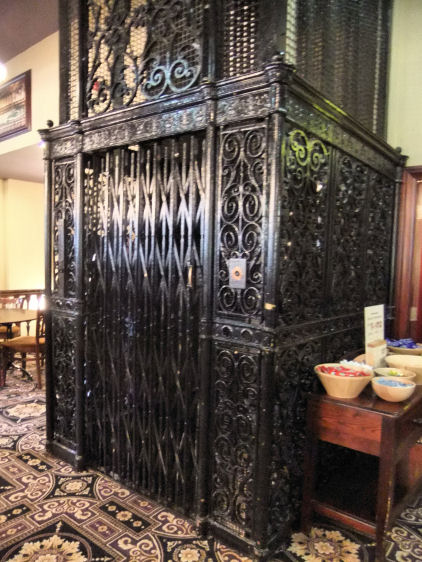
Otis elevator in Glasgow, imported from the U.S. in 1856 for Gardner's Warehouse, the oldest cast-iron fronted building in the British Isles

- Trinity College, Glasgow, established as a Church College of the Free Church of Scotland.
- Dunfermline claims city status in the United Kingdom by historical usage; the status is never officially recognised.
- William McEwan opens McEwan's Fountain Brewery at Fountainbridge in Edinburgh.
- The iron steamboat Thomas is built for service on the Forth and Clyde Canal, origin of the Clyde puffer.
- The Clyde Model Yacht Club, a predecessor of the Royal Northern and Clyde Yacht Club, is established.

== Births ==
- 30 May – James Pittendrigh Macgillivray, sculptor and poet (died 1938)
- 5 July – Ion Keith-Falconer, road racing cyclist, Arabic scholar and missionary (died 1887 in Aden)
- 15 August – Keir Hardie, socialist and labour leader (died 1915)
- 13 September – Henry Halcro Johnston, botanist, army physician and rugby union international (died 1939)
- 27 November – Matthew Stirling, locomotive engineer (died 1931 in Hull)
- 1 December – Malcolm Smith, Liberal politician (died 1935)
- William W. Naismith, mountaineer (died 1935)
- William Robertson, industrialist (died 1923)

== Deaths ==
- August – James Bremner, shipbuilder and salvor (born 1784)
- 30 August – John Ross, naval officer and Arctic explorer (born 1777)
- 20 September – Samuel Morison Brown, chemist, poet and essayist (born 1817)
- 23/24 December – Hugh Miller, geologist, by suicide (born 1802)
- 25 February – George Don, botanist (born 1798)

== The arts ==
- McLellan Galleries opened in Glasgow.

== See also ==
- Timeline of Scottish history
- 1856 in Ireland
