= 1773 in Scotland =

- Centuries: 16th; 17th; 18th; 19th; 20th
- Decades: 1750s; 1760s; 1770s; 1780s; 1790s
- See also: List of years in Scotland; Timeline of Scottish history 1773 in: Great Britain • Wales • Elsewhere

Events from the year 1773 in Scotland.

== Incumbents ==
=== Law officers ===
- Lord Advocate – James Montgomery
- Solicitor General for Scotland – Henry Dundas

=== Judiciary ===
- Lord President of the Court of Session – Lord Arniston, the younger
- Lord Justice General – Duke of Queensberry
- Lord Justice Clerk – Lord Barskimming

== Events ==
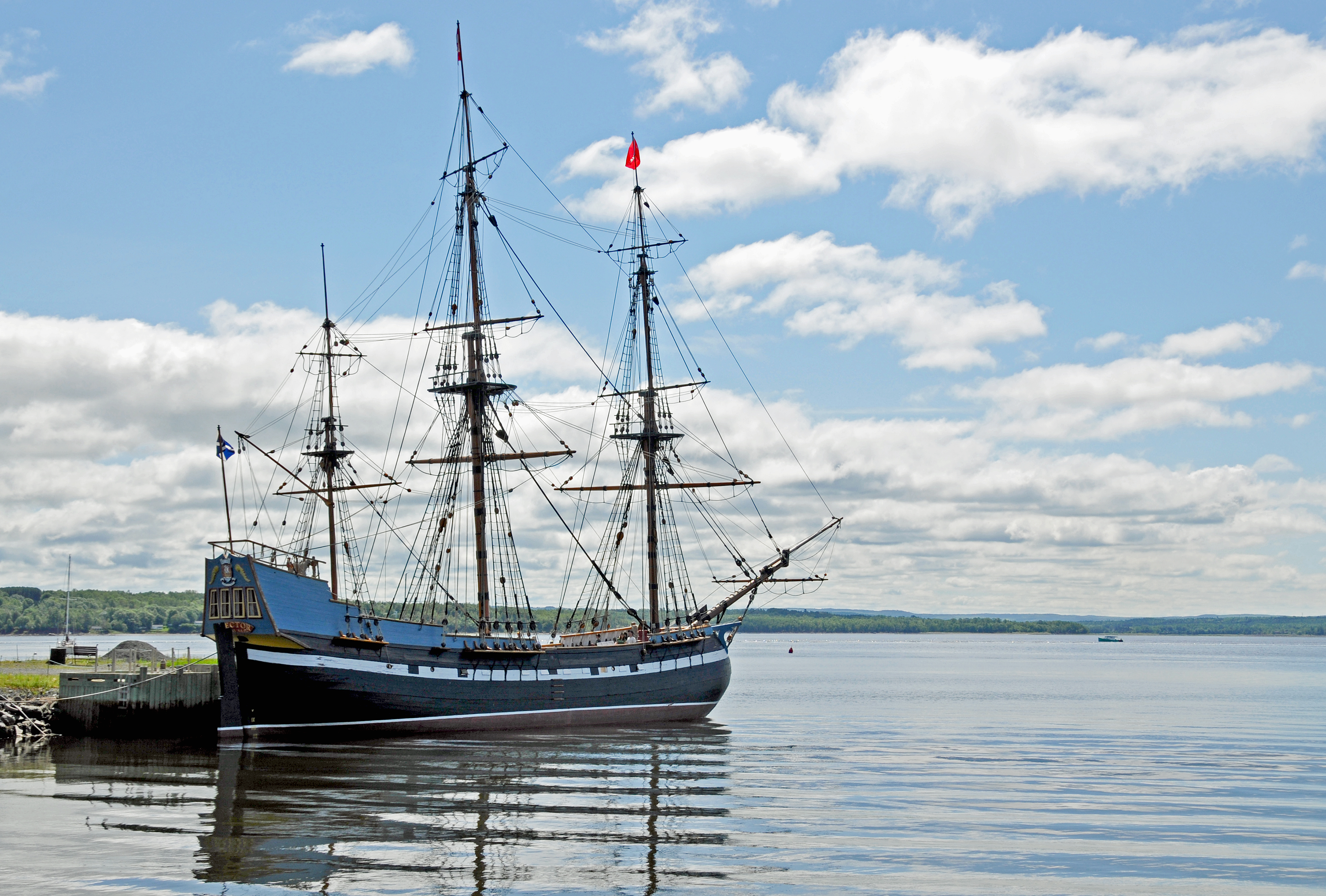
Hector (replica)

- Mid-July – the emigrant ship Hector sets out from Scotland carrying emigrants mainly escaping the Highland Clearances around Loch Broom for Pictou, Nova Scotia, where they arrive on 15 September.
- 6 August – Samuel Johnson sets out for Scotland where on 14 August he meets James Boswell in Edinburgh for their tour to the Hebrides. On 12 September they are entertained at Kingsburgh, Skye, by Allan and Flora MacDonald.
- Penny Post introduced in Edinburgh.
- Scottish judge James Burnett, Lord Monboddo, begins publication of Of the Origin and Progress of Language, a contribution to evolutionary ideas of the Enlightenment.
- David Dalrymple, Lord Hailes, publishes Remarks on the History of Scotland.

== Births ==
- 6 April – James Mill, historian, economist, political theorist and philosopher (died 1836 in London)
- 12 April – Thomas Thomson, chemist and mineralogist (died 1852)
- 23 July – Thomas Brisbane, astronomer and Governor of New South Wales (died 1860)
- 15 September – Alexander Ranaldson Macdonell of Glengarry, clan chief (died 1828)
- 23 October – Francis Jeffrey, Lord Jeffrey, judge and literary critic (died 1850)
- 21 December – Robert Brown, botanist and palaeobotanist (died 1858 in London)

== Deaths ==
- 9 February – John Gregory, physician, medical writer and moralist (born 1724)

== See also ==
- Timeline of Scottish history
