= 1921 in Scotland =

- Centuries: 18th; 19th; 20th; 21st
- Decades: 1900s; 1910s; 1920s; 1930s; 1940s
- See also: List of years in Scotland; Timeline of Scottish history 1921 in: The UK • Wales • Elsewhere; Scottish football: 1920–21 • 1921–22

Events from the year 1921 in Scotland.

== Incumbents ==
- Secretary for Scotland and Keeper of the Great Seal – Robert Munro

=== Law officers ===
- Lord Advocate – Thomas Brash Morison
- Solicitor General for Scotland – Charles David Murray

=== Judiciary ===
- Lord President of the Court of Session and Lord Justice General – Lord Clyde
- Lord Justice Clerk – Lord Dickson
- Chairman of the Scottish Land Court – Lord St Vigeans

== Events ==
- 24 March – the largest conventional civilian sailing ship ever built in the British Isles, the 5-masted barque-rigged commercial sail training vessel København (3,965 GRT), is launched by Ramage and Ferguson at Leith for the Danish East Asiatic Company.
- 1 April – airship R36 (G-FAAF) makes her maiden flight from William Beardmore and Company's works at Inchinnan, Renfrewshire.
- 4 May – the Irish Republican Army kill a former Royal Irish Constabulary inspector in Glasgow.
- 7 May – the Scottish Union of Dock Labourers calls a month-long strike in sympathy with coal miners.
- May – "Rona Raiders": a group of ex-servicemen from South Rona land on Raasay in an attempt to reoccupy their ancestral land. Although arrested and jailed they are ultimately successful in their campaign.
- 28 July – Church of Scotland Act 1921 given Royal Assent, recognising the Church's Articles Declaratory and thus its status as the national church in Scotland but independent from the state in spiritual matters.
- 7 September – Prime Minister David Lloyd George (on holiday in Gairloch) summons a meeting of the Cabinet of the United Kingdom at Inverness Town House to discuss an independent Ireland's relationship with the British Empire.
- 8 October – SS Rowan sinks off the Rhins of Galloway after a double collision with the loss of at least 18 lives.
- The Scottish county of Haddingtonshire is renamed East Lothian.
- Belted Galloway Association formed.

== Births ==
- 4 March – John Ryan, cartoonist (died 2009 in England)
- 31 March – (in London) Elizabeth Sutherland, 24th Countess of Sutherland, noblewoman (died 2019)
- 6 May – Elizabeth Sellars, actress (died 2019 in France)
- 5 August – Derick Thomson, Gaelic scholar and poet (died 2012)
- 13 August - Mary Lee, singer (died 2022)
- 1 September – Bobby Flavell, footballer (died 2005)
- 30 September – Deborah Kerr, actress (died 2007 in England)
- 11 October – Ann Henderson, sculptor (died 1976)
- 12 October – Logie Bruce Lockhart, journalist and rugby player (died 2020)
- 17 October – George Mackay Brown, poet (died 1996)

== Deaths ==
- 15 February - Mary Cameron, painter, (born 1865)
- 10 March – John More Dick Peddie, architect (born 1853)
- 1 June – Sir Robert Rowand Anderson, architect (born 1834)
- 29 September - John Thomson, pioneering photographer, geographer, and traveler (born 1837)
- 18 October – Peter Graham, artist (born 1836)
- 23 October – John Boyd Dunlop, inventor (born 1840)
- 28 October – William Speirs Bruce, naturalist and Antarctic explorer (born 1867 in London)
- 12 December – Frances MacDonald, artist and designer (born 1873 in Staffordshire)

== See also ==
- Timeline of Scottish history
- 1921 in Northern Ireland
