= 1857 in Scotland =

- Centuries: 17th; 18th; 19th; 20th; 21st
- Decades: 1830s; 1840s; 1850s; 1860s; 1870s
- See also: List of years in Scotland; Timeline of Scottish history 1857 in: The UK • Wales • Elsewhere

Events from the year 1857 in Scotland.

== Incumbents ==
=== Law officers ===
- Lord Advocate – James Moncreiff
- Solicitor General for Scotland – Edward Maitland

=== Judiciary ===
- Lord President of the Court of Session and Lord Justice General – Lord Colonsay
- Lord Justice Clerk – Lord Glencorse

== Events ==
- 18 March – the Greenock Telegraph begins publication.
- 1 May – Institution of Engineers and Shipbuilders in Scotland inaugurated in Glasgow.
- 30 June – 9 July: trial of Madeleine Smith, charged with the poisoning of a former lover in Glasgow; a "not proven" verdict is returned.
- 9 November – The Western Bank of Scotland (Glasgow) collapses.
- 16 November – the 93rd (Sutherland Highlanders) Regiment of Foot wins six Victoria Crosses in the storming of Sikandar Bagh during the second relief of Lucknow in the Indian Rebellion of 1857.
- Police (Scotland) Act 1857 makes the provision of a police force mandatory in the counties of Scotland.
- Lunga, Treshnish Isles, is depopulated.
- First whaler to be fitted with a steam engine, the Tay at Dundee.
- W. C. Stewart publishes The Practical Angler.

== Births ==
- 31 March – John James Burnet, architect (died 1938)
- 11 April – John Davidson, poet and playwright (drowned himself 1909 at Penzance)
- 15 May – Williamina Fleming, née Stevens, astronomer noted for her discovery of the Horsehead Nebula in 1888 (died 1911 in the United States)
- 15 June – William Fife, yacht designer (died 1944)
- 4 July – John Campbell, architect (died 1942 in New Zealand)
- 11 July – David Prain, botanist (died 1944)
- 19 September – James Bridie, international rugby union player (died 1893 in England)
- 2 October – John Macintyre, laryngologist and pioneer radiographer (died 1928)
- Date unknown – John Wilson, Lord Ashmore, Sheriff 1900–20, Senator of the College of Justice 1930–28 (died 1932)

== Deaths ==
- 9 March – James Duff, 4th Earl Fife, general in Spanish service and landowner (born 1776)
- 19 March – William Henry Playfair, architect (born 1790 in London)
- 15 April – William Skinner, bishop and Primus (born 1778)
- 26 August – Christian Isobel Johnstone, writer and editor (born 1781)
- 14 October – Alexander Laing, "the Brechin poet" (born 1787)
- 18 November – John Fleming, minister, naturalist, zoologist and geologist (born 1785)

== The arts ==
- Britannia Music Hall opened in Glasgow.

== See also ==
- Timeline of Scottish history
- 1857 in Ireland
