= 1860 in Scotland =

- Centuries: 17th; 18th; 19th; 20th; 21st
- Decades: 1840s; 1850s; 1860s; 1870s; 1880s
- See also: List of years in Scotland; Timeline of Scottish history 1860 in: The UK • Wales • Elsewhere

Events from the year 1860 in Scotland.

== Incumbents ==
=== Law officers ===
- Lord Advocate – James Moncreiff
- Solicitor General for Scotland – Edward Maitland

=== Judiciary ===
- Lord President of the Court of Session and Lord Justice General – Lord Colonsay
- Lord Justice Clerk – Lord Glenalmond

== Events ==
- 15 September – King's and Marischal Colleges in Aberdeen merge as the University of Aberdeen.
- October – the Royal National Lifeboat Institution stations the first Thurso life-boat at Scrabster.
- 17 October – the first professional golf tournament is held at Prestwick, regarded as the first Open (although it is not truly open until the following year when amateurs can participate).
- 21 December – St Mary's Cathedral, Aberdeen (Roman Catholic) is dedicated.
- Royal Hospital for Sick Children, Edinburgh, opens.
- Andrew Stewart sets up the Clyde Tube Works in Glasgow, a predecessor of Stewarts & Lloyds.
- Folklorist John Francis Campbell begins publication of Popular Tales of the West Highlands in Edinburgh.

== Births ==
- 6 March – Ronald Munro Ferguson, 1st Viscount Novar, politician, 6th Governor-General of Australia (died 1934)
- 7 March – John Duncan Watson, civil engineer (died 1946 in Birmingham)
- 22 March – John George Bartholomew, cartographer (died 1920)
- 15 April – Edward Arthur Walton, painter (died 1922)
- 2 May
  - John Scott Haldane, physiologist (died 1936)
  - D'Arcy Wentworth Thompson, biologist (died 1948)
- 9 May – J. M. Barrie, author (died 1937 in London)
- 30 May – Archibald Thorburn, wildlife painter (died 1935 in Surrey, England)
- 3 July – William Wallace, composer (died 1940)
- 31 July – George Warrender, admiral (died 1917 in London)
- 3 August – William Kennedy Dickson, inventor, pioneer of cinematography, born in France (died 1935 in Twickenham, England)
- 19 August – John Kane, naïve painter (died 1934 in the United States)
- 25 September – John Hope, 7th Earl of Hopetoun, 1st Governor-General of Australia (died 1908 in France)
- 21 November – James Leith Macbeth Bain, religious minister, hymn writer and walker (died 1925)
- 26 November – James Whitelaw Hamilton, landscape painter (died 1932)
- James Colton, anarchist (died 1936)
- James Miller, architect (died 1947)

== Deaths ==
- 27 January – Major-General Sir Thomas Brisbane, former Governor of New South Wales and astronomer (born 1773)
- 25 March – James Braid, surgeon and scientist, often regarded as the first genuine hypnotherapist (born 1795)
- 1 April – William Mure, scholar and politician (born 1799)
- 25 August – William Wilson, poet and publisher (born 1801)
- James Barr, composer (born 1779)

== See also ==
- Timeline of Scottish history
- 1860 in Ireland
