= 1850 in Scotland =

- Centuries: 17th; 18th; 19th; 20th; 21st
- Decades: 1830s; 1840s; 1850s; 1860s; 1870s
- See also: List of years in Scotland; Timeline of Scottish history 1850 in: The UK • Wales • Elsewhere

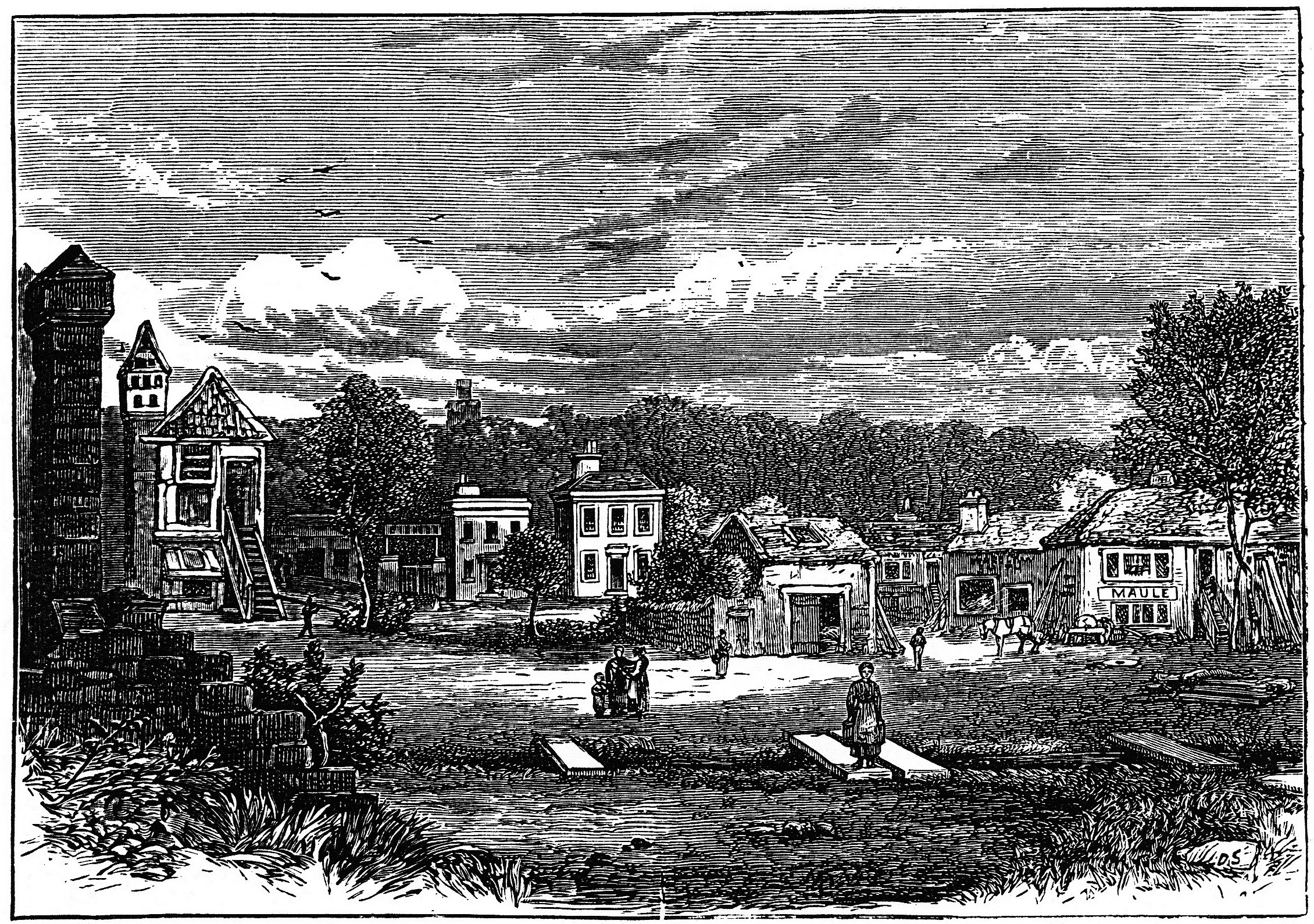
Broughton Burn, 1850

Events from the year 1850 in Scotland.

== Incumbents ==
=== Law officers ===
- Lord Advocate – Andrew Rutherfurd
- Solicitor General for Scotland – Thomas Maitland; then James Moncreiff

=== Judiciary ===
- Lord President of the Court of Session and Lord Justice General – Lord Boyle
- Lord Justice Clerk – Lord Glencorse

== Events ==
- 1 April – Aberdeen Railway opens to a terminus at Ferryhill, Aberdeen.
- 15 April – iron paddle steamer SS City of Glasgow, built by Tod & Macgregor of Partick, makes her maiden voyage as the first steamer on the Glasgow–New York route.
- 18 June – paddle steamer Orion sinks off Portpatrick through the negligence of her master with the loss of 50 lives.
- 17 October – James Young patents a method of distilling paraffin from coal, laying the foundations for the Scottish paraffin industry.
- December – destitute Gaelic speakers from the island of Barra begin to appear in Glasgow, displaced by the Highland Clearances.
- Cox Brothers open the Camperdown Works in Dundee which will become the world's largest jute works.
- Remodelling of Dunrobin Castle completed.
- Skara Brae revealed by weather.

== Births ==
- 4 February – Thomas Lomar Gray, seismologist (died 1908 in the United States)
- 24 April – Murdo MacKenzie, businessman (died 1939 in the United States)
- 30 April – George Gibb, transport administrator (died 1925 in London)
- 12 May – Charles McLaren, 1st Baron Aberconway, jurist, landowner, industrialist and Unionist politician (died 1934 in London)
- 27 May – Thomas Neill Cream, the "Lambeth Poisoner", serial killer (hanged 1897 in London)
- 14 June – Eliza Humphreys, née Gollan (pen name 'Rita'), novelist (died 1938 in England)
- 13 August – Peter Drummond, steam locomotive engineer (died 1918)
- 22 August – William Morrison, chemist, creator of an electric carriage (died 1927 in the United States)
- 13 November – Robert Louis Stevenson, novelist, poet, essayist and travel writer (died 1894 in Samoa)
- 11 December – Mary Victoria Douglas-Hamilton, married into European nobility (died 1922 in Budapest)

== Deaths ==
- 26 January – Francis Jeffrey, Lord Jeffrey, judge and literary critic (born 1773)
- 5 June – Thomas Brown, architect (born 1781)
- 18 June – John Burns, surgeon (born 1775) (in PS Orion disaster)
- 12 July – Robert Stevenson, civil engineer noted for lighthouses (born 1772)
- 3 December – John Gibb, civil engineer and contractor (born 1776)
- 29 December – William Hamilton Maxwell, novelist (born 1792 in Ireland)
- Approximate date – Walter Sutherland, last native speaker of the Norn language on Unst

== See also ==
- Timeline of Scottish history
- 1850 in Ireland
