= 1917 in Scotland =

- Centuries: 18th; 19th; 20th; 21st
- Decades: 1890s; 1900s; 1910s; 1920s; 1930s
- See also: List of years in Scotland; Timeline of Scottish history 1917 in: The UK • Wales • Elsewhere; Scottish football: 1916–17 • 1917–18

Events from the year 1917 in Scotland.

== Incumbents ==
- Secretary for Scotland and Keeper of the Great Seal – Robert Munro

=== Law officers ===
- Lord Advocate – James Avon Clyde
- Solicitor General for Scotland – Thomas Brash Morison

=== Judiciary ===
- Lord President of the Court of Session and Lord Justice General – Lord Strathclyde
- Lord Justice Clerk – Lord Dickson
- Chairman of the Scottish Land Court – Lord Kennedy

== Events ==
- 3 January – Ratho rail crash in which North British Railway H class locomotive 874 Dunedin in charge of the Edinburgh to Glasgow express train is in collision with a light engine at Queensferry Junction, leaving 12 people dead and 46 seriously injured. The cause is found to be inadequate signalling procedures.
- 5 January – Stornoway Gazette first published.
- 29 January – Royal Navy steam-powered submarine HMS K13 sinks on trial in the Gare Loch with the loss of 32 men; 48 are rescued.
- 7 February – the Clyde-built Atlantic liner SS California (1907), homeward bound for Glasgow from New York, is torpedoed and sunk by SM U-85 approaching Ireland. 41 are killed but around 162 survivors return to Glasgow.
- 9 April–16 May – Battle of Arras on the Western Front (World War I) – 44 Scottish battalions advance alongside seven Canadian Scottish battalions.
- 1 May – Imperial German Navy Zeppelins L 43 and L 45 conduct reconnaissance patrols over the North Sea off the coast of Scotland, above the Firth of Forth and Aberdeen, respectively.
- 26 June – First branch of the Scottish Women's Rural Institutes founded in Longniddry.
- 9 July – HMS Vanguard is blown apart by an internal explosion at her moorings in Scapa Flow, Orkney, killing an estimated 843 crew with no survivors.

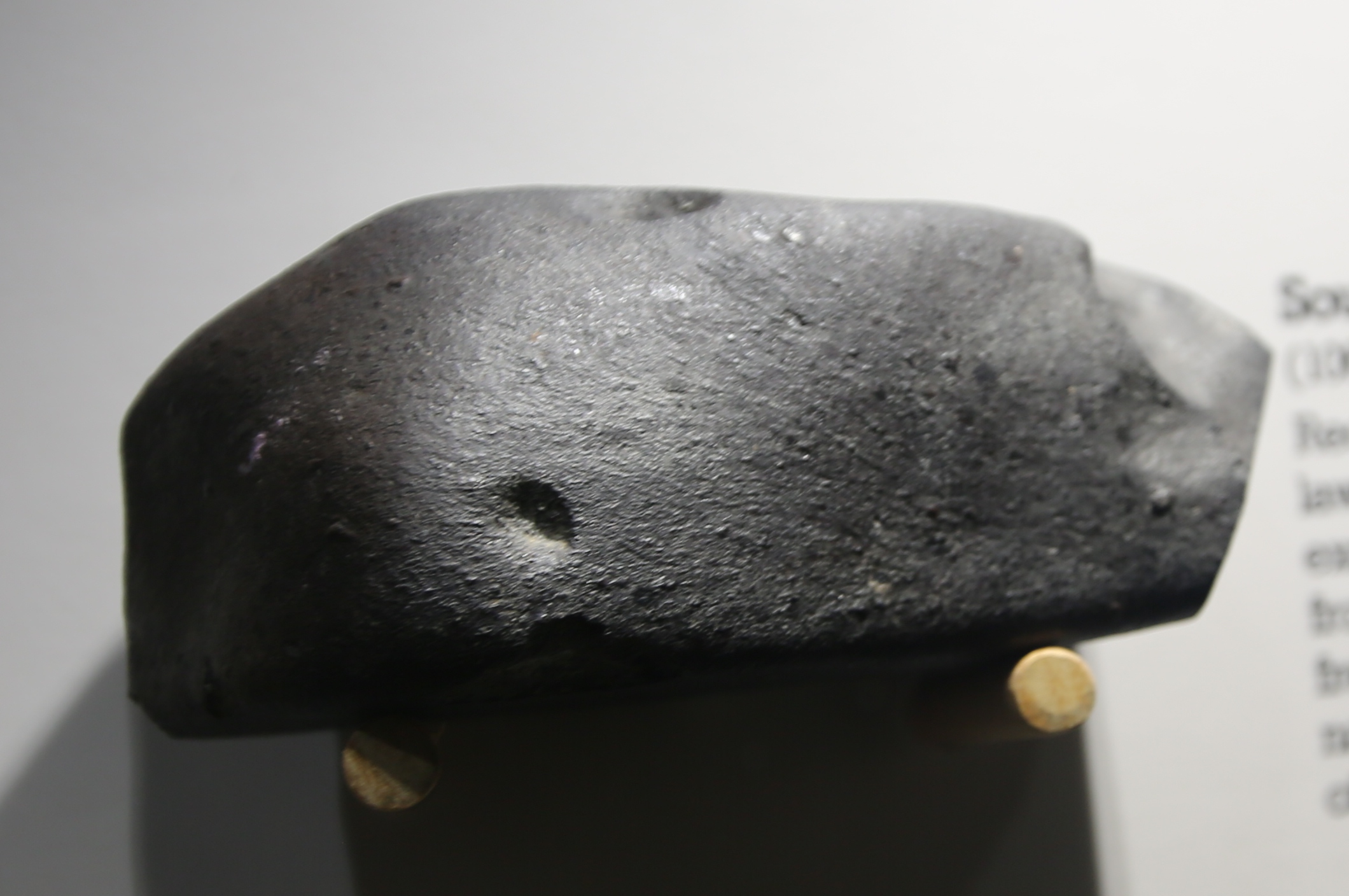
The South Corston fragment of the Strathmore meteorite

- 2 August – Squadron Commander E.H. Dunning becomes the first pilot to land his aircraft on a ship when he lands his Sopwith Pup on HMS Furious in Scapa Flow but is killed five days later during another landing on the ship.
- 23 August – start of lockout at Pullars dyeing works in Perth.
- October – first North British Railway C Class steam locomotives are allocated for loan to the Royal Engineers' Railway Operating Division on the Western Front.
- 3 December – Strathmore meteorite falls in Perthshire.
- The Great Channel in the Inner Moray Firth is dredged.

== Births ==
- 27 February – George Mitchell, musician, best known for devising The Black and White Minstrel Show (died 2002 in England)
- 15 May – Anna Macleod, biochemist, world's first female professor of brewing and biochemistry (died 2004)
- 18 May – James Donald, actor (died 1993 in England)
- 10 June – Ruari McLean, typographic designer (died 2006)
- 14 August – Donald MacLeod, Seaforth Highlanders pipe major, composer and bagpipe instructor (died 1982)
- 26 September – Phillip Clancey, leading authority on the ornithology of South Africa (died 2001 in South Africa)
- 16 October – Murray MacLehose, Governor of Hong Kong (died 2000)
- 14 December – Alberto Morrocco, artist and teacher (died 1998)
- 31 December – John Fox Watson, footballer (Fulham, Real Madrid, Crystal Palace) (died 1976 in Southend-on-Sea)

== Deaths ==
- 17 March – Hippolyte Blanc, architect, best known for his church buildings in the Gothic Revival style (born 1844)
- 13 May – Benjamin Blyth II, civil engineer (born 1849)
- 22 October – William Hole, English artist, illustrator, etcher and engraver, known for his industrial, historical and biblical scenes (born 1846 in Salisbury)
- 1 December – George Henry Tatham Paton, army captain, posthumous recipient of the Victoria Cross, mortally wounded in action in France (born 1895)
- 27 December – George Diamandy, Romanian revolutionary socialist politician, social scientist, dramatist, journalist, diplomat, archaeologist and landowner, died and buried at sea off Shetland (born 1867 in Romania)

== The arts ==
- 17 August – one of English literature's most important and famous meetings takes place when Wilfred Owen introduces himself to fellow poet Siegfried Sassoon at Craiglockhart War Hospital in Edinburgh.
- November – Glasgow watercolourist Frederick Farrell (who was discharged from army service as a sapper a year earlier on health grounds) serves as a war artist on the Western Front; uniquely sponsored by the city of his birth, the only British city to sponsor a painter.
- Joseph Lee (who is made a prisoner of war later this year) publishes the poetry collection Work-a-Day Warriors.
- Ewart Alan Mackintosh (who is killed on 23 November in the Battle of Cambrai) publishes A Highland Regiment and Other Poems.
- Doric dialect poet and soldier Charles Murray publishes The Sough o' War.

== See also ==
- Timeline of Scottish history
- 1917 in Ireland
