= 1904 in Scotland =

- Centuries: 18th; 19th; 20th; 21st
- Decades: 1880s; 1890s; 1900s; 1910s; 1920s
- See also: List of years in Scotland; Timeline of Scottish history 1904 in: The UK • Wales • Elsewhere; Scottish football: 1903–04 • 1904–05

Events from the year 1904 in Scotland.

== Incumbents ==
- Secretary for Scotland and Keeper of the Great Seal – Andrew Murray

=== Law officers ===
- Lord Advocate – Charles Dickson
- Solicitor General for Scotland – David Dundas

=== Judiciary ===
- Lord President of the Court of Session and Lord Justice General – Lord Blair Balfour
- Lord Justice Clerk – Lord Kingsburgh

== Events ==
- 28 June – the Danish liner SS Norge is wrecked off Rockall with the loss of 635 lives.
- 1 August – a judgement on appeal to the House of Lords in the case of Bannatyne v Overtoun (in which the minority Free Church of Scotland challenged the new United Free Church of Scotland) is delivered.
- 17 September – new St Columba Church of Scotland, Glasgow, opened.
- 31 December – Glasgow-registered cargo steamers Stromboli and Kathleen collide and sink at Garvel Point, Greenock.
- Hyskeir Lighthouse completed.
- The Edinburgh Museum of Science and Art is renamed as the Royal Scottish Museum.
- Boroughmuir High School, Edinburgh, founded.
- First West Highland White Terrier breed club set up.

== Births ==
- 4 January – Erik Chisholm, composer (died 1965 in South Africa)
- 26 April – Jimmy McGrory, international footballer and manager (died 1982)
- 28 May – Anne Gillespie Shaw, engineer and businesswoman (died 1982)
- 25 June – Patrick Balfour, 3rd Baron Kinross, historian and biographer (died 1976)
- 14 August – Lindley Fraser, academic economist and broadcaster (died 1963 in London)
- 23 August – William Primrose, violist (died in Provo, Utah 1982)
- 20 October – Tommy Douglas, Premier of Saskatchewan and pioneer of medicare (died 1986 in Canada)
- 3 November – Jennie Lee, politician (died 1988)
- 20 November – John MacCormick, lawyer and advocate of Home Rule for Scotland (died 1961)
- Edward Baird, painter (died 1949)
- Margaret MacDonald, royal servant (died 1993)
- Alex Moffat, miner, trade unionist and communist activist (died 1967)

== Deaths ==
- 16 April – Samuel Smiles, author and reformer (born 1812)
- 25 May – David Sime Cargill, industrialist (born 1826)
- 19 June – Mungo Park, golfer (born 1836)
- 7 October – Isabella Bird, traveller (born 1831 in Yorkshire)
- 12 November – George Lennox Watson, naval architect (born 1851)
- 25 December – James Brown, poet and essayist, known as J. B. Selkirk (born 1832)

== The arts ==
- 29 February – the Pavilion Theatre, Glasgow, opens as a music hall.
- 12 September – the King's Theatre, Glasgow, opens.
- 27 December – J. M. Barrie's stage play Peter Pan, or The Boy Who Wouldn't Grow Up premières at the Duke of York's Theatre in London.
- Hill House, Helensburgh, designed by Charles Rennie Mackintosh, is completed.

== See also ==
- Timeline of Scottish history
- 1904 in Ireland
