= PS Briton =

British paddle steamer

History

United Kingdom
- Name: PS Briton
- Owner: 1862: Glasgow & Stranraer Steam Packet Co.; 1863: Bristol General Steam Nav Co.; 1877: Bristol Steam Nav Co Ltd; 1890: Waterford Steamship Company
- Route: 1862 – 63: Stranraer – Larne; 1864 – 66: Bristol – Waterford; 1867 – 90: Bristol – Wexford
- Builder: Tod & McGregor, Glasgow
- Yard number: 121
- Launched: June 1862
- Completed: July 1862
- In service: 1862
- Fate: Scrapped – 1892 at Bristol

General characteristics
- Class & type: Iron Paddle Steamer
- Tonnage: 349 GRT (1876: 486 GRT)
- Length: 176ft (1876: 207ft)
- Beam: 25ft
- Installed power: steam 2cy 100nhp

PS Briton was a paddle steamer that inaugurated the Stranraer to Larne service.

== Service ==
PS Briton inaugurated the Stranraer to Larne crossing, but the service was not a success and was withdrawn after 18 months, in 1863. Following this, she operated from Bristol to the South of Ireland, to Waterford between 1864 and 1866 and to Wexford between 1867 and 1890. Her final year was spent under the ownership of the Waterford Steamship Company.
