= 1905 in Scotland =

- Centuries: 18th; 19th; 20th; 21st
- Decades: 1880s; 1890s; 1900s; 1910s; 1920s
- See also: List of years in Scotland; Timeline of Scottish history 1905 in: The UK • Wales • Elsewhere; Scottish football: 1904–05 • 1905–06

Events from the year 1905 in Scotland.

== Incumbents ==
- Secretary for Scotland and Keeper of the Great Seal – Andrew Murray until 2 February; then The Marquess of Linlithgow until 4 December; then John Sinclair

=== Law officers ===
- Lord Advocate – Charles Dickson until December; then Thomas Shaw
- Solicitor General for Scotland – David Dundas; then Edward Theodore Salvesen; then James Avon Clyde; then Alexander Ure

=== Judiciary ===
- Lord President of the Court of Session and Lord Justice General – Lord Blair Balfour until 22 January; then from 4 February Lord Dunedin
- Lord Justice Clerk – Lord Kingsburgh

== Events ==
- January – Strathaven Academy opens.
- 28 September – Talla Reservoir officially opened to serve the Edinburgh district after 10 years of construction (supply begins May).
- 31 October – Perth Corporation Tramways commence electric operation.
- 18 November – First rugby match between New Zealand and Scotland, played at Murrayfield.
- 19 November – 39 men are killed in a fire at a model lodging house in Watson Street, Glasgow.
- St Paul's Cathedral, Dundee, raised to cathedral status in the Episcopal Church.
- David Couper Thomson sets up the Dundee publisher D. C. Thomson & Co.
- Scottish Motor Traction is set up in Edinburgh as a motor bus operator.
- Victoria Bridge, Mar Lodge Estate, erected.
- Approximate date – the earliest Rolls-Royce 10 hp car to survive into the 21st century is acquired by Kenneth Gillies of Tain; it remains in Scotland until the time of World War I.

== Births ==
- 6 April – Johnny Ramensky, career criminal, employed as a commando for his safe-cracking abilities (died 1972)
- 19 April – Jim Mollison, aviator (died 1959)
- 12 May – Alex Jackson, international footballer (died 1946)
- 12 July – John Maxwell, landscape painter (died 1962)
- 19 July – Robert Hurd, influential conservation architect (died 1963)
- 20 August – Duncan Macrae, actor (died 1967)
- 6 September – William McEwan Younger, brewer and Unionist politician (died 1992 in England)
- 4 October – Leslie Mitchell, announcer (died 1985 in London)
- 9 December – Janet Adam Smith, writer and mountaineer (died 1999)
- Norman Cameron, poet (born in Bombay; died 1953 in London)
- Fred Hartley, light music composer and conductor (died 1980)

== Deaths ==
- 21 January – Robert Brough, painter, died in a railway disaster (born 1872)
- 5 August – Alexander Asher, Liberal politician and Solicitor General for Scotland (born 1834)
- 16 August – Jamie Anderson, golfer (born 1842)
- 22 August – David Binning Monro, Homeric scholar (born 1836)
- 18 September – George MacDonald, author, poet and Christian minister (born 1844)
- 8 October – Allan MacDonald, Roman Catholic priest, poet, folklore collector and activist (born 1859)
- 27 October – Ralph Copeland, Astronomer Royal for Scotland (born 1837 in England)
- 7 November – Lady Florence Caroline Dixie, traveller, war correspondent, writer and feminist (born 1855)
- 12 December – William Sharp, poet and literary biographer (born 1855)

== The arts ==
- 16 January – Neil Munro begins publishing his Vital Spark stories in the Glasgow Evening News.
- Harry Lauder writes the popular song "I Love a Lassie".

== See also ==
- Timeline of Scottish history
- 1905 in Ireland
