= James Hay Beattie =

- Born: 1768
- Died: 1790 (aged 21–22)

James Hay Beattie (6 November 1768 – 19 November 1790) was a Scottish scholar, the son of Dr. James Beattie, author of the Minstrel.

== Life ==
He was born in Aberdeen on 6 November 1768. Having received the rudiments of his education at the grammar school of his native city, he was entered, in his thirteenth year, as a student in Marischal College. From the first he showed premature capacity. He took his degree of M.A. in 1786. In June 1787, when he was not quite nineteen, on the unanimous recommendation of the Senatus Academicus of Marischal College, he was appointed by the king "assistant professor and successor to his father" in the chair of moral philosophy and logic. Although very young, he fulfilled the requirements of his position. He was studious and variously cultured, being especially devoted to music.

But his career was destined to be brief. On 30 November 1789, he was prostrated by fever. He lingered in "uttermost weakness" for a year, and died 19 November 1790, in his twenty-second year. In 1794, his heart-broken father privately printed his "Remains" in prose and verse, and prefixed a "Life". The book was published in 1799.
