= 1923 in Scotland =

- Centuries: 18th; 19th; 20th; 21st
- Decades: 1900s; 1910s; 1920s; 1930s; 1940s
- See also: List of years in Scotland; Timeline of Scottish history 1923 in: The UK • Wales • Elsewhere; Scottish football: 1922–23 • 1923–24

Events from the year 1923 in Scotland.

== Incumbents ==
- Secretary for Scotland and Keeper of the Great Seal – The Viscount Novar

=== Law officers ===
- Lord Advocate – William Watson
- Solicitor General for Scotland – David Fleming; then Frederick Thomson

=== Judiciary ===
- Lord President of the Court of Session and Lord Justice General – Lord Clyde
- Lord Justice Clerk – Lord Alness
- Chairman of the Scottish Land Court – Lord St Vigeans

== Events ==
- 1 January – Grouping of virtually all British railway companies. The Caledonian (from 1 July), Highland and Glasgow and South Western Railways are merged into the London, Midland and Scottish Railway; and the North British and Great North of Scotland Railways into the London and North Eastern Railway.
- 6 March – First BBC radio broadcast from Glasgow (station 5SC).
- 19 March – First BBC radio outside broadcast in Scotland, from the Coliseum Theatre, Glasgow.
- 23 March – Cutty Sark whisky blended.
- 29 May — The General Assembly of the Church of Scotland calls for curbs on the immigration of Irish Catholics following a Report laid before it earlier that same month.
- 24 June – Edinburgh Corporation Tramways completes conversion from cable to electric traction.
- 13 July — Margaret Kidd becomes the first female member of the Scottish bar.
- 12 August–8 November – Eallabus on Islay records 89 successive rain-days, a British record.
- 25 September – 40 coal miners are killed when the pit at Redding, Falkirk floods.
- 10 October
  - First BBC radio broadcast from Aberdeen (station 2BD).
  - Susan Newell (born 1893) undergoes judicial hanging at Duke Street Prison, Glasgow, for infanticide, the last woman to suffer capital punishment in Scotland (and the first for 70 years in Glasgow).
- 2 December – First BBC radio broadcast in Gaelic, a religious address from Aberdeen.
- 6 December – United Kingdom general election. Katharine Stewart-Murray, Duchess of Atholl, is elected as Unionist Party MP for Kinross and Western Perthshire.

== Births ==
- 15 January
  - John Christopher Bartholomew, cartographer and geographer (died 2008)
  - Ivor Cutler, poet, songwriter and humorist (died 2006)
- 19 March – Bobby Brown, international football goalkeeper and manager (died 2020)
- 23 March – Roddy McMillan, actor and playwright (died 1979)
- 24 April – Cordelia Oliver, journalist, painter and art critic (died 2009)
- 15 May – James Gilbert, television producer (died 2016)
- 18 May – Willie McRae, Scottish National Party politician and lawyer (died 1985)
- May – Pat Smythe, jazz pianist (died 1983 in London)
- 25 August – Dorothy Dunnett, historical novelist (died 2001)
- 9 September – Mitchell Downie, footballer (died 2001)
- 18 October – James Gowan, architect known for his post-modernist designs (died 2015 in London)
- 21 October – David Brand, Lord Brand, advocate, sheriff and Senator of the College of Justice (died 1996)
- 25 October – Bobby Thomson, professional baseball player (died 2010 in Savannah, Georgia)
- 26 October – Norman Wylie, Lord Wylie, politician (died 2005)
- 14 December – Janet Brown, actress, comedienne and impressionist, famous for impersonations of Margaret Thatcher (died 2011 in Hove)
- 19 December – Gordon Jackson, screen actor (died 1990)

== Deaths ==
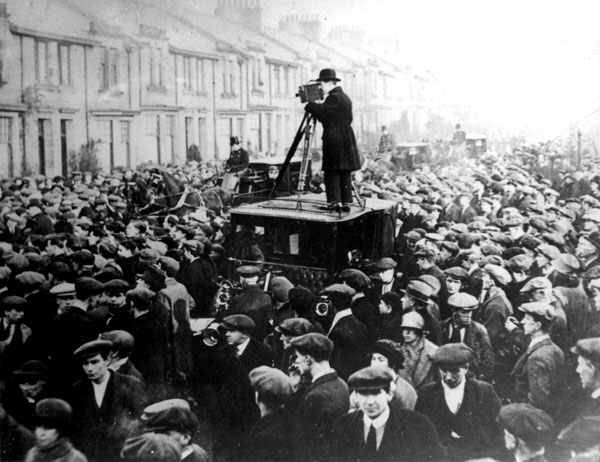
Revolutionary socialist John Maclean died this year aged 44; the picture shows his casket being removed from his home in Pollokshaws

- 27 March – James Dewar, chemist and physicist (born 1842)
- 4 May – William Robertson Nicoll, Free Church minister, journalist, editor and man of letters (born 1851)
- 4 June – Hume Nisbet, writer and artist (born 1849)
- 25 June – John Annan Bryce, businessman and Liberal politician (born 1841)
- 29 June – Sir James Reid, 1st Baronet, physician (born 1849)
- 17 July – William Paton Ker, scholar and essayist (born 1855)
- 26 September – Sir Mark MacTaggart-Stewart, Conservative politician (born 1834)
- 28 September – William York Macgregor, landscape painter (born 1855)
- 30 November – John Maclean, Marxist (born 1879)
- 26 December – James Stout Angus, Shetland writer (born 1830)
- William Robertson, industrialist (born 1856)

== The arts ==
- 28 November — The Royal Scottish Country Dance Society is founded by Jean Milligan and Ysobel Stewart.
- John Buchan's novel Midwinter is published.

== See also ==
- Timeline of Scottish history
- 1923 in Northern Ireland
