= Isobel Hogg Kerr Beattie =

- Born: 25 August 1900
- Died: 13 July 1970 (age 69); Applegarth
- Occupation: Architect

Isobel Hogg Kerr Beattie (25 August 1900 – 13 July 1970) was possibly the first woman in Scotland to practice architecture on a regular basis.

== Early life ==
Beattie was born in 1900 to Lewis Beattie and Alice Walker Kerr, who were farmers. She graduated from the Edinburgh College of Art (1921–1926), but some of the more technical courses were taken at Heriot-Watt College. In the 1922 merit list she is noted as having taken Building Construction Stage III, gaining 57% in the exam, followed by Stage IV (71%). In 1923 she gained 79% in its Stage V exam and in 1924 took Mechanics and Strength of Materials, 2nd year – one of a number of courses put on specially for the College of Art students – gaining 51%.

== Career ==
Beattie worked for a time in an office before practising independently from 1928 to 1929. She then returned to the College of Art where she obtained a further diploma. She was admitted as an Associate of the Royal Institute of British Architects in 1931 while she was working in Edinburgh with the firm, Jamieson & Arnott. She later moved to Dumfries, probably working there independently; she worked in a room in an architectural office in Castle Street, Dumfries.

== Death and legacy ==
She died in Applegarth in 1970 after an illness, at the age of 69. The National Monuments Record of Scotland has a collection of slides related to her work.
