= 1777 in Scotland =

- Centuries: 16th; 17th; 18th; 19th; 20th
- Decades: 1750s; 1760s; 1770s; 1780s; 1790s
- See also: List of years in Scotland; Timeline of Scottish history 1777 in: Great Britain • Wales • Elsewhere

Events from the year 1777 in Scotland.

== Incumbents ==
=== Law officers ===
- Lord Advocate – Henry Dundas;
- Solicitor General for Scotland – Alexander Murray

=== Judiciary ===
- Lord President of the Court of Session – Lord Arniston, the younger
- Lord Justice General – Duke of Queensberry
- Lord Justice Clerk – Lord Barskimming

== Events ==
- 21 June – Encyclopædia Britannica Second Edition begins publication in Edinburgh.
- 11 September – first minister ordained to United Presbyterian Church, Thurso; first church building opens this year.
- 73rd (Highland) Regiment of Foot (MacLeod's Highlanders) raised.
- Erskine Ferry established.

== Births ==
- 22 January – Joseph Hume, army surgeon and radical politician (died 1855 in London)
- 3 February – John Cheyne, physician (died 1836 in England)
- 24 June – John Ross, naval officer and Arctic explorer (died 1856 in London)
- 26 July – Robert Hamilton Bishop, Presbyterian minister and educator (died 1855 in the United States)
- 27 July – Thomas Campbell, poet (died 1844 in France)
- 21 December – John Campbell, 7th Duke of Argyll, peer and Whig politician (born in London; died 1847)

== Deaths ==
- 3 January – William Leslie, British Army captain (born 1751; killed at Battle of Princeton)
- 12 January – Hugh Mercer, surgeon and American Continental Army brigadier general (born 1726; died of injuries received at Battle of Princeton)
- 13 January – James Rait, Episcopalian Bishop of Brechin since 1742 (born 1689)
- 23 March – Sir Hugh Paterson, 2nd Baronet, Jacobite (born 1685)
- 7 October – Simon Fraser of Balnain, British Army general (born 1729 in Scotland; killed at Battle of Bemis Heights)

== Sport ==
- Fraserburgh Golf Club established.
- Wanlockhead curling club established.

== See also ==
- Timeline of Scottish history
