= 1922 in Scotland =

- Centuries: 18th; 19th; 20th; 21st
- Decades: 1900s; 1910s; 1920s; 1930s; 1940s
- See also: List of years in Scotland; Timeline of Scottish history 1922 in: The UK • Wales • Elsewhere; Scottish football: 1921–22 • 1922–23

Events from the year 1922 in Scotland.

== Incumbents ==
- Secretary for Scotland and Keeper of the Great Seal – Robert Munro until 19 October; then The Viscount Novar

=== Law officers ===
- Lord Advocate – Thomas Brash Morison until March; then Charles David Murray until November; then William Watson
- Solicitor General for Scotland – Charles David Murray until March; then Andrew Constable until July; then William Watson until November; then David Fleming

=== Judiciary ===
- Lord President of the Court of Session and Lord Justice General – Lord Clyde
- Lord Justice Clerk – Lord Dickson, then Lord Alness
- Chairman of the Scottish Land Court – Lord St Vigeans

== Events ==
- 7 March – Charles David Murray appointed Lord Advocate, replacing Thomas Brash Morison.
- 17 March – Andrew Constable appointed as Solicitor General for Scotland, replacing Charles David Murray.
- 28 May – Prohibition begins in Wick, Caithness.
- 10 July – William Watson appointed as Solicitor General for Scotland, replacing Andrew Constable.
- 14–21 August – Loch Maree Hotel botulism poisoning, first recorded outbreak in the United Kingdom.
- 8–9 September – first King's Cup Race for aeroplanes, flown on a return course from London to Glasgow.
- 1 October – Carfin Grotto, a Roman Catholic shrine dedicated to Our Lady of Lourdes, is dedicated.
- 17 October – first Hunger March sets out, from Glasgow to London.
- 18 October – the British Broadcasting Company (BBC) is formed with John Reith as its first general manager.
- 2 November – William Watson appointed Lord Advocate, replacing Charles David Murray.
- 15 November – 1922 UK general election. Helen Fraser is the first woman to stand in Scotland as an official candidate for any party. Defending his seat in Dundee for the Liberal Party, Winston Churchill comes fourth in the poll; the two-member constituency is taken by Edwin Scrymgeour, uniquely winning for the Scottish Prohibition Party, and the radical E. D. Morel for the Labour Party.
- 16 November – David Fleming appointed Solicitor General for Scotland, replacing William Watson.
- 1 December – The Aberdeen Press & Journal is first published under this title following a merger.
- The UK Government purchases the islands of Raasay and South Rona from their private landlords.

== Births ==
- 11 January – William Turnbull, sculptor (died 2012 in London)
- 14 March – Kenneth Alexander, economist and university administrator (died 2001)
- 21 April – Alistair MacLean, adventure novelist (died 1987 in Germany)
- 11 June – Douglas Campbell, Scottish-Canadian actor and screenwriter (died 2009 in Canada)
- 6 June – Iain Hamilton, composer (died 2000 in London)
- 31 July – Ewan Cameron, physician and medical researcher (died 1991)
- 12 August – Fulton Mackay, television actor (died 1987 in London)
- 5 October – Jock Stein, footballer and manager (died 1985)
- 23 October – Nicholas Stuart Gray, actor, playwright and children's author (died 1981)
- 28 October – Cliff Hanley, writer (died 1999)
- 30 November – Graham Crowden, actor (died 2010)

== Deaths ==
- 18 March – Edward Arthur Walton, painter (born 1860)
- 15 April – Osgood Mackenzie, landowner (born 1842)
- 22 April – James Souttar, architect (born 1842 in London)
- 2 August – Alexander Graham Bell, scientist, inventor, engineer and innovator (born 1847)
- 24 September - James Ormiston Affleck physician and medical author (born 1840
- 19 October – Gavin Campbell, 1st Marquess of Breadalbane, Liberal politician and last Keeper of the Privy Seal of Scotland (born 1851 in Ireland)
- 28 October – Alexander Crum Brown, organic chemist (born 1838)
- Charles Macintosh, folk music composer and performer and mycologist (born 1839)
- Alexander Wilson, photographer (born in Duns)

== The arts ==
- Marion Angus's first collection of poetry, The Lilt and Other Verses, written in the Scots language, is published in Aberdeen.
- John Buchan's novel Huntingtower, first of the Dickson McCunn trilogy, is published.
- Catherine Carswell's novel The Camomile is published.
- Sculptor James Pittendrigh Macgillivray's collection Bog-Myrtle and Peat Reek: verse mainly in the North & South country dialects of Scotland is published in Edinburgh.
- Lady Margaret Sackville's A Masque of Edinburgh is published and performed at the Music Hall, George Street, Edinburgh.

== See also ==
- Timeline of Scottish history
- 1922 in Northern Ireland
