= 1851 in Scotland =

- Centuries: 17th; 18th; 19th; 20th; 21st
- Decades: 1830s; 1840s; 1850s; 1860s; 1870s
- See also: List of years in Scotland; Timeline of Scottish history 1851 in: The UK • Wales • Elsewhere

Events from the year 1851 in Scotland.

== Incumbents ==
=== Law officers ===
- Lord Advocate – Andrew Rutherfurd until April; then James Moncreiff
- Solicitor General for Scotland – James Moncreiff; then John Cowan; then George Deas

=== Judiciary ===
- Lord President of the Court of Session and Lord Justice General – Lord Boyle
- Lord Justice Clerk – Lord Glencorse

== Events ==
- 9 March – Robert Eden is consecrated as first Bishop of Moray and Ross in the Scottish Episcopal Church, an office he will hold until his death in 1886.
- 15 March – Explosion at Victoria Pit colliery, Nitshill kills 61 men and boys.
- 30/31 March – United Kingdom census: Scotland's population is recorded as 2.89 million; about 7% are of Irish birth.
- Cathedral of the Isles opened in Millport, Cumbrae, within the Episcopal Church's Diocese of Argyll and The Isles.
- Donaldson's Hospital opens in Edinburgh, primarily for the education of deaf children.
- Hebrides shipping services of Burns Brothers pass to David and Alexander Hutcheson and David MacBrayne as David Hutcheson & Co.
- Bell's whisky is first blended.
- St Leonard's Mill damask linen weaving factory established at Dunfermline by Erskine Beveridge.
- Publication of Daniel Wilson's The Archaeology and Prehistoric Annals of Scotland, which introduces the word prehistoric into the English archaeological vocabulary.
- James Valentine (photographer) establishes the printing business of Valentine & Sons in Dundee.

== Births ==
- March – James Lang, footballer
- 20 April – Young Tom Morris, golfer, youngest winner of The Open Championship (died 1875)
- 1 August – Daniel Macaulay Stevenson, shipbroker, Liberal politician and philanthropist (died 1944)
- 11 October – Lord Douglas Gordon, Liberal MP (died 1888)
- 30 October – George Lennox Watson, naval architect (died 1904)
- 27 December – Erskine Beveridge, textile manufacturer and antiquarian (died 1920)
- James Johnston, missionary (died 1921 in Jamaica)

== Deaths ==
- 6 July – David Macbeth Moir, physician and writer (born 1798)
- 20 October – Patrick Sellar, lawyer, factor and sheep farmer instrumental in the Highland Clearances (born 1780)
- 7 December – Sir John Gladstone, 1st Baronet, merchant (born 1764)

== The arts ==
- c. June – English artist Sir Edwin Landseer's painting of a Scottish stag, The Monarch of the Glen, is first exhibited, at the Royal Academy Summer Exhibition in London.

== See also ==
- Timeline of Scottish history
- 1851 in Ireland
