= Duncan McNeill, 1st Baron Colonsay =

Scottish advocate, judge and Tory politician (1793–1874)

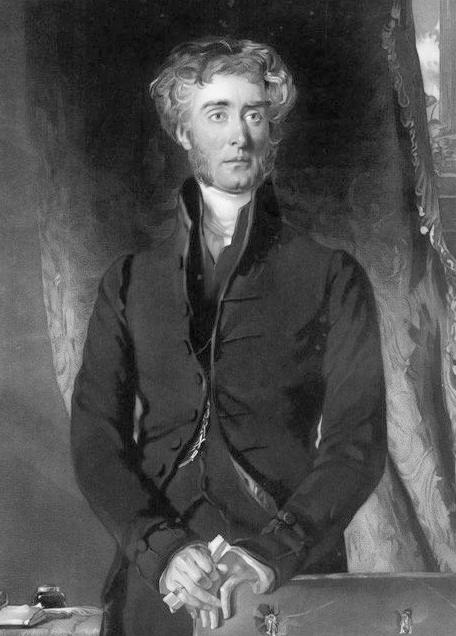
Duncan McNeill c. 1844

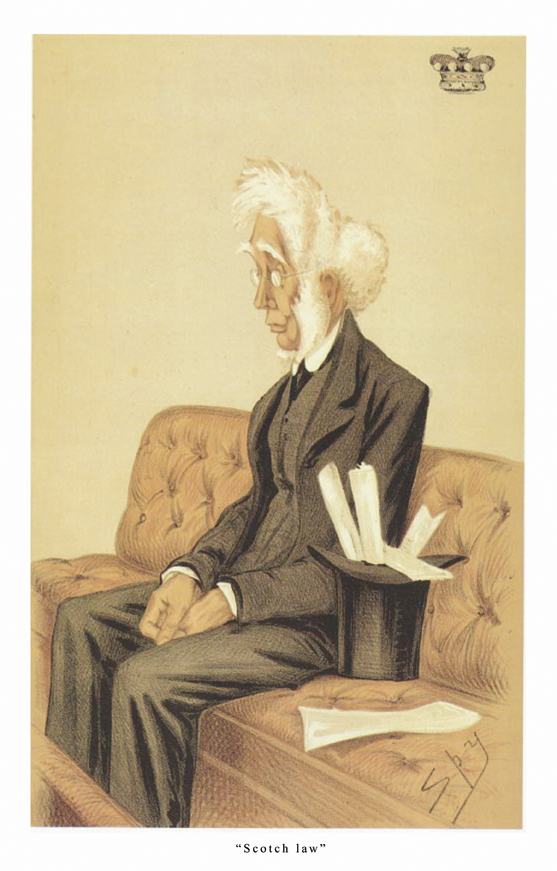
"Scotch Law" Lord Colonsay as caricatured by Spy (Leslie Ward) in Vanity Fair, September 1873

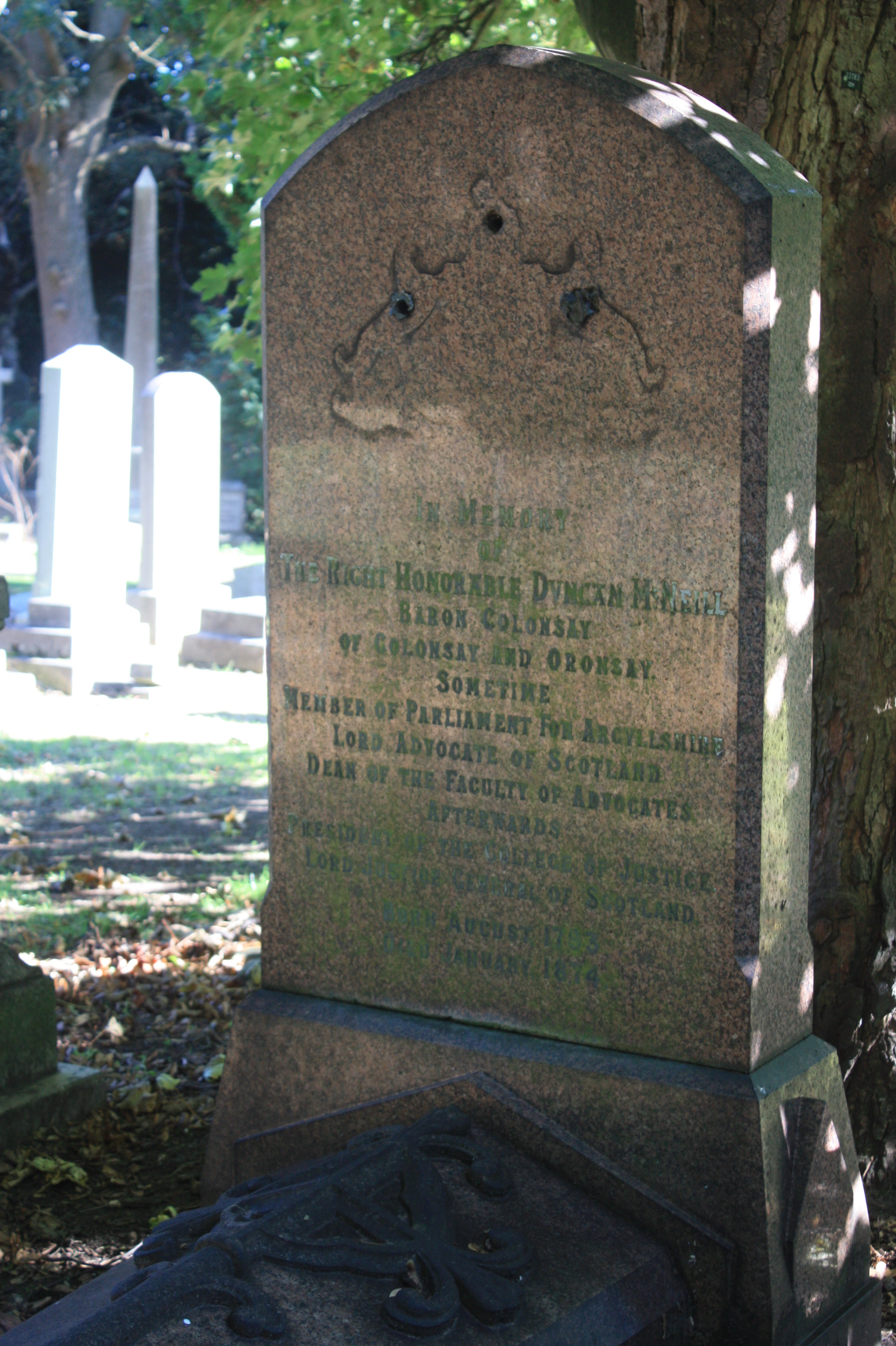
The grave of Duncan McNeill, Warriston Cemetery, Edinburgh

Duncan McNeill, 1st Baron Colonsay FRSE (20 August 1793 – 31 January 1874) was a Scottish advocate, judge and Tory politician. He was Lord Justice General and Lord President of the Court of Session between 1852 and 1867.

His younger brother was the physician and diplomat Sir John McNeill.

== Background and education ==
McNeill was born on the island of Oronsay in the Inner Hebrides, the son of John McNeill (1767–1846), laird of Colonsay and Oronsay, and his wife Hester (née McNeill). Educated at St Andrew's University where he graduated MA in 1809..

He served his apprenticeship in Edinburgh under Michael Linning WS, based at 6 St James Square. He became a member of the Faculty of Advocates in 1816. He was the presumptive father of philosopher Edmund Montgomery.

== Political, legal and judicial career ==
He was Advocate Depute in Edinburgh 1820 to 1824.

MacNeill was appointed Sheriff of Perthshire in 1824. He served under Sir Robert Peel as Solicitor General for Scotland from 1834 to 1835 and again from 1841 to 1842 and as Lord Advocate from 1842 to 1846. From 1843 to 1851 he sat as Member of Parliament for Argyllshire. In 1851 he was appointed a Senator of the College of Justice and an Ordinary Lord of Session as Lord Colonsay and Oronsay. He was Lord Justice General and Lord President of the Court of Session from 1852 to 1867, and was raised to the peerage as Baron Colonsay, of Colonsay and Oronsay in the County of Argyll, on 26 February 1867.

== Personal life ==
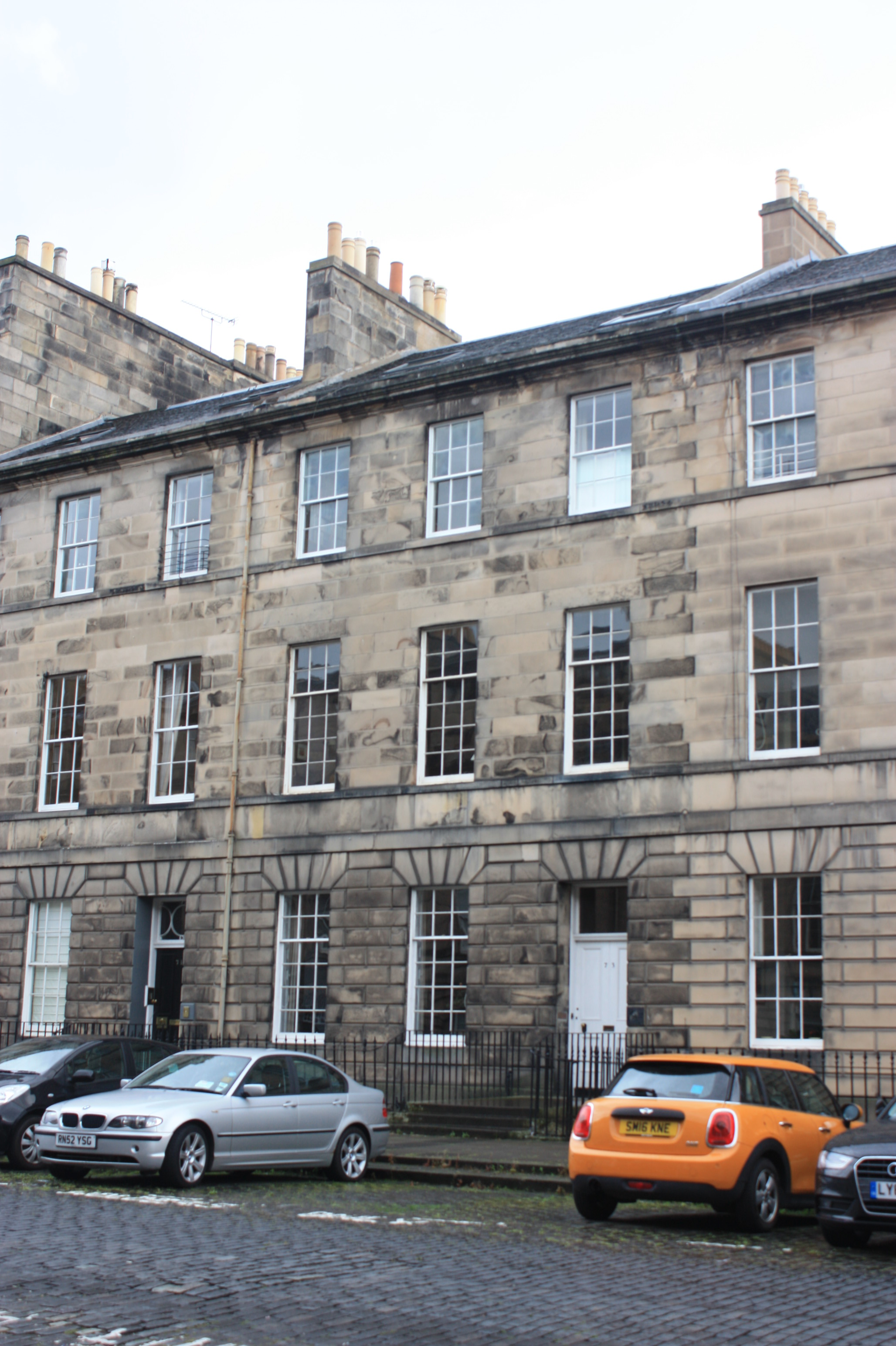
73 Great King Street, Edinburgh

In 1829 he was elected a Fellow of the Royal Society of Edinburgh his proposer being John Shank More.

In later life Edinburgh University awarded him an honorary doctorate (LLD).

McNeill was unmarried, but lived in a very large Georgian townhouse: 73 Great King Street in Edinburgh's Second New Town.

He was a member of the Highland Society of Edinburgh (1833).

Lord Colonsay died at Pau, France, on 31 January 1874, aged 80, when the title became extinct.

He was interred at Warriston Cemetery in Edinburgh, south of the upper east–west path towards the East Gate. His bronze coat of arms has been stolen from the monument.

== Coat of arms ==
Coat of arms of Duncan McNeill, 1st Baron Colonsay
Coronet A coronet of an Baron Crest A mailed arm and hand holding a dagger proper. Escutcheon Quarterly: 1st and 4th, azure a lion rampant argent; 2nd, argent a sinister hand couped fesseways in chief gules and in base wavy azure a salmon naiant of the first; 3rd, or, a galley, her oars in saltire gules on a chief of the last three mullets of the first; all within a bordure ermine. Supporters Two Highland deerhounds proper. Motto Vincere aur mori

Parliament of the United Kingdom
Preceded by Alexander Cameron Campbell	Member of Parliament for Argyllshire; 1843–1851	Succeeded by Sir Archibald Islay Campbell, Bt.
Legal offices
Preceded by Andrew Skene	Solicitor General for Scotland; 1834–1835	Succeeded by John Cunninghame
Preceded by Thomas Maitland	Solicitor General for Scotland; 1841–1842	Succeeded by Adam Anderson
Preceded by Sir William Rae, Bt	Lord Advocate; 1842–1846	Succeeded by Andrew Rutherfurd
Preceded by Lord Boyle	Lord Justice General; 1852–1867	Succeeded by Lord Glencorse
Peerage of the United Kingdom
New creation	Baron Colonsay; 1867–1874	Extinct
