= Thomas Miller, Lord Glenlee =

Scottish judge and politician

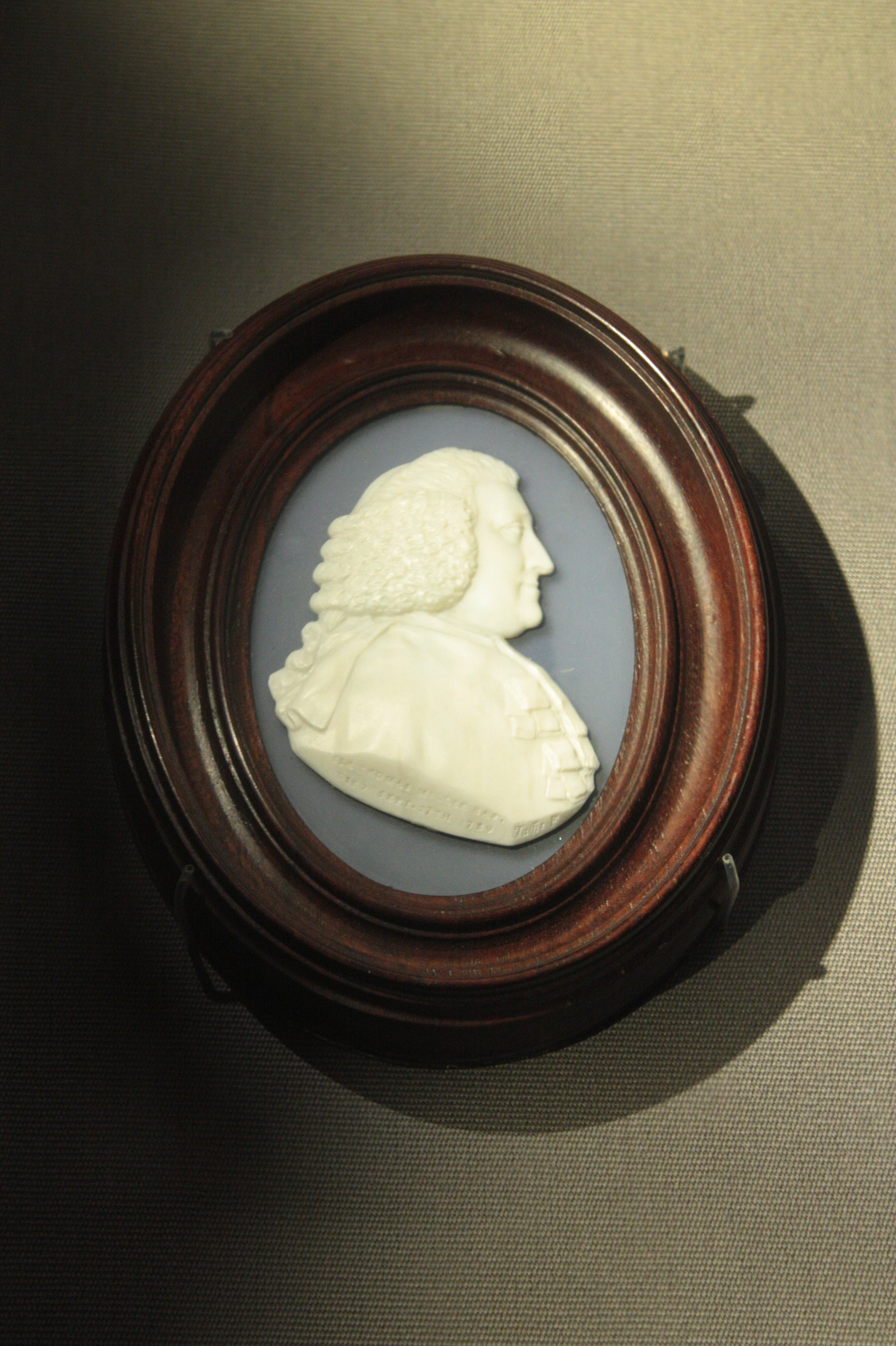
Cameo of Sir Thomas Miller, 1789, Scottish National Portrait Gallery

Sir Thomas Miller, 1st Baronet FRSE (3 November 1717 – 27 September 1789), known as Lord Barskimming (1766–88) and Lord Glenlee (from 1788) during his judicial service, was a Scottish advocate, judge, politician and landowner. He was a founder member of the Royal Society of Edinburgh in 1783, and served as the society's first vice-president, 1783 to 1786.

== Early life ==
He was born in Edinburgh on 3 November 1717 the second son of Janet Hamilton and her husband, William Miller of Glenlee WS, Kirkcudbrightshire, and of Barskimming in Ayrshire.

He studied law at the University of Glasgow (1730) and the University of Edinburgh (1738).

== Career ==
He was admitted to the Faculty of Advocates in 1742, appointed sheriff-depute of Kirkcudbright in 1748 and elected joint town-clerk of the city of Glasgow. In 1755 he resigned the office of sheriff-depute to become solicitor of the Excise in Scotland. He was appointed Solicitor General for Scotland in 1759, and promoted to Lord Advocate in 1760. From 1762 until 1764 he also held the title of Rector of the University of Glasgow.

He was Member of Parliament for Dumfries Burghs from 1761 to 1766, and Rector of the University of Glasgow from 1763. He was raised to the bench and appointed Lord Justice Clerk in 1766, taking the judicial title Lord Barskimming. In 1788, he became Lord President of the Court of Session and was created Lord Glenlee, Baronet of Glenlee, in the Stewartry of Kirkcudbright.

His Edinburgh address in 1775 was Browns Square. Around 1780 he bought the Dean estate, of Nisbet family fame, and lived at Dean House (later replaced by Dean Cemetery).

He died at Barskimming, Ayrshire, on 27 September 1789 and was interred in the family vault at Stair, Ayrshire.

== Family ==
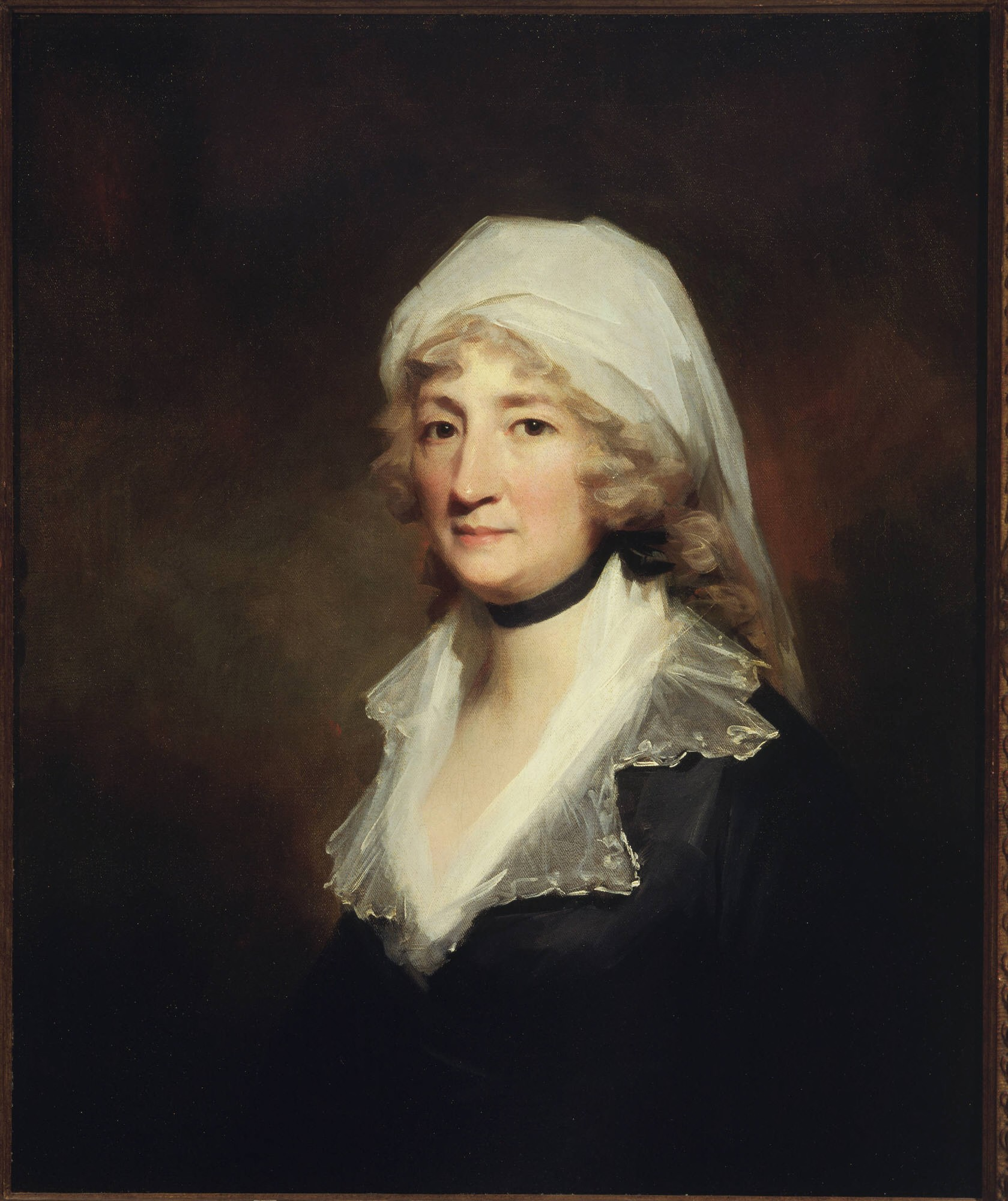
Lady Anne Miller of Glenlee, painting by Henry Raeburn, c. 1788-89.

In 1752 he married Margaret Murdoch daughter of John Murdoch of Rosebank, Lord Provost of Glasgow, and together they had one son Sir William Miller, Lord Glenlee (1755-1846). He married again in 1768 to Anne Lockhart.

He was brother to Patrick Miller of Dalswinton.

Parliament of Great Britain
Preceded by Archibald Douglas	Member of Parliament for Dumfries Burghs; 1761–1766	Succeeded by James William Montgomery
Legal offices
Preceded by Andrew Pringle of Alemore	Solicitor General for Scotland; 1759–1760	Succeeded by Sir James Montgomery; Francis Garden
Preceded by Robert Dundas of Arniston	Lord Advocate; 1760–1766	Succeeded by James Montgomery
Preceded by Lord Minto	Lord Justice Clerk; 1766–1787	Succeeded by Lord Braxfield
Preceded by Lord Arniston	Lord President of the Court of Session; 1787–1789	Succeeded by Sir Ilay Campbell
Academic offices
Preceded by Earl of Erroll	Rector of the University of Glasgow; 1763–1764	Succeeded by William Mure of Caldwell
Baronetage of Great Britain
New creation	Baronet (of Glenlee); 1788–1789	Succeeded by William Miller
