= Carter (name) =

- Pronunciation: /ˈkɑːrtər/
- Gender: Unisex

Origin
- Meaning: "transport goods by cart"
- Region of origin: Ireland, Scotland, England

Other names
- Variant form: McCarter McCarthy McCord McCourt Carty Cartier

Carter is an English language surname and given name that means "one who uses a cart" with presence throughout the British Isles including England, Ireland, and Scotland. It is derived from Anglo-Norman careter or caretier with linguistic root origins tracing from the Latin Carettarius ultimately originated from the Celtic word cairt, meaning "cart". Over time, through word evolution, it evolved to describe the person who drove the cart to move goods. The word cairt is still used in Gaelic. The Celtic word cairt has its origins in the Proto-Indo-European word "kars" or "kart", which referred to a wheeled vehicle. The surname, depending on origin may also have derivation from "cairtear," a Gaelic term for tourist or sojourner.

In England, the earliest recorded use of the surname Carter dates back to 1192–1193, as evidenced by the entry of Norman knight Rannulf le Caretier in the Pipe Rolls of Huntingdonshire. This record appears during the reign of King Richard I, also known as Richard the Lionheart who ruled from 1189 to 1199. Close to a century later, on the Hundred Rolls of 1273, a census of Wales and England, includes six early bearers of the surname: Jocius Catetarius in Oxfordshire, Juliana le Cartere in Cambridgeshire, Nicholas le Carter in Oxfordshire, John le Cartere in Norfolk, Robert le Caretter in Huntingdonshire, and Margaret le Careter in Huntingdonshire. The Poll Tax of Yorkshire from 1379 lists Richardus Carter as another bearer of the surname in an Anglicized form.

Following the Norman invasion of Ireland in the 1100s, Roman Catholic English-derived Carters also arrived in Ireland and settled into walled towns established by the Normans. These Anglo-Normans assimilated into Irish culture, adopting Irish Gaelic customs, language, and religion, becoming what is referred to in Irish historiography as "more Irish than the Irish themselves." The later English and Scottish Protestant planter settlers in Ireland who arrived between the 1550s and 1700 and mainly settled in Ulster during the plantation of Ulster, established the Ulster Protestant community and remained a distinct class and group. The surname was also frequently used as a shortened, Anglicized form of the Irish surname McCarter, particularly by immigration clerks in the United States and Canada in the 19th century and early-20th century, or by families themselves aiming to shorten the name by dropping the "Mc."

The Statutes of Kilkenny in 1366, which aimed to curb the decline of the Hiberno-Norman Lordship of Ireland, established that every Englishman or Irish living amongst the English use the English language and adopt English naming and customs or be thrown in jail and lose property. It was declared for those Irish living in The Pale, to take an English surname either after a town, colour, trade, or office, which also contributed to the proliferation of Anglo and Anglicized surnames.

Today, Carter is the 44th most common surname in the United States and 56th most common in England. In Ireland it is ranked between McGarry and Cannon where it is found with greatest frequency in County Laois as the 70th most common surname and also has significant presence in Dublin, Cork, and Limerick. In Scotland it is found with greatest frequency in the Outer Hebrides.

The Carter surname is common among African Americans as formerly enslaved people lost their family names long before the Emancipation and 13th Amendment to their masters (who were typically of English or Scottish descent), or through the common mixing found between Irish immigrants and free African Americans in Northern cities and communities such as Five Points and Seneca Village in New York City and elsewhere in the United States, such as New Orleans. This name is common among African Americans capable of tracing their roots back to the southern United States or Caribbean from the early 20th century and prior, with some 35% of name holders of Carter in the United States being of African American descent and it being the 22nd most common surname for Black Americans.

== People with the surname ==
=== A ===
- A. P. Carter (1891–1960), American country music musician, founder of the Carter Family musical group
- Aaron Carter (1987–2022), American musician
- Abdul Carter (born 2004), American football player
- Ad Carter (1895–1957), American comic strip cartoonist
- Adam Carter (footballer) (born 1994), Australian rules footballer from Western Australia
- Adrian Carter (born 1959), British architect
- Aimee Carter (born 1986), American writer
- Al Carter, (born 1952), American journalist
- Alan Carter (disambiguation), multiple people
- Albert Carter (disambiguation), multiple people
- Alex Carter (disambiguation), multiple people
- Alfred Williams Carter (1894–1986), Canadian flying ace
- Ali Carter (born 1979), English professional snooker player
- Allen 'Big Al' Carter (1947–2008), American artist
- Ally Carter (born 1974), American author
- Amanda Carter (born 1964), Australian Paralympic basketball player
- Amon G. Carter (1879–1955), publisher of the newspaper Fort Worth Star-Telegram
- Amy Carter (born 1967), youngest child of former U.S. president Jimmy Carter and his wife, Rosalynn
- Amy Carter (politician), American politician
- Andre Carter (born 1979), American football player
- Andre Carter II (born 2000), American football player
- Andrew Carter (disambiguation), multiple people
- Angela Carter (1940–1992), English novelist and journalist
- Anita Carter (1933–1999), American singer-songwriter
- Ann Carter (1936–2014), American actress
- Ann Carter (rioter) (died 1629), English activist
- Anne Hill Carter Lee, (1773–1829), American, mother of Confederate General Robert E. Lee
- Anson Carter (born 1974), Canadian professional ice hockey player
- Anthony Carter (disambiguation), multiple people
- April Carter, British academic and political activist
- Arion Carter (born 2004), American football player
- Arnold Carter (1918–1989), American baseball player
- Asa Earl Carter (1925–1979), American speechwriter; novelist under the pseudonym Forrest Carter
- Ash Carter (1954–2022), American physicist, Harvard University professor, and US Secretary of Defense
- Ashley Carter (born 1995), English footballer

=== B ===
- Barrett Carter (born 2002), American football player
- Barry White (born Barry Eugene Carter, 1944–2003), American soul and disco singer
- Ben Carter (actor) (1910–1946), American actor and casting agent
- Ben Carter (basketball) (born 1994), American-Israeli basketball player in the Israel Basketball Premier League
- Benny Carter (1907–2003), American jazz musician
- Benny Carter (painter) (1943–2014), American folk artist
- Bernard Carter (banker) (1893–1961), American soldier and banker
- Betty Carter (1929–1998), American jazz singer
- Bill Carter (born 1966), American writer and documentary director
- Billy Carter (1937–1988), American younger brother of U.S. president Jimmy Carter
- Billy Carter (ice hockey) (1937–2024), Canadian ice hockey player
- Blue Ivy Carter (born 2012), daughter of Beyoncé and Jay-Z
- Bo Carter (1893–1964), American blues musician
- Bob Carter (cricketer, born 1937), English cricketer for Worcestershire
- Bob Carter (musician) (1922–1993), American jazz bassist and arranger
- Bobby Carter (1939–2015), American politician in Tennessee
- Boo Carter (born 2005), American football player
- Brandon Carter (American football) (born 1986), American footballer and wrestler known as TAC
- Brandon Carter (born 1942), Australian theoretical physicist noted for work on the properties of black holes
- Brett Carter (politician) (born 1972), American politician
- Brett Carter (rugby league) (born 1989), British rugby league footballer
- Bruce Carter (disambiguation), multiple people
- Buddy Carter (born 1957), American Congressman from Georgia
- Bunchy Carter (1942–1969), American activist in the Black Panther Party

=== C ===
- Carl Carter (1964–2019), American footballer
- Carlene Carter (born 1955), American country singer-songwriter
- Carol Ann Carter, American artist
- Cedric Carter (1917–1984), British clinical geneticist
- Cethan Carter (born 1995), American football player
- Chance Carter (born 2001), Canadian soccer player
- Charles Carter (disambiguation), multiple people
- Chennedy Carter (born 1998), American basketball player
- Chesley William Carter (1902–1994), Canadian Member of Parliament and senator
- Chris Carter (disambiguation), multiple people
- Clarence Carter (1936–2026), American singer, songwriter, musician and record producer
- Clarence H. Carter (Wisconsin politician) (1874–1958), member of the Wisconsin State Assembly
- Clarence Holbrook Carter (1904–2000), American painter
- Claude Carter (1881–1952), South African cricketer
- Clifford Carter (born 1952), American keyboardist
- Clive Carter, British actor and singer
- Colin Carter, Canadian economist
- Cris Carter (born 1965), American football wide receiver
- Curtis L. Carter (born 19??), American? academic
- Cynthia Carter (born 1959), British academic, writer and feminist

=== D ===
- Dale Carter (born 1969), American football cornerback
- Dan Carter (born 1982), New Zealand rugby player
- Daniel Carter (disambiguation), multiple people, several other people
- Danielle Carter (actress), Australian actress
- Danielle Carter (footballer) (born 1993), English footballer
- Darrell Carter (born 1967), English cricketer
- Darren Carter (born 1983), English football player
- Darren Carter (comedian), American actor and stand-up comedian
- Darren Carter (rugby league) (born 1972), British rugby league footballer
- Daryl Carter (born 1975), American football linebacker
- Dave Carter (1952–2002), American folk singer and songwriter
- David Carter (disambiguation), multiple people
- Davy Carter (born 1975), American politician in Arkansas
- Dean Carter (born 1955), American convicted spree-killer
- Dean Vincent Carter (born 1976), English horror and fantasy fiction author
- Deana Carter (born 1966), American singer-songwriter of country music
- Deborah Carter (born 1972), American basketball player
- Dedric Carter, American academic administrator and researcher
- Dennis Malone Carter (18??–1881), Irish-born American artist who painted portraits and historical settings
- DeQuece Carter (born 2001), American football player
- Derrick Carter (born 1969), American house producer and DJ
- Derrick Carter (footballer) (born 1982), Guyanese international footballer
- Desmond Carter (1895–1939), British lyricist
- Desmond Keith Carter (1967–2002), American who was executed in North Carolina for a 1992 murder
- Devin Carter (born 2002), American basketball player
- DeWayne Carter (born 2000), American football player
- Dexter Carter (born 1967), American football running back
- Dick Carter (1916–1969), American baseball player and manager
- Dixie Carter (1939–2010), American actress
- Dixie Carter (wrestling) (born 1964), American wrestling promoter
- Dominic Carter (journalist), American news reporter and political commentator
- Don Carter (disambiguation), multiple people
- Donna Carter (c. 1944 – 2018), Trinidadian politician and diplomat
- Doris Carter (1912–1999), Australian high jumper and discus thrower
- Dorothy Carter (1935–2003), American musician
- Douglas Carter (1908–1988), New Zealand politician
- Douglas F. Carter, Canadian-born Californian politician
- Duane Carter (1913–1993), American racecar driver in the Indianapolis 500
- Dudley C. Carter (1891–1991), Canadian-American woodcarver
- Duncan Carter-Campbell of Possil (1911–1990), Scottish Soldier
- Dwayne Michael Carter Jr. (born 1982), rapper known as "Lil Wayne"

=== E ===
- E. Finley Carter, director/president of SRI International from 1956 to 1963
- Earl Carter (disambiguation), multiple people
- Edith Carter (fl. 1920s and 1930s), English actress and playwright
- Edmund Carter (cricketer, born 1785) (1785–?), English cricketer
- Edmund Carter (cricketer, born 1845) (1845–1923), English cricketer
- Edward Carter (disambiguation), multiple people
- Edwin Carter (c. 1830 – 1900), American naturalist
- Edwin Carter (pseudonym) (1962–2006), pseudonym of British-Russian defector and former officer of the Russian FSB Alexander Litvinenko
- Elizabeth Carter (1717–1806), English poet, classicist, writer and translator
- Ellen Carter (1762–1815), English artist and illustrator
- Elliott Carter (1908–2012), American classical music composer
- Elmer A. Carter (1890–1973), American writer, editor and civil rights activist
- Eric Carter (BMX rider) (born 1970), American BMX racer
- Eric Carter (Canadian football) (born 1969), American football player
- Ernest Carter (drummer) (born 1952), American drummer
- Ernest Trow Carter (1866–1953), American organist and composer
- Ethan Carter III (born 1983), ring name of American professional wrestler Michael Hutter
- Evan Carter (born 2002), American baseball player

=== F ===
- Finn Carter (born 1960), American actress
- Forrest Carter, pseudonym of Asa Earl Carter
- Frances Ann Tasker Carter (1738–1787), wife of Robert Carter, wealthy Virginia plantation owner
- Francis Carter (priest) (1851–1935), British Anglican priest
- Francis John Carter (1869–1949), New Zealand sawmiller
- Frank Carter (disambiguation), multiple people
- Fred Carter (disambiguation), multiple people
- Freddy Carter (born 1993), English actor

=== G ===
- G. R. Carter (born 1968), American Quarter Horse Jockey
- G. S. Carter (1910–1988), New Zealand surveyor and road engineer
- Gaius Carter (born 1998), American archer
- Gary Carter (1954–2012), American professional baseball player
- Geoff Carter (1943–2018), English footballer
- George Carter (disambiguation), multiple people
- Gerald Carter (born 1957), American football wide receiver
- Gerald Emmett Carter (1912–2003), Cardinal Archbishop of Toronto
- Glenn Carter (born 1964), English stage actor and singer–songwriter
- Gloria Carter Spann (1926–1990), motorcyclist and sister of Jimmy Carter
- Granville Carter, (1920–1992) American sculptor. Nicknamed "Dany Carter"
- Graydon Carter (born 1949), Canadian-born American journalist
- Greg Carter (disambiguation), multiple people

=== H ===
- H. Adams Carter (1914–1995), American linguist, mountaineer and editor of the American Alpine Journal
- H. E. Carter (1910–2007), American biochemist
- Hamish Carter (born 1971), New Zealand triathlete
- Harold Carter (disambiguation), multiple people
- Harry Carter (disambiguation), multiple people
- Hazel Carter (writer) (1894–1918), American who stowed away on a ship to France during WWI to be with her husband
- Helen Carter (1927–1998), American country singer
- Helena Bonham Carter (born 1966), British actress
- Helena Carter (1923–2000), American actress
- Henry Carter (disambiguation), multiple people
- Herbert Carter (disambiguation), multiple people
- Hodding Carter (1907–1972), American journalist and author
- Hodding Carter III (1935–2023), American journalist and politician
- Howard Carter (disambiguation), multiple people
- Howie Carter (1904–1991), American baseball player John Howard Carter
- Hugh Carter (1920–1999), American politician
- Hykeem Carter (born 2000), American rapper known as "Baby Keem"

=== I ===
- Ian Carter (born 1967), British-born Canadian soccer player

=== J ===
- J. P. Carter (1915–2000), American military officer and politician
- Ja'Tyre Carter (born 1999), American football player
- Jack Carter (disambiguation), multiple people
- Jahmeer Carter (born 2001), American football player
- Jalen Carter (born 2001), American football player
- Jamal Carter (born 1994), American football player
- James Carter (disambiguation), multiple people
- Janette Carter (1923–2006), American musician
- Janis Carter (1913–1994), American actress
- Jared Carter (Latter Day Saints) (1801–1849), American religious leader
- Jared Carter (poet) (born 1939), American poet
- Jason Carter (disambiguation), multiple people
- Javier Carter (born 1991), Panamanian basketball player
- Jeff Carter (disambiguation), multiple people
- Jenny Carter (born 1931), Canadian politician, former cabinet minister
- Jermaine Carter (born 1995), American football player
- Jerome Carter (athlete) (born 1963), American high jumper, former co-American record holder, 1988
- Jerome Carter (born 1982), American football safety
- Jess Carter (born 1997), British footballer
- Jesse F. Carter (1873–1943), American associate justice of the South Carolina Supreme Court
- Jesse W. Carter (1888–1959), American associate justice of the California Supreme Court
- Jessika Carter (born 1999), American basketball player
- Jevon Carter (born 1995), American basketball player
- Jill Carter-Hansen (née Carter, born 1941), New Zealand-born illustrator, author and filmmaker
- Jill P. Carter (born 1964), American politician in Maryland
- Jim Carter – see James Carter (disambiguation), multiple people
- Jimmy Carter (1924–2024), 39th president of the United States from 1977 to 1981
- Joan Carter (born 1943), American businesswoman and philanthropist
- Joanne Carter (born 1980), Australian figure skating Olympian
- Joe Carter – see Joseph Carter (disambiguation), multiple people
- John Carter (disambiguation), multiple people, including people named Johnny Carter
- Jon Carter (American football) (born 1965), American football defensive lineman
- Jon Carter (born 1970), English DJ and businessman
- Jonathan Carter (disambiguation), multiple people
- Jordan Carter (born 1996), American rapper known as "Playboi Carti"
- Joseph Carter (disambiguation), multiple people
- Josiah Carter (1813–1868), American politician
- June Carter (1929–2003), American country singer, wife of Johnny Cash
- Justin Carter (born 1987), American basketball player

=== K ===
- Kahurangi Carter, New Zealand politician
- Kayli Carter, American actress
- Keith Carter (disambiguation), multiple people
- Kenneth Carter (disambiguation), multiple people, also includes people named Ken or Kenny Carter
- Kent Carter (born 1939), American jazz bassist
- Kent Carter (gridiron football) (born 1950), American football player
- Kerry Carter (born 1980), Trinidadian-born gridiron football fullback
- Kevin Carter (1961–1994), South African photojournalist
- Kevin Carter (American football) (born 1973), American National Football League player
- Kid Carter (fl. 1903–1906), American baseball player
- Kim Carter, Canadian public servant
- Kristopher Carter (born 1972), American composer
- Kyle Carter (born 1992), American football tight end
- Kym Carter (born 1964), American heptathlete

=== L ===
- Lance Carter (baseball) (born 1974), American baseball player
- Lance Carter (musician) (1955–2006), American jazz drummer
- Landon Carter (1710–1778), Virginia planter
- Larry Carter (born 1965), American baseball player
- Laura Carter (actress) (born 1985), English actress and model
- Laura Carter (musician), American multi-instrumentalist musician
- Lee Carter (born 1971), better known as Viper, American rapper
- Lee Carter (comics), 21st century British concept and comics artist
- Les Carter (born 1958), better known as Fruitbat, English musician
- Les Carter (footballer) (born 1960), English footballer
- Leslie Carter (1986–2012), American pop singer
- Lillian Gordy Carter (1898–1983), known as "Miss Lillian", mother of former U.S. president Jimmy Carter
- Lin Carter (1930–1988), American science fiction/fantasy author and editor
- Linda Carter (disambiguation), multiple people
- Lorenzo Carter (1767–1814), early American community leader
- Lorenzo Carter (American football) (born 1995), American football player
- Louis Carter (1953–2020), American football running back
- Lyle Carter (born 1945), Canadian ice hockey and softball player
- Lynda Carter (born 1951), American television actress and singer of cabarets
- Lynn Carter, American planetary scientist
- Mrs. Leslie Carter (1862–1937), American actress

=== M ===
- Iris Kyle (born Mildred Carter; 1974), American professional bodybuilder
- Mandy Carter (activist) (born 1948), American LGBT activist
- Mark Carter (footballer) (born 1960), English footballer
- Mark Carter (rugby) (born 1968), New Zealand rugby union and rugby league footballer
- Martin Carter (1927–1997), Guyanese poet
- Marty Carter (born 1969), American football safety
- Mary Kennedy Carter (1934–2010), American social studies teacher and civil rights activist
- Matt Carter (disambiguation), multiple people
- Maurice Carter (basketball) (born 1976), American former professional basketball player
- Maurice Carter (film designer) (1913–2000), British film production designer
- Maurice Carter (racing driver), Canadian racer
- Maybelle Carter (1909–1978), American country music musician
- Megan Carter (born 2001), Canadian ice hockey player
- Mel Carter (born 1939), American singer and actor
- Melvin Carter (disambiguation), multiple people
- Merri Sue Carter (born 1964), American astronomer
- Michael Carter (disambiguation), multiple people
- Michelle Carter (athlete) (born 1985), American shot putter
- Ming Veevers-Carter, English florist
- Murray Carter, (born 1931) Australian racing driver

=== N ===
- Nate Carter (born 2002), American football player
- Nathan Carter (born 1990), Irish country singer
- Neal Carter (mountaineer) (1902–1978), Canadian mountaineer
- Neil Carter (disambiguation), multiple people
- Nell Carter (1948–2003), American singer and actress
- Nelson Victor Carter (1887–1916), English recipient of the Victoria Cross
- Nick Carter (disambiguation), multiple people
- Nigel Carter (born 1947), English environmentalist and politician
- Nina Carter (born 1952), British model
- Norah Carter (1881–1966), New Zealand photographer

=== O ===
- Oliver Jesse Carter (1911–1976), American federal judge
- Orrin N. Carter (1854–1928), American state judge

=== P ===
- Pamela Carter (Indiana politician) (born 1949), American lawyer; Indiana Attorney General (1993–97)
- Pat Carter (born 1966), American football tight end
- Patrick Carter (disambiguation), multiple people
- Paul Carter (disambiguation), multiple people
- Paula Carter (1940–2001), American politician from Missouri
- Perry Carter (born 1971), American football defensive back
- Peter Carter (disambiguation), multiple people
- Philip Carter (1927–2015), Scottish-born football director
- Phillip Carter (disambiguation), multiple people
- Pip Carter, English actor

=== Q ===
- Quincy Carter (born 1977), American professional football player

=== R ===
- Raich Carter (1913–1994), English footballer and cricketer
- Ralph Carter (born 1961), American actor
- Raymond Carter (disambiguation), multiple people
- Reggie Carter (1957–1999), American baseball player
- Regina Carter (born 1966), American jazz violinist
- Reginald Carter (disambiguation), multiple people
- Rich Carter (born 1971), American chemistry professor
- Richard Carter (disambiguation), multiple people
- Rick Carter (born 1952), American production designer and art director
- Rob Carter (born 1949), American professor of typographer and graphic design
- Robert Carter (disambiguation), multiple people, includes people named Bob Carter
- Robert H. Carter III (1847–1908), American pharmacist
- Rod Carter (born 1954), Australian rules football from Victoria
- Rodney Carter (born 1964), American football running back
- Roger Carter (disambiguation), multiple people
- Ron Carter (disambiguation), multiple people
- Ron'Dell Carter (born 1997), American football player
- Ronan Carter (born 1996), English actor
- Rosalynn Carter (1927–2023), First Lady of the United States, wife of Jimmy Carter
- Ross Carter (1914–2002), American footballer
- Roy Carter (disambiguation), multiple people
- Rubin Carter (1937–2014), American-Canadian boxer wrongfully convicted of murder
- Rubin Carter (American football) (born 1952), American football defensive tackle
- Russell Carter (American football) (born 1962), American footballer
- Russell Carter (basketball) (born 1985), American basketball player
- Russell Gordon Carter (1892–1957), American author
- Ruth E. Carter, American costume designer
- Ryan Carter (born 1983), American ice hockey player

=== S ===
- Sam Carter (disambiguation), multiple people
- Sammy Carter (1878–1948), English-born Australian cricketer
- Samuel Carter (disambiguation), multiple people
- Sara Carter (1898–1979), American country music musician
- Sarah Carter (born 1980), Canadian actress
- Sarah Ewing Sims Carter (1826–1912), American socialite, slave owner, and Confederate spy
- Scott Carter (Australia rugby league), Australian rugby league footballer who played in the 1980s and 1990s
- Scott Carter (sports administrator), New Zealand sports administrator
- Sha Carter (born 2000), American basketball player
- Shawn Carter (born 1969), American rapper better known as Jay-Z
- Shayne Carter (born 1964), New Zealand rock singer
- Shonie Carter (born 1972), American mixed martial artist
- Shy Carter (born 1984), American songwriter, record producer and singer
- Sol Carter (1908–2006), American baseball pitcher
- Sonny Carter (1947–1991), American physician, astronaut, naval officer and professional soccer player
- Stacy Carter (born 1970), known as Miss Kitty or The Kat, American professional wrestler
- Stephen Carter (disambiguation), multiple people
- Steve Carter (disambiguation), multiple people, includes people named Steven Carter
- Stuart Carter (disambiguation), multiple people
- Sue Carter (born 1956), Australian politician
- Sydney Carter (1915–2004), English poet and songwriter: "Lord of the Dance"

=== T ===
- T. J. Carter (disambiguation), multiple people
- T. K. Carter (1956–2026), American actor
- Tara Carter, Anguillan politician
- Terry Carter (1928–2024), American actor and filmmaker
- Thomas Carter (disambiguation), multiple people
- Tim Carter (disambiguation), multiple people
- Timothy Carter (disambiguation), multiple people
- Toby Carter (1910–1988), New Zealand surveyor and road engineer
- Todd Carter (born 1986), American football placekicker
- Tom Carter (disambiguation), multiple people
- Tony Carter (disambiguation), multiple people
- Tory Carter (born 1999), American football player
- Troy Carter (disambiguation), multiple people
- Tyler Carter (alpine skier) (born 1994), American para-alpine skier
- Tyler Carter (born 1991), American singer-songwriter
- Tyron Carter (born 1985), French singer and rapper
- Tyrone Carter (born 1976), American football defensive back
- Tyrone Carter (politician) (born 1962), American politician in Michigan

=== V ===
- Valerie Carter (1952–2017), American singer-songwriter
- Vednita Carter, 21st century American anti-prostitution activist and author
- Vince Carter (born 1977), American professional basketball player
- Vincent Carter (1891–1972), American congressman from Wyoming
- Virgil Carter (born 1945), American football quarterback
- Virginia Carter (1936–2024), Canadian physicist and entertainment executive
- Vivian Carter (1921–1989), American record company executive and radio dj
- Vivien Carter, Australian actress, singer and dancer

=== W ===
- Wally Carter (1909–2001), Australian rules football player and coach from Victoria
- Wally Carter (footballer, born 1898) (1898–1970), Australian rules footballer from Victoria
- Walter C. Carter (1929–2002), Canadian Member of Parliament
- Walter E. Carter Jr., American vice admiral
- Walter P. Carter (1923–1971), American civil rights activist in Baltimore
- Wendell Carter Jr., American basketball player for the Orlando Magic
- Wil Carter (born 1988), American basketball player
- Wilf Carter (footballer) (1933–2013), English footballer
- Wilf Carter (musician) (1904–1996), Canadian musician
- Wilfred Carter (1896–1975), English cricketer and footballer
- William Carter (disambiguation), multiple people
- Willoughby Harcourt Carter (1822–1900), first appointed Chief Constable of Buckinghamshire
- Wilson Carter, Scottish footballer in the 1960s
- Winifred Carter (c. 1883 – 1949), English author and playwright

=== X ===
- Xavier Carter (born December 1985), American athlete

=== Y ===
- Yannick Carter (born 1984), Canadian football linebacker
- Yvonne Carter (1959–2009), British doctor and Dean of Warwick Medical School

=== Z ===
- Zachary Carter (born 1999), American football player
- Zilford Carter (1899–1963), lawyer and state legislator in Indiana

== People with the given name ==
- Carter Baumler (born 2002), American baseball player
- Carter Bear (born 2006), Canadian ice hockey player
- Carter Beauford (born 1957), American drummer and founding member of the Dave Matthews Band
- Carter Blackburn (born 1979), American sportscaster
- Carter Bradley (born 2000), American football player
- Carter Braxton (1736–1797), American signer of the Declaration of Independence, representative of Virginia
- Carter Moore Braxton (1836–1896), American civil engineer, businessman, and soldier
- Carter Burwell (born 1955), American composer of film soundtracks
- Carter Camp (1941–2013), American Indian Movement activist who played a leading role in the 1972 Trail of Broken Treaties.
- Carter Camper (born 1988), American ice hockey player
- Carter Coughlin (born 1997), American football player
- Carter Eckert (1945–2024), American historian
- Carter Glass (1858–1946), American politician from Virginia
- Carter Bassett Harrison (c. 1756 – 1808), American politician from Virginia, brother of U.S. president William Henry Harrison
- Carter Harrison III (1825–1893), assassinated mayor of Chicago
- Carter Harrison IV (1860–1953), mayor of Chicago
- Carter Hart (born 1998), Canadian ice hockey goaltender
- Carter Jenkins (born 1991), American actor, starred in Surface
- Carter Jensen (born 2003), American baseball player
- Carter B. Magruder (1900–1988), United States Army general
- Carter Meadows (born 2007), American football player
- Carter Nelson (born 2005), American football player
- Carter O'Donnell (born 1998), American football player
- Carter Page (born 1971), American petroleum industry consultant and a former foreign-policy adviser to Donald Trump
- Carter Revard (1931–2022), American writer and poet
- Carter Rubin (born 2005), American singer
- Carter Sickels (born 1970s), American author and educator
- Carter Stanley (1925–1966), American bluegrass musician; one of The Stanley Brothers
- Carter Verhaeghe (born 1995), Canadian ice hockey player
- Carter Warren (born 1999), American football player
- Carter G. Woodson (1875–1950), American historian, author, journalist, founder of Black History Month
- Carter J. Ludwig (Born 2007), Co-Founder of The Grooks Inc.

== Fictional characters ==
=== Given name ===
- Carter (Teenage Mutant Ninja Turtles), a character from the Teenage Mutant Ninja Turtles
- Carter Grayson, in the Power Rangers: Lightspeed Rescue TV series
- Carter Kane, in The Kane Chronicles trilogy
- Carter Pewterschmidt, father of Lois Griffin in the animated TV series Family Guy

=== Surname ===
- Adam Carter, in the Spooks TV series
- Alan Carter (Space: 1999), in the Space: 1999 TV series
- Chick Carter, title character of Chick Carter, Boy Detective, a radio program (1943–1945), and Chick Carter, Detective, a 1946 Columbia film serial
- Daisy Carter, in the American soap opera The Young and the Restless
- Damon Carter, in the American drama series Soul Food
- Daniel Carter (comics), one of three characters with the identity of Supernova in the DC Comics Universe
- David Carter (character), protagonist of the animated miniseries Invasion America
- Doug Carter, in the British soap opera Hollyoaks
- Edison Carter, in the science fiction TV series Max Headroom
- Harley Carter, protagonist of the Canadian TV series Carter
- Heston Carter, in the British soap opera Doctors
- Jack Carter (Eureka), sheriff in the 2006 TV series Eureka
- Jacob Carter, in the science fiction TV series Stargate SG-1
- John Carter of Mars, in the Barsoom series of Edgar Rice Burroughs
- John Carter, medical doctor in the American TV series ER
- Johnny Carter (EastEnders), in the British soap opera EastEnders
- Linda Carter, in EastEnders
- Mandy Carter, in Ackley Bridge
- Mick Carter, in EastEnders
- Nancy Carter, in EastEnders
- Nick Carter (literary character), fictional detective who first appeared in American dime novels in the 1890s
- Peggy Carter, a Marvel Comics character
  - Peggy Carter (Marvel Cinematic Universe), the Marvel Cinematic Universe counterpart
- Randolph Carter, main character of many of H.P. Lovecraft's Dream-Cycle works
- Samantha Carter, a main character in the science-fiction TV series Stargate SG-1, daughter of Jacob Carter
- Sharon Carter, Marvel Comics character
  - Sharon Carter (Marvel Cinematic Universe), the Marvel Cinematic Universe counterpart
- Sheila Carter, in the American soap operas The Young and the Restless and The Bold and the Beautiful
- Shirley Carter, in EastEnders
- Stan Carter, in EastEnders
- Tina Carter, in EastEnders
- Zoe Carter, in the 2006 TV series Eureka
- Zsa Zsa Carter, in EastEnders

== See also ==
- Cartter, given name and surname
- General Carter (disambiguation)
- Judge Carter (disambiguation)
- Justice Carter (disambiguation)
- McCarter, surname
- Senator Carter (disambiguation)
