= Veevers =

Veevers may refer to:

- John Veevers (1930–2018), Australian geologist
- Ming Veevers-Carter, English florist
- Veevers crater, impact crater in Australia
- Veever's Falls, waterfall in Hamilton, Ontario, Canada
- Ken Veevers (1909–1973), former Australian rules footballer
