= General Carter =

General Carter may refer to:

- Jesse McI. Carter (1863–1930), U.S. Army major general
- John C. Carter (1837–1864), Confederate States Army brigadier general
- Joseph C. Carter (1970s–2010s), Massachusetts National Guard brigadier general
- Marshall Carter (1909–1993), U.S. Army lieutenant general
- Nick Carter (British Army officer) (born 1959), British Army general
- Samuel P. Carter (1819–1891), Union Army brevet major general
- Thomas L. Carter (fl. 1990s–2020s), U.S. Air Force major general
- William Harding Carter (1851–1925), U.S. Army major general

== See also ==
- George Carter-Campbell (1869–1921), British Army major general
- Attorney General Carter (disambiguation)
