= Joseph Carter =

Joseph or Joe Carter may refer to:

== Military ==
- Joseph Carter Abbott (1825–1881), Union general
- Joseph E. Carter (1875–1950), American Medal of Honor recipient
- Joseph F. Carter (1842–1922), American soldier and Medal of Honor recipient

== Music ==
- Joe Carter (guitarist) (1927–2001), slide guitarist
- Joseph Dougherty Carter (1927–2005), member of the Carter Family

== Politics ==
- Joseph Carter (socialist) (1910–1970), American socialist activist
- Joseph C. Carter (born 1956), first African-American National Guard Adjutant General in Massachusetts
- Joseph N. Carter (1843–1913), Chief Justice of the Supreme Court of Illinois
- Joseph O. Carter (1835–1909), Hawaiian politician

== Sports ==
- Joe Carter (born 1960), Major League Baseball player, 1983–1998
- Joe Carter (cricketer) (born 1992), New Zealand cricketer
- Joe Carter (end) (1909–1991), National Football League player, 1933–1945
- Joe Carter (footballer) (1899–1977), English football inside-forward
- Joe Carter (running back) (born 1962), National Football League player, 1984–1986

== Other ==
- Joseph Coleman Carter (born 1941), American historian
- Joseph Henry Carter (1857–1930), British veterinarian
- Joe Carter, pseudonym for Superman creator Jerry Siegel
- Joe Carter (Coronation Street), a character on the UK television series Coronation Street played by Jonathan Wrather
