= Hazel Carter =

Hazel Carter :

- Hazel Carter (writer) (1980), model and writer now living in the united kingdom. Full name Hazel patricia maria carter. Hazel is best well known for writing and entertainment journalist.
- Hazel Carter (linguist) (1999–2019), British-American linguist
