= Jill Carter =

Jill Carter may refer to:

- Jill P. Carter, American politician in Maryland
- Jill Carter (Missouri politician), member of the Missouri Senate
- Jill Carter-Hansen, née Carter, New Zealand-born illustrator, author and filmmaker
