= Lyndsey Olson =

American attorney and military veteran

City Attorney of Saint Paul
- In office February 5, 2018 – January 2026
- Appointed by: Melvin Carter
- Preceded by: Laura Pietan (acting)
- Succeeded by: Irene Kao

Personal details
- Education: Stephens College (BA); Mitchell Hamline School of Law (JD); The Judge Advocate General's Legal Center and School (LLM); United States Army War College (MSS)
- Awards: Bronze Star Medal; Legion of Merit

Military service
- Allegiance: United States
- Branch/service: United States Army
- Years of service: 2000–2024
- Rank: (COL)
- Unit: United States Army Judge Advocate General's Corps

Lyndsey Olson is an American attorney, military veteran, and executive. She served as City Attorney for the City of Saint Paul, Minnesota from February 2018 to January 2026, appointed by Mayor Melvin Carter. She is the second-longest-serving City Attorney in Saint Paul's history. A retired Colonel in the United States Army with 24 years of service, she is a veteran of Operation Iraqi Freedom and a recipient of the Bronze Star Medal. In 2026, she co-founded Grey Matter Strategic Partners, a strategic consulting firm based in Saint Paul.

== Early life and education ==
Olson earned a Bachelor of Arts in Philosophy, Law & Rhetoric from Stephens College in Columbia, Missouri, in 1998. She received her Juris Doctor in 2003 from Hamline University School of Law (now Mitchell Hamline School of Law) in Saint Paul, Minnesota, where she served as a Primary Editor of the Hamline Law Review.

In 2010, Olson received a Master of Laws (LL.M.) in Contract and Fiscal Law from the U.S. Army Judge Advocate General's Legal Center and School in Charlottesville, Virginia. Her LL.M. thesis was subsequently published in The Army Lawyer. She is a 2020 graduate of the U.S. Army War College, where she earned a Master of Strategic Studies (M.S.S.).

== Military career ==
Olson served in the United States Army Judge Advocate General's Corps for 24 years, retiring in 2024 at the rank of Colonel.

=== Operation Iraqi Freedom ===
Olson is a veteran of Operation Iraqi Freedom, where she served as Trial Counsel and International Law Officer at a Joint Base Brigade in Iraq from 2008 to 2009. She was awarded the Bronze Star Medal for her combat service.

=== Minnesota Army National Guard ===
Olson began her National Guard service as In-House Legal Aid Counsel from 2005 to 2008, where she established the Minnesota National Guard Legal Assistance Office, providing legal representation to servicemembers and their families on matters including rights under the Servicemembers' Civil Relief Act (SCRA), divorce, custody, and consumer law.

She served as Deputy General Counsel of the Minnesota Department of Military Affairs and Minnesota National Guard from 2010 to 2013, then as General Counsel from 2013 to 2018. She was the first woman to serve as General Counsel for the Minnesota National Guard and Department of Military Affairs. She later became the first female Staff Judge Advocate of the 34th Infantry Division. She was awarded the Legion of Merit upon her retirement in 2024.

=== Advocacy for servicemember protections ===
Olson led efforts in 2013 to update the Minnesota Code of Military Justice and advocated at both state and national levels for protections for victims of sexual assault in the reserve components. She co-authored the bipartisan National Guard and Reserve Access to Counsel Act, which was enacted as part of the National Defense Authorization Act for Fiscal Year 2015, guaranteeing eligible reserve-component servicemembers access to Special Victims' Counsel.

Olson was instrumental in the passage of the Minnesota Deployed Parents Custody and Visitation Act (2015), which provides custody and visitation protections for military parents during deployment.

In 2019, she was selected to co-lead the Minnesota National Guard's Sexual Assault Prevention and Response Board and co-authored the board's report, released in July 2020, on practices, policies, and training related to sexual assault prevention.

== Legal career ==
=== City Attorney for Saint Paul (2018–2026) ===
In 2018, Olson was appointed City Attorney for the City of Saint Paul by Mayor Melvin Carter, beginning her position on February 5, 2018. She served until January 2026, when she chose not to seek reappointment following the election of Mayor Kaohly Her.

As City Attorney, Olson served as Chief Legal Officer to the Mayor, the City Council, and 14 City Departments, overseeing a team of approximately 100 legal professionals across the Civil Litigation, Civil Transactional, and Criminal Divisions, as well as the Office of Neighborhood Safety and the Welcoming Saint Paul Immigrant and Refugee Program.

She also served as Lead Prosecutor for Saint Paul, with responsibility for approximately 11,000 criminal cases annually, supervising 21 prosecutors and four diversion programs.

==== George Floyd protests and charging decisions ====
Following the murder of George Floyd in Minneapolis on May 25, 2020, Saint Paul experienced widespread civil unrest. On June 12, 2020, Olson announced that the City Attorney's Office would dismiss cases against individuals who had engaged only in peaceful protest that did not involve acts of violence or threats to people or property, citing the interest of justice. The office was reviewing nearly 100 cases, 87 of which were curfew violations. The decision was noted as a contrast with the approach taken in neighboring Minneapolis, where hundreds of protesters still faced charges weeks later.
