= Edmund Carter =

Edmund Carter may refer to:

- Edmund Carter (cricketer, born 1845) (1845–1923), English cricketer for Oxford University, Victoria and Yorkshire, also rowed in The Boat Race
- Edmund Carter (cricketer, born 1785) (1785–?), English cricketer for the MCC and Hampshire
- Edmund Carter (topographer) (?–c. 1788), English surveyor, topographer and tutor
