= The Hand of the Devil =

2006 novel by Dean Vincent Carter

- First edition
- Author: Dean Vincent Carter
- Cover artist: Songe Riddle
- Language: English
- Genre: Fantasy horror novel
- Publisher: Bodley Head
- Publication date: 2 February 2006
- Publication place: United Kingdom
- Media type: Print (Paperback)
- Pages: 271 pp
- ISBN: 978-0-370-32883-6 (hardcover first edition)
- OCLC: 62265301

The Hand of the Devil is a 2006 fantasy horror novel written by Dean Vincent Carter aimed at young adults (grade 9 and above). It is centred on a young man named Ashley Reeves, a journalist for a science magazine Missing Link. He receives a letter from a Reginald G. Mather to see the only example of the Ganges Red mosquito on his island in the Lake District. Agreeing to his terms, Ashley travels to the island alone, and becomes stranded, and what was once a good story quickly transforms into a macabre nightmare.

== Characters ==
Ashley Reeves -Ashley is the protagonist throughout the story. He is in love with Gina.

Dr. Reginald Mathers - Mathers sent a letter to Ashley Reeves inviting him to his house. He, somehow, came into possession of the Red Ganges mosquito to study it.

Dr. Alexander Soames: He and Dr Mathers studied medicine together.

Gina - Gina works at the same magazine as Ashley.

== Review ==
A review in School Library Journal said that "Carter's novel contains a fair helping of gore, but never generates much tension or atmosphere", and that "none of the characters (with the possible exception of Mather) really emerges as an individual".
