= Henry Carter =

Henry Carter may refer to:

- Henry A. P. Carter (1837–1891), American diplomat in the Kingdom of Hawaii
- Henry Carter (1837–1901), English organist and composer, brother of William Carter
- Harry Carter Stuart (1893–1963), Virginia cattleman and state senator
- Henry H. Carter (linguist) (1905–2001), American linguistics professor
- Henry H. Carter (politician) (1903–1970), American politician in Kentucky
- Henry John Carter (1813–1895), surgeon, geologist and zoologist
- Henry L. Carter (1842–1913), American politician in the Virginia House of Delegates
- Henry Rose Carter (1852–1925), American physician, epidemiologist, and public health official
- Henry Stuart Carter (1910–1985), Virginia lawyer and state delegate
- Henry Vandyke Carter (1831–1897), English surgeon and anatomical artist
- Frank Leslie (1821–1880), born Henry Carter, English-American publisher and illustrator

== See also ==
- Harry Carter (disambiguation)
