= Samuel Carter =

Samuel Carter may refer to:

- Samuel Carter (Canadian politician) (1859–1944), Ontario manufacturer and political figure
- Samuel Carter (Coventry MP) (1805–1878), Railway solicitor and MP for Coventry
- Samuel Carter (Tavistock MP) (1814–1903), MP for Tavistock
- Samuel Casey Carter, American author and researcher
- Samuel John Carter (1835–1892), British artist
- Samuel P. Carter (1819–1891), United States military officer
- Samuel J. Carter, creator of Carter's Little Liver Pills

== See also ==
- Sam Carter (disambiguation)
