= Jeff Carter (disambiguation) =

Jeff Carter (born 1985) is an ice hockey player.

Jeff Carter may also refer to:

- Jeff Carter (photographer) (1928–2010), Australian
- Jeff Carter (pitcher) (born 1964), American baseball player
- Jeff Carter (bowler) (born 1969), American ten-pin bowler
- Donnel Jeffrey Carter (born 1950), a.k.a. Jeff Carter, the third son of former U.S. President Jimmy Carter

== See also ==
- Geoff Carter (1943–2018), English footballer
