= Roger Carter =

Roger Carter may refer to:

- Roger Carter (academic) (1922–2009), law professor and Dean, Faculty of Law, University of Saskatchewan
- Roger Carter (American football) (born 1999), American football player
- Roger Carter (darts player) (born 1961), American darts player
- Roger Carter (footballer) (born 1937), English footballer
- Roger Carter (Marxist-Leninist candidate), Canadian political candidate
- Roger Carter (mathematician) (1934–2022), British mathematician and author
- Roger Carter (racing driver) (born 1969), American race car driver
