= Cartier (surname) =

Cartier is a French and Walloon occupational surname of Norman origin meaning "someone who transports goods by cart." It was first recorded in the Duchy of Normandy around the year 1066. Notable people with the surname include:

- Albert Cartier (born 1960), French footballer
- Daniel Cartier (born 1969), American songwriter, singer and actor
- Edd Cartier (1914–2008), American magazine illustrator
- Emile de Cartier de Marchienne (1871–1946), Belgian diplomat
- Emmanuel Cartier, French criminal
- George Cartier (1869–1944), American football player
- George-Étienne Cartier (1814–1873), Canadian statesman and Father of Confederation
- Henri Cartier-Bresson (1908–2004), French photographer
- Jacques Cartier (1491–1557), French explorer
- Jacques Cartier (businessman) (1750–1814), Canadian entrepreneur and politician
- John Cartier (1733–1802), British colonial governor
- Patricia Cartier, French criminal
- Pierre Cartier (mathematician) (1932–2024), French mathematician
- Rudolph Cartier (1904–1994), Austrian television director
- Walter Cartier (1922–1995), American boxer turned actor
- Warren Antoine Cartier (1866–1936), American businessman

== Cartier brothers ==
Involved with Cartier (jeweler)

- Jacques Cartier (jeweler) (1884–1941), French jeweller
- Louis Cartier, French jeweller
- Pierre C. Cartier (1878–1964), French jeweller
