= Maldon grain riots =

17th-century riots

The Maldon grain riots took place in Maldon, England in March 1629, during a time of industrial depression and poor harvests. Starvation and high food prices in Essex increased the strain on the area's primarily agrarian economy. Due to a decline in the English cloth trade in January 1629, exports of grain increased with little left for domestic consumption. In March 1629, a group of 100-140 rioters led by one "Captain" Ann Carter, the wife of a butcher, boarded a Flemish grain ship and removed grain by filling their caps and gowns. The prominent involvement of women in the riot was attributed to the fact that it was common for a husband to be held legally accountable for the actions of his wife at the time.

The popular reaction to these changes in governmental organization and policy took the form of food riots.

After two weeks of attempting to prosecute the rioters, the local magistracy granted a lower purchase price of corn.

Carter toured the local area, after the riot, to raise local support from clothing workers. A further riot on May 22 attracted the attention of the Privy Council. A special commission was established, which led to Carter's execution as a threat to the social order.
