= Howard Carter (disambiguation) =

Howard Carter (1874–1939) was an English archaeologist who discovered Tutankhamun's tomb.

Howard Carter may also refer to:

- Howard Carter (basketball) (born 1961), American basketball player
- Howard Carter (businessman), founder of Incognito cosmetic brand
- Howard Carter (Australian preacher) (1936–1992), New Zealand-Australian religious leader
- Howard Carter (English preacher) (1891–1971), English-American Pentecostal Christian pioneer

== See also ==
- Howie Carter (1904–1991), American baseball player
