= Richard Carter =

Richard Carter or Rich Carter may refer to:

== Arts and entertainment ==
- Richard Carter (actor) (1953–2019), Australian actor
- Richard Carter (musician) (fl. 1728–1757), English violinist and composer

== Politics and government ==
- Richard Carter (MP for Cornwall) (1617–1668), MP for Cornwall
- Richard Henry Carter (1817–1880), Virginia planter, politician and Confederate officer during the American Civil War

== Science ==
- Richard Carter (histopathologist) (born 1934), British histopathologist
- Rich Carter (born 1971), American chemistry professor

== Sports ==
- Richard Carter (American football) (1919–2002), American football and basketball coach
- Richard Carter (cricketer) (1891–1969), English cricketer
- Dick Carter (1916–1969), American baseball pitcher, coach, and manager

== Other ==
- Richard Carter (land agent) (fl. 1846), English land agent and surveyor
- Richard Carter (Royal Navy officer) (died 1690), English officer in the Royal Navy
- Richard B. Carter (1877–1949), American ink manufacturer
- Samuel Christian (1939–2016), founder of the Philadelphia Black Mafia who also went by the name Richard Carter

== See also ==
- Rick Carter (born 1952), American production designer and art director
