= Cartter =

Cartter is both a surname and a given name. Notable people with the name include:

== Surname ==
- David Kellogg Cartter (1812–1887), American diplomat, federal judge and U.S. Representative from Ohio
- Harley High Cartter (1810–1874), American jurist

== Given name ==
- Thomas Cartter Lupton (1899–1977), American heir and businessman
- Zeboim Cartter Patten (1840–1925), American industrialist, capitalist and American Civil War captain

== See also ==
- Carter (name)
