= Fred Carter (disambiguation) =

Fred Carter (born 1945) is an American basketball player and coach.

Fred Carter may also refer to:

- Fred Carter (artist) (1938–2022), American artist
- Fred Carter (athlete) (1879–1941), British racewalker
- Fred Carter (convict) (1835–?), convict transported to Western Australia, later became a colony schoolteacher
- Fred Carter Jr. (1933–2010), American musician
- Fred Carter (rugby league), English rugby league footballer of the 1910s and 1920s
- Fred G. Carter (1888–?), American college football player and coach
- Frederic Carter (1853–1924), English cricketer
- Frederick Carter (1819–1900), Newfoundland lawyer and politician
- Freddy Carter (born 1993), English actor and director

== See also ==
- Charles Frederick Carter (1919–2002), British academic and Vice-Chancellor of Lancaster University
- Carter (disambiguation)
