= Senator Carter =

Senator Carter may refer to:

- Benjamin F. Carter (1824–1916), Wisconsin State Senate
- Bobby Carter (1939–2015), Tennessee State Senate
- Buddy Carter (born 1957), Georgia State Senate
- Cecil K. Carter Jr. (1929–1987), Louisiana State Senate
- Charles B. Carter (1880–1927), Maine State Senate
- Charles Newell Carter (born 1967), North Carolina State Senate
- Curry Carter (1892–1970), Virginia State Senate
- Galen A. Carter (1832–1893), Connecticut State Senate
- Heather Carter (fl. 2010s–2020s), Arizona State Senate
- Hugh Carter (1920–1999), Georgia State Senate
- Jason Carter (politician) (born 1975), Georgia State Senate
- Jesse W. Carter (1888–1959), California State Senate
- Jill P. Carter (born 1964), Maryland State Senate
- Jimmy Carter (1924–2024), Georgia State Senate
- John A. Carter (Virginia politician) (1808–1895), Virginia State Senate
- Margaret Carter (born 1935), Oregon State Senate
- Oliver Jesse Carter (1911–1976), California State Senate
- Raymond Carter (Missouri politician) (1905–1968), Missouri State Senate
- Stuart B. Carter (1907–1983), Virginia State Senate
- Thomas H. Carter (1854–1911), U.S. Senator from Montana
- Timothy J. Carter (1800–1838), Maine State Senate
- Troy Carter (politician) (born 1963), Louisiana State Senate
- William Blount Carter (1792–1848), Tennessee State Senate
- William Grayson Carter (died 1849), Kentucky State Senate
