= Steve Carter =

Steve or Steven Carter may refer to:

- Steve Carter (American football) (born 1962), American football player
- Steve Carter (baseball) (born 1964), American former Major League Baseball player
- Steve Carter (footballer, born 1953), English footballer who played for Notts County, Derby County, Torquay United and Minnesota Kicks
- Steve Carter (footballer, born 1972), English footballer who played for Scarborough
- Steve Carter (Indiana politician) (born 1954), Attorney General of Indiana, U.S.
- Steve Carter (Louisiana politician) (1943–2021), Louisiana State Representative
- Steve Carter (playwright) (1929–2020), American playwright
- Steve Carter (rugby league) (born 1970), Australian professional rugby league player
- Steven Carter (novelist), American author of short stories and novels
- Steven A. Carter (born 1958), American author of non-fiction and humor
- Steven V. Carter (1915–1959), U.S. Representative from Iowa

== See also ==
- Carter (name)
- Stephen Carter (disambiguation)
