= Raymond Carter =

Raymond or Ray Carter may refer to:

- Raymond Carter (British politician) (1935–2020), British Labour Party politician
- Raymond Carter (convict), convicted of murder but later released
- Raymond Carter (Missouri politician) (1905–1968), American politician
- Raymond Bonham Carter (1929–2004), British banker
- Raymond H. A. Carter (born 1955), Gendarmerie Nationale officer
- Ray Carter (basketball) (born 1972), British-American basketball player
- Ray Carter (cricketer) (1933–2012), English cricketer
- Ray Carter (footballer) (born 1951), English footballer
- Ray Carter, business writer associated with the 10 Cs model of supplier evaluation
