= Francis Carter =

Francis Carter may refer to:

- Francis Carter (priest) (1851–1935), Anglican priest
- Francis Carter (sawmiller) (1869–1949), New Zealand sawmiller
- Francis B. Carter (1861–1937), Justice of the Florida Supreme Court

== See also ==
- Frank Carter (disambiguation)
- Francis Lovett Carter-Cotton (1843–1919), Canadian newspaperman, politician, and businessman
