= Attorney General McCarter =

Attorney General McCarter may refer to:

- Robert H. McCarter (1859–1941), Attorney General of New Jersey
- Thomas N. McCarter (1867–1955), Attorney General of New Jersey

== See also ==
- Attorney General Carter (disambiguation)
