= Judge Carter =

Judge Carter may refer to:

== Canada ==
- George Ethelbert Carter (1921–2018), judge of the Ontario Court of Justice, first Canadian-born black judge
- Mary Carter (judge) (1923–2010), judge of the Court of Queen's Bench for Saskatchewan

== United States ==
- Andrew L. Carter Jr. (born 1969), judge of the United States District Court for the Southern District of New York
- David O. Carter (born 1944), judge of the United States District Court for the Central District of California
- Gene Carter (1935–2021), judge of the United States District Court for the District of Maine
- James Marshall Carter (1904–1979), judge of the United States Court of Appeals for the Ninth Circuit
- Oliver Jesse Carter (1911–1976), judge of the United States District Court for the Northern District of California
- Robert L. Carter (1917–2012), judge of the United States District Court for the Southern District of New York

== See also ==
- Justice Carter (disambiguation)
- Carter (surname)
