= Lynn Carter =

American planetary scientist

Lynn Marie Carter
- Education: Cornell University
- Scientific career
- Fields: Planetary science
- Institutions: University of Arizona
- Thesis: Investigating mantling deposits on Venus and regoliths on asteroids using radar polarimetry
- Doctoral advisor: Donald B. Campbell

Lynn Marie Carter is an American planetary scientist who works at the University of Arizona as a professor and associate department head in the Department of Planetary Sciences, and University Distinguished Scholar. Her research has concerned the surface structure of the planets and moons in the Solar System, and in particular the existence of ice on the Moon and Mars, as well as the surface effects of volcanos and asteroid impacts, and the use of remote sensing to study these phenomena.

== Education and career ==
Carter majored in astronomy and physics at the University of Illinois Urbana-Champaign, graduating magna cum laude in 1999. Her time as an undergraduate also included summer internships at the Cornell University and at the National Optical Astronomy Observatory in Tucson, Arizona. She continued her studies at Cornell University, receiving a master's degree in astronomy 2002 and completing her Ph.D. in 2005. Her doctoral dissertation, Investigating mantling deposits on Venus and regoliths on asteroids using radar polarimetry, was supervised by Donald B. Campbell.

She was a postdoctoral researcher at the Center for Earth and Planetary Studies in Washington, D.C. from 2004 to 2010, and then a research scientist at NASA's Goddard Space Flight Center from 2010 to 2016. In 2016 she returned to Tucson as an associate professor at the University of Arizona. She was promoted to full professor in 2025.

== Recognition ==
Carter was a 2019 recipient of the Presidential Early Career Award for Scientists and Engineers, given "for innovative radar polarimetry and remote sensing". She was named as a University Distinguished Scholar in 2021.
