= Troy Carter =

Troy Carter may refer to:

- Troy Carter (physicist), American plasma physicist
- Troy Carter (politician), American politician
- Troy Carter (talent manager), American music talent manager

== Fictional characters ==
- 2nd Lieutenant Troy Carter, character in Wing Commander (franchise), originated in 1990

== See also ==
- Carter (name)
