= David Carter =

David or Dave Carter may refer to:

== Arts and entertainment ==
- David A. Carter (born 1957), American author and illustrator of pop-up books
- David E. Carter (1942–2023), American businessman and writer
- Dave Carter (1952–2002), American folk singer, songwriter

=== Fictional characters ===
- Dave Carter (EastEnders), character on the British TV series EastEnders
- David Carter (character), protagonist of the 1998 American TV series Invasion America

== Politics and government ==
- David Carter (diplomat) (born 1945), British diplomat
- David Carter (politician) (born 1952), New Zealand politician
- David J. Carter (born 1934), politician, clergyman, photographer and author from Alberta, Canada
- David O. Carter (born 1944), United States District Court judge

== Sports ==
- David Carter (basketball) (born 1967), American college basketball coach
- David Carter (bridge), American bridge player
- David Carter (defensive lineman) (born 1987), American football defensive lineman
- David Carter (field hockey) (born 1981), Canadian field hockey player
- David Carter (golfer) (born 1972), English golfer
- David Carter (offensive lineman) (1953–2021), American football offensive lineman
- David Carter (tennis) (born 1956), Australian tennis player
- David Carter (rugby union) (born 1961), Australian rugby union player
- Dave Carter (powerlifter) (born 1947), British powerlifter

== Others ==
- David Carter (industrial designer) (1927–2020), British industrial designer and educator
- David Carter (surgeon) (born 1940), surgeon who was Chief Medical Officer for Scotland
