= James Carter =

James, Jim, or Jimmy Carter may refer to:

== Politics and law ==
- James Earl Carter Sr. (1894–1953), American businessman and politician; father of US president Jimmy Carter
- Jimmy Carter (1924–2024), 39th president of the United States from 1977 to 1981
- James G. Carter (1795–1849), American state legislator and education reformer
- James Carter (judge) (1805–1878), British jurist in Canada
- James P. T. Carter (1822–1869), American military officer and politician in Arizona Territory
- James C. Carter (1827–1905), American lawyer
- James Garneth Carter (1877–1949), American diplomat
- James Marshall Carter (1904–1979), United States federal judge
- J. P. Carter (James Pratt Carter, 1915–2000), American military officer and mayor of Madison, North Carolina
- James H. Carter (1935–2016), justice of the Iowa Supreme Court
- James Y. Carter, Illinois politician

== Sports ==
- James Carter (footballer) (fl. 1900), English footballer
- James Carter (coach) (1911–2012), American basketball coach
- Jimmy Carter (boxer) (1923–1994), American boxer
- Jim Carter (baseball) (1928–2000), American Negro league baseball player
- Jim Carter (American football) (1948–2023), American football player
- James Carter (swimmer) (born 1957), British swimmer
- Jim Carter (golfer) (born 1961), American golfer
- James Carter (basketball) (born 1964), Puerto Rican basketball player
- Jimmy Carter (footballer) (born 1965), English footballer
- James Carter (hurdler) (born 1978), American hurdler

== Arts and entertainment ==
- James Carter (engraver) (1798–1855), English engraver
- James A. Carter (1902–?), British art director
- James Carter (singer) (1925–2003), American singer for James Carter and the Prisoners
- Jimmy Carter (singer) (born 1932), American singer for The Blind Boys of Alabama
- Jim Carter (actor) (born 1948), English actor
- James Carter (musician) (born 1969), American jazz saxophonist and flautist
- James L. Carter, American film and television cinematographer
- James Carter, a character in the Rush Hour film series, portrayed by Chris Tucker

== Others ==
- Jim Carter (pseudoscientist), amateur physicist whose theories have been controversial

== Other uses ==
- USS Jimmy Carter, a US Navy submarine
