= Justice Carter =

Justice Carter may refer to:

- Ben Carter (Arkansas judge) (c. 1895–1943), associate justice of the Arkansas Supreme Court
- Edward F. Carter (1897–1981), associate justice of the Nebraska Supreme Court
- Francis B. Carter (1861–1937), associate justice of the Florida Supreme Court
- Gene Carter (1935–2021), associate justice of the Maine Supreme Judicial Court
- James H. Carter (1935–2016), associate justice of the Iowa Supreme Court
- Jesse F. Carter (1873–1943), associate justice of the South Carolina Supreme Court
- Jesse W. Carter (1888–1959), associate justice of the Supreme Court of California
- Joseph N. Carter (1843–1913), associate justice of the Illinois Supreme Court
- Orrin N. Carter (1854–1928), associate justice of the Illinois Supreme Court

== See also ==
- David Kellogg Cartter (1812–1887), chief justice of the Supreme Court of the District of Columbia
- Judge Carter (disambiguation)
- Carter (surname)
