= William Carter =

William Carter may refer to:

== Artists and entertainers ==
- William Carter (actor) (1902–1952), Australian silent film actor and company director
- William Carter (composer) (1838–1917), English composer, conductor, and organist
- William Carter (photographer) (1934–2025), American photographer
- Bill Carter (born 1966), American film director
- Bill Carter (musician), American singer, songwriter and musician
- William Harper Carter (born 1939), American businessman and former child actor

== Businessmen ==
- William Carter (ink maker) (died 1895), American founder of what became Carter's Ink Company
- William E. Carter (1875–1940), American businessman and RMS Titanic survivor
- William Leonard Carter (1877–1917), British businessman and army officer
- Billy Carter (1937–1988), American businessman and younger brother of American President Jimmy Carter

== Politicians ==
- William Blount Carter (1792–1848), American politician from Tennessee
- William Carter (Tasmanian politician) (1796–1878), first mayor of Hobart
- William Grayson Carter (died 1849), American politician from Kentucky
- William Carter (Wisconsin politician) (1833–1905), American politician from Wisconsin
- Sir William Carter (mayor of Windsor) (1848–1932), mayor of Windsor, England, 1908–1928
- William Carter (mayor of Philadelphia) (1651–1739), mayor of Philadelphia, 1710–1711
- William Carter (Mansfield MP) (1862–1932), British Labour Party member of parliament (MP) for Mansfield, 1918–1922
- William Henry Carter (1864–1955), United States representative from Massachusetts
- William Carter (St Pancras South West MP) (1867–1940), British Labour Party MP for St Pancras South West, 1929–1931
- William Arnold Carter (1907–1996), American governor of the Panama Canal Zone, 1960–1962
- William Fields Carter (1908–1999), American politician from Virginia
- William Lacy Carter (1925–2017), American politician and businessman
- William Carter (Queensland politician) (1899–1969), publican and member of the Queensland Legislative Assembly
- Hodding Carter III (William Hodding Carter III, 1935–2023), American journalist and politician, son of Hodding Carter II
- W. Beverly Carter Jr. (1921–1982), American ambassador
- William W. Carter, member of the Kansas House of Representatives

== Religious figures ==
- William Carter (bishop) (1850–1941), Anglican bishop in Africa
- William Carter (martyr) (c. 1548–1584), English printer and martyr

== Sportsmen ==
- William Carter (Kent cricketer) (1822–1847), English cricketer
- William Carter (Surrey cricketer) (1841–1888), English cricketer
- William Carter (catcher) (1889–?), American baseball player
- William Carter (third baseman), American baseball player
- Bill Carter (baseball), Negro league baseball player
- Billy Carter (ice hockey) (1937–2024), retired Canadian ice hockey forward

== Others ==
- William B. Carter (1820–1902), American farmer, Presbyterian minister, and mastermind of the East Tennessee bridge burnings of the American Civil War
- William Harding Carter (1851–1925), United States Army major general and Medal of Honor recipient
- Hodding Carter (William Hodding Carter II, 1907–1972), American journalist
- Will Carter (1912–2001), owner of the Rampant Lions Press and font designer
- William C. Carter, scholar of Marcel Proust
