= John S. Norman =

American politician

Member of the Kansas Senate from the 1st district
- In office January 12, 1925 – January 14, 1929

Member of the Kansas House of Representatives from the 1st district
- In office January 13, 1919 – January 8, 1923
- Preceded by: William W. Carter
- Succeeded by: Arthur Fenton

Personal details
- Party: Republican

John S. Norman was an American politician who was a member of the Kansas House of Representatives and Kansas State Senate during the early 20th century.

Norman worked as a banker and fruit grower in Troy, Kansas while in the legislature. He was originally elected to the State House in 1918, serving two terms from 1919 to 1923. He returned to the legislature upon his election to the State Senate in the 1924 election, serving one term there from 1925 to 1929.
