= Dean Vincent Carter =

English fiction author

- Born: 9 July 1976 (age 50); Bromsgrove, UK
- Occupation: Writer
- Writing career
- Genres: Fantasy, horror
- Website: deanvincentcarter.com

Dean Vincent Carter (born 9 July 1976) is an English horror and fantasy fiction author. His first published book was a fantasy horror novel entitled The Hand of the Devil, released in hardcover on 2 February 2006. On 29 March 2007, he published another fantasy horror, Hunting Season. In 2009 he released his third novel Blood Water.

As of September 2012 Carter was working on a fourth and fifth teenage fiction, as well as two adult fiction novels, one of which – Werewolves of London – is said to be a spiritual successor to Hunting Season and features crime, mystery, action, horror and espionage elements. The author is rumoured to have described it as 'a werewolf whodunnit seen through the eyes of John le Carré.' This was expected likely be published sometime around Christmas 2014 according to the author, but will initially be a Kindle-only book.

Dean revealed in August 2014 that he was a huge supporter of self-publishing and the 'new and exciting possibilities now available to authors via digital publishing.' As well as publishing three travel diaries on Amazon, he also hinted at several new works of fiction coming to Kindle (initially) with releases every month from September through December. One of these is very likely to be Werewolves of London, while the titles Four and Twenty and The Hammer have been teased via Facebook in 2014. He has a Jack the Ripper novel in the works, but there is 'no update at the moment except to say I'm still very excited about it and am taking my time to ensure it is as faithful to the accepted history of the case as possible'.
