= Edward Carter =

Edward Carter may refer to:

- Edward Carter (politician) (1822–1883), Canadian politician
- Edward A. Carter Jr. (1916–1963), U.S. Army Medal of Honor recipient for actions during World War II
- Edward Bonham Carter (born 1960), CEO of a British fund management group
- Edward Clark Carter (1878–1954), Institute of Pacific Relations
- Edward W. Carter (1911–1996), American businessman, philanthropist and art collector
- Edward Carter (priest) (died 1688), Church of England priest
- Edward Carter (of Blenheim) (1733–1793), Virginia planter, military officer and politician
- Ed Carter, character in the Charlie Higson novel The Dead

== See also ==
- Edward Carter Preston (1885–1965), English artist
