= Joseph Coleman Carter =

American historian

Joseph Coleman Carter (born 23 December 1941) is an American archaeologist, author, and academic specializing in Greek art and the study of ancient Greek colonies. He is the founder and director of the Institute of Classical Archaeology, a research unit associated with the University of Texas at Austin, and the non-profit Center for the Study of Ancient Territories.

== Education ==
He earned a BA in Classics from Amherst College in 1963. He completed his MA and PhD from Princeton University in 1967 and 1971 respectively. His doctoral thesis was on "Sculpture from the Necropolis of Taranto".

== Career ==
From 1971 to 2018, he was a professor of Classics at the University of Texas at Austin. He has held the Jacob and Frances Mossiker Chair in the Humanities and the Centennial Professorship in Archaeology at the University of Texas at Austin. He currently holds emeritus professor status.

He has completed excavations and surveys of the Greek colonial sites of Metaponto, in Southern Italy, and Chersonesos, in Ukraine. With the help of his efforts and financial support from the Packard Humanities Institute, Chersonesos was inscribed a UNESCO World Heritage site in 2013.

== Awards and scholarships ==
He is the winner of the James R. Wiseman book award.

== Selected publications ==
- The Chora of Metaponto (1998, University of Texas Press: ISBN 9780292712119)
- The Sculpture Of Taras (1976, Transactions of the American Philosophical Society: ISBN 9780871696571)
- Discovering the Greek Countryside at Metaponto (2006, University of Michigan: ISBN 9780472114771)
- The study of ancient territories : Chersonesos and Metaponto : 2004 annual report (2006, Institute of Classical Archeology: ISBN 9780974833415)
- The Necropoleis (1998, University of Texas Press: ISBN 9780292712119
- Crimean Chersonesos : city, chora, museum, and environs (2003, University of Texas Press: ISBN 9780970887924)
