= Bruce Carter =

Bruce Carter may refer to:

- Bruce Carter (American football) (born 1988), American football linebacker
- Bruce Carter (businessman) (born 1959), Australian businessman
- Bruce Carter (educator) (born 1939), Australian educator
- Bruce Carter (rower) (born 1943), British rower
- Bruce W. Carter (1950–1969), Vietnam War veteran and Medal of Honor recipient
- pseudonym for children's novels of Richard Hough, British writer
