= Allen 'Big Al' Carter =

American artist and public school art teacher (1947–2008)

Allen Dester Carter
- Born: June 29, 1947; Washington, D.C., U.S.
- Died: December 18, 2008 (aged 61)
- Education: Columbus College of Art and Design
- Known for: painting

Allen Dester Carter (June 29, 1947 – December 18, 2008), known as 'Big Al' Carter, was an Alexandria, Virginia artist and public school art teacher in Washington, D.C.

When profiled by The Washington Post Magazine in May 2006, Carter estimated that he had 20,000 works of art—"from intricate etchings to enormous day-glo paintings"—in the 900-square-foot space where he lived. Carter worked across all media, from large format photographs, to pen-and-ink drawings, to mono prints, etchings, paintings, murals and ceramics. He often incorporated found objects and other everyday materials—like popsicle sticks, buttons, and clothespins into his work. His work featured people he met fishing along the Potomac River, friends, and family members. Much of his work is whimsical with bold colors and lines, but he also addressed themes of poverty, racism, death and dying, religion and spirituality.

== Education ==
Carter received a Bachelor of Fine Arts degree from the Columbus College of Art and Design in Ohio in 1972, and returned to Washington to do post-graduate work and teach at American University. In 1995, he received an honorary Master of Fine Arts degree, also from the Columbus College of Art and Design.

== Exhibitions ==
During his life, Carter exhibited widely in galleries and museums - usually around the Mid Atlantic - including in exhibitions with major African American artists, including painter and collage artist Romare Bearden. He also exhibited at the Corcoran Gallery of Art and the Freer Gallery of Art, both in Washington, D.C; the Virginia Museum of Fine Arts in Richmond; the Southeastern Center for Contemporary Art in Winston-Salem, North Carolina; The Portsmouth Museum in Virginia; the Cameron Art Museum in Wilmington, NC; and the Alexandria Black History Museum in Alexandria, VA. Soon after his death, a retrospective of his works was staged at Vanderbilt University's Curb Center for Art, Enterprise and Public Policy. In 2015, 80 of his paintings, sculptures, drawings, and assemblages were exhibited at the Arizona State University Art Museum.

A more recent retrospective was held in 2019 at the Fred Schnider Gallery of Art in Arlington, VA.

Carter's artworks are in permanent collections at the Smithsonian Museum and the Corcoran Gallery of Art, both in Washington, DC. He also created public murals in Roanoke, VA; Washington, DC; Asheville, NC; Raleigh, NC; and Winston-Salem, NC. In 1992, Carter was selected to paint the official mural commemorating the 200th anniversary of the University of North Carolina at Chapel Hill.

== Awards ==
Carter was awarded the Kansas City key to the city, a Virginia Museum of Fine Arts Professional Fellowship, and a DC Commission on the Arts & Humanities Artist-In-Residence award.

== Critical acclaim ==
Carter's work attracted critical acclaim during his career, and yet he "did not allow his artwork to be shown in the country's art capital, New York, where he could have found greater renown and remuneration."

"Carter's art is protean, large-hearted, never prissy," Washington Post critic Paul Richard wrote of a 1985 exhibition at a local gallery. "Warmth pours from the walls. To walk into the gallery is to accept Big Al's embrace."

A 1990 New York Times review said his paintings "suggest boundless, uncontrollable freedom . . . [a] complex world of reality, dream and art."
