= Tom Carter =

Tom Carter may refer to:

- Tom Carter (American football) (born 1972), American football player
- Tom Carter (diplomat) (born 1953), British politician
- Tom Carter (golfer) (born 1968), American golfer
- Tom Carter (rugby union) (born 1983), centre for the New South Wales Waratahs
- Tom Carter (wrestler) (born 1974), American professional wrestler known by the stage name Reckless Youth

== See also ==
- Thomas Carter (disambiguation)
