= Patricia and Emmanuel Cartier =

French convicted murderers

Patricia and Emmanuel Cartier are a French husband and wife who in 2002 were convicted of deliberately injecting their five children with insulin, a crime which resulted in the death of one of their daughters. In 2005, they were sentenced by a court in Beauvais to 10 and 15 years in prison, respectively. At the time of their trial Patricia, a carer for the elderly, was 44, while her husband, a machine operator, was 37.

== Context of the crime ==
The Cartiers argued in court that they were driven to commit their crime out of desperation, caused by a €250 000 debt which they incurred on numerous credit cards and an assortment of consumer loans. They claimed that they had been caught up in a cycle of consumption, including on products for their children: each of the children had a television, two had personal computers, and three had hi-fis and games consoles. Emmanuel Cartier eventually spent entire nights juggling loans in a downward spiral of revolving credit.

== The crime ==
The edifice finally collapsed. The family went out for a meal at a local restaurant, and on returning home the parents told their children they were giving them vaccinations for a holiday abroad. Patricia Cartier then gave the five children insulin injections, before giving herself the same injection. Emmanuel Cartier attempted to slash his wrists. The children had been dressed in new clothes bought with the last of their money. Patricia Cartier said in court that this was so that they would be "nicely dressed when they reached the other side." The doses given were not fatal for four of the children or the mother, but 11-year-old Alicia later died from the injection in hospital. The four surviving children were initially cared for by their grandmother, but coincidentally she was killed in a road accident on the day Alicia died.

The Cartiers' lawyer said of the couple: "There are responsibilities, but it would be profoundly unjust if they were to bear them all."

== Impact ==
The French philosopher Bernard Stiegler wrote about the Cartiers in Mécréance et Discrédit: Tome 2, Les sociétés incontrolables d'individus désaffectés (2006). An extract was published in English translation as The Disaffected Individual.
