= Zilford Carter =

American lawyer and legislator

Zilford C. Carter

Member of the Indiana House of Representatives
- In office 1947–?

Personal details
- Born: November 21, 1899 Mexia, Texas, U.S.
- Died: April 21, 1963 (aged 63) South Bend, Indiana, U.S.
- Party: Republican
- Spouses: Unnamed first wife (m. ?–1939; her death); * Emma Lou Carter (m. 1947)
- Children: 1 (Nelson)
- Education: Howard University (B.S., L.L.B.)
- Occupation: Lawyer, politician

Military service
- Battles/wars: World War I; * World War II

Zilford C. Carter (November 21, 1899 – April 21, 1963) was a lawyer and state legislator in Indiana. He was a Republican.

== Biography ==
He was born in Mexia, Texas. He served in the U.S. Army during World War I, including in France. He graduated with a B.S. and then an L.L.B. degree from Howard University and became a lawyer in South Bend, Indiana. He returned to military service during World War II. In 1947, he was elected to the Indiana House of Representatives. He also served as a prosecutor and board member on a fair practices employment board. He was a member of the Knights of Pythias and American Legion.

Carter's wife of nine years died in 1939, at the age of 39, leaving Carter to raise their son, Nelson. On April 13, 1947, Carter married Emma Lou Carter, who would survive him by more than thirty years. Carter died at the age of 63 following a heart attack at his home in South Bend, having been pronounced dead on arrival at Memorial Hospital.

== See also ==
- List of African-American officeholders (1900–1959)
