= Veevers crater =

Meteorite impact crater in Western Australia

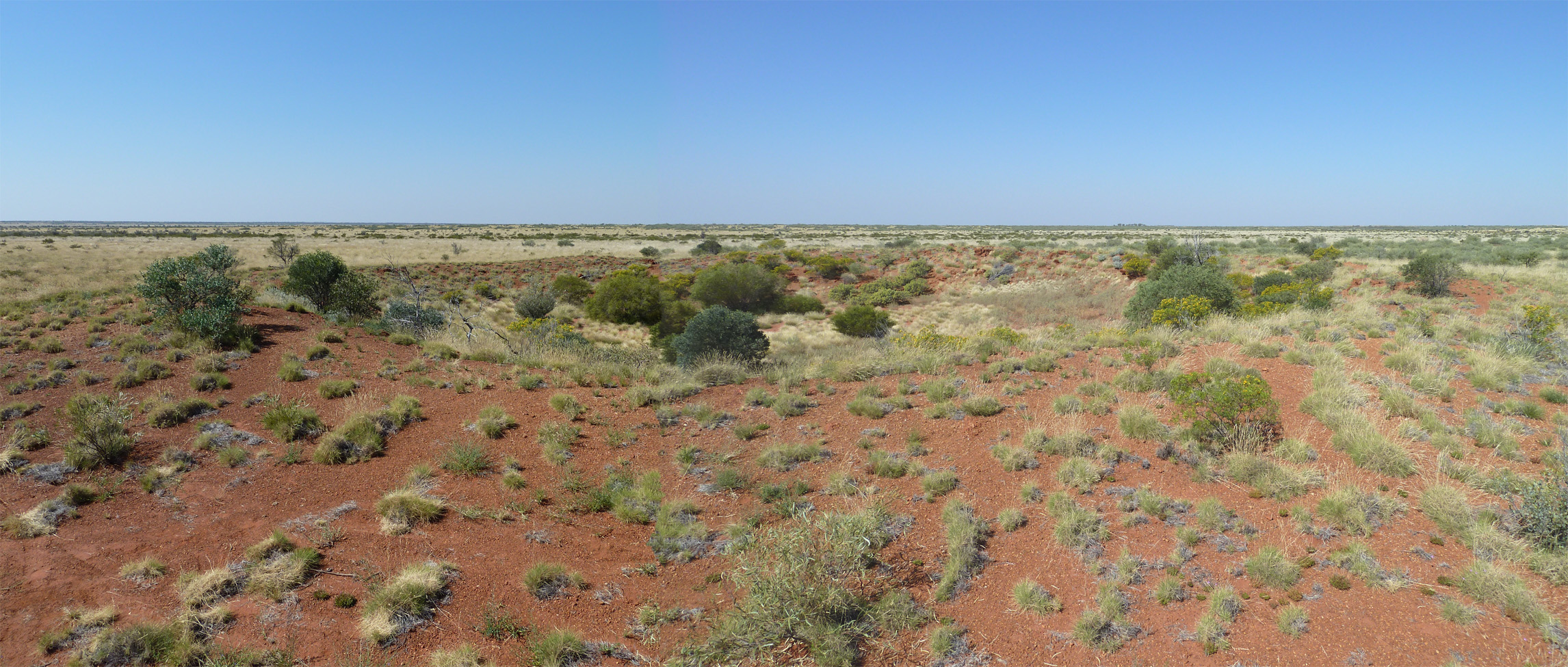
- Veevers Meteorite Crater, August 2011

- Location within Western Australia
- Location: Great Sandy & Gibson Deserts, Western Australia, Australia; 22.97°S 125.3725°E

Impact crater structure
- Confidence: Confirmed
- Diameter: 80 m (260 ft)
- Age: <1 Ma; Pleistocene
- Exposed: Yes
- Drilled: No
- Bolide type: iron meteorite (IIAB)

Veevers crater is an impact crater located on a flat desert plain between the Great Sandy and Gibson Deserts in the centre of the state of Western Australia.

The site is very remote and difficult to visit. The crater was discovered from the air in July 1975 during a government geological survey and named in honour of Australian geologist John Veevers who had worked in the area in the late 1970s. At the time of discovery a meteorite impact origin was suspected, but could not be proven. The subsequent discovery of iron meteorite fragments around the crater by E.M. and C.S. Shoemaker in 1987 removed any doubt about its origin.

== Description ==
The crater has a symmetrical bowl-shaped topography and is considered to be one of the best preserved small meteorite craters on Earth. The 20 m (66 ft) wide rim rises about 1.5 m (4 ft 11 in) above the plain, while the deepest point of the central depression is 7 m (23 ft) below the rim crest; the rim to rim diameter averages about 70 m (230 ft). Based on cosmogenic nuclide exposure dating of the crater walls, the crater is less than 20 thousand years old, while the pristine state of preservation of the ejecta has been used to suggest that it may in fact be less than 4 thousand years old.

The iron meteorite fragments collected around the crater are classified as a coarse octahedrite belonging to chemical class IIAB; the fragments show considerable evidence of deformation presumably related to the impact explosion. It has been inferred that the original meteorite was in the size range of 100–1,000 tonnes (220–2,200 thousand pounds), probably closer to the latter, now dispersed as fragments within the crater breccia and ejecta.

== See also ==
- 3689 Yeates
