= Charles Carter =

Charles, Charlie, or Chuck Carter may refer to:

== Arts and entertainment ==
- Charles Joseph Carter (1874–1936), American stage magician
- Charles Thomas Carter (c. 1735–1804), Irish composer and organist
- Charlton Heston (J. Charles Carter, 1923–2008), American film actor, known in private life as Charles or Chuck Carter
- Chuck Carter (born 1957), video game and film artist

== Politics and law ==
- Charles Carter (of Cleve) (1707–1764), Virginia planter and politician
- Charles Carter (of Ludlow) (1732–1796), son of Charles Carter (of Cleve), Virginia planter and politician
- Charles Carter (Alaska politician) (1870–1961), Alaskan politician, mayor of Juneau
- Charles Carter (New Zealand politician) (1822–1896), philanthropist, contractor, and politician
- Charles Bonham-Carter (1876–1955), British Army officer and governor of Malta
- Charles D. Carter (1868–1929), U.S. representative from Oklahoma
- Charles Hill Carter (1732–1806), Virginia planter (at Shirley and Coromotan) and politician
- Charles Newell Carter (born 1967), American politician from North Carolina
- Charles Carter (Bahamian journalist) (1943–2021), Bahamian journalist and politician

== Sports ==
- Charles B. Carter (1880–1927), American football player, lawyer and politician
- Kid Carter (Charles Carter, fl. 1903–1906), American baseball player
- Charlie Carter (hurler) (born 1971), Irish hurler
- Charlie Carter (cricketer) (born 1947), English cricketer
- Charlie Carter (footballer) (born 1996), English footballer

== Others ==
- Charles Frederick Carter (1919–2002), English economist and university administrator
- Charles Henry Carter (1828–1914), English Baptist missionary to Ceylon
- Charles Howard Carter (1927–1990), American professor of history
- Charles John Carter (died 1851), English architect and surveyor
