= Sam Carter =

Sam Carter may refer to:

- Sam Carter (athlete) (born 1991), Australian Paralympic athlete
- Sam Carter (musician), English folk musician
- Sam Carter (rugby union) (born 1989), Australian rugby union player
- Sam Carter, vocalist of the UK band Architects
- Shanna Swendson, American novelist using the pseudonym Samantha Carter
- Samantha Carter, a fictional character in Stargate
- Sam Carter, a fictional character in Deus Ex

== See also ==
- Samuel Carter (disambiguation)
