= Timothy Carter =

Timothy or Tim Carter may refer to:

- Timothy Carter (cricketer) (born 1969), former English cricketer
- Timothy Carter (field hockey) (born 1944), New Zealand field hockey player
- Timothy J. Carter (1800–1838), United States Representative from Maine
- Tim Carter (basketball) (born 1956), former head basketball coach for the University of Texas at San Antonio
- Tim Carter (defensive back) (born 1978), American football defensive back
- Tim Carter (footballer) (1967–2008), Sunderland goalkeeper and coach
- Tim Carter (musicologist) (born 1954), Australian professor at the University of North Carolina
- Tim Carter (producer), co-producer of Sesame Street
- Tim Carter (soccer), American youth development manager
- Tim Carter (wide receiver) (born 1979), American football wide receiver
- Tim Lee Carter (1910–1987), member of the United States House of Representatives
- Timothy Carter, a The Mentalist character
