= Roger Carter (footballer) =

English footballer (born 1937)

Personal information
- Full name: Roger Frank Carter
- Date of birth: 11 October 1937 (age 89)
- Place of birth: Great Yarmouth, England
- Height: 5 ft 10 in (1.78 m)
- Position: Inside forward

Senior career*
Years	Team	Apps	(Gls)
- Gorleston
1955–1960	Aston Villa	0	(0)
1960	Chelmsford City	0	(0)
1960–1961	Torquay United	5	(0)
- Bath City
- Hastings United
- Cambridge City
1965–1967	Ashford Town	41	(15)

Managerial career
- 1967–1975: Gorleston
- * Club domestic league appearances and goals

Roger Frank Carter (born 11 October 1937) is an English former footballer who played as a inside forward.

== Playing career ==
Carter began his career at local club Gorleston at the age of 16. In December 1955, Carter was signed by First Division club Aston Villa. Carter failed to make an appearance for Aston Villa, joining Chelmsford City in the summer of 1960. Before Carter played for Chelmsford, he was signed by Torquay United, with both Aston Villa and Chelmsford City receiving a fee. Whilst at Torquay, Carter made five appearances in the Football League, before dropping back into non-league football, signing for Bath City. Carter later played for Hastings United and Cambridge City, before signing for Ashford Town in 1965. Whilst at Ashford, Carter made 63 appearances in all competitions, scoring 23 goals.

== Managerial career ==
Following his retirement, Carter returned to former club Gorleston as manager, managing the club from 1967 to 1975.
