= Reginald Carter =

Reginald Carter may refer to:

- Reginald Carter (Australian cricketer) (1888–1970), Australian cricketer
- Reginald Carter (English cricketer) (1933–2015), English cricketer
- Reginald Carter (headmaster) (1868–1936), headmaster of Bedford School
- Reginald Carter (politician) (1887–1961), Australian politician
- Reggie Carter (1957–1999), American basketball player
- Reg Carter (1886–1949), British cartoonist
