= Russell Gordon Carter =

American author

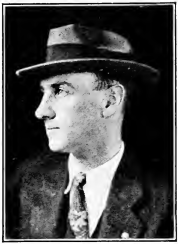
Russell Gordon Carter

Russell Gordon Carter (January 1, 1892 – May 9, 1957) was an American writer of more than fifty books and short stories, primarily for young people.

== Personal ==
Carter was born in Trenton, New Jersey on January 1, 1892, the son of John Rogers and Alice (Hughes) Carter. He worked his way through Harvard, and graduated in 1916. In 1917 he married Wellesley graduate Florence Diehl.

That same year he sailed to France with the American Expeditionary Forces in World War I. He was promoted twice, ending the war as a first lieutenant. He served thirteen months in France, taking part in the battles of Aisne-Marne, the Oise-Aisne, and the Meuse-Argonne offensive. He was awarded the Silver Star "for "gallantry in action."

Russell and Florence Carter had two daughters: Virginia (b.1923) Catherine (b.1930). Carter died on May 9, 1957, in Boston, Massachusetts.

== Work ==
After leaving the military in 1919, Carter took a job as a reader with the magazine The Youth's Companion in Boston, Massachusetts, for which he also wrote numerous stories. During this period he also wrote books such as the "Bob Hanson" series, for example Bob Hanson, Tenderfoot in 1921 (with R. H Bowles). In 1925, following the demise of the magazine, he became a full-time freelance writer.

Carter received several awards for his writing. Three Points of Honor (1929) won a prize from Little, Brown and Company and Boys' Life Magazine for the "best story based on the Boy Scout Oath." Shaggy, the Horse from Wyoming (1939) was awarded a prize from the Julia Ellsworth Ford Foundation for "The Encouragement of Juvenile Literature in America."

In addition to fiction, he was the author of a unit history in World War I: The 101st Field Artillery, written in 1940. This was rated as "one of the three best unit histories of the First World War" by the Infantry Journal.

Later in his career he branched out from young adult fiction into writing stories for mass-circulation magazines, such as The Saturday Evening Post, and for Catholic publications, such as Messenger of the Sacred Heart.

== Bibliography ==
This is a partial bibliography of works by Russell Gordon Carter.

=== Young adult novels ===
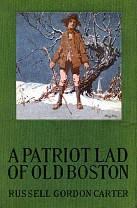
Dust Jacket: A Patriot Lad of Old Boston

- Bob Hanson series
  - Bob Hanson, Tenderfoot (1921), S. Gordon Smyth, ill.
  - Bob Hanson, Scout (1921), S. Gordon Smyth, ill.
  - Bob Hanson, First Class Scout (1922), Henry Pitz, ill.
  - Bob Hanson, Eagle Scout (1923), Paul D. Swisher, ill.
- Patriot Lad series
  - A Patriot Lad of Old Philadelphia (1923), Henry Pitz, ill.
  - A Patriot Lad of Old Boston (1923), Henry Pitz, ill.
  - A Patriot Lad of Old Salem (1925), Henry Pitz, ill.
  - A Patriot Lad of Old Trenton (1926), Nat Little, ill.
  - A Patriot Lad of Old Cape Cod (1927), Henry Pitz, ill.
  - A Patriot Lad of Old Long Island (1928), Charles Hargens, ill.
  - A Patriot Lad of Old Saratoga (1929), Charles Hargens, ill.
  - A Patriot Lad of Old Rhode Island (1930), Charles Hargens, ill.
  - A Patriot Lad of Old Maine (1932), Charles Hargens, ill.
  - A Patriot Lad of Old New Hampshire (1933), Charles Hargens, ill.
  - A Patriot Lad of Old Connecticut (1935), Charles Hargens, ill.
  - A Patriot Lad of Old West Point (1936), Frederic A. Anderson, ill.
- Red Gilbert series
  - Red Gilbert's Flying Circus (1924), Percy Couse, ill.
  - Red Gilbert's Floating Menagerie (1926), W.H. Wolf, ill.
- Other
  - The Glory of Peggy Harrison (with Harford Powell, Jr), 1927
  - The White Plume of Navarre (1928), Beatrice Stevens, ill.
  - The Giant's House (with Harford Powell, Jr), (1928), A.D. Ra, ill.
  - Three Points of Honor (1929)
  - The King's Spurs (1930), Leo O'Donnell, ill.
  - The Singing Dog and a Whole Gallery of Barnyard Friends (1931), Bessie Crawford Watson, ill.
  - His Own Star (1931)
  - Yellow Jacket: The Story of a Domestic Cat (1931), Ralph Carlyle Prather, ill.
  - The Crimson Cutlass (1933), Frank E. Schoonover, ill.
  - City of Adventure (1934), Manning De V. Lee, ill.
  - The Golden Galleon (1936)
  - Brothers of the Frontier (1938), Armstrong Sperry, ill.
  - Shaggy, the Horse from Wyoming (1939), E. R. Bradley, ill.
  - Teen-Age Historical Stories (1948)
  - Teen-Age Animal stories (1949)

=== Other books ===
- Good luck, lieutenant! (1932)
- The 101st field artillery, A. E. F., 1917-1919 (1940)
- Mr. Whatley enjoys himself (1954)

=== Short stories ===
Carter wrote a number of short stories that appeared in "magazines such as Story Parade, Boys' Life, [and] St. Nicholas." "Beneath the Saddle" and "Old Sly Eye" were reprinted in school readers. The books Teen-age Historical Storie andTeen-age Animal Stories consisted of previously published stories.
