= Howard Carter (businessman) =

British inventor and businessman

- Occupations: Founder & Managing Director
- Employer: incognito
- Known for: Insect bite prevention expert

Howard Carter is a British inventor and businessman. He founded the company incognito in 2007. He is an expert in the field of insects and specifically as a mosquito bite prevention expert. After contracting two life-threatening diseases from mosquito bites, despite using a high-percentage DEET-based repellent, he was motivated to invent a totally natural, equally effective mosquito repellent, incognito anti-mosquito. This was, in part, because statistics were suggesting more mosquitoes were becoming resistant to synthetic repellents that contained controversial pesticides such as DDT and DEET.

Carter appeared on the UK show Dragons’ Den in 2009 to raise capital and publicity for his startup. In more recent years, Carter has frequently appeared in the media, speaking about mosquitoes and the spread of disease on BBC News. He acted as an advisor to the British and Brazilian governments in the run-up to the 2016 Rio Olympics. Meeting the Queen and other members of the royal family at Buckingham Palace in 2015 he accepted the Queen's Award for Sustainable Development on behalf of his company incognito®. His company won the highest UK business award for a second time, in the coveted Sustainable Development category, in 2020.

== Early career ==
Howard Carter studied in biochemistry, before he began his career in publishing with help from Saatchi & Saatchi. He ran two successful fashion magazines, Midnight and Mode Avantgarde, then London Property News as Advertisement Manager, sold to News International (For £10m?) eventually becoming a director of Hill Publishing, launching and running a number of titles before selling them to Columbus Plc: acquired by Highgate which in turn was bought by Archant. From the late 80’s throughout the 90’s Carter was the goto for publishing in the London real estate market. He also wrote for many publications such as GQ magazine.

Whilst traveling through India, on assignment, Carter contracted malaria in a remote part of the country. Despite taking all the necessary precautions, including anti malarial tablets, and using a 100% DEET insect repellent spray, he was still bitten. In order to recover from the disease, he travelled over 1,000 miles to Mumbai, where he was treated. Shortly after the incident, recuperating in Thailand from the malaria, again he was bitten by Aedes mosquitoes. Again he took the necessary precautions, this time wearing 50% DEET insect repellent, but more mosquito bites resulted in him contracting Dengue fever. He was in the Hospital of Tropical Medicine and was informed that he was lucky to be alive.

== Career ==
As a result of contracting two life-threatening diseases in the space of a year, Carter was motivated to change careers and he decided to go back into biochemistry which he had studied earlier on. After carrying out research into mosquitoes and bite avoidance, Carter founded incognito in 2007. The company was founded on the principle of a single product, an insect repellent spray.

In 2009, Carter appeared on the English version of the TV show, Dragons' Den. He turned down an offer from James Caan, who wanted a 40% stake in the business valued at £1m. The business than raised funds elsewhere, which totalled £250,000 in 2011. in 2013 Incognito had a second round of funding through the ethical bank Triodos.

One of the biggest focuses of the product was to create a chemical-free repellent. With the rise in global warming, Carter predicted that the demand for this type of product would grow dramatically over the next decade.

Carter theorised in 2013 during an interview with the Huffington Post that the Anopheles albamanus mosquito and others had become partly resistant to DEET, DDT and other forms of pesticide used commonly in many high-street repellents.

Carter's logic of using natural ingredients, predominantly from South East Asia, means that the repellent works against breeds of mosquitoes that are resistant to widely used pesticides.

In 2016, Carter featured in The Independent to discuss the growing numbers of mosquitoes in the south of the United Kingdom during summer months. He warned that areas such as Sussex were more commonly seeing mosquitoes during the summer, which could lead to a health pandemic in the future if these mosquitoes carried diseases such as malaria. He stated that female mosquitoes tend to lay their eggs in wet grooves, meaning tyre tread on cars or vans from the continent are a suitable place for pregnant females to lay their eggs.

Carter continued with his warnings on the spread of the Zika virus, mainly during the 2016 Rio Olympics. He was an advisor to both the Brazilian government and British government regarding the safety of its athletes and citizens during the run-up to the event. Later that year, clinical tests showed that incognito was 100% effective at stopping Zika-carrying mosquitoes from biting humans for five hours.

In 2017, Howard Carter was recognized by The Guardian when a product he had developed as part of the incognito range – the dual action natural suncream insect repellent won a Janey Lee Grace Platinum Award. This was the 6th year running that incognito had won a Janey Lee Grace Platinum Award for its products. The incognito insect repellent SPF30 sunscreen is the only one in the world that is certified by COSMOS, The Vegan Society and the Ethical Shopping Guide as being 100% natural. In clinical testing by the London School of Hygiene & Tropical Medicine it achieved a complete protection time of 5 hours on Aedes aegypti mosquitoes.

In July 2020, The Times interviewed Howard Carter about how the COVID-19 pandemic was helping to increase mosquito populations in the UK. He stated that unmanaged properties containing unkempt gardens gave mosquitoes free rein to breed.
