= Andrew Carter =

Andrew or Andy Carter may refer to:

- Andrew Carter (composer) (1939–2026), English composer and conductor
- Andrew L. Carter Jr. (born 1969), US district court judge
- Andrew P. Carter, British structural biologist
- Andy Carter (athlete) (born 1949), British middle-distance runner
- Andy Carter (baseball) (born 1968), American baseball pitcher
- Andy Carter (cricketer) (born 1988), English cricketer
- Andy Carter (politician) (born 1974), British Conservative Party politician
- Sergeant Andrew Carter, a character from the TV show Hogan's Heroes
