= William W. Carter =

American politician

William Carter

Member of the Kansas House of Representatives from the 1st district
- In office 1915 – January 13, 1919
- Succeeded by: John S. Norman

Personal details
- Party: Republican

William W. Carter was an American politician who was a member of the Kansas House of Representatives from 1915 to 1919.

Carter lived in Wathena, Kansas during his time in the legislature.
