= Harold Carter =

Harold Carter may refer to:

- Harold Carter (footballer) (1900–1973), Australian rules footballer
- Harold Carter, Baron Carter of Haslemere (born 1958), British lawyer and peer
- Harold A. Carter (1937–2013), senior pastor of New Shiloh Baptist Church in Baltimore, Maryland
- Harold Burnell Carter (1910–2005), Australian scientist

== See also ==
- Harry Carter (disambiguation)
