= Keith Carter =

Keith Carter may refer to:

- Keith Carter (American football) (born 1982), American football coach and tight end
- Keith Carter (basketball) (born 1976), American basketball player and college athletics administrator
- Keith Carter (comedian) (born 1969), English comedian, writer, and actor
- Keith Carter (gymnast) (born 1952), Canadian Olympic gymnast
- Keith Carter (photographer) (born 1948), American photographer, educator, and artist
- Keith Carter (swimmer) (1924–2013), American swimmer
- Big Kap (real name Keith Carter, 1970–2016), American hip hop DJ
