= Frederic Carter =

English cricketer

Frederic Asgill Carter
Personal information
- Born: June 13, 1853; Newnham on Severn, Gloucestershire, England
- Died: August 1, 1924 (aged 71); Hurlingham, London, England
- Batting: Right-handed
- Bowling: Right-arm fast (roundarm)

Domestic team information
- Years: Team
- 1871–1873: Gloucestershire

Frederic Asgill Carter (13 June 1853 – 1 August 1924) was an English first-class cricketer. He was a right-handed batsman and a roundarm right arm fast bowler who played mainly for Gloucestershire County Cricket Club from 1871 to 1873. Carter was born at Newnham on Severn, Gloucestershire.

Carter made 10 first-class appearances, scoring 75 runs at a batting average of 7.50, and a high score of 13 not out. He held 6 catches in his career and took 2 wickets at 44.00, with a best analysis of 1–15.

Carter died at Hurlingham, London on 1 August 1924.
