= Paula Carter =

American politician (1940–2001)

Paula Jean Davis Carter (May 17, 1940 – November 5, 2001) was an American Democratic politician who served in the Missouri House of Representatives. She was also elected to the Missouri Senate as the first African-American woman to represent the Fifth Senatorial District from the city of St. Louis.

Born in St. Louis, Missouri, she previously worked as a chief of staff in the circuit clerk's office and as a precinct captain for J. B. "Jet" Banks.

== Personal life ==
Carter was Catholic.
