= Thomas Carter =

Thomas Carter may refer to:

== Arts and entertainment ==
- Thomas Carter (composer) (1769–1800), Irish composer
- Thomas Carter (director) (born 1953), American actor and film director
- Thomas Carter (sculptor) (1702–1756), British sculptor
- T. K. Carter (Thomas Kent Carter, 1956–2026), American actor

== Politics ==
- Thomas Carter (1690–1763), Irish politician, MP for Trim, Hillsborough, Dungarvan, and Lismore
- Thomas Carter (died 1726) (1650–1726), Irish politician, MP for Fethard and Portarlington
- Thomas Carter (died 1835), British politician and Member of Parliament for Tamworth
- Thomas Carter (Hull MP) (c. 1714–1767), English politician, MP for Kingston upon Hull 1747–1754
- Thomas Carter (Old Leighlin MP) (1720–1765), Irish politician, MP for Old Leighlin 1745–1761
- Thomas Carter (New Zealand politician) (1827–1900), third superintendent of Marlborough Province
- Thomas Carter (TD) (1882–1951), Irish Sinn Féin/Cumann na nGaedhael/Fianna Fáil politician
- Thomas Carter (Virginia politician) (1731–1803), Virginia delegate
- Thomas H. Carter (1854–1911), American politician from Montana

== Religion ==
- Thomas Carter (minister) (1608–1684), English-born American Puritan minister
- Thomas Carter (Dean of Tuam) (fl. early 19th century), Irish Anglican priest
- Thomas Thellusson Carter (1808–1901), English Protestant clergyman

== Sports ==
- Thomas Nevile Carter (1851–1879), English footballer
- Thomas Carter (born 1974), American professional wrestler known as Reckless Youth

== Other ==
- Thomas Carter (ornithologist) (1863–1931), English ornithologist active in Australia
- Thomas Carter (writer) (died 1867), British Army clerk and military writer
- Thomas Carter (inventor), inventor of Carterfone
- Thomas Francis Carter (1882–1925), American scholar who wrote about the origins of printing in China
- Thomas Henry Carter (soldier) (1831–1908), American army officer
- Thomas L. Carter, commercial pilot and major general in the Air Force Reserve Command
- Thomas S. Carter (1921–2019), American engineer, president of Kansas City Southern Railway
- Thomas Carter of the Carter Brothers, partner of the California railroad car manufacturing firm
- Thomas Carter (entrepreneur), American entrepreneur

== See also ==
- Charles Thomas Carter (c. 1735–1804), Irish composer
- Tom Carter (disambiguation)
