= T. J. Carter =

T. J. Carter may refer to:

- T. J. Carter (basketball) (born 1985), American basketball player
- T. J. Carter (defensive back) (born 1999), American football player
- T. J. Carter (defensive lineman) (born 1998), American football player
- T. J. Carter, better known as Lil Silva, English record producer, singer, songwriter and DJ
