= Henry H. Carter (linguist) =

American linguist

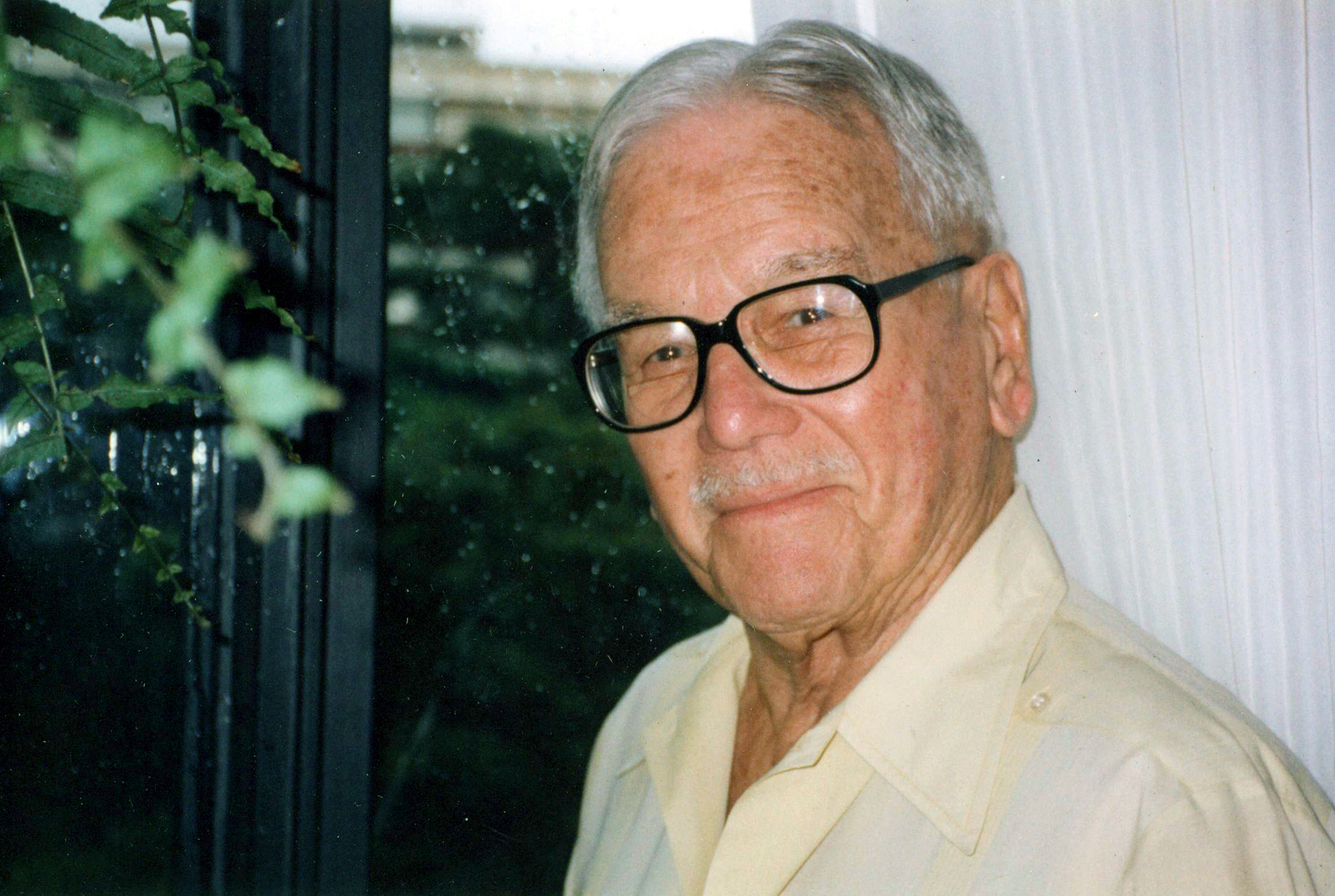
Henry H. Carter

Henry Hare Carter (28 June 1905 – 2001) was an American linguistics professor, commander in the US Naval Reserve, and translator.

Among his teaching specialties were Spanish literature; the history of the Spanish language; and Spanish poetry, drama, and prose. He spoke seven languages.

During his student days, he would often travel and study abroad during the summers in Europe with foreign studies, including Madrid in 1931, the Sorbonne (Paris) in 1933, Corsi Roma (Rome) 1937, and Coimbra, Portugal in 1939.

For most of his professional life, he was interested in the translation of 12th- and 13th-century manuscripts, written by monks, about the stories of Joseph of Arimathea and the Holy Grail, and the legend of El Cid. He also was a scout on his travels in South America and Spain for new Spanish words included in the Williams' Spanish-English Dictionary. The front cover of the paperback edition included his endorsement of the book.

Henry Carter was elected to numerous academies, both in the United States and abroad, including the Brazilian Academy of Philology (1971), the Academy of Sciences, Lisbon (1975), and Académico de Mérito, in the Portuguese Academy of History (1989).

During World War II, he was assigned to the Office of Naval Intelligence, serving in Washington, D.C., Puerto Rico, and Brazil, where he was the liaison officer between the American and Brazilian navies. He retired from the US Naval Reserve with the rank of commander. During his Navy years, he wrote Paleographical Edition and Study of the Language of a Portion of Codex Alcobacensis 200 (published posthumously) and Cancioneiro da Ajuda: A Diplomatic Edition (1941).

Carter died in 2001.

== Works ==
- Paleographical Edition and Study of the Language of a Portion of Codex Alcobacensis 200; Philadelphia: University of Pennsylvania, 1938.
- Cancioneiro da Ajuda: A Diplomatic Edition; New York: Modern Language Association of America, 1941 (Dewey: 869.1).
- Contos e anedotas brasileiros; A Graded Portuguese Reader, Boston: D. C. Heath and Co., 1942.
- The Portuguese book of Joseph of Arimathea—Paleographical edition with Introduction, Linguistic study, Notes, Plates & Glossary, (editor), North Carolina; Chapel Hill-University of North Carolina, 1967.
- Cuentos de España hoy (compiled by); Holt, Rinehart and Winston, 1974. ISBN 0-03-086042-3
