= Anthony Carter =

Anthony or Tony Carter may refer to:

== Sports ==
=== American football ===
- Anthony Carter (American football) (born 1960), wide receiver
- Tony Carter (running back) (born 1972), American football player
- Tony Carter (cornerback) (born 1986), American football player

=== Other sports ===
- Tony Carter (footballer) (1881–1970), English full back
- Anthony Carter (basketball) (born 1975), American point guard and coach
- Anthony Carter (baseball) (born 1986), American pitcher
- Anthony Carter (soccer, born 1994), Australian association football player

== Music ==
- Anthony Carter, one half of the Irish duo The Carter Twins

== Fictional characters ==
- Anthony Carter (Death Note), or Anthony Rester, in the 2003–2006 manga series Death Note
