= Kenneth Carter =

Kenneth, Ken, or Kenny Carter may refer to:

- Ken Carter (born 1959), former American high school basketball coach in Richmond, California
- "Ken Carter" (song), a 1995 song by Ammonia
- Ken Carter (stuntman) (1938–1983), Canadian stunt driver
- Kenneth Carter (accountant) (1906–1968), Canadian chartered accountant
- Kenneth Carter (politician) (1933–2017), American politician in Rhode Island
- Kenny Carter (1961–1986), English speedway driver who shot his wife and himself
- Kenny Carter (American football) (born 1967), American football coach
