= Samuel Casey Carter =

American writer

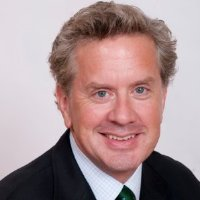
- Born: Pittsburgh, PA
- Education: University of Oxford; Catholic University of America; St. John's College (Annapolis/Santa Fe)
- Occupations: Author, researcher, non-profit executive
- Website: www.carter-research.com

Samuel Casey Carter is an American author, researcher, non-profit executive, and education management entrepreneur. He is known for his work for the public and private school systems including KIPP, the Cristo Rey Network, National Heritage Academies, and Faith in the Future.

== Early life and education ==
Carter was born in Pittsburgh, Pennsylvania, and moved to Washington, D.C., when he was a young child, where he attended Annunciation Catholic School while his father served in the Nixon and Ford administrations. Carter graduated from the Portsmouth Abbey School in 1984 and matriculated at St. John's College in Annapolis, MD (from which he received a 2013 Award of Merit. His post-graduate work included studies at Middlebury College, the University of Oxford, and the Catholic University of America. Carter is a descendant of Charles Carroll, sole Catholic signatory of the Declaration of Independence.

== Career ==
From 1994 to 1998, Carter was the executive editor of Crisis Magazine.

Carter was a Bradley Fellow at the Heritage Foundation from 1998 to 2000, during which time he wrote about issues of school choice and competition in K-12 education. While at the Heritage Foundation, as a part of their No Excuses Campaign and to honor the Salvatori Prize for American Citizenship, Carter wrote No Excuses: Seven Principals of Low-Income Schools Who Set the Standard for High Achievement in 1999.

In April 2000, Carter's first book, No Excuses: Lessons from 21 High-Performing, High-Poverty Schools, was published by the Heritage Foundation. A review by Richard Rothstein in the New York Times challenged the book's value, citing "contempt for most public education", prompting a response from Carter published in the paper on the same day as Rothstein's subsequent column. In 2008, Washington Post education columnist Jay Mathews ran a contest to label highly-successful schools serving low-income neighborhoods. A majority of respondents endorsed Carter's "No Excuses Schools".

In 2003, Carter joined the Advisory Board Company. There, he worked as a director of research in their management consulting and leadership development divisions, H*Works and The Academies.

From 2005 to 2007, Carter was president of National Heritage Academies, where he oversaw corporate strategy and the implementation of educational operations with a focus on turning around low-performing schools.

In 2010, Carter's second book, On Purpose: How Great School Cultures Form Strong Character, was published by Corwin Press.

In 2011, Carter, as a senior vice president, developed global strategy for Houghton Mifflin Harcourt's corporate social responsibility mission and served as executive director of the HMH Foundation.

In 2012, Carter became the founding chief executive officer of Faith in the Future. This partnership, initially established for a five-year period, was extended through 2022 in early 2016

== Published works ==
- Carter, Samuel Casey (1999). No Excuses: Seven Principals of Low-Income Schools Who Set the Standard for High Achievement. Washington, D.C.: Heritage Foundation.
- Carter, Samuel Casey (2000). No Excuses: Lessons from 21 High-Performing, High-Poverty Schools. Washington, D.C.: Heritage Foundation. ISBN 978-0891950905
- Carter, Samuel Casey (2000). No Hay Excusas: Lecciones De 20 Escuelas De Escasos Recursos Y Alto Rendimiento (Spanish). Washington, D.C.,: Heritage Foundation. ISBN 978-0891951070
- Carter, Samuel Casey (editor) (2009). Mandate for Change: A Bold Agenda for the Incoming Government. Washington, D.C.: Center for Education Reform.
- Carter, Samuel Casey (2011). On Purpose: How Great School Cultures Form Strong Character. Los Angeles, CA: Corwin Press. ISBN 978-1412986724
- Carter, Samuel Casey (co-author) (2012). Data Backpacks: Portable Records & Learner Profiles. Washington, D.C.: Foundation for Excellence in Education.
- Carter, Samuel Casey (2016). Quando la scuola educa (12 progetti formativi di successo) (Italian). Rome, Italy: Città Nuova Editrice. ISBN 978-8831104234
