= Peter Carter =

Peter Carter may refer to:

- Peter Carter (academic lawyer) (1921–2004), Fellow of Wadham College, Oxford
- Piero Lulli (1929–1991) actor credited as Peter Carter
- Peter Carter (author) (1929–1999), British children's writer
- Peter Carter (director) (1933–1982), Canadian film and television director
- Peter Carter (tennis) (1964–2002), Australian tennis player and coach
- Peter Carter (nurse), British nurse
- Pete Carter (1938–2011), British trade unionist
- Peter Carter (footballer) (born 1959), Australian rules footballer
- Peter J. Carter (1845–1886), American politician in Virginia

== See also ==
- Peter Carter-Ruck (1914–2003), English lawyer
- Peter Karter (1922–2010), American nuclear engineer
