= Dave Carter (powerlifter) =

British powerlifter

Dave Carter (born 8 August 1947) is a British powerlifter and is a former British, European and World Powerlifting champion, competing in the 125kg deadlift and squat categories.

David Thomas Carter was born in Aldershot in Hampshire. For every year between 1988 and 2007 (except for 1996 and 1998) he held the World Deadlift Record, similarly holding the European Record in the same category for 1976 and 1991 to 2007. He was a holder of 16 British titles, including 1975 to 1998 (except 1977 to 1979, 1981 and 1987) when he held the British record for the deadlift. In 1994 with Brian Smith he reformed British powerlifting, setting up the properly regulated British Powerlifting Organisation. He is the President of the British Powerlifting Organisation (BPO) and the World Powerlifting Federation (WPF).

Today, in addition to his administrative work and coaching in powerlifting, Carter is also an independent financial adviser. With his wife Phyllis he has two daughters, Deborah and Tracy. He lives in his home town of Aldershot.
