= Frank Carter =

Frank Carter may refer to:

- Frank Carter (American football) (born 1977), American football player
- Frank Carter (diver) (born 1942), British Olympic diver
- Frank Carter (murderer) (1881–1927), Irish-born sniper murderer in Omaha, Nebraska
- Frank Carter (musician) (born 1984), English vocalist formerly of the bands Gallows and Pure Love, now of Frank Carter & the Rattlesnakes
- Frank Carter (Irish politician) (1910–1988), Irish Fianna Fáil politician
- Frank Carter (American politician) (1862–1954), American politician
- Sir Frank Willington Carter (1865–1945), British philanthropist and co-founder of the British Empire Leprosy Relief Association

== See also ==
- Francis Carter (disambiguation)
