= Stephen Carter =

Stephen Carter may refer to:

== Sports ==
- Stephen Carter (footballer) (born 1974), Australian rules footballer

== Music ==
- Stephen Carter, one half of the Irish duo The Carter Twins
- Stephen Carter, guitarist with punk band Gallows

== Other ==
- Stephen Carter (architect) (born 1945), American architect
- Stephen Carter (Louisiana politician) (1943–2021), Louisiana state representative
- Stephen Carter (MP), Member of Parliament for Scarborough
- Stephen Carter (sea captain), Manx master mariner and captain of the parish of Lonan
- Stephen Carter, Baron Carter of Barnes (born 1964), former Downing Street Chief of Staff
- Stephen L. Carter (born 1954), American law professor and writer
- Stephen R. Carter (editor), editor and publications director of the Mormon periodical Sunstone

== See also ==
- Steve Carter (disambiguation)
