= Ron Carter (disambiguation) =

Ron Carter (born 1937) is an American jazz double-bassist.

Ron or Ronald Carter may also refer to:

- Ron Carter (basketball) (born 1956), American basketball player
- Ron Carter (businessman) (born 1935), New Zealand businessman
- Ron Carter (ice hockey) (born 1958), Canadian professional ice hockey right winger
- Ronald Carter (linguist) (1947–2018), British linguist
- Ronald Carter (sport shooter) (born 1938), British sport shooter
- Ronald G. Carter (1932–2008), American author
