= Roy Carter =

Roy Carter may refer to:

- Roy Carter (oboist), English oboist
- Roy Carter (footballer) (born 1954), English footballer
- Roy Carter (producer) (born 1955), English musician, songwriter and music producer
- Roy Carter, co-founder of Gargoyle Games
- Roy Carter, gospel singer with The Chuck Wagon Gang
