= Linda Carter (disambiguation) =

Linda Carter is a fictional character from the British soap opera EastEnders

Linda Carter or Lynda Carter may also refer to:

- Linda S. Carter (born 1963), American politician
- Linda Carter Brinson (born 1948), American journalist
- Lynda Carter (born 1951), American actress and singer
- Linda Carter, a fictional character from Marvel Comics also known as Night Nurse
