= Greg Carter =

Greg Carter may refer to:

- Greg Carter (American football) (born 1954), American football coach and former baseball player
- Greg Carter (filmmaker), American filmmaker
- Greg Carter (theatre director), American theatre director
