= Jason Carter =

Jason Carter may refer to:

- Jason Carter (actor) (born 1960), English actor
- Jason Carter (Australian footballer) (born 2000), Australian rules footballer for Fremantle FC
- Jason Carter (fiddler) (born 1973), American bluegrass musician
- Jason Carter (gridiron football) (born 1982), American football player
- Jason Carter (politician) (born 1975), state senator of Georgia and grandson of former U.S. President Jimmy Carter
- Jason Carter (Little House), fictional character
