= Harry Carter =

Harry Carter may refer to:

- Harry Carter (actor) (1879–1952), American actor
- Harry Carter (politician) (1874–1952), member of the New South Wales Legislative Assembly
- Harry Carter (smuggler) (1749–1809), smuggling member of the Carters of Prussia Cove
- Harry Carter (typographer) (1901–1982), English typographer and writer
- Harry William Carter (1787–1863), English physician
- Harry Carter Stuart (1893–1963), Virginia cattleman and state senator

== See also ==
- Harold Carter (disambiguation)
- Henry Carter (disambiguation)
