= Richard Carter (land agent) =

Richard Carter was a land agent and surveyor in Halifax, West Yorkshire, England. In 1846 he introduced Thomas Archer Hirst and John Tyndall, who both worked for him and later became members of the X Club.
