= Stuart Carter =

Stuart Carter also refer to:

- Stuart B. Carter (1906–1983), Virginia lawyer and state senator
- Stuart Carter (rower) (1958–2025), Australian Olympic coxswain

== See also ==
- Stuart Bonham Carter (1879–1972), British admiral
- George Stuart Carter (1893–1969), British zoologist and zoological author
