= Earl Carter =

Earl Carter may refer to:

== Given name and surname ==
- Buddy Carter (Earl Leroy "Buddy" Carter; born 1957), American politician; U.S. Representative from Georgia
- E. N. J. Carter, American novelist and advertising copywriter

== Middle name and surname ==
- Jimmy Carter (James Earl Carter Jr.; 1924–2024); American politician and philanthropist; 39th president of the United States (1977–1981)
- James Earl Carter Sr. (1894–1953); American politician, businessman, and farmer; father of Jimmy Carter
- Asa Earl Carter (1925–1979), 1950s Ku Klux Klan leader, segregationist speechwriter, and Western novelist
- Rod Carter (American football) (Roderick Earl Carter; born 1966); former American football linebacker
- Robert Carter (priest) (Robert Earl Carter; 1927–2010); American Roman Catholic priest and LGBT rights activist
