= Wilson Carter =

Scottish footballer

Personal information
- Full name: Wilson Carter
- Place of birth: Scotland
- Position: Forward

Senior career*
Years	Team	Apps	(Gls)
1963–1964	Morton	0	(0)
1964–1967	Queen's Park	15	(0)

International career
1965–1967	Scotland Amateurs	5	(1)
- * Club domestic league appearances and goals

Wilson Carter is a retired Scottish amateur footballer who played in the Scottish League for Queen's Park as a forward. He was capped by Scotland at amateur level.
