= Attorney General Carter =

Attorney General Carter may refer to:

- Henry A. P. Carter (1837–1891), Attorney General of the Kingdom of Hawaii
- Pamela Carter (Indiana politician) (born 1949), Attorney General of Indiana
- Steve Carter (Indiana politician) (born 1954), Attorney General of Indiana

== See also ==
- Attorney General McCarter (disambiguation)
