= Patrick Carter =

Patrick Carter may refer to:

- Patrick Carter, Baron Carter of Coles (born 1946), British businessman, chairman of the review panel examining the future of NHS pathology
- Pat Carter (born 1966), American football tight end
- Patrick Carter (American football) (born 1985), American football wide receiver
