= Don Carter =

Don Carter may refer to:

- Don Carter (bowler) (1926–2012), American professional bowler
- Donald Carter (businessman) (1933–2018), basketball entrepreneur
- Don Carter (footballer) (1921–2002), footballer for Bury FC and Blackburn Rovers
- Don Carter (ice hockey) (1936–2024), Canadian ice hockey player
- Don Carter, creator of the TV short Happy Monster Band
