= Ann Carter (rioter) =

English activist (died 1629)

Ann Carter (née Barrington; died 1629) was an English activist from Maldon, Essex, who was executed for her leading part in the Maldon grain riots of 1629. She used the title "captain", and was hanged on 30 May 1629.

== Biography ==
Carter was born Ann Barrington. She married John Carter, a butcher, in 1620. They lived in Maldon.

Ann evidently had a habit of speaking her mind, and was brought before Maldon's magistrates at 'quarter sessions' a number of times, for a number of reasons. In 1622 she appeared for having called one of the town magistrates "a bloodsucker". In 1623 she appeared after telling a bailiff - who reprimanded for not attending church - that she'd go to church if he found someone to do her work, and informing him she served God as well as he did. In 1624, a sergeant at mace attempted to arrest her husband, John; Ann responded to this attempt by repeatedly hitting the sergeant over the head with a cudgel.

On 16 March 1629, Ann Carter led a force of over 100 rioters - primarily women and children - to board a Flemish grain ship and carry grain away in their caps and aprons. These rioters were part of protests about the high price of grain, and the export of grain despite the need for it at home.

Women often were key players in protests, particularly when it involved grain. Firstly, prosecution of women was legally complex at the time, and may have been seen as less likely to happen - some people believed that women could not be held to the law (as the law often required prosecuting the woman's husband, holding him responsible for her actions). Secondly, magistrates may have been more inclined to capitulate to the demands of women, as it was easier to 'save face' while doing so: giving in to men's demands might be seen as cowardice and giving in to threats, whereas giving in to women's demands could be framed as showing compassion.

The riots seemed to be successful, as, two weeks later, the court agreed to somewhat reduce the price of corn. However, the protestors felt this reduction was insufficient and unjust. Ann, presumably buoyed by the success of their protests so far, immediately took to further actions, and began to rally support from other workers in the area (such as cloth workers, whose industry was experiencing a depression).

On 22 May, Ann led another riot, this one even larger. The Privy Council carried out a special commission, and Captain Ann Carter, seen as a rabble-rouser and leader, was hanged.

== Legacy ==
Maldon brewery Farmer's Ales has named a beer "Captain Ann" in her honour.
