= Matt Carter =

Matt or Matthew Carter may refer to:

- Matt Carter (Canadian football) (born 1986), Canadian football wide receiver
- Matt Carter (cricketer) (born 1996), English cricketer
- Matt Carter, guitarist for the band Emery
- Matt Carter (politician) (born 1972), former General Secretary of the British Labour Party
- Matt Carter (racing driver) (born 1981), automobile racer
- Matt Carter (Coronation Street), a character on Coronation Street
- Matthew Carter (born 1937), typeface designer
- Matthew Carter (diver) (born 2000), Australian diver
- Matthew G. Carter (1913–2012), first African-American mayor of Montclair, New Jersey
- Matthew Carter (businessman), British businessman and motorsport engineer
