= Donald B. Campbell =

Australian-born astronomer and professor of astronomy

Donald B. Campbell is an Australian-born astronomer and Professor of Astronomy at Cornell University. Prior to joining the Cornell faculty he was Director of the Arecibo Observatory in Puerto Rico for seven years. Campbell's research work is in the general area of planetary studies with a concentration on the radio-wavelength-scattering properties of planets, planetary satellites, and small bodies. His work includes studies of Venus, the Moon, the Galilean satellites of Jupiter, Titan, as well as comets and asteroids. Campbell observed near-Earth asteroid 433 Eros, which was the first asteroid detected by the Arecibo Observatory radar system.

== Honors and awards ==
- NASA Exceptional Scientific Achievement Medal (1984)
- Fellow of the American Association for the Advancement of Science (2003)
- The asteroid 4553 is named in his honor
