= Paul Carter =

Paul Carter may refer to:

== Sports ==
- Paul Carter (1910s pitcher) (1894–1984), Major League Baseball pitcher
- Paul Carter (1930s pitcher) (1900–?), American Negro leagues baseball player
- Paul Carter (squash player) (born 1963), English squash player
- Paul Carter (basketball) (born 1987), American basketball player
- Paul Carter (rugby league) (born 1992), Australian rugby league footballer

== Others ==
- Paul Carter (entrepreneur) (1927–1979), American entrepreneur and businessman in Chattanooga, Tennessee
- Paul Carter (academic) (born 1951), British historian, writer, artist and interdisciplinary scholar at the University of Melbourne
- Paul Carter (artist) (1970–2006), Scottish artist
- Paul D. Carter (born 1980), Australian teacher and author
- Paul Carter (songwriter) (born 1988), English songwriter and music producer
- Sir Paul Carter (politician), British politician

== See also ==
- Paul Carter Harrison (1936–2021), American playwright and professor
- Paul Van Carter (born 1976), British film producer, novelist, and music producer
