= Ellen Carter =

British artist (1762–1815)

Ellen Carter (née Vavasour; 1762 – 22 September 1815) was an English artist and book illustrator.

Carter was the daughter of Walter Vavasour of Weston in Yorkshire, and Ellen, his wife, daughter of Edward Elmsall of Thornhill in the same county. She was born in 1762, and baptised at St Olave's Church, York, on 16 May. At an early age, though a Protestant, she was placed in a convent at Rouen, with which her family had been connected for some generations. Though strongly affected by the surrounding influence of the Catholic Church, she never actually forsook her own religion, and after her return to England she became well known for her devotion to her church.

In November 1787, she married the curate of Thornhill, the Rev. John Carter. Her husband became the head-master of Lincoln Grammar School, and incumbent of St. Swithin's church.

Carter was devoted to artistic pursuits, and particularly excelled in drawing the human figure. She drew illustrations for the Archæologia, The Gentleman's Magazine, and other similar works. A print was published from a design by her, entitled ‘The Gardener's Girl,’ intended as a companion to Thomas Barker's ‘Woodboy.’ Her drawings were frequently in private collections.

Her devotion to her art took a toll on her health. The death of her eldest son gave her a shock from which she never recovered. She died on 22 September 1815 and was buried in the churchyard of St. Peter in Eastgate, Lincoln.
