= John Veevers =

- Born: 13 October 1930; New South Wales, Australia
- Died: 12 August 2018 (aged 87); Sydney
- Education: Newington College; University of Sydney; Imperial College London
- Occupations: Emeritus professor department of earth and planetary sciences
- Website: Macquarie University

John James Veevers (13 October 1930 – 12 August 2018) was an Australian professor of geology and a fellow of the Australian Academy of Science.

== Education ==
Veevers is the son of George Stanley Veevers and Dulcie Annie (née James) and attended Newington College (1944–1947). In 1946 he won the Wigram Allen Scholarship, endowed by Sir George Wigram Allen, for General Proficiency. At the end of 1947, Veevers was named Dux of the College and received the Schofield Scholarship and Halse Rogers Prize. He went up to the University of Sydney and graduated as a Bachelor of Science in 1952 and a Master of Science in 1954.

== Academic career ==
Veevers was a cadet geologist at the Bureau of Mineral Resources, Geology and Geophysics, Canberra, (1948–1951), rising to geologist (1952–1960) and senior geologist 1961–1967. In 1968, he was appointed as a senior lecturer at Macquarie University and has since been a Professor of the Department of Earth and Planetary Sciences. He was awarded his PhD in 1956 from Imperial College London.

== Publications ==
Veevers' multiple publications are held by the National Library of Australia.

== Honours ==
- Veevers crater – Named in his honour (1975)
- S W Carey Medal – Geological Society of Australia (1992)
- Centenary Medal – For service to Australian society and science in earth history (2001)
