= Phillip Carter =

Phillip or Phil Carter may refer to:

- Phil Carter (born 1975), American deputy assistant secretary of defense for detainee affairs
- Phillip Carter (businessman) (1962–2007), British founder of Carter & Carter
- Phillip Carter (ambassador) (born 1959), U.S. ambassador to Côte d'Ivoire
- Phil Carter (Canadian football) (born 1959), Canadian football player

== See also ==
- Philip Carter (1927–2015), businessman
