= Nick Carter (disambiguation) =

Nick Carter (born 1980) is an American singer who is a member of the Backstreet Boys.

Nick or Nicholas Carter may also refer to:

== People with the name ==
=== Athletes ===
- Nick Carter (baseball) (1879–1961), American baseball pitcher
- Nick Carter (cyclist) (1924–2003), New Zealand cyclist who competed in the 1948 Summer Olympics
- Nick Carter (footballer) (born 1978), Australian rules footballer
- Nick Carter (runner) (1902–1997), American track and field athlete who competed in the 1928 Summer Olympics
- Nick Carter (tennis) (1918–1989), American tennis player
- Nicholas Carter (cricketer) (born 1978), English cricketer

=== Musicians ===
- Murs (rapper) (Nick Carter, born 1978), American rapper
- Nicholas Carter (conductor), chief opera conductor at the Bern Theatre

=== Others ===
- Nick Carter (British Army officer) (born 1959), British former Chief of the Defence Staff
- Nick Carter (environmentalist) (died 2000), Zambian environmentalist
- Nick Carter (politician), Wales politician

== Fictional characters ==
- Nick Carter (character), fictional detective
  - Nick Carter (1964–1990 novel series)
  - Nick Carter, Master Detective, radio series
  - Nick Carter (comic strip), a 1972 Italian comic strip
