= Michael Carter =

Michael or Mike Carter may refer to:

== People ==
=== Arts, entertainment, and media ===
- Michael Carter (actor) (born 1947), Scottish film actor
- Michael Carter (musician), country music guitarist and songwriter
- Michael Carter (poet), American poet and publisher
- Michael A. Carter (died 2004), British sound engineer

=== Politics ===
- Michael Carter (Irish politician) (died 1954), Irish Farmers' Party politician for Leitrim Sligo in 1927
- Mike Carter (politician) (1953–2021), American politician
- Michael Carter (Colorado politician)

=== Sports ===
==== Gridiron football ====
- Michael Carter (Canadian football) (born 1986), Canadian football defensive back
- Michael Carter (nose tackle) (born 1960), American football player and track & field athlete
- Michael Carter (running back) (born 1999), American football running back
- Michael Carter II (born 1999), American football safety
- Mike Carter (American football) (born 1948), American football wide receiver

==== Other sports ====
- Michael Carter (boxer) (born 1949), British Olympic boxer
- Michael Carter (cyclist) (born 1963), American cyclist
- Michael Carter (footballer, born 1960) (1960–2018), English football winger
- Michael Carter (footballer, born 1980), English football forward
- Mike Carter (basketball) (1955–2026), American-Israeli basketball player
- Michael Carter-Williams (born 1991), American basketball player

=== Other people ===
- Michael Carter (entrepreneur) (born 1985), tech entrepreneur and computer programmer
- Michael G. Carter (born 1939), linguist

== Fictional characters ==
- Michael Jon Carter, secret identity of DC Comics superhero Booster Gold
- Mike Carter (Home and Away), a fictional character on the Australian soap opera

== See also ==
- Mick Carter, character from EastEnders
- Dwayne Michael Carter Jr. or Lil Wayne (born 1982), American hip hop recording artist
