= James Carter (footballer) =

English footballer

James Carter was an English footballer who played as a goalkeeper and was active at the turn of the 20th century. Born in Preston, he made a total of 43 appearances in The Football League for Blackburn Rovers from 1897 to 1899.
