= Neil Carter =

Neil or Neal Carter may refer to:

- Neil Carter (cricketer) (born 1975), South African cricketer
- Neil Carter (musician) (born 1958), former rhythm guitarist and keyboardist for the British rock band UFO and guitarist Gary Moore
- Neil Carter (political scientist), British social scientist at the University of York
- Neil Carter (The Archers), a character from the British radio soap opera The Archers
- Neal Carter (politician), American politician
- Neal Carter (mountaineer), (1902–1978), Canadian marine biologist and mountaineer
