= Herbert Carter =

Herbert Carter may refer to:

- Herbert Carter (pilot) (1919–2012), member of the Tuskegee Airmen
- Herbert Augustine Carter (1874–1916), English recipient of the Victoria Cross
- Herbert Dyson Carter (1910–1996), Canadian scientist, writer, and Communist propagandist and organiser
- H. E. Carter (Herbert Edmund Carter, 1910–2007), American biochemist and educator
- Herbert James Carter (1858–1940), English-born Australian schoolmaster and entomologist
- Herbert S. Carter (1869–1927), American physician and writer
- Herbert St Maur Carter (1878–1957), Irish-born British military officer, doctor and surgeon
- St George Henry Rathborne (1854–1938), wrote under the pseudonym Herbert Carter
