= Wally Carter (footballer, born 1898) =

Australian rules footballer

Personal information
- Full name: Joseph Wallace Carter
- Born: 11 June 1898; Brunswick, Victoria
- Died: 7 July 1970 (aged 72); Blackburn, Victoria
- Original team: Oakleigh

Playing career^{1}
Years	Club	Games (Goals)
1923–24	Melbourne	5 (1)
- ^{1} Playing statistics correct to the end of 1924.

Joseph Wallace Carter (11 June 1898 – 7 July 1970) was an Australian rules footballer who played with Melbourne in the Victorian Football League (VFL).
