= Jill Carter-Hansen =

New Zealand artist and photographer (1941)

Jill Carter-Hansen (née Carter, born 1941) is a New Zealand-born illustrator, author and filmmaker based in Sydney, Australia. Some of her artwork is held in the permanent collection of Museum of New Zealand Te Papa Tongarewa and Auckland Art Gallery Toi o Tāmaki.

== Biography ==
Carter-Hansen was born in 1941. She studied art at Elam School of Fine Arts for three years from the age of 17 to 20, then travelled to Europe. On her return she enrolled for a bachelor of fine arts degree in photography and printmaking at the University of Auckland, studying under Colin McCahon and graduating in 1986.

After graduation, Carter-Hansen exhibited in solo and group shows in Auckland and taught painting, drawing and design, as well as freelancing in photo-journalism. She also worked in design, designing posters and cards for environmental and peace organisations.

In 1987 she moved to Sydney, Australia. She freelanced as a children's book illustrator and photographer and tutored at tertiary art institutes and universities. In 1990 she completed a certificate in animation and began creating short films. In 1996 she completed a master of fine arts degree at Western Sydney University.

Carter-Hansen's work has attracted a number of nominations and awards. Her first children's book, The Elegant Elephant, was a finalist for the Lothian Unpublished Children's Fiction Award. In 2016 and 2018, her work won the Don Banks Short Fiction Award.

=== Publications ===
- The Elegant Elephant, 1990 (writer and illustrator), Hodder & Stoughton
- The Lonely Gnu, 1991 (writer and illustrator), Random House
- Zoe's Zoo, 1992 (writer and illustrator), Hodder & Stoughton
- Bearly There, 2012 (illustrator), Windy Hollow Books

=== Filmography ===
- The Messenger, 1991, Visionary Films
- Songs of the Immigrant Bride, 1995, Visionary Films
- Eclipse, 1999, Visionary Films
