= Edmund Carter (cricketer, born 1785) =

English cricketer

Edmund Carter (born 5 June 1785) was an English professional cricketer who made 11 known appearances in important matches from 1809 to 1816.

He was mainly associated with Marylebone Cricket Club (MCC) and he played for Hampshire in 1816.
