= Ming Veevers-Carter =

Ming Veevers-Carter is a florist and author, who represented New Covent Garden Market at the 2016 Chelsea Flower Show. She designed a floral portrait of the Queen which was the centrepiece of 10,000 flowers and foliage stems in a display called "Behind Every Great Florist". Photographs of this with the Queen appeared in the press, and the display won a gold medal and the Royal Horticultural Society's New Design award. Veevers-Carter's creates floral installations for events at places such as the National Gallery, Saatchi Gallery, Tate Modern and Victoria and Albert Museum. She is also an author, and wrote Celebration Flowers: Designing & Arranging (1990), as well as a number of other books on flower arranging.

== Life ==
Veevers-Carter was born in the Seychelles, and lived there for nine years. Her parents were Mark and Wendy Veevers-Carter. She represented New Covent Garden Market at the 2016 Chelsea Flower Show. She designed a floral portrait of the Queen which was the centrepiece of 10,000 flowers and foliage stems in a display called "Behind Every Great Florist". Photographs of this with the Queen appeared in the press, and the display won a gold medal and the Royal Horticultural Society's New Design award.

Veevers-Carter established her eponymous company in 1986, which then became a part of the Event Concept Group in 2017. Her work now focusses on creating floral installations for events at places such as the National Gallery, Saatchi Gallery, Tate Modern and Victoria and Albert Museum. These are large floral displays built on armatures. Florist Robbie Honey was one of Veever-Carter's students.

Veevers-Carter wrote Celebration Flowers: Designing & Arranging (1990), which Library Journal called a "useful as an idea book and as a guide to the techniques and materials used in flower arranging." She has written a number of other flower arranging books.

== Selected bibliography ==
1990 - Celebration Flowers: Designing & Arranging. Sterling Publishing, New York. ISBN 9780806973005

1990 - Festive Decorations: Over 80 Decorative Ideas for Flowers, Wreaths, and Trees. Sterling Publishing, New York. ISBN 9780806974743

1990 - Decorating with Nature: Trees, Wreaths, Garlands & Arrangements for a Beautiful Home. Merehurst, London. ISBN 9781853910708

1993 - 200 Easy Flower Arrangements. With Jane Newdick. Premier Editions, London. ISBN 9781897730157

1994 - Step by Step Art of Dried Flowers. Whitecap, B.C. ISBN 9781551100746

1995 - Dried Flower Arranging. Coombe Books, Bristol. ISBN 9781858138299

1998 - The Complete Flower Arranger. With Jane Newdick. Quadrillion Publishing. New York. ISBN 9781858333090
