= Raymond Carter (Missouri politician) =

American politician, lawyer, and teacher

D. Raymond Carter (August 13, 1905 – July 22, 1968) was an American Republican politician, lawyer, and teacher who has served in the Missouri General Assembly in the Missouri Senate from 1941 until 1944 and the Missouri House of Representatives from 1937 until 1940.

Carter was educated at Seymour high school, Southwest Missouri State Teacher's College, and the University of Missouri School of Law.

Carter married Ethel Frances Monville on June 20, 1933. He died in 1968 and was buried at Seymour Masonic Cemetery in Webster County, Missouri. His wife later married Donovan Walker Owensby who also graduated from the University of Missouri School of Law; she died in the year 2002.
