= Melvin Carter =

Melvin Carter may refer to:

- Melvin Carter (politician) (born 1979), first African-American mayor of St. Paul, Minnesota
- Melvin Carter (criminal), serial rapist in California
- Melvin G. Carter (born c. 1965), United States Marine Corps general
