= Geoff Carter =

English footballer (1943–2018)

Personal information
- Full name: Geoffrey Carter
- Date of birth: 14 February 1943
- Place of birth: Northwich, England
- Date of death: 19 March 2018 (aged 75)
- Place of death: Sandwell, England
- Position: Winger

Youth career
- Moulton

Senior career*
Years	Team	Apps	(Gls)
1960–1966	West Bromwich Albion	25	(3)
1966–1967	Bury	4	(0)
1967	Bradford City	1	(0)
- Darlaston Town
- Parkdale
- Greaves
Total		30	(3)
- * Club domestic league appearances and goals

Geoffrey Carter (14 February 1943 – 19 March 2018) was an English professional footballer who played as a winger.

== Career ==
Born in Northwich, Carter played for Moulton, West Bromwich Albion, Bury, Bradford City, Darlaston Town, Parkdale, and Greaves.

He played for Bradford City between August 1967 and September 1967, making 1 appearance in the Football League.

He died in March 2018, after suffering from leukemia and a stroke.
