= Joseph C. Carter =

United States Army general

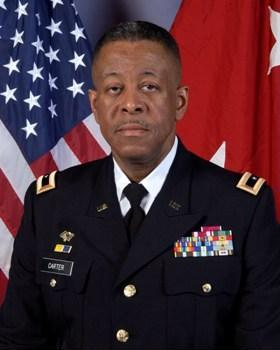
- Brigadier General Joseph C. Carter
- Born: Oak Bluffs, Martha's Vineyard, Massachusetts, United States
- Military career
- Allegiance: United States of America
- Branch: United States of America
- Service years: 1974-2012
- Rank: Brigadier General
- Unit: Massachusetts National Guard
- Commands: Army National Guard Training Site at the Massachusetts Military Reservation, Camp Edwards, Massachusetts
- Awards: Legion of Merit; Meritorious Service Medal; Army Commendation Medal; Army Achievement Medal (with 2 Bronze Oak Leaf Clusters); Army Reserve Component Achievement Medal (with 1 Silver Oak Leaf Cluster and 3 Bronze Oak Leaf Clusters); National Defense Service Medal (with Bronze Star Device); Humanitarian Service Medal; Armed Forces Reserve Medal (with Gold Hourglass Device); Army Service Ribbon

Joseph C. Carter is a retired Brigadier General (BG) who was the Adjutant General (TAG) of the Massachusetts National Guard from 2007 - 2012. He is the former chief of the Massachusetts Bay Transportation Authority Police. He currently lives in Oak Bluffs, Massachusetts with his wife Rae, an Oak Bluffs School teacher, and his daughter Emily.

== Law enforcement career ==
Joseph C. Carter began his career in law enforcement in 1974 working for the City of Boston Penal Institutions Department from 1975 through 1978. In 1978 he joined the Boston Police Department where his positions including patrol officer, detective, patrol supervisor, Deputy Superintendent, Superintendent, Chief of Staff of the department and Chief Administrative Hearing Officer, presiding over all departmental disciplinary trial boards. In 1998 he took the position of Chief of Police in his home town of Oak Bluffs, Massachusetts, and held the position for 5 years. From 2003 through 2007 he served as the head of Massachusetts Bay Transportation Authority Police, leaving the job in September 2007 to take the full-time Adjutant General's position in the state's National Guard.

=== Awards ===
- American Public Transportation Association's (APTA) Innovation in Government Award – the only law enforcement recipient.
- Webber-Seavey Award for Excellence in Law Enforcement (Semi-Finalist and thus one of the top 25 programs in the world), sponsored by the International Association of Chiefs of Police (IACP).
- Massachusetts Performance Recognition Award, which recognized three Transit Police Initiatives.
- Honored for his "outstanding leadership in law enforcement and his groundbreaking achievements in military service" by the Museum of African American History.

=== Special positions held ===
- Member of the U.S. Department of Justice's Anti-Terrorism and Joint-Terrorism Task Force [ATTF/JTTF] (MA).
- Member of the Municipal Police Training Committee, the Urban Crime Strategies Subcommittee of the Governor's Commission on Criminal Justice Innovation, and the Children's Trust Fund.
- Member of the board of the Massachusetts Police Accreditation Commission, Inc., and New England Chiefs of Police Association.
- 2005-2006 First Vice President, International Association of Chiefs of Police
- 2006-2007 President of the International Association of Chiefs of Police.
- 1998–present Board member emeritus of the African American Heritage Trail History Project of Martha's Vineyard.

== Military career ==
Carter served in the United States Army Reserve and the National Guard from 1974 through 2012. In the Guard, he has held numerous positions including:

- Commander, Army National Guard Training Site at the Massachusetts Military Reservation, Camp Edwards, Massachusetts
- Assistant Adjutant General for the Joint Force Headquarters for the Massachusetts Army and Air National Guard.

In August 2007 it was announced that he had been selected by Massachusetts governor Deval Patrick to succeed Brigadier General Oliver Mason and become the first African-American TAG in the 370-year history the state's Guard. He took over the position on September 21, 2007, but was officially sworn into the job on October 26, 2007, by Governor Patrick at a ceremony conducted at the Massachusetts State House. During the ceremony Carter received a 13 gun howitzer salute from the 101st Field Artillery Regiment, and was awarded the Legion of Merit. During his tenure as TAG he received a state (but not federal) promotion to major general and Massachusetts has been twice recognized for excellence in Diversity and Equal Opportunity.

=== Suspension and retirement ===
On March 29, 2012, he was suspended with pay from the National Guard by Governor Patrick pending the outcome of an investigation into an allegation that he raped a servicewoman in his unit in 1984 during training at Eglin Air Force Base in Florida. The accusations resurfaced in 2010 during court martial proceedings against Lt. Col. Mark Murray who serves as the Massachusetts National Guard's JAG (Judge Advocate General’s Corps). Carter initiated court martial proceedings against Murray "after state and federal investigations uncovered a range of alleged improprieties, including misusing federal money, hiring a convicted felon to do legal work, and threatening a whistleblower" and after Murray refused to resign in lieu of court martial. During the court martial, Murray alleged that the charges against him were retaliation by Carter for his role as investigating officer when the charges were first raised two years after the alleged attack. The court martial found that Murray had "failed to comply with federal law in managing Guard funds", but they voted 3 to 2 to allow Murray to retain his job. After the verdict, Murray was stripped of most of his responsibilities. It was alleged that Carter also retaliated against two of the judges in that court martial by trying to have them forced out because he was not happy with the verdict. Further investigation into the rape accusations was in part the result of a background check required for Carter's federal promotion to major general. The promotion "must be approved by the Army and confirmed by the US Senate".

During the investigation, Carter alleged that the rape charges against him are part of a long-running smear campaign against him. He states that the accusations are the result of his efforts to change a law that made firing certain state military division employees impossible without a court martial. He also claims senior officials were also angry with him for changing the National Guard's work week from a ten-hour-a-day four-day-a-week work schedule to an eight-hour-a-day five-day-a-week work schedule.

Carter claimed he did not remember the soldier who made the accusations and had "categorically denied the allegation". Carter also claimed to have not known of the allegations until they were raised during the 2010 court martial. This is in contrast to a statement by Murray who claims Carter was questioned during the investigation about the incident and stated "Well I hope this doesn't impact me some time in my future." Part of Carter's denial was also contradicted by his former company commander who stated he recalled the night in question and remembered Carter helping the woman after a night of socializing. He stated that Carter and the victim got out of a car near the beach, and that Carter later returned alone.

On April 3, 2012, Governor Patrick selected Massachusetts Air National Guard Major General L. Scott Rice to serve as acting Adjutant General during Carter's suspension.

On September 19, 2012, BG Carter agreed to retire from the Massachusetts National Guard after a report from military investigators that "found probable cause that he indecently assaulted a subordinate while the two were on a training exercise in Florida in 1984". Investigators stated that they did not find evidence to substantiate a charge of rape, but concluded that "he probably touched her inappropriately, engaged in conduct unbecoming of an officer, and later made false claims about the incident". Carter released a statement stating that he was "vindicated because the Army did not deem the most serious allegation against me to be credible" but was "disappointed that the Army has found probable cause for other alleged offenses. I never assaulted anyone, and I cooperated fully with CID's investigation and told the truth". He further stated that he was retiring to prevent the "unfounded allegations" from becoming a distraction to the National Guard. After leaving the military, Carter became a strategic advisor to the head of Boston's Windwalker Group, LLC. Windwalker provides physical and cybersecurity training and services to corporate and government clients.

== Education ==
=== Civilian ===
Carter holds a bachelor's degree in Organizational Behavior and Management from Lesley College and Master of Arts degree in Criminal Justice Administration from Atlanta University.

=== Military ===
Carter is a 1992 graduate of the U.S. Army Command and General Staff College and a 2002 graduate of US Army War College obtaining a Master of Strategic studies degree.

=== Law enforcement ===
Carter is a graduate of the FBI National Academy 140th Session; a 1986 graduate of the Police Executive Research Forum's Senior Management Institute for Police; a 1991 graduate of the ABA's National Judicial College - Administrative Law Judge course; as well as a graduate of numerous other federal, state and military law enforcement programs.

== See also ==
- Adjutant General of Massachusetts
- National Guard of the United States

Preceded by BG Oliver Mason	Adjutant General (TAG) - Massachusetts National Guard; 2007-2012	Succeeded by Major General L. Scott Rice (acting)
Preceded by Mary Ann Viverette	President - International Association of Chiefs of Police; 2006-2007	Succeeded by Ronald Ruecker
Preceded by William Fleming (acting - chief)	Chief of Police - Massachusetts Bay Transportation Authority Police; 2003-2007	Succeeded by Paul MacMillan
Preceded by N/A	Chief of Police - Oak Bluffs, Massachusetts; 1998-2003	Succeeded by Erik G. Blake
