= Hazel Carter (writer) =

American soldier (1894–1918)

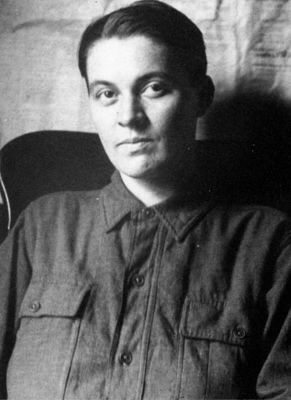
- Carter circa 1918
- Born: Hazel Blauser; 1894
- Died: July 12, 1918 (aged 23–24); Lordsburg, New Mexico
- Spouse: John J. Carter
- Military career
- Allegiance: United States
- Branch: United States Army
- Service years: 1918
- Unit: 18th Infantry

Hazel Carter (1894–1918) was an American farmer who attempted to disguise herself as a serving soldier.

== Early life ==
Carter was born in 1894 in the Huachuca Mountains outside of Douglas, Arizona Territory. She was known as a skilled hunter and farmer. According to her father Peter Blauser, Carter graduated from college but chose to live a life on a ranch where she tended to 200 cattle and 16 saddle horses. She married John J. Carter on December 12, 1916.

== World War I involvement ==
When her husband was sent to France on the first American contingent to fight in World War I, she first tried to join the Red Cross in Douglas, but was not accepted. Carter then cut her hair short and stole an Army uniform. She boarded the same train as the one carrying her husband and went undetected for two days when she was forced off the train and told to go back to Douglas. However, she got back on the train. At the port, she was able to get onto a ship and stow away. Carter claims her husband did not know of her presence on the train until they neared Chicago. The contingent was five days at sea when her identity was revealed. Her voice was what eventually gave her away and Captain Eugene D. Rideout realized that she was a woman. Upon arrival on the shores of Europe, she was not permitted to disembark from the ship's deck.

A request by Carter to remain as a nurse was refused. Her husband was demoted from corporal to private as a result of the debacle. Carter states that her mother did not know she was stowing away. Carter's American Civil War veteran grandfather, H. Clark remarked how proud he was of his granddaughter, stating "I knew she would do it…That girl sure has grit. I wish she could stay and fight the Germans. You ought to have seen her in uniform. She made a better looking soldier than John, I do believe. She can handle a rifle better than most men. They sure should have let her stay."

On return, she was detained and questioned at the police headquarters in Hoboken, New Jersey. She then moved on to Atlantic City, New Jersey. A hero's welcome was planned for her return to Douglas. Carter was met by a brass band and supporters. She also wrote about her experiences and her account was published by The Bell Syndicate. Carter authored a series of four articles detailing her experience that were serialized nationally by several newspaper companies.

== Death ==
Before her death, she intended on earning enough money to return to France to serve as an Army nurse. Carter died in Lordsburg, New Mexico, on July 11, 1918, after being ill for two days. Her husband was still fighting overseas when she died. It was said by friends that her health declined after her return and they believed she died of a "broken heart." Carter's body was returned to Douglas for burial and she was given a military funeral with a military chaplain and six soldiers as pallbearers. In a newspaper report of the funeral, it was said that Carter's was the first military funeral held in the United States for a woman.
