= 1835 in Scotland =

- Centuries: 17th; 18th; 19th; 20th; 21st
- Decades: 1810s; 1820s; 1830s; 1840s; 1850s
- See also: List of years in Scotland; Timeline of Scottish history 1835 in: The UK • Wales • Elsewhere

Events from the year 1835 in Scotland.

== Incumbents ==
=== Law officers ===
- Lord Advocate – Sir William Rae, Bt until April; then John Murray
- Solicitor General for Scotland – Duncan McNeill; then John Cunninghame

=== Judiciary ===
- Lord President of the Court of Session – Lord Granton
- Lord Justice General – The Duke of Montrose
- Lord Justice Clerk – Lord Boyle

== Events ==
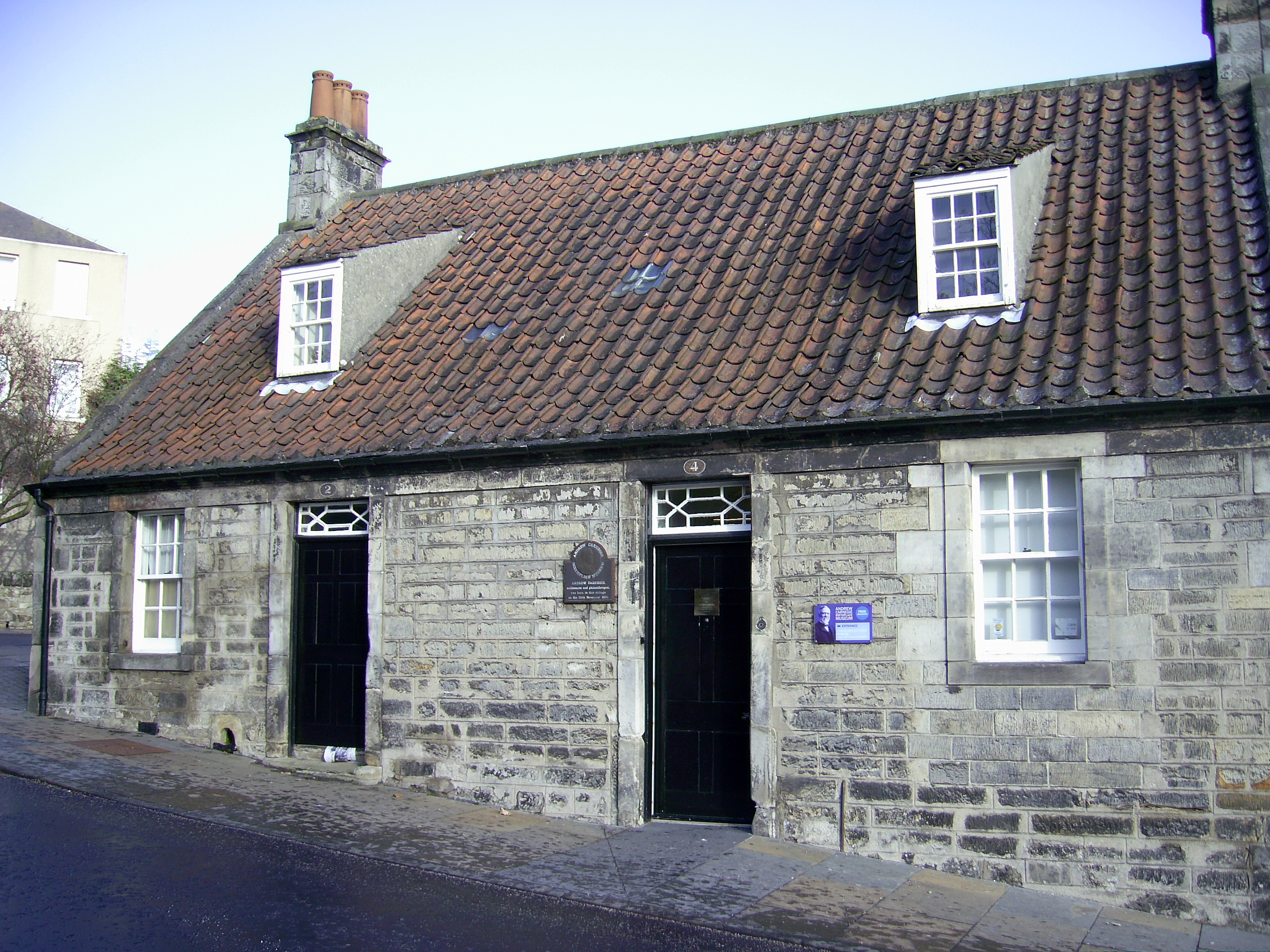
Birthplace of Andrew Carnegie in Dunfermline

- 21 January – Airdrie Savings Bank opens its doors to business; it will remain as an independent trustee savings bank until 2017.
- 29 May – the General Assembly of the Church of Scotland confirms the Veto Act which allows a majority of heads of families to exclude a presentee from a parish, legislation which is subsequently ruled as invalid.
- 3 July – Slamannan Railway authorised.
- 21 July – Paisley and Renfrew Railway authorised.
- Alloa Coal Company established as a partnership by William Mitchell and others to work coal pits in Clackmannanshire.
- Roderick Murchison names the Silurian period in geology.
- An edition of the Chronicle of Melrose edited by Joseph Stevenson is published in Edinburgh for the Bannatyne Club.

== Births ==
- 28 January – Robert Herbert Story, minister of the Church of Scotland and Principal of the University of Glasgow (died 1907)
- February – James Davis, soldier, recipient of the Victoria Cross (died 1893)
- 9 February – John Malcolmson, soldier, recipient of the Victoria Cross (died 1902 in London)
- 3 March – William Fraser Rae, journalist and author (died 1905 in England)
- 19 March – Edmund Montgomery, philosopher, scientist and physician (died 1911 in the United States)
- 29 March
  - Madeleine Smith, accused in a murder trial (died 1928 in the United States)
  - James Taylor, tea planter (died 1892 in Ceylon)
- 5 April – Donald Cameron, 24th Lochiel, diplomat and Conservative politician (died 1905)
- 3 May – Edward Hargitt, ornithologist and landscape painter (died 1895)
- 18 May – Sir Fitzroy Maclean, 10th Baronet, soldier and clan chief (died 1936)
- 28 May – James Small, laird (died 1900)
- 17 June – James Brunton Stephens, poet (died 1902 in Australia)
- 20 June – Andrew Tennant, pastoralist (died 1913 in Australia)
- 10 July – William Baxter Collier Fyfe, genre and portrait painter (died 1882 in London)
- 11 July – John Macvicar Anderson, architect (died 1915 in London)
- 15 July – Louisa Stevenson, campaigner for women's rights (died 1908)
- 21 July – Robert Munro, archaeologist (died 1920)
- 27 July – William Boyd Stewart, minister of the Baptist church and educationalist (died 1912 in Canada)
- 18 August – Robert Murdoch Smith, military engineer, archaeologist and diplomat (died 1900)
- 5 September – Thomas Cadell, soldier, recipient of the Victoria Cross (died 1919)
- 2 October – James Stirling, steam locomotive engineer (died 1917 in Ashford, Kent)
- 25 October – William McTaggart, marine painter (died 1910)
- 15 November – Archibald Scott Cleghorn, businessman who marries into the royal family of Hawaii (died 1910 in Hawaii)
- 25 November – Andrew Carnegie, steel magnate and philanthropist (died 1919 in the United States)
- 13 December – Archibald Hamilton Charteris, minister of the Church of Scotland and theologian (died 1906)
- 28 December – Archibald Geikie, geologist (died 1924 in England)
- James Park, soldier, recipient of the Victoria Cross (killed in action 1858 in India)
- Approximate date – Ellen Johnston, "the factory girl", power loom weaver and poet (died 1874)

== Deaths ==
- 14 April – Joseph Grant, poet (born 1805)
- 5 June – Sir William Honyman, Lord Armadale, landowner and judge (born 1756)
- 5 August – Thomas M'Crie the elder, minister of the church and historian (born 1772)
- 16 September – Henry Belfrage, minister of the Secession church (born 1774)
- 2 October – John Mackay Wilson, writer (born 1804)
- 1 November – William Motherwell, poet (born 1797)
- 9 November – Michael Scott, author and autobiographer who wrote under the pseudonym Tom Cringle (born 1789)
- 21 November – James Hogg, "the Ettrick shepherd", poet and novelist (born 1770)
- 21 December – Sir John Sinclair, 1st Baronet, agriculturalist, politician, economist and statistician (born 1754)

== The arts ==
- 26 September – première of Donizetti's opera Lucia di Lammermoor in Naples.
- 30 December – première of Donizetti's opera Maria Stuarda at La Scala in Milan.
- Hugh Miller publishes Scenes and Legends in the North of Scotland.

== See also ==
- 1835 in Ireland
