= 1824 in Scotland =

- Centuries: 17th; 18th; 19th; 20th; 21st
- Decades: 1800s; 1810s; 1820s; 1830s; 1840s
- See also: List of years in Scotland; Timeline of Scottish history 1824 in: The UK • Wales • Elsewhere

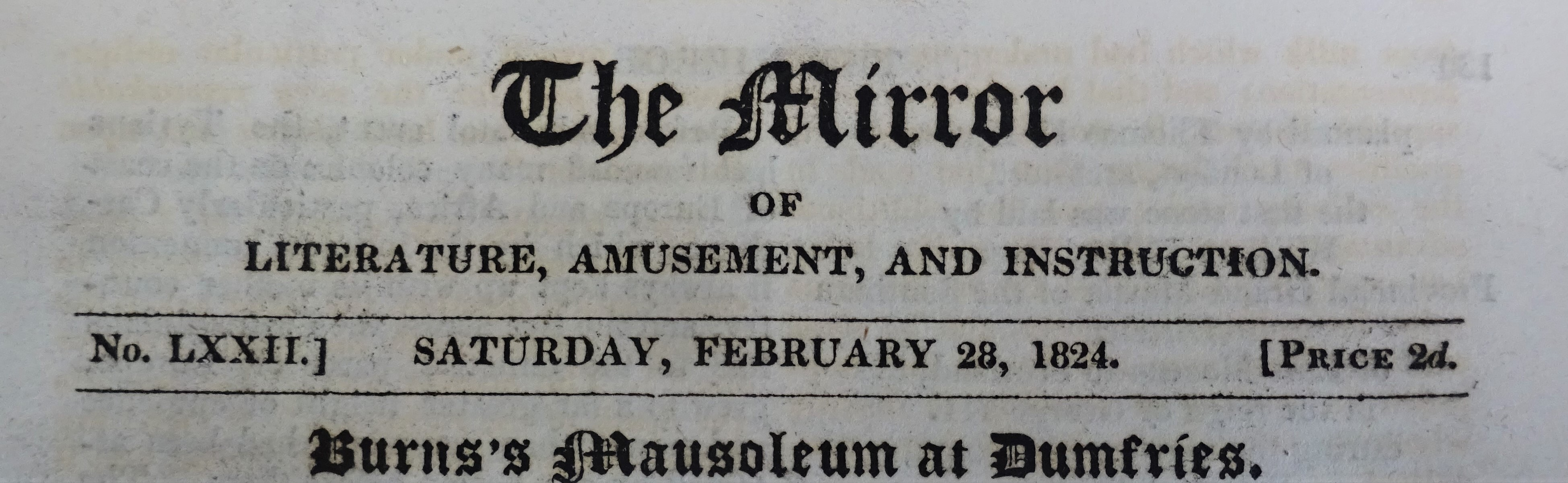
Burns's Mausoleum in Dumfries 1824. The Mirror. Title.

Events from the year 1824 in Scotland.

== Incumbents ==
=== Law officers ===
- Lord Advocate – Sir William Rae, Bt
- Solicitor General for Scotland – John Hope

=== Judiciary ===
- Lord President of the Court of Session – Lord Granton
- Lord Justice General – The Duke of Montrose
- Lord Justice Clerk – Lord Boyle

== Events ==
- 19 April – brigantine Helen of Dundee, bound for Quebec, founders on what becomes known as Helen's Reef off Rockall with fatalities.
- 17 May – the Monkland and Kirkintilloch Railway is authorised; construction begins the following month.
- 24 May – the foundation stone for an oil-gas works at Tanfield in Edinburgh is laid by Sir Walter Scott as company chairman.
- October – Edinburgh Academy, built to the design of William Burn, opens.
- 10 October – Edinburgh Town Council makes a decision to found a municipal fire brigade under James Braidwood, the first in Britain.
- 15–21 November – Great Fire of Edinburgh, starting in Old Assembly Close, kills 11 residents and 2 firemen, and destroys 24 tenements – leaving 400 families homeless – and other properties, including the spire of Tron Kirk.
- Blairquhan Castle near Maybole, rebuilt to the design of William Burn for Sir David Hunter-Blair, 3rd Baronet, is completed.
- Speyside Scotch whisky distilleries established: Balmenach, Glenlivet and Macallan. Also, Cameron Bridge distillery is established by Haig.
- The Foot-Ball Club is established in Edinburgh, one of the earliest known clubs organised to play any kind of football.
- The Northern Yacht Club, a predecessor of the Royal Northern and Clyde Yacht Club, is established in Rothesay.
- The Perth Golfing Society is formed.

== Births ==
- 24 February – John Dick Peddie, architect (died 1891)
- 8 March – John Elder, marine engineer (died 1869 in London)
- 21 March – James Samuel, railway engineer (died 1874 in London)
- 4 July – Robert B. Lindsay, Governor of Alabama (died 1902 in the United States)
- 21 October – John Ritchie Findlay, newspaper owner and philanthropist (died 1898)
- 10 December – George MacDonald, writer, poet and Christian minister (died 1905 in England)
- 17 December – John Kerr, physicist (died 1907)
- George Campbell, administrator in British India and Liberal politician (died 1892 in Cairo)

== Deaths ==
- 12 January – Walter Oudney, physician and explorer (born 1790; died in Africa)
- 15 January – Francis Dundas, British Army general and governor of Cape Colony (born c.1759)
- 17 January – James Brodie of Brodie, botanist, clan chief and politician (born 1744)
- 31 March – Andrew Fyfe, anatomist (born 1754)
- 15 May – Alexander Campbell, musician and writer (born 1764)
- 19 December – Charles Smith, painter (born 1749)
- Approximate date – John Gunn, musician (born c.1765)

== The arts ==
- Thomas Campbell's Miscellaneous Poems is published.
- James Hogg's novel The Private Memoirs and Confessions of a Justified Sinner is published anonymously.
- William Knox's poetry collection Songs of Israel is published.
- Sir Walter Scott's novel Redgauntlet is published anonymously.
- Edwin Landseer visits Scotland for the first time to paint a portrait of Sir Walter Scott; he will return annually, concentrating on animal portraits.

== See also ==
- 1824 in Ireland
