= 1819 in Scotland =

- Centuries: 17th; 18th; 19th; 20th; 21st
- Decades: 1790s; 1800s; 1810s; 1820s; 1830s
- See also: List of years in Scotland; Timeline of Scottish history 1819 in: The UK • England • Wales • Elsewhere

Events from the year 1819 in Scotland.

== Incumbents ==
=== Law officers ===
- Lord Advocate – Alexander Maconochie; then Sir William Rae, Bt
- Solicitor General for Scotland – James Wedderburn

=== Judiciary ===
- Lord President of the Court of Session – Lord Granton
- Lord Justice General – The Duke of Montrose
- Lord Justice Clerk – Lord Boyle

== Events ==
- 14 May – the first all iron-hulled vessel, the barge Vulcan, is launched on the Monkland Canal at Faskine, Airdrie for use as a horse-drawn passenger boat between Edinburgh and Glasgow on the Forth and Clyde Canal.
- 13 June – Highland Clearances: Strathnaver clearances resume on the estates of the Duke and Duchess of Sutherland, enforced by factor Patrick Sellar with burning of crofts.
- August – three ships set out from Oban carrying migrants to Canada.
- 17 August–1 October – English poet Robert Southey joins civil engineer Thomas Telford on a tour of his Scottish projects. A replacement Highbridge near Spean Bridge, designed by Telford, is built this year.
- 18 August – Regent Bridge, Edinburgh, opened.
- September – Thomas Chalmers becomes first minister of St John's Parish Church in Glasgow where he puts into practice his model evangelical ideas for alleviating the material and spiritual poverty generated by industrialisation by fostering independence through personal contact, parochial care and the establishment of schools.
- The publisher Collins is founded as a printer of religious literature in Glasgow by William Collins.
- W. & R. Chambers, established by Peebles-born bookseller brothers William Chambers and Robert Chambers in Edinburgh, begin publishing with a posthumous collection of The Songs of Robert Burns.
- The Ordnance Survey begins mapping in Scotland, in the south west, although this survey will be aborted.
- Brora distillery is established as "Clynelish" by the Marquess of Stafford at Brora.
- First pump room opened at the spa town of Strathpeffer.

== Births ==
- 22 January – Hugh McColl, pioneer of irrigation (died 1885 in Australia)
- 25 January – Gideon Lang, settler (died 1880 in Australia)
- 28 March – William Cross Yuille, settler (died 1894 in Australia)
- 10 April – James Logan, lawyer (died 1869 in Penang)
- 27 April – William Muir, Orientalist and colonial administrator (died 1905)
- 26 May – George Thomson, missionary and botanist (died 1878 in Cameroon)
- 2 July – George Young, Lord Young, judge (died 1907)
- 3 July – William Smith, Roman Catholic Archbishop of St Andrews and Edinburgh (died 1892)
- 14 July – Benjamin Blyth, civil engineer (died 1866)
- 22 July – John Murdoch, evangelist and educationalist (died 1904 in India)
- 30 July – John Campbell Shairp, man of letters (died 1885)
- 2 August – William Walls, lawyer and industrialist (died 1893)
- 25 August – Allan Pinkerton, private detective (died 1884 in the United States)
- 3 September – Alexander Campbell Fraser, philosopher (died 1914)
- 7 September – Aeneas William Mackintosh, Liberal politician (died 1900)
- 6 November – Charles James Campbell, merchant and politician in Nova Scotia (died 1906 in Canada)
- 13 November – Peter Sinclair, farmer and politician in Prince Edward Island (died 1906 in Canada)
- 28 November – Walter Montgomerie Neilson, steam locomotive manufacturer (died 1889)
- James Cassie, painter (died 1879)
- James Miln, antiquary (died 1881)

== Deaths ==
- 14 February – William Ogilvie of Pittensear, classicist, numismatist and land reformer (born 1736)
- 12 March – Robert Watt, physician and bibliographer (born 1774)
- 17 June – Robert Dundas of Arniston, judge (born 1758)
- 20 July – John Playfair, natural philosopher (born 1748)
- 25 August – James Watt, inventor (born 1736; died in England)
- 15 December – Daniel Rutherford, physician, chemist and botanist (born 1749)

== The arts ==
- Walter Scott's novels Ivanhoe, The Bride of Lammermoor and A Legend of Montrose are published anonymously.
- The Harp of Caledonia: a collection of songs, ancient and modern, chiefly Scottish, compiled by John Struthers, is published in Glasgow; and The Harp of Renfrewshire: a collection of songs and other poetical pieces, compiled by William Motherwell, is published in Paisley (where Motherwell is appointed sheriff-clerk depute this year).

== See also ==
- Timeline of Scottish history
- 1819 in Ireland
- 1819 in the United Kingdom
- 1819 in Wales
