= 1757 in Scotland =

- Centuries: 16th; 17th; 18th; 19th; 20th
- Decades: 1730s; 1740s; 1750s; 1760s; 1770s
- See also: List of years in Scotland; Timeline of Scottish history 1757 in: Great Britain • Wales • Elsewhere

Events from the year 1757 in Scotland.

== Incumbents ==
=== Law officers ===
- Lord Advocate – Robert Dundas the younger
- Solicitor General for Scotland – Andrew Pringle of Alemore

=== Judiciary ===
- Lord President of the Court of Session – Lord Glendoick
- Lord Justice General – Lord Ilay
- Lord Justice Clerk – Lord Tinwald

== Events ==
- 77th Regiment of Foot (Montgomerie's Highlanders) raised as the First Highland Battalion by Maj. Archibald Montgomerie
- 78th Fraser Highlanders raised as the Second Highland Battalion.
- Macfarlane Observatory established at the University of Glasgow; its instruments are set up by James Watt in his new capacity as the university's instrument maker.
- Physician Francis Home publishes The Principles of Agriculture and Vegetation, an early presentation of the chemical principles underlying plant nutrition, in Edinburgh.
- Final rebuilding of Douglas Castle begins.
- Ossian's Hall of Mirrors, a folly at Dunkeld, is built.
- First lighthouse on Little Cumbrae is built.
- Main defences of Fort George completed.
- Robert Adam surveys the ruins of Diocletian's Palace at Spalato in Dalmatia.

== Births ==
- 27 February
  - Andrew Macdonald, Episcopal clergyman, poet and playwright (died 1790)
  - (baptised) – David Hume, advocate (died 1838)
- 4 March – George Thomson, musician and collector of traditional music (died 1851)
- April – John Clerk, Lord Eldin, judge (died 1832)
- 9 August – Thomas Telford, civil engineer (died 1834 in London)
- 20 October – Robert Kerr, surgeon and writer (died 1813)
- 13 November – Archibald Alison, Episcopal clergyman and essayist (died 1839)
- 6 December – Sir David Baird, 1st Baronet, general (died 1829)
- James Bonar, lawyer and astronomer (died 1821)
- Robert Brown, agriculturalist (died 1831)
- Andrew Mitchell, admiral (died 1806 in Bermuda)

== Deaths ==
- 19 January – Thomas Ruddiman, classical scholar, librarian and printer (born 1664)
- 20 January – Robert Keith, Episcopal bishop and historian (born 1681)
- 8 March – Thomas Blackwell, classical scholar (born 1701)

== The arts ==
- William Burness builds Burns Cottage in Alloway; his son, the national poet Robert Burns, will be born here in January 1759.

== See also ==
- Timeline of Scottish history
