= 1901 in Scotland =

- Centuries: 18th; 19th; 20th; 21st
- Decades: 1880s; 1890s; 1900s; 1910s; 1920s
- See also: List of years in Scotland; Timeline of Scottish history 1901 in: The UK • Wales • Elsewhere; Scottish football: 1900–01 • 1901–02

Events from the year 1901 in Scotland.

== Incumbents ==
- Secretary for Scotland and Keeper of the Great Seal – Lord Balfour of Burleigh

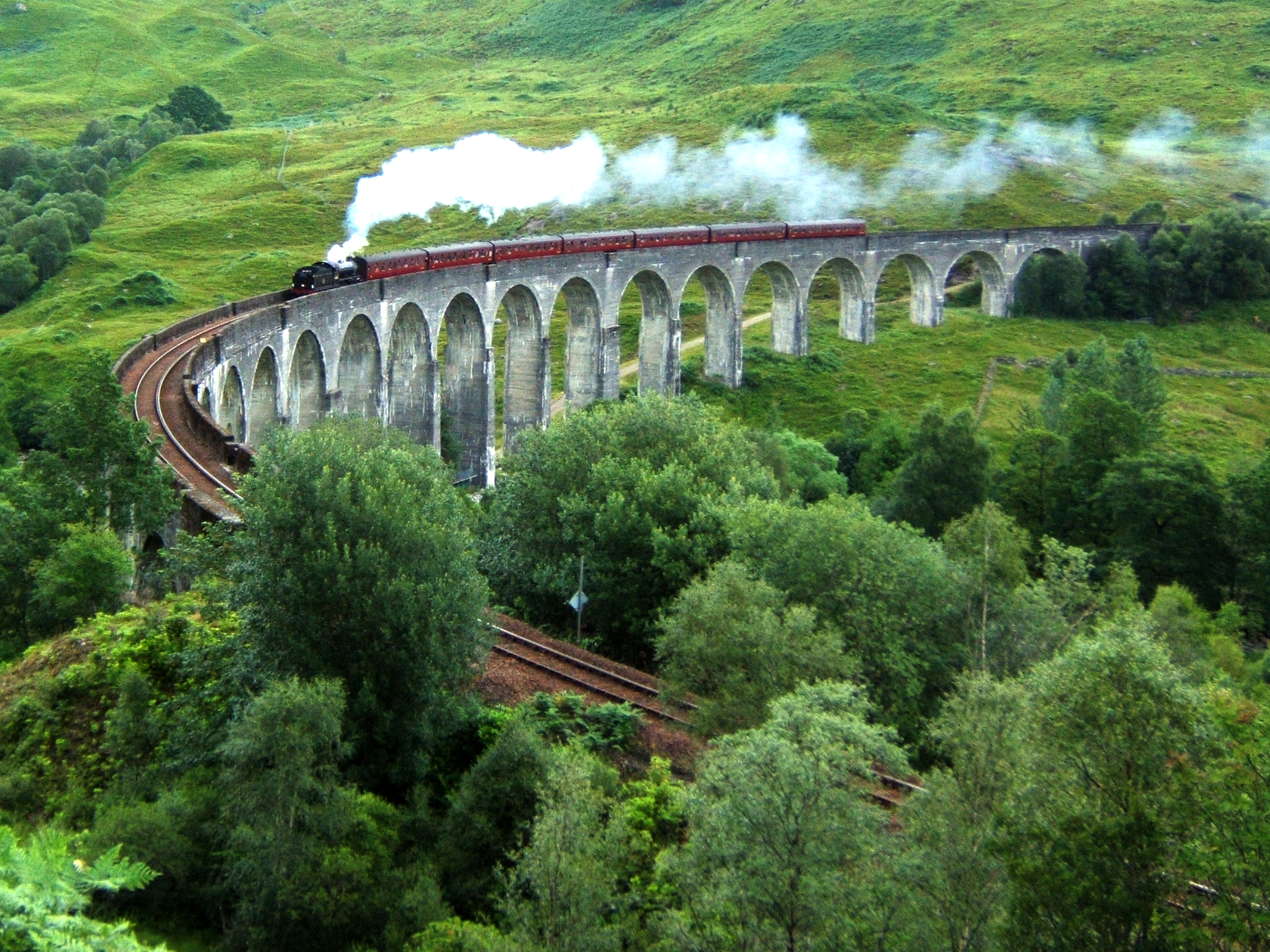
Glenfinnan Viaduct on the Mallaig Extension Railway, built by "Concrete Bob" McAlpine

=== Law officers ===
- Lord Advocate – Andrew Murray
- Solicitor General for Scotland – Charles Dickson

=== Judiciary ===
- Lord President of the Court of Session and Lord Justice General – Lord Blair Balfour
- Lord Justice Clerk – Lord Kingsburgh

== Events ==
- 21 March – SY Discovery (later named RRS Discovery) is formally launched in Dundee.
- 31 March – National census. 26% of the Scottish population live in Glasgow or Edinburgh.
- 1 April – the West Highland Railway's Mallaig Extension Railway, operated by the North British Railway, is opened throughout to Mallaig on the west coast.
- 16 May – TS King Edward is launched at William Denny and Brothers' shipyard in Dumbarton. The first commercial merchant vessel propelled by steam turbines, she enters excursion service on the Firth of Clyde on 1 July.
- 2 May–4 November: Glasgow International Exhibition.
- 6 June – Discovery leaves Dundee for London in preparation for its expedition south.
- 26 September – Ayr Corporation Tramways begin operation.
- The last resident family leaves the Shiant Isles for Harris.
- W. M. Gilbert's Edinburgh in the Nineteenth Century introduces the term "Royal Mile".
- The Scottish Prohibition Party is founded.
- The carbonated soft drink Irn-Bru is first produced as Iron Brew by A.G. Barr in Falkirk.

== Births ==
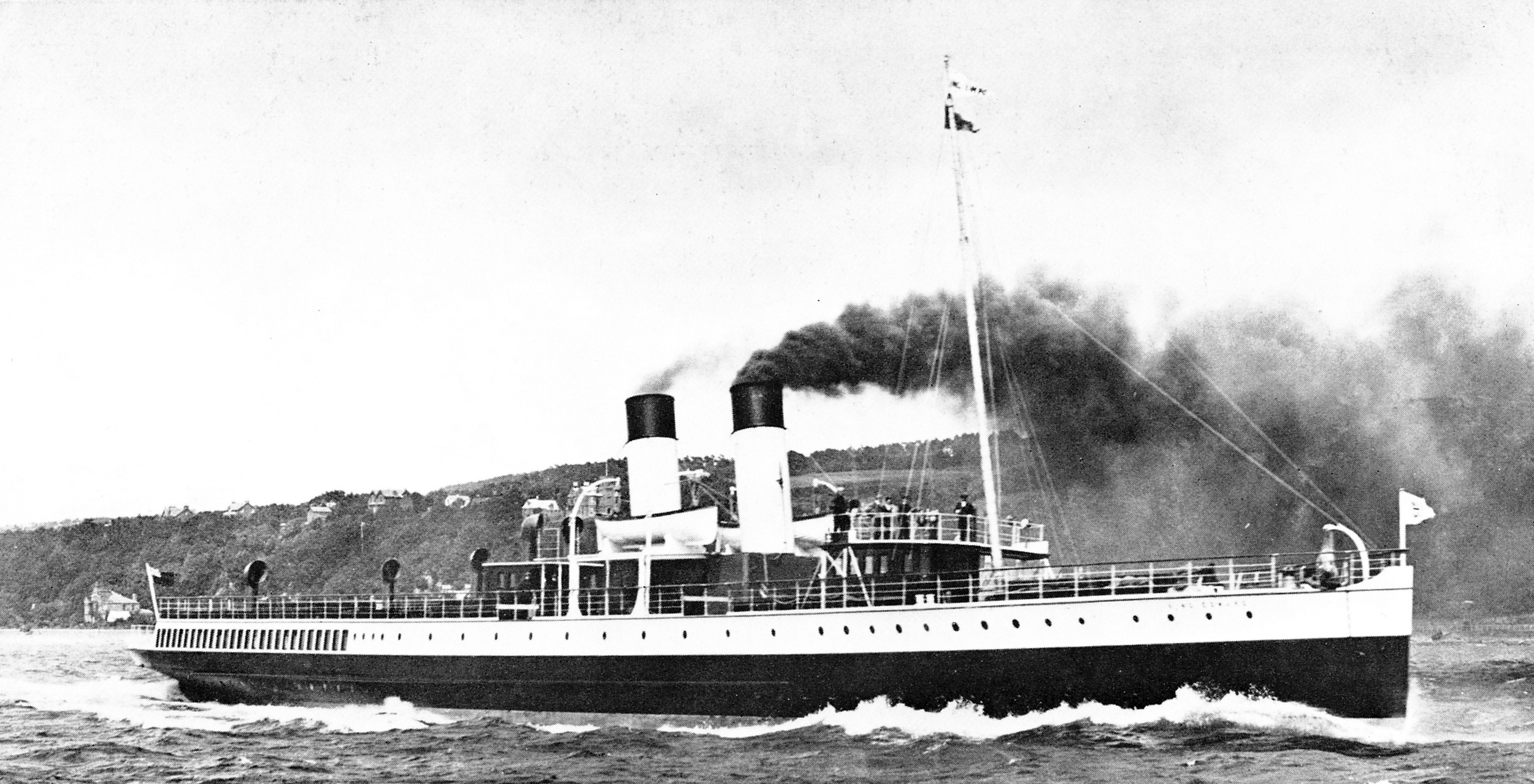
TS King Edward on trials

- 13 February – Lewis Grassic Gibbon, writer (died 1935)
- 15 February – Murdo Macfarlane, Gaelic bard (died 1982)
- 3 April – Charles Finnigan, dental surgeon, Honorary Dental Surgeon to Queen Elizabeth (died 1967)
- 18 May – Isabella Gordon, carcinologist (died 1988 in Carlisle)
- 29 June – Frieda Inescort, actress (died 1976 in Los Angeles)
- 17 August – Malcolm MacDonald, politician and diplomat (died in 1981 in Maidstone)
- 29 August – Anna Zinkeisen, artist (died 1976 in London)
- 1 September – John Bannerman, Baron Bannerman of Kildonan, farmer, rugby union international and Liberal politician (died 1969 in England)
- 22 September – George McKenzie, bantamweight boxer (died 1941)
- 24 October – Moultrie Kelsall, actor (died 1980)
- 1 December – Jane Gray, supercentenarian in Australia
- 11 December – Dave Halliday, footballer (died 1970)
- 13 December – Arthur Donaldson, leader of the Scottish National Party from 1960 to 1969 (died 1993)
- Cezaro Rossetti, Esperanto writer (died 1950)

== Deaths ==
- 15 January – John Burnet, architect (born 1814)
- 12 February – John Burns, 1st Baron Inverclyde, ship owner, chairman of the Cunard Line (born 1829)
- 19 February – Duncan Cameron, owner of The Oban Times, inventor of the Waverley Pen, (born 1825)
- 8 April – James Chalmers, missionary, murdered on Goaribari Island (born 1841)
- 12 April – Richard Henry Brunton, "Father of Japanese lighthouses" (born 1841)
- 10 May – Christian Maclagan, antiquary (born 1811)
- 4 July – Peter Guthrie Tait, mathematical physicist (born 1831)
- 26 December – Sir Joseph Noel Paton, artist (born 1821)

== The arts ==
- George Douglas Brown's realist novel The House with the Green Shutters is published under the name George Douglas.
- John Davidson, poet, publishes The Testament of a Vivisector and The Testament of a Man Forbid

== See also ==
- Timeline of Scottish history
- 1901 in Ireland
