= 1760 in Scotland =

- Centuries: 16th; 17th; 18th; 19th; 20th
- Decades: 1740s; 1750s; 1760s; 1770s; 1780s
- See also: List of years in Scotland; Timeline of Scottish history 1760 in: Great Britain • Wales • Elsewhere

Events from the year 1760 in Scotland.

== Incumbents ==
=== Law officers ===
- Lord Advocate – Robert Dundas the younger; then Thomas Miller of Glenlee
- Solicitor General for Scotland – James Montgomery jointly with Francis Garden

=== Judiciary ===
- Lord President of the Court of Session – Lord Glendoick until 10 March; then from 30 April Lord Arniston, the younger
- Lord Justice General – Lord Ilay
- Lord Justice Clerk – Lord Tinwald

== Events ==
- January – 88th Regiment of Foot (Highland Volunteers) raised at Stirling.
- 26 December – Carron Company produces its first cast iron at Falkirk.
- George Ross acquires Cromarty and begins the process of developing it as a planned town.
- Edinburgh City Chambers is opened as the Royal Exchange, to a design by John Adam.
- Construction of a new Glasgow town hall is completed.
- First wellhouse built at St Bernard's Well, Stockbridge, Edinburgh.
- The office of Regius Professor of Practical Astronomy in the University of Glasgow is established, with Alexander Wilson as first holder.

== Births ==
- 29 April? – Adam Gillies, Lord Gillies, judge (died 1842 in Leamington Spa)
- 3 September – James Wilson, weaver and revolutionary (executed 1820)
- 28 September – Gilbert Burns, farmer, brother of Robert Burns (died 1827)

== Deaths ==
- 11 October – Lord George Murray, Jacobite general (born 1694; died in Medemblik)
- Margaret McMurray, last known speaker of Galwegian Gaelic

== The arts ==
- June–October – James Macpherson is sponsored to make his first tour of the Higlands and Islands to seek out traditional Gaelic poetry, following his publication in Edinburgh of Fragments of Ancient Poetry collected in the Highlands of Scotland.
- 27 July? – the Trustees Drawing Academy of Edinburgh, predecessor of Edinburgh College of Art, is established.
- Approximate date – piper Joseph MacDonald’s Compleat Theory of the Scots Highland Bagpipe is written, the first study of the subject.

== See also ==
- Timeline of Scottish history
