= 1756 in Scotland =

- Centuries: 16th; 17th; 18th; 19th; 20th
- Decades: 1730s; 1740s; 1750s; 1760s; 1770s
- See also: List of years in Scotland; Timeline of Scottish history 1756 in: Great Britain • Wales • Elsewhere

Events from the year 1756 in Scotland.

== Incumbents ==
=== Law officers ===
- Lord Advocate – Robert Dundas the younger
- Solicitor General for Scotland – Andrew Pringle of Alemore

=== Judiciary ===
- Lord President of the Court of Session – Lord Glendoick
- Lord Justice General – Lord Ilay
- Lord Justice Clerk – Lord Tinwald

== Events ==
- 21 April – James Montgomery, a slave, escapes from a ship bound for Virginia at Port Glasgow and flees to Edinburgh where he is recaptured and begins the legal case of Montgomery v Sheddan in an attempt to gain his freedom.
- 1 November – Wanlockhead Miners' Library set up.
- A decision of the Court of Session (in Edinburgh) establishes that tenants may easily be removed by the local sheriff.
- The planned industrial village of Charlestown, Fife, is begun by Charles Bruce, 5th Earl of Elgin.
- Church of St Andrew's in the Square, Glasgow, designed by Allan Dreghorn, is completed.
- 73rd (Perthshire) Regiment of Foot first formed.
- Physician Francis Home publishes Experiments on Bleaching in Edinburgh.

== Births ==
- 4 January – Hugh Johnston, merchant and politician in New Brunswick (died 1829 in Canada)
- 4 March – Henry Raeburn, portrait painter (died 1823)
- 10 April – John West, mathematician (died 1817 in Jamaica)
- 31 May – James Currie, physician and editor of Burns' poetry (died 1805 in England)
- 23 September – John Loudon McAdam, road engineer (died 1836)
- 30 October – James Perry, born Pirie, journalist (died 1821 in England)
- December – Sir William Honyman, Lord Armadale, landowner and judge (died 1835)
- Ranald MacDonald, Roman Catholic bishop (died 1832)

== Deaths ==
- 16 April – Andrew Plummer, physician and chemist (born 1697)
- 24 April – Archibald Campbell, Church of Scotland minister and moral philosopher (born 1691)
- 3 October – William McGibbon, composer and violinist (born 1690)
- 6 December – Anne O'Brien, 2nd Countess of Orkney (born 1696)
- George Halket, schoolmaster poet and songwriter (born c. 1692)

== The arts ==
- January – Tobias Smollett becomes the first editor of The Critical Review, published in Edinburgh.
- 14 December – Rev. John Home's blank verse tragedy Douglas is performed for the first time, in Edinburgh, with considerable success, in spite of the opposition of the local church presbytery, who summon Rev. Alexander Carlyle to answer for having attended its representation; however, it fails in its early promise to set up a new Scottish dramatic tradition.

== See also ==
- Timeline of Scottish history
