= Lord President Hope =

Lord President Hope may refer to:

- Charles Hope, Lord Granton, Lord President of the Court of Session 1811–1841
- David Hope, Baron Hope of Craighead, Lord President of the Court of Session 1989–1996
