= 1763 in Scotland =

- Centuries: 16th; 17th; 18th; 19th; 20th
- Decades: 1740s; 1750s; 1760s; 1770s; 1780s
- See also: List of years in Scotland; Timeline of Scottish history 1763 in: Great Britain • Wales • Elsewhere

Events from the year 1763 in Scotland.

== Incumbents ==
=== Law officers ===
- Lord Advocate – Thomas Miller of Glenlee
- Solicitor General for Scotland – James Montgomery jointly with Francis Garden

=== Judiciary ===
- Lord President of the Court of Session – Lord Arniston, the younger
- Lord Justice General – vacant until April; then Duke of Queensberry
- Lord Justice Clerk – Lord Tinwald, then Lord Minto

== Events ==
- 16 May – James Boswell is introduced to Samuel Johnson at Thomas Davies's bookshop in London. Boswell records the event:

[Boswell:] "Mr. Johnson, I do indeed come from Scotland, but I cannot help it."
[Johnson:] "That, Sir, I find, is what a very great many of your countrymen cannot help."

- 21–29 May – John Wesley travels in Scotland.
- 26 June – stagecoach service between Glasgow and Greenock initiated.
- July – construction of Coldstream Bridge across the border with England begins.
- August 5–6 – Battle of Bushy Run (Pontiac's War) in Pennsylvania: 77th Regiment of Foot (Montgomerie's Highlanders) fight on the winning British side prior to disbandment. 78th Fraser Highlanders are also disbanded.
- August 6 – the post of Historiographer Royal for Scotland is revived for Rev. William Robertson, Principal of the University of Edinburgh.
- Before October? – a pamphlet promoting creation of a British colony of Charlotina in North America is published in Edinburgh.
- 1 October – construction of first North Bridge, Edinburgh, begins, including drainage of eastern end of Nor Loch. The Edinburgh Physick Garden moves from a site by the loch to Leith Walk.

== Births ==
- March – Mary Campbell (Highland Mary), dairymaid, beloved and a muse of Robert Burns (died 1786)
- 12 May – John Bell, surgeon (died 1820 in Rome)
- 29 June – Charles Hope, Lord Granton, politician and judge (died 1851)
- 9 August – James Leith, army officer and colonial governor (died 1816 in Barbados)
- 10 September – James Thomson, weaver poet (died 1832)
- 27 October – William Maclure, geologist of North America (died 1840 in Mexico)
- 6 December – Mary Anne Burges, religious allegorist (died 1813 in England)
- Approximate date – William McCoy, naval mutineer (suicide 1798 on Pitcairn Island)

== Deaths ==
- 5 March – William Smellie, obstetrician (born 1697)
- 30 September – William Duff, 1st Earl Fife (born 1696)

== The arts ==
- March – James Macpherson, supposedly translating "Ossian", publishes Temora: An ancient epic poem; also this year Hugh Blair writes A Critical Dissertation on the Poems of Ossian.
- Before April? – English satirical poet Charles Churchill writes The Prophecy of Famine: A Scots Pastoral.
- St Cecilia's Hall is opened by Edinburgh Musical Society as the first purpose-built concert hall in Scotland (architect: Robert Mylne).

== See also ==
- Timeline of Scottish history
