= 1831 in Scotland =

- Centuries: 17th; 18th; 19th; 20th; 21st
- Decades: 1810s; 1820s; 1830s; 1840s; 1850s
- See also: List of years in Scotland; Timeline of Scottish history 1831 in: The UK • Wales • Elsewhere

Events from the year 1831 in Scotland.

== Incumbents ==
=== Law officers ===
- Lord Advocate – Francis Jeffrey
- Solicitor General for Scotland – Henry Cockburn

=== Judiciary ===
- Lord President of the Court of Session – Lord Granton
- Lord Justice General – The Duke of Montrose
- Lord Justice Clerk – Lord Boyle

== Events ==
- Spring – the 12th-century Lewis chessmen are found in a sand-bank on the Isle of Lewis.
- 19–21 March – one of Goldsworthy Gurney’s steam road coaches runs from Edinburgh to Glasgow.
- May – Wellington Suspension Bridge over River Dee at Aberdeen opened to all traffic.
- 10 May – first steam locomotive to be built in Glasgow completed by Murdoch, Aitken & Co. for the Monkland and Kirkintilloch Railway.
- Mid-May – mineral traffic over Garnkirk and Glasgow Railway commences.
- 1 June
  - A regular horse-drawn passenger service between Leaend at Airdrie and Glasgow over the Ballochney, Monkland and Kirkintilloch and Garnkirk and Glasgow Railways commences.
  - One of Goldsworthy Gurney’s steam road coaches suffers a boiler explosion in Glasgow.
- 6 June – first iron steamboat to be launched on the River Clyde, Fairy Queen by John Neilson & Sons.
- 4 July – opening of first section of Edinburgh and Dalkeith Railway, from St Leonards to Craighall, including St Leonards Tunnel, Scotland's earliest tunnel on a public railway, and the early cast iron bridge at Braid Burn (erected in March).
- August – the Dugald Stewart Monument in Edinburgh, designed by W. H. Playfair, is completed.
- 1 August – the Roman Catholic St Thomas's Church, Keith, is opened for worship.
- 27 September – formal opening of Garnkirk and Glasgow Railway: locomotive St Rollox hauls Scotland’s first steam-worked passenger train from the Townhead terminus at Glasgow to Gartsherrie.
- 16 December – opening of first section of Dundee and Newtyle Railway, the first public railway in the north of Scotland (horse worked).
- 23 December – the second cholera pandemic (1829–51) reaches Scotland.
- The Ardrossan and Johnstone Railway opens as a waggonway from Johnstone to Kilwinning.
- Dunnet Head lighthouse, designed by Robert Stevenson, is built.
- North Church in Aberdeen, designed by John Smith, is opened.
- The Burns Monument, Edinburgh (on Calton Hill), is designed by Thomas Hamilton.
- William Wallace invents the eidograph.
- Glenugie distillery is established as Invernettie at Peterhead by Donald McLeod; Talisker distillery is opened at Carbost, Talisker, Skye, by Hugh and Kenneth MacAskill.

== Births ==
- 31 January – Alexander Balmain Bruce, theologian (died 1899)
- February – George Stewart, recipient of the Victoria Cross (died 1868 in England)
- 31 March – Archibald Scott Couper, organic chemist (died 1892)
- 2 April – David MacGibbon, architect (died 1902)
- 26 April – James Donaldson, classical scholar, educationalist and theological writer (died 1915)
- 28 April – Peter Tait, mathematical physicist (died 1901)
- 7 May – Richard Norman Shaw, architect (died 1912 in England)
- 28 May – Richard B. Angus, financier (died 1922 in Canada)
- 13 June – James Clerk Maxwell, physicist (died 1879 in England)
- 24 June – Robert Wallace, writer and politician (died 1899 in England)
- 3 July – Edmund Yates, writer (died 1894 in England)
- 18 July – John Skelton, lawyer, author and administrator (died 1897)
- 17 August – John McLaren, politician and judge (died 1910)
- 13 September – Andrew Noble, physicist (died 1915)
- 12 October – Helen Acquroff, pianist, singer, poet and music teacher (died 1887)
- 17 October – Isa Craig, née Knox, poet (died 1903 in England)
- 23 November – David MacKay, recipient of the Victoria Cross (died 1880)
- 25 December – John Bartholomew, cartographer (died 1893)

== Deaths ==
- 14 January – Henry Mackenzie, novelist (born 1745)
- 4 February – William Ritchie, newspaper editor (born 1781)
- 14 February – Robert Brown, agriculturalist (born 1757)
- 22 March – William Symington, engineer and steamboat builder (born 1764; died in London)
- May – James Campbell, army officer (born 1745)
- 1 July – Archibald Cochrane, 9th Earl of Dundonald, industrial chemist (born 1748; died in Paris)
- 16 August – Sir Hugh Innes, politician (born c. 1764)
- 17 August – Patrick Nasmyth, landscape painter (born 1787)
- Joseph Lowe, economist

== The arts ==
- James Hogg publishes Songs, by the Ettrick Shepherd.
- The Literary and Commercial Society of Glasgow is last known to be active.

== See also ==
- 1831 in Ireland
