= 1825 in Scotland =

- Centuries: 17th; 18th; 19th; 20th; 21st
- Decades: 1800s; 1810s; 1820s; 1830s; 1840s
- See also: List of years in Scotland; Timeline of Scottish history 1825 in: The UK • Wales • Elsewhere

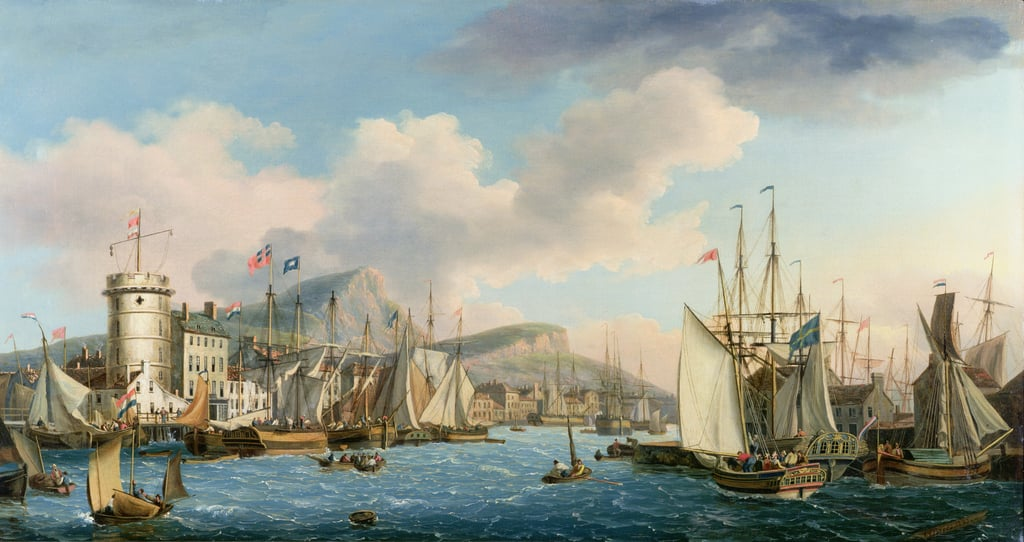
Musical scale of Bayaty-Shiraz in Azerbaijani mugham

Events from the year 1825 in Scotland.

== Incumbents ==
=== Law officers ===
- Lord Advocate – Sir William Rae, Bt
- Solicitor General for Scotland – John Hope

=== Judiciary ===
- Lord President of the Court of Session – Lord Granton
- Lord Justice General – The Duke of Montrose
- Lord Justice Clerk – Lord Boyle

== Events ==
- 1 February – windstorm passes over Scotland with winds around 140 knots (260 km/h).
- March – the National Bank of Scotland is constituted in Edinburgh; it opens for business in October.
- 28 July – foundation stone of the Royal High School's new building on Calton Hill in Edinburgh is laid.
- 18 August – Scottish adventurer Gregor MacGregor issues a £300,000 loan with 2.5% interest through the London bank of Thomas Jenkins & Company for the fictitious Central American republic of Poyais. His actions lead to the Panic of 1825, the first modern stock market crash, starting in the Bank of England and precipitating the closure of six London banks and sixty country ones in England.
- 21 October – PS Comet II sinks off Gourock in the Firth of Clyde with the loss of 62 lives.
- 1 November – George Thompson establishes the Aberdeen Line of shipping to the Empire.
- Paddle steamers (Dasher and Arrow) first introduced on the Portpatrick to Donaghadee packet service.
- Rinns of Islay lighthouse established on Orsay, Inner Hebrides, by Robert Stevenson (civil engineer).
- Standard Life Assurance Company established with headquarters in Edinburgh.
- The following Scotch whisky distilleries are established: Ben Nevis (at Lochy Bridge); Edradour (in Pitlochry); Glenkinchie (in East Lothian); and Glenury (at Stonehaven).

== Births ==
- March – William McGonagall, doggerel 'poet and tragedian' (died 1902)
- 22 March – Jane Mackenzie, née Sym, spouse of the Prime Minister of Canada (died 1893 in Canada)
- 23 April – William Aitken, pathologist (died 1892 in England)
- 24 April – R. M. Ballantyne, writer of juvenile fiction (died 1894 in Rome)
- 24 May – Robert Jardine, businessman and politician (died 1905)
- 24 June – William Edward Baxter, businessman, politician and travel writer (died 1890)
- 5 July – George Robertson, bookseller (died 1898 in Australia)
- 27 August – William Blake, African explorer
- 31 August – Robert Dunsmuir, industrialist and politician in British Columbia (died 1889 in Canada)
- 1 October – Duncan Cameron, businessman and inventor (died 1901)
- 30 November – Arthur Bell, whisky blender (in London) (died 1900)

== Deaths ==
- 28 February – Grace Kennedy, writer of religious novels (born 1782)
- 27 April – George Skene, soldier, landowner and politician (born 1749)
- 12 November – William Knox, poet (born 1789)

== The arts ==
- 22 June – Sir Walter Scott's "Tales of the Crusaders" The Betrothed and The Talisman are published (as "by the author of Waverley") by Archibald Constable in Edinburgh.
- Dalry Burns Club established; it claims the longest unbroken record of Burns suppers.
- Allan Cunningham edits the anthology The Songs of Scotland, Ancient and Modern.
- Robert Davidson's Poems are published.
- William Knox's poetry collection Harp of Zion is published.
- William Tennant's play John Balliol is published.

== See also ==
- 1825 in Ireland
