= 1821 in Scotland =

- Centuries: 17th; 18th; 19th; 20th; 21st
- Decades: 1800s; 1810s; 1820s; 1830s; 1840s
- See also: List of years in Scotland; Timeline of Scottish history 1821 in: The UK • Wales • Elsewhere

Events from the year 1821 in Scotland.

== Incumbents ==
=== Law officers ===
- Lord Advocate – Sir William Rae, Bt
- Solicitor General for Scotland – James Wedderburn

=== Judiciary ===
- Lord President of the Court of Session – Lord Granton
- Lord Justice General – The Duke of Montrose
- Lord Justice Clerk – Lord Boyle

== Events ==
- 15 January – Sumburgh Head Lighthouse in Shetland, designed by Robert Stevenson, is first illuminated.
- 28 April – foundation stone for the Melville Monument in St Andrew Square, Edinburgh, is laid.
- 18 July – thief David Haggart is hanged in Edinburgh, aged 20, for the murder of a Dumfries tolbooth keeper in 1820, leaving an autobiography, The life of David Haggart, and phrenologist George Combe's Phrenological observations on the cerebral development of David Haggart.
- 14 August – Trinity Chain Pier opens at Trinity, Edinburgh.
- 16 October – the School of Arts of Edinburgh, a predecessor of Heriot-Watt University, is established by Leonard Horner for the education of working men.
- The Royal Scottish Society of Arts is founded as The Society for the Encouragement of the Useful Arts in Scotland by David Brewster.
- The publisher T&T Clark is established in Edinburgh by Thomas Clark.
- William Hooker (botanist) publishes Flora Scotica; or, A description of Scottish plants.
- Robert Owen's Report to the County of Lanark, of a plan for relieving public distress and removing discontent is published in Glasgow.

== Births ==
- 10 March – Màiri Mhòr nan Òran, Gaelic poet (died 1898)
- 15 March – William Milligan, theologian (died 1893)
- 11 April – James Campbell Walker, architect (died 1888)
- 26 April – Robert Adamson, pioneer photographer (died 1848)
- 16 June – Old Tom Morris, golfer (died 1908)
- 19 June – George Whyte-Melville, sporting novelist (died hunting 1878 in England)
- 1 August – James Gowans, architect (died 1890)
- 17 October – Alexander Gardner, photographer (died 1882 in the United States)
- 13 December – Joseph Noel Paton, painter (died 1901)
- 29 December – John Francis Campbell, Celtic folklorist and inventor (died 1885 in France)

== Deaths ==
- 2 April – James Gregory, physician (born 1753)
- 15 June – John Ballantyne, publisher (born 1774)
- 4 October – John Rennie the Elder, civil engineer (born 1761; died in London)
- 8 November – Charles Murray, actor (born 1754 in England)
- 6 December – John Taylor, medical missionary (died in Persia)
- Isabel Pagan, poet (born c.1741)

== The arts ==
- John Galt's novels Annals of the Parish and The Ayrshire Legatees are published.
- Jane Porter's novel The Scottish Chiefs is published.
- Sir Walter Scott's novel Kenilworth is published anonymously.

== See also ==
- 1821 in Ireland
