= 1820 in Scotland =

- Centuries: 17th; 18th; 19th; 20th; 21st
- Decades: 1800s; 1810s; 1820s; 1830s; 1840s
- See also: List of years in Scotland; Timeline of Scottish history 1820 in: The UK • Wales • Elsewhere

Events from the year 1820 in Scotland.

== Incumbents ==
=== Law officers ===
- Lord Advocate – Sir William Rae, Bt
- Solicitor General for Scotland – James Wedderburn

=== Judiciary ===
- Lord President of the Court of Session – Lord Granton
- Lord Justice General – The Duke of Montrose
- Lord Justice Clerk – Lord Boyle

== Events ==
- 13 March – Clan Grant raid on Elgin in a disputed election to the town council.
- April – Dundee Lunatic Asylum officially opened.
- 1–2 April – a proclamation, signed "By order of the Committee of Organisation for forming a Provisional Government", is distributed in the Glasgow area, beginning the "Radical War" in Scotland. The following day, around 60,000 – particularly weavers – stop work across a wide area of central Scotland.
- 5 April – Radical War: "Battle of Bonnymuir" – troops capture radicals near Bonnybridge.
- 8 April – Radical War: Radical prisoners from Paisley are freed from jail in Greenock after militia have killed eight of the crowd.
- 22 April – Walter Scott is created 1st baronet of Abbotsford in the County of Roxburgh in the Baronetage of the United Kingdom.
- 1 May – Robert Owen's Report to the County of Lanark, of a plan for relieving public distress and removing discontent (published 1821) is delivered.
- 26 July – opening of Union Chain Bridge across the River Tweed between England and Scotland, designed by Captain Samuel Brown. Its span of 449 ft (137 metres) is the longest in the Western world at this time, and it is the first wrought iron vehicular suspension bridge of its type in Britain.
- 30 August – Radical War: Radical leader James Wilson, a Strathaven weaver, is executed for treason on Glasgow Green for his part in the rising.
- 8 September – Radical War: Radical leaders John Baird and Andrew Hardie are executed at Stirling for their part in the rising at Bonnybridge.
- 10 October – thief David Haggart murders the keeper of the Dumfries tolbooth while escaping imprisonment.
- 15 December – PS Comet (1812) is wrecked near Craignish.
- 22 December–23 May 1821 – Radical War: Remaining prisoners are transported from England to Australia on the convict ship Speke.
- The United Secession Church is established as a Presbyterian denomination by union of various churches which have seceded from the established Church of Scotland.
- Finishing of work on Charlotte Square completes the first New Town, Edinburgh.
- Remainder of the Nor Loch in Edinburgh is drained to form what will become Princes Street Gardens.
- The Edinburgh botanical garden is moved to the Inverleith site of the modern-day Royal Botanic Garden Edinburgh.
- Inveraray Jail and Courthouse opened.
- The mineral thomsonite is first discovered, in Scotland.
- The Edinburgh Phrenological Society is established.
- John Walker sets up as a grocer and wine and spirits merchant in Kilmarnock, from where he will sell the blended Scotch whisky which will be branded as Johnnie Walker.
- The 6th Edition of the Encyclopædia Britannica is published.
- The Scottish Cemetery at Calcutta is established in British India.
- Approximate date
  - Construction of Ardlamont House.
  - Development of Barbaraville begins.
  - Demolition and replacement of old village of Cullen to extend the gardens of Cullen House in Moray begins.
  - Gordon Setter dog breed standard formalised by Alexander Gordon, 4th Duke of Gordon.

== Births ==
- 4 April – David Kirkaldy, engineer, pioneer of materials testing (died 1897 in England)
- 21 April – Peter Kerr, architect (died 1912 in Australia)
- 1 May – Henry Yule, orientalist (died 1889 in England)
- 24 May – William Bruce Robertson, Presbyterian preacher (died 1886)
- 29 June – Patrick Stirling, locomotive engineer (died 1895 in Doncaster)
- 5 July – William John Macquorn Rankine, physicist (died 1872)
- 6 August – Donald Smith, 1st Baron Strathcona and Mount Royal, entrepreneur, statesman and philanthropist (died 1914 in Canada)
- William Downie, gold prospector (died 1893 in North America)
- James Mckenzie, outlaw in New Zealand (died after 1856 in Australia?)
- Edward Wilson, railway civil and locomotive engineer (died 1877 in England)

== Deaths ==
- 14 January – Agnes Broun or Burnes, mother of Robert Burns (born 1732)
- 12 March – Sir Alexander Mackenzie, explorer of Canada (born 1764)
- 2 April – Thomas Brown, philosopher (born 1778; died in London)
- 15 April – John Bell, surgeon (born 1763; died in Rome)
- 4 September – John Dunlop, merchant and miscellaneous writer (born 1755)
- 6 September – James Ferguson, lawyer, politician and landowner (born 1735; died in London)
- 11 October – James Keir, geologist, chemist and industrialist (born 1735; died in Birmingham)
- 8 December – Archibald Colquhoun, lawyer and politician (born c.1754)

== The arts ==
- Robert Chambers's publishing company publishes The Songs of Robert Burns.
- Walter Scott's novels The Abbot and The Monastery are published anonymously; also the first collected edition of his Poetical Works and his song "Hail to the Chief".
- Agnes C. Hall's novel The Highland Castle and the Lowland Cottage is published under the pen-name Rosalia St Clair.
- Robert Archibald Smith's The Scotish [sic.] Minstrel: a selection from the vocal melodies of Scotland ancient and modern begins publication in Edinburgh.
- David Wilkie paints Reading the Will.

== See also ==
- 1820 in Ireland
