= 1822 in Scotland =

- Centuries: 17th; 18th; 19th; 20th; 21st
- Decades: 1800s; 1810s; 1820s; 1830s; 1840s
- See also: List of years in Scotland; Timeline of Scottish history 1822 in: The UK • Wales • Elsewhere

Events from the year 1822 in Scotland.

== Incumbents ==
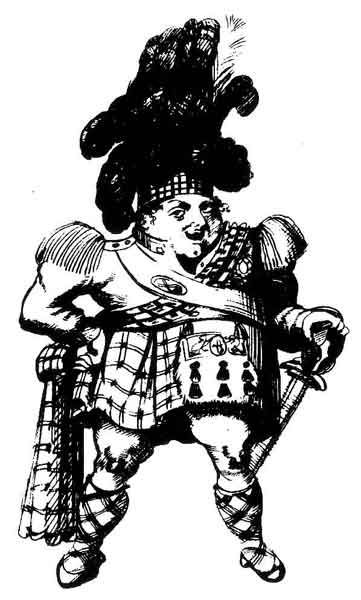
Contemporary caricature of the kilted King George IV

=== Law officers ===
- Lord Advocate – Sir William Rae, Bt
- Solicitor General for Scotland – James Wedderburn; then John Hope

=== Judiciary ===
- Lord President of the Court of Session – Lord Granton
- Lord Justice General – The Duke of Montrose
- Lord Justice Clerk – Lord Boyle

== Events ==
- 10 January – Princes Street in Edinburgh is first given gas lighting.
- May – the Edinburgh and Glasgow Union Canal, engineered by Hugh Baird, is opened throughout, from a terminus at Fountainbridge in Edinburgh to a junction with the Forth and Clyde Canal at Camelon near Falkirk, including Scotland's only canal tunnel (at Falkirk) and completion of Slateford Aqueduct; passenger boats have been operating on the canal from the beginning of the year.
- July – the Royal Association of Contributors to the National Monument of Scotland is incorporated; the foundation stone is laid in Edinburgh on 27 August.
- 15–29 August – visit of King George IV to Scotland, largely arranged by Sir Walter Scott (with the assistance of his friend, the theatrical manager William Henry Murray), first appearance of the monarch here since 1651.
- 23–24 October – the Caledonian Canal, engineered by Thomas Telford, is opened throughout, linking the east and west coasts through the Great Glen from Clachnaharry on the Beauly Firth near Inverness to Corpach on Loch Linnhe near Fort William; the passenger steamboat Stirling Castle operates through the canal.
- Cartland Bridge is completed to the design of Thomas Telford, crossing 123 feet (37 m) above the Mouse Water near Lanark.
- The Highland Show is first staged.
- The old town of Cullen, Moray, is demolished.
- The façade of Register House in Princes Street, Edinburgh, is completed to the design of Robert Reid.
- The Assembly Rooms, Aberdeen, designed by Archibald Simpson, are built.

== Births ==
- 9 February – Francis Cadell, explorer in Australasia (murdered 1879 in the East Indies)
- 13 February – James B. Beck, U.S. Senator (died 1890 in the United States)
- 12 March – William Fettes Douglas, painter (died 1891)
- 22 March – Jane Miller Thengberg, pioneer of female education in Sweden (died 1902 in Uppsala)
- 8 June – Hugh Findlay, Mormon missionary (died 1900 in the United States)
- 26 July (bapt.) – Robert William Thomson, engineer, inventor of the bicycle tyre (died 1873)
- 1 August – James Grant, author (died 1887)
- 10 September – Alexander Ferrier Mitchell, ecclesiastical historian and Moderator of the General Assembly of the Church of Scotland (died 1899)
- 1 December – Andrew Allan, shipowner (died 1901 in Canada)
- 2 December – David Masson, literary biographer and historian (died 1907)
- 6 December – David Stirling, architect in Nova Scotia (died 1887 in Canada)
- Probable date – Stewart McPherson, soldier, recipient of the Victoria Cross (died 1892)

== Deaths ==
- 27 March – Sir Alexander Boswell, 1st Baronet, politician, poet, songwriter and antiquary, killed in duel (born 1775)
- 29 March – Ewen MacLachlan, Gaelic poet and scholar (born 1775)
- Hugh Robertson, musical instrument maker (born c. 1730)

== The arts ==
- March – The Noctes Ambrosianae, imaginary colloquies, begin to appear in Blackwood's Magazine (Edinburgh).
- October – English actor Edmund Kean acquires an estate on the Isle of Bute.
- Henry Raeburn is knighted and appointed royal limner; he is present in Edinburgh for the royal visit.
- Sir Walter Scott's novels The Pirate and The Fortunes of Nigel are published anonymously, together with the poem "Halidon Hill".
- Lorenzo Bartolini's marble sculpture The Campbell Sisters dancing a Waltz is completed for the subjects' uncle, George Campbell, 6th Duke of Argyll.

== See also ==
- 1822 in Ireland
