= 1823 in Scotland =

- Centuries: 17th; 18th; 19th; 20th; 21st
- Decades: 1800s; 1810s; 1820s; 1830s; 1840s
- See also: List of years in Scotland; Timeline of Scottish history 1823 in: The UK • Wales • Elsewhere

Events from the year 1823 in Scotland.

== Incumbents ==
=== Law officers ===
- Lord Advocate – Sir William Rae, Bt
- Solicitor General for Scotland – John Hope

=== Judiciary ===
- Lord President of the Court of Session – Lord Granton
- Lord Justice General – The Duke of Montrose
- Lord Justice Clerk – Lord Boyle

== Events ==
- 14 January – the Plinian Society is inaugurated for students of natural history at the University of Edinburgh under the presidency of John Baird.
- 7 February – the Bannatyne Club is inaugurated by Sir Walter Scott and others as a text publication society to print by subscription rare texts relating to the history, literature and traditions of Scotland.
- 17 June – Charles Macintosh patents the waterproof material later used to make Mackintosh coats.
- June – local workers gather to attempt to break down "Harvie's Dyke", a wall built by distiller Thomas Harvey around his property which blocks public access to a footpath along the River Clyde in Glasgow. A 5-year legal case determines that Harvey is in the wrong.
- 18 July
  - Excise Act reduces duties on the distillation of whisky, encouraging its commercial production.
  - Act for building additional Places of Worship in the Highlands and Islands of Scotland passed.
- November – the Highland Society’s Veterinary School, predecessor of the University of Edinburgh's Royal (Dick) School of Veterinary Studies, organises its first regular classes in Edinburgh under William Dick.
- James Smith of Deanston introduces an improved method of land drainage on slopes.
- First Hebrew congregation in Glasgow in modern times established.
- Rev. Dr. Henry Duncan completes reconstruction of the Northumbrian Ruthwell Cross.

== Births ==
- 13 March – William Mackinnon, shipowner (died 1893 in London)
- 31 March – William Hart, painter of the Hudson River School (died 1894 in the United States)
- 1 May – Jemima Blackburn, née Wedderburn, watercolourist and illustrator, wife of Hugh Blackburn (died 1909)
- 17 May – Henry Eckford, horticulturist (died 1905 in Shropshire)
- 28 May – Henry MacDonald, soldier, Victoria Cross recipient (died 1893)
- 2 July – Hugh Blackburn, mathematician (died 1909)
- 11 July – John Stuart McCaig of Muckairn and Soroba, creator of McCaig's Tower, Oban (died 1902)
- 26 September – Robert Boog Watson, malacologist and Free Church minister (died 1910)
- 28 October – William Simpson, war artist (died 1899 in London)
- Thomas Bantock, businessman (died 1895 in Wolverhampton)

== Deaths ==
- 28 March – Ilay Campbell, judge (born 1734)
- 29 March – William Taylor, Moderator of the General Assembly of the Church of Scotland and Principal of the University of Glasgow (born 1744)
- 16 June – Archibald Elliot, architect (born 1761)
- 8 July – Sir Henry Raeburn, portrait painter (born 1756)
- 29 September – George Beattie, poet (born 1786)
- George Finlayson, naturalist (born 1790; died at sea)

== The arts ==
- February – a monument to poet Robert Burns (died 1796), designed by Thomas Hamilton, is opened in Alloway.
- Thomas Campbell's poem The Last Man is published.
- John Galt's novels The Entail, or The Lairds of Grippy, The Gathering of the West, Ringan Gilhaize, or The Covenanters and The Spaewife: a Tale of the Scottish Chronicles are published.
- Sir Walter Scott's novels Peveril of the Peak, Quentin Durward and St. Ronan's Well are published anonymously.
- William Tennant's poetic drama Cardinal Beaton is published.
- John Wilson's novel The Trials of Margaret Lyndsay is published.

== See also ==
- 1823 in Ireland
