= 1818 in Scotland =

- Centuries: 17th; 18th; 19th; 20th; 21st
- Decades: 1790s; 1800s; 1810s; 1820s; 1830s
- See also: List of years in Scotland; Timeline of Scottish history 1818 in: The UK • Wales • Elsewhere

Events from the year 1818 in Scotland.

== Incumbents ==
=== Law officers ===
- Lord Advocate – Alexander Maconochie
- Solicitor General for Scotland – James Wedderburn

=== Judiciary ===
- Lord President of the Court of Session – Lord Granton
- Lord Justice General – The Duke of Montrose
- Lord Justice Clerk – Lord Boyle

== Events ==
- 13 January – Torgoyle Bridge in Glenmoriston is swept away by an exceptional flood event.
- 4 February – the Honours of Scotland are put on display in Edinburgh Castle after being discovered in store there; Walter Scott, one of the prime movers in the discovery, is rewarded with a baronetcy in 1820.
- 17 February – the remains of King Robert the Bruce found at Dunfermline Abbey.
- 3 March – construction of the Union Canal begins at the Edinburgh end.
- 19 March – Church of St John the Evangelist, Edinburgh, designed by William Burn, dedicated.
- Mid-May – paddle steamer Thames makes the first steamboat passage from the Clyde to Dublin.
- 13–14 June – Rob Roy makes the first steamboat passage from the Clyde to Belfast.
- New road bridge at Spean Bridge completed to a design by Thomas Telford.
- First public supply of gas in Glasgow.
- Robert Barclay founds the engineering company in Glasgow that will become marine engineers Barclay Curle.
- Shipbuilder Thomas Morton of Leith invents the patent slip.
- Robert Stirling builds the first practical version of his Stirling engine.
- Restoration of the great house at Rosehall begins, to assist which a private canal is dug.
- The post of Regius Professor of Botany, Glasgow, is established by King George III, Robert Graham, MD, being the first holder; Thomas Thomson takes up his appointment as first Regius Professor of Chemistry here.

== Births ==
- 21 February – George Wilson, chemist (died 1859)
- 10 March – William Menelaus, mechanical engineer (died 1882 in Wales)
- 17 May – William Hay, architect (died 1888)
- 4 June – Alexander Henry, gun maker and rifle volunteer (died 1894)
- 11 June – Alexander Bain, philosopher and educationalist (died 1903)
- 22 June – Donald Mackenzie, advocate and judge (died 1875)
- 22 July – Thomas Stevenson, lighthouse designer and meteorologist (died 1887)
- 5 August – Thomas Elder, pastoralist, businessman, racehorse breeder, politician and philanthropist in Australia (died 1897 in Australia)
- 23 August – John Cairns, Presbyterian divine (died 1892)
- 25 September – Helen Macfarlane, radical writer (died 1860)
- 3 October – Alexander Macmillan, publisher (died 1896)
- 24 October – William Forsyth, writer (died 1879)
- 7 December – John Blackwood, publisher (died 1879)
- Andrew Leslie, shipbuilder
- Alexander McLachlan, poet (died 1896 in Canada)

== Deaths ==
- 13 February – George Dempster of Dunnichen, advocate, agricultural improver, banker and politician (born 1732)
- 15 March – Hector Macneill, poet (born 1746)
- 6 November – Malcolm Laing, historian (born 1762)
- 7 December – Mary Brunton, novelist (born 1778)

== The arts ==
- June–August – English poet John Keats with his friend Charles Armitage Brown makes a walking tour of Scotland, Ireland and the English Lake District. On 11 July, while in Scotland, he visits Burns Cottage, the birthplace of Robert Burns (1759–96). Before Keats arrives, he writes to a friend "one of the pleasantest means of annulling self is approaching such a shrine as the cottage of Burns — we need not think of his misery — that is all gone — bad luck to it — I shall look upon it all with unmixed pleasure." but his encounter with the cottage's alcoholic custodian returns him to thoughts of misery. On 2 August he climbs to the summit of Ben Nevis, on which he writes a sonnet.
- 10 June – first performance of the opera Rob Roy MacGregor, William Henry Murray's adaptation of Walter Scott's 1817 novel Rob Roy, in Edinburgh; Mrs Nicol plays "Jean McAlpine".
- 18 July – Walter Scott's novel The Heart of Midlothian, set during the Porteous Riots of 1736, is published (as Tales of My Landlord, 2nd series, by 'Jedediah Cleishbotham', in 4 volumes); a shipload from the Ballantyne publishing business is sent from Edinburgh to London.
- 18 September – the original Theatre Royal in Glasgow becomes the first theatre in Scotland to be lit by gas.
- James Barr composes a musical setting of the late Robert Tannahill's "Thou Bonnie Wood of Craigielea" which will later become the basis of the tune "Waltzing Matilda".
- Ludwig van Beethoven composes settings of Twenty-Five Scottish Songs.

== See also ==
- Timeline of Scottish history
- 1818 in Ireland
