= 1836 in Scotland =

- Centuries: 17th; 18th; 19th; 20th; 21st
- Decades: 1810s; 1820s; 1830s; 1840s; 1850s
- See also: List of years in Scotland; Timeline of Scottish history 1836 in: The UK • Wales • Elsewhere

Events from the year 1836 in Scotland.

== Incumbents ==
=== Law officers ===
- Lord Advocate – John Murray
- Solicitor General for Scotland – John Cunninghame

=== Judiciary ===
- Lord President of the Court of Session – Lord Granton
- Lord Justice General – The Duke of Montrose until 30 December (separate office abolished on his death)
- Lord Justice Clerk – Lord Boyle

== Events ==
- 17 May – Arbroath and Forfar Railway authorised.
- 19 May – Dundee and Arbroath Railway authorised.
- June – 17 miniature coffins of unknown provenance are found in a cave on Arthur's Seat in Edinburgh.
- 1 July – North of Scotland Bank (a constituent of Clydesdale Bank) established in Aberdeen by Alexander Anderson and others.
- 16 July – the brig Mariner leaves Loch Eriboll on the north coast for Cape Breton Island and Quebec in British North America with 154 emigrants, mostly from the nearby Reay district.
- 30 July – Savings Bank of Glasgow established.
- 7 August – St Andrew's Cathedral, Dundee (Roman Catholic) opened.
- 13 August – Edinburgh, Leith and Newhaven Railway authorised.
- Botanical Society of Scotland established as the Botanical Society of Edinburgh.
- Glasgow and Ship Bank established by merger of the Glasgow Banking Company and the Ship Bank.
- Robert Napier launches the paddle sloop Berenice for the East India Company, the first steam warship built in Scotland, the (wooden) hull being subscontracted to John Wood of Port Glasgow.
- Construction of Granton harbour begun
- Construction of modern Inverness Castle.
- Former windmill at Maxwelltown opens as converted into an astronomical observatory and the world's oldest working camera obscura, basis of the modern-day Dumfries Museum.
- Wellington School, Ayr, established for "young ladies of quality" by Mrs Gross.
- John MacCulloch's geological map of Scotland is published posthumously.

== Births ==
- 13 January – Alexander Whyte, minister of the Free Church of Scotland and theologian (died 1921)
- 12 February – John Gerard Anderson, educationalist in Queensland (died 1911 in Australia)
- 21 February – Alexander Dickson, botanist (died 1887)
- 22 February – William Angus Knight, philosopher and literary scholar (died 1916)
- 10 March – John Rhind, architect (died 1889)
- 13 March – Peter Graham, artist (died 1921)
- 18 March – James Laidlaw Maxwell, Presbyterian missionary in Taiwan (died 1921)
- 31 March – William Dingwall Fordyce, Liberal politician (died 1875)
- 5 April – John Scott, botanist (died 1880)
- 24 May – William Mortimer Clark, Lieutenant Governor of Ontario (died 1915)
- 9 June – Thomas McCall Anderson, physician (died 1908)
- 21 June – Robert Farquharson, physician and Liberal politician (died 1918)
- 26 June – Aeneas Chisholm (Bishop of Aberdeen), Roman Catholic priest (died 1918)
- 26 July – Jessie Seymour Irvine, psalmist (died 1887)
- 3 August – Colin Scott-Moncrieff, irrigation engineer in India and Egypt and Under-Secretary for Scotland (died 1916 in England)
- 11 August – Hugh Gilzean-Reid, journalist and Liberal politician (died 1911 in London)
- 7 September – Henry Campbell-Bannerman, Prime Minister of the United Kingdom (died 1908 in 10 Downing Street, London)
- 23 September – Samuel Chisholm, Liberal politician and Lord Provost of Glasgow (died 1923)
- 22 October – Mungo Park, golfer (died 1904)
- 28 October – James Edward Tierney Aitchison, surgeon and botanist (died 1898)
- 16 November – David Binning Monro, classical scholar (died 1905)
- 4 December (probable date) – Duncan MacGregor Crerar, poet (died 1916)
- John Gregorson Campbell, minister of the church and folklorist (died 1891)

== Deaths ==
- 15 February – John Gillies, Historiographer Royal for Scotland (born 1747)
- 24 February – Henry Liston, minister of the church and inventor (born 1771)
- 4 April – John Grieve, poet (born 1781)
- 23 June – James Mill, historian, economist, political theorist and philosopher (born 1773; died in London)
- 11 July – James Howe, animal and portrait painter (born 1780)
- August – Sir John Hope, British Army officer (born 1765)
- 21 October – Donald Gregory, antiquarian (born 1803)
- 26 November – John Loudon McAdam, civil engineer and road-builder (born 1756)
- 30 December – James Graham, 3rd Duke of Montrose, nobleman, politician and Lord Justice General (born 1755)
- John Heaviside Clark, artist (born c.1771)

== The arts ==
- Painter David Wilkie is granted a knighthood.
- 5 March – George Brodie appointed Historiographer Royal

== See also ==
- 1836 in Ireland
