= 1759 in Scotland =

- Centuries: 16th; 17th; 18th; 19th; 20th
- Decades: 1730s; 1740s; 1750s; 1760s; 1770s
- See also: List of years in Scotland; Timeline of Scottish history 1759 in: Great Britain • Wales • Elsewhere

Events from the year 1759 in Scotland.

== Incumbents ==
=== Law officers ===
- Lord Advocate – Robert Dundas the younger
- Solicitor General for Scotland – Andrew Pringle of Alemore; then Thomas Miller of Glenlee

=== Judiciary ===
- Lord President of the Court of Session – Lord Glendoick
- Lord Justice General – Lord Ilay
- Lord Justice Clerk – Lord Tinwald

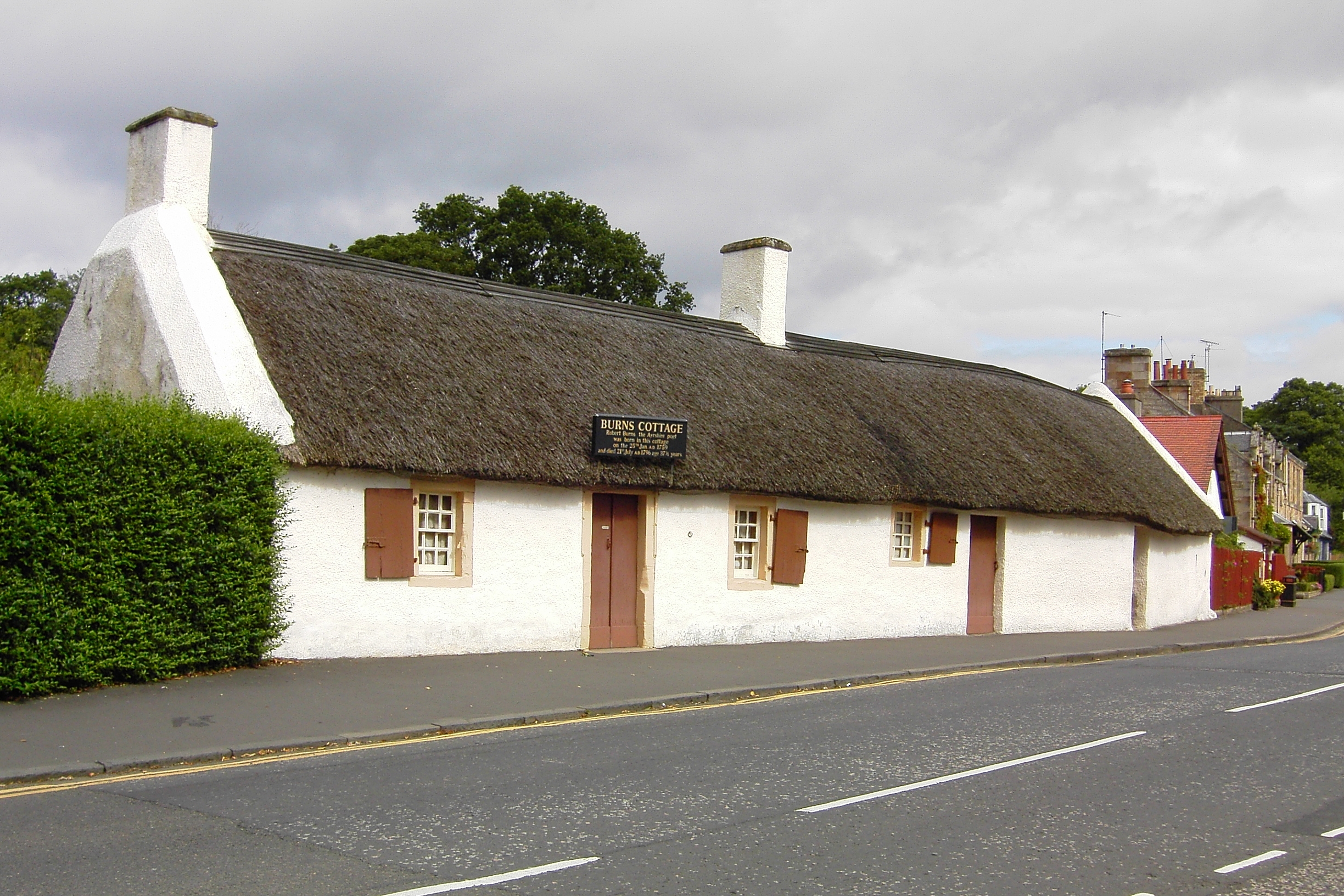
Burns Cottage, Robert Burns' birthplace at Alloway

== Events ==
- 13 September – Battle of the Plains of Abraham (Seven Years' War): British forces, including the 78th Fraser Highlanders, defeat those of the French to take Quebec City.
- September–October – Benjamin Franklin visits Scotland.
- 87th Regiment of Foot (Keith's Highlanders) raised at Perth and sent to Germany.
- Dumfries House, designed by Robert Adam, completed.
- David Erskine establishes his own legal practice in Edinburgh, origins of the partnership Dundas & Wilson.
- The Carron Company establishes its ironworks at Falkirk.

== Births ==
- 25 January – Robert Burns, national poet of Scotland (died 1796)
- 5 March – John Jamieson, Secession minister and lexicographer (died 1838)
- 26 March – John Mayne, printer, journalist and poet (died 1836 in London)
- 29 March – Alexander Chalmers, biographer and editor (died 1834 in London)
- 4 May (baptism) – Isabella Kelly, novelist and poet (died 1857 in London)
- 7 May – John Beugo, engraver (died 1841)
- 22 June – John Gilchrist, Indologist and surgeon (died 1841 in Paris)
- 22 September – William Playfair, political economist (died 1823 in London)
- Aeneas Chisholm, Roman Catholic Vicar Apostolic of the Highland District (died 1818)
- Approximate date – Anne Rankine, innkeeper and possible muse of Robert Burns (died 1843)

== Deaths ==
- 20 January – James Fergusson, Lord Kilkerran, judge (born 1688)
- 11 March – John Forbes, British Army general (born 1707; died in Philadelphia)
- 7 August – John Kennedy, 8th Earl of Cassilis (born 1700)

== Publications ==
- William Robertson – The History of Scotland During the Reigns of Queen Mary and of King James
- Adam Smith – The Theory of Moral Sentiments, embodying some of his Glasgow lectures

== See also ==
- Timeline of Scottish history
