= 1826 in Scotland =

- Centuries: 17th; 18th; 19th; 20th; 21st
- Decades: 1800s; 1810s; 1820s; 1830s; 1840s
- See also: List of years in Scotland; Timeline of Scottish history 1826 in: The UK • Wales • Elsewhere

Events from the year 1826 in Scotland.

== Incumbents ==
=== Law officers ===
- Lord Advocate – Sir William Rae, Bt
- Solicitor General for Scotland – John Hope

=== Judiciary ===
- Lord President of the Court of Session – Lord Granton
- Lord Justice General – The Duke of Montrose
- Lord Justice Clerk – Lord Boyle

== Events ==
- January – the Glasgow City Mission is founded by David Nasmith, initiating the global City Mission movement.
- 17 January – The Ballantyne printing business in Edinburgh crashes, ruining Sir Walter Scott as a principal investor. He undertakes to repay his creditors from his writings. His publisher Archibald Constable also fails. Also this year, Scott publishes "Letters of Malachi Malgrowther" in the Edinburgh Weekly Journal in support of Scottish banks being able to continue to issue smaller-denomination notes.
- 5 May – the Ballochney Railway is authorised.
- 11 May – attainder of Threipland baronets of Fingask Castle (imposed for support of the Jacobite risings) is repealed and Patrick (also known as Peter) Budge Murray Threipland (1762–1837), an advocate, is restored to the dignity of a baronet.
- 26 May – the Edinburgh and Dalkeith Railway and Garnkirk and Glasgow Railway are authorised.
- 18 August – explorer Alexander Gordon Laing (born 1793 in Edinburgh) becomes the first European to reach Timbuktu but on 26 September is murdered there.
- 23 August – last fatal duel in Scotland fought near Kirkcaldy: linen manufacturer David Landale shoots banker George Morgan.
- 1 October – opening of the Monkland and Kirkintilloch Railway.
- 17 October – Thomas Carlyle and Jane Welsh marry in Templand and set up home in Edinburgh.
- 26 October – Gattonside suspension footbridge is opened at Melrose.
- October – James Drew begins in practice as a solicitor in Glasgow, a predecessor of McClure Naismith.
- Construction of the National Monument, Edinburgh on Calton Hill (to the dead of the Napoleonic Wars) is commenced; it will never be completed.
- First spa building at "Saint Ronan's Well", Innerleithen built.
- Glendronach distillery, by Huntly, and Old Pulteney distillery, by Wick, Caithness, are established.
- The auctioneers Lyon & Turnbull are established in Edinburgh.
- Christian Isobel Johnstone, as 'Margaret Dods', publishes The Cook and Housewife's Manual.
- Approximate date – John Bartholomew Sr. sets up independently as an engraver and cartographer in Edinburgh, a predecessor of Collins Bartholomew.
- Possible date – Discovery of the Hunterston Brooch.

== Births ==
- 21 January – Sir Archibald Alison, 2nd Baronet, British Army officer (died 1907 in London)
- 8 March – William Notman, pioneer photographer in Canada (died 1891 in Canada)
- 10 April – William Henderson, shipowner and philanthropist (died 1904)
- 26 April – Robert Adamson, pioneer photographer (died 1848)
- 26 May – James Leith, British Army officer, recipient of the Victoria Cross (died 1869 in London)
- 8 June – Thomas Faed, genre painter (died 1900 in London)
- 12 June – William Alexander, novelist and journalist (died 1894)
- 7 September – John McLachlan, first bishop of the restored Roman Catholic Diocese of Galloway (died 1893)
- 11 October – James Munro, soldier, recipient of the Victoria Cross (died 1871)
- 30 November – Anthony Home, military surgeon, recipient of the Victoria Cross (died 1914 in London)
- 8 December – John Brown, royal servant (died 1883)
- John Sands, journalist (died 1900)

== Deaths ==
- 21 February – John Kay, caricaturist, engraver and miniaturist (born 1742)
- 21 August – John Barclay, comparative anatomist (born 1758)
- December – William Glen, poet (born 1789)

== The arts ==
- 2 June – the Irvine Burns Club is formed at the Milne's Inn under the presidency of Dr. John MacKenzie, who had known Robert Burns.
- The Scottish Academy is established in Edinburgh.
- James Hogg's poetry Queen Hynde is published.
- Sir Walter Scott's novel Woodstock is published anonymously.

== See also ==
- 1826 in Ireland
