= 1762 in Scotland =

- Centuries: 16th; 17th; 18th; 19th; 20th
- Decades: 1740s; 1750s; 1760s; 1770s; 1780s
- See also: List of years in Scotland; Timeline of Scottish history 1762 in: Great Britain • Wales • Elsewhere

Events from the year 1762 in Scotland.

== Incumbents ==
=== Law officers ===
- Lord Advocate – Thomas Miller of Glenlee
- Solicitor General for Scotland – James Montgomery jointly with Francis Garden

=== Judiciary ===
- Lord President of the Court of Session – Lord Arniston, the younger
- Lord Justice General – Marquess of Tweeddale to 9 December; then vacant
- Lord Justice Clerk – Lord Tinwald

== Events ==
- 10 March – William Robertson is elected Principal of the University of Edinburgh, an office which he will hold until his death in 1793, contributing to the Scottish Enlightenment.
- c. April – new building for Perth Academy occupied.
- 5 November – John Watson's Institution established in Edinburgh (school closed 1975).
- Admiral John Ross of Balnagowan Castle initiates land tenure reform in the Highlands which will evolve into the Highland Clearances.
- Economic crisis.
- Joseph Black first makes known his discoveries on latent heat, in Glasgow.

== Births ==
- 31 January – Lachlan Macquarie, British Army officer and Governor of New South Wales (died 1824 in London)
- 2 February – William Balmain, naval surgeon and civil administrator in New South Wales (died 1803 in London)
- 4 February – James Millar, physician and encyclopædist (died 1827)
- 30 April – George Murray, 5th Earl of Dunmore, politician (died 1836)
- 17 July – Alexander Crombie, Presbyterian minister, schoolmaster and philosopher (died 1840 in London)
- 11 September – Joanna Baillie, poet and dramatist (died 1851 in London)
- 28 September – James Horsburgh, hydrographer of the East Indies (died 1836 in Kent)
- Approximate date – James Bisset, artist, manufacturer, writer, collector, art dealer and poet (died 1832 in the English midlands)

== Deaths ==
- 9 December – John Hay, 4th Marquess of Tweeddale (born 1695)
- 21 December – Alexander Forbes, 4th Lord Forbes of Pitsligo, Jacobite (born 1678)

== See also ==
- Timeline of Scottish history
