= 1755 in Scotland =

- Centuries: 16th; 17th; 18th; 19th; 20th
- Decades: 1730s; 1740s; 1750s; 1760s; 1770s
- See also: List of years in Scotland; Timeline of Scottish history 1755 in: Great Britain • Wales • Elsewhere

Events from the year 1755 in Scotland.

== Incumbents ==
=== Law officers ===
- Lord Advocate – Robert Dundas the younger
- Solicitor General for Scotland – Patrick Haldane of Gleneagles, jointly with Alexander Hume; then Andrew Pringle of Alemore

=== Judiciary ===
- Lord President of the Court of Session – Lord Glendoick
- Lord Justice General – Lord Ilay
- Lord Justice Clerk – Lord Tinwald

== Events ==
- June – Joseph Black's discovery of carbon dioxide and magnesium is communicated in a paper to the Philosophical Society of Edinburgh.
- 1 November – Lisbon earthquake felt in Scotland.
- Demographic history of Scotland: First reliable national census conducted by Rev. Alexander Webster, showing the country's population as 1,265,380. Four towns have populations of over 10,000, with Edinburgh the largest with 57,000 inhabitants.
- Construction of St Ninian's Church, Tynet, the country's oldest surviving post-Reformation Roman Catholic clandestine church.
- Ironworks established at Furnace, Argyll.
- Work on William Roy's survey of Scotland concludes.

== Births ==
- 18 January – James Hamilton, 7th Duke of Hamilton (died 1769)
- 21 February – Anne Grant, poet (died 1838)
- 25 June – Archibald Gracie merchant and shipowner (died 1829 in the United States)
- August 5 – James Playfair, Scottish Neoclassical architect (died 1794)
- 17 August – William Paterson, soldier, colonial governor in Australia, explorer and botanist (died 1810 at sea)
- 4 September – Mary FitzMaurice, 4th Countess of Orkney, née O'Brien (died 1831)
- October – George Galloway, poet and playwright
- November – John Dunlop, merchant and songwriter (died 1820)

== Deaths ==
- 5 June – John Sinclair, Lord Murkle, judge
- 4 October – Sir John Clerk, 2nd Baronet, politician, lawyer, judge and composer (born 1676)

== The arts ==
- 25 February – 11-year-old David Allan begins to study painting at the new Foulis Academy in Glasgow.
- David Dalrymple, as editor, publishes Edom of Gordon: an ancient Scottish poem.

== See also ==
- Timeline of Scottish history
