= 1817 in Scotland =

- Centuries: 17th; 18th; 19th; 20th; 21st
- Decades: 1790s; 1800s; 1810s; 1820s; 1830s
- See also: List of years in Scotland; Timeline of Scottish history 1817 in: The UK • Wales • Elsewhere

Events from the year 1817 in Scotland.

== Incumbents ==
=== Law officers ===
- Lord Advocate – Alexander Maconochie
- Solicitor General for Scotland – James Wedderburn

=== Judiciary ===
- Lord President of the Court of Session – Lord Granton
- Lord Justice General – The Duke of Montrose
- Lord Justice Clerk – Lord Boyle

== Events ==
- 25 January – The Scotsman is first published in Edinburgh as a liberal weekly newspaper by lawyer William Ritchie and customs official Charles Maclaren.
- 1 March – suffocating fumes in the Leadhills lead mine kill seven.
- 1 April – Blackwood's Magazine is launched as the Edinburgh Monthly Magazine, a Tory publication. In October the publisher, William Blackwood, relaunches it as Blackwood's Edinburgh Magazine.
- 20 May – Royal Botanic Institution of Glasgow founded by Thomas Hopkirk and others to establish a Glasgow Botanic Garden.
- June – Union Canal authorised.
- 10 July – David Brewster patents the kaleidoscope.
- 15 October – school of whales seen in the Tay.
- November – Thomas Chalmers, in a sermon, appeals for a Christian effort to deal with the social condition of Glasgow.
- 4 December – The Inverness Courier is first published as a newspaper by John and Christian Isobel Johnstone.
- Dingwall Canal completed.
- A typhus epidemic occurs in Edinburgh and Glasgow.
- Dufftown founded by James Duff, 4th Earl Fife, in Moray.
- St Andrew's Cathedral, Aberdeen, opened as St Andrew's Chapel within the Episcopal Church.
- Calton Gaol, Edinburgh, completed.
- Old Tolbooth, Edinburgh, demolished.
- Glasgow Botanic Gardens created.
- Corsewall Lighthouse, designed by Robert Stevenson, first illuminated.
- Thomas Telford's ferry piers at Invergordon and Inverbreakie are built.
- Bladnoch distillery founded by John and Thomas McClelland near Wigtown.
- Teaninich distillery founded by Hugh Munro at Alness.
- The post of Regius Professor of Chemistry at the University of Glasgow is established by King George III.
- Approximate date – the Kilmarnock and Troon Railway introduces into service The Duke, the first steam locomotive on a railway in Scotland.

== Births ==
- February – Samuel Morison Brown, chemist, poet and essayist (died 1856)
- 15 February – Robert Angus Smith, atmospheric chemist (died 1884)
- 28 February – Walter Hood Fitch, botanical artist (died 1892)
- 9 April – Alexander Thomson, Greek Revival architect (died 1875)
- 29 April – Adam White, zoologist (died 1878)
- 17 May
  - Thomas Davidson, palaeontologist (died 1885)
  - John Ross, explorer (died 1903 in Australia)
- 22 May – James Macaulay, physician and literary editor (died 1902)
- 1 June – David Lyall, botanist (died 1895)
- 16 June – Alexander Forbes, bishop of Brechin (died 1875)
- 25 August – William Graham, wine merchant, art patron and Liberal politician (died 1885)
- 8 September – Stephen Hislop, Free Church missionary and geologist (died 1863 in India)
- 16 September – William Smith, architect (died 1891)
- 21 September – John Allan Broun, magnetologist (died 1879)
- 12 October – William Collins, publisher, Lord Provost of Glasgow and temperance activist (died 1895)
- 17 October – Alexander Mitchell, banker, railroad financier and Democratic politician (died 1887 in the United States)
- 29 October – Angus Macmillan, shipbuilder and politician on Prince Edward Island (died 1906 in Canada)
- 4 December – Thomas Thomson, military surgeon and botanist (died 1878 in India)
- 10 December – Alexander Wood, physician and inventor of the hypodermic syringe (died 1884)
- John Millar, Lord Craighill, Solicitor General (died 1888)
- Approximate date – Marion Kirkland Reid, feminist (died 1902?)

== Deaths ==
- 8 February – Francis Horner, Whig politician, journalist, lawyer and political economist (born 1778; died in Italy)
- 3 September – James Byres of Tonley, art dealer (born 1734)
- 2 October – Alexander Monro, anatomist (born 1733)
- 8 October – Henry Erskine, lawyer and Whig politician (born 1746)

== The arts ==
- 19 September – the body of poet Robert Burns (died 1796) is moved to a new mausoleum in Dumfries.
- 31 December – Walter Scott's novel Rob Roy is published anonymously.

== See also ==
- Timeline of Scottish history
- 1817 in Ireland
