= 1754 in Scotland =

- Centuries: 16th; 17th; 18th; 19th; 20th
- Decades: 1730s; 1740s; 1750s; 1760s; 1770s
- See also: List of years in Scotland; Timeline of Scottish history 1754 in: Great Britain • Wales • Elsewhere

Events from the year 1754 in Scotland.

== Incumbents ==
=== Law officers ===
- Lord Advocate – William Grant of Prestongrange; then Robert Dundas the younger
- Solicitor General for Scotland – Patrick Haldane of Gleneagles, jointly with Alexander Hume

=== Judiciary ===
- Lord President of the Court of Session – vacant until 22 January; then Lord Glendoick
- Lord Justice General – Lord Ilay
- Lord Justice Clerk – Lord Tinwald

== Events ==
- 25 March – Lord Harwicke's Marriage Act 1753 "for the Better Preventing of Clandestine Marriage" comes into force in England and Wales, giving increased incentive for couples to contract Border marriages in Scotland.
- 14 May – The Royal and Ancient Golf Club of St Andrews is founded as the Society of St Andrews Golfers, a group of players on St Andrews Links.
- 22 May – In fiction, the village of Brigadoon disappears into the Highland mist (alternate sources say 1747).
- 11 July – William Burnett establishes the Aberdeen law firm that will continue in business as Burnett and Reid into the 21st century.
- The Select Society is established as The St Giles' Society by a group of 15 Edinburgh intellectuals, part of the Scottish Enlightenment.
- Old Spey Bridge at Grantown-on-Spey is completed by the military.
- Chemist Joseph Black discovers "carbonic acid gas", i.e. carbon dioxide.

== Births ==
- 9 June – Francis Mackenzie, 1st Baron Seaforth, soldier and clan chief (died 1815)
- 2 August – Lady Charlotte Murray, botanist (died 1808 in Bath)
- 21 August – William Murdoch, inventor (died 1839 in Birmingham)
- Grace Elliott, née Dalrymple, courtesan and socialite (died 1823 in France)
- John Graham, painter (died 1817)
- William John Gray, 13th Lord Gray, soldier (suicide 1807)

== Deaths ==
- 25 March – William Hamilton, exiled Jacobite poet (born 1704)
- 2 June – Ebenezer Erskine, Secessionist minister (born 1680)
- 17 June – George Ross, 13th Lord Ross (born 1681)
- 27 July – Patrick Grant, Lord Elchies, judge (born 1691)
- 19 August
  - John Pringle, Lord Haining, lawyer, politician, judge and landowner (born c. 1674)
  - William Ross, 14th Lord Ross (born c. 1720)
- 23 August – William Cleghorn, philosopher (born 1718)
- 2 September – Alexander Leslie, 5th Earl of Leven (born 1695)

== See also ==
- Timeline of Scottish history
