= Charles Finnigan =

Scottish dental surgeon

Surgeon Rear-Admiral (D) Charles Finnigan CB
- Born: Charles Joseph Finnigan; 3 April 1901; Dundee
- Died: 27 July 1967 (aged 66); Queen Alexandra Military Hospital, London
- Occupation: dental surgeon
- Known for: Honorary Dental Surgeon to the Queen from 1955 to 1960

Charles Joseph Finnigan, CB (3 April 1901 – 27 July 1967) was a Scottish dental surgeon who became Surgeon Rear-Admiral (D) in the Royal Navy. He served as Honorary Dental Surgeon to the Queen from 1955 to 1960.

== Life ==
Charles Finnigan was born on 3 April 1901 at Lawside House, Dundee. His father was Andrew Finnigan, a liquor salesman, and his mother was Margaret Breslin. They were married on 26 Sept 1890 at Lochee, Dundee.

Charles was educated at Harris Academy, Dundee. He graduated at St. Andrews University in 1923 having qualified as a dental surgeon. Shortly after graduation in 1923, he joined the Royal Navy as a dental surgeon. In 1937, he married Milifred Kathleen Dudgeon in Hong Kong and they had a son John A. Finnigan who also entered the Royal Navy. He died on 27 July 1967 at the Queen Alexandra Military Hospital, London, at the age of 66. His photographic portrait is available at the National Portrait Gallery, London.

== Naval career ==
- Before World War Two he served as dental surgeon on the following vessels: H.M. Ships, Delhi, Norfolk, Dorsetshire and Achilles, and also on the China Station.
- 1929 — Appointed Surgeon Lieutenant-Commander
- 1932-33 — HMS Dorsetshire
- 1933 — HMS Achilles
- 1936 — Appointed Surgeon Commander
- 1937-39 — RN Hospital, Hong Kong
- 1939-45 — Served in the United Kingdom, Africa, Italy and Malta. Made acting Surgeon Captain while on the staff of the Commander-in-Chief, Mediterranean Fleet, and served as Fleet Dental Surgeon.
- 1949 — Confirmed in the rank of Surgeon Captain and served on the staff of the Commander-in-Chief, Portsmouth
- 1955 — Made Honorary Dental Surgeon to the Queen
- 1957-60 — Appointed Surgeon Rear Admiral and Deputy Director General, Dental Services at the Admiralty.
- 1960 — Retired from the Royal Navy and made Companion of the Order of the Bath (C.B.)
