= 1758 in Scotland =

- Centuries: 16th; 17th; 18th; 19th; 20th
- Decades: 1730s; 1740s; 1750s; 1760s; 1770s
- See also: List of years in Scotland; Timeline of Scottish history 1758 in: Great Britain • Wales • Elsewhere

Events from the year 1758 in Scotland.

== Incumbents ==
=== Law officers ===
- Lord Advocate – Robert Dundas the younger
- Solicitor General for Scotland – Andrew Pringle of Alemore

=== Judiciary ===
- Lord Justice Clerk – Lord Tinwald

== Events ==
- Physician Francis Home makes the first attempt to deliver a measles vaccine.

== Births ==
- 17 February – John Pinkerton, antiquarian and cartographer (died 1826)
- 21 March – Patrick Beatson, mariner and shipbuilder in Quebec (died 1800 in Canada)
- 23 April – Alexander Cochrane, admiral (died 1832 in France)
- 9 September – Alexander Nasmyth, portrait and landscape painter (died 1840)
- 31 October – Jean Glover, poet and singer (died 1801 in Ireland)
- Alexander Mackenzie Fraser, born Alexander Mackenzie, British Army general (died 1809 in the Netherlands)

== Deaths ==
- 7 January – Allan Ramsay, poet (born 1686)
- 17 January – James Hamilton, 6th Duke of Hamilton (born 1724)
- 18 July – Duncan Campbell, nobleman and British Army officer (died of wounds received at Battle of Carillon)
- 14 October – James Francis Edward Keith, Jacobite, soldier and Prussian field-marshal (born 1696; killed at Battle of Hochkirch)
- 27 October (bur.) – Elizabeth Blackwell, botanic writer and illustrator (born 1707; died in London)
- 12 November – John Cockburn, politician

== See also ==
- Timeline of Scottish history
- 1758 in Great Britain
