= 1761 in Scotland =

- Centuries: 16th; 17th; 18th; 19th; 20th
- Decades: 1740s; 1750s; 1760s; 1770s; 1780s
- See also: List of years in Scotland; Timeline of Scottish history 1761 in: Great Britain • Wales • Elsewhere

Events from the year 1761 in Scotland.

== Incumbents ==
=== Law officers ===
- Lord Advocate – Thomas Miller of Glenlee
- Solicitor General for Scotland – James Montgomery jointly with Francis Garden

=== Judiciary ===
- Lord President of the Court of Session – Lord Arniston, the younger
- Lord Justice General – Lord Ilay to 15 April; then from 27 June Marquess of Tweeddale
- Lord Justice Clerk – Lord Tinwald

== Events ==
- 22 October – Relief Church founded as a liberal Presbyterian denomination at Colinsburgh by Thomas Gillespie, Thomas Boston and Thomas Colier.
- Fenwick Weavers' Society formed at Fenwick, East Ayrshire.
- Penicuik House in Midlothian built in Palladian style on the site of an earlier house by Sir James Clerk, 3rd Baronet, for himself.
- Dunmore Pineapple built.

== Births ==
- 17 January – James Hall, geologist (died 1832)
- 7 June – John Rennie the Elder, civil engineer (died 1821 in London)
- 27 August – William Young, Royal Navy officer (died 1847 in Surrey)
- 30 August (bapt.) – Archibald Elliot, architect (died 1823)
- October – Thomas Christie, radical political writer (died 1796 in Suriname)
- 8 October – Andrew Snape Douglas, Royal Navy captain (died 1797)
- 27 October – Matthew Baillie, physician and pathologist (died 1823 in Gloucestershire)
- 13 November – John Moore, British Army general (killed 1809 at Battle of Corunna)

== Deaths ==
- 15 April – Archibald Campbell, 3rd Duke of Argyll, politician, lawyer, businessman and soldier (born 1682 in England; died in London)
- 22 October – Patrick Heron, politician (born c. 1672)
- 23 December – Alastair Ruadh MacDonnell, Jacobite (born c. 1725)

== The arts ==
- Robert Adam and Sir William Chambers are jointly appointed Architect of the King's Works to King George III of Great Britain.
- After March – Allan Ramsay appointed to succeed John Shackelton as Principal Painter in Ordinary to King George III.
- December – James Macpherson, supposedly translating "Ossian", publishes Fingal, an Ancient Epic Poem in Six Books, together with Several Other Poems composed by Ossian, the Son of Fingal, translated from the Gaelic Language.

== Sport ==
- Bruntsfield Links Golfing Society formed on the outskirts of Edinburgh.

== See also ==
- Timeline of Scottish history
