= 1832 in Scotland =

- Centuries: 17th; 18th; 19th; 20th; 21st
- Decades: 1810s; 1820s; 1830s; 1840s; 1850s
- See also: List of years in Scotland; Timeline of Scottish history 1832 in: The UK • Wales • Elsewhere

Events from the year 1832 in Scotland.

== Incumbents ==
=== Law officers ===
- Lord Advocate – Francis Jeffrey
- Solicitor General for Scotland – Henry Cockburn

=== Judiciary ===
- Lord President of the Court of Session – Lord Granton
- Lord Justice General – The Duke of Montrose
- Lord Justice Clerk – Lord Boyle

== Events ==
- 21 January – The Marquis of Lothian's Waggonway is opened.
- 4 June – the Scottish Reform Act, reforming the Scottish Westminster constituencies and enlarging the electorate from 5,000 to 60,000, is passed in Parliament contemporaneously with similar legislation for other constituents of the U.K., becoming law from 17 July. On 11 August around 50,000 gather on the Links in Edinburgh to celebrate the event.
- 2 June – passengers are first carried over the Edinburgh and Dalkeith Railway, between St Leonards and North Esk by horse-drawn carriage.
- 16 July – "The Bad Day": 31 sixareens (the traditional fishing craft of Shetland) are lost in a storm with 105 crew.
- Commissioners of Woods and Forests become the Commissioners of Woods, Forests, Land Revenues, Works and Buildings and begin to manage the hereditary land revenues of the Crown in Scotland formerly controlled by the Barons of the Exchequer, under terms of this year's Crown Lands (Scotland) Act.
- September – a Jewish burial ground is established on part of the site that will shortly become Glasgow Necropolis.
- Edinburgh City Mission is established by David Nasmith.
- Glen Scotia distillery is established in Campbeltown.
- Elie Golf Club, North Berwick Golf Club and The Grange Club (an Edinburgh sports club) are established.
- John Thomson's The Atlas of Scotland is published in Edinburgh.
- George IV Bridge in Edinburgh is completed to the design of Thomas Hamilton.
- Stirling New Bridge is completed to the design of Robert Stevenson.
- The planned community of Port Wemyss, originally called Wemysshaven, near Portnahaven on Islay, is built by the local laird, Walter Frederick Campbell MP.
- Craignish Castle is rebuilt around this date.
- Agriculturalist William McCombie forms his herd of black Aberdeen Angus cattle.

== Births ==
- 26 February – Thomas Anderson, botanist (died 1870)
- 20 May – Charles Umpherston Aitchison, colonial governor (died 1896 in England)
- 12 August – Hely Hutchinson Almond, rugby player and educationalist (died 1903)
- 19 December – John Kirk, physician, naturalist, companion to explorer David Livingstone and British administrator in Zanzibar (died 1922)
- James Burgess, archaeologist active in India (died 1916)
- George Anderson Lawson, sculptor (died 1904 in England)
- Frederick Thomas Pilkington, architect (born in England; died 1898)
- J. B. Selkirk (James Brown), poet and essayist (died 1904)

== Deaths ==
- 27 January – Andrew Bell, educationist and minister of religion (born 1753; died in Cheltenham)
- 13 May – Andrew Duncan, physician (born 1773)
- 30 May – John Clerk, Lord Eldin, judge and art collector (born 1757)
- 23 June – Sir James Hall, geologist (born 1761)
- 21 September – Sir Walter Scott, historical novelist and poet (born 1771)
- 3 November – Sir John Leslie, physicist (born 1766)
- 24 December – Thomas Morton, shipbuilder (born 1781)

== The arts ==
- 4 February – Chambers's Edinburgh Journal is established by William Chambers.
- 14 August – première of Felix Mendelssohn's concert overture The Hebrides in London.
- 21 September – historical novelist and poet Sir Walter Scott dies aged 61 at his home, Abbotsford House, leaving his novel The Siege of Malta unfinished; he is buried in the grounds of Dryburgh Abbey with Presbyterian and Episcopalian ministers in attendance. His novels Count Robert of Paris and Castle Dangerous are published this year.
- Tait's Edinburgh Magazine is established by William Tait.
- John Donald Carrick edits the poetry anthology Whistle Binkie.
- James Hogg, writing as "The Ettrick Shepherd", publishes the poems Altrive Tales.
- William Motherwell publishes his Poems, narrative and lyrical in Glasgow.

== See also ==
- 1832 in Ireland
