= William Baxter Collier Fyfe =

Scottish painter

- Born: 10 July 1835; Dundee, Scotland
- Died: 15 September 1882 (aged 47); London, England

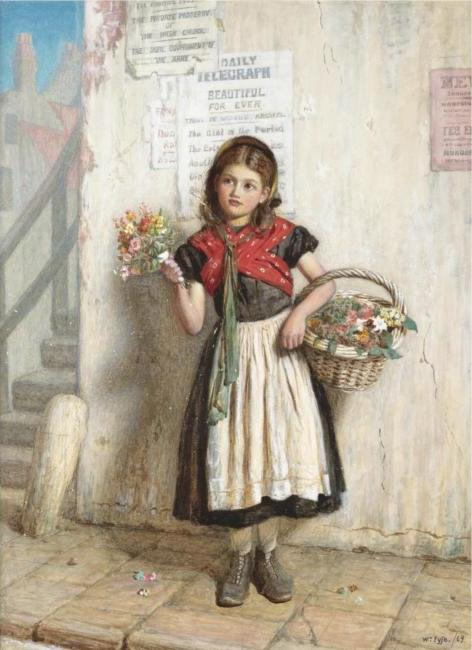
The flower girl, 1869

William Baxter Collier Fyfe (10 July 1835 – 15 September 1882) was a Scottish genre and portrait painter. He was born at Dundee in 1835. He became at an early age a student of the Royal Scottish Academy, and exhibited his first picture of importance, Queen Mary resigning her Crown at Loch Leven Castle, in the Exhibition of 1861; but this was surpassed in later years by The Raid of Ruthven. In 1863 he settled in London, and from that time onward was busily engaged with portraiture, which he varied with landscapes and genre subjects of interest and merit. Some of his most important portraits are those of the Earl and Countess of Dufferin, Admiral Grenfell, Alderman Sir William McArthur, Dr. Lorimer, and John Faed, R.S.A. He died suddenly at his residence in St John's Wood, London in 1882.5

== Works ==
His best-known genre pictures are:

- A Girl of the Period.
- On Household Cares intent.
- What can a Young Lassie dae wi' an Auld Man?
- A Good Catholic.
- Wandering Minstrels.
- A Quiet Christmas.
