= 1764 in Scotland =

- Centuries: 16th; 17th; 18th; 19th; 20th
- Decades: 1740s; 1750s; 1760s; 1770s; 1780s
- See also: List of years in Scotland; Timeline of Scottish history 1764 in: Great Britain • Wales • Elsewhere

Events from the year 1764 in Scotland.

== Incumbents ==
=== Law officers ===
- Lord Advocate – Thomas Miller of Glenlee
- Solicitor General for Scotland – James Montgomery jointly with Francis Garden; then James Montgomery alone

=== Judiciary ===
- Lord President of the Court of Session – Lord Arniston, the younger
- Lord Justice General – Duke of Queensberry
- Lord Justice Clerk – Lord Minto

== Events ==
- 3 January – Edinburgh Advertiser newspaper begins publication.
- November – The Speculative Society established in Edinburgh as a debating group, part of the Scottish Enlightenment.
- New Byth established as a planned village in Aberdeenshire by the local laird.
- New liturgy for the Scottish Episcopal Church published in Edinburgh.
- The turnip is first cultivated in Scotland as a field crop, by Dawson of Frogden (Roxburghshire).
- Howden Bridge built at Mid Calder.
- Approximate date – Yair Bridge built across the River Tweed by William Mylne.

== Births ==
- c. 1 February – George Duff, naval officer (killed 1805 at Battle of Trafalgar)
- 22 February – Alexander Campbell, musician and miscellaneous writer (died 1824)
- 5 May – Robert Craufurd, general (killed 1812 at Siege of Ciudad Rodrigo)
- 11 July – Jane Aitken, printer (died 1832 in the United States)
- 5 October – Isaac Cruikshank, painter and caricaturist (died 1811 in London)
- 10 October – John Dick, minister and theologian (died 1833)
- October – William Symington, mechanical engineer, steamboat pioneer (died 1831 in London)
- 6 November – Robert Heron, writer (died 1807 in London)
- Alexander Mackenzie, explorer of northern Canada (died 1820)

== Deaths ==
- 23 May – William Grant, Lord Prestongrange, politician and judge (born 1701; died at Bath)

== The arts ==
- Pompeo Batoni paints portraits of Thomas Dundas and Alexander Gordon, 4th Duke of Gordon in Rome.

== See also ==
- Timeline of Scottish history
