= Burnett & Reid =

Time-honored law firm in Scotland

Burnett & Reid LLP

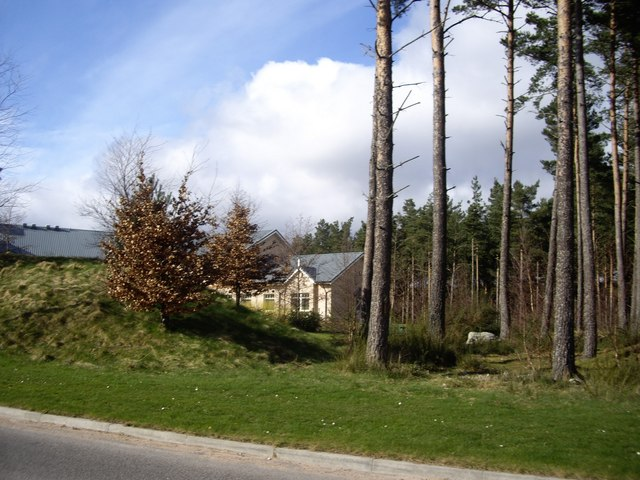
- Burnett & Reid, Banchory Office
- Company type: Limited Liability Partnership
- Industry: Legal
- Founded: 1754
- Headquarters: Aberdeen, Scotland, UK
- Number of locations: 3
- Area served: Scotland
- Services: Legal Services & Land Management
- Number of employees: c. 70
- Website: burnett-reid.co.uk

Burnett & Reid LLP is a "full service" law firm in Aberdeen, Scotland. It is the oldest legal practice in the city and claims to be one of the longest established legal practices in the United Kingdom. The firm has two offices in Aberdeen and one in Banchory.

== History ==
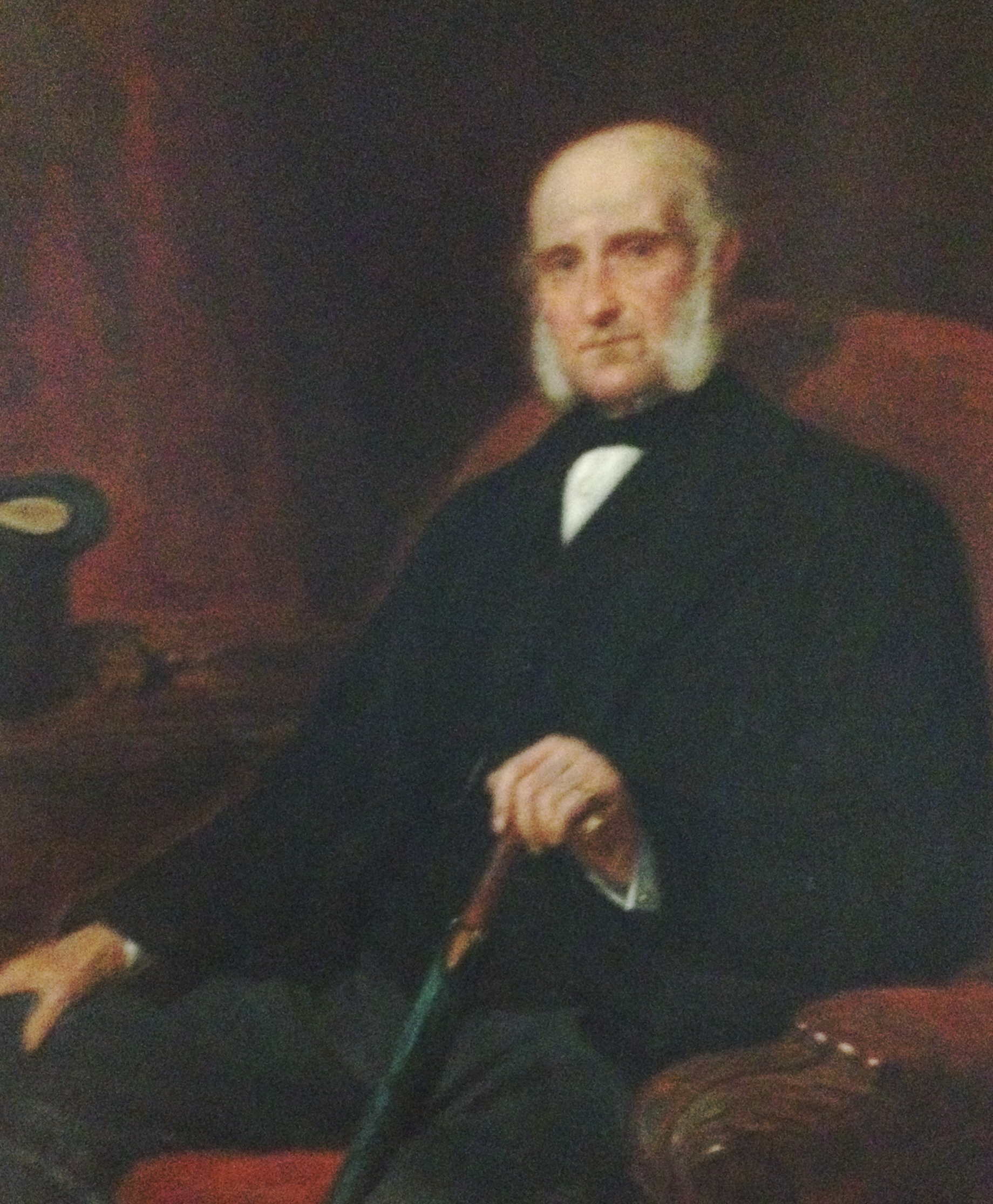
Newell Burnett

Burnett & Reid was first established by William Burnett on 11 July 1754, when he was fully admitted to membership of Society of Advocates. William was eventually succeeded in the business by his sixth son, Thomas Burnett, who joined the business in 1796, and in turn was joined in 1823 by his son, Newell Burnett. Following the death of his father, Newell Burnett assumed John Reid as a partner at which point the firm first began trading under the name of "Burnett & Reid".

In 2012 the firm converted to an LLP, becoming Burnett & Reid LLP and on 1 May 2024, the firm announced it was merging with two other Aberdeen-based legal firms, to become one of the largest full service legal practices headquartered in Aberdeen.
