= 1907 in Scotland =

- Centuries: 18th; 19th; 20th; 21st
- Decades: 1880s; 1890s; 1900s; 1910s; 1920s
- See also: List of years in Scotland; Timeline of Scottish history 1907 in: The UK • Wales • Elsewhere; Scottish football: 1906–07 • 1907–08

Events from the year 1907 in Scotland.

== Incumbents ==
- Secretary for Scotland and Keeper of the Great Seal – John Sinclair

=== Law officers ===
- Lord Advocate – Thomas Shaw
- Solicitor General for Scotland – Alexander Ure

=== Judiciary ===
- Lord President of the Court of Session and Lord Justice General – Lord Dunedin
- Lord Justice Clerk – Lord Kingsburgh

== Events ==
- 5 February – epidemic of meningitis in Glasgow, Edinburgh and Belfast
- 24 April – Titan Clydebank crane first operates at John Brown & Company's shipyard
- 24 August – last horse trams in Edinburgh operate
- 18 September – Andrew Carnegie receives the freedom of Burntisland
- New Ayr Racecourse opens
- Edinburgh College of Art gains its present name and site
- The Moine Thrust Belt in the Scottish Highlands is identified, one of the first to be discovered
- Scottish wildcat first scientifically classified
- Limited Partnership Act regulates Scottish limited partnerships

== Births ==
- 2 January – Robert Wilson, tenor (died 1964)
- 4 January – Walter Donaldson, snooker player (died 1973 in England)
- 28 January – Robert McLellan, playwright (died 1985)
- 4 February – James McIntosh Patrick, landscape painter (died 1998)
- 16 April – Martin Boddey, film and television actor (died 1975 in London)
- 22 May – Huw Lorimer, sculptor (died 1993)
- 13 August – Sir Basil Spence, architect (died 1976 in Yaxley, Suffolk)
- 28 August – Tom Hanlin, novelist (died 1953)
- 2 October – Alexander R. Todd, Baron Todd, biochemist, winner of the Nobel Prize in Chemistry (died 1997 in England)
- 7 October – Helen MacInnes, espionage novelist (died 1985 in the United States)
- 4 November – Ferguson Rodger, physician (died 1978)
- 5 December – William Barclay, Professor of Divinity (died 1978)
- 25 December – Andrew Cruickshank, actor (died 1988 in England)
- Jameson Clark, character actor (died 1984)
- Dr Catherine Gavin, academic historian, war correspondent and historical novelist (died 2000)
- Betty Henderson, actress (died 1979)

== Deaths ==
- 21 January – John Hunt, cleric, theologian and historian (born 1829)
- 4 April – Alexander Macbain, philologist (born 1855)
- 13 May – Alexander Buchan, meteorologist oceanographer and botanist (born 1827)
- 19 July – William Gunion Rutherford, classicist (born 1853)
- 30 August – James Adam, classicist (born 1860)
- 6 October – David Masson, literary critic and historian (born 1822)
- 4 November – Rev. Dr. Robert Blair, minister of religion and Gaelic scholar (born 1837)
- 6 November – James Hector, geologist, naturalist and surgeon (born 1834)
- 17 December – William Thomson, 1st Baron Kelvin, physicist (born 1824 in Ireland)
- Jane Arthur, feminist and activist (born 1827)

== See also ==
- Timeline of Scottish history
- 1907 in Ireland
