= Charles Smith (artist) =

Scottish artist (1749–1824)

Charles Smith (7 November 1749 – 19 December 1824) was a Scottish artist who worked initially as a painter of portraits but later also painted mythological and whimsical subjects.

== History ==
Smith was born on 7 November 1749 in Stenness on the Orkney Isles. His father was William Smith and his mother, Charlotte Whitefoord, was sister to Caleb Whitefoord, a diplomat and political satirist. He attended the Royal Academy Schools before moving to London to establish himself as an artist under the tutelage of J. H. Mortimer. He exhibited three portraits at the Society of Artists in 1776 but it seems that his strong political convictions, sometimes violently expressed, limited his work.

In 1783, influenced by the experiences of Tilly Kettle, Smith left England for India. There he travelled widely: he was introduced to the nawab of Oudh by John Macpherson, the then governor-general, and also spent time in Calcutta, Madras, Lucknow and probably Delhi, where he may have painted the Mughal emperor, Shah Alam II. Lucknow, in particular, was at that time a hub of artistic activity.

Smith was not alone in making this journey abroad, since portrait artists had been encouraged by the first governor-general, Warren Hastings. However, by the time that Smith, Johann Zoffany and painters arrived in the country, the market was in a state of collapse and the successors to Hastings, including Macpherson, were less interested in promoting their efforts. Many struggled to recover the payments that had been arranged for their services and their style of painting contrasted significantly with the native styles, depicting their sitters in a less flattering manner. The novelty of portraiture among the nawabs was also in decline generally. William Baillie, a jealous contemporary of Smith who had tried and failed as a painter of the even more out-of-favour Indian landscapes, described the poor pickings sarcastically in a letter to Ozias Humphry, saying "What inducement has he to paint for money?" That Smith survived there better than some of his colleagues probably reflects his family connections with politicians and members of the East India Company.

Having left India in 1787, Smith was living in London and Edinburgh between 1789 and 1797. He exhibited at the Royal Academy and in 1798 had a musical entertainment staged at Covent Garden Theatre. This musical work - A Day at Rome - was not well received and thereafter he published it as an act of protest. The Analytical Review recorded

Mr Charles Smith is a little angry at the damnation of his farce and, considering the terms of contempt in which it has been spoken of by some of the public prints, he is "inclined to hope, that by publishing it, no further loss of reputation can be sustained". We are somewhat surprised that this "dramatic trifle" should have been visited so rudely, for it seems to us fraught with every requisite for receiving a tumultuous approbation: a Highlander talks broad Scotch, an Irishman makes plenty of bulls, and a city brewer's wife favours the audience with a specimen of the London dialect, all executed in the happiest style of extravagance and buffoonery.

It is probable that Smith also earned money as a copyist of other artists: William Brummell, father of Beau Brummell, owned a copy of a Joshua Reynolds work that Reynolds himself could barely distinguish from the original. (Note: Reynolds wrote to Smith in December 1784 regarding this copy, saying "I saw the other day a picture of a child with a dog, which, after a pretty close examination, I thought my own painting, but it was a copy it seems that you made many years ago".)

Smith returned to India, working there from 1800 to 1811. In 1802, he published A Trip to Bengal, another two-act musical work, dedicating it to Macpherson in appreciation of his past hospitality. Described as an opera, this also was performed at Covent Garden and it included as its centrepiece a traditional melancholy Urdu song, Dil ne danne lea re.

He died at Leith on 19 December 1824.
