= 1829 in Scotland =

- Centuries: 17th; 18th; 19th; 20th; 21st
- Decades: 1800s; 1810s; 1820s; 1830s; 1840s
- See also: List of years in Scotland; Timeline of Scottish history 1829 in: The UK • Wales • Elsewhere

Events from the year 1829 in Scotland.

== Incumbents ==
=== Law officers ===
- Lord Advocate – Sir William Rae, Bt
- Solicitor General for Scotland – John Hope

=== Judiciary ===
- Lord President of the Court of Session – Lord Granton
- Lord Justice General – The Duke of Montrose
- Lord Justice Clerk – Lord Boyle

== Events ==
- 8 January – hanging of body-selling murderer William Burke in Edinburgh. His associate William Hare, who testified against him, is released.
- 1 June – Wishaw and Coltness Railway incorporated.
- 23 June – Royal High School, Edinburgh, opens its new building on Calton Hill.
- August – Alexander Duff is ordained into the Church of Scotland, becoming its first missionary to India.
- 2–3 August – the "Muckle Spate", a great flood of the River Findhorn which devastates much of Strathspey, washing away many bridges.
- 12 August – founding of Perth in Australia, named in honour of Colonel Sir George Murray, Secretary of State for War and the Colonies, born in the Scottish Perth and Member of Parliament for Perthshire.
- September – Timothy Burstall of Leith completes the vertical boiler geared steam locomotive Perseverance for October's Rainhill Trials on the Liverpool and Manchester Railway (although it does not formally compete).
- 29 September – foundation stone of Tolbooth Church in Edinburgh is laid.
- Construction of the National Monument of Scotland in Edinburgh, designed by Charles Robert Cockerell and William Henry Playfair, is abandoned due to funds being exhausted, leaving only a row of Doric columns supporting the entablature.
- James Beaumont Neilson's hot blast process for ironmaking is first applied commercially, at Clyde Iron Works, Glasgow.
- Craig & Rose are established as paint manufacturers in Edinburgh.
- Port Charlotte distillery is established on Islay; Auchtermuchty distillery is also established.

== Births ==
- January – George Rodgers, soldier, Victoria Cross recipient (died 1870)
- 16 February – David Mitchell, builder in Australia, father of Nellie Melba (died 1916 in Australia)
- 26 March – William Robinson Clark, theologian (died 1912 in Canada)
- 11 October – George Alexander Drummond, businessman and senator (died 1910 in Canada)
- 24 October – John Veitch, poet, philosopher and historian (died 1894)
- 31 October – Andrew Bannatyne, fur trader and politician (died 1889 in Canada)
- 9 November – Peter Lumsden, British Indian Army general (died 1918)
- 13 November – Simon Somerville Laurie, educationalist (died 1909)
- 31 December – Alexander Smith, Spasmodic poet (died 1867)
- George Corson, architect (died 1910 in Leeds)
- George Gordon, water engineer (died 1907 in Australia)
- George Yule, merchant and President of the Indian National Congress (died 1892 in London)

== Deaths ==
- 3 January – Robert Archibald Smith, composer (born 1780 in England)
- 12 September – Alexander Balfour, novelist (born 1767)

== The arts ==
- April–September – the composer Felix Mendelssohn pays his first visit to Britain, including (July) the ruined chapel at Holyrood Palace, which inspires his Symphony No. 3 (completed 1842) and (August) his trip to Fingal's Cave.
- Edwin Henry Landseer paints An Illicit Whisky Still in the Highlands.
- Sir Walter Scott's novel Anne of Geierstein, "by the author of Waverley", is published.

== See also ==
- 1829 in Ireland
