= 1827 in Scotland =

- Centuries: 17th; 18th; 19th; 20th; 21st
- Decades: 1800s; 1810s; 1820s; 1830s; 1840s
- See also: List of years in Scotland; Timeline of Scottish history 1827 in: The UK • Wales • Elsewhere

Events from the year 1827 in Scotland.

== Incumbents ==
=== Law officers ===
- Lord Advocate – Sir William Rae, Bt
- Solicitor General for Scotland – John Hope

=== Judiciary ===
- Lord President of the Court of Session – Lord Granton
- Lord Justice General – The Duke of Montrose
- Lord Justice Clerk – Lord Boyle

== Events ==
- c. July – Robert Wilson of Dunbar demonstrates a screw propeller.
- 14 August – the foundation stone of the George IV Bridge in Edinburgh is laid as authorised by an Improvement Act of this year.
- 29 November – Burke and Hare sell their first corpse for dissection by Robert Knox in Edinburgh.
- The Loretto School is established in Musselburgh by Rev. Thomas Langhorne.
- The Argyll Arcade opens in Glasgow.
- Buchan Ness Lighthouse, designed by Robert Stevenson, is first illuminated.
- George Ballantine sets up a grocery store in Edinburgh, the predecessor of Ballantine's whisky blenders.
- Farmer's son Rev. Patrick Bell produces a model reaping machine.
- New spa building at Moffat built.
- The Clunies-Ross family first settles on the Cocos (Keeling) Islands.

== Births ==
- 7 January – Sandford Fleming, engineer and surveyor, "father of time zones" (died 1915 in Canada)
- 4 March – Henrietta Keddie ('Sarah Tytler'), novelist (died 1914 in London)
- 27 May – Thomas Keith, surgeon and amateur photographer (died 1895 in London)
- 18 June
  - Alexander Balloch Grosart, Presbyterian minister and literary editor (died 1899 in Ireland)
  - Andrew Robertson, merchant in Montreal (died 1890 in Canada)
- 16 July – William McEwan, brewer and politician (died 1913 in London)
- 25 August – William Watson, Baron Watson, Lord Advocate (died 1899)
- James Barnet, New South Wales Government Architect (died 1904 in Australia)
- Gilbert Beith, merchant and Liberal politician (died 1904)

== Deaths ==
- 28 January – George Jardine, professor (born 1742)
- 13 April – Hugh Clapperton, explorer (born 1788; died in Sokoto)
- 21 July – Archibald Constable, publisher (born 1774)
- 9 August – George Fergusson, Lord Hermand, judge (born 1743)
- 28 August – Lord Archibald Hamilton, politician (born 1769)
- 24 September – Hugh Baird, canal engineer (born 1770)
- 4 November – James Hyslop, poet (born 1798; died on Santiago, Cape Verde)

== The arts ==
- 23 February – Sir Walter Scott's authorship of the Waverley Novels is first publicly acknowledged at an Edinburgh Theatrical Fund dinner. Also this year he publishes the first series of Chronicles of the Canongate ("by the author of Waverley") in Edinburgh.
- c. June – Robert Pollok's blank verse The Course of Time is published in Edinburgh by William Blackwood shortly before the poet's death on 15 September aged about 28 near Southampton while en route to Italy for his health; the first edition alone sells 12,000 copies.
- William Tennant's Scots language poem Papistry Stormed is published.

== See also ==
- 1827 in Ireland
