= Charles Hope, Lord Granton =

Scottish politician and judge

The Right Honourable Lord Granton FRSE
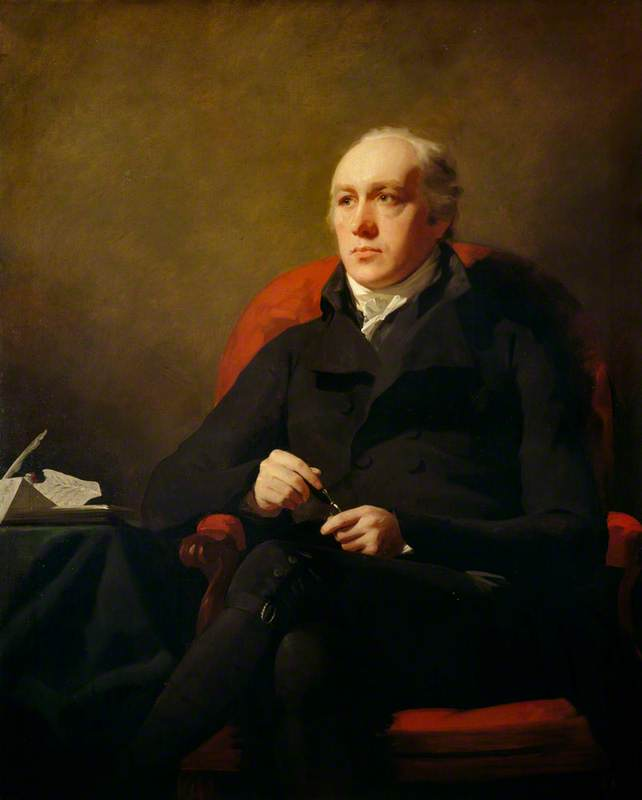

Lord President of Court of Session
- In office 10 October 1811 – 20 July 1841
- Preceded by: Lord Blair
- Succeeded by: Lord Boyle

Member of Parliament for Edinburgh
- In office 1803–1805
- Preceded by: Henry Dundas
- Succeeded by: George Abercromby

Personal details
- Born: Charles Hope; 29 June 1763
- Died: 30 October 1851 (aged 88) Edinburgh
- Spouse: Lady Charlotte Hope
- Children: 8 daughters, 4 sons

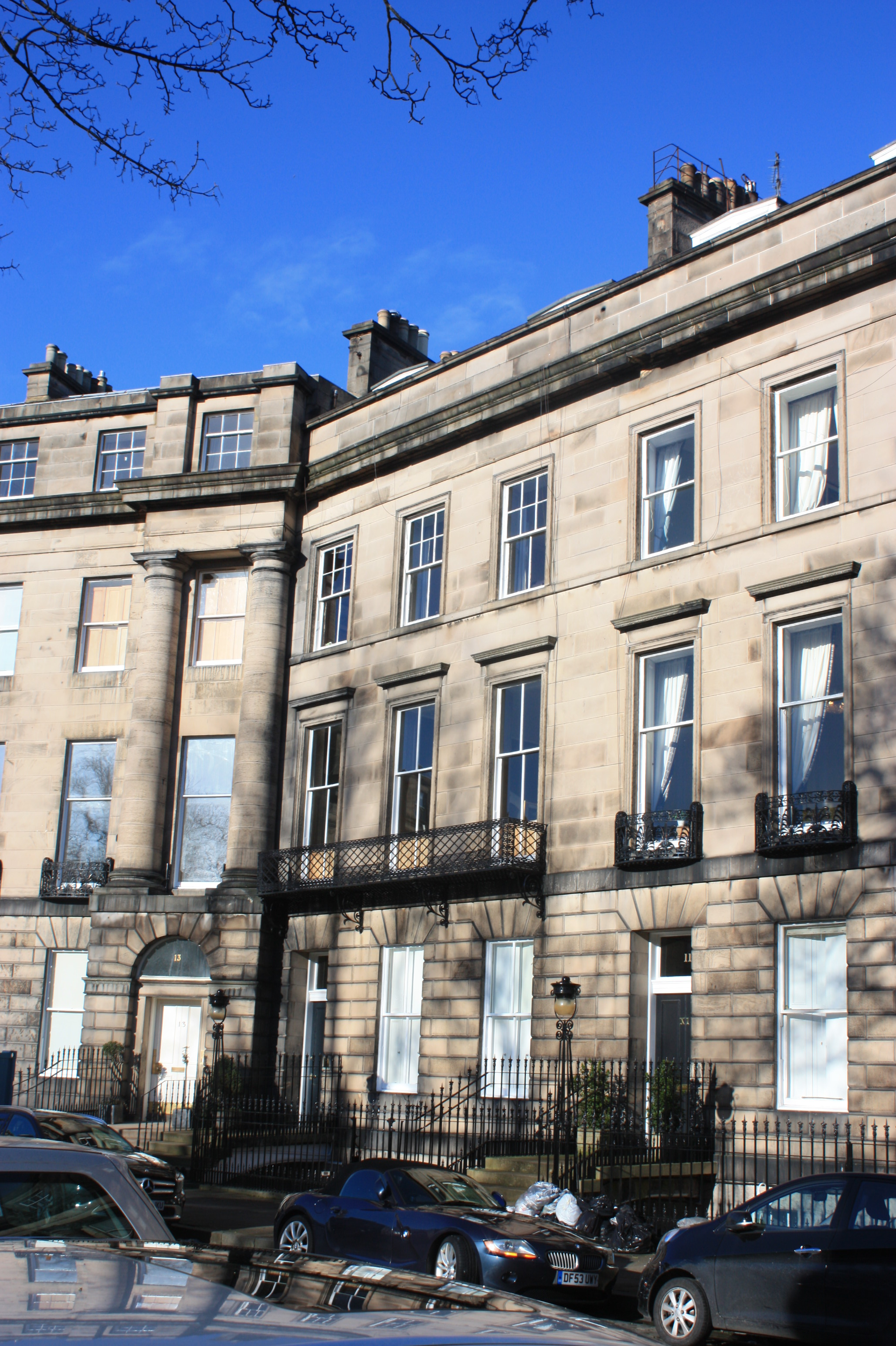
Lord Granton's Edinburgh townhouse at 12 Moray Place

Charles Hope, Lord Granton, FRSE (29 June 1763 – 30 October 1851), was a Scottish politician and judge.

== Life ==
Hope was born on 29 June 1763, the eldest son of Mary Breton, the only daughter of Eliab Breton of Forty Hill, Enfield (a granddaughter of Sir William Wolstenholme) and John Hope, Member of Parliament (MP) for Linlithgowshire, and a grandson of Charles Hope, 1st Earl of Hopetoun. He was educated at Enfield Grammar School and later at the Edinburgh High School, where in 1777 he was the Latin dux. After studying law at the University of Edinburgh, he was admitted as an advocate on 11 December 1784, and on 25 March 1786 was appointed a Deputy Advocate.

In 1788 he was elected a Fellow of the Royal Society of Edinburgh. His proposers were Allan Maconochie, Lord Meadowbank, James Gregory, and the mathematician John Playfair.

Though not conspicuous as a lawyer he was an accomplished public speaker, and in this capacity made himself useful at the Tory political meetings. On 5 June 1792 he became Sheriff of Orkney, and in June 1801 was appointed Lord Advocate in the Addington administration in the room of Robert Dundas of Arniston. Shortly afterwards he was presented with the freedom of the city of Edinburgh, together with a piece of plate, for his assistance to the magistrates in obtaining a poor's bill for the city.

At the general election in July 1802, he was returned to the House of Commons for Dumfries district, but resigned his seat when Henry Dundas's elevation to the upper house, and was returned unopposed for the city of Edinburgh (January 1803). During his service as Lord Advocate, Hope conducted through the House of Commons the Scotch Parochial Schoolmasters' Act (43 Geo. 3. c. 54), by means of which authorities building schools were also obliged to erect houses with at least two rooms for the schoolmasters.

The only speech of his reported in the 'Parliamentary Debates' was one delivered in his own defence in the debate on Whitbread's motion for the production of papers relating to Hope's censure of a Banffshire farmer named Morison, who had discharged his servant for attending drills of a volunteer regiment. Hope made an ingenious defence, and gave a lively description of the multitudinous duties of his office but though the case against him was strong, the motion, after a great party debate in which both Pitt and Fox took part, was defeated by 159 to 82.

On 20 November 1804, Hope was appointed an ordinary Lord of Session and Lord Justice Clerk in the place of Sir David Rae, Lord Eskgrove, and assuming the title of Lord Granton took his seat on the bench on 6 December 1804. On 12 November 1811, he succeeded Robert Blair, Lord Avontoun as Lord President of the Court of Session, being succeeded as Lord Justice Clerk by David Boyle, Lord Boyle. In 1820, he presided at the special commission for the trial of high treason at Glasgow, and on 17 August 1822 was admitted to the Privy Council at Holyrood House. On 29 July 1823, Hope was appointed, together with his eldest son John, on the Commission of Inquiry into the forms of process and the course of appeals in Scotland. On the death of James Graham, 3rd Duke of Montrose, in December 1836, Hope became Lord Justice General, by virtue of the Court of Session Act 1830, by which it was enacted that 'after the termination of the present existing interest' that office should 'devolve upon and remain united with the office of lord president of the court of session.' Hope retired from the bench in the autumn of 1841, and was succeeded as Lord President by David Boyle.

He died at his home on 12 Moray Place, Edinburgh, on 30 October 1851, aged 89. He was buried in the mausoleum at Hopetoun House on 4 November 1851.

== Assessment ==
Hope was a man of imposing presence, with a voice, which, according to Lord Cockburn, 'was surpassed by that of the great Mrs. Siddons alone', and he was known for his strong ability in public speaking.

Though a violent political partisan, and greatly wanting in tact and judgment, 'his integrity, candour, kindness, and gentlemanlike manners and feelings gained him almost unanimous esteem'. His charges to juries were singularly persuasive and impressive. Lockhart gives a graphic account of Hope's majestic bearing on the bench in 'Peter's Letters to his Kinsfolk' (1819, ii. 102–8), while recording what he describes 'as without exception the finest piece of judicial eloquence, delivered in the finest possible way by the Lord-president Hope.'

When the volunteer movement began, owing to the French war, Hope enlisted as a private in the first regiment of Royal Edinburgh Volunteers.

He was afterwards appointed Lieutenant-Colonel of the Corps, and performed the duties of that office with enthusiasm for several years, until the regiment was disbanded for the second time in 1814.

In December 1819, when the 'old blues' were once more summoned together, he made them 'one of the most eloquent addresses that ever was heard', and daily inspected the volunteers on duty at Edinburgh Castle while the regular troops were despatched to the western counties.

Hope's famous regimental orders of 18 October 1803, containing most curious and minute details, are given at length in Cockburn's 'Memorials'.

== Family ==
On 8 August 1793 Hope married his cousin Lady Charlotte Hope, second daughter of John Hope, 2nd Earl of Hopetoun, by his third wife, Lady Elizabeth Leslie, second daughter of Alexander, fifth earl of Leven and Melville, by whom he had four sons, the eldest of whom, John (1794–1858), was Solicitor General for Scotland from 1822 to 1830, and eight daughters. His daughter Ann Wilhelmina was married to Hercules Robertson, Lord Benholme, and his eighth and last daughter, Louisa Octavia Augusta Hope, was a promoter of domestic education.

His wife died at Edinburgh on 22 January 1834, aged 62.

David Hope, Baron Hope of Craighead, Lord President of the Court of Session from 1989 to 1996, descends from Lord Granton's third son.

Legal offices
| Preceded by Robert Dundas | Lord Advocate; 1801–1804 | Succeeded by Sir James Montgomery |
| Preceded by Sir David Rae, Lord Eskgrove | Lord Justice Clerk; 1804–1811 | Succeeded by Lord Boyle |
| Preceded by Lord Blair | Lord President of the Court of Session; 1811–1841 | Succeeded by Lord Boyle |
| Preceded by Duke of Montrose | Lord Justice General; 1836–1841 | Succeeded by Lord Boyle |
Parliament of the United Kingdom
| Preceded by William Johnstone Hope | Member of Parliament for Dumfries Burghs; July 1802 – December 1802 | Succeeded by Viscount Stopford |
| Preceded by Henry Dundas | Member of Parliament for Edinburgh; 1803–1805 | Succeeded by George Abercromby |
