= 1726 in Wales =

- Centuries: 16th; 17th; 18th; 19th; 20th
- Decades: 1700s; 1710s; 1720s; 1730s; 1740s
- See also: List of years in Wales; Timeline of Welsh history 1726 in Great Britain Scotland Elsewhere

This article is about the particular significance of the year 1726 to Wales and its people.

== Incumbents ==
- Lord Lieutenant of North Wales (Lord Lieutenant of Anglesey, Caernarvonshire, Denbighshire, Flintshire, Merionethshire, Montgomeryshire) – George Cholmondeley, 2nd Earl of Cholmondeley
- Lord Lieutenant of Glamorgan – vacant until 1729
- Lord Lieutenant of Brecknockshire and Lord Lieutenant of Monmouthshire – Sir William Morgan of Tredegar
- Lord Lieutenant of Cardiganshire – John Vaughan, 2nd Viscount Lisburne
- Lord Lieutenant of Carmarthenshire – vacant until 1755
- Lord Lieutenant of Pembrokeshire – Sir Arthur Owen, 3rd Baronet
- Lord Lieutenant of Radnorshire – James Brydges, 1st Duke of Chandos
- Bishop of Bangor – William Baker
- Bishop of Llandaff – Robert Clavering
- Bishop of St Asaph – John Wynne
- Bishop of St Davids – Richard Smalbroke

== Events ==
- 11 January - Thomas Lloyd of Halton becomes High Sheriff of Flintshire.
- 26 July - Prince Frederick, son of the Prince of Wales, is created Baron Snowdon by his grandfather, King George I of Great Britain.
- November - John Verney is appointed a judge in Wales by prime minister Robert Walpole, after switching his political allegiance.
- 26 November - New county sheriffs are appointed:
  - Broughton Whitehall of Broughton (Flintshire).
  - Thomas Rowland of Cayrey (Anglesey).
  - Richard Wellington of Hay Castle (Brecknockshire).
  - Humphrey Roberts, Brynneuadd, (Caernarvonshire).
  - David Lewis of Gernos (Cardiganshire).
  - John Lloyd of Danyrallt (Carmarthenshire).
  - Edward Salusbury of Galltfaenan (Denbighshire).
  - Morgan Morgan of Llanrumney (Glamorgan).
  - Athelstan Owen of Rhiwaedog (Merionethshire/Montgomeryshire).
  - Richard Lewis of Court-y-Gallon (Monmouthshire).
  - David Lewis, of Vogart or Llandewi (Pembrokeshire).
  - Edward Burton of Vronlas (Radnorshire).
- date unknown - Poet Anna Williams and her father Zachariah move into the London Charterhouse while he experiments in using magnetism in pursuit of the longitude prize.
- Road bridges built
  - Pont Fadog, Dyffryn Ardudwy.
  - Teifi bridge, Cardigan.

== Arts and literature ==
=== New books ===
- John Dyer - Grongar Hill (included in Richard Savage’s Miscellaneous Poems and Translations by Several Hands)
- Moses Williams (ed.) - Repertorium Poeticum

== Births ==
- 26 March - Richard Myddelton, politician (died 1795)
- 14 June - Thomas Pennant, traveller and writer (died 1798)
- 30 July - William Jones of Nayland, clergyman and author (died 1800)
- June - William Jones, poet, antiquary and radical (died 1795)
- date unknown - Sarah Gwynne (daughter of Marmaduke Gwynne), future wife of Charles Wesley (died 1822)
- probable - Edward Edwards, clergyman and academic (died 1783)

== Deaths ==
- 25 January - Rowland Gwynne, politician, 67
- 3 October - Edward Stradling, politician, 27
- date unknown - Thomas Williams, clergyman and translator, 68
