= 1725 in Wales =

- Centuries: 16th; 17th; 18th; 19th; 20th
- Decades: 1700s; 1710s; 1720s; 1730s; 1740s
- See also: List of years in Wales; Timeline of Welsh history 1725 in Great Britain Scotland Elsewhere

This article is about the particular significance of the year 1725 to Wales and its people.

== Incumbents ==
- Lord Lieutenant of North Wales (Lord Lieutenant of Anglesey, Caernarvonshire, Denbighshire, Flintshire, Merionethshire, Montgomeryshire) – Hugh Cholmondeley, 1st Earl of Cholmondeley (until 18 January); George Cholmondeley, 2nd Earl of Cholmondeley (from 7 April)
- Lord Lieutenant of Glamorgan – vacant until 1729
- Lord Lieutenant of Brecknockshire and Lord Lieutenant of Monmouthshire – Sir William Morgan of Tredegar
- Lord Lieutenant of Cardiganshire – John Vaughan, 2nd Viscount Lisburne
- Lord Lieutenant of Carmarthenshire – vacant until 1755
- Lord Lieutenant of Pembrokeshire – Sir Arthur Owen, 3rd Baronet
- Lord Lieutenant of Radnorshire – James Brydges, 1st Duke of Chandos
- Bishop of Bangor – William Baker
- Bishop of Llandaff – Robert Clavering (from 2 January)
- Bishop of St Asaph – John Wynne
- Bishop of St Davids – Richard Smalbroke (from 3 February)

== Events ==
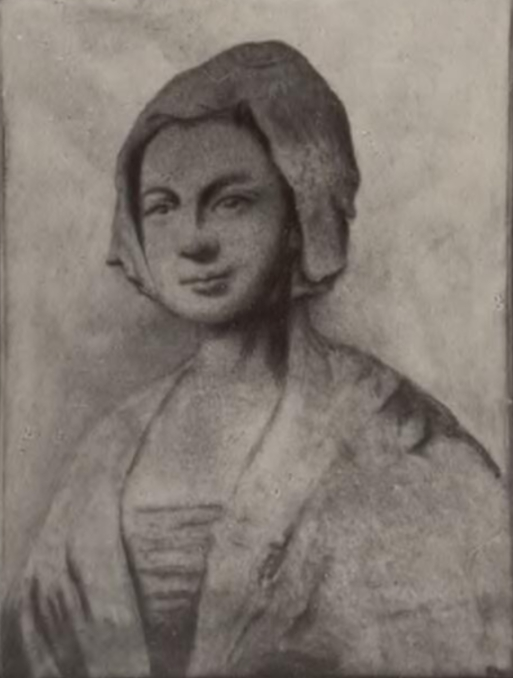
Ann Thomas, the "Maid of Cefn Ydfa"

- 7 April - George Cholmondeley, 2nd Earl of Cholmondeley, succeeds his late brother as Lord Lieutenant of North Wales.
- 4 May - Ann Thomas (the "Maid of Cefn Ydfa") marries Anthony Maddocks.
- date unknown
  - Silvanus Bevan is elected a Fellow of the Royal Society on the recommendation of Sir Isaac Newton.
  - Sir John Philipps, 6th Baronet, marries Elizabeth Shepherd.
  - Matthew Maddox becomes organist of St David's Cathedral.

== Arts and literature ==
=== New books ===
- Dafydd Lewis - Golwg ar y Byd
- William Lewis & Evan Pryce - Maddeuant i'r Edifairiol

== Births ==
- 28 March - William Morgan (of Tredegar, younger), politician (died 1763)
- May - Llewellin Penrose, painter and writer (died 1791)
- 7 September - Francis Homfray, industrialist (died 1798)
- date unknown - Michael Lort, clergyman, academic and antiquary (died 1790)

== Deaths ==
- 18 January - Hugh Cholmondeley, 1st Earl of Cholmondeley, Lord Lieutenant of North Wales, 62
- 20 July - Edward Jeffreys, 55, judge
- 25 July - Rev Thomas Griffith, 80, first pastor of Welsh Tract Baptist Church, Delaware, USA.
- 29 November - William Jones, 49, Principal of Jesus College, Oxford.
- 15 December - Francis Edwardes, politician
- date unknown - Silvanus Bevan, burgess of Swansea
