= 1724 in Wales =

- Centuries: 16th; 17th; 18th; 19th; 20th
- Decades: 1700s; 1710s; 1720s; 1730s; 1740s
- See also: List of years in Wales; Timeline of Welsh history 1724 in Great Britain Scotland Elsewhere

This article is about the particular significance of the year 1724 to Wales and its people.

== Incumbents ==
- Lord Lieutenant of North Wales (Lord Lieutenant of Anglesey, Caernarvonshire, Denbighshire, Flintshire, Merionethshire, Montgomeryshire) – Hugh Cholmondeley, 1st Earl of Cholmondeley
- Lord Lieutenant of Glamorgan – vacant until 1729
- Lord Lieutenant of Brecknockshire and Lord Lieutenant of Monmouthshire – Sir William Morgan of Tredegar
- Lord Lieutenant of Cardiganshire – John Vaughan, 2nd Viscount Lisburne
- Lord Lieutenant of Carmarthenshire – vacant until 1755
- Lord Lieutenant of Pembrokeshire – Sir Arthur Owen, 3rd Baronet
- Lord Lieutenant of Radnorshire – James Brydges, 1st Duke of Chandos
- Bishop of Bangor – William Baker
- Bishop of Llandaff – John Tyler (until 8 July)
- Bishop of St Asaph – John Wynne
- Bishop of St Davids – Richard Smalbroke (from 3 February)

== Events ==
- 14 September - Robert Clavering, a canon of Christ Church, Oxford, is nominated to succeed John Tyler as Bishop of Llandaff.
- The Shire Hall, Monmouth, is built.
- A charity school is built at Caerleon as the result of a bequest from Charles Williams.
- The title of Baron Bergavenny is inherited by William Nevill.

== Arts and literature ==
=== New books ===
- William Wynne - The Life of Sir Leoline Jenkins

== Births ==
- 26 April (baptised) - Joshua Eddowes, printer and bookseller (died 1811)
- 17 May - Gabriel Jones, Welsh American lawyer, legislator, court clerk and civil servant (died 1806)
- 22 September - John Parry, lawyer and politician (died 1797)
- 4 December - Princess Louise of Wales, daughter of the Prince and Princess of Wales (died 1751)
- date unknown - George Rice, politician (died 1779)

== Deaths ==
- 8 January - Mary Herbert, Marchioness of Powis, age unknown
- 22 March - John Evans, Bishop of Bangor and Meath, 73?
- 1 June - Erasmus Saunders, clergyman, 54?
- 4 June - Richard Bulkeley, 4th Viscount Bulkeley, 41
- 8 July - John Tyler, Bishop of Llandaff, 84
- 15 December - Stephen Parry, MP for Cardigan Boroughs, 49
- date unknown - Jeremiah Jones, independent tutor and biblical critic, 30/31
