= 1721 in Wales =

- Centuries: 16th; 17th; 18th; 19th; 20th
- Decades: 1700s; 1710s; 1720s; 1730s; 1740s
- See also: List of years in Wales; Timeline of Welsh history 1721 in Great Britain Scotland Elsewhere

This article is about the particular significance of the year 1721 to Wales and its people.

== Incumbents ==
- Lord Lieutenant of North Wales (Lord Lieutenant of Anglesey, Caernarvonshire, Denbighshire, Flintshire, Merionethshire, Montgomeryshire) – Hugh Cholmondeley, 1st Earl of Cholmondeley
- Lord Lieutenant of Glamorgan – vacant until 1729
- Lord Lieutenant of Brecknockshire and Lord Lieutenant of Monmouthshire – Sir William Morgan of Tredegar (from 7 March)
- Lord Lieutenant of Cardiganshire – John Vaughan, 1st Viscount Lisburne (until 20 March); John Vaughan, 2nd Viscount Lisburne (from 21 March)
- Lord Lieutenant of Carmarthenshire – vacant until 1755
- Lord Lieutenant of Pembrokeshire – Sir Arthur Owen, 3rd Baronet
- Lord Lieutenant of Radnorshire – Thomas Coningsby, 1st Earl Coningsby (until 11 September);James Brydges, 1st Duke of Chandos (from 11 September)
- Bishop of Bangor – Benjamin Hoadly (until 7 November); Richard Reynolds (from 3 December)
- Bishop of Llandaff – John Tyler
- Bishop of St Asaph – John Wynne
- Bishop of St Davids – Adam Ottley

== Events ==
- 11 January – Printer Isaac Carter marries Ann Lewis at Cenarth.
- May – Prince William, the youngest child of the Prince and Princess of Wales, is taken ill with suspected smallpox; it turns out to be a false alarm, but inoculation becomes popular among aristocratic families as well as the royal family.
- 30 December – Bridget Vaughan marries Arthur Bevan, a barrister.

== Arts and literature ==
=== New books ===
- Ellis Pugh – Annerch ir Cymru (first Welsh book published in America)
- John Prichard Prys – Difyrwch Crefyddol

== Births ==
- 17 March – Jonathan Hughes, poet (died 1805)
- 30 November – John Egerton, bishop of Bangor (died 1787)
- date unknown – John Walters, lexicographer
- probable – Hugh Williams, Anglican priest and writer (died 1779)

== Deaths ==
- 20 March – John Vaughan, 1st Viscount Lisburne, Lord Lieutenant of Cardiganshire and former MP for Cardiganshire, 53
- 8 July – Elihu Yale, American-born East India merchant and benefactor of Yale University, 72 (died in London)
- 28 July – Sir Edward Williams, MP, 61
- 3 September – Sir William Glynne, 2nd Baronet, 58
- 5 September – Thomas Edwards, orientalist, 69
