= 1722 in Wales =

- Centuries: 16th; 17th; 18th; 19th; 20th
- Decades: 1700s; 1710s; 1720s; 1730s; 1740s
- See also: List of years in Wales; Timeline of Welsh history 1722 in Great Britain Scotland Elsewhere

This article is about the particular significance of the year 1722 to Wales and its people.

== Incumbents ==
- Lord Lieutenant of North Wales (Lord Lieutenant of Anglesey, Caernarvonshire, Denbighshire, Flintshire, Merionethshire, Montgomeryshire) – Hugh Cholmondeley, 1st Earl of Cholmondeley
- Lord Lieutenant of Glamorgan – vacant until 1729
- Lord Lieutenant of Brecknockshire and Lord Lieutenant of Monmouthshire – Sir William Morgan of Tredegar (from 7 March)
- Lord Lieutenant of Cardiganshire – John Vaughan, 1st Viscount Lisburne (until 20 March); John Vaughan, 2nd Viscount Lisburne (from 21 March)
- Lord Lieutenant of Carmarthenshire – vacant until 1755
- Lord Lieutenant of Pembrokeshire – Sir Arthur Owen, 3rd Baronet
- Lord Lieutenant of Radnorshire – James Brydges, 1st Duke of Chandos (from 11 September)
- Bishop of Bangor – Richard Reynolds
- Bishop of Llandaff – John Tyler
- Bishop of St Asaph – John Wynne
- Bishop of St Davids – Adam Ottley

== Events ==
- February - Jane Brereton's husband Thomas drowns in the River Dee at Saltney; following his death, she returns to live in Wrexham.
- 9 May - At the conclusion of the general election, new MPs for Welsh constituencies include Sir William Owen, 4th Baronet (Pembroke Boroughs); Francis Edwardes (Haverfordwest) and Sir William Morgan for Brecon and Monmouthshire.
- June - William Wotton returns to London, where he continues to work on his Leges Wallicae, a translation of the old laws of Wales.

== Arts and literature ==
=== New books ===
- Dwysfawr Rym Buchedd Grefyddol

== Births ==
- 9 May - Morgan Edwards, Baptist historian (died 1795)
- date unknown
  - Thomas Crofts, priest, Fellow of the Royal Society, traveller and book-collector (died 1781)
  - Rowland Jones, lawyer and philologist (died 1774)
- probable
  - James Relly, Methodist minister (died 1778)
  - Hugh Williams, clergyman and writer (died 1779)

== Deaths ==
- 10 February - Bartholomew Roberts, pirate ("Black Bart"), 39 (in battle)
- 16 November - John Vaughan, reformer, 59
- 16 December - Abel Morgan, Baptist minister, pastor of Pennepack Baptist Church in Philadelphia, 49
