= 1717 in Wales =

- Centuries: 16th; 17th; 18th; 19th; 20th
- Decades: 1690s; 1700s; 1710s; 1720s; 1730s
- See also: List of years in Wales; Timeline of Welsh history 1717 in Great Britain Scotland Elsewhere

This article is about the particular significance of the year 1717 to Wales and its people.

== Incumbents ==
- Lord Lieutenant of North Wales (Lord Lieutenant of Anglesey, Caernarvonshire, Denbighshire, Flintshire, Merionethshire, Montgomeryshire) – Hugh Cholmondeley, 1st Earl of Cholmondeley
- Lord Lieutenant of Glamorgan – vacant until 1729
- Lord Lieutenant of Brecknockshire and Lord Lieutenant of Monmouthshire – John Morgan (of Rhiwpera)
- Lord Lieutenant of Cardiganshire – John Vaughan, 1st Viscount Lisburne
- Lord Lieutenant of Carmarthenshire – vacant until 1755
- Lord Lieutenant of Pembrokeshire – Sir Arthur Owen, 3rd Baronet
- Lord Lieutenant of Radnorshire – Thomas Coningsby, 1st Earl Coningsby
- Bishop of Bangor – Benjamin Hoadly
- Bishop of Llandaff – John Tyler
- Bishop of St Asaph – John Wynne
- Bishop of St Davids – Adam Ottley

== Events ==
- 31 March - In the presence of King George I of Great Britain, Benjamin Hoadly, Bishop of Bangor, gives a sermon on "The Nature of the Kingdom of Christ", beginning the Bangorian Controversy.
- 19 September - Japanning of tinplate begins at Pontypool.
- date unknown
  - The Lower Swansea valley's first copper smelting works is opened by John Lane and John Pollard (possibly his step father-in-law) at Llangyfelach, Landore.
  - Welsh-born David Lloyd is appointed Chief Justice of the supreme court of Pennsylvania.

== Arts and literature ==
=== New books ===
==== English language ====
- James Davies – Particular Thoughts on Religion
- Benjamin Hoadly – The Nature of the Kingdom, or Church of Christ

==== Welsh language ====
- Meddylieu Neillduol ar Grefydd
- Moses Williams – Cofrestr o'r holl lyfrau printiedig gan mwyaf a gyfansoddwyd yn yr iaith Gymraeg (first-ever catalogue of Welsh printed books)

== Births ==
- 11 February - William Williams (Pantycelyn), poet, hymn-writer and religious leader (died 1791)
- 13 November - Prince George William, first child born to the new Prince and Princess of Wales, George and Caroline, since their arrival in Britain (died 1718)

== Deaths ==
- 20 May - John Trevor, politician, 80?
- 3 June - Thomas Watson, former Bishop of St David's, 80
- 30 August - William Lloyd, former Bishop of St Asaph, 90
- date unknown - William Robinson, MP, about 50

== See also ==
- 1717 in Scotland
