= 1723 in Wales =

- Centuries: 16th; 17th; 18th; 19th; 20th
- Decades: 1700s; 1710s; 1720s; 1730s; 1740s
- See also: List of years in Wales; Timeline of Welsh history 1723 in Great Britain Scotland Elsewhere

This article is about the particular significance of the year 1723 to Wales and its people.

== Incumbents ==
- Lord Lieutenant of North Wales (Lord Lieutenant of Anglesey, Caernarvonshire, Denbighshire, Flintshire, Merionethshire, Montgomeryshire) – Hugh Cholmondeley, 1st Earl of Cholmondeley
- Lord Lieutenant of Glamorgan – vacant until 1729
- Lord Lieutenant of Brecknockshire and Lord Lieutenant of Monmouthshire – Sir William Morgan of Tredegar
- Lord Lieutenant of Cardiganshire – John Vaughan, 2nd Viscount Lisburne
- Lord Lieutenant of Carmarthenshire – vacant until 1755
- Lord Lieutenant of Pembrokeshire – Sir Arthur Owen, 3rd Baronet
- Lord Lieutenant of Radnorshire – James Brydges, 1st Duke of Chandos
- Bishop of Bangor – Richard Reynolds (until 17 June) William Baker (from 11 August)
- Bishop of Llandaff – John Tyler
- Bishop of St Asaph – John Wynne
- Bishop of St Davids – Adam Ottley (until 3 October)

== Events ==
- 7 May - Lewis Morris arrives in London from Anglesey.
- October - Following the death of Adam Ottley, bishop of St Davids, while in office, Richard Smalbroke, Treasurer of Llandaff, is selected as his successor.
- date unknown - The roles of Lord Lieutenant of Brecknockshire and Custos Rotulorum of Brecknockshire are merged.

== Arts and literature ==
=== New books ===
- Henry Rowlands - Mona Antiqua Restaurata
- Christmas Samuel - Llun Agrippa

== Births ==
- 1 January - Goronwy Owen, poet (died 1769)
- 23 February - Richard Price, philosopher (died 1791)
- 5 March - Princess Mary of Wales, daughter of the Prince and Princess of Wales (died 1772)
- August - Sir Richard Perryn, judge (died 1803)

== Deaths ==
- 28 April - Sir John Williams, 2nd Baronet, of Eltham, English-born politician of Welsh parentage, 69
- 31 May - William Baxter, classical scholar, 72
- 4 August - William Fleetwood, Bishop of St Asaph 1704-1708, 67
- 3 October - Adam Ottley, Bishop of St Davids, 68
- 21 November - Henry Rowlands, antiquary, 68
- 10 December - Thomas Mansel, 1st Baron Mansel, politician, about 55
- 28 December - Sir Charles Lloyd, 1st Baronet, of Milfield, politician, 61
