= 1716 in Wales =

- Centuries: 16th; 17th; 18th; 19th; 20th
- Decades: 1690s; 1700s; 1710s; 1720s; 1730s
- See also: List of years in Wales; Timeline of Welsh history 1716 in Great Britain Scotland Elsewhere

This article is about the particular significance of the year 1716 to Wales and its people.

== Incumbents ==
- Lord Lieutenant of North Wales (Lord Lieutenant of Anglesey, Caernarvonshire, Denbighshire, Flintshire, Merionethshire, Montgomeryshire) – Hugh Cholmondeley, 1st Earl of Cholmondeley
- Lord Lieutenant of Glamorgan – vacant
- Lord Lieutenant of Brecknockshire and Lord Lieutenant of Monmouthshire – John Morgan (of Rhiwpera)
- Lord Lieutenant of Cardiganshire – John Vaughan, 1st Viscount Lisburne
- Lord Lieutenant of Carmarthenshire – vacant
- Lord Lieutenant of Pembrokeshire – Sir Arthur Owen, 3rd Baronet
- Lord Lieutenant of Radnorshire – Thomas Coningsby, 1st Earl Coningsby
- Bishop of Bangor – John Evans (until January) Benjamin Hoadly (from 18 March)
- Bishop of Llandaff – John Tyler
- Bishop of St Asaph – John Wynne
- Bishop of St Davids – Adam Ottley

== Events ==
- January John Evans, Bishop of Bangor, is translated to Meath in Ireland, leaving Wales without any Welsh-speaking bishops for a prolonged period.
- 27 July Griffith Jones becomes rector of Llanddowror, under the patronage of his brother-in-law Sir John Philipps, 4th Baronet.
- 9 November – In London, Caroline of Ansbach, Princess of Wales, gives birth to a stillborn son, Prince Augustus George of Wales.

== Arts and literature ==
=== New books ===
- Myles Davies – Athenae Britannicae (six vols., London)
- Welsh translation of works by Tertullian and Cyprian, probably by John Morgan of Matchin

== Births ==
- date unknown – Henry Owen, theologian (died 1795)
- probable – Howel Davies, Methodist clergyman (died 1770)

== Deaths ==
- 26 January – Daniel Williams, theologian, 72?
- 8 May – Thomas Allgood I, originator of the japanning industry at Pontypool and Usk
- 29 June – Richard Lucas, clergyman and writer, 65
- 29 September – David Edwards, Independent minister, 56
- date unknown – Howell Powell, Congregational minister

== See also ==
- 1716 in Scotland
