= 1712 in Wales =

- Centuries: 16th; 17th; 18th; 19th; 20th
- Decades: 1690s; 1700s; 1710s; 1720s; 1730s
- See also: List of years in Wales; Timeline of Welsh history 1712 in Great Britain Scotland Elsewhere

This article is about the particular significance of the year 1712 to Wales and its people.

== Incumbents ==
- Lord Lieutenant of North Wales (Lord Lieutenant of Anglesey, Caernarvonshire, Denbighshire, Flintshire, Merionethshire, Montgomeryshire) – Hugh Cholmondeley, 1st Earl of Cholmondeley
- Lord Lieutenant of South Wales (Lord Lieutenant of Glamorgan, Brecknockshire, Cardiganshire, Carmarthenshire, Monmouthshire, Pembrokeshire, Radnorshire) – Thomas Herbert, 8th Earl of Pembroke
- Bishop of Bangor – John Evans
- Bishop of Llandaff – John Tyler
- Bishop of St Asaph – William Fleetwood
- Bishop of St Davids – Philip Bisse

== Events ==
- 1 January
  - Thomas Mansel, 5th Baronet, becomes 1st Baron Mansel.
  - Thomas Trevor is raised to the peerage as 1st Baron Trevor of Bromham.
  - Thomas Windsor, son of the Earl of Plymouth, is created Baron Mountjoy. Windsor, the second husband of Charlotte Jeffreys, daughter of Philip Herbert, 7th Earl of Pembroke, would sell much of his family's Welsh property, but their Glamorgan estates would pass through the marriage of a descendant, Charlotte Hickman-Windsor, to John Stuart, 1st Marquess of Bute.
- July - On the death of its Principal Jonathan Edwards, Jesus College, Oxford, inherits his extensive library. Edwards is buried in the college chapel, whose restoration is funded by another bequest in his will.
- August - Jonathan Edwards is replaced as Principal of Jesus by John Wynne, who has the support of the college Visitor, the Earl of Pembroke.
- October - Erasmus Lewis is appointed "provost-marshall-general in the Barbadoes".

== Arts and literature ==
=== New books ===
- The series of Welsh Almanacks printed by Thomas Jones is completed. (Jones dies the following year.)
- Robert Nelson - Cydymaith i Ddyddiau Gwylion ac Ymprydiau Eglwys Loegr (translation by Thomas Williams of A Companion for the Festivals and Fasts of the Church of England)

== Births ==
- January - David Owen, harpist (died 1741)
- unknown date - Henry Thomas, Methodist exhorter and Independent minister (died 1802)

== Deaths ==
- 20 July - Jonathan Edwards, theologian and academic, 83
- 12 September - Sir Thomas Williams, 1st Baronet, about 90
- 20 November - Humphrey Humphreys, bishop, 63
- date unknown - Nicholas Bagenal, MP for Anglesey, about 83

== See also ==
- 1712 in Scotland
