= 1720 in Wales =

- Centuries: 16th; 17th; 18th; 19th; 20th
- Decades: 1700s; 1710s; 1720s; 1730s; 1740s
- See also: List of years in Wales; Timeline of Welsh history 1720 in Great Britain Scotland Elsewhere

This article is about the particular significance of the year 1720 to Wales and its people.

== Incumbents ==
- Lord Lieutenant of North Wales (Lord Lieutenant of Anglesey, Caernarvonshire, Denbighshire, Flintshire, Merionethshire, Montgomeryshire) – Hugh Cholmondeley, 1st Earl of Cholmondeley
- Lord Lieutenant of Glamorgan – vacant until 1729
- Lord Lieutenant of Brecknockshire and Lord Lieutenant of Monmouthshire – John Morgan (of Rhiwpera) (until 7 March); Sir William Morgan of Tredegar (from 7 March)
- Lord Lieutenant of Cardiganshire – John Vaughan, 1st Viscount Lisburne
- Lord Lieutenant of Carmarthenshire – vacant until 1755
- Lord Lieutenant of Pembrokeshire – Sir Arthur Owen, 3rd Baronet
- Lord Lieutenant of Radnorshire – Thomas Coningsby, 1st Earl Coningsby
- Bishop of Bangor – Benjamin Hoadly
- Bishop of Llandaff – John Tyler
- Bishop of St Asaph – John Wynne
- Bishop of St Davids – Adam Ottley

== Events ==
- March - Sir William Morgan of Tredegar replaces John Morgan of Rhiwpera as Lord Lieutenant of Monmouthshire.
- 21 August - Elisha Beadles sends an account of the progress of the Quaker movement in South Wales to London for consideration by the "Meeting for Sufferings".
- 20 November - A violent storm damages the northwest tower of Llandaff Cathedral. The southwest tower, reported in 1719 to be in a state of collapse, is further damaged, and a programme of restoration work begins.
- date unknown
  - Charles Hanbury Williams succeeds to the estate of his godfather, and takes the surname Williams.
  - Llandaff Cathedral is reported as being in a state of collapse.
  - The wrought-iron gates of St Giles' Church, Wrexham, made by the Davies brothers of Bersham, are erected.

== Arts and literature ==
=== New books ===
- Robert Roberts - A duo-glott-exposition of the Creed, the ten Commandments and the Lords Prayer, calculated for the borders of England and Wales, but particularly for the use of the parish of Chirk, whose inhabitants are partly Welsh and partly English, by R. R. A. M. Vicar of the said parish of Chirk

== Births ==
- date unknown
  - Ralph Griffiths, journalist (died 1803)
  - Roger Mostyn, canon of Windsor (died 1775)
  - Sir Noah Thomas, royal physician (died 1792)

== Deaths ==
- 7 March - John Morgan (of Rhiwpera), politician, 49
- April/May - Robert Wynne, clergyman and poet
- 22 August - Sir Thomas Powell, 1st Baronet, politician, about 55
- 29 August - Charles Williams, merchant, 87
  - probable - William Evans, Presbyterian minister and writer
