= 1718 in Wales =

- Centuries: 16th; 17th; 18th; 19th; 20th
- Decades: 1690s; 1700s; 1710s; 1720s; 1730s
- See also: List of years in Wales; Timeline of Welsh history 1718 in Great Britain Scotland Elsewhere

This article is about the particular significance of the year 1718 to Wales and its people.

== Incumbents ==
- Lord Lieutenant of North Wales (Lord Lieutenant of Anglesey, Caernarvonshire, Denbighshire, Flintshire, Merionethshire, Montgomeryshire) – Hugh Cholmondeley, 1st Earl of Cholmondeley
- Lord Lieutenant of Glamorgan – vacant until 1729
- Lord Lieutenant of Brecknockshire and Lord Lieutenant of Monmouthshire – John Morgan (of Rhiwpera)
- Lord Lieutenant of Cardiganshire – John Vaughan, 1st Viscount Lisburne
- Lord Lieutenant of Carmarthenshire – vacant until 1755
- Lord Lieutenant of Pembrokeshire – Sir Arthur Owen, 3rd Baronet
- Lord Lieutenant of Radnorshire – Thomas Coningsby, 1st Earl Coningsby
- Bishop of Bangor – Benjamin Hoadly
- Bishop of Llandaff – John Tyler
- Bishop of St Asaph – John Wynne
- Bishop of St Davids – Adam Ottley

== Events ==
- February - Prince George William of Wales falls ill (later diagnosed as a heart disease); his parents, the Prince and Princess of Wales, are allowed by King George I to visit him at Kensington Palace, despite having been banished from the royal presence a few months earlier.
- 11 July - Howell Davis, mate of the Cadogan, is captured by Edward England and decides join the pirates. Davis would subsequently capture another Welsh sailor, Bartholomew Roberts, and turn him to piracy.
- 9 November - Theophilus Evans is ordained by the Bishop of St David's.
- date unknown - The first permanent printing press in Wales is established at Adpar, Cardiganshire.

== Arts and literature ==
=== New books ===
- Ifan Gruffudd & Samuel Williams - Pedwar o Ganuau
- Thomas Taylor - The Principality of Wales exactly described... (the first atlas of Wales to be published)
- Alban Thomas - Cân o Senn i'w hen Feistr Tobacco

== Births ==
- July - William Jones, Methodist exhorter (died c.1773)
- date unknown - Sir Hugh Williams, 8th Baronet (died 1794)

== Deaths ==
- 17 February - Prince George William of Wales, the second son of the Prince and Princess of Wales, aged three months
- 30 April - Sir James Morgan, 4th Baronet,
- 1 May - Robert Daniell, coloniser of The Carolinas, 71 or 72
- 26 December - Mary Steele, wife of Sir Richard Steele, 40
- date unknown
  - Sir Edward Broughton of Marchwiel, former High Sheriff of Denbighshire
  - William Evans, dissenting minister
  - Sir William Myddelton, 4th Baronet, of Chirk

== See also ==
- 1718 in Scotland
