= 1783 in Scotland =

- Centuries: 16th; 17th; 18th; 19th; 20th
- Decades: 1760s; 1770s; 1780s; 1790s; 1800s
- See also: List of years in Scotland; Timeline of Scottish history 1783 in: Great Britain • Wales • Elsewhere

Events from the year 1783 in Scotland.

== Incumbents ==
=== Law officers ===
- Lord Advocate – Henry Dundas; then Henry Erskine
- Solicitor General for Scotland – Alexander Murray; then Ilay Campbell jointly with Alexander Wight

=== Judiciary ===
- Lord President of the Court of Session – Lord Arniston, the younger
- Lord Justice General – The Viscount Stormont
- Lord Justice Clerk – Lord Barskimming

== Events ==
- 1 January – Glasgow Chamber of Commerce is founded by Patrick Colquhoun, the first in Britain.
- 27 January – The Herald newspaper begins publication as the weekly Glasgow Advertiser (with news of the Peace of Paris); it will become the longest continually-published daily in Britain.
- 29 March – the Society of Antiquaries of Scotland and the Royal Society of Edinburgh are chartered.
- Halbeath Railway opens from the colliery at Halbeath (in the Fife Coalfield) to the harbour at Inverkeithing.
- Elspeth Buchan proclaims herself in Irvine as possessed of heavenly powers, leading to the formation of a Society of Buchanites.

== Births ==
- 5 April – Andrew Geddes, portrait painter and etcher (died 1844 in London)
- 8 April – John Claudius Loudon, horticulturalist (died 1843 in London)
- 24 April – James Lindsay, 24th Earl of Crawford (died 1869 in England)
- 11 June – James Baillie Fraser, travel writer (died 1856)
- 15 June – Donald Mackenzie, explorer in North America (died 1851 in the United States)
- 27 June – Adam Anderson, physicist (died 1846)
- 6 September – George Hogarth, newspaper editor, music critic, musicologist and father-in-law of Charles Dickens (died 1870 in London)
- 22 October – James Henry Keith Stewart, Tory Member of Parliament (died 1836)
- John Finlaison, actuary (died 1860 in London)
- William Glen, poet (died 1826)
- Peter Grant (Pàdraig Grannd nan Oran), Baptist minister and songwriter in Gaelic (died 1867)
- Norman Macleod (Caraid nan Gaidheal), Church of Scotland minister and writer in Gaelic (died 1862)
- Richard Poole, physician, psychiatrist, and phrenologist (died 1871)

== Deaths ==
- 30 March – William Hunter, anatomist (born 1718; died in London)
- 2 June – Charles Spalding, confectioner and diver (born 1738; died on dive in Dublin Bay)
- 27 August – John Glassford, tobacco merchant (born 1715)

== The arts ==
- Robert Burns writes his poem "Now Westlin' Winds" or "Composed in August".
- The Glasgow engraving and publishing firm J. Lumsden and Son, which becomes known for children's books, is founded.
