= 1714 in Wales =

- Centuries: 16th; 17th; 18th; 19th; 20th
- Decades: 1690s; 1700s; 1710s; 1720s; 1730s
- See also: List of years in Wales; Timeline of Welsh history 1714 in Great Britain Scotland Elsewhere

This article is about the particular significance of the year 1714 to Wales and its people.

== Incumbents ==
- Lord Lieutenant of North Wales (Lord Lieutenant of Anglesey, Caernarvonshire, Denbighshire, Flintshire, Merionethshire, Montgomeryshire) – Other Windsor, 2nd Earl of Plymouth (until 21 October); Hugh Cholmondeley, 1st Earl of Cholmondeley (from 21 October);
- Lord Lieutenant of South Wales (Lord Lieutenant of Glamorgan, Brecknockshire, Cardiganshire, Carmarthenshire, Monmouthshire, Pembrokeshire, Radnorshire) – Thomas Herbert, 8th Earl of Pembroke
- Bishop of Bangor – John Evans
- Bishop of Llandaff – John Tyler
- Bishop of St Asaph – William Fleetwood (until 11 January) John Wynne (from 11 January)
- Bishop of St Davids – Adam Ottley

== Events ==
- 8 May - Adam Ottley, Bishop of St David's, complains that Griffith Jones (Llanddowror) has been "going about preaching on week days in Churches, Churchyards, and sometimes on the mountains, to hundreds of auditors".
- 1 August - George I of Great Britain becomes king, and soon replaces the Lord Lieutenant of North Wales, the Earl of Plymouth with his favoured candidate, the previous incumbent, the Earl of Cholmondeley. The first bishop he appoints is John Wynne, principal of Jesus College, Oxford, who becomes Bishop of St Asaph, but does not take up his new position until the following year, preferring the academic life.
- September 27 - Prince George, son of King George I, is invested as Prince of Wales. His wife, Caroline of Ansbach, becomes the first Princess of Wales to receive the title at the same time as her husband and the first Princess of Wales for over two hundred years.
- October - The new Princess of Wales arrives in Britain with two of her children.
- date unknown
  - Erasmus Saunders marries the daughter of Humphrey Lloyd of Aberbechan.
  - Following the death of Robert Jeffreys, a descendant of George Jeffreys, 1st Baron Jeffreys, the last member of the Jeffreys family to reside at Acton Hall, Wrexham, the estate passes into the hands of a brother-in-law, Philip Egerton.

== Arts and literature ==
=== New books ===
==== English language ====
- James Davies (Iaco ap Dewi) - Daily Communion with God (translation)
- Sir John Doderidge - An Historical Account of the Ancient and Modern State of the Principality of Wales...

==== Welsh language ====
- William Dyer - Cyfoeth i'r Cymru
- John Morgan of Matchin - Myfyrdodau bucheddol ar y pedwar peth diweddaf
- Rhys Prydderch/Christmas Samuel - Gemau Doethineb

== Births ==
- 23 January - Howell Harris, Methodist leader (died 1773)
- March - Edward Richard, schoolmaster and poet (died 1777)
- 1 August – Richard Wilson, painter (died 1782)

== Deaths ==
- 24 May - Henry Somerset, 2nd Duke of Beaufort, Welsh-born landowner, 30
- 22 June - Matthew Henry, Presbyterian minister, 51
- 8 or 10 December - David Parry, scholar, assistant to Edward Lhuyd, about 30
- 31 December - John Wynne, industrialist, 64
