= 1719 in Wales =

- Centuries: 16th; 17th; 18th; 19th; 20th
- Decades: 1690s; 1700s; 1710s; 1720s; 1730s
- See also: List of years in Wales; Timeline of Welsh history 1719 in Great Britain Scotland Elsewhere

This article is about the particular significance of the year 1719 to Wales and its people.

== Incumbents ==
- Lord Lieutenant of North Wales (Lord Lieutenant of Anglesey, Caernarvonshire, Denbighshire, Flintshire, Merionethshire, Montgomeryshire) – Hugh Cholmondeley, 1st Earl of Cholmondeley
- Lord Lieutenant of Glamorgan – vacant until 1729
- Lord Lieutenant of Brecknockshire and Lord Lieutenant of Monmouthshire – John Morgan (of Rhiwpera)
- Lord Lieutenant of Cardiganshire – John Vaughan, 1st Viscount Lisburne
- Lord Lieutenant of Carmarthenshire – vacant until 1755
- Lord Lieutenant of Pembrokeshire – Sir Arthur Owen, 3rd Baronet
- Lord Lieutenant of Radnorshire – Thomas Coningsby, 1st Earl Coningsby
- Bishop of Bangor – Benjamin Hoadly
- Bishop of Llandaff – John Tyler
- Bishop of St Asaph – John Wynne
- Bishop of St Davids – Adam Ottley

== Events ==
- March – The 41st (Welch) Regiment of Foot is raised by Colonel Edmund Fielding as Edmund Fielding's Regiment of Foot.
- date unknown
  - The Davies brothers of Bersham begin work on the wrought-iron gates at Chirk Castle.
  - The first permanent legal printing press in Wales is established at Adpar by Isaac Carter of Carmarthenshire. It is believed that its first two publications are Cân o Senn i’w hen Feistr Tobacco by Alban Thomas and Cân ar Fesur Triban ynghylch Cydwybod a’i Chynheddfau.
  - On the death without heirs of Sir John Wynne, the Wynnstay estate passes to Jane Thelwall, the great-granddaughter of Sir John Wynn, 1st Baronet.
  - The Welsh Charity School in London moves to Ailesbury Chapel, Clerkenwell, where it remains until about 1721.

== Arts and literature ==
=== New books ===
- Christmas Samuel – Catecism o'r Scrythur
- Eglurhad o Gatechism Byrraf y Gymanfa
- Browne Willis – Survey of Llandaff

== Births ==
- February – William Edwards, clergyman and bridge engineer (d. 1789)
- 22 February – Joshua Thomas, writer and Particular Baptist minister (d. 1797)
- 17 June – Joshua Parry, nonconformist minister and writer (d. 1776)
- 30 November – Princess Augusta of Saxe-Gotha, future Princess of Wales (d. 1772)
- date unknown – Sir Herbert Lloyd, 1st Baronet, politician (d. 1769)

== Deaths ==
- 11 January – Sir John Wynn, 5th Baronet, 90
- 4 April – Thomas Powys, judge, 70/71
- 19 June – Captain Howell Davis, pirate, ca 29
- 11 October – Samuel Jones, Dissenting minister and tutor
