= 1787 in Scotland =

- Centuries: 16th; 17th; 18th; 19th; 20th
- Decades: 1760s; 1770s; 1780s; 1790s; 1800s
- See also: List of years in Scotland; Timeline of Scottish history 1787 in: Great Britain • Wales • Elsewhere

Events from the year 1787 in Scotland.

== Incumbents ==
=== Law officers ===
- Lord Advocate – Ilay Campbell
- Solicitor General for Scotland – Robert Dundas of Arniston

=== Judiciary ===
- Lord President of the Court of Session – Lord Arniston, the younger until 13 December; then from 22 December, Lord Glenlee
- Lord Justice General – The Viscount Stormont
- Lord Justice Clerk – Lord Barskimming, then Lord Braxfield

== Events ==
- 11 January – new Assembly Rooms opened in George Street, Edinburgh.
- 27 January – Bridge of Dun completed.
- 1 February – New Club, Edinburgh, founded as a private gentlemen's club.
- June
  - Patrick Miller of Dalswinton demonstrates his design of manually-propelled paddleboat on the Firth of Forth.
  - Kennetpans Distillery begins to operate a condensing rotative stationary steam engine designed by James Watt, the first in Scotland.
- Summer – Calton weavers' strike. On 3 September, six of the Calton weavers are killed by troops.
- 1 December – Kinnaird Head Lighthouse first illuminated.
- Catrine is developed on the River Ayr around one of the first cotton mills in Scotland by Claud Alexander of Ballochmyle in partnership with David Dale.
- The Scotch Distilling Act imposes a tax on gin exported from Scotland to England.
- Kerelaw House and Tarbat House built.

== Births ==
- 7 January – Patrick Nasmyth, landscape painter (died 1831 in London)
- 11 February – Alexander Maconochie, naval officer, geographer and penal reformer (died 1860 in England)
- 14 May – Alexander Laing, "the Brechin poet" (died 1857)
- 5 November – John Richardson naturalist, explorer and naval surgeon (died 1865 in England)
- 22 November – Robert Balmer, minister of the Secession Church (died 1844)
- 17 December – John Forbes, physician (died 1861 in England)
- Susanna Hawkins, poet (died 1868)
- Hugh Maxwell, lawyer and politician in New York (died 1873 in the United States)

== Deaths ==
- 2 March – Anne Mackintosh, Jacobite (born 1723)
- 6 June – Robert Duff, naval officer (born c. 1721)
- 19 June – John Brown, theologian (born 1722)
- 5 September – John Brown, portrait-draftsman and painter in Edinburgh (born 1749)
- 27 December – Thomas Hay, 9th Earl of Kinnoull, politician (born 1710)

== The arts ==
- 17 April – the Edinburgh edition of Robert Burns' Poems, Chiefly in the Scottish Dialect is published by William Creech including a portrait of Burns by Alexander Nasmyth. The poet has great social success in the city's literary circles; 16-year-old Walter Scott meets him at the house of Adam Ferguson. Burns also writes the first version of "The Battle of Sherramuir" this year.
- 4 December – Burns meets Agnes Maclehose at a party given by Miss Erskine Nimmo.
- The Scots Musical Museum begins publication.

== Sport ==
- May – Glasgow Golf Club founded.

== See also ==
- Timeline of Scottish history
- 1787 in Great Britain
