= 1712 in Scotland =

- Centuries: 16th; 17th; 18th; 19th; 20th
- Decades: 1690s; 1700s; 1710s; 1720s; 1730s
- See also: List of years in Scotland; Timeline of Scottish history 1712 in: Great Britain • Wales • Elsewhere

Events from the year 1712 in Scotland.

== Incumbents ==
- Secretary of State for Scotland: The Earl of Mar

=== Law officers ===
- Lord Advocate – Sir James Stewart
- Solicitor General for Scotland – Thomas Kennedy jointly with Sir James Steuart, Bt.

=== Judiciary ===
- Lord President of the Court of Session – Lord North Berwick
- Lord Justice General – Lord Ilay
- Lord Justice Clerk – Lord Grange

== Events ==
- 3 March – Scottish Episcopalians Act 1711 comes into effect, leading to incorporation of the Scottish Episcopal Church.
- 1 May – the Church Patronage (Scotland) Act 1711 comes into effect.
- 3 October – warrant issued for the arrest of outlaw Rob Roy MacGregor by Sir James Stewart (Lord Advocate) at the instigation of James Graham, 1st Duke of Montrose.

== Births ==
- 12 March – Sir Hew Dalrymple, 2nd Baronet, politician (died 1790)
- 25 September – James Veitch, Lord Elliock, judge, politician and landowner (died 1793)
- 26 September – Alexander Hamilton, physician and satirical writer in colonial Maryland (died 1756)
- 8 October – Alison Cockburn, née Rutherford, poet, wit and socialite (died 1794)
- 21 October – James Steuart, economist (died 1780)
- 22 October – James Hamilton, 8th Earl of Abercorn (born, and died 1789, in England)

== Deaths ==
- 12 July – Richard Cromwell, Lord Protector of the Commonwealth of England, Scotland and Ireland 1658–59 (born 1626, and died, in England)
- 23 September – Thomas Halyburton, theologian (born 1674)
- 15 November – James Hamilton, 4th Duke of Hamilton, Premier Peer of Scotland (born 1658; killed in a celebrated duel in England)

== See also ==
- Timeline of Scottish history
