= 1786 in Wales =

- Centuries: 16th; 17th; 18th; 19th; 20th
- Decades: 1760s; 1770s; 1780s; 1790s; 1800s
- See also: List of years in Wales; Timeline of Welsh history 1786 in Great Britain Scotland Elsewhere

This article is about the particular significance of the year 1786 to Wales and its people.

== Incumbents ==
- Lord Lieutenant of Anglesey - Henry Paget
- Lord Lieutenant of Brecknockshire and Monmouthshire – Charles Morgan of Dderw
- Lord Lieutenant of Caernarvonshire - Thomas Bulkeley, 7th Viscount Bulkeley
- Lord Lieutenant of Cardiganshire – Wilmot Vaughan, 1st Earl of Lisburne
- Lord Lieutenant of Carmarthenshire – John Vaughan
- Lord Lieutenant of Denbighshire - Richard Myddelton
- Lord Lieutenant of Flintshire - Sir Roger Mostyn, 5th Baronet
- Lord Lieutenant of Glamorgan – John Stuart, Lord Mountstuart
- Lord Lieutenant of Merionethshire - Sir Watkin Williams-Wynn, 4th Baronet
- Lord Lieutenant of Montgomeryshire – George Herbert, 2nd Earl of Powis
- Lord Lieutenant of Pembrokeshire – Sir Hugh Owen, 5th Baronet (until 16 January); Richard Philipps, 1st Baron Milford (from 11 June)
- Lord Lieutenant of Radnorshire – Edward Harley, 4th Earl of Oxford and Earl Mortimer
- Bishop of Bangor – John Warren
- Bishop of Llandaff – Richard Watson
- Bishop of St Asaph – Jonathan Shipley
- Bishop of St Davids – Edward Smallwell

== Events ==
- 25 December - Plymouth ironworks is leased to Richard Hill.
- The Kinmel estate is sold to the Rev Edward Hughes for £42,000.
- Abraham Rees completes his edition of Chambers 's Encyclopaedia, and is elected a Fellow of the Royal Society in recognition of his work.
- Charles Pratt is created Earl Camden.

== Arts and literature ==
=== New books ===
- David Samwell - A Narrative of the Death of Captain James Cook
- Hester Lynch Piozzi - Anecdotes of the late Samuel Johnson, Ll.D., during the last twenty years of his life
- Helen Maria Williams - Poems

=== Music ===
- William Ellis - Ychydig o Hymnau a Chaniadau Newyddion (collection of hymns)
- Benjamin Francis - Aleluia (collection of hymns)

== Births ==
- 6 April - John Humffreys Parry, barrister and antiquary (died 1825)
- May - John Jones, printer and inventor (died 1865)
- 22 June - Ellis Evans, minister and author (died 1864)
- 22 July - John Edward Madocks, MP for Denbigh (died 1837)

== Deaths ==
- 16 January - Sir Hugh Owen, 5th Baronet, politician, about 55
- 21 January - Anthony Bacon, ironmaster, 67
- 12 March - Barbara Herbert, Countess of Powis, 51
- 2 July (bur.) - John Ystumllyn, gardener, "first well-recorded black person of North Wales"
- 16 September - Edward Parry, poet and hymn-writer, 63
