= 1797 in Wales =

- Centuries: 16th; 17th; 18th; 19th; 20th
- Decades: 1770s; 1780s; 1790s; 1800s; 1810s
- See also: List of years in Wales; Timeline of Welsh history 1797 in Great Britain Scotland Elsewhere

This article is about the particular significance of the year 1797 to Wales and its people.

== Incumbents ==
- Lord Lieutenant of Anglesey – Henry Paget
- Lord Lieutenant of Brecknockshire and Monmouthshire – Henry Somerset, 5th Duke of Beaufort
- Lord Lieutenant of Caernarvonshire – Thomas Bulkeley, 7th Viscount Bulkeley
- Lord Lieutenant of Cardiganshire – Wilmot Vaughan, 1st Earl of Lisburne
- Lord Lieutenant of Carmarthenshire – John Vaughan
- Lord Lieutenant of Denbighshire – Sir Watkin Williams-Wynn, 5th Baronet (from 4 April)
- Lord Lieutenant of Flintshire – Lloyd Kenyon, 1st Baron Kenyon
- Lord Lieutenant of Glamorgan – John Stuart, 1st Marquess of Bute
- Lord Lieutenant of Merionethshire - Sir Watkin Williams-Wynn, 5th Baronet
- Lord Lieutenant of Montgomeryshire – George Herbert, 2nd Earl of Powis
- Lord Lieutenant of Pembrokeshire – Richard Philipps, 1st Baron Milford
- Lord Lieutenant of Radnorshire – Thomas Harley
- Bishop of Bangor – John Warren
- Bishop of Llandaff – Richard Watson
- Bishop of St Asaph – Lewis Bagot
- Bishop of St Davids – William Stuart

== Events ==
- 22 February - The last invasion of Britain begins: a joint French-American force of 1,400 troops, transported on four French warships, lands near Fishguard.
- 23 February - Last invasion of Britain: The invasion force clashes with a hastily assembled group of around 500 British reservists, militia and sailors, under the command of John Campbell, 1st Baron Cawdor.
- 24 February - Last invasion of Britain: Colonel William Tate is forced into an unconditional surrender. The French warships escape capture and return to France. The prisoners are marched through Fishguard on their way to temporary imprisonment at Haverfordwest.
- 9 March - Last invasion of Britain: HMS St Fiorenzo, under the command of Sir Harry Neale and Captain John Cooke's HMS Nymphe, capture La Resistance and La Constance in the Irish Sea.
- Richard Fothergill and the Rev. Matthew Monkhouse take over Tredegar ironworks and construct a new furnace.

== Arts and literature ==
=== New books ===
==== English language ====
- Arthur Aikin - Journal of a Tour through North Wales and Part of Shropshire with Observations in Mineralogy and Other Branches of Natural History

==== Welsh language ====
- Edward Charles - Epistolau Cymraeg at y Cymry
- John Jones (Jac Glan-y-gors) - Toriad y Dydd
- Nathaniel Williams - Pregeth a Bregethwyd yn Llangloffan ar Neilltuad ... Joseph James a James Davies

== Births ==
- 11 January – Connop Thirlwall, Bishop of St David's (died 1875)
- 30 July – Harriet Windsor-Clive, 13th Baroness Windsor, philanthropist (died 1869)
- 21 August – John Iltyd Nicholl, MP and judge (died 1853)
- date unknown – John Blackwell (Alun), poet (died 1841)

== Deaths ==
- 1 June – John Walters, lexicographer, 75
- 24 May – Paul Panton, lawyer and antiquary, 70
- 25 August – Joshua Thomas, minister, 78
- 26 October – John Parry, lawyer and politician, 73
- 6 November – John Lewis, MP for Radnor, 59
