= 1713 in Wales =

- Centuries: 16th; 17th; 18th; 19th; 20th
- Decades: 1690s; 1700s; 1710s; 1720s; 1730s
- See also: List of years in Wales; Timeline of Welsh history 1713 in Great Britain Scotland Elsewhere

This article is about the particular significance of the year 1713 to Wales and its people.

== Incumbents ==
- Lord Lieutenant of North Wales (Lord Lieutenant of Anglesey, Caernarvonshire, Denbighshire, Flintshire, Merionethshire, Montgomeryshire) – Hugh Cholmondeley, 1st Earl of Cholmondeley (until 4 September); Other Windsor, 2nd Earl of Plymouth (from 4 September)
- Lord Lieutenant of South Wales (Lord Lieutenant of Glamorgan, Brecknockshire, Cardiganshire, Carmarthenshire, Monmouthshire, Pembrokeshire, Radnorshire) – Thomas Herbert, 8th Earl of Pembroke
- Bishop of Bangor – John Evans
- Bishop of Llandaff – John Tyler
- Bishop of St Asaph – William Fleetwood
- Bishop of St Davids – Philip Bisse (until 16 February); Adam Ottley (from 15 March)

== Events ==
- January - On the death of John Vaughan, 3rd Earl of Carbery (see Deaths), the Golden Grove estate in Carmarthenshire is inherited by a cousin, John Vaughan (1693–1765), who would rebuild Gelli Aur mansion.
- April - As a result of the death of Edmund Meyrick, a large bequest is left to Jesus College, Oxford, for scholarships for students from Wales.
- 21 July - Lady Anne Vaughan, heiress of the Earl of Carbery, marries Charles Powlett, 3rd Duke of Bolton.
- 12 November - Following the general election, Sir Humphrey Mackworth is replaced as MP for Cardiganshire by the Whig Thomas Johnes the elder, after a scandal involving the collapse of his Company of Mine Adventures; in the same year, forms the Company of Mineral Manufacturers which remains in business for only six years.

== Births ==
- 21 March - Francis Lewis, merchant, signatory of the United States Declaration of Independence (died 1803)
- 1 August - Richard Wilson, painter (died 1782)
- December - Josiah Tucker, economist (died 1799)
- date unknown - Sir John Glynne, 6th Baronet (died 1777)

== Deaths ==
- 12 January - John Vaughan, 3rd Earl of Carbery, owner of the Golden Grove estate in Carmarthenshire, 73
- 24 April - Edmund Meyrick, priest and educational benefactor, 77
- 15 November - Catherine Philipps (née Darcy) of Picton Castle, second wife of Sir Erasmus Philipps, 3rd Baronet, and granddaughter of Philip Stanhope, 1st Earl of Chesterfield
- 31 December - Edward Proger, politician, 92 or 95

== See also ==
- 1713 in Scotland
