= 1796 in Wales =

- Centuries: 16th; 17th; 18th; 19th; 20th
- Decades: 1770s; 1780s; 1790s; 1800s; 1810s
- See also: List of years in Wales; Timeline of Welsh history 1796 in Great Britain Scotland Elsewhere

This article is about the particular significance of the year 1796 to Wales and its people.

== Incumbents ==
- Lord Lieutenant of Anglesey - Henry Paget
- Lord Lieutenant of Brecknockshire and Monmouthshire – Henry Somerset, 5th Duke of Beaufort
- Lord Lieutenant of Caernarvonshire - Thomas Bulkeley, 7th Viscount Bulkeley
- Lord Lieutenant of Cardiganshire – Wilmot Vaughan, 1st Earl of Lisburne
- Lord Lieutenant of Carmarthenshire – John Vaughan
- Lord Lieutenant of Denbighshire – Sir Watkin Williams-Wynn, 5th Baronet (from 4 April)
- Lord Lieutenant of Flintshire – Sir Roger Mostyn, 5th Baronet (until 26 July); Lloyd Kenyon, 1st Baron Kenyon (from 9 September)
- Lord Lieutenant of Glamorgan – John Stuart, 1st Marquess of Bute
- Lord Lieutenant of Merionethshire - Sir Watkin Williams-Wynn, 5th Baronet
- Lord Lieutenant of Montgomeryshire – George Herbert, 2nd Earl of Powis
- Lord Lieutenant of Pembrokeshire – Richard Philipps, 1st Baron Milford
- Lord Lieutenant of Radnorshire – Thomas Harley
- Bishop of Bangor – John Warren
- Bishop of Llandaff – Richard Watson
- Bishop of St Asaph – Lewis Bagot
- Bishop of St Davids – William Stuart

== Events ==
- February - The main line of the Monmouthshire and Brecon Canal opens; it is 12.5 miles (20.1 km) long, and runs from Newport to Pontnewynydd, via Pontymoile, rising by 447 feet (136.3m) through 42 locks.
- 27 February - John Stuart is created Marquess of Bute.
- June - At the British general election, Richard Pennant, 1st Baron Penrhyn, backed by Bishop John Warren, challenges sitting MP Sir Robert Williams, the sitting member for Caernarvonshire; Sir Robert is easily re-elected.
- John Wilkinson blows in blast furnace No. 1 on the site that becomes Brymbo Steelworks.

== Arts and literature ==
=== New books ===
- Charles Heath - The Excursion Down the Wye
- Thomas Pennant - Whiteford and Holywell
- Uvedale Price - An Essay on the Picturesque
- Anna Seward - Llangollen Vale and Other Poems
- David Williams - The History of Monmouthshire

== Births ==
- 7 January - Princess Charlotte Augusta of Wales, only child of the Prince and Princess of Wales (died 1817)
- 8 January - Eliza Constantia Campbell, author (died 1864)
- 1 March - John Jones, Talysarn, preacher (died 1857)
- 30 September - John Mytton, sportsman (died 1834)
- December - David Owen (Brutus), writer (died 1866)

== Deaths ==
- February - John Jones, organist, 70?
- 26 July - Sir Roger Mostyn, 5th Baronet, landowner and politician, 61
- 8 August - Peter Williams, Methodist writer, 63
- date unknown - Ioan Siencyn, poet
