= 1782 in Scotland =

- Centuries: 16th; 17th; 18th; 19th; 20th
- Decades: 1760s; 1770s; 1780s; 1790s; 1800s
- See also: List of years in Scotland; Timeline of Scottish history 1782 in: Great Britain • Wales • Elsewhere

Events from the year 1782 in Scotland.

== Incumbents ==
=== Law officers ===
- Lord Advocate – Henry Dundas;
- Solicitor General for Scotland – Alexander Murray

=== Judiciary ===
- Lord President of the Court of Session – Lord Arniston, the younger
- Lord Justice General – The Viscount Stormont
- Lord Justice Clerk – Lord Barskimming

== Events ==
- 23 January – local Laird George Ludovic Houston invites purchase of marked plots of land which, when built upon, form the planned town of Johnstone, to provide employment for his thread and cotton mills, and one of the latter is erected by Corse, Burns & Co.
- May – first patient admitted to Montrose Lunatic Asylum, the first such institution to be founded in Scotland, largely due to Susan Carnegie of Charleton.
- 1 July – Act of Proscription 1746 (including Dress Act) repealed, permitting wearing of Highland dress and arms.
- Muslin first woven in Scotland by James Monteith at Anderston.

== Births ==
- 2 February – James Chalmers, printer, publisher and bookseller, claimed inventor of the adhesive postage stamp (died 1853)
- 17 March – Andrew Halliday, physician, reformer and writer (died 1839)
- 16 April – William Jerdan, journalist (died 1869 in London)
- 15 August – James Smith of Jordanhill, merchant, antiquarian and architect (died 1867)
- 7 September – Susan Edmonstone Ferrier, novelist (died 1854)
- 7 October – Charles Maclaren, editor and geologist (died 1866)
- Grace Kennedy, writer of religious novels (died 1825)

== Deaths ==
- 18 January – Sir John Pringle, military physician (born 1707; died in London)
- 4 March – Margaret Lindsay Ramsay, noblewoman, second wife of Allan Ramsay (artist) (born c. 1726)
- 13 October – John Farquharson, Jesuit (born 1699)
- 10 December – Alexander Spiers, tobacco merchant
- 27 December – Henry Home, Lord Kames, advocate and philosopher (born 1697)

== The arts ==
- Oxenfoord Castle is rebuilt to designs by Robert Adam.
- Robert Burns writes the poem "Comin' Thro' the Rye".

== Sport ==
- First race run at original Hamilton Park Racecourse.
