= 1789 in Scotland =

- Centuries: 16th; 17th; 18th; 19th; 20th
- Decades: 1760s; 1770s; 1780s; 1790s; 1800s
- See also: List of years in Scotland; Timeline of Scottish history 1789 in: Great Britain • Wales • Elsewhere

Events from the year 1789 in Scotland.

== Incumbents ==
=== Law officers ===
- Lord Advocate – Ilay Campbell; then Robert Dundas of Arniston
- Solicitor General for Scotland – Robert Dundas of Arniston; then Robert Blair

=== Judiciary ===
- Lord President of the Court of Session – Lord Glenlee until 27 September; then from 26 October Lord Succoth
- Lord Justice General – The Viscount Stormont
- Lord Justice Clerk – Lord Braxfield

== Events ==
- 10 July – Scottish explorer Alexander Mackenzie reaches the Mackenzie River delta in North America.
- November – foundation stone for Old College, University of Edinburgh, laid.
- December – steamboat experiments on the Forth and Clyde Canal by Patrick Miller of Dalswinton.
- The original lighthouses at Eilean Glas on Scalpay, Outer Hebrides, and Dennis Head Old Beacon on North Ronaldsay, Orkney, are completed by Thomas Smith.
- Robert Adam designs a new house at Newliston.
- Andrew Duncan delivers the first lectures on forensic medicine in Britain, at the University of Edinburgh.
- The Aberdeen Medico-Chirurgical Society is founded by James McGrigor and James Robertson.
- Robert Burns is appointed an exciseman.
- New pump room for St Bernard's Well, Stockbridge, Edinburgh, designed by painter Alexander Nasmyth.
- John Ainslie completes and publishes his 9-sheet map of Scotland.
- Flax mill established at Old Deer.
- Clyde Model Dockyard is established as a toyshop in Glasgow.

== Births ==
- 5 January – Thomas Pringle, writer, poet and abolitionist (died 1834)
- 28 February – David Duncan, Presbyterian minister (died 1829)
- 1 March – John Ramsay McCulloch, economist (died 1864 in London)
- 17 August – William Knox, poet and journalist (died 1825)
- 12 October – William Collins, publisher (died 1853)
- 30 October – Michael Scott, author (died 1835)
- 9 November – Robert Pearse Gillies, poet and writer (died 1858 in London)
- November – Peter Miller Cunningham, naval surgeon and pioneer in Australia (died 1864 in Greenwich)
- 3 December – Archibald Robertson, physician (died 1864 in Bristol)
- 20 December – William Burn, architect, pioneer of the Scottish Baronial style (died 1870)
- 23 December – George Douglas, 17th Earl of Morton, Tory politician (died 1858)
- Thomas Wright, prison visitor (died 1875 in Manchester)

== Deaths ==
- 17 March – Sir Charles Douglas, 1st Baronet, admiral (born 1727)
- 27 September – Thomas Miller, Lord Glenlee, judge and politician (born 1717)

== Sport ==
- 9 October – the first recorded cricket century to be scored in Scotland is made by the Hon. Colonel Charles Lennox: he scores 136 not out.
