= 1793 in Wales =

- Centuries: 16th; 17th; 18th; 19th; 20th
- Decades: 1770s; 1780s; 1790s; 1800s; 1810s
- See also: List of years in Wales; Timeline of Welsh history 1793 in Great Britain Scotland Elsewhere

This article is about the particular significance of the year 1793 to Wales and its people.

== Incumbents ==
- Lord Lieutenant of Anglesey - Henry Paget
- Lord Lieutenant of Brecknockshire and Monmouthshire – Henry Somerset, 5th Duke of Beaufort
- Lord Lieutenant of Caernarvonshire - Thomas Bulkeley, 7th Viscount Bulkeley
- Lord Lieutenant of Cardiganshire – Wilmot Vaughan, 1st Earl of Lisburne
- Lord Lieutenant of Carmarthenshire – John Vaughan
- Lord Lieutenant of Denbighshire - Richard Myddelton
- Lord Lieutenant of Flintshire - Sir Roger Mostyn, 5th Baronet
- Lord Lieutenant of Glamorgan – John Stuart, Lord Mountstuart (until 14 March) John Stuart, Lord Mount Stuart
- Lord Lieutenant of Merionethshire - Watkin Williams (until 4 December); Sir Watkin Williams-Wynn, 5th Baronet (from 4 December)
- Lord Lieutenant of Montgomeryshire – George Herbert, 2nd Earl of Powis
- Lord Lieutenant of Pembrokeshire – Richard Philipps, 1st Baron Milford
- Lord Lieutenant of Radnorshire – Thomas Harley
- Bishop of Bangor – John Warren
- Bishop of Llandaff – Richard Watson
- Bishop of St Asaph – Lewis Bagot
- Bishop of St Davids – Samuel Horsley (until 7 December)

== Events ==
- 22 November - Two ships, the Morva and the Cavendish, are wrecked on The Smalls off Pembrokeshire.
- Construction of Clydach Ironworks begins.
- A group of Quakers from Nantucket Island settle at Milford Haven, where they attempt to set up a whaling industry.
- Y Cylchgrawn Cymraeg is the first political journal to be published in the Welsh language.

== Arts and literature ==
=== New books ===
- Edward Daniel Clarke - A Tour Through the South of England, Wales, and Part of Ireland, Made During the Summer of 1791

== Births ==
- 17 January - Owen Owen Roberts, physician (d. 1866)
- 8 February - Daniel Rees, clergyman and hymn-writer (d. 1857)
- March - Lewis Lewis (Lewsyn yr Heliwr), political activist (date of death unknown)
- 19 July - John Propert, physician (d. 1867)
- 10 August - John Crichton-Stuart, 2nd Marquess of Bute (d. 1848)
- 11 October - Maria James, poet and domestic servant (d. 1868 in the United States)
- 25 September - Felicia Hemans, poet (d. 1835)

== Deaths ==
- January - Marged ferch Ifan, harpist, 96
- 5 January - Elizabeth Griffith, actress and writer, 73?
- 14 March - Cecil de Cardonnel, 2nd Baroness Dynevor, 57
- 22 May - John Lloyd, antiquary, 60
