= 1786 in Scotland =

- Centuries: 16th; 17th; 18th; 19th; 20th
- Decades: 1760s; 1770s; 1780s; 1790s; 1800s
- See also: List of years in Scotland; Timeline of Scottish history 1786 in: Great Britain • Wales • Elsewhere

Events from the year 1786 in Scotland.

== Incumbents ==
=== Law officers ===
- Lord Advocate – Ilay Campbell
- Solicitor General for Scotland – Robert Dundas of Arniston

=== Judiciary ===
- Lord President of the Court of Session – Lord Arniston, the younger
- Lord Justice General – The Viscount Stormont
- Lord Justice Clerk – Lord Barskimming

== Events ==
- Northern Lighthouse Board formed as the Commissioners of Northern Light Houses by act of parliament largely at the urging of the lawyer and politician "Honest" George Dempster, to oversee the construction and operation of (at this time) four Scottish lighthouses: Kinnaird Head, North Ronaldsay, Scalpay and Mull of Kintyre.
- New Lanark established in South Lanarkshire by David Dale, as a model cotton milling community.
- Millwright Andrew Meikle invents a practical threshing machine.

== Births ==
- 28 February – Christian Ramsay, botanist (died 1839)
- 23 August – John Clunies-Ross, settler of the Cocos (Keeling) Islands (died 1854)
- 18 September – George Beattie, poet (died 1823)

== Deaths ==
- 2 June – Dugald Buchanan, Scottish Gaelic religious poet (born 1716)
- 16 October – Alexander Wilson, surgeon, type founder, astronomer, meteorologist and mathematician (born 1714)
- c. 20 October – Mary Campbell (Highland Mary), dairymaid, beloved of Robert Burns (born 1763)
- 10 November – John Hope, physician and botanist (born 1725)

== The arts ==
- April – 14 May – Robert Burns has an affair with Mary Campbell (Highland Mary).
- 31 July – Robert Burns' Poems, Chiefly in the Scottish Dialect is published by John Wilson in Kilmarnock (the text having been submitted to him on 13 July). The volume proves so popular that Burns abandons his plans to emigrate to Jamaica on 1 September for a post as a bookkeeper on a slave plantation and on 27–28 November journeys on a borrowed pony from Mossgiel Farm for his first visit to Edinburgh. Two weeks later he extemporises his "Address to a Haggis" which is first published on 19 December in the Caledonian Mercury.

== See also ==
- Timeline of Scottish history
- 1786 in Great Britain
