= 1719 in Scotland =

- Centuries: 16th; 17th; 18th; 19th; 20th
- Decades: 1690s; 1700s; 1710s; 1720s; 1730s
- See also: List of years in Scotland; Timeline of Scottish history 1719 in: Great Britain • Wales • Elsewhere

Events from the year 1719 in Scotland.

== Incumbents ==
- Secretary of State for Scotland: The Duke of Roxburghe

=== Law officers ===
- Lord Advocate – Sir David Dalrymple, 1st Baronet
- Solicitor General for Scotland – Robert Dundas

=== Judiciary ===
- Lord President of the Court of Session – Lord North Berwick
- Lord Justice General – Lord Ilay
- Lord Justice Clerk – Lord Grange

== Events ==
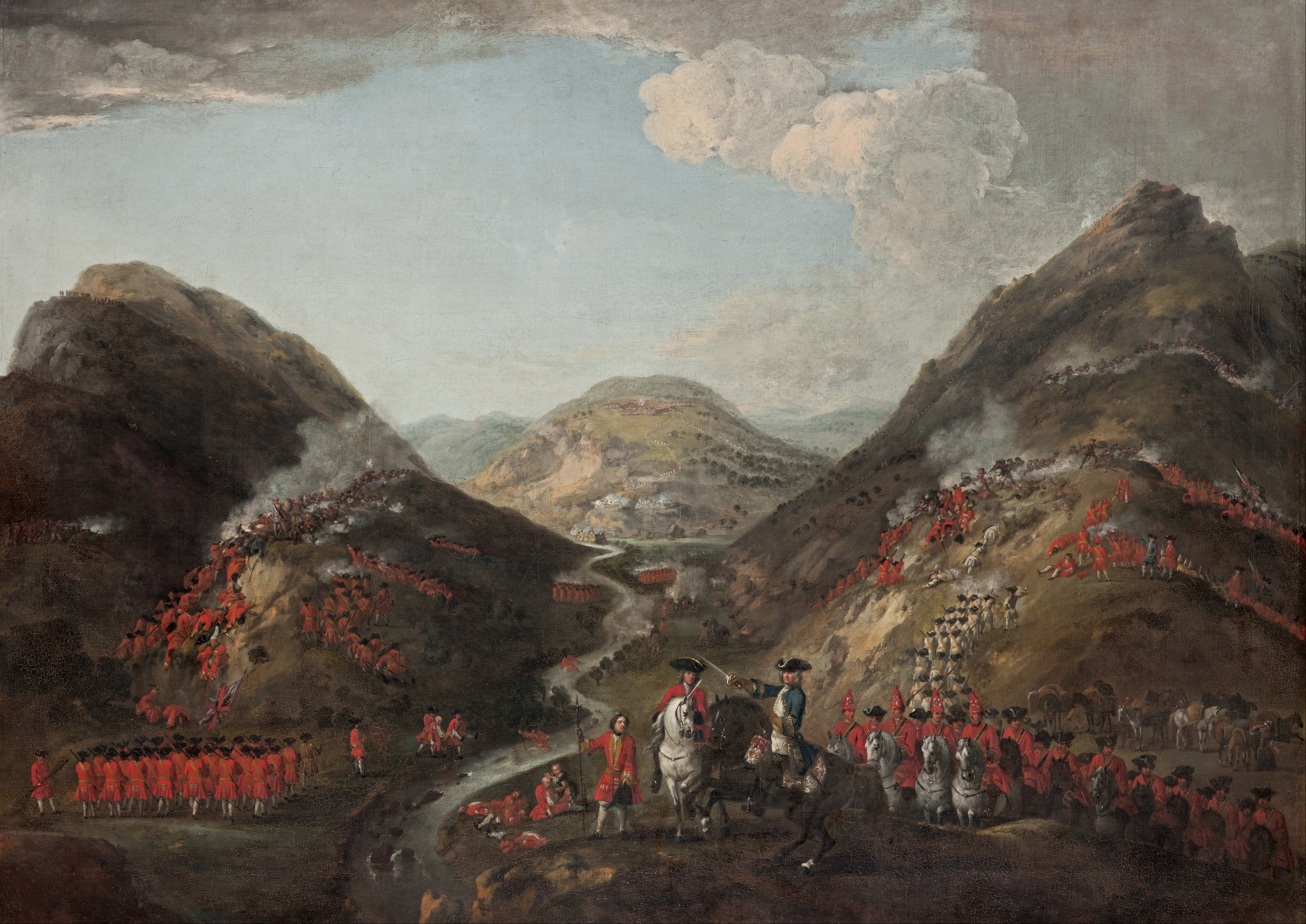
The Battle of Glen Shiel, June 10th 1714

- March – a Jacobite invasion force sets out from Cádiz in Spain but is dispersed by storms and only two ships reach Scotland.
- 10 May – Capture of Eilean Donan Castle: A British naval force capture Eilean Donan from occupying Spanish troops.
- 10 June – Battle of Glen Shiel: British Government troops defeat an alliance of Jacobite and Spanish forces. Spanish forces had supported the Jacobites, under the command of Major General Wightman, in an effort to strain the British Government's resources.
- 1 September – Marriage ceremony of Prince James Francis Edward Stuart ("Old Pretender" to the Scottish throne) and Princess Maria Clementina Sobieska at Montefiascone in Italy.
- Earliest known Newcomen atmospheric engines in Scotland at Stevenston (north Ayrshire) and at Elphinstone, East Lothian (near Tranent).
- Earliest known record of Belhaven Brewery near Dunbar.

== Births ==
- 5 May – Andrew Meikle, mechanical engineer and inventor (died 1811)
- 25 December – George Campbell, Enlightenment philosopher, Presbyterian minister, theologian and professor of divinity (died 1796)
- William Rose, schoolmaster and classical scholar (died 1786)

== Deaths ==
- 29 May – Sir Alexander Seton, 1st Baronet, judge (born c.1639)
- 24 June – James Sutherland, botanist (born c.1638/9)

== The arts ==
- Allan Ramsay publishes Content and a new volume of Scots Songs.

== See also ==
- Timeline of Scottish history
