= 1788 in Wales =

- Centuries: 16th; 17th; 18th; 19th; 20th
- Decades: 1760s; 1770s; 1780s; 1790s; 1800s
- See also: List of years in Wales; Timeline of Welsh history 1788 in Great Britain Scotland Elsewhere

This article is about the particular significance of the year 1788 to Wales and its people.

== Incumbents ==
- Lord Lieutenant of Anglesey - Henry Paget
- Lord Lieutenant of Brecknockshire and Monmouthshire – Henry Somerset, 5th Duke of Beaufort
- Lord Lieutenant of Caernarvonshire - Thomas Bulkeley, 7th Viscount Bulkeley
- Lord Lieutenant of Cardiganshire – Wilmot Vaughan, 1st Earl of Lisburne
- Lord Lieutenant of Carmarthenshire – John Vaughan
- Lord Lieutenant of Denbighshire - Richard Myddelton
- Lord Lieutenant of Flintshire - Sir Roger Mostyn, 5th Baronet
- Lord Lieutenant of Glamorgan – John Stuart, Lord Mountstuart
- Lord Lieutenant of Merionethshire - Sir Watkin Williams-Wynn, 4th Baronet
- Lord Lieutenant of Montgomeryshire – George Herbert, 2nd Earl of Powis
- Lord Lieutenant of Pembrokeshire – Richard Philipps, 1st Baron Milford
- Lord Lieutenant of Radnorshire – Edward Harley, 4th Earl of Oxford and Earl Mortimer
- Bishop of Bangor – John Warren
- Bishop of Llandaff – Richard Watson
- Bishop of St Asaph – Jonathan Shipley (until 6 December)
- Bishop of St Davids – Edward Smallwell (until 15 April); Samuel Horsley (from 11 May)

== Events ==
- 18 March – Great Sessions at Wrexham hear a graveyard dispute between the "Old" and "New" chapels at Llanuwchllyn.
- 4 June – Lloyd Kenyon, 1st Baron Kenyon, becomes Chief Justice of the King's Bench.
- date unknown – Architect John Nash, during his "Welsh interlude", designs the stable block at Plas Llanstephan

== Arts and literature ==
=== New books ===
- Robert Jones (Robert ab Ioan) – Drych i'r Anllythrennog
- Nicholas Owen – British Remains.
- John Roberts (Siôn Robert Lewis) – Yr Athrofa Rad
- Hester Lynch Piozzi – Letters to and from the late Samuel Johnson

== Births ==
- 12 February – William Williams, MP (died 1865)
- 5 October – John Montgomery Traherne, antiquary (died 1860).
- 28 December – Griffith Davies, actuary (died 1855)
- date unknown – Mary Morgan, servant hanged for killing her newborn child (died 1805)
- probable – Elijah Waring, English-born preacher, editor and writer (died 1857)

== Deaths ==
- 30 January – Charles Edward Stuart, last Stuart claimant to the title of Prince of Wales, 67
- 25 May – David Thomas, noted bone-setter, 49
- 4 August – Evan Evans (Ieuan Fardd or Ieuan Brydydd Hir), priest and poet, 57
- 6 December – Jonathan Shipley, Bishop of Llandaff and St Asaph, 74
- date unknown – David Evans, canon of St Asaph, writer and musician, 82–83
