= 1778 in Scotland =

- Centuries: 16th; 17th; 18th; 19th; 20th
- Decades: 1750s; 1760s; 1770s; 1780s; 1790s
- See also: List of years in Scotland; Timeline of Scottish history 1778 in: Great Britain • Wales • Elsewhere

Events from the year 1778 in Scotland.

== Incumbents ==
=== Law officers ===
- Lord Advocate – Henry Dundas;
- Solicitor General for Scotland – Alexander Murray

=== Judiciary ===
- Lord President of the Court of Session – Lord Arniston, the younger
- Lord Justice General – The Duke of Queensberry until 22 October; then from 23 October The Viscount Stormont
- Lord Justice Clerk – Lord Barskimming

== Events ==
- 24 April – American Revolutionary War: North Channel Naval Duel: Scottish-born John Paul Jones in the USS Ranger (1777) captures HMS Drake (1777) in the North Channel off Carrickfergus.
- 15 May – 78th Regiment of Foot raised by Kenneth Mackenzie, 1st Earl of Seaforth, at Elgin. In Summer, there is a brief "Mutiny of MacRaes" at Edinburgh.
- 28 May – Recruiting Act 1778, applying only to London and Scotland, provides for 3-year service in the British Army with a bounty of £3, and for the impressment as soldiers of "all able-bodied idle, and disorderly persons, who could not ... prove themselves to ... follow some lawful trade or employment".
- The Court of Session decides an appeal by slave Joseph Knight which effectively declares that slavery is illegal in Scotland.
- First cotton mill in Scotland established at Penicuik.
- Younger's Brewery established in Edinburgh.
- Inhabited House Tax first imposed.
- Highland Society of London established with "the view of establishing and supporting schools in the Highlands and in the Northern parts of Great Britain, for relieving distressed Highlanders at a distance from their native homes, for preserving the antiquities and rescuing from oblivion the valuable remains of Celtic literature, and for promoting the improvement and general welfare of the Northern parts of Great Britain".

== Births ==
- 9 January – Thomas Brown, metaphysician (died 1820 in London)
- 16 January – John Arbuthnott, 8th Viscount of Arbuthnott, peer and soldier (died 1860 in Bruges?)
- 24 March – Robert Fleming Gourlay, agriculturist in Canada and writer (died 1863)
- 18 April – Mary Bruce, Countess of Elgin, née Nisbet (died 1855)
- 18 May – Andrew Ure, doctor, industrial chemist and encyclopaedist (died 1857 in London)
- 11 August – John Christian Schetky, marine painter (died 1874 in London)
- 1 November – Mary Brunton, novelist (died 1818)
- Robert Davidson, peasant poet (died 1855)
- Approximate date – Anna Maria Walker, née Patton, botanist (died 1852 in India)

== Deaths ==
- 31 October – Thomas Cochrane, 8th Earl of Dundonald, nobleman, army officer and politician (born 1691)
- 15 December – Catherine Read, portrait painter (born 1723)
- Rob Donn, Gaelic poet (born 1714)
- Charles Douglas, 3rd Duke of Queensberry (born 1698)
- George Keith, 10th Earl Marischal, Jacobite and Prussian soldier and diplomat (born 1692/3?; died at Potsdam)

== See also ==
- Timeline of Scottish history
