= 1720 in Scotland =

- Centuries: 16th; 17th; 18th; 19th; 20th
- Decades: 1700s; 1710s; 1720s; 1730s; 1740s
- See also: List of years in Scotland; Timeline of Scottish history 1720 in: Great Britain • Wales • Elsewhere

Events from the year 1720 in Scotland.

== Incumbents ==
- Secretary of State for Scotland: The Duke of Roxburghe

=== Law officers ===
- Lord Advocate – Sir David Dalrymple, 1st Baronet, then Robert Dundas
- Solicitor General for Scotland – Robert Dundas, then Walter Stewart

=== Judiciary ===
- Lord President of the Court of Session – Lord North Berwick
- Lord Justice General – Lord Ilay
- Lord Justice Clerk – Lord Grange

== Events ==
- A great storm cuts Rattray, Aberdeenshire, off from the open sea, creating the Loch of Strathbeg.
- The Caledonian Mercury newspaper begins publication in Edinburgh.
- Food riots in east coast towns from January to March.

== Births ==
- 31 December – Charles Edward Stuart, Jacobite claimant to the British throne (born, and died 1788, in Rome)

== Deaths ==
- 20 April – George Gordon, 1st Earl of Aberdeen, Lord Chancellor of Scotland (born 1637)
- David Gregory, physician and inventor (born 1625)

== See also ==
- Timeline of Scottish history
