= 1724 in Scotland =

- Centuries: 16th; 17th; 18th; 19th; 20th
- Decades: 1700s; 1710s; 1720s; 1730s; 1740s
- See also: List of years in Scotland; Timeline of Scottish history 1724 in: Great Britain • Wales • Elsewhere

Events from the year 1724 in Scotland.

== Incumbents ==
- Secretary of State for Scotland: The Duke of Roxburghe

=== Law officers ===
- Lord Advocate – Robert Dundas
- Solicitor General for Scotland – John Sinclair, jointly with Charles Binning

=== Judiciary ===
- Lord President of the Court of Session – Lord North Berwick
- Lord Justice General – Lord Ilay
- Lord Justice Clerk – Lord Grange

== Events ==
- c. March–November – Galloway "Levellers" dykebreaking in opposition to enclosures.
- 24 December – General George Wade is appointed Commander in Chief in Scotland after his report on the need for military roads in the country.
- Burcefield and Gardie Houses built.

== Births ==
- 20 March – Duncan Ban MacIntyre, Gaelic poet (died 1812)
- 3 June – John Gregory, physician and moralist (died 1773)
- 10 July – James Hamilton, 6th Duke of Hamilton (died 1758 in England)

== Deaths ==
- 14 November – John Murray, 1st Duke of Atholl, soldier and politician (born 1660 in England)

== The arts ==
- Allan Ramsay publishes The Ever Green: Being a collection of Scots Poems and co-writes and edits the first volume of The Tea-Table Miscellany, a collection of Scots songs, in Scots and English.

== See also ==
- Timeline of Scottish history
