= 1784 in Scotland =

- Centuries: 16th; 17th; 18th; 19th; 20th
- Decades: 1760s; 1770s; 1780s; 1790s; 1800s
- See also: List of years in Scotland; Timeline of Scottish history 1784 in: Great Britain • Wales • Elsewhere

Events from the year 1784 in Scotland.

== Incumbents ==
=== Law officers ===
- Lord Advocate – Ilay Campbell
- Solicitor General for Scotland – Robert Dundas of Arniston

=== Judiciary ===
- Lord President of the Court of Session – Lord Arniston, the younger
- Lord Justice General – The Viscount Stormont
- Lord Justice Clerk – Lord Barskimming

== Events ==
- 9 February – Royal Highland and Agricultural Society of Scotland founded as the Highland Society of Edinburgh.
- May
  - The Buchanites are expelled from Irvine, going on to establish a celibate community at New Cample near Closeburn, Dumfriesshire.
  - A dispute arising at the University of Glasgow between Professor John Anderson, the Principal William Leechman and others leads to the self-expulsion of Thomas Muir.
- 25 & 27 August – apothecary James Tytler makes the first balloon ascents in Great Britain, in a hot air balloon from Edinburgh.
- 14 November – Samuel Seabury is consecrated at the house of John Skinner, coadjutor bishop of Aberdeen, as first Bishop of the Episcopal Diocese of Connecticut (his native state), the first bishop of the Episcopal Church in the United States.
- Highland estates whose revenues were forfeited to the government by their proprietors following the Jacobite rising of 1745 are restored to their legal heirs on discharge of debts. The accrued funds are primarily applied to completion of the Forth and Clyde Canal.
- "Wash Act" reduces excise duty on Scotch whisky and provides a definition of the Highland Line.
- St Andrew's Church in New Town, Edinburgh, opened.

== Births ==
- 11 January – Thomas Hamilton, architect (died 1858)
- 20 February – Adam Black, publisher (died 1874)
- 18 May – William Tennant, poet (died 1848)
- 17 July – John Campbell, surgeon (died 1867)
- 27 August – William Cargill, first Superintendent of Otago Province (New Zealand) (died 1860 in New Zealand)
- 25 September – James Bremner, shipbuilder and salvor (died 1856)
- 7 December – Allan Cunningham, poet and artistic biographer (died 1842 in London)

== Deaths ==
- 29 January – George Bogle of Daldowie, tobacco and sugar merchant and Rector of the University of Glasgow (born 1700)
- 13 February – William Burnes, farmer, father of Robert Burns (born 1721)
- 10 August – Allan Ramsay, portrait painter (born 1713; died at Dover)
- 20 May – Alexander Ross, poet (born 1699)

== The arts ==
- 22 May – English actress Sarah Siddons makes her Scottish debut in Edinburgh.
