= 1714 in Scotland =

- Centuries: 16th; 17th; 18th; 19th; 20th
- Decades: 1690s; 1700s; 1710s; 1720s; 1730s
- See also: List of years in Scotland; Timeline of Scottish history 1714 in: Great Britain • Wales • Elsewhere

Events from the year 1714 in Scotland.

== Incumbents ==
- Secretary of State for Scotland: The Earl of Mar to 24 September; then The Duke of Montrose

=== Law officers ===
- Lord Advocate – Thomas Kennedy of Dunure
- Solicitor General for Scotland – Sir James Stewart, Bt jointly with John Carnegie of Boyseck

=== Judiciary ===
- Lord President of the Court of Session – Lord North Berwick
- Lord Justice General – Lord Ilay
- Lord Justice Clerk – Lord Grange

== Events ==
- July – first Catholic seminary in Britain opens at Eilean Bàn on Loch Morar.
- August 1 – George Ludwig, Elector of Hanover, succeeds his distant relative Queen Anne as King George I of Great Britain. This event becomes the catalyst to the Jacobite risings. Jacobite supporters of James Stuart as heir to the throne began to organise after Queen Anne died, ending the blood line of House of Stuart and resulting in the succession of George of Hanover.
- Commissioners of Police for Scotland appointed.
- The first Regius Professor of Law at the University of Glasgow, William Forbes, is appointed.
- Kirkcaldy Brick and Tile Works established on the Links.

== Births ==
- 14 April – Adam Gib, religious leader (died 1788)
- 6 September – Robert Whytt, physician (died 1766)
- 25 October (bapt.) – James Burnett, Lord Monboddo, judge and comparative linguist (died 1799)
- 4 November – John Boyle, 3rd Earl of Glasgow (died 1775)
- Rob Donn, Gaelic poet (died 1778)
- Alexander Garden, politician (died 1785)
- Alexander Wilson, surgeon, type founder, astronomer, meteorologist and mathematician (died 1786)

== Deaths ==
- 1 August – Anne, Queen of Great Britain, last Stuart monarch (born 1665 in England)
- 17 August – George Mackenzie, 1st Earl of Cromartie, Secretary of State for Scotland (born 1630)
- Robert Ferguson, presbyterian minister and political conspirator (born c. 1637)

== See also ==
- Timeline of Scottish history
