= 1780 in Scotland =

- Centuries: 16th; 17th; 18th; 19th; 20th
- Decades: 1760s; 1770s; 1780s; 1790s; 1800s
- See also: List of years in Scotland; Timeline of Scottish history 1780 in: Great Britain • Wales • Elsewhere

Events from the year 1780 in Scotland.

== Incumbents ==
=== Law officers ===
- Lord Advocate – Henry Dundas;
- Solicitor General for Scotland – Alexander Murray

=== Judiciary ===
- Lord President of the Court of Session – Lord Arniston, the younger
- Lord Justice General – The Viscount Stormont
- Lord Justice Clerk – Lord Barskimming

== Events ==
- 31 May – James Watt patents a copying machine.
- 18 December – the Society of Antiquaries of Scotland is formed.
- Dalmally Bridge built.
- Böd of Gremista built in Lerwick.
- Approximate date
  - James Small produces a two-horse swing plough using Carron Company iron.
  - Kilcalmonell Parish Church at Clachan, Kintyre, is rebuilt.

== Births ==
- 15 February – William Laird, shipbuilder (died 1841 in Birkenhead)
- 26 February – Alexander Allan, shipowner (died 1854)
- 17 March – Thomas Chalmers, Free Church leader (died 1847)
- 3 April – Walter Newall, architect and civil engineer (died 1863)
- 30 August – James Howe, animal and portrait painter (died 1836)
- 10 October – John Abercrombie, physician and philosopher (died 1844)
- 16 November – Robert Archibald Smith, composer (died 1829)
- 5 December – Patrick Sellar, lawyer, factor and sheep farmer instrumental in the Highland Clearances (died 1851)
- 26 December – Mary Somerville, née Fairfax, mathematician (died 1872 in Naples)
- David Buchan, naval officer and Arctic explorer (lost at sea 1838)
- Colquhoun Grant, British Army officer (died 1829 in Aachen)
- Robert Pinkerton, Bible missionary (died 1859 in Reigate)
- Andrew Wilson, landscape painter (died 1848)

== Deaths ==
- 7 October – Patrick Ferguson, British Army officer and designer of the Ferguson rifle (born 1744; killed in Battle of Kings Mountain)
- 26 November – Sir James Steuart Denham, economist (born 1712)

== Sport ==
- Royal Aberdeen Golf Club founded as the 'Society of Golfers at Aberdeen'.

== See also ==
- Timeline of Scottish history
