= Jonathan Hughes (poet) =

Welsh poet (1721–1805)

Jonathan Hughes (17 March 1721 – 25 November 1805) was a Welsh poet.

He was born at Pengwern near Llangollen. His work was mainly in the cynghanedd form, and was intended to be sung. He wrote for popular periodicals and is mentioned prominently among the competitors at many 18th century eisteddfodau.

== Works ==
- Y Dywysoges Genefetha (1744)
- Bardd a Byrddau (1778)

His son and namesake (1753–1834) and his grandson, also of the same name (1797–1860), were also poets.

== Sources ==
- Welsh Biography Online
