= 1716 in Scotland =

- Centuries: 16th; 17th; 18th; 19th; 20th
- Decades: 1690s; 1700s; 1710s; 1720s; 1730s
- See also: List of years in Scotland; Timeline of Scottish history 1716 in: Great Britain • Wales • Elsewhere

Events from the year 1716 in Scotland.

== Incumbents ==
- Secretary of State for Scotland: The Duke of Roxburghe

=== Law officers ===
- Lord Advocate – Sir David Dalrymple, 1st Baronet
- Solicitor General for Scotland – Sir James Stewart, Bt jointly with John Carnegie of Boyseck

=== Judiciary ===
- Lord President of the Court of Session – Lord North Berwick
- Lord Justice General – Lord Ilay
- Lord Justice Clerk – Lord Grange

== Events ==
- January
  - Crieff is burned to the ground by Jacobites returning from the Battle of Sheriffmuir.
  - The Duke of Argyll disperses the remainder of the Jacobite troops.
- 5–10 February – The pretender James Francis Edward Stuart flees from Montrose to France. He dismisses Lord Bolingbroke as his secretary of state.
- 24 February – execution of the Jacobite leaders James Radclyffe, 3rd Earl of Derwentwater, and William Gordon, 6th Viscount of Kenmure in London.
- 4 August – George Seton, 5th Earl of Winton, under sentence of death for his part in the Jacobite rising of 1715, escapes from the Tower of London and flees into exile on the continent.
- 1 November – Disarming Act, passed by the Parliament of Great Britain, comes into effect, intended to prevent clansmen in the Highlands from having weapons.
- 13 December – John Ker, 1st Duke of Roxburghe, is appointed Secretary of State for Scotland.
- The Jacobite John Erskine, Earl of Mar, is attainted for treason by the Parliament of Great Britain.
- The post of Professor of Ecclesiastical History in the University of Glasgow is established by King George I of Great Britain.

== Sport ==
- Kilsyth Curling Club established, possibly the world's oldest.

== Births ==
- 2 February – David Graeme, British Army officer (died 1797)
- 4 October – James Lind, pioneer of naval hygiene in the Royal Navy (died 1794)

Date unknown

- Sir James Carnegie, 3rd Baronet, soldier and politician (died 1765)

== Deaths ==
- March – Sir John Maclean, 4th Baronet, clan chief (born 1670)
- 11 May – James Drummond, 4th Earl of Perth, Jacobite (born 1648; died at Château de Saint-Germain-en-Laye)
- 21 May – Robert Fleming the younger, Presbyterian minister (born c. 1660; died in London)
- 24 July – Agnes Campbell, printer (born 1637)
- 15 September – Andrew Fletcher, politician and writer (born 1653; died in London)
- 22 September – Robert Douglas former bishop of Dunblane (born c. 1624)
- 17 October – Anne Hamilton, 3rd Duchess of Hamilton (born 1631 in London)
- 7 December – George Gordon, 1st Duke of Gordon (born 1643)

Date unknown

- Patrick Abercromby, royal physician, antiquary and translator (born 1656)

== See also ==
- Timeline of Scottish history
- 1716 in Great Britain
