= 1717 in Scotland =

- Centuries: 16th; 17th; 18th; 19th; 20th
- Decades: 1690s; 1700s; 1710s; 1720s; 1730s
- See also: List of years in Scotland; Timeline of Scottish history 1717 in: Great Britain • Wales • Elsewhere

Events from the year 1717 in Scotland.

== Incumbents ==
- Secretary of State for Scotland: The Duke of Roxburghe

=== Law officers ===
- Lord Advocate – Sir David Dalrymple, 1st Baronet
- Solicitor General for Scotland – Sir James Stewart, Bt (possibly jointly with Robert Dundas)

=== Judiciary ===
- Lord President of the Court of Session – Lord North Berwick
- Lord Justice General – Lord Ilay
- Lord Justice Clerk – Lord Grange

== Events ==
- 1 January – Count Carl Gyllenborg, the Swedish ambassador to Great Britain, is arrested in London over a plot to assist the Pretender James Francis Edward Stuart.
- February – as part of the Triple Alliance treaty between Britain and France, James Stuart leaves France and seeks refuge with the Pope.
- July – Indemnity Act frees most Jacobites from imprisonment. The Clan Gregor are specifically excluded.
- Horse post introduced between Glasgow, Edinburgh and points north.
- Carrbridge Packhorse Bridge built.
- Drummonds Bank is founded in London by Scottish goldsmith Andrew Drummond.
- Approximate date – the seminary at Scalan begins to train Roman Catholic priests.

== Births ==
- 28 February – Alexander Colville, 7th Lord Colville of Culross, British Royal Navy admiral (died 1770)
- 28 June – Matthew Stewart, mathematician (died 1785)
- 29 June (bapt.) – James Robertson, British Army officer, governor of New York (died 1788 in London)
- July – William Duncan, natural philosopher and classicist (died 1760)
- 10 October – Sir Archibald Edmonstone, 1st Baronet, politician (died 1807 in London)
- 3 November – Thomas Miller, Lord Glenlee, judge and politician (died 1789)

== Deaths ==
- 19 March – John Campbell, 1st Earl of Breadalbane and Holland, royalist (born 1636)
- August – William Cochrane, Member of the Parliament of Great Britain (born after 1659)
- November – John Slezer, military engineer and topographical artist (born before 1650 perhaps in Germany)
- William Boyd, 3rd Earl of Kilmarnock, nobleman

== See also ==
- Timeline of Scottish history
- 1717 in Great Britain
