= 1788 in Scotland =

- Centuries: 16th; 17th; 18th; 19th; 20th
- Decades: 1760s; 1770s; 1780s; 1790s; 1800s
- See also: List of years in Scotland; Timeline of Scottish history 1788 in: Great Britain • Wales • Elsewhere

Events from the year 1788 in Scotland.

== Incumbents ==
=== Law officers ===
- Lord Advocate – Ilay Campbell
- Solicitor General for Scotland – Robert Dundas of Arniston

=== Judiciary ===
- Lord President of the Court of Session – Lord Glenlee
- Lord Justice General – The Viscount Stormont
- Lord Justice Clerk – Lord Braxfield

== Events ==
- 31 January – Henry Benedict Stuart becomes the new Stuart claimant to the throne of Great Britain as King Henry IX and the figurehead of Jacobitism.
- 14 March – the Edinburgh Evening Courant carries a notice of £200 reward for capture of William Brodie, town councillor doubling as a burglar.
- 27 August – trial of William Brodie begins in Edinburgh. He is sentenced to death by hanging.
- 1 October – William Brodie hanged at the Tolbooth in Edinburgh.
- 14 October – William Symington demonstrates a paddle steamer on Dalswinton Loch near Dumfries.
- Tobermory, Mull, and Ullapool are founded as herring ports by the British Fisheries Society to the designs of Thomas Telford.
- Flax mills established at Brigton in Angus and Inverbervie in Kincardineshire.
- Lowland Licence Act restricts exports of Scottish gin to England, effectively requiring a one-year pause in the trade.
- St Gregory's Church, Preshome, designed by Father John Reid, is built.
- Ring of bells cast for the new steeple of St Andrew's Church in New Town, Edinburgh, the oldest complete ring in Scotland.
- General Register House in Edinburgh, designed by Robert Adam and begun in 1774, is opened to the public.
- The estate house at Yair is built.
- Encyclopædia Britannica Third Edition begins publication in Edinburgh.

== Births ==
- 31 January – John Ewart, architect and businessman in North America (died 1856 in Canada)
- April – George Ferguson, naval officer (died 1867 in London)
- 15 May – Neil Arnott, physician (died 1874 in London)
- 29 August – Ranald George Macdonald, clan chief and politician (died 1873 in London)
- 2 September – John Strange, merchant and politician in Canada (died 1840 in Canada)
- 13 October – Thomas Erskine, lawyer and revisionary Calvinist theologian (died 1870)
- 11 November – Thomas Francis Kennedy, lawyer and politician (died 1879)
- 31 December – Basil Hall, naval officer and explorer (died 1844 in Portsmouth)
- David Lennox, builder of stone bridges in Australia (died 1873 in Australia)
- Charles Mackenzie, diplomat and journalist (died 1862 in the United States)
- George Mudie, social reformer
- James Thompson, Baptist pastor and educator in South America (died 1854 in London)

== Deaths ==
- 31 January – Charles Edward Stuart, claimant to the British throne (born 1720, and died, in Italy)
- 14 June – Adam Gib, Secession Church leader (born 1714)
- 15 October – Samuel Greig, admiral in the Imperial Russian Navy (born 1736; died in Tallinn)

== The arts ==
- December – Robert Burns writes his version of the Scots poem Auld Lang Syne. From Whitsun he has been tenant of Ellisland Farm.
- William Collins publishes Ode on the Popular Superstitions of the Highlands of Scotland.

== See also ==
- Timeline of Scottish history
- 1788 in Great Britain
