= 1725 in Scotland =

- Centuries: 16th; 17th; 18th; 19th; 20th
- Decades: 1700s; 1710s; 1720s; 1730s; 1740s
- See also: List of years in Scotland; Timeline of Scottish history 1725 in: Great Britain • Wales • Elsewhere

Events from the year 1725 in Scotland.

== Incumbents ==
- Secretary of State for Scotland: The Duke of Roxburghe, until August; office vacant thereafter

=== Law officers ===
- Lord Advocate – Robert Dundas, then Duncan Forbes
- Solicitor General for Scotland – John Sinclair, jointly with Charles Binning; then John Sinclair, jointly with Charles Erskine

=== Judiciary ===
- Lord President of the Court of Session – Lord North Berwick
- Lord Justice General – Lord Ilay
- Lord Justice Clerk – Lord Grange

== Events ==
- 12 May – the Black Watch is raised as a military company as part of the pacification of the Highlands under General George Wade.
- 22 June – malt riots in Glasgow against higher taxes on Scottish malt used in the production of distilled beverages. Wade's troops enter the city.
- August – John Ker, 1st Duke of Roxburghe, resigns as Secretary of State for Scotland; the post remains vacant until 1742.
- A second Disarming Act is passed as part of the pacification of the Highlands.
- Mining of minerals at Strontian begins.
- One of the earliest examples of a steam pump in Scotland is installed for draining coal mines at Edmonstone in Midlothian.
- Barony of Calton, including Calton Hill, purchased by the city of Edinburgh.
- James Anderson of Stobcross House feues out land near Glasgow for weavers cottages; the area is named Anderson Town in his honour, later becoming Anderston.

== Births ==
- 6 March – Henry Benedict Stuart, cardinal and Jacobite claimant to the British throne (born, and died 1807, in Italy)
- 17 March – Lachlan McIntosh, military and political leader in America (died 1806 in the United States)
- 10 November – John Hope, physician and botanist (died 1786)

== Deaths ==
- 8 October – Sir William Scott of Thirlestane, lawyer and neo-Latin poet (born 1645)
- Alexander Nisbet, heraldist (born 1657)

== The arts ==
- Poet James Thomson moves to London.
- Allan Ramsay publishes The Gentle Shepherd: A Scots pastoral comedy.
- William Thomson compiles Orpheus Caledonius: or a Collection of the Best Scotch Songs.

== See also ==
- Timeline of Scottish history
