= 1722 in Scotland =

- Centuries: 16th; 17th; 18th; 19th; 20th
- Decades: 1700s; 1710s; 1720s; 1730s; 1740s
- See also: List of years in Scotland; Timeline of Scottish history 1722 in: Great Britain • Wales • Elsewhere

Events from the year 1722 in Scotland.

== Incumbents ==
- Secretary of State for Scotland: The Duke of Roxburghe

=== Law officers ===
- Lord Advocate – Robert Dundas
- Solicitor General for Scotland – John Sinclair, jointly with Charles Binning

=== Judiciary ===
- Lord President of the Court of Session – Lord North Berwick
- Lord Justice General – Lord Ilay
- Lord Justice Clerk – Lord Grange

== Events ==
- 7 May – Tranent to Cockenzie Waggonway construction begins.
- Signet Library established in Edinburgh.
- Pheasant introduced to Scotland.
- Possible date – Burning of Janet Horne as a witch – see 1727 in Scotland.

== Births ==
- 26 January – Alexander Carlyle, Church of Scotland leader (died 1805)
- 4 May – Robert McQueen, Lord Braxfield, judge (died 1799)
- 13 September – John Home, Episcopalian minister, playwright and writer (died 1808)
- 16 September – Gabriel Christie, British Army general and settler in Quebec (died 1799 in Canada)
- 1 December – Dunbar Douglas, 4th Earl of Selkirk, Scottish peer (died 1799)
- date unknown
  - John Brown of Haddington, theologian (died 1787)
  - Flora MacDonald, Jacobite (died 1790)
  - Robert Smith, architect working in America (died 1777 in the United States)

== Deaths ==
- 28 February – William Kerr, 2nd Marquess of Lothian, army officer (born 1661)
- 9 August – Robert Sibbald, polymath (born 1641)

== The arts ==
- William Aikman paints a portrait of the poet Allan Ramsay.
- Physician Archibald Pitcairne writes the comedy The Assembly, or Scotch Reformation.

== See also ==
- Timeline of Scottish history
