= 1716 in Great Britain =

Events from the year 1716 in Great Britain.

== Incumbents ==
- Monarch – George I
- Regent – George, Prince of Wales (starting 7 July)

== Events ==
- January – the Duke of Argyll disperses the remainder of the Jacobite troops.
- 16 January – William Wake appointed as Archbishop of Canterbury.
- 10 February – the pretender James Francis Edward Stuart flees to France with the Earl of Mar. He dismisses Lord Bolingbroke as his Secretary of State replacing him with Mar.
- 23 February – William Maxwell of the Jacobite leaders, escapes from the tower of London with the expert help of his wife Winifred Herbert and makes his way to France.
- 24 February – execution of the Jacobite leaders James Radclyffe, 3rd Earl of Derwentwater, and William Gordon, 6th Viscount of Kenmure; their titles and estates suffer attainder.
- 10 March – Joseph Addison's play The Drummer premieres at Drury Lane Theatre. While not as successful at his previous work Cato, it is revived frequently during the following century.
- 11 April – Jacobite leader Thomas Forster escapes from Newgate Prison and goes into exile several days before he is due to stand trial.
- 26 April – Septennial Act 1715 comes into effect, extending the maximum duration of Parliaments from three years to seven (in effect until 2011).
- 4 May – despite increased security measures William Mackintosh leads a mass escape of Jacobites from Newgate Prison. Amongst those to escape and evade recapture is Charles Wogan.
- 14 May – Irish Jacobite Henry Oxburgh is hanged, drawn and quartered at Tyburn for his part in the English rising of the previous year.
- 26 May – two regular companies of field artillery, each 100 men strong, are raised at Woolwich by Royal Warrant.
- 28 May – John Churchill, 1st Duke of Marlborough, suffers a paralytic stroke. He recovers and remains Captain General of the army, but his duties are increasingly taken over by subordinates
- 5 July – Prince Ernest Augustus, younger brother of George I, is created Duke of York and Albany in the peerage of Great Britain.
- 18 July – Melusine von der Schulenburg, mistress of George I, is created for life Duchess of Munster, Marchioness of Dungannon, Countess of Dungannon and Baroness Dundalk, in the Peerage of Ireland.
- 4 August – George Seton, 5th Earl of Winton, under sentence of death for his part in the Jacobite rising of 1715, escapes from the Tower of London and flees into exile on the continent.
- 29 September – the original Portland Bill Lighthouse is first illuminated.
- 9 November – Caroline of Ansbach, Princess of Wales, gives birth to a stillborn son.
- 12 December – Charles Townshend, 2nd Viscount Townshend, is demoted from his office as Secretary of State for the Northern Department in the British government and replaced by James Stanhope, 1st Earl Stanhope a prelude to the Whig Split of the following year.
- 24 December (4 January 1717 New Style) – Britain, France and the Dutch Republic sign the Triple Alliance in an attempt to maintain the Treaty of Utrecht (1713), Britain having signed a preliminary alliance with France on 17 November (28 November New Style).

=== Undated ===
- A fire in Wapping destroys 150 houses.
- Chalybeate mineral springs are discovered in Cheltenham.
- The English pirate Edward Teach is given command of a sloop in the Bahamas.

== Publications ==
- Benjamin Hoadly, Bishop of Bangor's pamphlet A Preservative against the Principles and Practices of Non-Jurors, both in Church and State, initiating the Bangorian Controversy in the Church of England.

== Births ==
- 26 January – George Germain, 1st Viscount Sackville, soldier and politician (died 1785)
- 23 June – Fletcher Norton, 1st Baron Grantley, politician (died 1789)
- 30 August (bapt.) – Lancelot "Capability" Brown, landscape architect (died 1783)
- 6 October – George Montague-Dunk, 2nd Earl of Halifax, statesman (died 1771)
- 26 December – Thomas Gray, poet (died 1771)
- James Brindley, engineer (died 1772)
- c. 1716/17 – John Beard, tenor and actor-manager (died 1791)

== Deaths ==
- 1 January – William Wycherley, playwright (born c. 1641)
- 24 February – executions on Tower Hill
  - James Radclyffe, 3rd Earl of Derwentwater, Jacobite (born 1689)
  - William Gordon, 6th Viscount of Kenmure, Jacobite (born c. 1672)
- 14 April – Arthur Herbert, 1st Earl of Torrington, admiral (born c. 1648)
- 26 April – John Somers, 1st Baron Somers, Lord Chancellor of England (born 1651)
- 5 June – Roger Cotes, mathematician and philosopher (born 1682)
- 28 June – George FitzRoy, 1st Duke of Northumberland, general (born 1665)
- 8 July – Robert South, churchman (born 1634)
- 28 October – Stephen Fox, politician (born 1627)

== See also ==
- 1716 in Wales
