= 1786 in Great Britain =

Events from the year 1786 in Great Britain.

== Incumbents ==
- Monarch – George III
- Prime Minister – William Pitt the Younger (Tory)

== Events ==
- 6 January – the outward bound East Indiaman Halsewell is wrecked on the Isle of Purbeck in a storm with only 74 of more than 240 on board surviving.
- 21 June – first woman to be burnt at the stake at Newgate Prison in London (as distinct from Tyburn or Smithfield), Phoebe Harris for coin counterfeiting. She is led to the stake past the hanged bodies of her accomplices but is allowed to be strangled before the flames are lit.
- 14 July – Convention of London between the Kingdom of Great Britain and the Kingdom of Spain: British settlements on the Mosquito Coast of Central America are to be evacuated; Spain expands the territory available to the British in Belize on the Yucatán Peninsula for cutting mahogany.
- August – British Cabinet approves the establishment of a penal colony at Botany Bay to serve as "a remedy for the evils likely to result from the late alarming and numerous increase of felons in this country and more particularly in the metropolis" (London).
- 1 August – Caroline Herschel discovers a comet, the first discovered by a woman, from Datchet.
- 2 August – a delusional needlewoman, Margaret Nicholson, attempts to stab the king outside St James's Palace in London; she will be confined for the remaining 42 years of her life in Bethlehem Hospital for the insane.
- 11 August – Captain Francis Light acquires the island of Penang from the Sultan of Kedah on behalf of the British East India Company, renaming it Prince of Wales Island in honour of the heir to the British throne, the first colony of the British Empire in Southeast Asia.
- 1 September to 30 November – at 7.50 °C or 45.50 °F, this is the equal coolest autumn in the CET series with that of 1676, and the coolest since monthly data are accurate to a tenth of a degree.
- 26 September – commercial treaty with France (the Eden Agreement) signed.

=== Unknown date ===
- Sinking fund of £1M per annum established to reduce the national debt.
- Last convocation of the Devon Stannary Parliament.
- New Lanark established in South Lanarkshire, Scotland, by David Dale, as a model cotton milling community.
- Scottish millwright Andrew Meikle invents a practical threshing machine.
- Wall's begins in business as a butchery.
- Wills, Watkins & Co. open a tobacconists’ shop in Bristol which will become W.D. & H.O. Wills.

== Publications ==
- William Beckford's gothic novel Vathek.
- Robert Burns' Poems, Chiefly in the Scottish Dialect and "Address to a Haggis".

== Births ==
- 1 January – Dixon Denham, explorer (died 1828)
- 26 January – Benjamin Haydon, painter and writer (suicide 1846)
- 1 April – Fowell Buxton, brewer, politician, abolitionist and social reformer (died 1845)
- 17 April – William King, physician and philanthropist (died 1865)
- 9 May – James Foster, ironmaster (died 1853)
- 9 June – William George Horner, mathematician (died 1837)
- 5 July – Charles Alfred Stothard, draughtsman (died 1821)
- 24 September – Granville Waldegrave, naval officer (died 1857)
- 26 September – Gordon Bremer, rear admiral (died 1850)
- 2 November – Anne Knight, social reformer (died 1862)
- 29 November – Fairfax Moresby, Calcutta-born admiral of the fleet (died 1877)
- 11 December – William John Bankes, MP, explorer and Egyptologist (died 1855 in exile)
- Unknown date
  - John Shuttleworth, industrialist and political campaigner (died 1864)

== Deaths ==
- 19 January – John Duncombe, writer (born 1729)
- 25 February – Thomas Wright, astronomer, mathematician, instrument maker, architect, garden designer, antiquary and genealogist (born 1711)
- 10 April – John Byron, Vice Admiral (born 1723)
- 21 June – George Hepplewhite, furniture maker (born 1727)
- July – Josiah Martin, colonial governor (born 1737)
- 18 October – Alexander Wilson, mathematician (born 1714)
- 31 October – Princess Amelia of Great Britain (b. 1711)

== See also ==
- 1786 in Wales
