= 1798 in Wales =

- Centuries: 16th; 17th; 18th; 19th; 20th
- Decades: 1770s; 1780s; 1790s; 1800s; 1810s
- See also: List of years in Wales; Timeline of Welsh history 1798 in Great Britain Scotland Elsewhere

This article is about the particular significance of the year 1798 to Wales and its people.

== Incumbents ==
- Lord Lieutenant of Anglesey – Henry Paget
- Lord Lieutenant of Brecknockshire and Monmouthshire – Henry Somerset, 5th Duke of Beaufort
- Lord Lieutenant of Caernarvonshire – Thomas Bulkeley, 7th Viscount Bulkeley
- Lord Lieutenant of Cardiganshire – Wilmot Vaughan, 1st Earl of Lisburne
- Lord Lieutenant of Carmarthenshire – John Vaughan
- Lord Lieutenant of Denbighshire – Sir Watkin Williams-Wynn, 5th Baronet
- Lord Lieutenant of Flintshire – Lloyd Kenyon, 1st Baron Kenyon
- Lord Lieutenant of Glamorgan – John Stuart, 1st Marquess of Bute
- Lord Lieutenant of Merionethshire - Sir Watkin Williams-Wynn, 5th Baronet
- Lord Lieutenant of Montgomeryshire – George Herbert, 2nd Earl of Powis
- Lord Lieutenant of Pembrokeshire – Richard Philipps, 1st Baron Milford
- Lord Lieutenant of Radnorshire – Thomas Harley
- Bishop of Bangor – John Warren
- Bishop of Llandaff – Richard Watson
- Bishop of St Asaph – Lewis Bagot
- Bishop of St Davids – William Stuart

== Events ==
- March - Historian William Richards returns from Wales to King's Lynn.
- 31 March - George Herbert, 2nd Earl of Powis, becomes Lord Lieutenant of Shropshire;
- June/August - Clogwyn Du'r Arddu is climbed by Peter Bailey Williams and William Bingley, botanists looking for alpine plants on Snowdon.
- 13 July - William Wordsworth, visiting Wales, writes "Lines composed a few miles above Tintern Abbey on revisiting the banks of the Wye during a tour".
- 17 October - First recorded use of the word "tramroad", in the minutes of the Brecon and Abergavenny Canal Company.
- unknown dates
  - The Gwyneddigion Society launches its project of publishing ancient Welsh manuscripts.
  - William Lort Mansel becomes Master of Trinity College, Cambridge.
  - William Madocks buys the Tan-yr-Allt estate on Traeth Mawr.
  - Morgan John Rhys buys a tract of land in the Allegheny mountains of North America for the purpose of founding a Welsh colony, which he names Cambria.

== Arts and literature ==
=== New books ===
- Emily Clark - Ianthé, or the Flower of Caernarvon
- Thomas Roberts of Llwyn'rhudol - Cwyn yn erbyn Gorthrymder
- Hester Thrale - Three Warnings to John Bull before he dies. By an Old Acquaintance of the Public
- Richard Warner - Second Walk Through Wales

=== Music ===
- Edward Jones (Bardd y Brenin) - Popular Cheshire Melodies

== Births ==
- 3 August - Llewelyn Lewellin, first principal of St David's College, Lampeter (died 1878)
- 16 August - Alfred Ollivant, Bishop of Llandaff (died 1882)
- date unknown - John Jones Archdeacon of Bangor (died 1863)

== Deaths ==
- 21 June - Edward Evan, poet, 81
- 6 July - Joshua Evans, Quaker minister of Welsh descent, 66
- 17 November - George Cadogan Morgan, dissenting minister and scientist, 44
- 23 November - David Samwell (Dafydd Ddu Feddyg), naval surgeon and poet, 47
- 16 December - Thomas Pennant, naturalist and travel writer, 72
