= 1712 in Great Britain =

Events from the year 1712 in Great Britain.

== Incumbents ==
- Monarch – Anne

== Events ==
- 1 January – War of the Spanish Succession: Peace congress opens at Utrecht.
- 2 January – In the British House of Lords, twelve new Tory peers known as Harley's Dozen take their seats.
- 17 January – Robert Walpole imprisoned in the Tower of London following charges of corruption.
- 3 March – Scottish Episcopalians Act 1711 comes into effect, leading to incorporation of the Scottish Episcopal Church.
- 15 March – HMS Dragon, a 38-gun fourth rate frigate of the Royal Navy, is wrecked on Les Casquets rocks to the west of Alderney.
- 30 March – Queen Anne administers the Royal touch, a ritual with the intent to cure illness, for the last time; 300 scrofulous people are touched, the last of whom is Samuel Johnson.
- 18 April – Louisa Maria Stuart, considered by Jacobites to be Princess Royal and heir to the throne of her brother James, dies of smallpox in French exile. Her brother also falls ill but recovers.
- May – British Army in Flanders under the Duke of Ormonde receives "restraining orders" that prevents them taking part in any offensive against France due to ongoing peace talks.
- 8 July – The Royal Navy 50-gun ship HMS Advice is launched at Deptford Dockyard.
- 24 July – War of the Spanish Succession: At the Battle of Denain, the French defeat a combined Dutch-Austrian force following the withdrawal of British troops.
- 1 August – The Stamp Act 1712 is passed, imposing a tax on publishers, particularly of newspapers.
- 23 August – The Royal Navy 60-gun ship HMS Rippon is launched at Deptford Dockyard.
- September – Composer George Frideric Handel re-locates to London.
- 3 October – In Scotland a warrant is issued for the arrest of outlaw Rob Roy MacGregor by Sir James Stewart (Lord Advocate).
- 4 November – Bandbox Plot: Jonathan Swift foils an attempted murder of Robert Harley, 1st Earl of Oxford and Earl Mortimer.
- 12 November – Hamilton–Mohun duel takes place in London. The Duke of Hamilton and Lord Mohun fight a duel in Hyde Park in which both are killed.
- 22 November – The first performance of George Frideric Handel's opera Il pastor fido takes place at the Queen's Theatre in the Haymarket, London.

=== Undated ===
- The first known working Newcomen steam engine is built by Thomas Newcomen with John Calley to pump water out of mines in the Black Country, the first practical device to harness the power of steam to produce mechanical work.
- John Arbuthnot creates the character of "John Bull" to represent Britain.
- Castle Howard in North Yorkshire, designed by Sir John Vanbrugh, is completed.
- Royal Hospital School established for seafarers' orphans by charter at the site of Greenwich Hospital, London.
- Building begins of St. Paul's, Deptford, a church designed by Thomas Archer.

== Publications ==
=== Poetry and Songs ===
- Sir Richard Blackmore, Creation: a philosophical poem
- John Dennis, Essay on the Genius and Writings of Shakspear: with Some Letters of Criticism to the Spectator
- Thomas Ellwood, Davideis: The Life of King David of Israel

=== Drama ===
- The Successful Pyrate by Charles Johnson.

== Births ==
- 17 January – John Stanley, composer (died 1786)
- 19 February – Arthur Devis, portrait painter (died 1787)
- 8 March – John Fothergill, physician (died 1780)
- 22 March – Edward Moore, writer (died 1757)
- 14 October – George Grenville, Prime Minister of Great Britain (died 1770)
- 21 October – Sir James Denham Steuart, 4th Baronet, economist (died 1780)
- Richard Glover, poet (died 1785)
- Sarah Clayton, industrialist (died 1779)

== Deaths ==
- 2 February – Martin Lister, naturalist and physician (born 1639)
- 25 March – Nehemiah Grew, naturalist (born 1641)
- 1 July – William King, poet (born 1663)
- 12 July – Richard Cromwell, Lord Protector of England, Scotland, and Ireland (born 1626)
- 26 July – Thomas Osborne, 1st Duke of Leeds, statesman (born 1631)
- 3 August – Joshua Barnes, scholar (born 1654)
- 18 August – Richard Savage, 4th Earl Rivers, soldier (born c. 1660)
- 29 August – Gregory King, statistician (born 1648)
- 15 November – Hamilton–Mohun duel
  - James Hamilton, 4th Duke of Hamilton, courtier and politician (born 1658 in Scotland)
  - Charles Mohun, 4th Baron Mohun of Okehampton, politician and rake (born c. 1675)

== See also ==
- 1712 in Wales
