= 1718 in Scotland =

- Centuries: 16th; 17th; 18th; 19th; 20th
- Decades: 1690s; 1700s; 1710s; 1720s; 1730s
- See also: List of years in Scotland; Timeline of Scottish history 1718 in: Great Britain • Wales • Elsewhere

Events from the year 1718 in Scotland.

== Incumbents ==
- Secretary of State for Scotland: The Duke of Roxburghe

=== Law officers ===
- Lord Advocate – Sir David Dalrymple, 1st Baronet
- Solicitor General for Scotland – Robert Dundas

=== Judiciary ===
- Lord President of the Court of Session – Lord North Berwick
- Lord Justice General – Lord Ilay
- Lord Justice Clerk – Lord Grange

== Events ==
- Damask linen industry established at Dunfermline by James Blake and at Drumsheugh.
- Marrow Controversy, an ecclesiastical dispute.
- Old Calton Burial Ground established on Calton Hill, Edinburgh, by the Society of the Incorporated Trades of Calton.
- Edinburgh Evening Courant newspaper launched.
- First passage to America of a ship built on the Clyde, and belonging to Glasgow.
- Regius Chair of Anatomy and Botany at the University of Glasgow established.

== Births ==
- 18 February – Robert Henry, historian (died 1790)
- 7 April – Hugh Blair, Presbyterian preacher and man of letters (died 1800)
- 29 April – Robert Sandeman, theologian (died 1771 in Danbury, Connecticut)
- 23 May – William Hunter, anatomist and obstetrician (died 1783 in London)

== Deaths ==
- 1 May – Sir Gilbert Elliot, 1st Baronet, of Minto, judge, politician and writer (born c. 1650)

== See also ==
- Timeline of Scottish history
