= David Duncan (minister) =

British minister

David Duncan (28 February 1789 – 27 August 1829) was a British minister in the Presbyterian United Secession Church.

== Life ==
Born in Forgandenny, Perthshire, Scotland, fourth son of Lilias and Gilbert Duncan. He was educated at the University of Edinburgh, studied Latin, Greek, logic, mathematics, moral and natural philosophy. In 1817 he was admitted a student into the Divinity Hall, under the inspection of the General Associate Synod of the Presbyterian Secession Church: the Rev. George Paxton, of Edinburgh, was professor. In 1822, he took the ministerial care of the United Associate Congregation of Union Chapel in Sunderland, Durham until he died after suffering from an infection.

David Duncan was interred in a vault immediately below the pulpit of Union Chapel, Coronation Street, Sunderland.
