= 1726 in Scotland =

- Centuries: 16th; 17th; 18th; 19th; 20th
- Decades: 1700s; 1710s; 1720s; 1730s; 1740s
- See also: List of years in Scotland; Timeline of Scottish history 1726 in: Great Britain • Wales • Elsewhere

Events from the year 1726 in Scotland.

== Incumbents ==
- Secretary of State for Scotland: vacant

=== Law officers ===
- Lord Advocate – Duncan Forbes
- Solicitor General for Scotland – John Sinclair, jointly with Charles Erskine

=== Judiciary ===
- Lord President of the Court of Session – Lord North Berwick
- Lord Justice General – Lord Ilay
- Lord Justice Clerk – Lord Grange

== Events ==
- c. April/May – General George Wade begins an 11-year construction program on military roads of Scotland.
- 25 May – Britain's first circulating library is opened in Edinburgh by poet and bookseller Allan Ramsay.
- 23 June – professional Irish swordsman Andrew Bryan is defeated in a public duel in Edinburgh by 62-year-old Killiecrankie veteran Donald Bane "to the great joy of the Edinburgh citizenry".
- A faculty of medicine is formally established at the University of Edinburgh, a predecessor of the University of Edinburgh Medical School. John Rutherford becomes Professor of Practice of Medicine.

== Births ==
- 17 January – Hugh Mercer, soldier and physician (died 1777 of wounds received at the Battle of Princeton)
- 6 February – Patrick Russell, surgeon and herpetologist (died 1805 in London)
- 3 June – James Hutton, geologist (died 1797)
- 26 September – John H. D. Anderson, scientist (died 1796)
- Andrew Bell, engraver, co-founder of the Encyclopædia Britannica (died 1809)
- Thomas Melvill, natural philosopher (died 1753)

== Deaths ==
- 8 July – John Ker, spy (born 1673)
- August – Colonel John Stewart (of Livingstone), former Member of Parliament for the Kirkcudbright Stewartry, killed by Sir Gilbert Eliott, 3rd Baronet, of Stobs
- 25 November – Robert Dundas, Lord Arniston, judge

== The arts ==
- James Thomson begins publication of his poem cycle The Seasons with "Winter".

== See also ==
- 1726 in Great Britain
