= 1723 in Scotland =

- Centuries: 16th; 17th; 18th; 19th; 20th
- Decades: 1700s; 1710s; 1720s; 1730s; 1740s
- See also: List of years in Scotland; Timeline of Scottish history 1723 in: Great Britain • Wales • Elsewhere

Events from the year 1723 in Scotland.

== Incumbents ==
- Secretary of State for Scotland: The Duke of Roxburghe

=== Law officers ===
- Lord Advocate – Robert Dundas
- Solicitor General for Scotland – John Sinclair, jointly with Charles Binning

=== Judiciary ===
- Lord President of the Court of Session – Lord North Berwick
- Lord Justice General – Lord Ilay
- Lord Justice Clerk – Lord Grange

== Events ==
- 8 June – The Honourable Society of Improvers in the Knowledge of Agriculture in Scotland is formed in Edinburgh by over 300 landowners, part of the Scottish Enlightenment.
- 11 November – 18 people drown in the River Tweed near Melrose when a ferry boat capsizes.

== Births ==
- 3 February – Catherine Read, portrait painter (died 1778 at sea)
- c. 5 February (16 February NS) – John Witherspoon, Presbyterian minister, a Founding Father of the U.S. and President of the College of New Jersey (modern-day Princeton University; died 1794 in the United States)
- 23 February – William Chambers, architect (born in Gothenburg; died 1796 in London)
- 5 June (baptized; 16 June NS) – Adam Smith, economist and philosopher (died 1790)
- 20 June (1 July NS) – Adam Ferguson, philosopher and social historian (died 1816)
- 29 August – William Dalrymple, Church of Scotland minister (died 1814)
- Lady Anne Farquharson-MacKintosh, Jacobite (died 1784)
- Gavin Hamilton, neoclassical history painter, archaeologist and dealer (died 1798 in Rome)
- Francis Peacock, "father of Scottish country dance" (died 1807)

== Deaths ==
- 3 April – George Watson, accountant and benefactor (born 1654)

== The arts ==
- Mavisbank House in Midlothian is designed by William Adam in collaboration with his client, Sir John Clerk of Penicuik, and construction begins; it is the first Palladian villa in Scotland.
- Cairney-born painter William Aikman settles in London as a portraitist under the patronage of John Campbell, Duke of Argyll.

== See also ==
- Timeline of Scottish history
