= 1715 in Scotland =

- Centuries: 16th; 17th; 18th; 19th; 20th
- Decades: 1690s; 1700s; 1710s; 1720s; 1730s
- See also: List of years in Scotland; Timeline of Scottish history 1715 in: Great Britain • Wales • Elsewhere

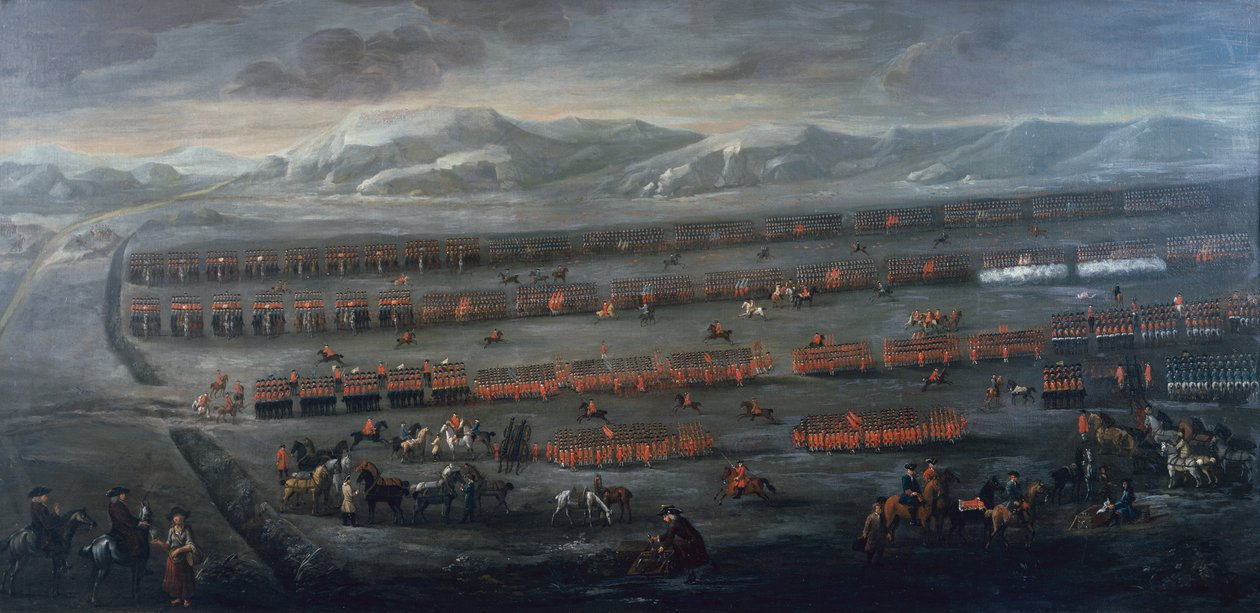
13 November: Battle of Sheriffmuir

Events from the year 1715 in Scotland.

== Incumbents ==
- Secretary of State for Scotland: The Duke of Montrose, until August; then The Duke of Roxburghe

=== Law officers ===
- Lord Advocate – Sir David Dalrymple, 1st Baronet
- Solicitor General for Scotland – Sir James Stewart, Bt jointly with John Carnegie of Boyseck

=== Judiciary ===
- Lord President of the Court of Session – Lord North Berwick
- Lord Justice General – Lord Ilay
- Lord Justice Clerk – Lord Grange

== Events ==
- 28 August – under the pretext of a stag hunting party (tichel), John Erskine, Earl of Mar, clandestinely returns from exile in France, summons leading Jacobite chiefs and gentlemen to gather at Braemar.
- September – former Prince of Wales and Duke of Rothesay James Francis Edward Stuart and his supporters launch the First Jacobite uprising in an effort to reclaim the throne of Great Britain for the House of Stuart.
- 6 September – first of the major Jacobite risings in Scotland against the rule of King George I of Great Britain: The Earl of Mar raises the standard of James Edward Stuart at Braemar and marches on Edinburgh.
- 13 November – Battle of Sheriffmuir is fought between Jacobites under the Earl of Mar and the Duke of Argyll's army. Although the action is inconclusive, Argyll halts the Jacobite advance. According to legend, Ormacleit Castle on South Uist burns down on the death in this battle of its owner Allan Macdonald, chief of Clanranald.
- 14 November – Battle of Preston: Government forces defeat a Jacobite incursion at the conclusion of a five-day siege and action, the last battle fought on English soil.
- 15 November – The Glasgow Courant, the first newspaper published in the city, appears.
- 22 December – James Edward Stuart joins Jacobite rebels at Peterhead but fails to rouse his army.
- Horse post introduced between Edinburgh and Glasgow.
- Birkhall built.

== Births ==
- 4 February – John Hamilton, Member of Parliament for Wigtown Burghs and Wigtownshire (died 1796)

Date unknown

- Thomas Braidwood, pioneer in deaf education (died 1806 in London)

== Deaths ==
- 28 December – William Carstares, Church of Scotland clergyman (born 1649)

== The arts ==
- Colen Campbell begins publication of his pattern book Vitruvius Britannicus, or the British Architect.
- Walter Scott's novel Rob Roy (1817) climaxes around the time of the Jacobite rising of 1715.

== See also ==
- Timeline of Scottish history
