= 1790 in Scotland =

- Centuries: 16th; 17th; 18th; 19th; 20th
- Decades: 1770s; 1780s; 1790s; 1800s; 1810s
- See also: List of years in Scotland; Timeline of Scottish history 1790 in: Great Britain • Wales • Elsewhere

Events from the year 1790 in Scotland.

== Incumbents ==
=== Law officers ===
- Lord Advocate – Robert Dundas of Arniston
- Solicitor General for Scotland – Robert Blair

=== Judiciary ===
- Lord President of the Court of Session – Lord Succoth
- Lord Justice General – The Viscount Stormont
- Lord Justice Clerk – Lord Braxfield

== Events ==
- 16 June–28 July – British general election gives Pitt an increased majority.
- 28 June – Forth and Clyde Canal opened.
- October – Pladda Lighthouse first illuminated.
- Balblair distillery at Edderton founded.
- Caerlee Mill at Innerleithen completed, the oldest woollen mill in the Scottish Borders.
- New Ardkinglas Castle built.
- Construction of Gosford House to the design of Robert Adam for Francis Wemyss-Charteris is begun.
- The mineral element strontium is discovered near Strontian by chemists Adair Crawford and William Cruickshank.
- Approximate date – Whaligoe steps cut.

== Births ==
- 3 March – Robert Story, Church of Scotland minister and writer (died 1859)
- 25 October – Robert Stirling, Church of Scotland minister and inventor of the Stirling engine (died 1878)
- 29 October – David Napier, marine engineer (died 1869 in London)
- James Clow, Presbyterian minister and settler in Melbourne (died 1861 in Australia)
- Approximate date – Mary Diana Dods, writer as "David Lyndsay", later known as "Walter Sholto Douglas" (died 1830 in France)

== Deaths ==
- 5 February – William Cullen, physician and chemist (born 1710)
- 4 March – Flora MacDonald, Jacobite (born 1722)
- 17 July – Adam Smith, economist and philosopher (born 1723)
- 24 November – Robert Henry, historian and Church of Scotland minister (born 1718)

== The arts ==
- Catholic priest Alexander Geddes writes the poem Linton: a Tweedside Pastoral, Carmen Seculare pro Gallica Gente in praise of the French Revolution.
- Kirkmichael musician Robert Petrie publishes several Highland music pieces with "Mrs. Small of Dirnanean" in their title. The compositions are published in "Petrie's Collection of Strathspey Reels & County Dances".
