= Thomas Williams (priest and translator) =

British priest (1658–1726)

Thomas Williams (1658–1726) was a Welsh Anglican priest and translator.

== Life ==
Williams was born in Eglwysbach in the county of Denbighshire, north Wales in 1658. He studied at the University of Oxford, matriculating as a member of Jesus College in 1674 before obtaining his BA in 1677 and his MA in 1680. After his ordination as a priest in the Church of England, he appears to have succeeded his father, William Williams, as rector of a church near Abergele, north Wales. A "Thomas Williams", possibly this one, served as rector of Llanarmon Dyffryn Ceiriog from 1687 to 1702. From 1690 to 1697, Williams was vicar of Llanrwst, and he was then appointed rector of Denbigh, a position that he held until he died in 1726.

Aside from his parish duties, Williams worked to translate various religious works from English into Welsh, including a book on the catechism by the Bishop of St Asaph, William Beveridge (Eglurhad o Gatecism yr Eglwys (1708)).
