= John Walters (priest and lexicographer) =

John Walters (1721–1797) was a Welsh cleric from Glamorgan in the eighteenth century. He wrote a couple of manifestos, including A Dissertation on the Welsh Language (1770), in which he praised the Welsh language. He was a noted lexicographer, publishing An English–Welsh Dictionary in fifteen parts (1770 to 1794).

Walters was born on 22 August 1721. His father, also named John, was a timber merchant, but both his parents died when John jr was in his youth. It is likely that it was John Walters who convinced printer Rhys Thomas (d. 1790) to establish Glamorgan's first printing press at Cowbridge. It was this press which printed Walter's English/Welsh Dictionary, the first part issued on 5 April 1770.

John Walters died on 1 June 1797, and was buried at Llandough. His eldest son was the poet and priest John Walters.
