= 1791 in Wales =

- Centuries: 16th; 17th; 18th; 19th; 20th
- Decades: 1770s; 1780s; 1790s; 1800s; 1810s
- See also: List of years in Wales; Timeline of Welsh history 1791 in Great Britain Scotland Elsewhere

This article is about the particular significance of the year 1791 to Wales and its people.

== Incumbents ==
- Lord Lieutenant of Anglesey - Henry Paget
- Lord Lieutenant of Brecknockshire and Monmouthshire – Henry Somerset, 5th Duke of Beaufort
- Lord Lieutenant of Caernarvonshire - Thomas Bulkeley, 7th Viscount Bulkeley
- Lord Lieutenant of Cardiganshire – Wilmot Vaughan, 1st Earl of Lisburne
- Lord Lieutenant of Carmarthenshire – John Vaughan
- Lord Lieutenant of Denbighshire - Richard Myddelton
- Lord Lieutenant of Flintshire - Sir Roger Mostyn, 5th Baronet
- Lord Lieutenant of Glamorgan – John Stuart, Lord Mountstuart
- Lord Lieutenant of Merionethshire - Watkin Williams
- Lord Lieutenant of Montgomeryshire – George Herbert, 2nd Earl of Powis
- Lord Lieutenant of Pembrokeshire – Richard Philipps, 1st Baron Milford
- Lord Lieutenant of Radnorshire – Thomas Harley (politician, born 1730) (from 8 April)
- Bishop of Bangor – John Warren
- Bishop of Llandaff – Richard Watson
- Bishop of St Asaph – Lewis Bagot
- Bishop of St Davids – Samuel Horsley

== Events ==
- June - William Jones distributes copies of an address at the Llanrwst eisteddfod, titled To all Indigenous Cambro-Britons, calling on poor Welsh farmers to set up a colony in the United States.
- Richard Phillips builds Clyne Castle.
- Peter Williams is excommunicated by the Methodists for publishing Sabellian heresy.
- Probable date of completion of Methodist chapel at Earlswood, Monmouthshire.
- Thomas Jones becomes High Sheriff of Radnorshire.

== Arts and literature ==
=== New books ===
- Joshua Thomas - New translation of the Baptist "Confession of Faith" issued by the London Assembly of 1689
- John Williams - An enquiry into the truth of the tradition concerning the discovery of America by Prince Madog ab Owen Gwynedd, about the year 1170
- Peter Williams - Llythyr at Hen Gydymaith

== Births ==
- 23 February - Sir John Cowell-Stepney, baronet, landowner and politician (d. 1877)
- 5 December - William Henry Yelverton, MP for Carmarthen Boroughs 1832–1835 (d. 1884)
- date unknown
  - Robert Everett, Independent minister and writer (d. 1875)
  - Thomas Fothergill, ironmaster (d. 1858)

== Deaths ==
- 11 January - William Williams (Pantycelyn), poet and hymn-writer, 73
- 13 February - William Parry, artist, 48
- 19 April - Richard Price, philosopher, 68
- 17 September - David Morris (hymn writer), 47
