= 1721 in Scotland =

- Centuries: 16th; 17th; 18th; 19th; 20th
- Decades: 1700s; 1710s; 1720s; 1730s; 1740s
- See also: List of years in Scotland; Timeline of Scottish history 1721 in: Great Britain • Wales • Elsewhere

Events from the year 1721 in Scotland.

== Incumbents ==
- Secretary of State for Scotland: John Ker, 1st Duke of Roxburghe

=== Law officers ===
- Lord Advocate – Robert Dundas
- Solicitor General for Scotland – Walter Stewart; then John Sinclair and Charles Binning

=== Judiciary ===
- Lord President of the Court of Session – Lord North Berwick
- Lord Justice General – Lord Ilay (also this year appointed Keeper of the Privy Seal of Scotland)
- Lord Justice Clerk – Lord Grange

== Events ==
- Battle of Glen Affric: Men of the Jacobite Clan Mackenzie and Clan Macrae ambush men of the pro-Hanoverian Clan Ross led by William Ross, 6th of Easter Fearn (who is fatally wounded) when he attempts to collect rents (forfeit to the crown) on the Mackenzie estates.
- Battle of Coille Bhan: British Army troops of Colonel Kirk's Regiment under Captain McNeill drive off an attack from the Clan Mackenzie but again fail to collect rents on their estates.
- Ruthven Barracks completed.
- Chandos Chair of Medicine and Anatomy established at the University of St Andrews.
- Robert Wodrow publishes The History of the Sufferings of the Church of Scotland.

== Births ==
- 21 January – James Murray, military officer and colonial administrator (died 1794)
- 5 March – John Adam, architect (died 1792)
- 19 March (baptized) – Tobias Smollett, novelist (died 1771 in Tuscany)
- 24 June – Francis Garden, Lord Gardenstone, judge (died 1793)
- 14 July – John Douglas, Anglican bishop of Salisbury and man of letters (died 1807 in England)
- 19 September – William Robertson, historian and Principal of the University of Edinburgh (died 1793)
- 3 October – John Skinner, Episcopalian minister, historian, poet and songwriter (died 1807)
- 5 October – William Wilkie, Presbyterian minister, natural philosopher and poet (died 1772)
- 6 December – James Elphinston, philologist (died 1809 in England)
- Earliest likely date – James Grainger, physician, poet and translator (died 1766 in the West Indies)

== Deaths ==
- 14 January – William Johnstone, 1st Marquess of Annandale (born 1664)
- 13 December – Alexander Selkirk, sailor and castaway (born 1676; died at sea)

== See also ==
- Timeline of Scottish history
