= 1795 in Wales =

- Centuries: 16th; 17th; 18th; 19th; 20th
- Decades: 1770s; 1780s; 1790s; 1800s; 1810s
- See also: List of years in Wales; Timeline of Welsh history 1795 in Great Britain Scotland Elsewhere

This article is about the particular significance of the year 1795 to Wales and its people.

== Incumbents ==
- Lord Lieutenant of Anglesey - Henry Paget
- Lord Lieutenant of Brecknockshire and Monmouthshire – Henry Somerset, 5th Duke of Beaufort
- Lord Lieutenant of Caernarvonshire - Thomas Bulkeley, 7th Viscount Bulkeley
- Lord Lieutenant of Cardiganshire – Wilmot Vaughan, 1st Earl of Lisburne
- Lord Lieutenant of Carmarthenshire – John Vaughan
- Lord Lieutenant of Denbighshire – Richard Myddelton (until 2 April)
- Lord Lieutenant of Flintshire - Sir Roger Mostyn, 5th Baronet
- Lord Lieutenant of Glamorgan – John Stuart, 1st Marquess of Bute
- Lord Lieutenant of Merionethshire - Sir Watkin Williams-Wynn, 5th Baronet
- Lord Lieutenant of Montgomeryshire – George Herbert, 2nd Earl of Powis
- Lord Lieutenant of Pembrokeshire – Richard Philipps, 1st Baron Milford
- Lord Lieutenant of Radnorshire – Thomas Harley
- Bishop of Bangor – John Warren
- Bishop of Llandaff – Richard Watson
- Bishop of St Asaph – Lewis Bagot
- Bishop of St Davids – William Stuart

== Events ==
- 8 April - George, Prince of Wales, marries his first cousin, Princess Caroline of Brunswick.
- June - Cecilia Thrale, youngest daughter of Hester Thrale, elopes with John Meredith Mostyn, a member of the prominent Anglesey family.
- July - Ezekiel Hughes, Edward Bebb and others leave Llanbryn-mair on foot, bound for Philadelphia.
- September - Hester Thrale and her second husband, Gabriele Piozzi, settle in Wales, where they begin renovating Bachygraig.
- date unknown
  - Samuel Homfray brings an unsuccessful suit, at Hereford Assizes, of the commoners against the Dowlais Company.
  - The events of the French Revolution cause corn prices to rise dramatically, but wages do not follow. Food riots are commonplace across Wales for the several years after.
  - The Universal British Directory includes the first-ever entry for Merthyr Tydfil.
  - Copper bolts forged at Parys Mountain are used in the construction of an American warship, the USS Constitution.

== Arts and literature ==
=== New books ===
- Thomas Evans (Tomos Glyn Cothi) - The Miscellaneous Repository neu Y Drysorfa Gymysgedig
- John Jones (Jac Glan-y-gors) - Seren Tan Gwmmwl

== Births ==
- 18 January - Edward Lloyd-Mostyn, 2nd Baron Mostyn, politician (died 1884)
- 5 August - George Rice-Trevor, 4th Baron Dynevor, politician (died 1869)
- December - John Davies, philosopher (died 1861)
- 7 December - Samuel George Homfray, industrialist (died 1882)
- 11 December - Thomas Taylor Griffith, surgeon (died 1876)
- date unknown - Zephaniah Williams, Chartist (died 1874)
- probable - Maria Jane Williams, musician (d. 1873)

== Deaths ==
- 25 January - Morgan Edwards, Baptist historian, 72
- 2 April – Richard Myddelton, Lord Lieutenant of Denbighshire, 69
- 11 March - William Mostyn Owen, landowner and politician, 72/3
- May - David Ellis, clergyman and poet, 58
- 20 August - William Jones, poet, antiquary and radical, 71
- 14 October - Henry Owen, theologian, 79
