= John Wynne (bishop) =

Welsh bishop

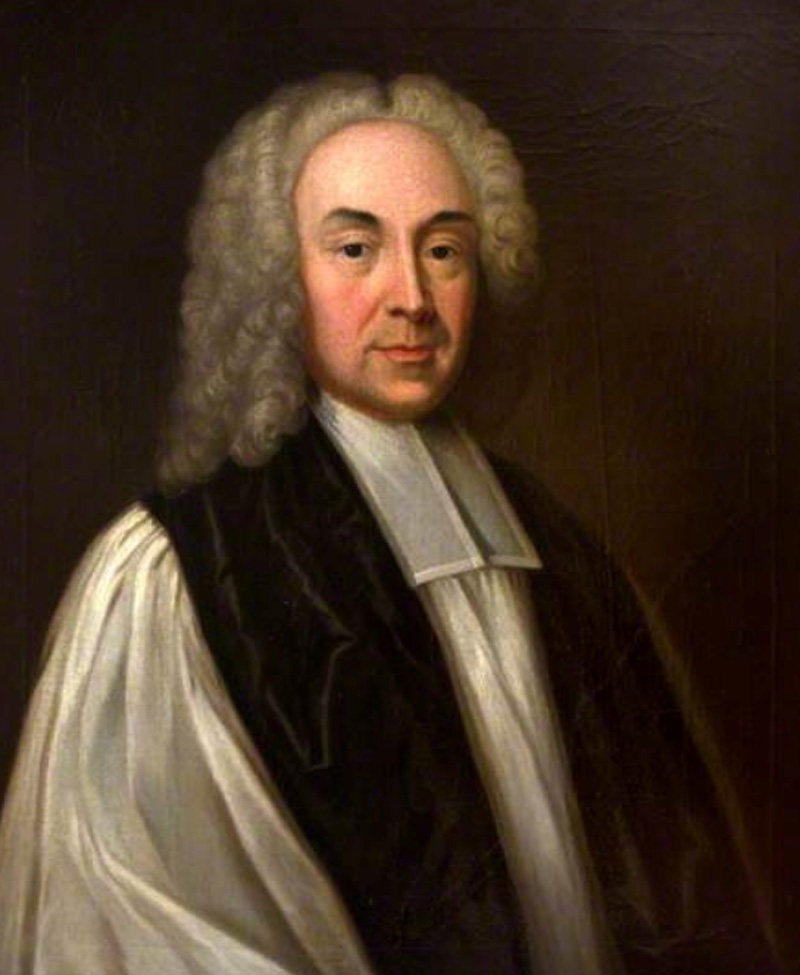
John Wynne

John Wynne (born between 1665 and 1667 – 15 July 1743) was Bishop of St Asaph (1715–1727) and of Bath and Wells (1727–1743), having previously been principal of Jesus College, Oxford (1712–1720).

== Life ==
Wynne was born in Maes-y-coed, Caerwys, Flintshire, in north Wales and educated in Northop and at Ruthin School before entering Jesus College, Oxford in March 1682. He obtained his BA degree in 1685 and was elected a Fellow of the college in January 1687. Subsequently, he was awarded the degrees of MA (1688), BD (1696) and DD (1706). He was chaplain to the 8th Earl of Pembroke, who appointed him rector of Llangelynnin, Merionethshire in 1701 (a post he held until 1714). In 1705, he became prebendary of Christ College, Brecon. He was Lady Margaret Professor of Divinity at Oxford 1705–1716. In 1712, he became deputy-principal of Jesus College, being appointed principal in August 1712 after some division between Whig and Tory Fellows (Wynne probably being a moderate Tory at this time), with the help of the college's Visitor, his former employer the Earl of Pembroke. He held onto the post until 1720, despite much grumbling at Oxford after he had been appointed Bishop of St Asaph in 1715 (the first bishop to be created by King George I). He became Bishop of Bath and Wells in 1727, as a compromise candidate, and remained there until his death in 1743.

Whilst at St Asaph, he raised £600 for repairs to the cathedral. He was one of the few Welshmen to be appointed as bishop of a Welsh diocese during the eighteenth century (and was the last Welsh bishop of St Asaph before 1870) and gained a reputation as a diligent bishop and one who appointed local men to parishes. He published only three of his sermons and, in 1696, an abridgment of John Locke's An Essay Concerning Human Understanding, with Locke's approval, which was translated into French and Italian.

In 1732, in light of a debt, Edward Conway sold the Soughton Hall estate in Flintshire to Wynne. He planted extensively in the wider house grounds, including three well-preserved Lime tree avenues including the almost-complete one which still flanks the approach to the house. After his death it passed to his daughter Margaret, wife of Henry Bankes MP of Corfe Castle, Dorset.

Church of England titles
Preceded by William Fleetwood	Bishop of St Asaph; 1714–1727	Succeeded by Francis Hare
Preceded by George Hooper	Bishop of Bath and Wells; 1727–1743	Succeeded by Edward Willes
