= Lord Lieutenant of Flintshire =

Welsh county ceremonial officer

This is a list of people who have served as Lord Lieutenant of Flintshire. Since 1802, all Lord Lieutenants have also been Custos Rotulorum of Flintshire. The office was abolished on 31 March 1974, and was replaced by the Lord Lieutenant of Clwyd.

== Lord Lieutenants of Flintshire to 1974 ==
See Lord Lieutenant of Wales before 1694

- Charles Talbot, 1st Duke of Shrewsbury 31 May 1694 – 10 March 1696
- Charles Gerard, 2nd Earl of Macclesfield 10 March 1696 – 5 November 1701
- William Stanley, 9th Earl of Derby 18 June 1702 – 5 November 1702
- Hugh Cholmondeley, 1st Earl of Cholmondeley 2 December 1702 – 4 September 1713
- Other Windsor, 2nd Earl of Plymouth 4 September 1713 – 21 October 1714
- Hugh Cholmondeley, 1st Earl of Cholmondeley 21 October 1714 – 18 January 1725
- George Cholmondeley, 2nd Earl of Cholmondeley 7 April 1725 – 7 May 1733
- George Cholmondeley, 3rd Earl of Cholmondeley 14 June 1733 – 25 October 1760
- Sir Roger Mostyn, 5th Baronet 10 July 1761 – 26 July 1796
- Lloyd Kenyon, 1st Baron Kenyon 9 September 1796 – 1 June 1798
- Robert Grosvenor, 1st Marquess of Westminster 1 June 1798 – 17 February 1845
- Sir Stephen Glynne, 9th Baronet 25 April 1845 – 17 June 1874
- Hugh Robert Hughes 4 August 1874 – 29 April 1911
- William Glynne Charles Gladstone 6 July 1911 – 15 April 1915
- Henry Neville Gladstone, 1st Baron Gladstone of Hawarden 23 June 1915 – 28 April 1935
- Rear-Admiral Rafe Grenville Rowley-Conwy, 3 June 1935 – 4 April 1951
- Brigadier Hugh Salusbury Kynaston Mainwaring, 6 July 1951 – 31 March 1974 †

† Became Lord Lieutenant of Clwyd 1 April 1974.

== Deputy lieutenants ==
A deputy lieutenant of Flintshire is commissioned by the Lord Lieutenant of Flintshire. Deputy lieutenants support the work of the lord-lieutenant. There can be several deputy lieutenants at any time, depending on the population of the county. Their appointment does not terminate with the changing of the lord-lieutenant, but they usually retire at age 75.

=== 19th Century ===
- 20 March 1846: Richard Price Puleston
