= 1741 in Scotland =

- Centuries: 16th; 17th; 18th; 19th; 20th
- Decades: 1720s; 1730s; 1740s; 1750s; 1760s
- See also: List of years in Scotland; Timeline of Scottish history 1741 in: Great Britain • Wales • Elsewhere

Events from the year 1741 in Scotland.

== Incumbents ==
- Secretary of State for Scotland: vacant

=== Law officers ===
- Lord Advocate – Charles Erskine
- Solicitor General for Scotland – William Grant of Prestongrange

=== Judiciary ===
- Lord President of the Court of Session – Lord Culloden
- Lord Justice General – Lord Ilay
- Lord Justice Clerk – Lord Milton

== Events ==
- 17 May – George Watson's College opens in Edinburgh as George Watson's Hospital.
- Royal Infirmary of Edinburgh moves to a new building designed by William Adam.
- Robert Foulis sets up a publishing business in Glasgow.
- Leadhills Miners' Library set up.
- Earliest known record of the Royal Order of Scotland within British Freemasonry.
- 47th (Lancashire) Regiment of Foot raised in Scotland as General John Mordaunt's Regiment of Foot.

== Births ==
- 2 March – James Stuart, British Army officer, commander-in-chief of the Madras Army (died 1815 in England)
- 23 August – James Hope-Johnstone, 3rd Earl of Hopetoun (died 1816)
- 25 August – Henry Hunter, Presbyterian minister and translator (died 1802 in England)
- James Moncrief, military engineer (died of wounds 1793 in Flanders)
- William Russell, writer (died 1793)

== Deaths ==
- 18 March – Thomas Gordon, commodore in the Royal Scots Navy and admiral in the Imperial Russian Navy (born c. 1658; died in Russia)
- November – John Ker, academic and Latin poet

== See also ==
- Timeline of Scottish history
