= 1752 in Scotland =

- Centuries: 16th; 17th; 18th; 19th; 20th
- Decades: 1730s; 1740s; 1750s; 1760s; 1770s
- See also: List of years in Scotland; Timeline of Scottish history 1752 in: Great Britain • Wales • Elsewhere

Events from the year 1752 in Scotland.

== Incumbents ==
=== Law officers ===
- Lord Advocate – William Grant of Prestongrange
- Solicitor General for Scotland – Patrick Haldane of Gleneagles, jointly with Alexander Hume

=== Judiciary ===
- Lord President of the Court of Session – Lord Arniston the Elder
- Lord Justice General – Lord Ilay
- Lord Justice Clerk – Lord Tinwald

== Events ==
- 17 March – the Parliament of Great Britain passes an act to bestow estates forfeited by Jacobites to the Crown and to use the revenue to develop the Scottish Highlands.
- 14 May – Appin Murder: Colin Roy Campbell of Glenure ("The Red Fox"), 44, who has recently been dispossessing members of the Jacobite Clan Stewart of Appin, is shot in the back in the wood of Lettermore between Ballachulish and Kentallen. The chief suspect, Alan Breck Stewart, having fled to France, James Stewart of the Glen is found guilty "in art and part" (as an accessory to the crime) at Inveraray by a judge and jury entirely from Clan Campbell and hanged on 8 November at Cnap a' Chaolais above the narrows at Ballachulish.
- 3–13 September – these dates are omitted from the calendar in Britain as part of the adoption of the Gregorian calendar to correct the discrepancy between Old Style and New Style dates.
- Bonawe ironworks established.
- Pollok House near Glasgow, designed by William Adam is built.
- Kinbuck Bridge is built.
- The village of Luncarty is established by William Sandeman to house his employees.
- Adam Smith transfers to professor of moral philosophy at the University of Glasgow.

== Births ==
- 13 January – Sir Philip Anstruther-Paterson, 3rd Baronet, politician (died 1808)
- 6 April – Hugh Elliot, colonial governor (died 1830 in London)
- 17 April – John Austin, inventor (died 1830)
- 6 November – George Skene Keith, minister and writer on diverse topics (died 1823)
- 20 November – George Cumming, politician (died 1834)
- Andrew Wodrow, Virginia merchant (died 1814 in the United States)

== Deaths ==
- 23 February – John Campbell, 2nd Earl of Breadalbane and Holland (born 1662)
- 6 November – Ralph Erskine, preacher (born 1685)

== The arts ==
- Robert Louis Stevenson's 1886 novel Kidnapped is inspired by the Appin Murder case.

== See also ==
- Timeline of Scottish history
