= 1742 in Scotland =

- Centuries: 16th; 17th; 18th; 19th; 20th
- Decades: 1720s; 1730s; 1740s; 1750s; 1760s
- See also: List of years in Scotland; Timeline of Scottish history 1742 in: Great Britain • Wales • Elsewhere

Events from the year 1742 in Scotland.

== Incumbents ==
- Secretary of State for Scotland: vacant until 16 February; then The Marquess of Tweeddale

=== Law officers ===
- Lord Advocate – Charles Erskine, then Robert Craigie
- Solicitor General for Scotland – William Grant of Prestongrange; then Robert Dundas, the younger

=== Judiciary ===
- Lord President of the Court of Session – Lord Culloden
- Lord Justice General – Lord Ilay
- Lord Justice Clerk – Lord Milton

== Events ==
- February–November – Cambuslang Work, an outbreak of Christian revival at Cambuslang.
- 16 February – the post of Secretary of State for Scotland, vacant since 1725, is revived in favour of John Hay, 4th Marquess of Tweeddale; he holds it until 1746.
- Delftware manufactured in Glasgow.
- Kirkcaldy Beer Duties Act passed.

== Births ==
- 13 March (or 1743)? – Anne Hunter, née Home, lyricist (probably born in Ireland; died 1821 in London)
- 28 April – Henry Dundas, statesman (died 1811)
- 29 July – Isabella Graham, née Marshall, teacher and philanthropist (died 1814 in the United States)
- 26 December (bapt.) – George Chalmers, antiquarian (died 1825 in London)
- John Kay, caricaturist and engraver (died 1826)

== Deaths ==
- 2 April – James Douglas, royal physician, anatomist and obstetrician (born 1675; died in London)

== See also ==
- Timeline of Scottish history
