= 1739 in Scotland =

- Centuries: 16th; 17th; 18th; 19th; 20th
- Decades: 1710s; 1720s; 1730s; 1740s; 1750s
- See also: List of years in Scotland; Timeline of Scottish history 1739 in: Great Britain • Wales • Elsewhere

Events from the year 1739 in Scotland.

== Incumbents ==
- Secretary of State for Scotland: vacant

=== Law officers ===
- Lord Advocate – Charles Erskine
- Solicitor General for Scotland – William Grant of Prestongrange

=== Judiciary ===
- Lord President of the Court of Session – Lord Culloden
- Lord Justice General – Lord Ilay
- Lord Justice Clerk – Lord Milton

== Events ==
- January (dated 9 February) – the original version of The Scots Magazine begins publication in Edinburgh.
- Suspended ministers of the "Associate Presbytery" (First Secession) led by Ebenezer Erskine are summoned to appear before the General Assembly of the Church of Scotland, but fail to attend because they do not acknowledge its authority.
- The six Independent Highland Companies known as the Black Watch are augmented to ten and formed into the 43rd Highland Regiment of Foot (the "Earl of Crawford's Highlanders"), a regular British Army regiment of the line. Its first colonel is John Lindsay, 20th Earl of Crawford (who on 22 July has been wounded at the Battle of Grocka).
- The potato is first cultivated in Scotland as a field crop, at Kilsyth.

== Births ==
- 4 February – John Robison, physicist, inventor, natural philosopher and conspiracy theorist (died 1805)
- 21 August – Archibald Campbell, British Army officer, colonial governor, landowner and politician (died 1791 in London)
- 31 October – James Craig, architect (died 1795)
- James Anderson of Hermiston, agriculturalist (died 1808)
- Alexander Gordon, Lord Rockville, judge (died 1792)
- Udney Hay, American revolutionary and politician (died 1806 in the United States)

== Deaths ==
- November – William Cockburn, physician (born 1669; died in London)

== See also ==
- Timeline of Scottish history
