= 1740 in Scotland =

- Centuries: 16th; 17th; 18th; 19th; 20th
- Decades: 1720s; 1730s; 1740s; 1750s; 1760s
- See also: List of years in Scotland; Timeline of Scottish history 1740 in: Great Britain • Wales • Elsewhere

Events from the year 1740 in Scotland.

== Incumbents ==
- Secretary of State for Scotland: vacant

=== Law officers ===
- Lord Advocate – Charles Erskine
- Solicitor General for Scotland – William Grant of Prestongrange

=== Judiciary ===
- Lord President of the Court of Session – Lord Culloden
- Lord Justice General – Lord Ilay
- Lord Justice Clerk – Lord Milton

== Events ==
- 7 July – Adam Smith sets out from Scotland to take up a scholarship at Balliol College, Oxford.
- Hugh and Robert Tennent take over the Wellpark Brewery, originally known as the Drygate Brewery, in Glasgow.
- General George Wade is succeeded as Commander-in-chief in Scotland by Sir John Cope.
- The 43rd Highland Regiment of Foot (the 'Black Watch') first musters, at Aberfeldy.

== Births ==
- 28 March (bapt.) – James Small, inventor (died 1793)
- 15 July – Archibald Hamilton, 9th Duke of Hamilton (died 1819)
- 29 October – James Boswell, diarist and biographer of Samuel Johnson (died 1795)
- James Cannon, mathematician and a principal draftsman of the Pennsylvania Constitution of 1776 (died in 1782 in the United States)
- William Davidson, settler, lumberman, shipbuilder and politician in New Brunswick (died 1790 in Canada)
- William Smellie, master printer, naturalist, antiquary, editor and encyclopedist (died 1795)
- Christopher Wyvill, cleric, landowner and political reformer in England (died 1822)

== Deaths ==
- 2 February – John Simson, heterodox theologian (born 1668?)
- 22 May – John Boyle, 2nd Earl of Glasgow (born 1688)
- 8 September – William Bruce, 8th Earl of Kincardine

== The arts ==
- 1 August – the patriotic song "Rule, Britannia!", with words by Scottish-born poet James Thomson, is first performed at Cliveden, the English country home of Frederick, Prince of Wales.

== See also ==
- Timeline of Scottish history
