= 1749 in Scotland =

- Centuries: 16th; 17th; 18th; 19th; 20th
- Decades: 1720s; 1730s; 1740s; 1750s; 1760s
- See also: List of years in Scotland; Timeline of Scottish history 1749 in: Great Britain • Wales • Elsewhere

Events from the year 1749 in Scotland.

== Incumbents ==
=== Law officers ===
- Lord Advocate – William Grant of Prestongrange
- Solicitor General for Scotland – Patrick Haldane of Gleneagles, jointly with Alexander Hume

=== Judges ===
- Lord President of the Court of Session – Lord Arniston the Elder
- Lord Justice General – Lord Ilay
- Lord Justice Clerk – Lord Tinwald

== Events ==
- 5 January – James Wolfe is promoted to major in Peyton's Regiment of Foot, at this time stationed in Glasgow.
- 6 March – A "corpse riot" breaks out in Glasgow after a body disappears from a churchyard in the Gorbals district. It is suspected that anatomy students at the Glasgow Infirmary "had raised a dead body from the grave and carried it to the college" for dissection. The city guard intervenes after a mob of protesters begin breaking windows at random buildings, and groups of citizens begin to make regular patrols of church graveyards.
- 4 June – A fire in Glasgow leaves 200 families homeless.
- A stagecoach service opens between Edinburgh and Glasgow.
- The Treason Outlawries (Scotland) Act is passed.

== Births ==
- 1 June – James Cunningham, 14th Earl of Glencairn, nobleman, soldier and patron (died 1791 in England)
- 18 June – John Brown, miniature painter (died 1787)
- 29 August – Gilbert Blane, naval physician (died 1834 in England)
- 6 September – Benjamin Bell, surgeon (died 1806)
- October – Archibald Skirving, portrait painter (died 1819)
- 3 November – Daniel Rutherford, physician, chemist and botanist noted for the isolation of nitrogen (died 1819)
- 7 November – Charles Smith, portrait painter (died 1824)
- 8 December – Hugo Arnot, né Pollock, lawyer and campaigner (died 1786)
- 15 December – James Graeme, poet (died 1772)
- John Cunningham, 15th Earl of Glencairn, nobleman, cavalry officer and priest (died 1796)
- Ralph Walker, civil engineer (died 1824 in England)

== Deaths ==
- 18 April – Alexander Robertson of Struan, chief of Clan Donnachaidh, Jacobite leader and poet (born c. 1668/70)
- 19 October – William Ged, goldsmith and inventor of stereotyping (born 1699)
- 19 December – George Seton, 5th Earl of Winton, exiled Jacobite (born c. 1678; died in Italy)
- 25 December – John Lindsay, 20th Earl of Crawford, 1st colonel of the Black Watch (born 1702)
- John Munro, 4th of Newmore, soldier and politician

== See also ==
- Timeline of Scottish history
