= 1751 in Scotland =

- Centuries: 16th; 17th; 18th; 19th; 20th
- Decades: 1730s; 1740s; 1750s; 1760s; 1770s
- See also: List of years in Scotland; Timeline of Scottish history 1751 in: Great Britain • Wales • Elsewhere

Events from the year 1751 in Scotland.

== Incumbents ==
=== Law officers ===
- Lord Advocate – William Grant of Prestongrange
- Solicitor General for Scotland – Patrick Haldane of Gleneagles, jointly with Alexander Hume

=== Judiciary ===
- Lord President of the Court of Session – Lord Arniston the Elder
- Lord Justice General – Lord Ilay
- Lord Justice Clerk – Lord Tinwald

== Events ==
- 24 April – John Wesley arrives at Musselburgh, his destination on his first mission to Scotland.
- 21 June – Alexander Geddes from Kinnermony, Banffshire, is executed at Aberdeen for bestiality, becoming the last felon in Scotland to be burnt following execution.
- 1 July – The Cameronians, at this time serving in Ireland, are formally ranked as the 26th Regiment of Foot.
- David Hume settles in Edinburgh and publishes An Enquiry Concerning the Principles of Morals.
- In the University of Glasgow:
  - Adam Smith is appointed professor of logic.
  - The Medical School is founded.
- John Smith & Son bookshop in Glasgow established, claiming to be the oldest surviving bookseller in the English-speaking world.
- Culter paper mill established.
- First turnpike act for Scotland, for improvement of the road from Edinburgh to South Queensferry.
- Approximate date – bridge built at Bridge of Orchy.

== Births ==
- 23 April – Gilbert Elliot-Murray-Kynynmound, colonial administrator (died 1814 in England)
- 3 or 29 June – William Roxburgh, surgeon and botanist, "father of Indian botany" (died 1815)
- 2 August – William Adam of Blair Adam, judge and politician (died 1839)
- 8 August – William Leslie, British Army officer (killed 1777 at Battle of Princeton)
- 10 December – James Donaldson, printer, newspaper publisher and philanthropist (died 1830)
- Donald Campbell, traveler in India and the Middle East (died 1804 in England)
- Approximate date – Helen Craik, novelist and poet (died 1825 in England)

== Deaths ==
- 16 February – Charles Maitland, politician (born c. 1704)
- 18 February – Patrick Campbell, politician (born 1684)
- 24 May – William Hamilton, comic poet (born c. 1665)
- 22 August (2 September NS) – Andrew Gordon, Benedictine and inventor (born 1712; died in Saxony)
- September – David Fordyce, philosopher (born 1711; lost at sea)

== The arts ==
- Alasdair mac Mhaighstir Alasdair publishes his anti-Hanoverian volume of poems Ais-Eiridh na Sean Chánoin Albannaich ("The Resurrection of the Ancient Scottish Language") in Edinburgh, including his satire on the aisling form An Airce ("The Ark").
- Tobias Smollett's novel The Adventures of Peregrine Pickle is published.
- Robert Louis Stevenson's book "Kidnapped" is based in 1751.

== See also ==
- Timeline of Scottish history
