= 1745 in Scotland =

- Centuries: 16th; 17th; 18th; 19th; 20th
- Decades: 1720s; 1730s; 1740s; 1750s; 1760s
- See also: List of years in Scotland; Timeline of Scottish history 1745 in: Great Britain • Wales • Elsewhere

Events from the year 1745 in Scotland.

== Incumbents ==
- Secretary of State for Scotland: The Marquess of Tweeddale

=== Law officers ===
- Lord Advocate – Robert Craigie
- Solicitor General for Scotland – Robert Dundas, the younger

=== Judiciary ===
- Lord President of the Court of Session – Lord Culloden
- Lord Justice General – Lord Ilay
- Lord Justice Clerk – Lord Milton

== Events ==
- 11 May – War of the Austrian Succession: Battle of Fontenoy in the Low Countries: Although this is a decisive French victory, the 43rd Highland Regiment of Foot (the 'Black Watch') distinguishes itself in its first battle.
- 23 July – Jacobite rising: The Young Pretender Charles Edward Stuart lands on Eriskay in the Hebrides from the Du Teillay.
- 16 August – Jacobite rising: A Jacobite victory at Highbridge Skirmish.
- 19 August – Jacobite rising: Charles Stuart raises his standard at Glenfinnan.
- September – Jacobite rising: Duncan Forbes, Lord Culloden, is commissioned to raise 18 new Independent Highland Companies from clans loyal to the government.
- 11 September – Jacobite rising: Jacobites enter Edinburgh.
- 16 September – Jacobite rising: "Canter of Coltbrigg": The 13th and 14th Dragoons flee Jacobites near Edinburgh.
- 17 September – Jacobite rising: In Edinburgh, Charles Stuart proclaims his father James Francis Edward Stuart as James VIII of Scotland.
- 21 September – Jacobite rising: Government forces are defeated at the Battle of Prestonpans.
- Autumn – Meikleour Beech Hedges planted.
- 13–15 November – Jacobite rising: Jacobites besiege and capture Carlisle, across the English border.
- December – Jacobite rising: Jacobite garrison in Carlisle surrenders to Hanoverian forces under Prince William, Duke of Cumberland.
- 4 December – Jacobite rising: Jacobite forces reach as far south in England as Derby causing panic in London.
- 6 December – Jacobite rising: Jacobite forces decide to retreat to Scotland.
- 18 December – Jacobite rising: A Jacobite victory at the Clifton Moor Skirmish, the last action between two military forces on English soil.
- 23 December – Jacobite rising: A Jacobite victory at the Battle of Inverurie.
- Prospectus issued for "The Company for Improving the Linen Manufactury in Scotland", which becomes the British Linen Bank.

== Births ==
- 12 May – William Creech, bookseller and Lord Provost of Edinburgh (died 1815)
- 24 May – Thomas Potter, industrialist, founder of Denmark's first iron foundry (died 1811 in Copenhagen)
- 23 June – James Graham, quack doctor (died 1794)
- 2 July – Robert Calder, admiral (died 1818 in Hampshire)
- 26 July – Henry Mackenzie, novelist, writer, poet and lawyer (died 1831)
- William Cruikshank, anatomist and chemist (died 1800 in London)
- Anne Forbes, Scottish portrait painter (died 1834)
- Approximate date – Sydney Parkinson, botanical illustrator (died 1771 at sea)

== Deaths ==
- Spring – William Meston, poet (born c. 1688)
- May – Rachel Chiesley, Lady Grange, abductee (born 1679)
