= 1746 in Scotland =

- Centuries: 16th; 17th; 18th; 19th; 20th
- Decades: 1720s; 1730s; 1740s; 1750s; 1760s
- See also: List of years in Scotland; Timeline of Scottish history 1746 in: Great Britain • Wales • Elsewhere

Events from the year 1746 in Scotland.

== Incumbents ==
- Secretary of State for Scotland: The Marquess of Tweeddale, until 3 January; then vacant until 1885

=== Law officers ===
- Lord Advocate – Robert Craigie; then William Grant of Prestongrange
- Solicitor General for Scotland – Robert Dundas, the younger; then Patrick Haldane of Gleneagles, jointly with Alexander Hume

=== Judiciary ===
- Lord President of the Court of Session – Lord Culloden
- Lord Justice General – Lord Ilay
- Lord Justice Clerk – Lord Milton

== Events ==
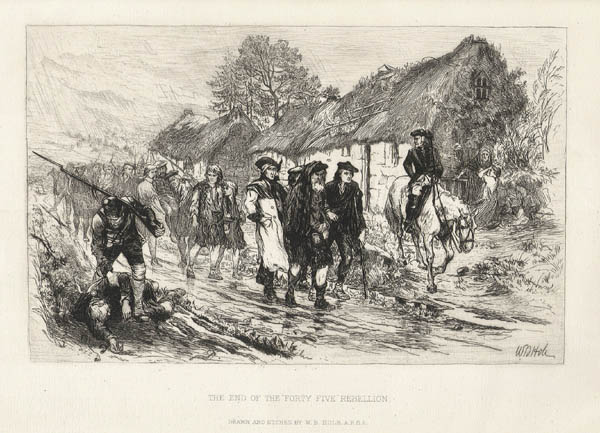
The End of the 'Forty Five' Rebellion

- 8 January – Jacobite rising of 1745: Charles Edward Stuart ("Bonnie Prince Charlie") with his Jacobite forces occupies Stirling.
- 17 January – Jacobite rising: Battle of Falkirk Muir – British Government troops are defeated by Jacobite forces.
- 1 February – as retreating Jacobite forces remove munitions stored in the church at St. Ninians (near Stirling), it blows up.
- 21 February – Jacobite rising: Siege of Inverness ends with British government forces surrendering Old Fort George to the Jacobite army under threat of mining.
- 8 April – Jacobite rising: Jacobite supporters sack Cullen House.
- 16 April – the Battle of Culloden, the final pitched battle fought on British soil, brings an end to the Jacobite rising of 1745.
- 3 May – Jacobite rising: "Battle of Loch nan Uamh" – Royal Navy sloops attack French privateers which have landed money (and brandy) intended to aid the Jacobite cause in the Sound of Arisaig.
- 28 May – Jacobite rising: British troops burn the old castle at Achnacarry.
- 27 June – Charles Edward Stuart flees to the Isle of Skye from Benbecula disguised as Flora MacDonald's maid.
- 1 August – Dress Act 1746 proscribes wearing of the tartan.
- 18 August – two rebel Scottish lords, the Earl of Kilmarnock and Lord Balmerinoch, are beheaded in the Tower of London.
- 20 September – Charles Edward Stuart escapes to France.
- October – foundation stone of new Inveraray Castle laid.
- British Linen Bank chartered as the British Linen Company.

== Births ==
- 27 March – Michael Bruce, poet and hymnist (died 1767)
- Approximate date – John Bogle, miniature painter (died 1803)

== Deaths ==
- 4 February – Robert Blair, "graveyard poet" (born 1699)
- 14 June – Colin Maclaurin, mathematician (born 1698)
- 8 August – Francis Hutcheson, theologian and philosopher (born 1694; died in Dublin)
- 6 December – Lady Grizel Baillie, songwriter (born 1665; died in London)

== Publications ==
- Matthew Stewart publishes Some General Theorems of Considerable use in the Higher Parts of Mathematics, including an account of Stewart's theorem on the measurement of the triangle.

== See also ==
- Timeline of Scottish history
