= 1753 in Scotland =

- Centuries: 16th; 17th; 18th; 19th; 20th
- Decades: 1730s; 1740s; 1750s; 1760s; 1770s
- See also: List of years in Scotland; Timeline of Scottish history 1753 in: Great Britain • Wales • Elsewhere

Events from the year 1753 in Scotland.

== Incumbents ==
=== Law officers ===
- Lord Advocate – William Grant of Prestongrange
- Solicitor General for Scotland – Patrick Haldane of Gleneagles, jointly with Alexander Hume

=== Judiciary ===
- Lord President of the Court of Session – Lord Arniston the Elder to 26 August; then vacant
- Lord Justice General – Lord Ilay
- Lord Justice Clerk – Lord Tinwald

== Events ==
- 7 June – Archibald Cameron of Lochiel (born 1707) becomes the last Jacobite to be executed for treason when he is hanged and beheaded at Tyburn in London under a bill of attainder. On 26 March he has returned from exile in France in the service of Charles Edward Stuart to retrieve the Loch Arkaig treasure and to participate in a desperate plot to assassinate George II of Great Britain and other members of the British royal family. However, while staying secretly at Brenachyle by Loch Katrine, he has been betrayed by Alastair Ruadh MacDonnell of Glengarry (the notorious spy "Pickle") and members of his own clan and arrested.
- July – the Parliament of Great Britain passes Lord Harwicke's Marriage Act 1753 "for the Better Preventing of Clandestine Marriage" in England and Wales; coming into force in 1754 it will give increased incentive for couples to contract Border marriages in Scotland.
- Old Bridge of Dee, Invercauld, completed by military engineer Edward Caulfield.
- Military road completed to Rest and Be Thankful.
- Bonawe ironworks begins casting.
- Whaling from Dundee begins.

== Births ==
- 27 March – Andrew Bell, educationist and Episcopalian minister (died 1832 in England)
- 12 May – George Gleig, Episcopalian Primus (died 1840)
- 22 November – Dugald Stewart, philosopher (died 1828)

== Deaths ==
- 26 August – Robert Dundas of Arniston, the elder, Lord President of the Court of Session 1748–53 (born 1685)
- 27 September – Sir John Anstruther, 1st Baronet, of Anstruther, politician (born c.1678)
- December – Thomas Melvill, meteorologist and philosopher (born 1726; died in Geneva)
- William Wishart, Principal of the University of Edinburgh (born c.1692)

== The arts ==
- Glasgow Literary Society formed.
- Foulis Academy formed in Glasgow by Robert Foulis to teach art.

== See also ==
- Timeline of Scottish history
