= 1744 in Scotland =

- Centuries: 16th; 17th; 18th; 19th; 20th
- Decades: 1720s; 1730s; 1740s; 1750s; 1760s
- See also: List of years in Scotland; Timeline of Scottish history 1744 in: Great Britain • Wales • Elsewhere

Events from the year 1744 in Scotland.

== Incumbents ==
- Secretary of State for Scotland: The Marquess of Tweeddale

=== Law officers ===
- Lord Advocate – Robert Craigie
- Solicitor General for Scotland – Robert Dundas, the younger

=== Judiciary ===
- Lord President of the Court of Session – Lord Culloden
- Lord Justice General – Lord Ilay
- Lord Justice Clerk – Lord Milton

== Events ==
- Alexander Bryce's "A Map of the North Coast of Britain", the first to show the Caithness coastline accurately, is published.
- The Honourable Company of Edinburgh Golfers established on Leith Links.
- Possible date – Edinburgh Skating Club established.

== Births ==
- 13 February – David Allan, genre painter (died 1796)
- 6 October – James McGill, entrepreneur and philanthropist in Canada (died 1813 in Canada)
- 17 October – Andrew Duncan, physician (died 1828)
- 31 October – James Craig, architect, planner of the New Town, Edinburgh (died 1795)

== Deaths ==
- 28 January – Thomas Innes, Catholic priest and historian (born 1662; died in France)
- 2 March – William Maxwell, 5th Earl of Nithsdale, Jacobite (born 1676; died in Italy)

== See also ==
- Timeline of Scottish history
