= 1828 in Scotland =

- Centuries: 17th; 18th; 19th; 20th; 21st
- Decades: 1800s; 1810s; 1820s; 1830s; 1840s
- See also: List of years in Scotland; Timeline of Scottish history 1828 in: The UK • Wales • Elsewhere

Events from the year 1828 in Scotland.

== Incumbents ==
=== Law officers ===
- Lord Advocate – Sir William Rae, Bt
- Solicitor General for Scotland – John Hope

=== Judiciary ===
- Lord President of the Court of Session – Lord Granton
- Lord Justice General – The Duke of Montrose
- Lord Justice Clerk – Lord Boyle

== Events ==
- 7 January – Rev. Henry Duncan describes his discovery of the fossil footmarks of quadrupeds (Chelichnus duncani) in Permian red sandstone at Cornockle Muir, near Lochmaben in Dumfriesshire, the first scientific report of a fossil track, in a paper read to the Royal Society of Edinburgh.
- 9 March – an English gang make off with £28,350 after holding up the Glasgow branch of the Greenock Bank.
- April – David Stow opens his Drygate model school in Glasgow.
- 15 June – 28 people are killed when the north gallery of the Old Kirk, Kirkcaldy, collapses during a sermon by popular preacher Edward Irving.
- 8 August – the Ballochney Railway (near Airdrie, horse worked) is completed throughout.
- 10 September – first public demonstration of Rev. Patrick Bell's reaping machine on his family's farm.
- 17–24 December – Burke and Hare murders trial in Edinburgh: William Burke is sentenced to hang for his part in the murder of 17 victims (up to 31 October) to provide bodies for dissection by anatomist Robert Knox; his accomplice William Hare is released having turned King's evidence.
- Inhabitants of the island of Muck emigrate to Nova Scotia.
- St Stephen's Church, Edinburgh, is completed to the design of William Henry Playfair.
- Caird & Company established by John Caird in Greenock as marine engineers.
- James Beaumont Neilson patents the hot blast process for ironmaking.
- A steam road coach constructed by James and George Naysmith runs between Leith and Queensferry.
- Glasgow Co-operative Society established.

== Births ==
- 4 April – Mrs. Oliphant, born Margaret Wilson, novelist and historical writer (died 1897 in London)
- 16 August – John Waddell, railway contractor (died 1888)
- 30 September – John Simpson Knox, soldier, recipient of the Victoria Cross (died 1897 in England)
- 5 October – Alexander Gunn, grocery wholesaler (died 1907 in Canada)
- 1 November – Balfour Stewart, physicist (died 1887 in Ireland)
- 13 December – Alexander Shand, 1st Baron Shand, judge (died 1904)
- Alexander Crum, textile printer and Liberal politician (died 1893)
- Robert Doull, merchant and politician (died 1906 in Canada)
- John Small, librarian and scholar (died 1886)

== Deaths ==
- 29 February – John Ainslie, cartographer (born 1745)
- 29 March – William Drummond of Logiealmond, diplomat and philosopher (born c.1770)
- 11 June – Dugald Stewart, Enlightenment philosopher (born 1753)
- 5 July – Andrew Duncan, physician (born 1744)
- 20 December – Archibald Fletcher, reforming lawyer (born 1746)
- 22 December – Robert Blair, astronomer (born 1748)

== The arts ==
- The Maitland Club is founded in Glasgow to edit and publish early Scottish texts.
- The Poetical Works of Thomas Campbell is published.
- Sir Walter Scott's novel The Fair Maid of Perth (or St. Valentine's Day; Chronicles of the Canongate, 2nd series) is published.

== See also ==
- 1828 in Ireland
