= 1748 in Scotland =

- Centuries: 16th; 17th; 18th; 19th; 20th
- Decades: 1720s; 1730s; 1740s; 1750s; 1760s
- See also: List of years in Scotland; Timeline of Scottish history 1748 in: Great Britain • Wales • Elsewhere

Events from the year 1748 in Scotland.

== Incumbents ==
=== Law officers ===
- Lord Advocate – William Grant of Prestongrange
- Solicitor General for Scotland – Patrick Haldane of Gleneagles, jointly with Alexander Hume

=== Judiciary ===
- Lord President of the Court of Session – Lord Culloden until 4 June; then Lord Arniston the Elder
- Lord Justice General – Lord Ilay
- Lord Justice Clerk – Lord Milton, then Lord Tinwald

== Events ==
- 1 April – under the Sheriffs (Scotland) Act 1747, trials for treason in Scotland can take place outside the shire in which the crime is committed.
- 24 June – on the death of his father William, John Adam inherits his architectural practice in Scotland and the position of Master Mason to the Board of Ordnance, immediately taking his brother Robert into partnership.
- 1 July – James Davidson, who had deserted from the Hanoverian army to support the Jacobites, is executed at Ruthrieston Cross near the Bridge of Dee in Aberdeen after being found guilty of several robberies in Angus and The Mearns.
- Construction of Fort George begins.
- Clergy of the Scottish Episcopal Church are forbidden to officiate unless ordained by an English (or Irish) bishop.
- Garron Bridge on the Inveraray Castle estate, designed by Roger Morris and/or his kin Robert Morris, is completed.
- A window tax is levied in Scotland.
- The Treason Outlawries (Scotland) Act 1748 comes into effect retrospectively.
- David Hume's An Enquiry Concerning Human Understanding is published.
- The Aberdeen Journal is first published under this title.

== Births ==
- 1 January – Archibald Cochrane, 9th Earl of Dundonald, nobleman and inventor (died 1831 in France)
- 10 March – John Playfair, scientist (died 1819)
- 27 December – William Marshall, fiddle player and composer (died 1833)
- Hugh Henry Brackenridge, writer, poet, lawyer, judge and Pennsylvania Supreme Court justice (died 1816 in the United States)

== Deaths ==
- 14 March – George Wade, British Army officer and road builder in Scotland (born 1673 in Ireland; died in England)
- 24 June – William Adam, architect (born 1689)
- 27 August – James Thomson, poet and playwright (born 1700; died in Richmond upon Thames)
- 26 October – Donald Cameron of Lochiel, "The Gentle Lochiel", clan chief and exiled Jacobite leader (born c. 1695; died in France)

== See also ==
- Timeline of Scottish history
