= 1743 in Scotland =

- Centuries: 16th; 17th; 18th; 19th; 20th
- Decades: 1720s; 1730s; 1740s; 1750s; 1760s
- See also: List of years in Scotland; Timeline of Scottish history 1743 in: Great Britain • Wales • Elsewhere

Events from the year 1743 in Scotland.

== Incumbents ==
- Secretary of State for Scotland: The Marquess of Tweeddale

=== Law officers ===
- Lord Advocate – Robert Craigie
- Solicitor General for Scotland – Robert Dundas, the younger

=== Judiciary ===
- Lord President of the Court of Session – Lord Culloden
- Lord Justice General – Lord Ilay
- Lord Justice Clerk – Lord Milton

== Events ==
- 17 May – Approximately 100 men of the 43rd Highland Regiment of Foot (the "Black Watch") desert while on the march to London; the ringleaders are executed on 18 July in the Tower of London.
- 27 June (16 June O.S.) – War of the Austrian Succession: Battle of Dettingen in Bavaria – British forces, including the Royal Scots Greys, the Scots Guards and the Royal Scots Fusiliers, in alliance with those of Hanover and Hesse, defeat the French; King George II of Great Britain (and Elector of Brunswick) leads his own troops, the last reigning British monarch to participate in a battle.
- 4 October – Archibald Campbell, Earl of Ilay succeeds his brother as 3rd Duke of Argyll.
- Robert Foulis becomes printer to the University of Glasgow.
- Probable date – The last wolf in Scotland is shot in Killiecrankie.

== Births ==
- 18 June – Alexander Gordon, 4th Duke of Gordon, born Marquess of Huntly, clan chief (died 1827 in England)
- William Saunders, physician, first President of the Medical and Chirurgical Society of London (died 1817 in England)

== Deaths ==
- 6 May – Andrew Michael Ramsay, Catholic Jacobite scholar (born 1686; died in France)
- 4 October – John Campbell, 2nd Duke of Argyll, soldier (born 1678 in England; died in England)

== See also ==
- Timeline of Scottish history
