= 1791 in Scotland =

- Centuries: 16th; 17th; 18th; 19th; 20th
- Decades: 1770s; 1780s; 1790s; 1800s; 1810s
- See also: List of years in Scotland; Timeline of Scottish history 1791 in: Great Britain • Wales • Elsewhere

Events from the year 1791 in Scotland.

== Incumbents ==
=== Law officers ===
- Lord Advocate – Robert Dundas of Arniston
- Solicitor General for Scotland – Robert Blair

=== Judiciary ===
- Lord President of the Court of Session – Lord Succoth
- Lord Justice General – The Viscount Stormont
- Lord Justice Clerk – Lord Braxfield

== Events ==
- 22 August – Galloway Association of Glasgow founded as the Glasgow Galloway Brotherly Society.
- Agriculturalist Sir John Sinclair imports ewes of Cheviot sheep from the Northumberland/Scottish Borders to Caithness and Sutherland where they will form the basis of the North Country Cheviot breed.

== Publications ==
- Francis Grose – The Antiquities of Scotland, volume 2
- Sir John Sinclair – Statistical Account of Scotland, begins publication, introducing the term Statistics into English

== Births ==
- April – William Mackenzie, ophthalmologist (died 1868)
- 21 June – Robert Napier, engineer, "Father of Clyde Shipbuilding" (died 1876)
- 4 September – Robert Knox, surgeon, anatomist and zoologist (died 1862 in England)
- 7 November – Robert Nasmyth, dental surgeon (died 1870)

== Deaths ==
- 29 March – Elspeth Buchan, millenarian prophet, founder of the Buchanites (born c. 1738)
- 7 July – Thomas Blacklock, poet (born 1721)
- Approximate date – Alan Breck Stewart, Jacobite (born c. 1711; died in exile)

== The arts ==
- Poet Robert Burns gives up farming for a full-time post as an exciseman in Dumfries, writes "Ae Fond Kiss", "The Banks O' Doon" and "Sweet Afton", and publishes his last major poem, the narrative "Tam o' Shanter" (written 1790 and first published on 18 March 1791 in the Edinburgh Herald).

== Sport ==
- Burntisland Golf Club founded.
