= 1834 in Scotland =

- Centuries: 17th; 18th; 19th; 20th; 21st
- Decades: 1810s; 1820s; 1830s; 1840s; 1850s
- See also: List of years in Scotland; Timeline of Scottish history 1834 in: The UK • Wales • Elsewhere

Events from the year 1834 in Scotland.

== Incumbents ==
=== Law officers ===
- Lord Advocate – Francis Jeffrey until May; then John Murray until November; then Sir William Rae, Bt
- Solicitor General for Scotland – Henry Cockburn; then Andrew Skene; then Duncan McNeill

=== Judiciary ===
- Lord President of the Court of Session – Lord Granton
- Lord Justice General – The Duke of Montrose
- Lord Justice Clerk – Lord Boyle

== Events ==
- May – Dean Bridge in Edinburgh opened to horse and cart traffic.
- 29 July – a steam carriage designed by John Scott Russell on the Glasgow–Paisley road overturns and suffers a boiler explosion causing the death of four passengers.
- 11 September – emigrant ship Sybelle out of Cromarty wrecked off St. Paul Island (Nova Scotia) with the loss of all 316 passengers and all but six of her crew.
- 9 October – first shipment of tea direct from India arrives at the Broomielaw quay in Glasgow.
- 26 December – Ursulines of Jesus take up residence at St Margaret’s Convent in the Whitehouse in Edinburgh, the first Roman Catholic convent established in Scotland since the Reformation; it will be another 5 years before the first such modern establishment in England.
- Naval architect John Scott Russell first observes a nondecaying solitary wave (a soliton, which he calls "the Wave of Translation") while watching a boat hauled through the water of the Union Canal near Edinburgh, subsequently using a tank to study the dependence of solitary wave velocities on amplitude and liquid depth.
- Thomas Henderson is appointed first Astronomer Royal for Scotland.
- Edinburgh Geological Society is established.
- Princess Royal Maternity Hospital is established as the Glasgow Lying-in Hospital and Dispensary.
- Annan Bridge built by Robert Stevenson.
- Moffat Academy is established by merger of the local grammar and parish schools.
- Charles Randolph establishes the millwrighting business of Randolph & Elliott in the Tradeston district of Glasgow, predecessor of the Fairfield Shipbuilding and Engineering Company.
- The McGeoch family establish a pawnbrokers in Paisley, predecessor of the chain store M&Co. (Mackays).
- The Second (New) Statistical Account of Scotland begins publication under the auspices of the General Assembly of the Church of Scotland.
- The Evangelical Thomas Chalmers becomes chairman of the General Assembly's church extension committee.
- The Royal and Ancient Golf Club of St Andrews gains its royal patronage.

== Births ==
- 27 January – Alexander Asher, politician and Solicitor General for Scotland (died 1905)
- 16 March – James Hector, geologist (died 1907 in New Zealand)
- 5 April – Robert Rowand Anderson, architect (died 1921)
- 12 April – William Hope, soldier, recipient of the Victorian Cross (died 1909 in London)
- 27 April – Margaret Macpherson Grant, heiress and philanthropist (died 1877)
- 4 July – Christopher Dresser, designer influential in the Anglo-Japanese style (died 1904 in England)
- 22 August – George Kynoch, businessman (died 1891 in South Africa)
- 17 September – Robert Simpson, retail merchant (died 1897 in Canada)
- 1 October – Mary Mackellar, née Cameron, Gaelic poet and translator (died 1890)
- 12 October – Mark MacTaggart-Stewart, né Stewart, politician (died 1923)
- 23 November – James Thomson ("B.V."), poet (died 1882 in London)
- Probable date – Peter Dodds McCormick, schoolteacher, composer of the Australian national anthem (died 1916 in Australia)

== Deaths ==
- 26 March – Jean Armour, widow of Robert Burns (born 1765)
- 9 June – John Henry Wishart, surgeon (born 1781)
- 12 July – David Douglas, botanist (born 1799; died in Hawaii)
- 2 September – Thomas Telford, civil engineer (born 1757; died in London)
- 16 September – William Blackwood, publisher and writer (born 1776)
- 21 September – Robert Edmonstone, painter (born 1794)
- 24 November – John Gillies, botanist (born 1792)
- 5 December – Thomas Pringle, writer, poet and abolitionist (born 1789; died in London)
- 7 December – Edward Irving, founder of the Catholic Apostolic Church (born 1792)
- Anne Forbes, portrait painter (born 1745)
- Probable date – Sarah Bezra Nicol, actress (born in England)

== See also ==
- 1834 in Ireland
