= 1750 in Scotland =

- Centuries: 16th; 17th; 18th; 19th; 20th
- Decades: 1730s; 1740s; 1750s; 1760s; 1770s
- See also: List of years in Scotland; Timeline of Scottish history 1750 in: Great Britain • Wales • Elsewhere

Events from the year 1750 in Scotland.

== Incumbents ==
=== Law officers ===
- Lord Advocate – William Grant of Prestongrange
- Solicitor General for Scotland – Patrick Haldane of Gleneagles, jointly with Alexander Hume

=== Judiciary ===
- Lord President of the Court of Session – Lord Arniston the Elder
- Lord Justice General – Lord Ilay
- Lord Justice Clerk – Lord Tinwald

== Events ==
- Robert Gordon's College, Aberdeen, opens.
- James Short's Gregorian telescope (38 cm (14″) aperture reflector), the world's largest at this date, is constructed.
- Approximate date – Alexander Stephen begins shipbuilding at Burghead on the Moray Firth, origin of Alexander Stephen and Sons.

== Births ==
- 7 January – Robert Anderson, literary editor (died 1803)
- 18 February – David Bogue, nonconformist leader (died 1825 in England)
- 27 May – George Hill, Church of Scotland minister and academic (died 1819)
- 15 July (bapt.) – Robert Jackson, military physician and surgeon (died 1827 in England)
- 5 September – Robert Fergusson, poet writing in Braid Scots (died 1774)
- 14 October – John Fraser, botanist (died 1811 in England)
- 3 December – Hew Whitefoord Dalrymple, British Army general and Governor of Gibraltar (died 1830 in England)
- 8 December – Lady Anne Barnard, née Lindsay, poet, ballad and travel writer (died 1825 in England)
- William Dunbar, merchant, plantation owner, naturalist, astronomer and explorer (died 1810 in the United States)
- Approximate date – George Robertson, topographical, agricultural and genealogical writer (died 1832)

== Deaths ==
- 5 March – Sir Alexander Reid, 2nd Baronet, laird and politician
- 3 May – John Willison, evangelical Church of Scotland minister and religious writer (born 1680)

== See also ==
- Timeline of Scottish history
