= 1794 in Scotland =

- Centuries: 16th; 17th; 18th; 19th; 20th
- Decades: 1770s; 1780s; 1790s; 1800s; 1810s
- See also: List of years in Scotland; Timeline of Scottish history 1794 in: Great Britain • Wales • Elsewhere

Events from the year 1794 in Scotland.

== Incumbents ==
=== Law officers ===
- Lord Advocate – Robert Dundas of Arniston
- Solicitor General for Scotland – Robert Blair

=== Judiciary ===
- Lord President of the Court of Session – Lord Succoth
- Lord Justice General – The Viscount Stormont
- Lord Justice Clerk – Lord Braxfield

== Events ==
- 10 February – Alexander Gordon, 4th Duke of Gordon, authorized to raise the 92nd (Gordon Highlanders) Regiment of Foot (first parades 24 June). This year also the Duke becomes Keeper of the Great Seal of Scotland.
- May – Habeas corpus suspended. Robert Watt, who has plotted to seize Edinburgh Castle, is tried and executed for treason.
- November – Irish inventor Richard Lovell Edgeworth demonstrates a semaphore line from Donaghadee across the Irish Sea to Portpatrick.
- December – Glasgow Royal Infirmary opens.
- Lords lieutenant appointed permanently across Scotland by royal warrant.
- Glengarry Fencibles formed by Alexander Ranaldson Macdonell of Clan MacDonell of Glengarry, perhaps the first military unit to wear the Glengarry bonnet.
- The Ayrshire (Earl of Carrick's Own) Yeomanry, a Yeomanry Cavalry Regiment, is formed by the Earl of Cassillis at Culzean Castle, Ayrshire (approximate date).
- Original Pentland Skerries lighthouse on Muckle Skerry built, engineered by Thomas Smith with the work superintendend by his stepson Robert Stevenson, the latter's first official work for the Commissioners of Northern Light Houses.
- Oban distillery established by brothers John and Hugh Stevenson.

== Births ==
- 12 June – John Gibson Lockhart, writer and editor (died 1854)
- 28 October – Robert Liston, pioneering surgeon (died 1847)
- 12 November – Thomas Grainger, civil engineer and surveyor (died 1852)
- 27 December – Alexander Gordon Laing, explorer (killed 1826 in Timbuktu)
- Undated – Robert Edmonstone, painter (died 1834)

== Deaths ==
- 23 February – James Playfair, neoclassical architect (born 1755)
- 27 April – James Bruce, explorer (born 1716)
- 18 June – James Murray, military officer and administrator (born 1721)
- 23 June – James Graham, quack doctor (born 1745)
- 13 July – James Lind, naval physician (born 1716)
- 20 October – James Adam, architect and furniture designer (born 1732)
- 22 November – Alison Cockburn, writer and literary hostess (born 1713)
- 30 December – Archibald Kennedy, 11th Earl of Cassilis

== The arts ==
- 8 May – Robert Burns' song Scots Wha Hae published in The Morning Chronicle.
- 25 June – Burns sets out on his second Galloway tour.
- Joseph Ritson's anthology Scottish Song is published.
