= 1830 in Scotland =

- Centuries: 17th; 18th; 19th; 20th; 21st
- Decades: 1810s; 1820s; 1830s; 1840s; 1850s
- See also: List of years in Scotland; Timeline of Scottish history 1830 in: The UK • Wales • Elsewhere

Events from the year 1830 in Scotland.

== Incumbents ==
=== Law officers ===
- Lord Advocate – Sir William Rae, Bt until December; then Francis Jeffrey
- Solicitor General for Scotland – John Hope; then Henry Cockburn

=== Judiciary ===
- Lord President of the Court of Session – Lord Granton
- Lord Justice General – The Duke of Montrose
- Lord Justice Clerk – Lord Boyle

== Events ==
- 19 March – The suspension bridge at Montrose partly collapses due to movement of a crowd watching a boat race from it, with the loss of at least 4 lives.
- 17 May – A meteorite falls on the North Inch at Perth.
- 27 May – Rev. Alexander Duff arrives in Calcutta as the Church of Scotland's first missionary to India.
- 13 July – Alexander Duff co-founds the General Assembly's Institution, the modern-day Scottish Church College, in Calcutta.
- November – Wellington Suspension Bridge over the River Dee at Aberdeen is opened to pedestrians.
- 16 December – Bridge of Don at Aberdeen is opened.
- Twin-hulled iron paddle steamer Lord Dundas built for service on the Forth and Clyde Canal.
- McVitie's founded as McVitie & Price's biscuit bakery in Rose Street, Edinburgh.
- Annandale distillery opened and Talisker distillery founded.
- Sheep dip is invented by George Wilson of Coldstream.

== Births ==
- Early – Andrew Halliday, journalist and playwright (died 1877 in London)
- 5 February – Lieutenant General James John McLeod Innes, recipient of the Victoria Cross (died 1907)
- 5 March – Charles Wyville Thomson, marine zoologist (died 1882)
- 15 March – John Ferguson, politician (died 1906 in Australia)
- 5 April
  - (probable date) Robert Francis Fairlie, steam locomotive designer (died 1885 in London)
  - Alexander Muir, songwriter (died 1906 in Canada)
- 16 July – Alexander Carnegie Kirk, mechanical engineer (died 1892)
- 3 September – Lewis Campbell, classicist (died 1908 in Switzerland)
- 21 September – John Holms, textile mill owner and Liberal politician (died 1891)
- 22 October – Arthur John Burns, woollen mill owner and politician in Otago (died 1901 in New Zealand)
- 30 October – Eliza Brightwen, naturalist (died 1906 in England)
- John Crawford, sculptor (died 1861)

== Deaths ==
- 14 January – The Right Reverend Daniel Sandford, Bishop of Edinburgh (born 1766, near Dublin)
- 20 February – Robert Anderson, literary editor, biographer and critic (born 1750)
- 7 April – Henry Bell, engineer who introduced the first successful passenger steamboat service in Europe (born 1767)
- 3 July – John Campbell, advocate and politician (born 1798)
- 16 December – Sir James Donaldson printer and newspaper publisher, who bequeathed a large part of his estate to the founding of Donaldson's Hospital (born 1751)

== The arts ==
- Thomas Aird publishes his narrative poem The Captive of Fez.
- Sir Walter Scott publishes the plays Auchindrane and The Doom of Devorgoil.
- David Wilkie appointed Principal Painter in Ordinary to King William IV
- Completion of publication of the Edinburgh Encyclopædia, commenced in 1808
- 16 December – Felix Mendelssohn completes composition of his concert overture The Hebrides as Die einsame Insel ("The Lonely Island").

== See also ==
- 1830 in Ireland
