= 1738 in Scotland =

- Centuries: 16th; 17th; 18th; 19th; 20th
- Decades: 1710s; 1720s; 1730s; 1740s; 1750s
- See also: List of years in Scotland; Timeline of Scottish history 1738 in: Great Britain • Wales • Elsewhere

Events from the year 1738 in Scotland.

== Incumbents ==
- Secretary of State for Scotland: vacant

=== Law officers ===
- Lord Advocate – Charles Erskine
- Solicitor General for Scotland – William Grant of Prestongrange

=== Judiciary ===
- Lord President of the Court of Session – Lord Culloden
- Lord Justice General – Lord Ilay
- Lord Justice Clerk – Lord Milton

== Events ==
- 22 May – foundation stone of George Watson's College in Edinburgh is laid.
- Anderston Weavers' Society established in Glasgow.

== Births ==
- 19 May – Sir James Grant, 8th Baronet, politician (died 1811)
- 12 December (bapt.) – William Cochran, portrait painter (died 1785)
- 19 December – James Playfair, minister of religion and scholar (died 1819)
- Alexander Henderson, merchant and politician in Virginia, "father of the American chain store" (died 1815 in the United States)
- Probable date – James Dickson, botanist (died 1822 in London)

== Deaths ==
- 4 January – George Douglas, 13th Earl of Morton, politician (born 1662)
- 25 March – Robert Murray, British Army officer and politician (born 1689)

== See also ==
- Timeline of Scottish history
