= 1747 in Scotland =

- Centuries: 16th; 17th; 18th; 19th; 20th
- Decades: 1720s; 1730s; 1740s; 1750s; 1760s
- See also: List of years in Scotland; Timeline of Scottish history 1747 in: Great Britain • Wales • Elsewhere

Events from the year 1747 in Scotland.

== Incumbents ==
=== Law officers ===
- Lord Advocate – William Grant of Prestongrange
- Solicitor General for Scotland – Patrick Haldane of Gleneagles, jointly with Alexander Hume

=== Judiciary ===
- Lord President of the Court of Session – Lord Culloden
- Lord Justice General – Lord Ilay
- Lord Justice Clerk – Lord Milton

== Events ==
- 8 May – Veteran sails from Liverpool with 149 Jacobite prisoners (including 15 women) on board to be settled as indentured slaves in the West Indies. On 28 June, the French privateer Diamant captures the ship and frees the slaves.
- May – abolition of Hereditable Jurisdictions Act breaks the power of the clans.
- 17 June – Vesting Act authorizes Scottish Court of Exchequer to inquire into the value of estates forfeited from participants in the Jacobite rising of 1745, most forfeitures being upheld, although the Indemnity Act lifts some legal penalties from the participants.
- 29 December – The Press and Journal begins publication as a weekly, Aberdeen's Journal.
- Sheriffs (Scotland) Act 1747 provides that trials for treason in Scotland can take place outside the shire in which the crime is committed.
- William Roy's military survey of Scotland begins.
- James Lind undertakes one of the first controlled experiments in clinical medicine, on the effect of citrus fruit as a cure for scurvy.

== Births ==
- 18 January – John Gillies, historian and classical scholar (died 1836)
- 6 July – John Paul Jones, Arbigland-born sailor and the United States's first well-known naval fighter in the American Revolution (died 1792 in France)

== Deaths ==
- 9 April – Simon Fraser, 11th Lord Lovat (title forfeited), Jacobite clan chief (born c. 1667; beheaded on Tower Hill, London)
- 9 May – John Dalrymple, 2nd Earl of Stair, soldier and diplomat (born 1673)
- 10 December – Duncan Forbes, Lord Culloden, politician and judge, President of the Court of Session (born 1685)

== The arts ==
- A theatre is established at Playhouse Close in The Canongate of Edinburgh.
- John Home's blank verse tragedy Agis is written.
