= 1796 in Scotland =

- Centuries: 16th; 17th; 18th; 19th; 20th
- Decades: 1770s; 1780s; 1790s; 1800s; 1810s
- See also: List of years in Scotland; Timeline of Scottish history 1796 in: Great Britain • Wales • Elsewhere

Events from the year 1796 in Scotland.

== Incumbents ==
=== Law officers ===
- Lord Advocate – Robert Dundas of Arniston
- Solicitor General for Scotland – Robert Blair

=== Judiciary ===
- Lord President of the Court of Session – Lord Succoth
- Lord Justice General – The Duke of Montrose
- Lord Justice Clerk – Lord Braxfield

== Events ==
- 13 January – the Royal Technical College in Glasgow, predecessor of the University of Strathclyde, is founded under the will of Professor John Anderson.
- February – Thomas Muir of Huntershill, imprisoned for sedition, escapes from the Australian penal colony at Sydney Cove on Otter.
- 21 June – Scottish explorer Mungo Park becomes the first European to reach the Niger River.
- Formation of a reforming Whig party in Edinburgh under the leadership of lawyer Henry Erskine.
- Argyll Mausoleum at Kilmun Parish Church completed.
- Lodges of the Order of Free Gardeners inaugurated at Arbroath, Bothwell and Cumbnathan.

== Births ==
- 25 January – William MacGillivray, naturalist (died 1852)
- 20 April – George Gleig, soldier, military writer and priest (died 1888 in England)
- 13 September – James Finlay Weir Johnston, chemist (died 1855)
- 17 October – James Matheson, Member of Parliament and co-founder of Jardine, Matheson & Co. (died 1878)
- 24 October – David Roberts, Orientalist landscape painter (died 1864 in London)
- unknown date – John Duncan, theologian and Hebraist (died 1870)

== Deaths ==
- 13 January – John Anderson, natural philosopher and scientist (born 1726)
- 12 February – John Hamilton, Member of Parliament for Wigtown Burghs and Wigtownshire (born 1715)
- 17 February – James Macpherson, poet, "translator" of Ossian (born 1736)
- 21 July – Robert Burns, poet (born 1759)
- 6 August – David Allan, painter (born 1744)
- 29 September – John Cunningham, 15th Earl of Glencairn, nobleman, cavalry officer and priest (born 1749)
- October – Thomas Christie, radical political writer (born 1761; died in Suriname)
- 7 October – Thomas Reid, philosopher (born 1710)
- 24 December – John Maclaurin, Lord Dreghorn, judge and poet (born 1734)

== The arts ==
- 21 July – death of the national poet, Robert Burns, in Dumfries, at the age of 37. His funeral (with honours as a military volunteer) takes place on 25 July while his wife, Jean, is in labour with their ninth child together, Maxwell. Burns is at first buried in the far corner of St. Michael's Churchyard in Dumfries. The volume of The Scots Musical Museum published this year includes his versions of "Auld Lang Syne" and "Charlie Is My Darling".
- 26-year-old Walter Scott publishes his first work, the ballad "The Chase" – an English language translation of Gottfried August Bürger's Der Wilde Jäger.
