= 1833 in Scotland =

- Centuries: 17th; 18th; 19th; 20th; 21st
- Decades: 1810s; 1820s; 1830s; 1840s; 1850s
- See also: List of years in Scotland; Timeline of Scottish history 1833 in: The UK • Wales • Elsewhere

Events from the year 1833 in Scotland.

== Incumbents ==
=== Law officers ===
- Lord Advocate – Francis Jeffrey
- Solicitor General for Scotland – Henry Cockburn

=== Judiciary ===
- Lord President of the Court of Session – Lord Granton
- Lord Justice General – The Duke of Montrose
- Lord Justice Clerk – Lord Boyle

== Events ==
- 16 March – at an auction of the art collection of John Clerk, Lord Eldin (died 1832) at his home in Picardy Place, Edinburgh, the floor collapses, killing the banker Alexander Smith.
- April – Glasgow Necropolis opened.
- 10 April – St Peter's RC Primary School, Aberdeen, founded.
- 28 August –– the Slavery Abolition Act receives royal assent, abolishing slavery in most of the British Empire. A £20 million fund is established to compensate slaveowners, many of whom are in Scotland.
- 7 October – the Edinburgh Emancipation Society, Edinburgh Ladies' Emancipation Society, Glasgow Emancipation Society and Glasgow Ladies' Emancipation Society are formed in support of abolitionism.
- 30 October – Edinburgh Town Council first allows newspaper reporters to attend its meetings.
- Burgh Police (Scotland) Act permits burghs to establish themselves as police burghs, having powers to provide policing and to pave and light streets.
- Glengoyne distillery is established as the Burnfoot distillery by George Connell on the Highland line near Dumgoyne.
- John Menzies is established as a newsagent in Edinburgh.
- Madras College is established in St Andrews by merger of the grammar and English schools under the bequest of locally-born educationalist Rev. Dr. Andrew Bell (died 1832), promoter of the 'Madras system' of education.
- Chemist Thomas Graham proposes Graham's law.
- Statue of William Pitt the Younger (died 1806) erected in George Street, Edinburgh.
- The Royal Perth Golfing Society gains its royal patronage.

== Births ==
- 1 January – Robert Lawson, architect (died 1902 in New Zealand)
- 24 February – William Howie Wylie, journalist and Baptist (died 1891)
- 20 March – Daniel Dunglas Home, medium (died 1886 in France)
- 16 April – John Malcolm, 1st Baron Malcolm, soldier and politician (died 1902 in France)
- 22 April – John Waldie, politician in Ontario (died 1907 in Canada)
- 16 July – Donald Reid, landowner, businessman and politician in Otago (died 1919 in New Zealand)
- 26 July – Alexander Henry Rhind, antiquarian and Egyptologist (died 1863 in Italy)
- 12 August – Aylmer Cameron, soldier, recipient of the Victoria Cross (died 1909 in England)
- 12 November – George Paul Chalmers, painter (killed 1878)
- 14 December – Alexander Young, mechanical engineer and government official in Hawaii (died 1910 in Honolulu)

== Deaths ==
- 3 May – James Bell, geographical writer (born 1769)
- 29 May – William Marshall, fiddle player and composer (born 1748)
- August – Andrew Cochrane-Johnstone, soldier, colonial governor and fraudster (born 1767; died in France)
- 10 October – Thomas Atkinson, poet, bookseller and politician (born c.1801; died at sea)
- 11 November – James Grant, naval officer (born 1772; died in France)
- 30 November – William Bannatyne, Lord Bannatyne, lawyer and antiquarian (born 1743)

== The arts ==
- May – the final revised edition of The Poetical Works of Sir Walter Scott, Bart, edited by Scott's son-in-law J. G. Lockhart, begins publication.
- Allan Cunningham's poem The Maid of Elvar is published.

== See also ==
- 1833 in Ireland
