= 1863 in Scotland =

- Centuries: 17th; 18th; 19th; 20th; 21st
- Decades: 1840s; 1850s; 1860s; 1870s; 1880s
- See also: List of years in Scotland; Timeline of Scottish history 1863 in: The UK • Wales • Elsewhere

Events from the year 1863 in Scotland.

== Incumbents ==
=== Law officers ===
- Lord Advocate – James Moncreiff
- Solicitor General for Scotland – George Young

=== Judiciary ===
- Lord President of the Court of Session and Lord Justice General – Lord Colonsay
- Lord Justice Clerk – Lord Glenalmond

== Events ==
- 10 January – steamer Bussorah is lost off Islay with all 33 hands on her maiden voyage.
- 17 September – royal burgh of Linlithgow enters bankruptcy.
- 18 September – Willie Park wins his second Open Championship title at Prestwick Golf Club.
- 13 October – the Provostship of Aberdeen is elevated to Lord Provost.
- Overtoun House is completed.

== Births ==
- 15 February – Charlotte Ainslie, educationalist and headmistress (died 1960)
- 2 April – William Adamson, trade unionist and politician, leader of the Labour Party (1917–21) and Secretary of State for Scotland (1924 & 1929–31) (died 1936)
- 17 May – Stewart Gray, lawyer, campaigner for social justice and patron of the arts (died 1937 in England)
- 3 June – Neil Munro, writer (died 1930)
- 1 September – Violet Jacob, born Violet Kennedy-Erskine, historical novelist and poet (died 1946)
- 13 September – Arthur Henderson, first Labour Party cabinet minister and winner of the Nobel Peace Prize (died 1935 in England)
- 5 December – George Pirie, painter (died 1946)

== Deaths ==
- 3 July – Alexander Henry Rhind, antiquarian and Egyptologist (born 1833; died in Italy)
- 14 August – Colin Campbell, army commander (born 1792; died in England)

== The arts ==
- Uilleam Mac Dhun Lèibhe (William Livingston)'s Gaelic poem on the Clearances on his native Islay, Fios Thun A' Bhard, is published as a broadsheet in Glasgow.
- George MacDonald's novel David Elginbrod is published.

== See also ==
- Timeline of Scottish history
- 1863 in the United Kingdom
- 1863 in Ireland
