= 1792 in Scotland =

- Centuries: 16th; 17th; 18th; 19th; 20th
- Decades: 1770s; 1780s; 1790s; 1800s; 1810s
- See also: List of years in Scotland; Timeline of Scottish history 1792 in: Great Britain • Wales • Elsewhere

Events from the year 1792 in Scotland.

== Incumbents ==
=== Law officers ===
- Lord Advocate – Robert Dundas of Arniston
- Solicitor General for Scotland – Robert Blair

=== Judiciary ===
- Lord President of the Court of Session – Lord Succoth
- Lord Justice General – The Viscount Stormont
- Lord Justice Clerk – Lord Braxfield

== Events ==
- "Year of the Sheep" in the Scottish Highlands: mass emigration of crofters following Clearances for grazing.
- 4 June – King's birthday riot in Edinburgh.
- 26 July – Associated Friends of the People for Parliamentary Reform constituted in Edinburgh.
- 13 November – Successes of the French Revolutionary Army are celebrated with bonfires and bell-ringing in Dundee and Perth causing the 42nd Regiment of Foot to be sent north to the towns.
- 11 December – First National Convention of the Scottish Friends of the People meets in Edinburgh to demand parliamentary reform.
- The first steam winding engine at a Scottish colliery is erected at Barrachnie in the Monklands coalfield.
- Clachan Bridge, connecting Seil to the mainland, is built to the design of John Stevenson of Oban revised by Robert Mylne.
- Inverness Royal Academy opened as a co-educational school.

== Births ==
- 19 February – Roderick Murchison, geologist (died 1871)
- 22 June – James Beaumont Neilson, ironmaster (died 1865)
- 4 August – Edward Irving, founder of the Catholic Apostolic Church (died 1834)
- 20 October – Colin Campbell, army officer (died 1863)
- date unknown – John Gillies, botanist (died 1834)

== Deaths ==
- January – Jenny Clow ("Clarinda"), domestic servant, a mistress and muse of Robert Burns, of tuberculosis (born 1766)
- 3 March – Robert Adam, architect (born 1728)
- 10 March – John Stuart, 3rd Earl of Bute, Prime Minister of Great Britain (born 1713)
- 29 April – George Vanden-Bempde, 3rd Marquess of Annandale (born 1720)
- 25 June – John Adam, architect (born 1721)
- 18 July – John Paul Jones, Scottish-born sailor and the United States' first well-known naval fighter in the American Revolution (born 1747)
- 19 December – Mary Bulkley, actress (born 1747 or 1748 in England)

== The arts ==
- 29 September – opening of Theatre Royal, Dumfries as The Theatre. By the 21st century this will be the oldest working theatre in Scotland.
- Robert Burns composes the song "Highland Mary".
- Publication of The Poetical Works of Janet Little, the Scotch Milkmaid.
