= 1793 in Scotland =

- Centuries: 16th; 17th; 18th; 19th; 20th
- Decades: 1770s; 1780s; 1790s; 1800s; 1810s
- See also: List of years in Scotland; Timeline of Scottish history 1793 in: Great Britain • Wales • Elsewhere

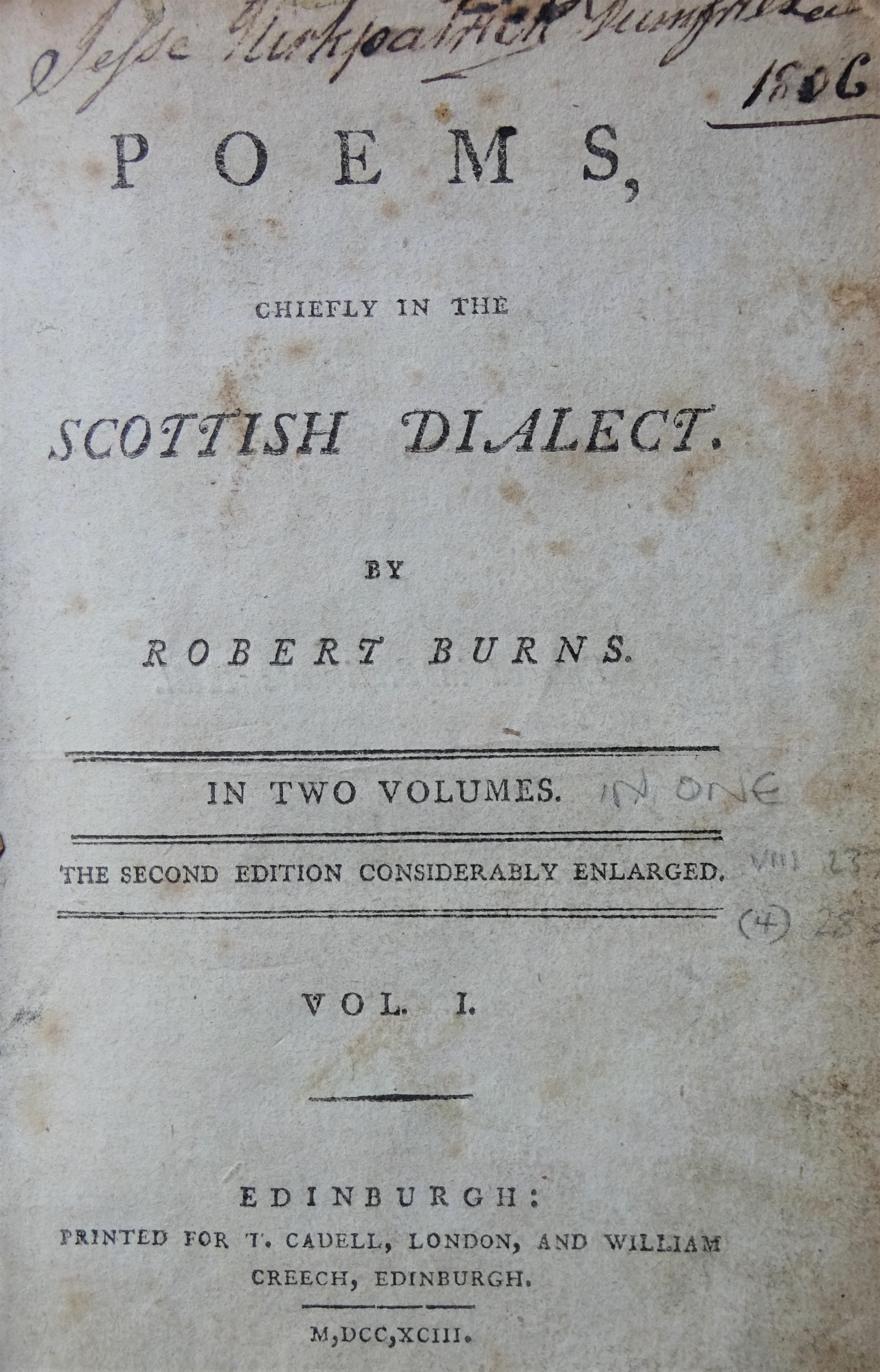
Poems, Chiefly in the Scottish Dialect by Robert Burns, 1793

Events from the year 1793 in Scotland.

== Incumbents ==
=== Law officers ===
- Lord Advocate – Robert Dundas of Arniston
- Solicitor General for Scotland – Robert Blair

=== Judiciary ===
- Lord President of the Court of Session – Lord Succoth
- Lord Justice General – The Viscount Stormont
- Lord Justice Clerk – Lord Braxfield

== Events ==
- 2 January – Radical Thomas Muir of Huntershill arrested on a charge of sedition but released on bail.
- 20 July – Stornoway-born explorer Alexander Mackenzie's 1792–1793 Peace River expedition to the Pacific Ocean reaches its goal at Bella Coola, British Columbia, making him the first known person to complete a transcontinental crossing of northern North America.
- 17 August – 79th Regiment of Foot (Cameronian Volunteers) raised at Fort William from members of Clan Cameron by Alan Cameron of Erracht.
- 24 August – Thomas Muir arrested at Portpatrick on his return from France.
- 31 August – Thomas Muir sentenced to penal transportation for 14 years.
- Little Cumbrae Lighthouse built.
- Piershill Barracks in Edinburgh and Queen's Barracks in Perth completed, originally for cavalry regiments.

== Births ==
- 6 March – William Dick, founder of Edinburgh Veterinary College (died 1866)
- 3 April – Alexander Nicoll, Orientalist (died 1828 in Oxford)
- 1 June – Henry Francis Lyte, Anglican divine and hymn-writer (died 1847 in Nice)
- James Browne, man of letters (died 1841)

== Deaths ==
- 5 January – John Howie, biographer (born 1735)
- 2 February – William Aiton, botanist (born 1731)
- 20 March – William Murray, 1st Earl of Mansfield, judge and politician (born 1705)
- 2 April or May – Colin Macfarquhar, bookseller and printer, co-founder of Encyclopædia Britannica (born 1744 or 1745?)
- 11 June – William Robertson, historian and Principal of the University of Edinburgh (born 1721)
- 16 October – John Hunter, surgeon (born 1728)
- James Small, inventor (born 1740)

== The arts ==
- 27 July – Robert Burns sets out on his first Galloway tour.
- August – Burns writes "Scots Wha Hae".
