= 1852 in Scotland =

- Centuries: 17th; 18th; 19th; 20th; 21st
- Decades: 1830s; 1840s; 1850s; 1860s; 1870s
- See also: List of years in Scotland; Timeline of Scottish history 1852 in: The UK • Wales • Elsewhere

Events from the year 1852 in Scotland.

== Incumbents ==
=== Law officers ===
- Lord Advocate – James Moncreiff until February; then Adam Anderson until May; then John Inglis until December; then James Moncreiff
- Solicitor General for Scotland – George Deas; then John Inglis; then Charles Neaves

=== Judiciary ===
- Lord President of the Court of Session and Lord Justice General – Lord Boyle until 5 May; then from 14 May Lord Colonsay
- Lord Justice Clerk – Lord Glencorse

== Events ==
- 7–31 July – United Kingdom general election results in Conservative Party defeat in Scotland but victory across the UK as a whole.
- 1 October – Patent Law Amendment Act comes into effect, merging the English, Scottish and Irish patent systems.
- 28 December – Edinburgh-born George Hamilton-Gordon, 4th Earl of Aberdeen, becomes Prime Minister of the United Kingdom, leading a Whig-Peelite coalition.
- Kelvingrove Park laid out as West End Park in Glasgow.
- Two boatloads of emigrants leave the island of Raasay for Australia.
- Polled Herd Book established for Aberdeen Angus and Galloway cattle.
- Kirkcaldy High School established as Kirkcaldy Burgh School.
- The School of Arts of Edinburgh, predecessor of Heriot-Watt University, changes its name to the Watt Institution and School of Arts.
- George Hay Forbes founds Pitsligo Press.

== Births ==
- 24 May – R. B. Cunninghame Graham, radical socialist politician and writer (died 1936 in Argentina)
- 2 September – Durward Lely, opera singer and actor, (died 1944)
- 11 September – James Mackay, 1st Earl of Inchcape, businessman and colonial administrator in India (died 1932 in Monte Carlo)
- 2 October – William Ramsay, chemist, recipient of the Nobel Prize in Chemistry in 1904 (died 1916)
- John Kerr, businessman and politician
- Approximate date – Murdo Stewart MacDonald, merchant mariner (died 1938 in Mauritius)

== Deaths ==
- 5 May – William Henry Murray, actor-manager (born 1790 in England)
- 2 July – Thomas Thomson, chemist (born 1773)
- 22 July – John Smith, architect (born 1781)
- 25 July – Thomas Grainger, civil engineer and surveyor (born 1794)
- 4 September – William MacGillivray, naturalist (born 1796)

== See also ==
- Timeline of Scottish history
- 1852 in Ireland
