= 1861 in Scotland =

- Centuries: 17th; 18th; 19th; 20th; 21st
- Decades: 1840s; 1850s; 1860s; 1870s; 1880s
- See also: List of years in Scotland; Timeline of Scottish history 1861 in: The UK • Wales • Elsewhere

Events from the year 1861 in Scotland.

== Incumbents ==
=== Law officers ===
- Lord Advocate – James Moncreiff
- Solicitor General for Scotland – Edward Maitland

=== Judiciary ===
- Lord President of the Court of Session and Lord Justice General – Lord Colonsay
- Lord Justice Clerk – Lord Glenalmond

== Events ==
- 27 February – ironclad warship HMS Black Prince is launched from Robert Napier's yard at Govan on the River Clyde.
- 11 March – the Portpatrick Railway opens to Stranraer Town railway station, providing a connection from Dumfries.
- June – first modern excavation of the Neolithic chambered cairn and passage grave of Maeshowe on Orkney.
- 26 September – golfer Tom Morris, Sr. wins the second Open Championship.
- 23 October – foundation stone of the Royal Museum in Edinburgh laid by Prince Albert.
- 25 November – a tenement collapses in the Old Town, Edinburgh killing 35 with 15 survivors.
- Edinburgh Co-operative Building Company begin construction of Stockbridge Colonies, pioneering low-cost flats for artisans.
- One O'Clock Gun first fired from Edinburgh Castle.
- Edinburgh and Glasgow Bible Societies merged to form the National Bible Society of Scotland.
- White Horse whisky first produced by James Logan Mackie of Edinburgh.

== Births ==
- 11 April – Thomas Jaffrey, actuary (died 1953)
- 17 June – Robina Nicol, New Zealand photographer and suffragist (died 1942)
- 19 June – Douglas Haig, soldier and Field Marshal during World War I (died 1928)
- 9 July – William Burrell, shipowner and art collector (died 1958)
- 12 October – Agnes Jekyll, née Graham, artist, writer on domestic matters and philanthropist (died 1937 in England)
- 24 December – John Macdonald, sportsman and physician (died 1938)

== Deaths ==
- 8 April – John Bartholomew, Sr., cartographer (born 1805)
- 4 October – Archibald Montgomerie, 13th Earl of Eglinton (born 1812 in Sicily)
- 13 November – John Forbes, physician to Queen Victoria (1841–1861) (born 1787)

== See also ==
- Timeline of Scottish history
- 1861 in Ireland
