= 1713 in Scotland =

- Centuries: 16th; 17th; 18th; 19th; 20th
- Decades: 1690s; 1700s; 1710s; 1720s; 1730s
- See also: List of years in Scotland; Timeline of Scottish history 1713 in: Great Britain • Wales • Elsewhere

Events from the year 1713 in Scotland.

== Incumbents ==
- Secretary of State for Scotland: The Earl of Mar

=== Law officers ===
- Lord Advocate – Sir James Stewart
- Solicitor General for Scotland – Thomas Kennedy jointly with Sir James Steuart, Bt.

=== Judiciary ===
- Lord President of the Court of Session – Lord North Berwick
- Lord Justice General – Lord Ilay
- Lord Justice Clerk – Lord Grange

== Events ==
- December – the post of Regius Professor of Law at the University of Glasgow is established, considered as the foundation of the University of Glasgow School of Law.
- The main radial roads into Edinburgh are turnpiked.

== Births ==
- 25 May – John Stuart, 3rd Earl of Bute, Prime Minister of Great Britain (died 1792 in England)
- 13 October – Allan Ramsay, portrait painter (died 1784 in England)

== Deaths ==
- 20 October – Archibald Pitcairne, physician, classical scholar and satirist (born 1652)

== See also ==
- Timeline of Scottish history
