= William Howie Wylie =

William Howe Wylie (1833–1891) was a Scottish journalist and Baptist minister.

== Life ==
The son of William Wylie, a block calico printer of Kilmarnock, by his wife Agnes, daughter of John Howie of Lochgoin, he was born at Kilmarnock on 24 February 1833. He was educated there and on leaving school was employed in the office of the Kilmarnock Journal, and became local correspondent for the Glasgow North British Mail. In 1847–50 he was sub-editor of the Ayr Advertiser.

From Ayr, Wylie moved to Nottingham as editor of the ‘Nottingham Journal’ (1850–2). In 1852–3 he was sub-editor of the Liverpool Courier; a system of his of reporting verbatim speeches by turns was put to the test during the Liverpool election contest of 1852. In politics, he was a committed Liberal. In 1854–5 he was editor of the Falkirk Herald and sub-editor of the Glasgow Commonwealth. In 1855 Wylie moved on to Edinburgh, where he became sub-editor of the Daily Express, at the same time contributing to the War Telegraph, and attending the classes at the university with a view to the ministry.

In 1859, Wylie was president of the University Dialectic Society, and soon afterwards became a student at Regent's Park College, London, under Joseph Angus. In 1860, he was appointed Baptist minister of Ramsey, Huntingdonshire; and in 1865, he was transferred to Accrington in Lancashire, a charge he had to give up after a breakdown. He went to Gourock; but when his health improved he accepted the pastorate of a church at Blackpool. After another year's work, he had to give up preaching.

Wylie resumed the profession of journalist, from 1870 to 1877 he acted as sub-editor of the Christian World, at the same time writing the parliamentary letter for the North British Mail and the Greenock Telegraph, which he edited more or less from the start. The Telegraph was the first halfpenny evening paper in Britain, of which he was one of the original promoters, the proprietor being his brother-in-law, J. Pollock of Greenock.

In 1882 Wylie founded in Glasgow the Christian Leader, and was editor and proprietor of the paper till his death, at Troon, Ayrshire, on 5 August 1891. He was buried in St. Andrew's churchyard, Kilmarnock, where a monument was erected to his memory.

== Works ==
Wylie was the author of:

- Ayrshire Streams, Kilmarnock, 1851, reprinted from the ‘Ayr Advertiser’ of 1849–50).
- Old and New Nottingham, London, 1853.
- The Book of the Bunyan Festival, London, 1874.
- Thomas Carlyle: The Man and his Books, London, 1881.

While in London, Wylie also contributed to the Pall Mall Gazette, The Echo, and The Freeman, the Baptist periodical. For many years he also wrote for the North British Mail two columns of literary notes every Monday, and in 1879 a series of articles called The Castles and Mansions of the West.

== Family ==
On 11 February 1861 Wylie married Helen Young Pollock, youngest daughter of Robert Pollock of Greenock; she survived him with a daughter and a son, William Pollock Wylie, manager of the commercial department of the Christian Leader.

== Notes ==
Attribution

This article incorporates text from a publication now in the public domain: Lee, Sidney, ed. (1900). "Wylie, William Howie". Dictionary of National Biography. Vol. 63. London: Smith, Elder & Co.
