= John Ker (Latin poet) =

Scottish schoolteacher and academic

John Ker (died 1741) was a Scottish schoolteacher and academic, a classical scholar known as a Neo-Latin poet.

== Life ==
Ker was born at Dunblane, Perthshire, and was for a time schoolmaster at Crieff. About 1710, after examination by ministers and professors, he became a master in the Royal High School, Edinburgh. In 1717, he was appointed professor of Greek in King's College, Aberdeen, the first specialist teacher of the subject there, despite his admiration for the uncompromising Jacobite Archibald Pitcairne.

On 2 October 1734, Ker succeeded Adam Watt in the Latin chair at Edinburgh University. He studied law, and was a popular teacher, if (in the view of Alexander Carlyle) deferential to students from the nobility. He died at Edinburgh in November 1741.

== Works ==
About 1725, Ker published his Latin poem Donaides (those of the River Don), celebrating worthies of Aberdeen. In 1727, there appeared his paraphrase of the Song of Solomon, Cantici Solomonis Paraphrasis Gemina. He was also the author of memorial verses on Archibald Pitcairne, Sir William Scott of Thirlestane (1674?-1725), and others. He was included with other Scottish Latinists, in William Lauder's Poetarum Scotorum Musæ Sacræ, 1739. The Latin ballad on the battle of Killiecrankie versified in English by Sir Walter Scott and published in Chambers's Journal has been thought probably Ker's, since Robert Chambers.
