= Galloway Association of Glasgow =

The Galloway Association of Glasgow is a charitable trust that was formed on 22 August 1791, and was originally known as the Glasgow Galloway Brotherly Society. Its aims have always remained the same: to aid charitable, benevolent or educational purposes associated with Galloway and to encourage a love for and interest in Galloway. Membership is drawn from ex-Gallovidians, people who have relatives from Galloway or who have developed an interest and love of the ancient province.

== Origins ==
Glasgow Galloway Brotherly Association was a friendly society formed by a few Gallovidian men who had gone to Glasgow to find better opportunities. In the days long before welfare benefits, they put aside a few pennies to help the wives and children back in Galloway, who perhaps had fallen on hard times when the menfolk were off in Glasgow seeking their fortune. At the same time it enabled retention of a link with their heartland and a real purpose of providing some form of tangible benefit for those at home.

== Charitable work ==
The Association continues to consider requests for assistance each year, and selects those that are deemed to be appropriate to the aims and objectives of the Association. Grants may be approved by the Council of Management where they are considered to advance the future well-being of residents of Galloway but are not connected to the advancement of any business project. The Association supports projects for the arts, education, non-commercial groups and individuals.

Involvement in supplying grants for education has always been a key target area for the Association, providing financial support for young people pursuing a recognised course of further education at a university or college. Students are encouraged to find out what help might be available through their head teachers at secondary schools in Galloway.

== Social activities ==
The Association holds regular public meetings in Glasgow, primarily on subjects pertaining to Galloway such as the Planned Villages of Dumfries and Galloway, the Wigtown Book Town and the Railways of Galloway. Members are invited to Spring and Summer Outings, such as Threave Gardens, Castle Douglas and Loch Katrine. The social highlight of the year is the Anniversary Dinner, usually held in Gatehouse of Fleet, with a Galloway theme provided by guest speakers and entertainers.

== Galloway ==
Galloway lies at the south west tip of Scotland, facing the Irish Sea to the south and the North Channel to the west. Galloway refers to the former county of Wigtownshire and the Stewartry of Kirkcudbright.
