= William Russell (Scottish writer) =

Scottish historical and author

William Russell (1741–1793) was a Scottish historical and miscellaneous writer.

== Biography ==
Russell, the son of Alexander Russell, farmer, and his wife Christian Ballantyne, was born at the farm of Windydoors, Selkirkshire, in 1741. He was at school, first, at Innerleithen, Peeblesshire, and then for ten months in Edinburgh, where in 1756 he was apprenticed to a bookseller and printer.

When a journeyman Russell joined in 1763 the Miscellaneous Society, composed of university and other students. His friends revised a translation by him of Crebillon's Rhadamisthe and Zenobia, which he unsuccessfully submitted to Garrick for representation. He spent the autumn of 1765 with Patrick Murray, 5th Lord Elibank at his seat in Midlothian, and presently forsook his trade, trusting to prosper under Elibank's patronage.

After a short stay with his father, Russell proceeded to London in 1767 as a man of letters. For a time he was corrector of the press for Strahan, and in 1769 became printing overseer to Messrs. Brown & Adlard, but soon after 1770 appears to have lived exclusively by literary work. In 1780 he visited Jamaica to secure money as his brother's heir, and on his return prosecuted his literary calling in London with vigour and success.

In 1787 Russell married, and retired to Knottyholm, near Langholm, Dumfriesshire. In 1792 he received the honorary degree of LL.D. from St. Andrews University. He died suddenly of paralysis on 25 December 1793, and was buried in the churchyard of Westerkirk, Langholm. His widow, whose maiden name was Scott, and one daughter survived him.

== Bibliography ==
Russell achieved his chief reputation as an historian. The first of his works to meet with any success was The History of America, from the first Discovery by Columbus to the Conclusion of the late War, 1779.

In the same year Russell issued, anonymously, the first two volumes of his History of Modern Europe, in a Series of Letters from a Nobleman to his Son. Three further volumes, with the author's name, appeared in 1784, and the whole work was published in five volumes in 1786. It deals with the rise of the modern kingdoms of Europe down to the peace of Westphalia (1763). Before his death Russell planned a continuation to 1783, and Dr. Charles Coote, Rev. William Jones, and others carried the compilation forward to various stages in the nineteenth century. An epitome appeared in 1857. Russell summarises dexterously, knows and names his authorities, and occasionally advances an original opinion. It was superseded by the Modern Europe (1861–4) of Thomas Henry Dyer. Russell's History of Ancient Europe, with a View of the Revolutions in Asia and Africa (2 vols. 1793), was a fragment, and had indifferent success. Cadell arranged to pay him £750 for a History of England from the accession of George III to the end of the American war, but this was not begun.

Russell's other works, all creditable to the taste and judgement of a self-educated man, were:

1. Collection of Modern Poems, including pieces by Gray and Shenstone, 1756.
2. Ode to Fortitude, 1769.
3. Sentimental Tales, 1770.
4. Fables Moral and Sentimental, 1772.
5. Essay on the Character, Manners, and Genius of Women, 1772, from the French of M. Thomas.
6. Julia, a Poetical Romance, 1774, an ambitious failure.
7. Tragic Music, 1783, a spirited tribute to Mrs. Siddons.
