= Mary Mackellar =

Scottish poet (1834–1890)

Mary Mackellar (Scottish Gaelic: Màiri Nic Ceallair) (née Cameron, Scottish Gaelic: Camshròn) (1 October 1834 – 7 September 1890) was a prominent Highland Scottish poet, Scottish Gaelic-English translator and campaigner for a Gaelic language revival and the revival of Highland culture during the 19th century.

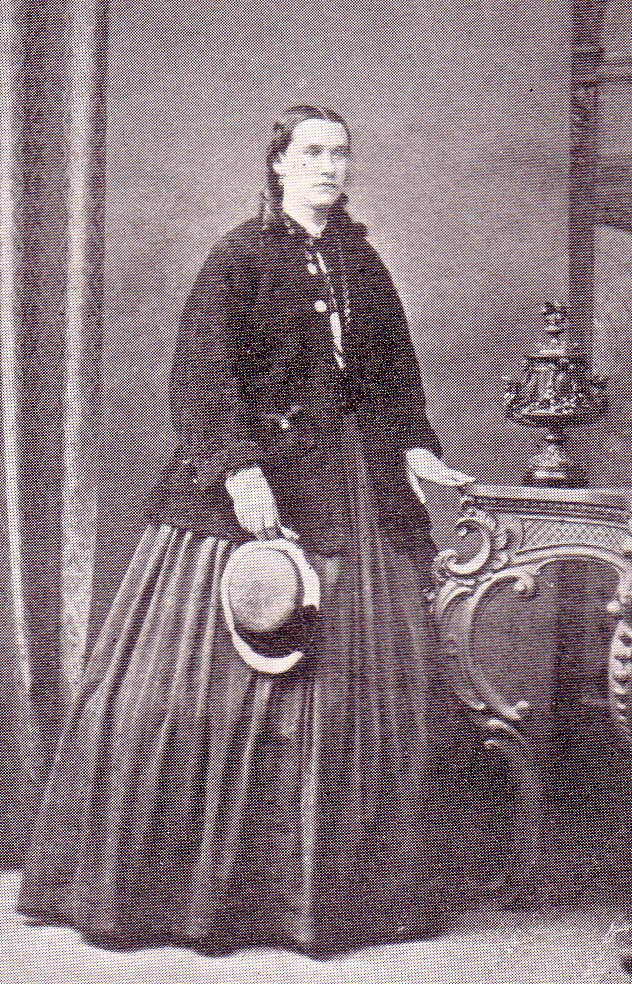
Mary MacKellar (Mairi nic Ceallair)

== Biography ==
Mary Mackellar, daughter of Allan Cameron, baker at Fort William, was born on 1 October 1834. Her early days were spent with grandparents at Corrybeg on the north shore of Loch Eil; her father died at a young age, and Mary briefly took over his business. She married early John Mackellar, captain and joint-owner of a coasting vessel, the "Glencoe", with whom she sailed for several years, visiting many places in Europe, and being often shipwrecked.

She settled in Edinburgh in 1876, shortly afterwards obtained a judicial separation from her husband, and dying on 7 September 1890, was buried at Kilmallie, Argyllshire. While living in Edinburgh she became friendly with Professor John Stuart Blackie and enthusiastically supported his successful campaign for the establishment of a Chair of Celtic Studies at Edinburgh University. She dedicated her book of poems and songs to her caraide dìleas agus fear-tagraidh mo dhùtcha, mo shluaigh agus mo chànain, Professor Blackie ("faithful friend and advocate of my country, my people and my language, Professor Blackie"). She translated a few of Blackie's poems into Gaelic.

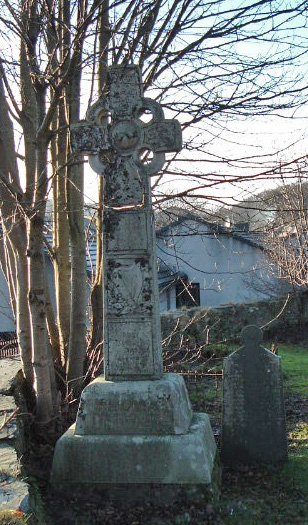
Mary MacKellar's grave stone and monument, Kilmallie Churchyard

For the last ten years of her life she tried to make a livelihood by her pen, and she was granted £60 from the Royal Bounty Fund in 1885. Her Poems and Songs, Gaelic and English, collected chiefly from newspapers and periodicals, were published at Edinburgh in 1880. According to the Dictionary of National Biography, the Gaelic poems show force and some fancy, but the English pieces, through which there is an undertone of sadness, are of no merit. She also wrote The Tourist's Handbook of Gaelic and English Phrases for the Highlands (Edinburgh, 1880), and her translation of Queen Victoria's second series of Leaves from our Journal in the Highlands has been described as "a masterpiece of forcible and idiomatic Gaelic". A Guide to Lochaber by her gives many traditions and historical incidents nowhere else recorded. She also wrote fiction, serialised in the Oban Times.

She held the office of 'bard' to the Gaelic Society of Inverness, in whose Transactions much of her prose, including her last work, appears; and was 'bard' of the Clan Cameron Society. The Highland Monthly, in its obituary, noted that Lochaber and Clan Cameron "formed the centre and soul of her work".

A monument was erected to her memory in Kilmallie by public subscription.

== Literary analysis ==
Norquay states that Mackellar was a well-traveled and prolific poet, prominent in her day, but whose over-sentimental and over-literate work did not have lasting impact. Macbain praises the force, accuracy and clearness of her use of Gaelic, and commends her fine intellect and breadth of knowledge, and sympathy for Highland history, lore and customs.

== Notes ==
This article incorporates text from a publication now in the public domain: Hadden, James Cuthbert (1893). "Mackellar, Mary". In Lee, Sidney (ed.). Dictionary of National Biography. Vol. 35. London: Smith, Elder & Co.
