= 1795 in Scotland =

- Centuries: 16th; 17th; 18th; 19th; 20th
- Decades: 1770s; 1780s; 1790s; 1800s; 1810s
- See also: List of years in Scotland; Timeline of Scottish history 1795 in: Great Britain • Wales • Elsewhere

Events from the year 1795 in Scotland.

== Incumbents ==
=== Law officers ===
- Lord Advocate – Robert Dundas of Arniston
- Solicitor General for Scotland – Robert Blair

=== Judiciary ===
- Lord President of the Court of Session – Lord Succoth
- Lord Justice General – The Duke of Montrose
- Lord Justice Clerk – Lord Braxfield

== Events ==
- 18 November – the River Clyde, in spate, floods the centre of Glasgow and brings down the recently erected bridge at the foot of the Saltmarket.
- Gallowgate Barracks in Glasgow are built.

== Births ==
- 12 March – William Lyon Mackenzie, journalist and politician in Canada (died 1861 in Canada)
- 25 May – George Meikle Kemp, designer of the (uncompleted) Scott Monument (died 1844)
- 19 June – James Braid, surgeon and scientist, pioneer of hypnotherapy (died 1860 in England)
- 6 September – Frances Wright, freethinker (died 1852 in the United States)
- 12 October – Janet Hamilton, née Thomson, poet and essayist (died 1873)
- 10 November – Walter Geikie, painter (died 1837)
- 4 December – Thomas Carlyle, historian, philosopher and essayist (died 1881 in England)
- 10 December – Sir George Burns, shipowner (died 1890)
- 21 December – Robert Moffat, missionary (died 1883)

== Deaths ==
- 22 February – Alexander Gerard, philosopher (born 1728)
- 19 May – James Boswell, diarist and biographer of Samuel Johnson (born 1740)
- 23 June – James Craig, architect, planner of the New Town, Edinburgh (born 1744)
- 24 June – William Smellie, encyclopedist and naturalist (born 1740)
- 10 December – John Johnstone, nabob with the East India Company and landowner (born 1734)

== The arts ==
- Archibald Constable starts in business for himself as a dealer in rare books in Edinburgh, origin of the publishing business which enters the 21st century as Constable & Robinson.

== Sport ==
- 17 January – Duddingston Curling Society formally organised.

== See also ==
- Timeline of Scottish history
- 1795 in Great Britain
