= Translations and Imitations from German Ballads by Sir Walter Scott =

Throughout Walter Scott's literary career, he imitated and translated poems from German sources. The resulting collection was gradually expanded over successive editions of Scott's poetry until it included seven items, which are introduced below.

Each ballad is a narrative poem retelling a popular German fairy-tale: including poignantly dramatic and tragic themes.

== William and Helen ==
William – long thought dead – unexpectedly returns at midnight from the crusades to marry his betrothed. Helen – relieved at his return – joyfully agrees, after initial misgivings: follows him on horseback on a wild gallop through the night. Approaching the church in which they will celebrate their wedding: it is clear to Helen that all is not what it seems. But, with their mutual love strong enough to transcend death itself – what can possibly go wrong?

== The Wild Huntsman ==
Sometimes referred to under its alternative title The Chase, this ballad describes the testing and judgment upon a profligate, noble-born keeper of the royal forest. The nobleman cruelly uses and mistreats his fellow-men: and is avidly addicted to the pleasures of hunting. One day God's messengers come to test him: executing sentence immediately in just proportion to the huntsman's responses.

== The Fire King ==
Count Albert never returns from crusade: having been imprisoned by Saracens. Rosalie, his betrothed, swears to leave at once for Lebanon to find him. Rosalie succeeds – but alas, all is changed between them forever: and their parting is death itself.

== Frederick and Alice ==
Frederick breaks troth and abandons the beautiful Alice: sending her mad with grief. But Alice contrives to meet her faithless lover once more: beyond the grave.

== The Battle of Sempach ==
This ballad translates an original written to celebrate the Swiss victory during the Battle of Sempach: by which the Swiss cantons established their independence.

== The Noble Moringer ==
This ballad describes the ordeal of the Baron of Märstetten: who departs upon a pilgrimage which lasts seven years. While sleeping, the Baron is shown in a vision that his faithful wife believes that he is dead, and is preparing to remarry. Interceding with Saint Thomas, he is transported back to Switzerland; where he reveals himself to his wife (after the manner of a modern Ulysses) and both are joyfully reunited.

== The Erl-King ==
The Erl-King (or Oak-King) sings for the soul of a human boy: who cringes for dear life within the arms of his father riding home through the dreary wood. But do spirits really have power to charm away the lives of the living?
