= James Small (inventor) =

James Small (1740, Dalkeith, Midlothian – 1793) was a Scottish inventor instrumental in the invention of the modern-style iron swing plough in 1779–80.

Born the son of a farmer at Upsettlington (now Ladykirk) he travelled to Doncaster in 1758, where he found work as an 'operative mechanic'. Returning to Scotland around 1764, Small was set up in business by wealthy farmer John Renton and began work on prototypes for a new design of plough. Although he never patented or made any money from his design - dying in poverty in 1793 - the invention revolutionised farming techniques in Britain and eventually spread to North America.
