= Robert Edmonstone =

Scottish artist

Robert Edmonstone RSA (1794–1834), was a Scottish artist.

== Life ==
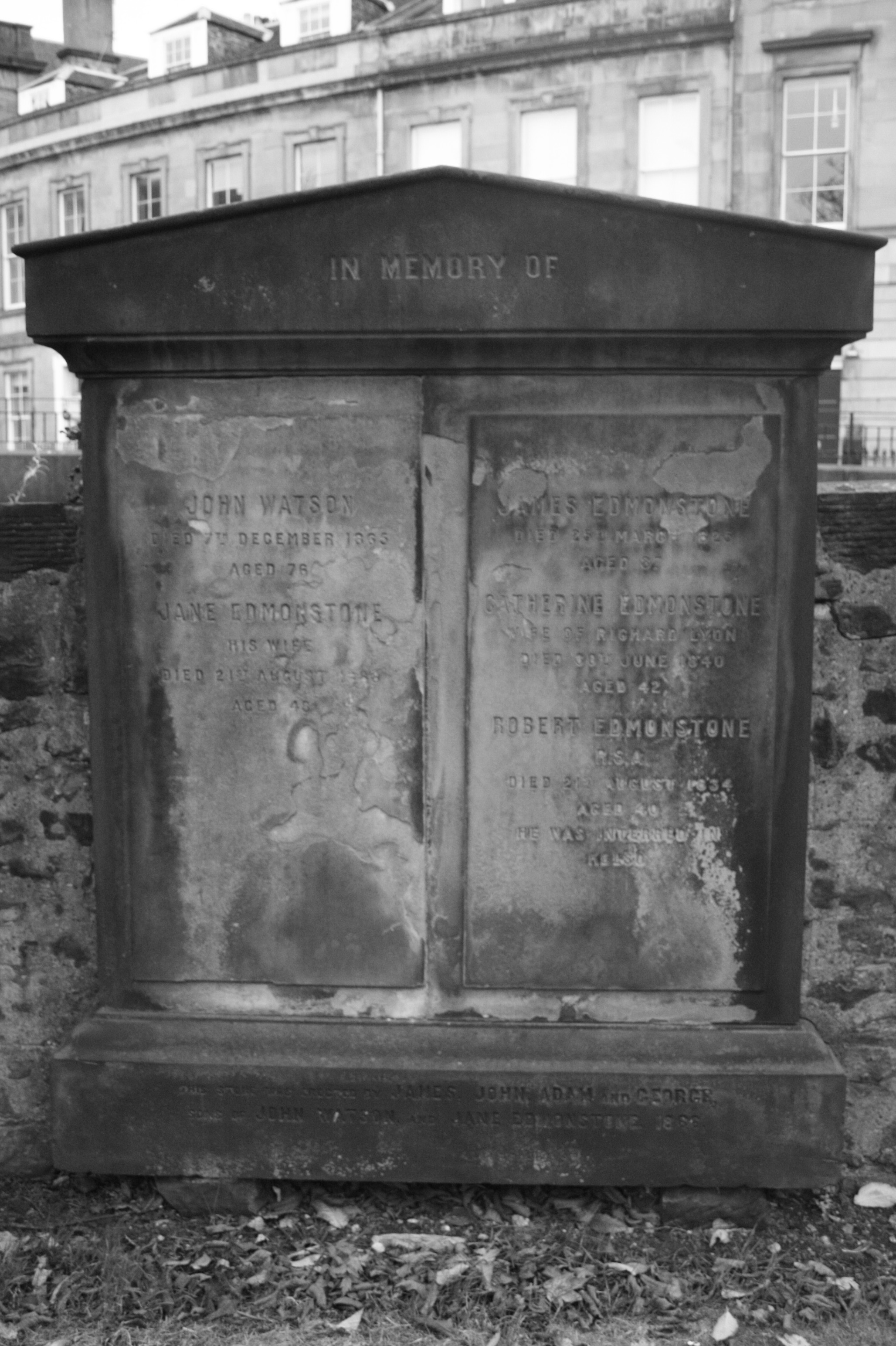
Robert Edmondstone's memorial, St Cuthbert's Edinburgh

Edmonstone, was born at Kelso in 1794, the son of James and Catherine Edmonstone. He was initially apprenticed to a watchmaker. He showed a taste for painting at an early age, and when his family came to Edinburgh, his drawings attracted much attention: he was patronised by Sir Abraham Hume, and settled in London about 1819. He first exhibited some portraits at the Royal Academy in 1818. After attending George Henry Harlow's studio he was admitted to the Royal Academy school, and subsequently travelled in Italy. Between 1824 and 1829 he was mainly painting portraits in London.

In 1830 Edmonstone exhibited Italian Boys playing at Cards. He paid a second visit to Italy in 1831–2, and painted Venetian Carriers and the Ceremony of Kissing the Chains of St. Peter, which was exhibited at the British Institution in 1833. Fifty-eight pictures by Edmonstone were in all exhibited at the Royal Academy, British Institution, and Suffolk Street Gallery exhibitions before 1834. A severe attack of fever at Rome in 1832, combined with overwork, permanently injured his health. He returned to London, and found himself so enfeebled that he went to Kelso, where he died on 21 August 1834. He is buried in Kelso but memorialised on the grave of his family in St Cuthbert's churchyard in central Edinburgh. The grave lies against the south-west boundary wall.

== Works ==
An engraving by James Mitchell (see Robert Mitchell) of his painting Robert Burns and his Highland Mary. was published in The Literary Souvenir annual for 1831, together with a poetical illustration by Letitia Elizabeth Landon.

Edmonstone's last pictures were The White Mouse, exhibited in 1834 at Suffolk Street, and the Children of Sir E. Cust, exhibited at the Royal Academy. He was a successful painter of children, and his portraits were popular; but he aspired to fame as a painter of imaginative subjects and as a student of Correggio.
