= Anne Forbes =

Scottish artist (1745–1834)

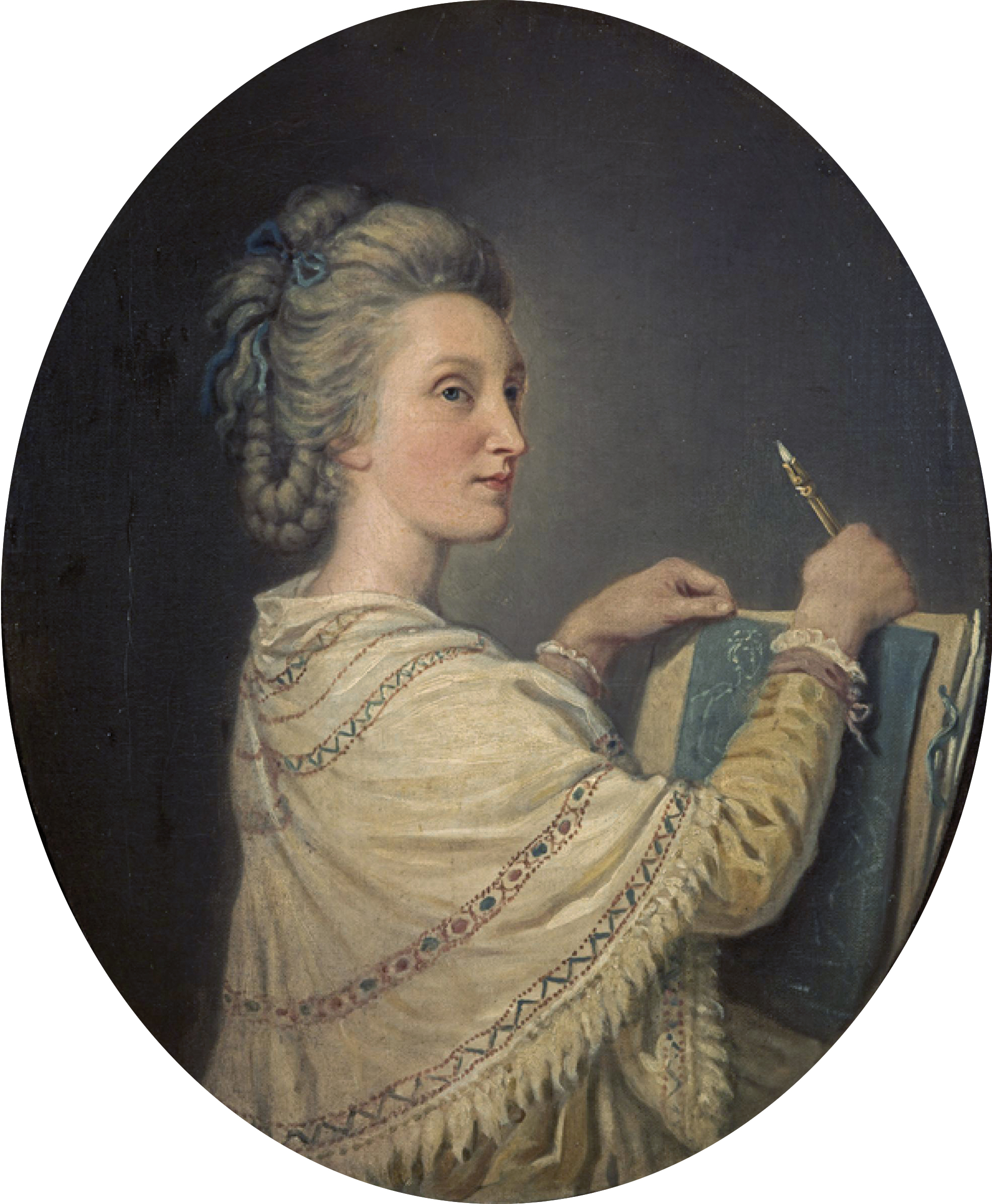
Anne Forbes (David Allan, 1781)

Anne Forbes (1745–1834) was a Scottish portrait painter educated in Rome. She worked in London until her time there was cut short by illness, and later in Edinburgh, where she was Portrait Painter to the Society of Antiquaries of Scotland. She was one of the first Scottish women artists to make a career from painting, and according to Colin Russell "her importance remains in her struggle against gender prejudice".

== Life ==
She was the granddaughter of the portraitist William Aikman, and was educated in Italy by the Scottish artists Gavin Hamilton and James Nevay, amongst others. Having underestimated the travel and living costs involved, she was obliged to secure the financial support of a small syndicate of interested friends. She returned to Britain, setting up business in London for a few years. However, her business was not a success, Forbes being unable to produce works fast enough to meet the requirements of her clients, and she fell ill, eventually returning to Scotland. In 1788 she was appointed Portrait Painter to the Society of Antiquaries in Edinburgh, and she was able to make a living, albeit not a rich one, from painting and teaching art. The Scottish National Portrait Gallery has a portrait of her by David Allan.

== Works ==
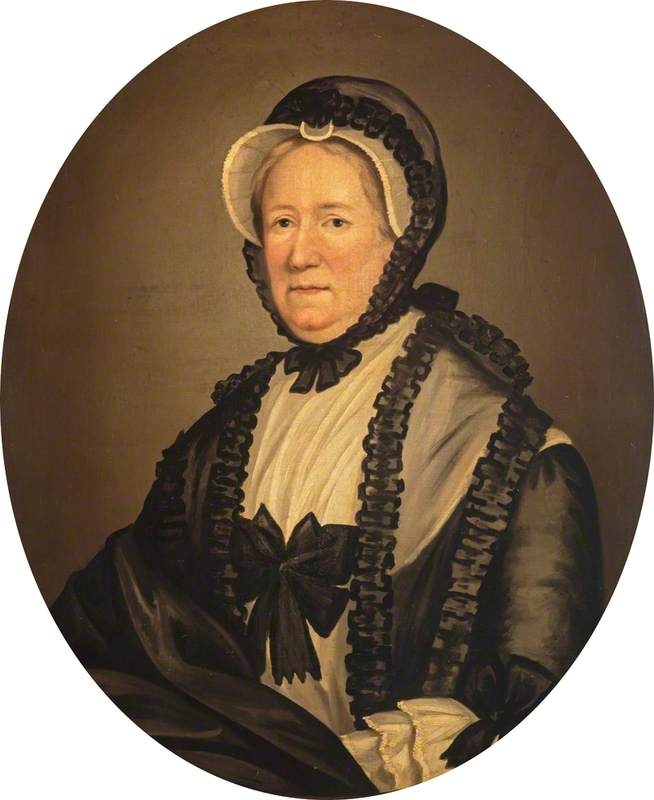
Anne Forbes, Lady Anne Stewart (1703 - 1783), 1774, National Galleries of Scotland

Her portrait of Lady Anne Stewart is in the collection of the National Galleries of Scotland. The National Portrait Gallery in London has a mezzotint after her portrait of Alexander Hume, Lord Polwarth. Paintings of Lady Elizabeth Penelope Crichton and Countess Margaret, wife of the 6th Earl of Dumfries are in Dumfries House, Cumnock, East Ayrshire.
