= Robert Craigie of Glendoick, Lord Craigie =

Scottish politician and judge

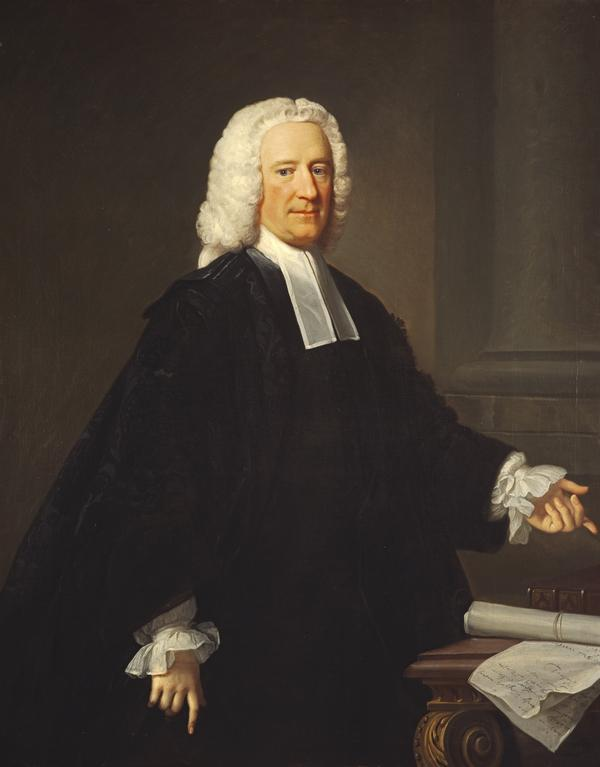
Robert Craigie, Lord Craigie. Lord Advocate, painting by Allan Ramsay, 1743.

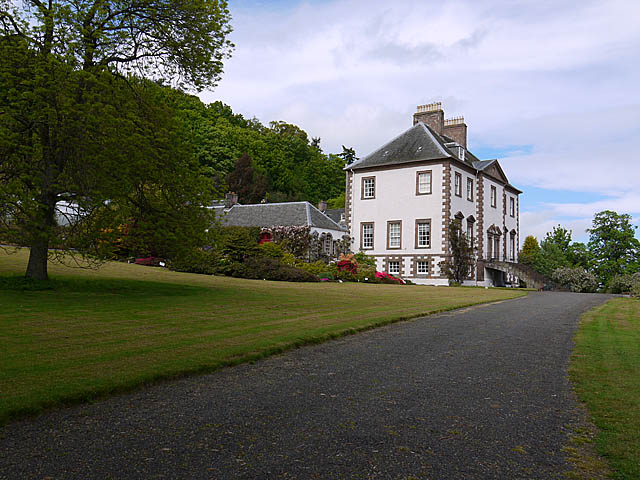
Glendoick House

Robert Craigie of Glendoick, Lord Craigie (1688–1760) was a Scottish politician and judge. He was baptised on 4 March 1688 and died on 10 March 1760.

On 2 April 1742 he was elected member of parliament for the Tain Burghs constituency in northern Scotland. He continued to represent this seat until the general election of 1747, when he did not seek re-election.

Admitted as an advocate in 1710, he was appointed Lord Advocate in 1742 and Lord President of the Court of Session in 1754. He took the judicial title of Lord Craigie and lived at Glendoick House to the east of Perth.

== Family ==
His great nephew was Robert Craigie, Lord Craigie.

Legal offices
Preceded by Charles Erskine	Lord Advocate; 1742–1746	Succeeded by William Grant
Preceded by Robert Dundas	Lord President of the Court of Session; 1754–1760	Succeeded by Robert Dundas
Parliament of Great Britain
Preceded by Charles Erskine	Member of Parliament for Tain Burghs; 1742–1747	Succeeded by Sir Harry Munro, Bt
