= Robert Dundas of Arniston, the younger =

Scottish judge (1713–1787)

The Much Honoured Lord Arniston FRSE
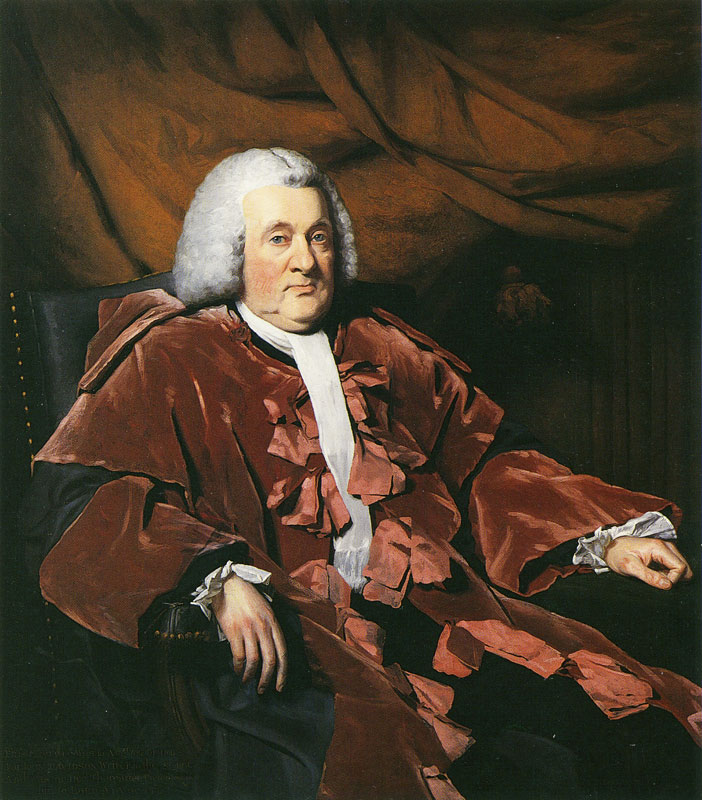
- Portrait of Dundas by Henry Raeburn

Lord President of the Court of Session Lord Justice General
- In office 30 April 1760 – 13 December 1787
- Appointed by: George III
- Preceded by: Robert Craigie
- Succeeded by: Thomas Miller

Member of Parliament for Midlothian
- In office 1754–1761
- Preceded by: Robert Balfour-Ramsay
- Succeeded by: Sir Alexander Gilmour

Lord Advocate
- In office 1754–1760
- Preceded by: William Grant
- Succeeded by: Thomas Miller

Solicitor General for Scotland
- In office 1742–1746
- Preceded by: William Grant
- Succeeded by: Patrick Haldane

Personal details
- Born: 18 July 1713
- Died: 13 December 1787 (aged 74) Adam's Square, Edinburgh
- Resting place: Borthwick
- Party: Whig
- Spouses: Henrietta Baillie (m. 1741; died 1755) Jean Grant (m. 1756)
- Children: 8, including Robert, Francis, William, Philip
- Parent(s): Robert Dundas of Arniston; Elizabeth Watson
- Education: University of Edinburgh; Utrecht University
- Profession: Advocate, Judge, Politician

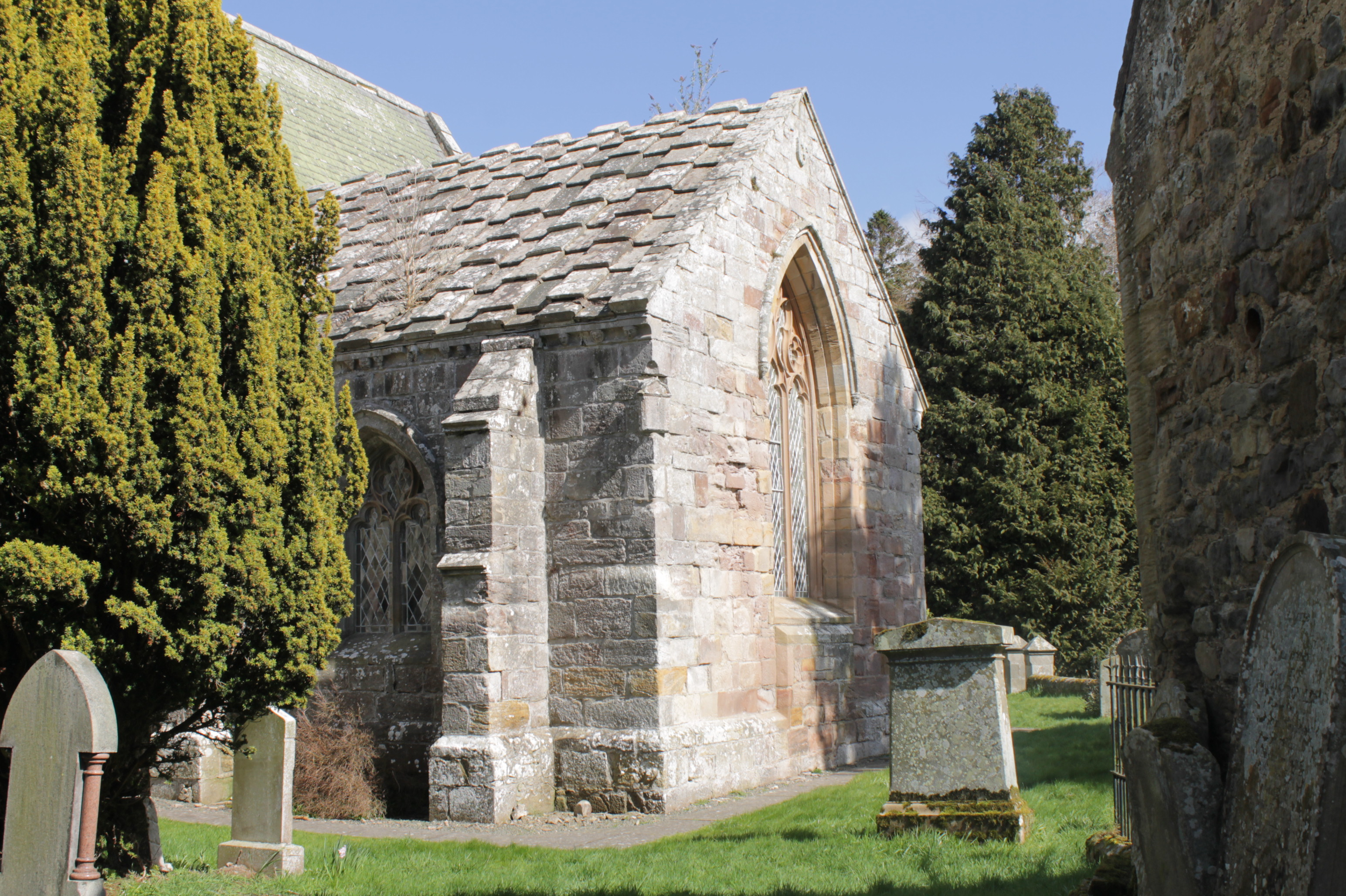
Arniston Aisle, Borthwick Parish Church

Robert Dundas of Arniston, the younger, FRSE (18 July 1713 – 13 December 1787) was a Scottish judge. He served as Solicitor General for Scotland from 1742 to 1746, as Lord Advocate from 1754 to 1760, and as Member of Parliament for Midlothian from 1754 to 1761. He was Lord President of the Court of Session from 1760 to 1787, losing his popularity for giving his casting vote against Archibald Douglas in the famous Douglas Cause.

== Life and career ==
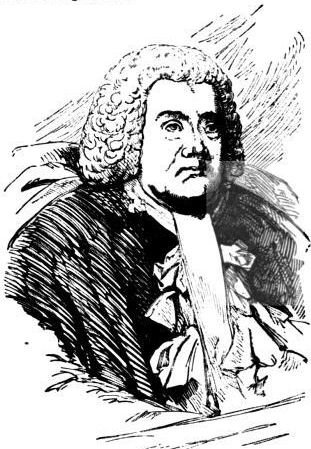
Robert Dundas of Arniston, the younger

Robert Dundas was the eldest son of Robert Dundas of Arniston (1685–1753), Lord President of the Court of Session, by Elizabeth Watson, his first wife. He was educated first at home and at school, and then at the University of Edinburgh. In 1733, he proceeded to Utrecht University, then celebrated for the teaching of Roman law, and also visited Paris.

Returning to Scotland in 1737, Dundas was admitted an advocate in 1738. He was quick, ingenious and eloquent, and had a retentive memory. Like his father, he was convivial and shirked drudgery. He is said, though a good scholar, never to have read through a book after leaving college. Being solely ambitious of attaining to the bench, he refused many cases, especially those which involved writing papers, and took only such work as seemed to lead to advancement. For his first five years, his fees only averaged £280 per annum. Through the favour of the Carteret administration, he was appointed Solicitor General for Scotland on 11 August 1742, and, no change occurring in the Scotch department on Lord Wilmington's death, held that post through the arduous and responsible times of the Jacobite plots and the rising of 1745. Being, however, unable to act easily with Lord Milton, the lord justice clerk, he resigned in 1746 upon the change of ministry, but was at once elected dean of the faculty.

On 16 August 1754, Dundas was appointed Lord Advocate, having been returned for Midlothian unopposed on 25 April at the general election. While in parliament, he opposed the establishment of a militia in Scotland, and, as lord advocate, was largely occupied in settling the new conditions of the highlands, and in disposing of his great patronage so as to enhance the family influence. But one speech of his in parliament is recorded,

"Dundas was appointed a commissioner of fisheries on 17 June 1755, and on the death of Robert Craigie, he became lord president of the court of session, 14 June 1760. He found upwards of two years' arrears of cases undecided, and having by great efforts disposed of them, he never allowed his case-list to fall into arrears again. He was the best lord president who had filled the office, short but weighty in his judgements, thorough in his grasp of the cases, indignant at chicane, a punctilious guardian of the dignity of the court, a chief who called forth all the faculties of his colleagues".

Having, on 7 July 1767, given the casting vote against the claimant, Archibald Stewart, in the Douglas peerage case, he became very unpopular, and during the tumultuous rejoicings at Edinburgh, after the House of Lords had reversed that decision on 2 March 1769, the mob insulted him and attacked his house. In his latter years his eyesight failed, and after a short illness he died at his house in Adam's Square on 13 December 1787, and was buried with great pomp at Borthwick on 18 December His tomb lis within Borthwick Church in the Arniston Aisle and was sculpted by John Bacon of London.

== Family ==
"Part of a remarkable Scottish legal and political dynasty, his great-grandfather James Dundas, Lord Arniston (died 1679) and grandfather Robert Dundas, Lord Arniston (died 1726) had been MPs and judges, as was his father, Robert Dundas of Arniston, the Elder".

Dundas married, firstly, on 17 October 1741, Henrietta Baillie, daughter of Sir James Carmichael Baillie of Lamington and Bonnytoun, who died on 3 May 1755; and, secondly, in September 1756, Jean, daughter of William Grant, Lord Prestongrange. By his first wife, he had four daughters, of whom Elizabeth, the eldest, married Sir John Lockhart-Ross, 6th Baronet; and by his second four sons, of whom Robert, the eldest, became lord advocate, and two daughters. The three younger sons all had notable careers: Francis became a general and acting governor of the Cape Colony between 1798 and 1803, William became a lawyer and Member of Parliament, and Philip became superintendent of Bombay, a Member of Parliament, and governor of Prince of Wales Island.

== Notes ==
Parliament of the United Kingdom
Preceded by Robert Balfour-Ramsay	Member of Parliament for Midlothian; 1754 – 1761	Succeeded by Sir Alexander Gilmour
Legal offices
Preceded by William Grant	Solicitor General for Scotland; 1742–1746	Succeeded by Patrick Haldane; Alexander Hume
Preceded by William Grant	Lord Advocate; 1754–1760	Succeeded by Thomas Miller
Preceded by Robert Craigie	Lord President of the Court of Session; 1760–1787	Succeeded by Thomas Miller
