= Robert Dundas of Arniston, the Elder =

Scottish judge (1685–1753)

The Right Honourable Robert Dundas

Lord President of the Court of Session
- In office 1748–1753
- Preceded by: Duncan Forbes, 5th of Culloden
- Succeeded by: Robert Craigie, Lord Glendoick

Lord Advocate
- In office 1720–1725
- Preceded by: Sir David Dalrymple
- Succeeded by: Duncan Forbes, 5th of Culloden

Solicitor General for Scotland
- In office 1717–1720
- Preceded by: Sir James Stewart
- Succeeded by: Walter Stewart

Member of Parliament for Edinburghshire
- In office 1722–1737
- Constituency: Edinburghshire

Personal details
- Born: 9 December 1685 Scotland
- Died: 26 August 1753 (aged 67) Edinburgh, Scotland
- Spouse(s): Elizabeth Watson; Anne Gordon
- Children: Robert Dundas of Arniston, the younger Henry Dundas, 1st Viscount Melville
- Parent(s): Robert Dundas, Lord Arniston; Margaret Sinclair

Robert Dundas of Arniston, the elder, 2nd Lord Arniston (1685–1753) was a Scottish lawyer, and Tory politician who sat in the House of Commons from 1722 to 1737. In 1728 he reintroduced into Scottish juries the possible verdicts of guilty or not guilty as against proven or not proven. He was Lord President of the Court of Session from 1748 to 1753.

== Early life ==
Dundas was born on 9 December 1685, the second son of Robert Dundas, Lord Arniston, a judge of the court of session, and his wife Margaret Sinclair, daughter of Sir Robert Sinclair of Stevenson. The family's Edinburgh house was at the head of Old Fishmarket Close on the Royal Mile. The house was later destroyed in the Great Fire of Edinburgh.

He was educated at Utrecht in about 1700 and was admitted a member of the Faculty of Advocates on 26 July 1709, and became a profound lawyer through his Interest and talent.

== Career ==
Arniston House south of Edinburgh

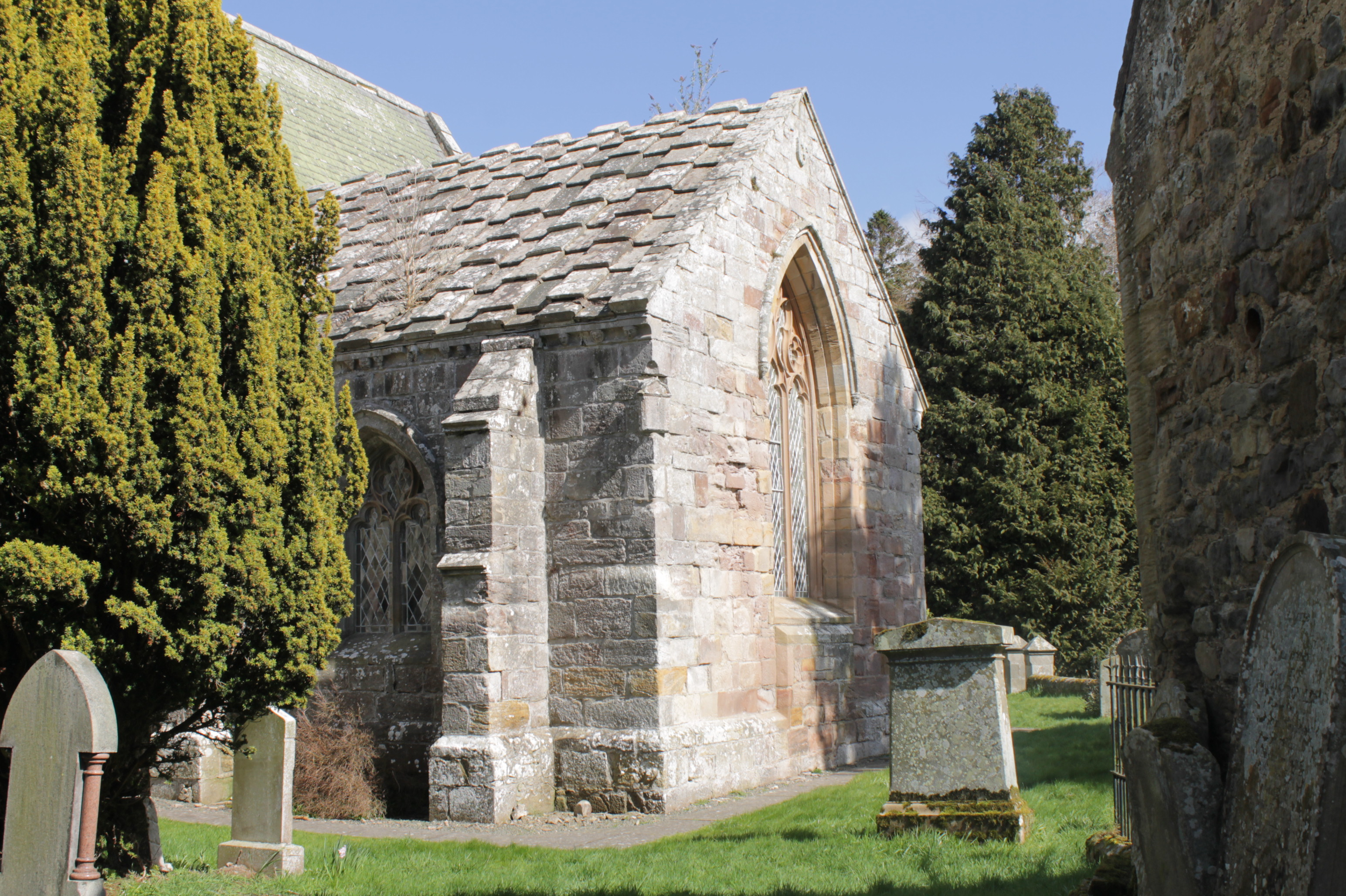
Arniston Aisle, Borthwick Parish Church

In about 1717 Dundas was appointed Assessor to city of Edinburgh and was also appointed in 1717 Solicitor General for Scotland by the secretary of state, the Duke of Roxburghe, the head of the Squadrone. He found this an irksome position, and in 1718 applied to succeed Eliot of Minto on the bench, but the place was already given to Sir Walter Pringle. However, he was promoted in 1720 by the Duke of Roxburghe to be Lord Advocate, in succession to Sir David Dalrymple . On 9 December 1721 he became dean of the Faculty of Advocates. On 11 July 1721 he resigned the post of assessor to the city of Edinburgh and an acrimonious correspondence took place between him and the magistrates of Edinburgh.

At the 1722 British general election Dundas was returned as Member of Parliament for Edinburghshire. He was a major opponent of the malt-tax in 1724, after the Argyll party came into power with Robert Walpole. He was counsel for the Glasgow magistrates after they were charged with conniving at the riots against the tax. He became a key figure in agitation against the tax and also encouraged the Edinburgh brewers to resist. In the Commons, on 4 March 1726, he blamed the riots on the mismanagement of the Government and the military authorities. Later he put forward a proposal to allocate part of the malt tax to improvements in Scotland. In 1727 he proposed a counter-address against the malt tax instead of a loyal address of the court of session.

In 1726 he commissioned William Adam to design Arniston House, a few miles south of Edinburgh and this became his family home.

At the 1727 British general election Dundas was returned unopposed as MP for Edinburghshire and continued in opposition. He spoke against the Government in the Dunkirk debate on 12 February 1730 and also in 1730 promoted a bill to give the court of session the power of adjourning. After his return unopposed at the 1734 British general election, he was the chief adviser of the opposition formed of representative peers and members of parliament against the administration of Scotch affairs adopted by Lord Ilay. With Erskine of Grange, he joined with the opposition in an attack in both Houses on the methods which the Government had used in the recent election of Scottish representative peers. This opposition movement was, however, unsuccessful. On 5 May 1735 the Commons passed a bill drafted by Erskine and introduced by Dundas to prevent the wrongful imprisonment of persons coming to vote in elections, but the bill was thrown out by the House of Lords. On 10 June 1737, Dundas was appointed a judge of the court of session, in succession to Sir Walter Pringle of Newhall, and vacated his seat in the House of Commons.

In 1745, Dundas' son Robert dissuaded his father from retiring into private life, but it was believed, he would have retired in 1748 if his hopes of becoming lord president had been disappointed. After a vacancy of nine months, the ministry and independent Whigs, overrode the Duke of Argyll's opposition, and on 10 September 1748 Dundas succeeded Duncan Forbes, 5th of Culloden, as lord president, and filled the office for the rest of his life.

His main Edinburgh address was a mansion on Fishmarket Close, off the Royal Mile which had formerly been the house of George Heriot (destroyed in the Great Fire of Edinburgh in 1824).

Dundas dies at Abbey Hill, Edinburgh, on 26 August 1753. He was buried on 31 August in the family tomb in the Arniston aisle of Borthwick Parish Church.

== Most famous case ==
Dunas's most famous case was his defence of James Carnegie of Finhaven in 1728 on his trial for the murder of Charles, earl of Strathmore, whom he killed in after being assaulted by John Lyon of Bridgeton. Finhaven, mortaly drunk stumbled after Bridgeton, sword drawn, the 6th Earl stood in the way to break it up and Finhaven accidentally ran him through. The original practice was to allow the jury to find the prisoner generally guilty or not guilty; about the time of Charles II this was altered to a finding upon the facts of proven or not proven. In this case it was clear that Carnegie killed Strathmore. If the jury were to find the fact proven, leaving the court to pronounce the legal effect of that finding, Carnegie was a dead man. Dundas forced the court to return to the older course, and the jury found Carnegie not guilty, and this practice was adopted in subsequent cases.

== Assessment ==
As an advocate he was both eloquent and ingenious; in private life idle and convivial. Dundas's appearance was forbidding and his voice harsh; his portrait is preserved at Arniston, and is engraved in the Arniston Memoirs.

== Family ==
Dundas married, twice. In 1712, Elizabeth, eldest daughter of Robert Watson of Muirhouse, who, with four of his children, died in January 1734 of smallpox, and by her he had a son, Robert, afterwards lord president, and other children.

On 3 June 1734, he married Anne, daughter of Sir William Gordon, bart., of Invergordon, by whom he had five sons and a daughter. One of these sons, Henry, was Treasurer of the Navy and 1st Viscount Melville, whereas one of his daughters was the wife to Adam Duncan, 1st Viscount Duncan.

== Notes ==
Parliament of Great Britain
Preceded by John Baird	Member of Parliament for Edinburghshire; 1722,–1737	Succeeded by Sir Charles Gilmour
Legal offices
Preceded by Sir James Stewart, Bt.	Solicitor General for Scotland; 1717–1720	Succeeded by Walter Stewart
Preceded by Sir David Dalrymple	Lord Advocate; 1720–1725	Succeeded by Duncan Forbes
Preceded by Duncan Forbes	Lord President; 1748–1753/4	Succeeded by Robert Craigie
Academic offices
Preceded by Mungo Graham of Gorthie	Rector of the University of Glasgow; 1720–1723	Succeeded by James Hamilton of Aikenhead
