= William Grant, Lord Prestongrange =

Scottish politician and judge

William Grant
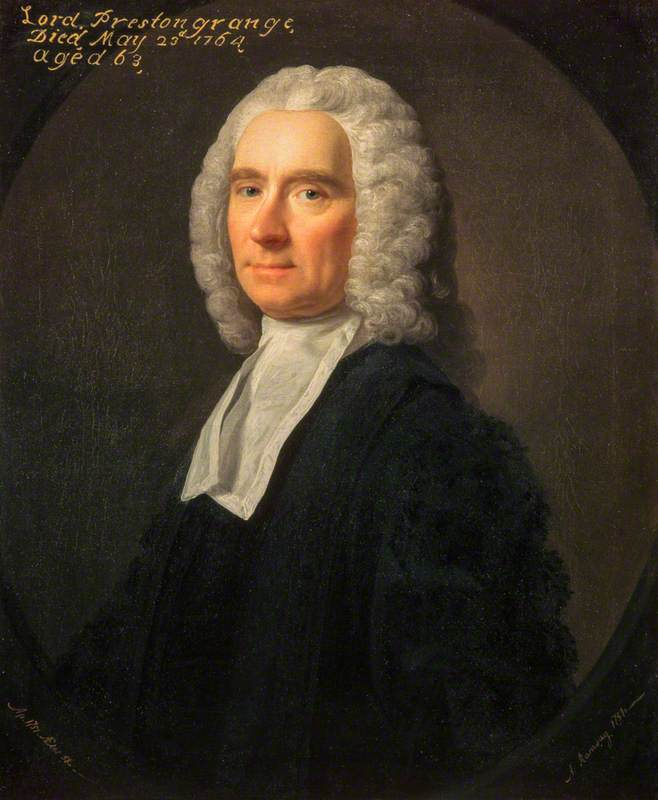
- Grant by Allan Ramsay, 1751

Lord Advocate
- In office 1746–1754
- Preceded by: Robert Craigie
- Succeeded by: Robert Dundas

Solicitor General for Scotland
- In office 1737–1742
- Preceded by: Duncan Forbes
- Succeeded by: Robert Craigie

Personal details
- Born: 1701
- Died: 23 May 1764 (aged 62–63) Bath, England, Great Britain
- Spouse: Grizel
- Children: Janet, Agnes, Jean, and Christian
- Parent(s): Francis Grant; Jean Meldrum

William Grant, Lord Prestongrange (1701 – 23 May 1764), was a Scottish politician and judge.

Grant was procurator for the Church of Scotland and Clerk to the General Assembly in 1731. He campaigned against patronage in the Church. He was appointed Solicitor General for Scotland in 1737 and promoted to Lord Advocate in 1746. He was Member of Parliament for Elgin Burghs from 1747 to 1754, and carried bills for the abolition of heritable jurisdictions, wardholding and for annexation of forfeited estates to the Crown. He was appointed a Lord of Session and Justiciary as Lord Prestongrange in 1754, and a Commissioner of annexed estates in 1755.

== Biography ==
William Grant was the second surviving son of Sir Francis Grant by his first wife, Jean Meldrum, daughter of the Rev. William Meldrum of Meldrum, Aberdeenshire. He was admitted an advocate on 24 February 1722, and on 13 May 1731 was appointed Procurator to the General Assembly of the Church of Scotland, and Principal Clerk to the General Assembly.

In 1736, Grant wrote a pamphlet Remarks on the State of the Church of Scotland with respect to Patronages, and with reference to a Bill now depending before Parliament, On 20 June 1737 he succeeded Charles Erskine of Tinwald as Solicitor General, and on 28 August in the following year was constituted one of the commissioners for improving the fisheries and manufactures of Scotland. Upon the retirement of Robert Craigie, Grant was appointed Lord Advocate on 26 February 1746, and on 20 May following the assembly held that the lord advocate could not act as procurator and clerk, and that consequently these offices were vacated.

At a by-election in February 1747, Grant was returned to parliament as member for the Elgin Burghs, and on 1 April 1747 was "added to the gentlemen who are appointed to prepare and bring in a bill for taking away and abolishing the heretable jurisdictions in … Scotland". Grant took part in the debate on the second reading of the bill, and is said by Horace Walpole to have spoken "excessively well for it". This important measure of Scottish reform was subsequently carried through both houses and passed, as well as another bill, which had been introduced by the lord advocate and the English law officers, for the abolition of ward holding.

At the general election in July 1747 Grant was again returned for the Elgin burghs, and in April 1749 supported the grant to the city of Glasgow for the losses sustained during the rebellion in a vigorous speech. On 24 February 1752 he introduced a bill for annexing the forfeited estates in Scotland to the crown inalienably, which after some opposition became law.

He was for the third time returned for the Elgin burghs at the general election in May 1754, but vacated his seat on his appointment as an ordinary lord of session and a Lord of Justiciary in the place of Patrick Grant, Lord Elchies. He took his seat on the bench on 14 November 1754, and assumed the title of Lord Prestongrange. In the following year he was appointed one of the commissioners for the annexed estates. Grant died at Bath on 23 May 1764, aged 62 or 63, and was buried on 7 June following in the aisle of Prestonpans Church, Haddingtonshire, where a monument in the churchyard was erected to his memory.

== Works ==
Grant is said to have written The occasional Writer, containing an Answer to the second Manifesto of the Pretender's eldest Son, which bears date at the Palace of Holyrood House, 10 October 1745; containing Reflections, political and historical, upon the last Revolution, and the Progress of the present Rebellion in Scotland,' London, 1745, 8vo.

The authorship of this pamphlet has, however, also been ascribed to Thomas Hollis.

== Assessment ==
Tytler speaks highly of his integrity, candour, and "winning gentleness", and says that his "conduct in the adjustment of the claims on the forfeited estates merited universal approbation". With the exception of the proceedings at the trial of James Stewart in May 1752 (where as Lord Advocate he was chief prosecutor), Grant's conduct as public prosecutor was both fair and moderate.

== Family ==
Grant married Grizel (died 1792), daughter of the Rev. – Millar. They had four daughters:

- Janet, who married John, 4th Earl of Hyndford;
- Agnes, who married Sir George Suttie, Baronet, of Balgone;
- Jean, who married Robert Dundas of Arniston, the younger, the second lord president of that name; and
- Christian, who died unmarried in 1761.

On the death of Janet, Countess of Hyndford in 1818, her nephew, Sir James Suttie, succeeded to the Preston-Grange estate (purchased by Grant in 1746), and assumed the additional surname of Grant.

== Culture ==
Grant was the chief prosecutor of "James of the Glen" Stewart for aiding and abetting "The Appin Murder" – the May 1752 ambush and murder of Colin "The Red Fox" Campbell. This incident is described in Robert Louis Stevenson's novel Catriona where he appears as Lord Prestongrange.

== Ancestry ==
Ancestors of William Grant, Lord Prestongrange

Archibald Grant
Francis Grant
William Grant
William Meldrum
Jean Meldrum

== Notes ==
Parliament of Great Britain
Preceded by Sir James Grant, Bt	Member of the British House of Commons for Elgin Burghs; 1747–1755	Succeeded by Sir Andrew Mitchell
Legal offices
Preceded by Charles Erskine	Solicitor General for Scotland; 1737–1742	Succeeded by Robert Dundas
Preceded by Robert Craigie	Lord Advocate; 1746–1754	Succeeded by Robert Dundas
