= Archibald Campbell, 3rd Duke of Argyll =

British army officer, judge, politician and merchant (1682–1761)

His Grace The Duke of Argyll PC
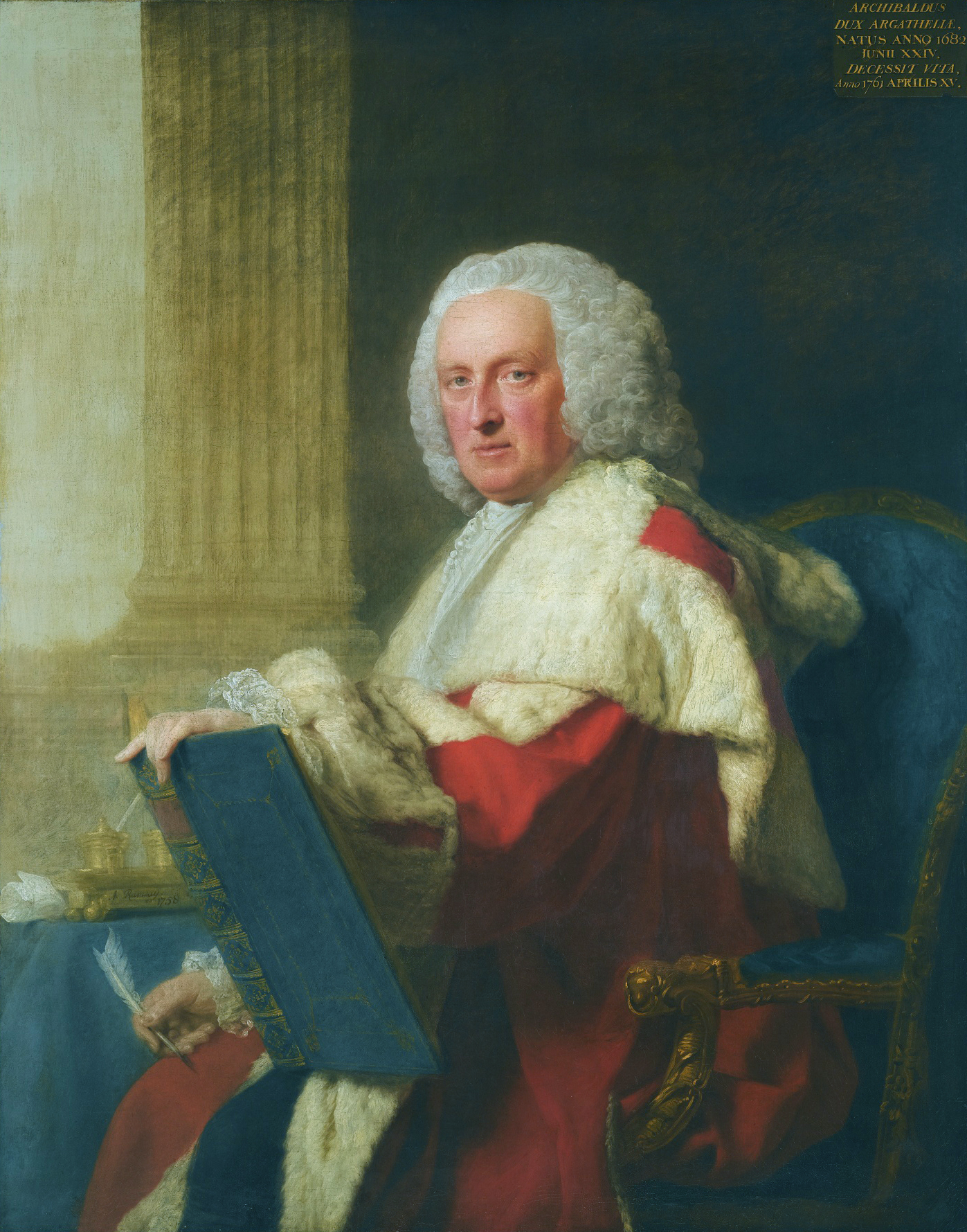

Lord Keeper of the Great Seal of Scotland
- In office 1733–1761
- Monarchs: George II; George III
- Preceded by: The Duke of Montrose
- Succeeded by: The Duke of Queensberry

Personal details
- Born: June 1682 Ham House, Surrey, England
- Died: 15 April 1761 (aged 79) London, England
- Resting place: Kilmun, Argyll
- Spouse: Anne Whitfield (died 1723)
- Education: Eton College
- Alma mater: University of Glasgow

Archibald Campbell, 3rd Duke of Argyll, PC (June 1682 – 15 April 1761) was a British army officer, judge, politician and merchant. He was styled Lord Archibald Campbell from 1703 to 1706, and as the Earl of Ilay from 1706 until 1743, when he succeeded to the dukedom. Campbell was the dominant political leader in Scotland for his time, and was involved in many civic projects.

== Early life and career ==
Born at Ham House, Petersham, Surrey, he was the second son of Archibald Campbell, 10th Earl and 1st Duke of Argyll (1658–1703) and his wife Elizabeth, eldest daughter of Sir Lionel Tollemache, 3rd Baronet of Helmingham, Suffolk. He was the first cousin once removed of Lord William Campbell.

He was educated at Eton College in 1698 and later at the University of Glasgow and Utrecht University, where he studied civil law. On his father being created a Duke in 1703 he joined the army, and served for a short time under the Duke of Marlborough. He was appointed Lord High Treasurer of Scotland by Queen Anne in 1705.

He supported his brother, John Campbell, 2nd Duke of Argyll (on many topics, most notably the Act of Union), earning him the title of Earl of Ilay in 1706. Following the treaty of union he was elected as one of the sixteen Scottish peers to sit in the House of Lords.

His military career, which was less successful than his brother's, was somewhat distinguished. He obtained the colonelcy of the newly formed 36th Regiment of Foot in 1709 (until 1710). In the Jacobite rising of 1715, he raised forces for the Government in Argyll and assisted his brother at the 1715 Battle of Sheriffmuir.

A keen supporter of agricultural improvement, in 1729 he created an experimental farm on former barren moorland, appropriately calling it "Whim". This is located off the A701 around 3km south of Penicuik. The farmhouse was built in 1731 by William Annan, a mason from Crail, with design being supervised if not actually created by William Adam. Ornate plasterwork by Samuel Calderwood of Edinburgh was completed in April 1734. In 1761 a library was added, designed by John Adam son of William.

== Political power ==
In 1711 he was appointed to the Privy Council. Many called him the "most powerful man in Scotland", at least until the era of Henry Dundas. Prime Minister Robert Walpole gave Campbell control over the royal patronage in Scotland. That became his base of power; he used it to control the votes of the other Scottish peers in the election of 16 representative peers to the British Parliament in London. He was appointed Keeper of the Privy Seal of Scotland in 1721, and was afterwards entrusted with the principal management of Scottish affairs. In 1733 he was made Keeper of the Great Seal of Scotland, an office which he held until his death.

Lord Ilay played a critical role in establishing The Faculty of Medicine at the University of Edinburgh in 1726.

He was one of the founders of the Royal Bank of Scotland in 1727, and acted as the bank's first governor. His portrait has appeared on the front of all Royal Bank of Scotland banknotes, and as a watermark on the notes, since they were redesigned in 1987. The portrait is based on a painting by Allan Ramsay, in the Scottish National Portrait Gallery.

He was also one of the founders of the British Linen Company, founded in 1746. He acted as the company's first Governor until his death in 1761 and held an instrumental role in the promotion of the Linen manufacture in Scotland.

== Duke of Argyll ==
He succeeded his brother to the title of Duke of Argyll in October 1743. During the Jacobite rising of 1745 he was an important pro-government political figure in Western Scotland and used his clan power, militia forces, and administrative authority to organise government forces against the Jacobites.

He worked on Inveraray Castle, his brother's estate, which was finished in the 1750s; however, he never lived in it, and he died in 1761. He is buried at Kilmun Parish Church.

He was married to Anne Whitfield about 1712, but had no legitimate male issue at his death. In his will, he left his English property to his mistress Ann (née Shireburn) Williams. His titles passed to his cousin, John Campbell, 4th Duke of Argyll, the son of his father's brother John Campbell of Mamore.

The Duke established an estate at Whitton Park, Whitton in Middlesex in 1722 on land that had been enclosed some years earlier from Hounslow Heath. The Duke was an enthusiastic gardener and he imported large numbers of exotic species of plants and trees for his estate. He was nicknamed the "Treemonger" by Horace Walpole. On his death, many of these, including mature trees, were moved by his nephew, John Stuart, 3rd Earl of Bute, to the Princess of Wales' new garden at Kew. This later became Kew Gardens and some of the Duke's trees are still to be seen there to this day. The Duke of Argyll's Tea Tree is an imported shrub named after him which has become established in hedgerows in some parts of England.

== In literature ==
In Neil Munro's novel Doom Castle (1901), Archibald Campbell features as the 3rd Duke of Argyll and returns in The New Road (1914) as the Earl of Ilay.

== See also ==
- People on Scottish banknotes

== Notes ==
Legal offices
Preceded by The Earl of Cromartie	Lord Justice General; 1710–1761	Succeeded by The Marquess of Tweeddale
Political offices
Preceded by The Earl of Glasgow	Lord Clerk Register; 1714–1716	Succeeded by The Duke of Montrose
Preceded by The Marquess of Annandale	Lord Keeper of the Privy Seal of Scotland; 1721–1733	Succeeded by The Duke of Atholl
Preceded by The Duke of Montrose	Lord Keeper of the Great Seal of Scotland; 1733–1761	Succeeded by The Duke of Queensberry and Dover
Peerage of Scotland
Preceded by John Campbell	Duke of Argyll; 1743–1761	Succeeded by John Campbell
New creation	Earl of Ilay; 1706–1761	Extinct
