= 1800 in Scotland =

- Centuries: 16th; 17th; 18th; 19th; 20th
- Decades: 1780s; 1790s; 1800s; 1810s; 1820s
- See also: List of years in Scotland; Timeline of Scottish history 1800 in: Great Britain • Wales • Elsewhere

Events from the year 1800 in Scotland.

== Incumbents ==
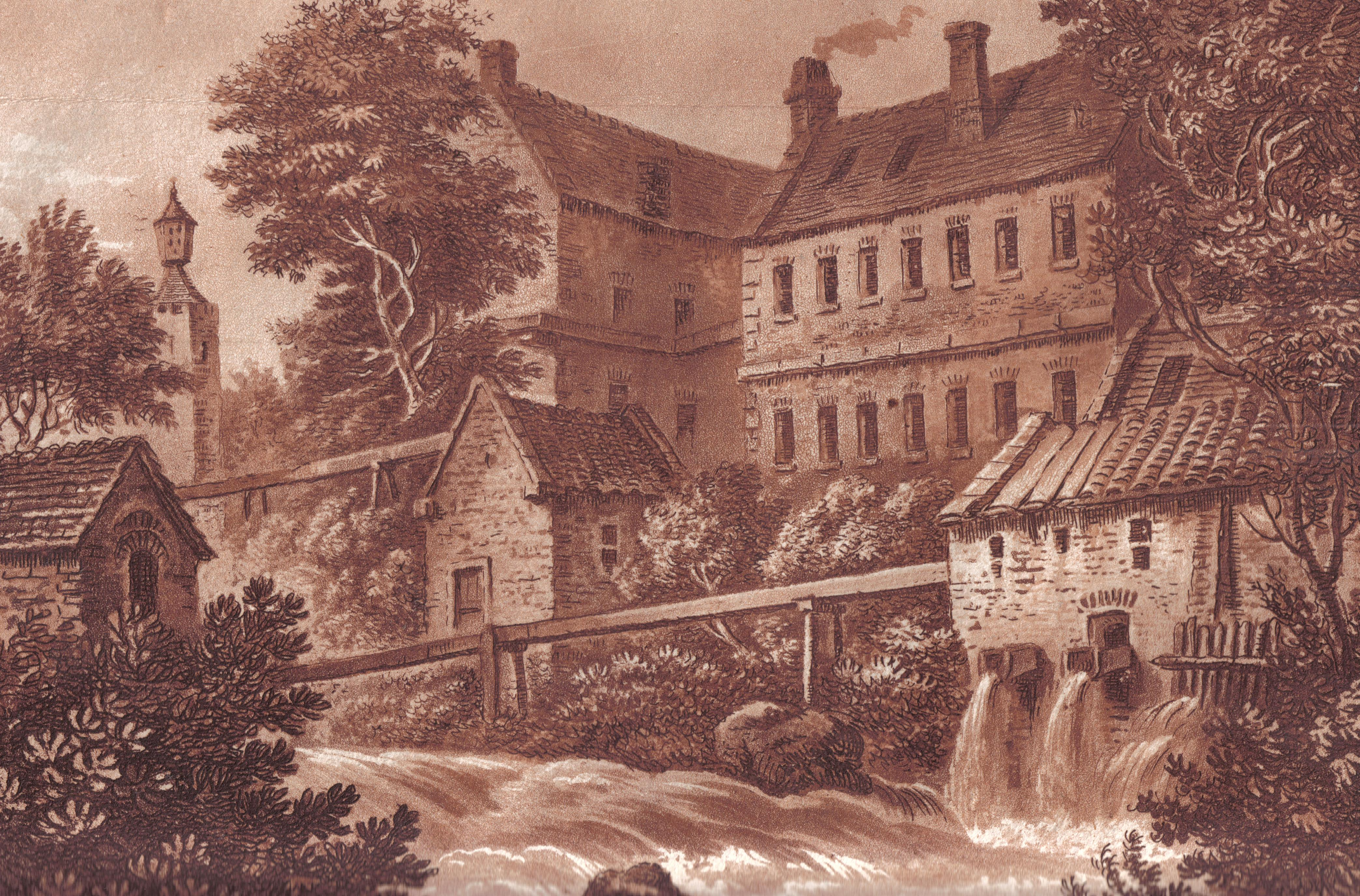
McDowall's & Co. mills at Milton of Campsie in 1800

=== Law officers ===
- Lord Advocate – Robert Dundas of Arniston
- Solicitor General for Scotland – Robert Blair

=== Judiciary ===
- Lord President of the Court of Session – Lord Succoth
- Lord Justice General – The Duke of Montrose
- Lord Justice Clerk – Lord Eskgrove

== Events ==
- 1 January – Robert Owen becomes manager of the New Lanark spinning mills.
- 15 February – "Meal mob" riot over bread prices in Glasgow.
- 30 June – Glasgow Police Act authorises creation of the City of Glasgow Police, which first musters on 15 November.
- August – the 93rd (Sutherland Highlanders) Regiment of Foot is first mustered by William Wemyss at Strathnaver; in September they are sent from Fort George via Aberdeen to Guernsey and in October formally gazetted into the British Army.
- Royal Cornhill Hospital established as Aberdeen Lunatic Asylum.
- Legbrannock Waggonway opened by William Dixon (senior) to move coal from Legbrannock colliery on the Woodhall Estate to the Monkland Canal at Calderbank, an early example of a railway in Scotland.
- New bridges built at Thurso and Wick and Sir John Sinclair plans development of Thurso.
- Approximate date
  - Planned village and pier at Inchyra in the Carse of Gowrie built.
  - Preston Hall, Midlothian, completed.

== Births ==
- 12 January – Duncan McLaren, Liberal politician (died 1886)
- 23 February – William Jardine, naturalist (died 1874 on the Isle of Wight)
- 10 April (bapt.) – George Moir, lawyer (died 1870)
- 16 April – William Chambers, publisher (died 1883)
- 17 April – Catherine Sinclair, novelist (died 1864 in London)
- 22 April – Ralph Robb, Free Church minister in Canada (died 1850 in Canada)
- 26 April – Elizabeth Sinclair, born Eliza McHutcheson, pioneer in Pacific colonies (died 1892 in Hawaii)
- 4 May – John McLeod Campbell, Reformed theologian (died 1872)
- 11 July – Charles Lees, portrait painter (died 1880)
- 3 September – James Braidwood, firefighter (killed firefighting 1861 in London)
- 14 October – Charles Neaves, judge and poet (died 1876)
- 24 October – Alexander Gibson, surgeon and forest conservator in India (died 1867)
- Leitch Ritchie, writer (died 1865 in London)

== Deaths ==
- 30 January – William Forsyth, merchant (born 1722)
- 16 March – David Doig, educator and writer (born 1719)
- 8 April – James Stuart-Mackenzie, politician and astronomer (born c.1719)
- 27 December – Hugh Blair, Presbyterian preacher and man of letters (born 1718)
- 30 December – Duke Gordon, librarian (born 1739)

== The arts ==
- 14 June – Friedrich Schiller's historical drama Mary Stuart has its première in Weimar.
- 27 November – Walter Scott's first original poems, "Glenfinlas" and "The Eve of St. John", are published.
- The Works of Robert Burns is published posthumously.

== See also ==
- 1800 in Great Britain
