= 1801 in Scotland =

- Centuries: 17th; 18th; 19th; 20th; 21st
- Decades: 1780s; 1790s; 1800s; 1810s; 1820s
- See also: List of years in Scotland; Timeline of Scottish history 1801 in: The UK • Wales • Elsewhere

Events from the year 1801 in Scotland.

== Incumbents ==
=== Law officers ===
- Lord Advocate – Robert Dundas of Arniston; then Charles Hope
- Solicitor General for Scotland – Robert Blair

=== Judiciary ===
- Lord President of the Court of Session – Lord Succoth
- Lord Justice General – The Duke of Montrose
- Lord Justice Clerk – Lord Eskgrove

== Events ==
- 1 January – legislative union of Great Britain and Ireland completed under the Act of Union 1800, bringing about the United Kingdom of Great Britain and Ireland.
- 10 March – the first British census is carried out (under terms of the Census Act 1800), with the Scottish counts undertaken by schoolmasters. The population of Scotland is determined to be 1,608,420.
- 16 March – Edinburgh music teacher Anne Gunn is granted the first British patent for a board game, designed as a music teaching aid.
- 4 June – Soldiers of the Ross and Cromarty Rangers fire on a mob in Aberdeen celebrating the King's birthday, killing two.
- 18 July – Crinan Canal opened (although incomplete).
- First complete Bible translation into Scottish Gaelic, Am Bìoball Gàidhlig, is published.
- Dundee Courier & Argus first published.
- John Cary publishes A New Map of Scotland.
- Second Elgin Academy school building (occupied in modern times by Moray College) constructed.
- Edinburgh town council resolves to drain The Meadows.
- John Crabbie of Leith begins to deal in ginger.
- Chivas Brothers open a grocery store in Aberdeen which will blend Chivas Regal whisky.

== Births ==
- 4 January – James Giles, landscape painter (died 1870)
- 14 January – Jane Welsh Carlyle, née Jane Baillie Welsh, letter-writer (died 1866 in London)
- 2 February – George Maclean, colonial governor (died 1847 in Cape Coast)
- 31 May – Robert Rankin, timber merchant and shipowner (died 1870 in England)
- 7 June – Charles Cowan, papermaker and Radical politician (died 1889)
- 24 June – David Haggart, thief and murderer (hanged 1821)
- 4 July – James Johnstone, Liberal politician (died 1888)
- 21 August – Benjamin Boyd, settler in New South Wales (probably killed 1851 ln Guadalcanal)
- 31 August – William Downe Gillon, Whig politician (died 1846)
- 7 November – Robert Dale Owen, social reformer (died 1877 in the United States)
- Alexander Thom, almanac editor (died 1879 in Ireland)

== Deaths ==
- 14 February – Robert Paterson ("Old Mortality"), stonemason (born 1715)
- 28 March – Sir Ralph Abercromby, general (born 1734; died in Egypt)
- 10 May – Richard Gall, poet (born 1776)
- 30 May – John Millar, philosopher (born 1735)
- 11 October – John Donaldson, miniature painter (born 1737; died in London)
- 25 December – Andrew Lumisden, Jacobite (born 1720)
- Jean Glover, poet and singer (born 1758; died in Ireland)

== The arts ==
- 21 July – Greenock Burns Club is established to honour the memory of poet Robert Burns (died 1796) and Poems Ascribed to Robert Burns is published.
- James Hogg publishes Scottish Pastorals, Poems, Songs.

== See also ==
- 1801 in Ireland
