= 1799 in Scotland =

- Centuries: 16th; 17th; 18th; 19th; 20th
- Decades: 1770s; 1780s; 1790s; 1800s; 1810s
- See also: List of years in Scotland; Timeline of Scottish history 1799 in: Great Britain • Wales • Elsewhere

Events from the year 1799 in Scotland.

== Incumbents ==
=== Law officers ===
- Lord Advocate – Robert Dundas of Arniston
- Solicitor General for Scotland – Robert Blair

=== Judiciary ===
- Lord President of the Court of Session – Lord Succoth
- Lord Justice General – The Duke of Montrose
- Lord Justice Clerk – Lord Braxfield, then Lord Eskgrove

== Events ==
- 9 January – Prime Minister William Pitt the Younger introduces an income tax of two shillings to the pound to raise funds for Great Britain's war effort in the Napoleonic Wars.
- June – the last militia regiments in the Highland Fencible Corps are raised at about this time, but most are disbanded this year.
- 3 June – publication of The First (Old) Statistical Account of Scotland concludes.
- 13 June – Colliers Act ("An Act to explain and amend the Laws relative to Colliers in that Part of Great Britain called Scotland") frees coal miners from bondage to their employers, the last vestige of serfdom in Scotland.
- 12 July – the Combination Act is passed by Parliament to outlaw trade unions.
- Glasgow Town Council and private benefactors contribute to purchasing grain to relieve the poor at a time of high food prices.
- The Roman Catholic seminary for the Vicariate Apostolic of the Lowland District is transferred from Scalan to Aquhorthies College by George Hay, the Vicar Apostolic.
- Inverbervie Old Bridge (over the Bervie Water), designed by James Burn, is completed.
- George Buchanan's De Jure Regni apud Scotos (1579) is translated by Robert Macfarlan as A Dialogue Concerning The Rights of the Crown in Scotland.
- William Wallace becomes the first to publish the concept of the Simson line in mathematics.

== Births ==
- 6 February – George Arnott Walker-Arnott, botanist (died 1868)
- 13 February – Robert Willis, physician (died 1878 in London)
- 17 February – John Baird, evangelical minister (died 1861)
- 8 June – John Wilson, promoter of British Israelism (died 1870 in England)
- 25 June – David Douglas, botanist (died 1834 in Hawaii)
- 6 September – Peter Allan, eccentric (died 1849 in Co. Durham)
- 8 September – James Bowman Lindsay, inventor (died 1862)
- 5 November – Robert Carruthers, writer (died 1878)
- 18 December – Charles Macfarlane, travel writer and novelist (died 1858 in London)
- 21 December – David Don, botanist (died 1841 in London)
- Undated
  - John Cunningham, architect (died 1873)
  - George Pirie, newspaper publisher and poet (died 1870 in Canada)
- Approximate date – William Simson, painter best known as a landscapist (died 1847)

== Deaths ==
- 5 January – John Swinton, Lord Swinton, judge (born 1723)
- 19 January – Peter Williamson ("Indian Peter"), tavern keeper, printer, postmaster, inventor, showman and sometime slave in America (born 1730)
- 26 January
  - Gabriel Christie, general and settler in Montreal (born 1722)
  - Thomas Muir of Huntershill, radical (born 1765; died in Paris)
- 26 May – James Burnett, Lord Monboddo, judge and comparative linguist (born 1714)
- 30 May – Robert McQueen, Lord Braxfield, hanging judge (born 1722)
- 1 June – James Tassie, engraver (born 1735)
- 14 June – Sir Patrick Warrender, 3rd Baronet, of Lochend, army officer and politician (born 1739)
- 15 August – Duncan Davidson, merchant and politician (born 1733)
- 6 December – Joseph Black, physician and chemist (born 1728)
- William Cunninghame of Lainshaw, tobacco merchant
- Lachlan McGillivray, fur trader and planter in the Province of Georgia (born 1718/19)

== See also ==
- 1799 in Great Britain
