= 1805 in Scotland =

- Centuries: 17th; 18th; 19th; 20th; 21st
- Decades: 1780s; 1790s; 1800s; 1810s; 1820s
- See also: List of years in Scotland; Timeline of Scottish history 1805 in: The UK • Wales • Elsewhere

Events from the year 1805 in Scotland.

== Incumbents ==
=== Law officers ===
- Lord Advocate – Sir James Montgomery, Bt
- Solicitor General for Scotland – Robert Blair

=== Judiciary ===
- Lord President of the Court of Session – Lord Succoth
- Lord Justice General – The Duke of Montrose
- Lord Justice Clerk – Lord Granton

== Events ==
- 5 June – Edinburgh engraver David Scott and potter Hugh Adamson are executed at Glasgow Cross for forging banknotes.
- 21 October – Battle of Trafalgar: A British Royal Navy fleet led by Admiral Horatio Nelson defeats a combined French and Spanish fleet off the coast of Spain. Around 1,150 of the 18,000 men on the British ships were born in Scotland.
- The planned village of New Scone is established.
- John and James Crombie establish the Crombie clothing company in Aberdeen.
- Isla Bank Mills at Keith are established.
- Killermont House is built at Bearsden for the Campbell-Colquhoun family.
- Rebuilding of Stobo Castle is begun.
- The Snow Tower (keep) of Kildrummy Castle collapses.
- Jean Maxwell is sentenced to a year's imprisoned in Kirkcudbright Tolbooth for "pretending to exercise witchcraft, sorcery, inchantment, conjuration, &c."
- English geologist George Bellas Greenough tours Scotland.

== Births ==
- 26 January – Patrick Fairbairn, theologian (died 1874)
- 30 January – Edward Sang, mathematician (died 1890)
- 8 March – Rayner Stephens, radical reformer and Methodist minister (died 1879 in Stalybridge)
- 26 March – Alexander John Scott, dissident theologian and educationalist (died 1866 in Switzerland)
- 18 May – James Paterson journalist and antiquary (died 1876)
- 26 May – Joseph Grant, poet (died 1835)
- 3 August (bapt.) – William McCombie, agriculturalist (died 1880)
- 8 August – Henry Craik, evangelical preacher and Hebraist (died 1866 in Bristol)
- 11 October – James Salmon, architect (died 1888)
- 28 October – John Thomson, classical composer (died 1841)
- November – Horatio McCulloch, landscape painter (died 1867)
- 10 December – William Anderson, writer (died 1866 in London)
- 13 December – Johann von Lamont, astronomer and physicist (died 1879 in Germany)
- 21 December – Thomas Graham, chemist (died 1869 in Scotland)
- Alexander Forrester, educationalist in Nova Scotia (died 1869 in Canada)
- James Merry, ironmaster, Liberal politician and racehorse breeder (died 1877)
- David Boswell Reid, physician, chemist and "grandfather of air conditioning" (died 1863 in the United States)

== Deaths ==
- 30 January – John Robison, physicist (born 1739)
- 25 February – William Buchan, physician (born 1729)
- 29 March – Jean Elliot, poet (born 1727)
- 28 August – Alexander Carlyle, Church of Scotland leader (born 1722)
- 21 October – George Duff, naval officer (born 1764; killed at Battle of Trafalgar)
- 23 December – Francis Masson, plant hunter (born 1741; died in Montreal)

== The arts ==
- Walter Scott's narrative poem The Lay of the Last Minstrel is published.

== See also ==
- 1805 in Ireland
