= 1808 in Scotland =

- Centuries: 17th; 18th; 19th; 20th; 21st
- Decades: 1780s; 1790s; 1800s; 1810s; 1820s
- See also: List of years in Scotland; Timeline of Scottish history 1808 in: The UK • Wales • Elsewhere

Events from the year 1808 in Scotland.

== Incumbents ==
=== Law officers ===
- Lord Advocate – Archibald Colquhoun
- Solicitor General for Scotland – David Boyle

=== Judiciary ===
- Lord President of the Court of Session – Lord Succoth to 31 August; then Lord Avontoun
- Lord Justice General – The Duke of Montrose
- Lord Justice Clerk – Lord Granton

== Events ==
- January – Christopher Anderson begins missionary work in The Pleasance district of Edinburgh, which will lead to his taking over the Charlotte Chapel.
- 2 March – inaugural meeting of the Wernerian Natural History Society is held in Edinburgh under the presidency of Prof. Robert Jameson.
- 21 May – Thomas Telford's Tongland bridge is fully completed.
- 27 May – the Kilmarnock and Troon Railway becomes the first railway line in Scotland to be authorised by Act of Parliament.
- 7 June – first meeting at the Bogside Racecourse, Irvine.
- October – Thomas Telford's Dunkeld–Birnam bridge is opened to road traffic.
- John Rennie's new Musselburgh Bridge (over the Esk) is completed.
- Court of Session Act reforms the Court of Session.
- Broadford flax mill is established in Aberdeen, the earliest iron-framed textile mill in Scotland.
- William Blackwood begins publication of the Edinburgh Encyclopædia, edited by David Brewster.
- Travel writer Sir John Carr publishes Caledonian Sketches, or a Tour through Scotland in 1807.

== Births ==
- 22 January – James Fergusson, architectural historian (died 1886 in London)
- 29 February – Hugh Falconer, geologist, botanist, paleontologist and paleoanthropologist (died 1865 in London)
- 9 May – John Scott Russell, shipbuilder (died 1882 on the Isle of Wight)
- 11 June – James Ballantine, painter (died 1877)
- 16 June – James Frederick Ferrier, metaphysical and epistemological philosopher (died 1864)
- 2 July – Thomas Simpson, Arctic explorer (probable suicide 1840 in the United States)
- 19 August – James Nasmyth, mechanical engineer (died 1890 in England)
- 24 August – William Lindsay Alexander, church leader (died 1884)
- c. 7 or 8 September – William Livingston (Uilleam Macdhunleibhe), Gaelic poet (died 1870)
- 15 September – John Hutton Balfour, botanist (died 1884)
- 21 September – Evan MacColl, poet writing in Gaelic and English (died 1898 in Canada)
- 19 December – Horatius Bonar, Free Church minister and hymnodist (died 1889)
- James Gall, evangelical minister, astronomer and cartographer (died 1895)
- David Moore, born Muir, botanist (died 1879 in Ireland)
- David Rhind, architect (died 1883)
- James Aitken Wylie, Free Church minister and religious historian (died 1890)

== Deaths ==
- 20 January – Francis Charteris, Lord Elcho (born 1749)
- 28 January – James Finlayson, minister of the Church of Scotland (born 1758)
- 13 February – William Fullarton, British Army officer, agriculturalist and colonial governor (born 1754; died in London)
- 19 June – Alexander Dalrymple, hydrographer (born 1737)
- 2 July – Robert Arnot, Moderator of the General Assembly of the Church of Scotland (born 1744)
- 21 August – John Adamson, Moderator of the General Assembly of the Church of Scotland (born 1742)
- 23 August – Robert Small, Moderator of the General Assembly of the Church of Scotland, mathematician and astronomer (born 1732)
- 5 September – John Home, Episcopalian minister, playwright and writer (born 1722)
- 20 September – John Elliot, Royal Navy officer (born 1732)
- 15 October – James Anderson of Hermiston, agriculturalist (born 1739)
- 24 October – Francis Wemyss-Charteris, landowner (born 1723)

== The arts ==
- Walter Scott's poem Marmion: a tale of Flodden Field is published in Edinburgh.

== See also ==
- 1808 in Ireland
