= 1804 in Scotland =

- Centuries: 17th; 18th; 19th; 20th; 21st
- Decades: 1780s; 1790s; 1800s; 1810s; 1820s
- See also: List of years in Scotland; Timeline of Scottish history 1804 in: The UK • Wales • Elsewhere

Events from the year 1804 in Scotland.

== Incumbents ==
=== Law officers ===
- Lord Advocate – Charles Hope; then Sir James Montgomery, Bt
- Solicitor General for Scotland – Robert Blair

=== Judiciary ===
- Lord President of the Court of Session – Lord Succoth
- Lord Justice General – The Duke of Montrose
- Lord Justice Clerk – Lord Eskgrove, then Lord Granton

== Events ==
- January – HMS York (1796) founders on patrol off Scotland, apparently striking the Inchcape rock, with the loss of all 491 on board.
- 5 April – High Possil meteorite, the first recorded meteorite to fall in Scotland in modern times, falls at Possil.
- 19 August – St Peter's Church, Aberdeen, is dedicated as the city's first purpose-built post-Reformation Roman Catholic church.
- 14 September – lighthouse on Inchkeith, designed by Thomas Smith and Robert Stevenson, is first illuminated.
- The Glasgow Herald is first published under this title.
- Galashiels Baptist Church is established as an independent Baptist congregation.

== Births ==
- 7 January – George Deas, judge (died 1887)
- 13 January – John Pringle Nichol, scientist (died 1859)
- 1 March – John Henderson, ecclesiastical architect (died 1862)
- 22 March – James Smart, chief constable (died 1870)
- 20 June – John Forrest, military doctor (died 1865 in England)
- 15 July – Jane Stirling, pianist, student of Chopin (died 1859)
- 18 September – John Steell, sculptor (died 1891)
- 3 November – Charles Baillie, Lord Jerviswoode, judge (died 1879)
- Robert Davidson, inventor (died 1894)
- Alexander McKay, heavyweight bare-knuckle boxer (died of injury sustained in fight 1830 in England)
- James Mackay, politician in New Zealand (died 1875 in New Zealand)
- George Thompson, shipowner and politician (died 1895)

== Deaths ==
- 11 January – James Tytler, editor of Encyclopædia Britannica (born 1745; died in the United States)
- 26 July – Sir James Cockburn, 8th Baronet, politician (born c.1729)
- 4 August – Adam Duncan, 1st Viscount Duncan, admiral (born 1731; died just south of the border en route to Edinburgh)
- 23 October – David Rae, Lord Eskgrove, judge (born 1724)

== The arts ==
- John Galt's poem The Battle of Largs is published anonymously, the author's first published work.
- David Wilkie paints Pitlessie Fair and William Chalmers-Bethune, his wife Isabella Morison and their Daughter Isabella.

== See also ==
- 1804 in Ireland
