= 1798 in Scotland =

- Centuries: 16th; 17th; 18th; 19th; 20th
- Decades: 1770s; 1780s; 1790s; 1800s; 1810s
- See also: List of years in Scotland; Timeline of Scottish history 1798 in: Great Britain • Wales • Elsewhere

Events from the year 1798 in Scotland.

== Incumbents ==
=== Law officers ===
- Lord Advocate – Robert Dundas of Arniston
- Solicitor General for Scotland – Robert Blair

=== Judiciary ===
- Lord President of the Court of Session – Lord Succoth
- Lord Justice General – The Duke of Montrose* Lord Justice Clerk – Lord Braxfield

== Events ==
- 11 March – Dundee Infirmary opened.
- 26 May – Battle of Tara Hill in the Irish Rebellion of 1798: British forces including three companies of the Reay Fencibles (formed primarily from the Clan Mackay) drive rebels of the Society of United Irishmen from their position with around 400 of the latter killed and only 26 Reay casualties.
- 14 July – United States Consulate in Edinburgh opens.
- 4 December – British Prime Minister William Pitt the Younger announces the introduction of income tax in 1799.
- Highland Park distillery is founded in Kirkwall.
- Tobermory distillery is founded.
- The Merchant Banking Company of Glasgow fails.
- The Ayrshire Regiment of Yeomanry Cavalry is formally adopted into the British Army.
- Orange Order is brought to Scotland by soldiers returning from service in Ulster

== Births ==
- 3 February – Daniel Sandford, Greek scholar, professor and Member of parliament for Paisley (died 1838)
- March – David Hay, interior decorator (died 1866)
- 28 April – Duncan Forbes, linguist (died 1868)
- 23 July – James Hyslop, poet (died 1827)
- 24 July – Mark Napier, lawyer, sheriff, biographer and historical author (died 1879)
- 13 October – Robert Crichton Wyllie, physician, businessman and Minister of Foreign Affairs in the Kingdom of Hawaii (died 1865)
- 27 December – Alexander Colquhoun-Stirling-Murray-Dunlop, Member of Parliament for Greenock from 1852 to 1868 (died 1870)
- 28 December – Thomas James Henderson, astronomer (died 1844)

== Deaths ==
- 21 November – Thomas Hardy, minister (born 1748)
