= 1802 in Scotland =

- Centuries: 17th; 18th; 19th; 20th; 21st
- Decades: 1780s; 1790s; 1800s; 1810s; 1820s
- See also: List of years in Scotland; Timeline of Scottish history 1802 in: The UK • Wales • Elsewhere

Events from the year 1802 in Scotland.

== Incumbents ==
=== Law officers ===
- Lord Advocate – Charles Hope
- Solicitor General for Scotland – Robert Blair

=== Judiciary ===
- Lord President of the Court of Session – Lord Succoth
- Lord Justice General – The Duke of Montrose
- Lord Justice Clerk – Lord Eskgrove

== Events ==
- January – Mitchell's Hospital Old Aberdeen admits its first residents.
- 2 October – first Start Point lighthouse on Sanday, Orkney, completed by Robert Stevenson.
- 10 October – the reforming quarterly The Edinburgh Review is first published by Archibald Constable.
- November – the Royal Philosophical Society of Glasgow is established as the Glasgow Philosophical Society "for the improvement of the Arts and Sciences".
- The planned village of Lybster is established by the local landowner, General Patrick Sinclair.
- The University of Glasgow Medico-Chirurgical Society is established as a student society.
- John Playfair publishes Illustrations of the Huttonian Theory of the Earth in Edinburgh, popularising James Hutton's theory of geology.
- John Home publishes History of the Rebellion of 1745.
- Malcolm Laing publishes History of Scotland from the Union of the Crowns to the Union of the Kingdoms.

== Births ==
- 1 April – William Sharpey, anatomist and physiologist (died 1880 in London)
- 20 May – David Octavius Hill, painter and pioneer photographer (died 1870)
- 10 July – Robert Chambers, publisher, geologist and writer (died 1871)
- 16 July – Humphrey Crum-Ewing, Liberal politician (died 1887)
- 20 August – Robert Ferguson, Liberal politician (died 1868)
- 24 August (bapt.) – John Macgregor, shipbuilder (died 1858)
- 28 August – Thomas Aird, poet (died 1876)
- 19 September – Henry Dundas Trotter, admiral (died 1859 in London)
- 10 October – Hugh Miller, geologist (suicide 1856)
- Thomas Boyd, banker in New South Wales (died 1860 in Australia)

== Deaths ==
- 21 January – John Moore, physician and writer (born 1729; died in London)
- 26 February – Alexander Geddes, Roman Catholic theologian and scholar (born 1737; died in London)
- John Mackay, botanist (born 1772)
- Donald MacNicol, clergyman and writer (born 1735)

== The arts ==
- 29 January – Greenock Burns Club holds the first Burns dinner, in Alloway.
- Walter Scott's collection of Scottish ballads Minstrelsy of the Scottish Border begins publication by James Ballantyne in Kelso.

== See also ==
- 1802 in Ireland
