= 1809 in Scotland =

- Centuries: 17th; 18th; 19th; 20th; 21st
- Decades: 1780s; 1790s; 1800s; 1810s; 1820s
- See also: List of years in Scotland; Timeline of Scottish history 1809 in: The UK • Wales • Elsewhere

Events from the year 1809 in Scotland.

== Incumbents ==
=== Law officers ===
- Lord Advocate – Archibald Colquhoun
- Solicitor General for Scotland – David Boyle

=== Judiciary ===
- Lord President of the Court of Session – Lord Avontoun
- Lord Justice General – The Duke of Montrose
- Lord Justice Clerk – Lord Granton

== Events ==
- c. April – the General Association of Operative Weavers is formed.
- May – a construction railway at the site of Bell Rock Lighthouse is completed.
- August – Crinan Canal declared "finally complete".
- 16 August – Meikle Ferry disaster: An overloaded ferry crossing the Dornoch Firth to Tain market sinks, drowning 99.
- November – Thomas Telford certifies completion of his Dunkeld–Birnam bridge. His bridges at Ballater and Conon Bridge are also completed this year.
- 11 November – the North British and Mercantile Insurance company commences business as a fire insurance office in Edinburgh.
- 9 December – the Dumfries Courier is established as a weekly newspaper in Annan by Rev. Dr. Henry Duncan as The Dumfries and Galloway Courier.
- Highland Clearances – first commissioner for clearance of the Leveson-Gower family estates in Scotland for sheep farming, William Young, is appointed.
- The Tally Toor, a Martello tower, is erected off Leith.
- A bridge over the River Cart is washed away in a flood.
- Blackie and Son, publishers, are established in Glasgow by John Blackie as Blackie, Fullarton and Company.
- The Miller & Richard type foundry is established in Edinburgh by William Miller.
- The Scottish Bible Society is established as the Edinburgh Bible Society, a missionary organization, by Christopher Anderson.
- The Caledonian Horticultural Society is established in Edinburgh.
- Arthur Edmondston's A View of the Ancient and Present State of the Zetland Islands is published.

== Births ==
- 16 February – John Laing, bibliographer and Free Church minister (died 1880)
- 20 April – James David Forbes, physicist, glaciologist and seismologist (died 1868 in Bristol)
- 7 June – William Forbes Skene, historian (died 1892)
- 22 August – John Hill Burton, historian (died 1881)
- 27 August – John West, pioneer of food canning (died 1888 in the United States)
- 8 September – Robert Reid Kalley, physician and Presbyterian missionary to the lusophone countries (died 1888)
- 21 October – John Stenhouse, chemist (died 1880 in London)
- 24 October – John Barr, poet (died 1889 in New Zealand)
- 29 December – William Ewart Gladstone, Prime Minister of the United Kingdom (born in Liverpool; died 1898 in Wales)
- Alexander Allan, locomotive engineer (died 1891 in England)
- Archibald Campbell, born Douglas, laird (died 1868)

== Deaths ==
- 14 January – Robert Anstruther, British Army general (born 1768; died on active service at Corunna)
- 16 January – John Moore, British Army general (born 1761; killed in Battle of Corunna)
- 24 January – James Duff, 2nd Earl Fife (born 1729; died in London)
- 25 February – John Murray, 4th Earl of Dunmore, colonial governor (born 1730; died in Ramsgate)
- 10 May – Andrew Bell, engraver, co-founder of the Encyclopædia Britannica (born 1726)
- 3 August – Andrew Mackay, mathematician (born 1760; died in London)
- 29 August – Robert Melvill, British Army general and antiquary (born 1723)
- 8 October – James Elphinston, philologist (born 1721; died in London)
- 18 December – Alexander Adam, classical scholar (born 1741)
- Sir William Douglas, 1st Baronet, landowner and industrialist

== See also ==
- 1809 in Ireland
