= 1807 in Scotland =

- Centuries: 17th; 18th; 19th; 20th; 21st
- Decades: 1780s; 1790s; 1800s; 1810s; 1820s
- See also: List of years in Scotland; Timeline of Scottish history 1807 in: The UK • Wales • Elsewhere

Events from the year 1807 in Scotland.

== Incumbents ==
=== Law officers ===
- Lord Advocate – Henry Erskine; then Archibald Colquhoun
- Solicitor General for Scotland – John Clerk; then David Boyle

=== Judiciary ===
- Lord President of the Court of Session – Lord Succoth
- Lord Justice General – The Duke of Montrose
- Lord Justice Clerk – Lord Granton

== Events ==
- June – Thomas Telford's stone bridge at Wick is completed.
- 13 July – with the death at Frascati of Cardinal Henry Benedict Stuart, the last Stuart claimant to the British throne, the movement of Jacobitism comes to an effective end.
- 17 August – Robert Stevenson and his workmen set out to begin construction of the Bell Rock Lighthouse from Arbroath in the Smeaton.
- Autumn – the "Old Academy" building for Perth Academy, designed by Robert Reid, is completed.
- 21 October – foundation stone of the Nelson Monument, Edinburgh, on Calton Hill, is laid.
- Highland Clearances – clearance of crofting tenants from the Highland estates of the Marchioness and her husband the Marquess of Stafford to make way for sheep and other farming begins at Farr and Lairg.
- The planned village of Evanton is established in Easter Ross by Alexander Fraser of Inchcoulter/Balconie.
- The Hunterian Museum is opened to the public in Glasgow.
- The post of Regius Professor of Zoology in the University of Glasgow is established as the Regius Chair of Natural History by King George III, Lockhart Muirhead being the first holder.
- John Smith is appointed official city architect of Aberdeen.
- The publisher A & C Black is founded by Adam and Charles Black in Edinburgh.
- The religious publisher Oliphant, Anderson and Ferrier is established as booksellers Oliphant and Brown by William Oliphant in Edinburgh.
- Millburn distillery is established as the Inverness Distillery by a Mr. Welsh.
- The use of fulminate in firearms is patented by the Rev. Alexander John Forsyth.
- William Wallace proves that any two simple polygons of equal area are equidecomposable, later known as the Bolyai–Gerwien theorem.

== Births ==
- 27 March – Lauderdale Maule, British Army officer (died of disease contracted on service in the Crimean War 1854)
- 9 April – James Bannerman, Free Church theologian (died 1868)
- 28 April – Alan Stevenson, lighthouse designer (died 1865)
- September – David Deas, British Royal Navy medical officer (died 1876)
- 10 November – John Cumming, Presbyterian minister (died 1881 in London)
- Approximate date – Peter Gray, actuary (died 1887)

== Deaths ==
- 1 March – Niel Gow, fiddler (born 1727)
- 16 June – John Skinner, Episcopalian minister and songwriter (born 1721)
- 26 June – Francis Peacock, "father of Scottish country dance" (born 1723)

== The arts ==
- James Hogg, Thomas Mouncey Cunningham and others publish the poetry collection The Forest Minstrel, and Hogg publishes The Mountain Bard.
- David Wilkie paints Rent Day.

== See also ==
- 1807 in Ireland
