= 1803 in Scotland =

- Centuries: 17th; 18th; 19th; 20th; 21st
- Decades: 1780s; 1790s; 1800s; 1810s; 1820s
- See also: List of years in Scotland; Timeline of Scottish history 1803 in: The UK • Wales • Elsewhere

Events from the year 1803 in Scotland.

== Incumbents ==
=== Law officers ===
- Lord Advocate – Charles Hope
- Solicitor General for Scotland – Robert Blair

=== Judiciary ===
- Lord President of the Court of Session – Lord Succoth
- Lord Justice General – The Duke of Montrose
- Lord Justice Clerk – Lord Eskgrove

== Events ==
- 4 January – William Symington demonstrates his Charlotte Dundas, the "first practical steamboat".
- 27 July – Caledonian Canal authorized by Act of Parliament and construction begins; Thomas Telford also this year begins work on improving roads in Scotland under the auspices of the Commissioners of Highland Roads and Bridges. and on his recommendation the British Fisheries Society acquires the site of Pulteneytown at Wick for development.
- Kelso Bridge, designed by John Rennie, completed.
- First Boulton and Watt steam engine in Scotland installed at an Aberdeen paper mill.
- Lismore Seminary is opened by the Catholic Church.
- Most of the 'Luckenbooths' in High Street, Edinburgh are demolished, opening up the prospect of St Giles' Cathedral.

== Births ==
- 15 January – Marjorie Fleming, child writer (died 1811)
- 3 April – David Bryce, architect (died 1876)
- 16 April – Edward Maitland, Lord Barcaple, judge (died 1870)
- 12 July – Thomas Guthrie, Free Church preacher and philanthropist (died 1873)
- 22 July – John Notman, architect in the United States (died 1865)
- 10 September – Robert Wilson, mechanical engineer, inventor of the screw propeller (died 1882 in England)
- 16 October – James Edward Alexander, soldier, author and traveller (died 1885)
- 25 December – Donald Gregory, antiquarian (died 1836) and his twin brother William Gregory, chemist and psychic investigator (died 1858)
- George Patton, Lord Glenalmond, judge (suicide 1869)

== Deaths ==
- 2 April – Sir James Montgomery, 1st Baronet, politician and judge (born 1721)
- 6 April – William Hamilton, diplomat (born 1730)
- 3 June – Lord George Murray, Bishop of St David's and developer of the UK's first optical telegraph (born 1761)
- 18 August – James Beattie, poet and philosopher (born 1735)
- Approximate date – Johnnie Notions (John Williamson), self-taught physician, pioneer of inoculation (born c. 1730)

== The arts ==
- Recollections of a Tour Made in Scotland, A. D. 1803 written by Dorothy Wordsworth (published 1874)

== See also ==
- Timeline of Scottish history
- 1803 in Ireland
