= 1797 in Scotland =

- Centuries: 16th; 17th; 18th; 19th; 20th
- Decades: 1770s; 1780s; 1790s; 1800s; 1810s
- See also: List of years in Scotland; Timeline of Scottish history 1797 in: Great Britain • Wales • Elsewhere

Events from the year 1797 in Scotland.

== Incumbents ==
=== Law officers ===
- Lord Advocate – Robert Dundas of Arniston
- Solicitor General for Scotland – Robert Blair

=== Judiciary ===
- Lord President of the Court of Session – Lord Succoth
- Lord Justice General – The Duke of Montrose
- Lord Justice Clerk – Lord Braxfield

== Events ==
- 19 July – Act to Raise and Embody a Militia Force in Scotland.
- 29 August – Massacre of Tranent: British troops attack protestors against enforced recruitment into the militia at Tranent in East Lothian, killing 12.
- 11 October (12 October naval reckoning) – Battle of Camperdown: Royal Navy led by Dundee-born Admiral Duncan defeats the fleet of the Batavian Republic off the coast of Holland.
- Cloch lighthouse completed.
- Johnston Press established as printers in Falkirk.
- Johnstons of Elgin established as a textile mill in Elgin, Moray.
- Keiller's marmalade first produced in Dundee.
- Publication of Encyclopædia Britannica Third Edition is completed in Edinburgh.

== Births ==
- 29 April – George Don, botanist (died 1856)
- 10 October – Thomas Drummond, military surveyor and Under-Secretary for Ireland (died 1840 in Ireland)
- 14 November – Charles Lyell, geologist (died 1875 in England)
- 3 December – Andrew Smith, military surgeon, explorer, ethnologist and zoologist (died 1872 in England)

== Deaths ==
- 26 March – James Hutton, geologist (born 1726)
- 30 December – David Martin, portrait painter and engraver (born 1737)

== The arts ==
- 24 December – Walter Scott marries Charlotte Carpenter at St Mary's Church, Carlisle, and the couple immediately move into their new home at 50 George Street, Edinburgh.
