= 1806 in Scotland =

- Centuries: 17th; 18th; 19th; 20th; 21st
- Decades: 1780s; 1790s; 1800s; 1810s; 1820s
- See also: List of years in Scotland; Timeline of Scottish history 1806 in: The UK • Wales • Elsewhere

Events from the year 1806 in Scotland.

== Incumbents ==
=== Law officers ===
- Lord Advocate – Sir James Montgomery, Bt; then Henry Erskine
- Solicitor General for Scotland – Robert Blair; then John Clerk

=== Judiciary ===
- Lord President of the Court of Session – Lord Succoth
- Lord Justice General – The Duke of Montrose
- Lord Justice Clerk – Lord Granton

== Events ==
- 20 May – new wet dock at Leith opened.
- 20 June – the Glasgow, Paisley and Johnstone Canal is authorised.
- 31 August – new harbour at Ardrossan begun.
- 25 December – Stotfield fishing disaster: all 21 able-bodied men of the village of Stotfield are drowned when all three of their fishing boats are overwhelmed by a storm in the Moray Firth.
- Henry Dundas is impeached, on the initiative of Samuel Whitbread, for the misappropriation of public money at the Admiralty but is acquitted. This will be the last impeachment trial ever held in the House of Lords.
- The first Spey Bridge at Fochabers, designed by Thomas Telford, is completed.
- Fraserburgh's first rescue lifeboat is placed on station.
- Napoleonic Wars: Defensive gun batteries placed on the island of Inchgarvie in the Firth of Forth.
- New building of Rosneath House to an 1803 Romanesque Revival design by Joseph Bonomi the Elder is finished.

== Births ==
- 1 February – George Harvey, genre painter (died 1876)
- 19 March – John Coldstream, physician (died 1863 in England)
- 26 March – James Hogg, publisher (died 1888 in England)
- 15 April – Alexander Duff, Church of Scotland missionary to India (died 1878 in England)
- 4 June – Daniel Macnee, portrait painter (died 1882)
- 5 July – James Dawson, Guardian of Australian Aboriginals (died 1900 in Australia)
- 20 July – John Sterling, author (died 1844 in England)
- 19 September – William Dyce, painter (died 1864 in England)
- October – William Atherton, lawyer and liberal politician (died 1864 in England)
- 10 or 12 October – David Scott, historical painter (died 1849)
- 10 December – David Robertson, marine biologist (died 1896)
- James Graham, missionary photographer (died 1869)

== Deaths ==
- 30 January – David Smythe, Lord Methven, judge (born 1746)
- 20 February – Lachlan McIntosh, military and political leader (born 1725; died in Savannah, Georgia)
- 17 March – David Dale, businessman and philanthropist (born 1739)
- 5 April – Benjamin Bell, surgeon (born 1749)
- 24 May – John Campbell, 5th Duke of Argyll, field marshal (born 1723)
- 29 December – Charles Lennox, 3rd Duke of Richmond, politician (born 1735)
- Mungo Park, explorer (born 1771; died in Bussa, Nigeria)

== The arts ==
- Thomas Bruce, 7th Earl of Elgin, begins to ship the Elgin Marbles to Britain from Greece.
- Walter Scott's Ballads and Lyrical Pieces is published.

== See also ==
- 1806 in Ireland
