= 1810 in Scotland =

- Centuries: 17th; 18th; 19th; 20th; 21st
- Decades: 1790s; 1800s; 1810s; 1820s; 1830s
- See also: List of years in Scotland; Timeline of Scottish history 1810 in: The UK • Wales • Elsewhere

Events from the year 1810 in Scotland.

== Incumbents ==
=== Law officers ===
- Lord Advocate – Archibald Colquhoun
- Solicitor General for Scotland – David Boyle

=== Judiciary ===
- Lord President of the Court of Session – Lord Avontoun
- Lord Justice General – The Duke of Montrose
- Lord Justice Clerk – Lord Granton

== Events ==
- 25 March – the Commercial Bank of Scotland is founded in Edinburgh by John Pitcairn, Lord Cockburn and others.
- 10 May – Rev. Henry Duncan opens the world's first commercial savings bank in Ruthwell, Dumfriesshire.
- 10 November – Paisley canal disaster: A pleasure craft capsizes on the newly-completed first section of the Glasgow, Paisley and Johnstone Canal with the loss of 84 lives.
- 19 December – Frigates HMS Nymphe and HMS Pallas are wrecked near Dunbar.
- Monach Islands abandoned for the first time, due to overgrazing.
- Edinburgh Theological College founded to train clergy for the Scottish Episcopal Church.

== Births ==
- 5 February – John Muir, Indologist (died 1882)
- 2 April – Thomas Balfour, politician (died 1838)
- 19 June – Charles Wilson, architect (died 1863)
- August – William Miller, poet (died 1872)
- 19 August – Edward Ellice, Liberal politician (died 1880)
- 21 August – John Inglis, judge (died 1891)
- 22 September – John Brown, physician and essayist (died 1882)
- 12 October – Alexander Bain, inventor (died 1877)
- 8 December – John Strain, first Roman Catholic Archbishop of St Andrews and Edinburgh (died 1883)
- 17 December – Andrew Findlater, editor (died 1885)

== Deaths ==
- 17 May – Robert Tannahill, "weaver poet" (born 1774)
- 8 December – John Finlay, poet (born 1782)
- Probable date – William Cruickshank, military surgeon, chemist and inventor (born c1741)

== The arts ==
- Jane Porter's historical novel about William Wallace, The Scottish Chiefs, is published.
- Walter Scott's narrative poem The Lady of the Lake is published.

== See also ==
- 1810 in Ireland
