= 1951 in Scotland =

- Centuries: 18th; 19th; 20th; 21st
- Decades: 1930s; 1940s; 1950s; 1960s; 1970s
- See also: List of years in Scotland; Timeline of Scottish history 1951 in: The UK • Wales • Elsewhere; Scottish football: 1950–51 • 1951–52

Events from the year 1951 in Scotland.

== Incumbents ==
- Secretary of State for Scotland and Keeper of the Great Seal – Hector McNeil until 26 October; then James Stuart

=== Law officers ===
- Lord Advocate – John Thomas Wheatley until November; then James Latham Clyde
- Solicitor General for Scotland – Douglas Johnston until November; then William Rankine Milligan

=== Judiciary ===
- Lord President of the Court of Session and Lord Justice General – Lord Cooper
- Lord Justice Clerk – Lord Thomson
- Chairman of the Scottish Land Court – Lord Gibson

== Events ==
- 11 April – The Stone of Scone is located in Arbroath Abbey having been stolen by Scottish nationalists.
- 12 May – Remains of Gunnister Man found in a peat bog in Shetland.
- 18–26 May – Festival of Britain: Festival Ship Campania on view in Dundee (King George V Dock).
- 25 May–8 September – Festival of Britain: Living Traditions exhibition presented at the Royal Scottish Museum, Edinburgh, by the Council of Industrial Design.
- 28 May–18 August – Festival of Britain: Exhibition of Industrial Power in Glasgow (opened by The Princess Elizabeth).
- 18 September–6 October – Festival of Britain: Festival Ship Campania on view in Glasgow (Springfield Dock).
- 26 October – 1951 United Kingdom general election: The Conservative Party and allies narrowly defeat Labour in Scotland and across the UK; this is the last election in which the Conservatives do better in Scotland than in England.
- 30 October – James Stuart is appointed Secretary of State for Scotland; he will hold office until January 1957.
- November – Ecurie Ecosse motor racing team founded by Edinburgh businessman and racing driver David Murray and mechanic Wilkie Wilkinson.
- 7 November – first floodlit Association football match in Scotland, a Stenhousemuir v. Hibernian F.C. friendly at the former's Ochilview Park.
- 24 November – Beinn Eighe becomes Britain's first national nature reserve.
- Publication of The Third Statistical Account of Scotland commences with the volume for Ayrshire.

== Births ==
- 2 February – Ken Bruce, radio broadcaster
- 7 February – Eddie Kelly, footballer
- 20 February – Gordon Brown, Labour politician and Prime Minister of the United Kingdom 2007–10
- 4 March – Kenny Dalglish, international footballer and manager
- 25 April – Ian McCartney, Labour politician
- 6 May – Davey Johnstone, rock guitarist
- 17 July – Doug Allan, wildlife cameraman (died 2026 in Nepal)
- 9 August – James Naughtie, print and radio journalist
- 22 August – Alex Neil, Scottish National Party MSP and government minister
- 16 September – Judith Miller, antiques expert (died 2023)
- 23 September – Andrew Greig, author
- 26 September – Stuart Tosh, born Stuart MacIntosh, rock musician
- 28 September – Jim Diamond, singer-songwriter (died 2015)
- 17 November – Jack Vettriano, born Jack Hoggan, painter (died 2025 in France)
- 19 November – Charles Falconer, Baron Falconer of Thoroton, Labour politician and Lord Chancellor
- 15 December – Joe Jordan, international footballer and manager
- 20 December – Peter May, fiction writer
- 22 December – Jim McColl, entrepreneur
- Michael Scott Rohan, fantasy writer

== Deaths ==
- 3 January – Peter McBride, footballer (born 1877)
- 15 January - Ebenezer James MacRae architect, City Architect for Edinburgh
- 29 January – James Bridie (O. H. Mavor), playwright (born 1888)
- 3 May – Sir Thomas Henderson, Liberal politician (born 1874)
- 16 May – James Greenlees, rugby union footballer, educationalist and soldier (born 1878)
- 9 September – Andrew Blain Baird, engineer and aviation pioneer (born 1862)
- 1 October – Peter McWilliam, international footballer and manager (born 1879)
- 11 October – Donald Cameron, 25th Lochiel, chief of Clan Cameron (born 1876)

== The arts ==
- 19 May – Pitlochry Festival Theatre opens in a tent with the British première of Maxwell Anderson’s Mary of Scotland.
- School of Scottish Studies founded.

== See also ==
- 1951 in Northern Ireland
