= 1882 in Scotland =

- Centuries: 17th; 18th; 19th; 20th; 21st
- Decades: 1860s; 1870s; 1880s; 1890s; 1900s
- See also: List of years in Scotland; Timeline of Scottish history 1882 in: The UK • Wales • Elsewhere; Scottish football: 1881–82 • 1882–83

Events from the year 1882 in Scotland.

== Incumbents ==
=== Law officers ===
- Lord Advocate – John Blair Balfour
- Solicitor General for Scotland – Alexander Asher

=== Judiciary ===
- Lord President of the Court of Session and Lord Justice General – Lord Glencorse
- Lord Justice Clerk – Lord Moncreiff

== Events ==
- 2 March – Roderick Maclean fails in an attempt to assassinate Queen Victoria at Windsor, Berkshire.
- 1 June – Rothesay tramway opened on the Isle of Bute; a salt-water swimming bath is also opened in Rothesay this year.
- June – St. Andrew's Ambulance Association is officially founded with a constitution being adopted at a general meeting in Glasgow.
- July – HM Prison Barlinnie opened in Glasgow.
- 27 November – Inverythan rail accident: a cast iron girder underbridge in Aberdeenshire collapses as a Great North of Scotland Railway train passes over, causing at least 5 deaths.
- 20 December – Hospital for Sick Children, Glasgow, opened at Garnethill.
- Battle of the Braes on Skye: Protests by crofting tenants facing eviction. Police from Glasgow and the military are sent to restore order.
- Vat 69 blended whisky first produced by William Sanderson & Son of South Queensferry.
- 2 December (unconfirmed) Wemyss Ware is first produced by the Fife Pottery in Kirkcaldy.
- Founding of Albion Rovers F.C. through the amalgamation of two Coatbridge clubs, Albion and Rovers.
- Lewis Campbell publishes The Life of James Clerk Maxwell, with a Selection from his Correspondence and Occasional Writings and a Sketch of his Contributions to Science, including some of Maxwell's verses.
- Archaeologist Robert Munro publishes Ancient Scottish Lake Dwellings or Crannogs.

== Births ==
- 6 January – Alexander Gray, economist, poet and translator (died 1968)
- 2 February – Joseph Wedderburn, mathematician (died 1948)
- 20 February – Alexander Carrick, sculptor (died 1966)
- 24 April – Hugh Dowding, Air Chief Marshal (died 1970)
- 28 May – Donald McLeod, footballer (killed 1917 in Battle of Passchendaele)
- 16 June – Norah Neilson Gray, portrait painter (died 1931)
- 18 June – Thomas S. Tait, architect (died 1954)
- 8 July – John Anderson, 1st Viscount Waverley, civil servant and politician (died 1958)
- 2 November – Frederick Farrell, watercolourist, war artist (died 1935)
- John Alexander Stewart, orientalist (died 1948)

== Deaths ==
- 17 January – Sir Daniel Macnee, portrait painter (born 1806)
- 23 January – Robert Christison, toxicologist, physician and president of the British Medical Association (1875) (born 1797)
- 7 March – John Muir, Indologist (born 1810)
- 10 March – Sir Charles Wyville Thomson, marine zoologist (born 1830)
- 11 May – John Brown, physician and writer (born 1810)

== The arts ==
- American scholar Francis James Child begins publication of The English and Scottish Popular Ballads, the Child Ballads.
- Gaelic poet William Livingston (Uilleam Macdhunleibhe)'s collected works are published posthumously as Duain agus Orain.

== See also ==
- Timeline of Scottish history
- 1882 in Ireland
