= Alexander Balfour (novelist) =

Scottish novelist

Alexander Balfour (1767–1829) was a Scottish novelist born in the parish of Monikie, Forfarshire.

== Biography ==
Balfour was born on 1 March 1767 to parents who were both of the humblest peasantry. Being a twin, he was from his birth under the care of a relative. He was physically weak. His education was of the scantiest. When a mere lad he was apprenticed to a weaver. Later he taught in a school in his native parish, and many lived to remember him gratefully for his rough and ready but successful teaching of them. In his twenty-sixth year (1793) he became one of the clerks of a merchant manufacturer in Arbroath. In 1794 he married.

He commenced writing at the age of twelve. Not very long after he filled "the poets' corner" in the local newspaper. Later he contributed verse to the British Chronicle newspaper and to The Bee of Dr. Anderson. In 1793 he was one of the writers in the Dundee Repository and in 1796 in the Aberdeen Magazine.

Four years after his removal to Arbroath he changed his situation, and two years later, on the death of his first employer, he carried on the business in partnership with his widow. On her retirement in 1800 he look another partner, and, having succeeded in obtaining a government contract to supply the navy with canvas, in a few years he possessed considerable property.

During the war with France, he published patriotic poems and songs in the Dundee Advertiser, which were reprinted in London. To the Northern Minstrel of Newcastle upon Tyne he furnished many songs, and a number of poems to the Montrose Literary Mirror. Ha wrote an account of Arbroath for Sir David Brewster's Edinburgh Encyclopædia and several papers for Alexander Tilloch's Philosophical Magazine.

In 1814 he removed to Trottick, near Dundee, as manager of a branch of a London house. In the following year it became bankrupt, and Balfour was again thrown on the world. He found a poor employment as manager of a manufacturing establishment at Balgonie, Fife. In October 1818, for the sake of his children's education, he transferred himself to Edinburgh, and obtained a situation as clerk in the great publishing house of the Messrs. Blackwood. Unhappily in the course of a few months he was struck down by paralysis, and in June 1818 was obliged to relinquish his employment. He recovered so far that he could be wheeled about in a specially prepared chair. His intellect was untouched, and he devoted himself to literature.

In 1819 appeared his Campbell; or the Scottish Probationer (3 vols.). The novel was well received. In the same year he edited Richard Gall's 'Poems,' with a memoir. In 1820 he published Contemplation; with Other Poems (1 vol). In 1822 came his second novel of the Farmer's Three Daughters (3 vols.), and in 1823 the Foundling of Glenthorn; or the Smuggler's Cave, a Romance (3 vols.). In 1825 he republished from Constable's Edinburgh Magazine Characters omitted in Crabbe's Parish Register (1 vol.), and his Highland Mary (4 vols.) in 1827.

He died on 12 September 1829. The Remains, entitled Weeds and Wildflowers, were edited by Dr. D. M. Moir with a sympathetic memoir. Balfour wrote his novels for The Minerva Press, as needing "daily bread" but he never pandered to the low morals of its habitual readers. Pathos and shrewdness of insight and a very graphic faculty of sketching character are his chief characteristics. Canning sent him a grant of £100. in recognition of his ability and misfortunes.

== Works ==
- The genius of Caledonia: a poem on the threatened French invasion. 1798. Edinburgh : printed for J. Symington. 8pp. Anonymous but attributed to Balfour, by Thomas Campbell. Moir also mentions his authorship. First published in 'The Edinburgh Magazine and Literary Miscellany' in 1796.
- Campbell or The Scottish Probationer. 1819. Oliver & Boyd. 3 volumes.
- Contemplation and other poems. 1820. Printed by William Watson and sold by Archibald Constable.
- The Farmers' Three Daughters. 1822. London: A.E.Newman at the Minerva Press. 4 volumes.
- The Foundling of Glenthorn, or the Smugglers' Cave. 1823. London: A.E.Newman at the Minerva Press. 4 volumes.
- Characters, omitted in Crabbe's Parish Register; with other tales. [In verse.] 1825. Published for the author and sold by Archibald Constable.
- Highland Mary. 1826.London: A.E.Newman at the Minerva Press. 4 volumes.
- Weeds and Wildflowers. 1830. Edinburgh: Daniel Lizars.Includes a memoir of the author by David 'Macbeth' Moir.
