= 1883 in Scotland =

- Centuries: 17th; 18th; 19th; 20th; 21st
- Decades: 1860s; 1870s; 1880s; 1890s; 1900s
- See also: List of years in Scotland; Timeline of Scottish history 1883 in: The UK • Wales • Elsewhere; Scottish football: 1882–83 • 1883–84

Events from the year 1883 in Scotland.

== Incumbents ==
=== Law officers ===
- Lord Advocate – John Blair Balfour
- Solicitor General for Scotland – Alexander Asher

=== Judiciary ===
- Lord President of the Court of Session and Lord Justice General – Lord Glencorse
- Lord Justice Clerk – Lord Moncreiff

== Events ==
- 20 January – Fenian dynamite campaign: In Glasgow, bombs explode at Tradeston Gasworks, Possil Street Bridge and Buchanan Street railway station; about a dozen people are injured.
- 28 April – the first rugby sevens tournament is played at Melrose RFC.
- 3 June – Sabbatarian riot at Stromeferry: the local fishing community prevent the loading of fish (caught by east coast fishermen) from Stornoway ships to railway on a Sunday.
- 3 July – SS Daphne sinks on launch at Alexander Stephen and Sons' Linthouse shipyard, leaving 124 dead.
- 29 August – Dunfermline Carnegie Library, the first Carnegie library in the world, is opened in Andrew Carnegie's hometown, Dunfermline.
- 4 October – the Boys' Brigade is founded in Glasgow.
- November–December – the Tay Whale (a humpback) appears in the Firth of Tay; on 31 December it is harpooned but escapes, dying later.
- Denny Ship Model Experiment Tank at Dumbarton completed.
- Edinburgh Mathematical Society founded.

== Sport ==
- Association Football
  - Raith Rovers F.C. is established in Kirkcaldy.
- Curling
  - Scotland's first boys' club is established in Wanlockhead.
- Rugby union
  - Scotland take part in the inaugural Home Nations Championship.
  - Scotlands first home international game played at Raeburn Place in Edinburgh.
  - First match against Wales, hosted at St. Helen's Rugby and Cricket Ground in Swansea; Scotland win by three goals to one.

== Births ==
- 17 January – Compton Mackenzie, author and co-founder in 1928 of the Scottish National Party (born in England; died 1972)
- 27 January – James Lithgow, industrialist (died 1952)
- 24 March – Dorothy Campbell, golfer (died 1945 in the United States)
- 12 April – Francis Cadell, Colourist painter (died 1937)
- 15 May – Lord Ninian Crichton-Stuart, British Army officer and Unionist politician (killed in action 1915 in France)
- 5 June – Mary Helen Young, nurse and resistance fighter during World War II (died 1945 in Germany)
- 9 July – John Watson, advocate and sheriff, Solicitor General for Scotland 1929–31 (died 1944)
- 21 August – Victor Fortune, British Army officer (died 1949)
- 17 October – A. S. Neill, educationalist (died 1973 in England)
- 17 December – David Powell, stage and silent film actor (died 1925 in the United States)

== Deaths ==
- 27 March – John Brown, royal servant (born 1826)
- 8 May – John Miller, civil engineer (born 1805)
- 20 May – William Chambers, publisher and politician (born 1800)
- 2 July – John Strain, first Roman Catholic Archbishop of St Andrews and Edinburgh (born 1810)
- 9 August – Robert Moffat, missionary (born 1795)
- David Rhind, architect (born 1808)

== The arts ==
- James Guthrie paints A Hind's Daughter and To Pastures New.

== See also ==
- Timeline of Scottish history
- 1883 in Ireland
