= 1875 in Scotland =

- Centuries: 17th; 18th; 19th; 20th; 21st
- Decades: 1850s; 1860s; 1870s; 1880s; 1890s
- See also: List of years in Scotland; Timeline of Scottish history 1875 in: The UK • Wales • Elsewhere; Scottish football: 1874–75 • 1875–76

Events from the year 1875 in Scotland.

== Incumbents ==
=== Law officers ===
- Lord Advocate – Edward Strathearn Gordon
- Solicitor General for Scotland – William Watson

=== Judiciary ===
- Lord President of the Court of Session and Lord Justice General – Lord Glencorse
- Lord Justice Clerk – Lord Moncreiff

== Events ==
- 9 March – the Advocates Library in Edinburgh suffers a serious fire.
- 6 August – Hibernian F.C. is founded by Irishmen in the Cowgate area of Edinburgh.
- 16 September – first patients admitted to Barony Parochial Asylum at Lenzie (official opening 22 October).
- 17 November – the Dandie Dinmont Terrier Club established in a meeting at the Fleece Hotel, Selkirk.
- 8 December – Inverness Field Club is established.
- 25 December – the first Edinburgh derby in Association football is played: Heart of Midlothian F.C. win 1–0 against Hibernian F.C.
- Chartered Institute of Bankers in Scotland is established as the world's oldest professional banking institution.
- The Edinburgh School of Cookery and Domestic Economy, predecessor of Queen Margaret University, is founded by Christian Guthrie Wright and Louisa Stevenson of the Edinburgh Ladies' Educational Association.
- Longmore House is opened as a hospital by the Edinburgh Association for the Relief of Incurables.
- The Aberdeen, Leith & Clyde Shipping Company is renamed as the North of Scotland, Orkney & Shetland Steam Navigation Company.

== Births ==
- 20 February – Mary Barbour, née Rough, political activist, local councillor and magistrate (died 1958)
- 20 March – Jessie M. King, illustrator and designer (died 1949)
- 26 July – Daniel Laidlaw, piper and recipient of the Victoria Cross (died 1950 in Northumberland)
- 11 August – Percy Erskine Nobbs, Arts and Crafts architect in Canada (died 1964)
- 26 August – John Buchan, novelist, historian, Unionist politician and Governor General of Canada (died 1940 in Canada)
- Robert MacGregor Mitchell, Lord MacGregor Mitchell, Chairman of the Scottish Land Court 1934–38 (died 1938)

== Deaths ==
- 22 March – Alexander Thomson, classical architect (born 1817)
- 25 December – Young Tom Morris, youngest winner of golf's Open Championship (born 1851; official cause of death is "heart attack")
- James McLevy, detective (born 1796 in Ireland)

== The arts ==
- 12 February – Robert Louis Stevenson is introduced to fellow writer W. E. Henley, at this time (August 1873–April 1875) a patient of surgeon Joseph Lister in the Royal Infirmary of Edinburgh; Henley will be the model for Long John Silver. Henley has also met his future wife while in hospital and written the poems collected as In Hospital. In July Stevenson qualifies as an advocate, but never practices.

== See also ==
- Timeline of Scottish history
- 1875 in Ireland
