= Alexander Murray, Lord Henderland =

Scottish judge and politician (1736–1795)

Alexander Murray, Lord Henderland (11 May 1736 – 16 March 1795) was a Scottish judge and politician.

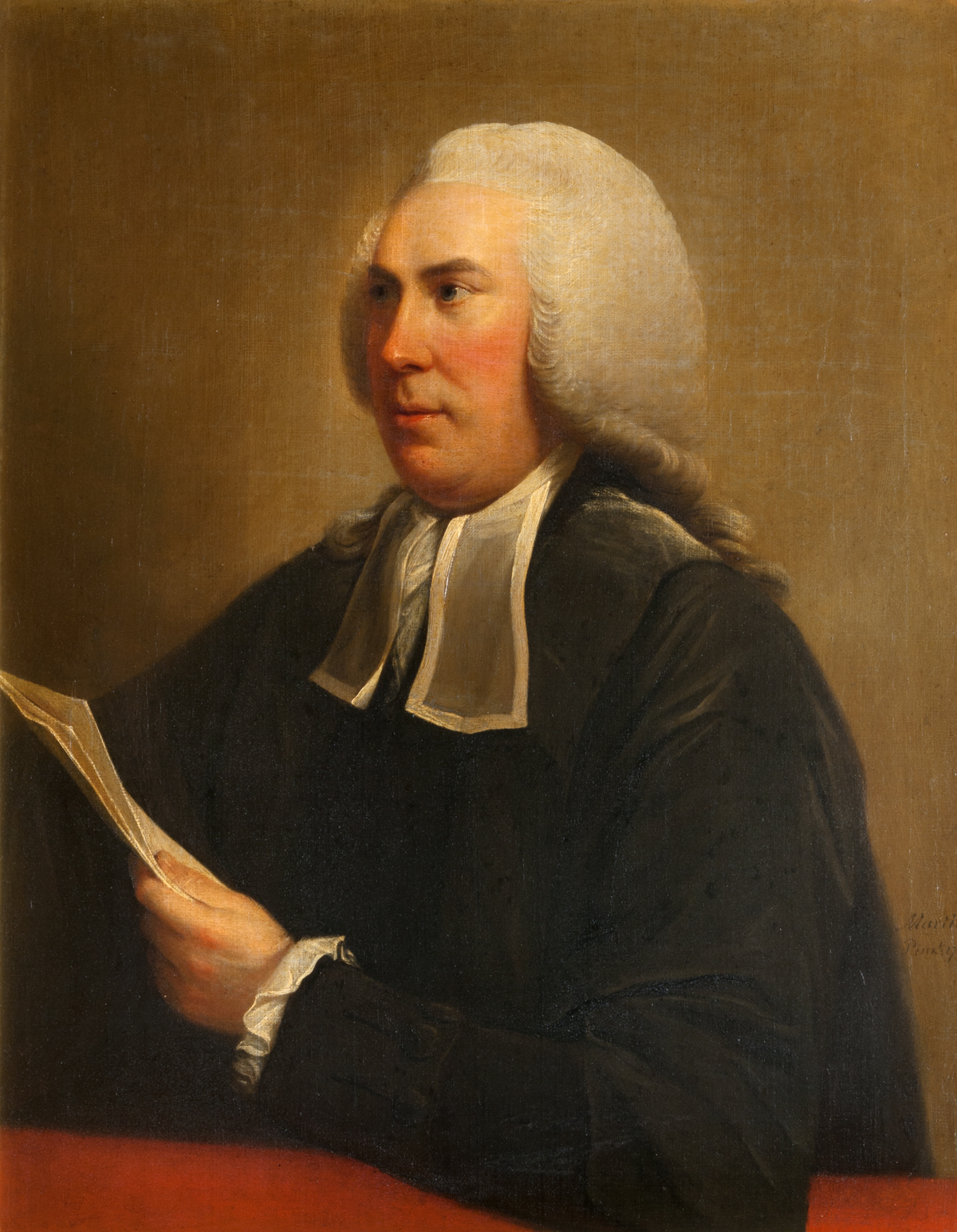
Alexander Murray, Lord Henderland, 1787 portrait by David Martin

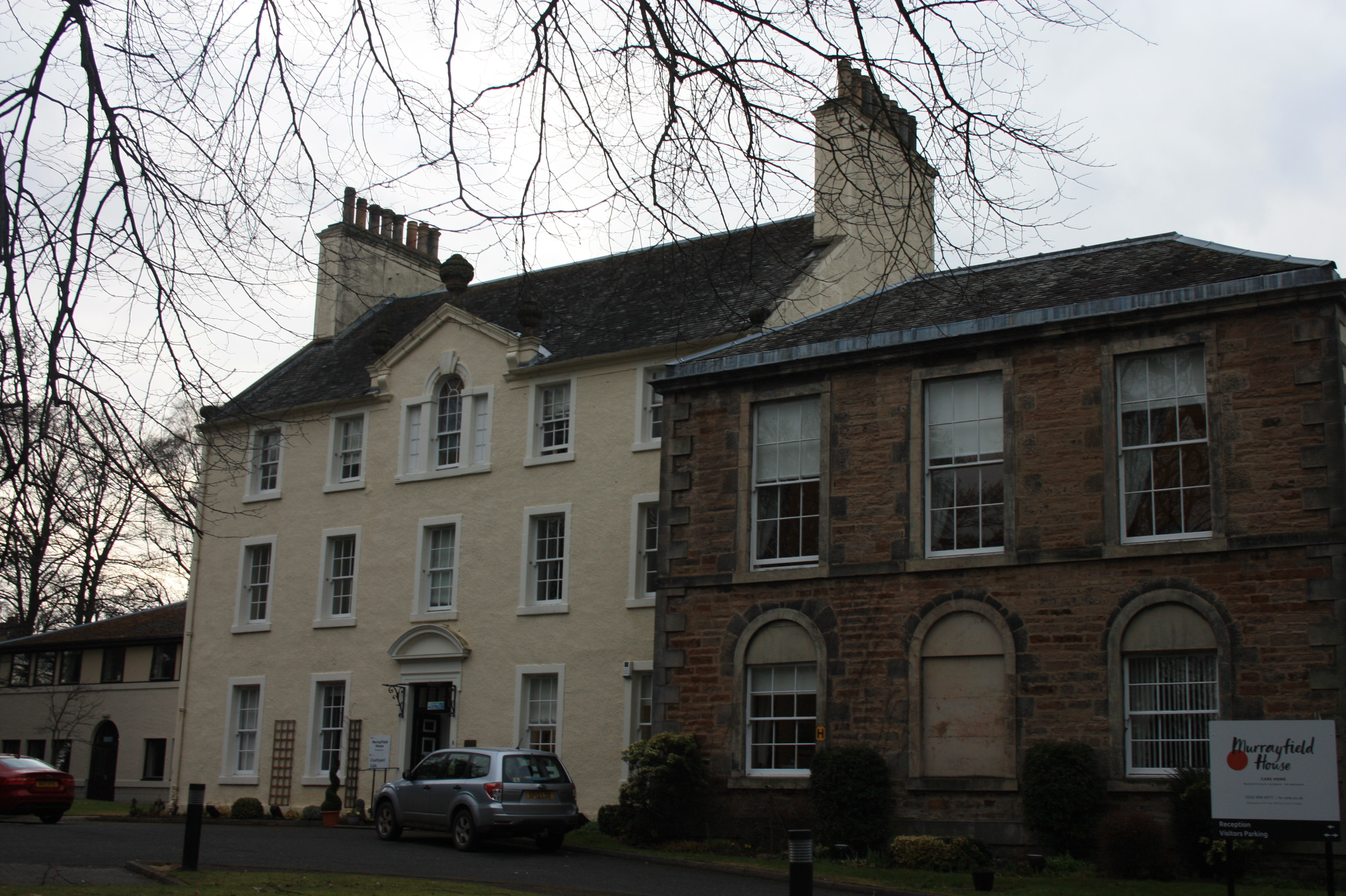
Murrayfield House, Edinburgh

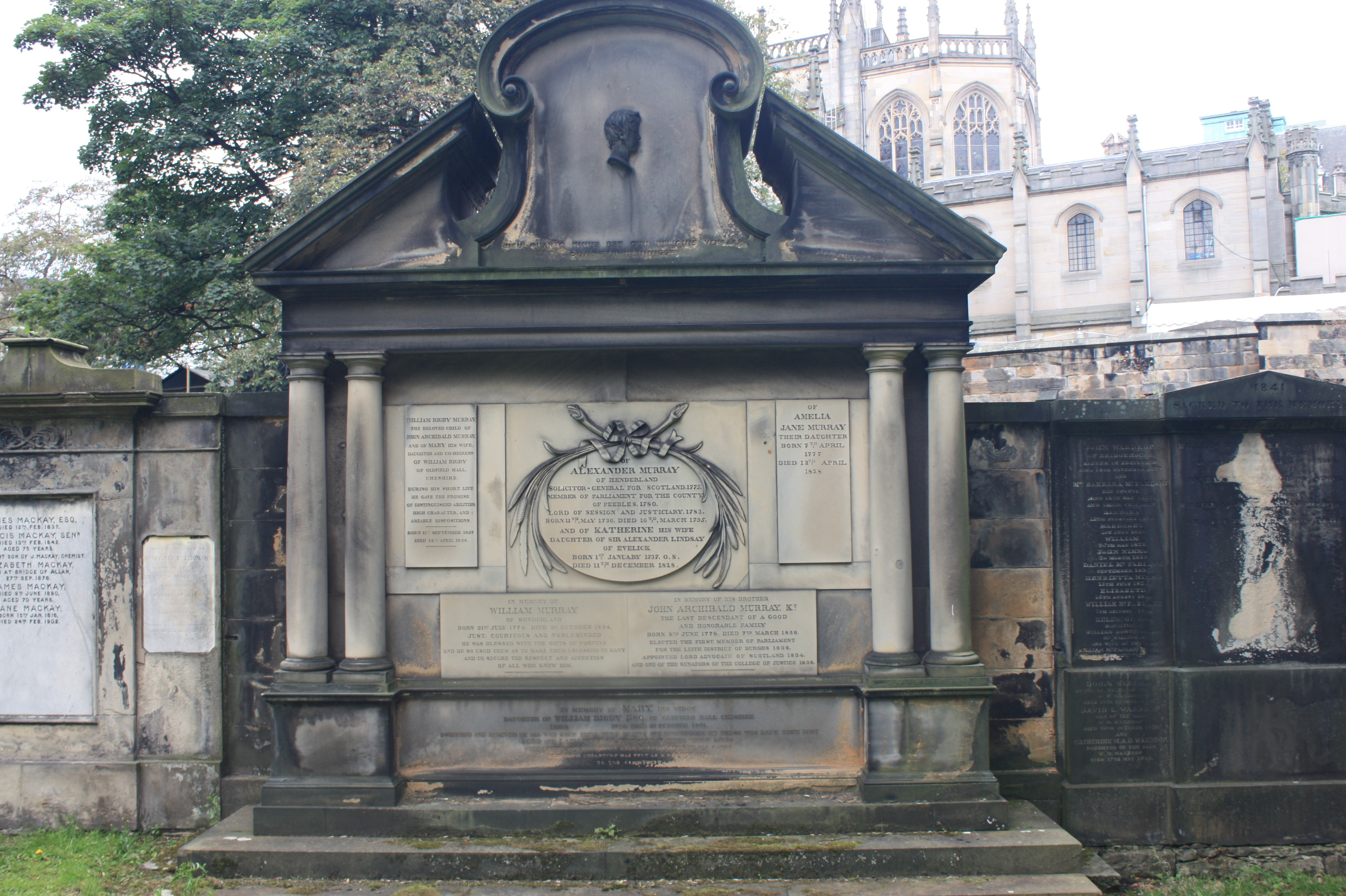
The monument to Lord Henderland, St Cuthberts, Edinburgh

== Life ==
Born at Murrayfield House west of Edinburgh's Old Town on 11 May 1736, he was the son of Archibald Murray of Cringletie, an advocate.

He studied law at the University of Edinburgh, and was called to the Scottish bar on 7 March 1758, and succeeded his father as sheriff-depute of Peebles in 1761, and as one of the commissaries of Edinburgh in 1765.

He inherited the estate of Henderland in Dumfries and Galloway around 1760.

On 24 May 1775 Murray was appointed solicitor-general for Scotland, and at the general election in September 1780 was returned to the House of Commons for Peeblesshire. The only speech he is recorded to have made in parliament was in opposition to Sir George Savile's motion relating to the petition of the delegated counties for a redress of grievances.

Murray succeeded Henry Home, Lord Kames, as an ordinary lord of session and a commissioner of the court of justiciary, and took his seat on the bench with the title of Lord Henderland on 6 March 1783. He took part in the trials for sedition at Edinburgh in 1793, and died of cholera at Murrayfield on 16 March 1795.

He is buried in St Cuthberts Churchyard in Edinburgh, beneath a huge monument, to the north side of the church.

== Recognition ==
The district of Murrayfield takes the name of his family, as does the street name of Henderland Road within that district.

== Works ==
Murray's Disputatio Juridica . . . de Divortiis et Repudiis was published in 1758 (Edinburgh).

== Family ==
On 15 March 1773 he married Katherine Lindsay (1737-1828), daughter of Sir Alexander Lindsay, 3rd Baronet of Evelick, Perthshire. Their children included Sir John Archibald Murray, Lord Murray. Henderland was joint clerk of the pipe in the court of exchequer, an office which, through the influence of Lord Melville, was subsequently conferred on his two sons.

His sister Susan married Sir Ilay Campbell.

== Notes ==
Attribution

This article incorporates text from a publication now in the public domain: Lee, Sidney, ed. (1894). "Murray, Alexander (1736-1795)". Dictionary of National Biography. Vol. 39. London: Smith, Elder & Co.

Legal offices
| Preceded by Henry Dundas | Solicitor General for Scotland; 1775 – 1783 | Succeeded by Ilay Campbell & Alexander Wight |
Parliament of Great Britain
| Preceded by Sir Robert Murray Keith | Member of Parliament for Peeblesshire; 1780 – 1783 | Succeeded by Alexander Murray |
