= 1879 in Scotland =

- Centuries: 17th; 18th; 19th; 20th; 21st
- Decades: 1850s; 1860s; 1870s; 1880s; 1890s
- See also: List of years in Scotland; Timeline of Scottish history 1879 in: The UK • Wales • Elsewhere; Scottish football: 1878–79 • 1879–80

Events from the year 1879 in Scotland.

== Incumbents ==
=== Law officers ===
- Lord Advocate – William Watson
- Solicitor General for Scotland – John Macdonald

=== Judiciary ===
- Lord President of the Court of Session and Lord Justice General – Lord Glencorse
- Lord Justice Clerk – Lord Moncreiff

== Events ==
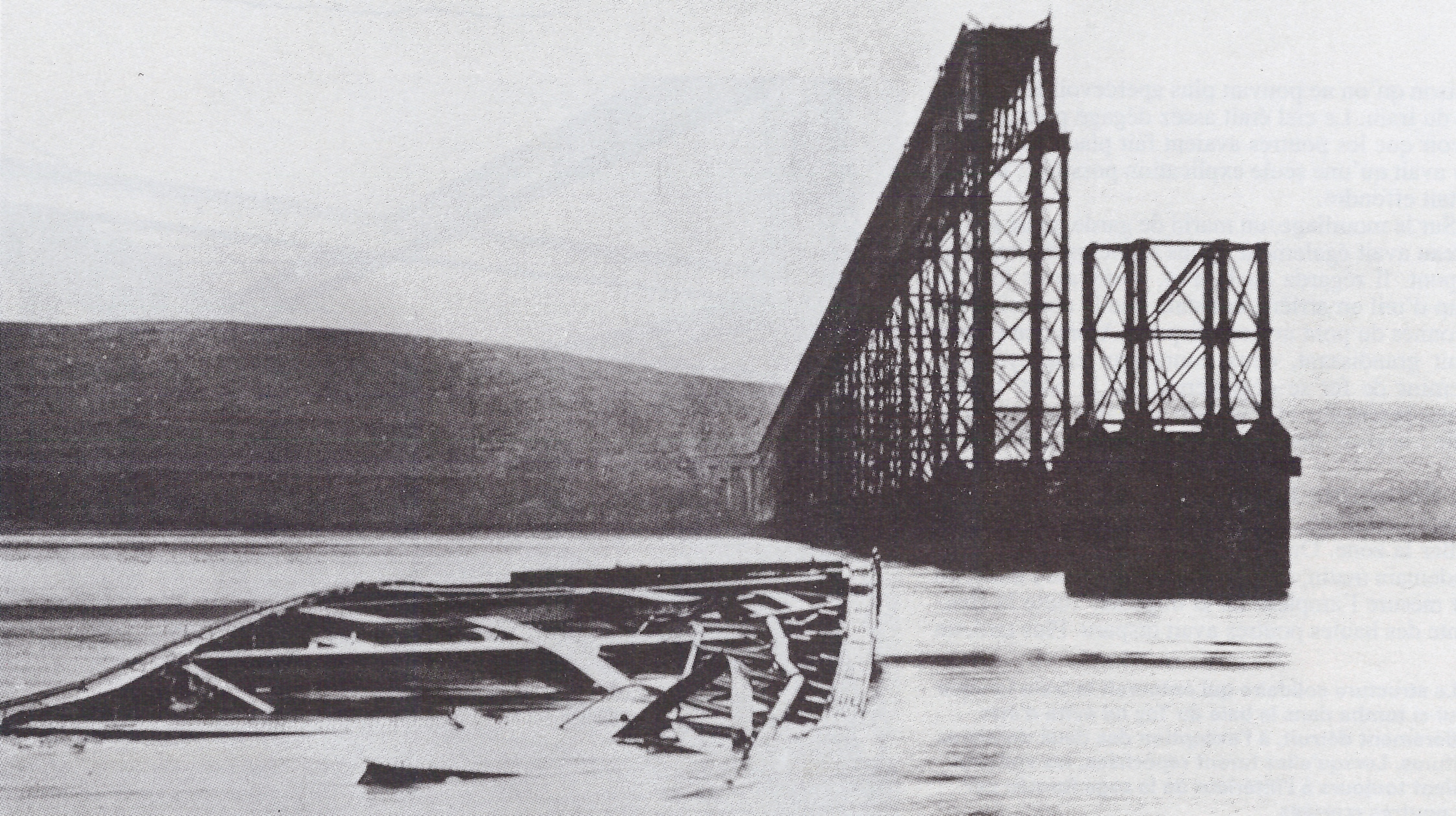
Tay Bridge disaster

- 4 January – Dundee-born Mormon missionary Hugh Findlay arrives in Shetland from the United States and on 31 March baptizes the islands' first two converts.
- 25 January – first service held in St Mary's Cathedral, Edinburgh (Episcopal) on completion of the nave.
- 1 April – Dundee Stock Exchange established.
- 6 June – William Denny and Brothers launch the world's first ocean-going steamer to be built of mild steel, the SS Rotomahana, at Dumbarton.
- 31 July – the Caledonian Railway opens the original Glasgow Central station.
- 30 September – foundation stone of the Forth Bridge is laid on Inchgarvie.
- 2 October – William Denny and Brothers launch the world's first transatlantic steamer to be built of mild steel, the SS Buenos Ayrean, at Dumbarton. On 1 December she makes her maiden voyage out of Glasgow for South America.
- 28 December – the Tay Bridge disaster: the central part of the new Tay Bridge at Dundee collapses in a storm as a train passes over it, killing 78.
- Construction of Garnethill Synagogue, Glasgow, the oldest to survive in Scotland, begins.
- Royal Infirmary of Edinburgh moves to Lauriston Place.
- First Angus cattle society formed.

== Births ==
- 13 January – William Reid Dick, sculptor (died 1961 in England)
- 16 January – Jimmy Gillespie, rugby union player (died 1943)
- 27 March – Catherine Carswell, née Catherine Roxburgh Macfarlane, author (died 1946 in England)
- 29 March – Evelyn Vida Baxter, ornithologist (died 1959)
- 24 August – John Maclean, Marxist (died 1923)
- 13 September – Tommy Tait, international footballer (died 1942)
- 21 October – Willie Anderson, golfer (died 1910 in the United States)
- 23 October – John MacDougall Hay, Church of Scotland minister and novelist (died 1919)
- John Maxwell, film producer (died 1940 in England)
- Henry J. Watt, experimental psychologist (died 1925)

== Deaths ==
- 19 June – James Valentine, photographer (born 1815)
- 23 July – Charles Baillie, Lord Jerviswoode, advocate, judge and politician (born 1804)
- 29 October – John Blackwood, publisher (born 1818)
- 5 November – James Clerk Maxwell, theoretical physicist (born 1831; died of abdominal cancer in Cambridge)
- 23 November – Mark Napier, lawyer, sheriff, biographer and historical author (born 1798)

== The arts ==
- 6 September – first publication of a story by Arthur Conan Doyle, "The Mystery of Sasassa Valley" in Chambers's Journal.
- Construction of Royalty Theatre, Glasgow, completed.

== See also ==
- Timeline of Scottish history
- 1879 in Ireland
