= Galashiels Baptist Church =

Church in Scottish Borders, Scotland

Coordinates: 55.617807°N 2.816818°W

Galashiels Baptist Church is located in the town of Galashiels, Scottish Borders, Scotland, UK. It was founded in 1804 and is affiliated to the Baptist Union of Scotland.

== History ==
Galashiels Baptist Church had its beginnings with three men: Archibald Cochrane, Henry Watson, and William Johnstone who in 1782 met together for worship, prayer, praise, the reading of the scriptures, exhortation, and collection for the poor and in support of the profession of Christianity.

Over the years their numbers increased and in 1804 the congregation in Galashiels had grown to the point where the worshippers resolved to form themselves into an independent Baptist congregation.

Initially the congregation met in the Cloth Hall, eventually a place of worship was built at the West end of Overhaugh Street.

In 1841 the congregation, having outgrown its premises in Overhaugh Street, resolved to enlarge its place of meeting, and ground was bought at the top of Stirling Street. The new chapel was duly erected, with the deeds showing it to be in the name of Mr James Leitch (elder) and Messrs Johnstone, Rutherford & Paterson (deacons) and their successors in office

In 1868, with a membership of 99, the church was forced to move out of its premises and into the lower room of the public hall.

Discussions took place as to whether the existing chapel should be extended or a new chapel constructed. At an estimated cost of £1000, the congregation elected to build a new chapel on ground belonging to the existing chapel in Stirling Street. The new chapel in Stirling Street was opened in 1870.

In 1875, having been formed along Scottish Baptist principles, which argued for the plurality of pastors, many within the church began to feel that this no longer satisfied the needs of the congregation. As this was agreed by the majority of those meeting in Stirling Street, The Rev. Charles Hill of Dunfermline was called as the first full-time paid pastor.

Those who disagreed with this change in principles left the church and continued to meet along the Scottish Baptist lines in the Bridge Place Hall.

In 1880, Mr James Brown, a blacksmith from Selkirk, and 19 others left the fellowship in Galashiels to form a Baptist church in Selkirk. Within their second year, the numbers meeting in Selkirk had risen to 54.

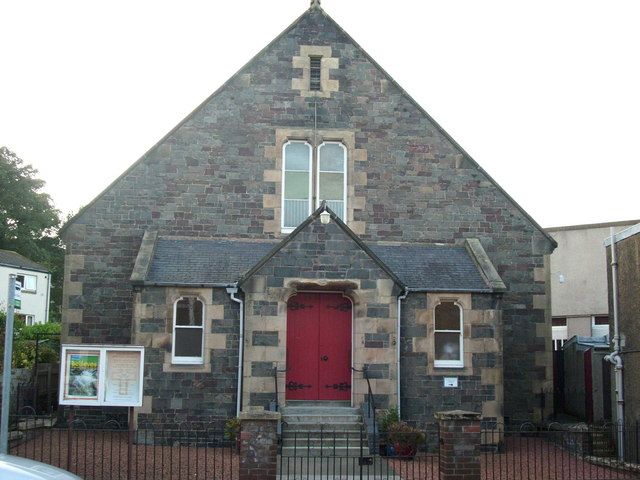
The Baptist Church, Victoria Street

In 1882, with the help of a loan from the Baptist Union of Scotland, the present building in Victoria Street was built at a cost of £745, to house the Scottish Baptist congregation from Bridge Place.

In 1903, the first hall, a wood and iron building capable of seating 150 was erected behind the Victoria Street church.

The following year the two congregations in Galashiels came together for the Centenary celebrations. The celebrations took the form of a Social evening on 11 November at the public hall, preceded by a fortnights evangelistic meetings conducted by Rev Joseph Kemp (Charlotte Chapel, Edinburgh).

1939 saw the hall of the Stirling Street building in use as a war time canteen and storage facility.

In 1960, the two churches, recognising the problems caused by population shifts away from the town centre, sought to have a joint evangelistic programme and in 1971 a period of shared ministry was undertaken by the two congregations.

This led in 1972 to the joint deacons court recommending the formation of a new joint fellowship. The new church was to be called The Galashiels Baptist Church. Committees were formed to look at the issues of property and the pastoral vacancy.

That same year saw the Rev Ian Mundie called from Mosspark to become the first pastor of the joint fellowship.

In 1976, after much discussion, it was finally agreed that the joint fellowship should make its home at the Victoria Street premises. Up to this point both premises had been in use for various purposes.

1993 saw the calling made to the Rev Andrew Sinclair to become pastor of the fellowship following completion of his studies in Glasgow. He remained as Pastor until 2006 when he retired. To date the church has remained in a period of vacancy.

In 2004 the church celebrated its 200th year of witnessing for Christ to the people of Galashiels and beyond. A year of events were staged in Galashiels that included Christian entertainers such as Adrian Plass, Syd Little, and the Riding Lights Theatre Company.

In 2006 the Rev Andrew Sinclair retired as Pastor. There followed a period of reflection until 2009 when a vacancy committee was appointed resulting in the calling of Rev Arthur Hembling as Pastor of the fellowship in 2010.

In 2012 the church underwent a refurbishment to the sanctuary, lounge and vestibule, with the removal of the pews and levelling of the sanctuary floor, creating a more usable space for church activities.
