= Joseph Grant (poet) =

Scottish poet (1805–1835)

- Born: 26 May 1805; Kincardineshire, Scotland
- Died: 14 April 1835 (aged 29); Affrusk
- Occupation: Poet
- Parent(s): Robert Grant; Isabel Grant

Joseph Grant (26 May 1805 – 14 April 1835) was a Scottish poet.

== Life ==
Grant was born 26 May 1805 at his father's farm of Affrusk in Kincardineshire. As a child he was employed on the farm in the summer, and during the winter picked up what learning he could at a village school. When only fourteen he began to write verses. In 1831 he was engaged as assistant to a shopkeeper at Stonehaven, and afterwards was employed as a clerk at Dundee, first in the office of the Guardian newspaper, and then in that of a writer to the signet. He died 14 April 1835 at Affrusk.

There is a memorial to him in the graveyard at Strachan, Aberdeenshire 'Erected by his father and mother, Robert and Isabel Grant'. It is inscribed 'In memory of Joseph Grant, author of Tales of the Glens and other pieces in prose and verse, who died 14 April 1835 aged 30 years'.

== Works ==
Grant's poems were mainly written in Scots, but some are in English. Besides tales and sketches contributed to Chambers's Journal between 1830 and 1835, he published:

- 'Juvenile Lays,'; 1828.
- 'Kincardineshire Traditions,' 1830, in verse.

At the time of his death he was preparing Tales of the Glens: with Ballads and Songs. This collection was published in 1836, 'with a memoir of the author by R. Nicoll.'
