= Peter Gray (writer) =

Scottish writer on life contingencies

Peter Gray (1807?–1887), was a Scottish writer on life contingencies.

== Life ==
Gray was born at Aberdeen about 1807, was educated at Gordon's Hospital, now Gordon's College, in that city, from which he was sent on account of his promise and industry for two years to Aberdeen University. Here he developed a taste for mathematics, and, with the sole desire to assist the studies of a friend, afterwards took a special interest in the study of life contingencies. He became an honorary member of the Institute of Actuaries, and his contributions to the ‘Journal’ of that society were numerous and valuable. He undertook, purely as a labour of love, the task of organising and preparing for publication the tables deduced from the mortality experience issued by the institute. Gray specially constructed for Part I. of the ‘Institute Text Book’ an extensive table of values of log 10 (1 + i), appending thereto an interesting note on the calculations.

He was a fellow of the Royal Astronomical Society and Royal Microscopical Society, and was distinguished by his knowledge of optics and of applied mechanics. Gray died on 17 January 1887, in his eightieth year.

== Works ==
With Henry Ambrose Smith and William Orchard, Gray published ‘Assurance and Annuity Tables, according to the Carlisle Rate of Mortality, at three per cent.,’ 8vo, London, 1851, and contributed a preliminary notice to William Orchard's ‘Single and Annual Assurance Premiums for every value of Annuity,’ 8vo, London, 1856. His separate writings are: 1. ‘Tables and Formulæ for the Computation of Life Contingencies; with copious Examples of Annuity, Assurance, and Friendly Society Calculations,’ 8vo, London, 1849. 2. ‘Remarks on a Problem in Life Contingencies,’ 8vo, London, 1850. 3. ‘Tables for the Formation of Logarithms and Anti-Logarithms to twelve Places; with explanatory Introduction,’ 8vo, London, 1865; another edition, 8vo, London, 1876.
