= 1877 in Scotland =

- Centuries: 17th; 18th; 19th; 20th; 21st
- Decades: 1850s; 1860s; 1870s; 1880s; 1890s
- See also: List of years in Scotland; Timeline of Scottish history 1877 in: The UK • Wales • Elsewhere; Scottish football: 1876–77 • 1877–78

Events from the year 1877 in Scotland.

== Incumbents ==
=== Law officers ===
- Lord Advocate – William Watson
- Solicitor General for Scotland – John Macdonald

=== Judiciary ===
- Lord President of the Court of Session and Lord Justice General – Lord Glencorse
- Lord Justice Clerk – Lord Moncreiff

== Events ==
- 24 April – six Scotch whisky distilleries combine to form Distillers Company.
- 16 October – the Abertay light vessel is moored on station off Dundee, Scotland's first lightvessel.
- 22 October – Blantyre mining disaster: Scotland's worst-ever mining accident kills over 200.
- 3 December – the original Mount Stuart House on the Isle of Bute is burned down.
- Ex-President of the United States Ulysses S. Grant tours his ancestral Scotland.
- The rebuilt Ardverikie House in Badenoch, designed by John Rhind, is completed.
- Cluny Harbour at Buckie is built.
- Wick Harbour breakwater is washed away in a storm for a second time.
- Mitchell Library established in Glasgow.
- Manufacture of linoleum at Kirkcaldy begins.
- Separate U.K. Ayrshire cattle and Galloway cattle societies established and herd books set up.
- A breed register for the Clydesdale horse is established.

== Births ==
- 25 February – John Tait Robertson, international footballer (died 1935)
- 12 May – William Weir, 1st Viscount Weir, industrialist and politician (died 1959)
- 7 August – Leslie Hunter, born George Hunter, painter (died 1931)
- 9 November – Helen Crawfurd, suffragette and communist activist (died 1954)
- 26 November – Sir John Stewart, 1st Baronet, of Fingask, whisky distiller (suicide 1924)

== Deaths ==
- 2 January – Alexander Bain, inventor (born 1810)
- 3 February – James Merry, ironmaster, race-horse breeder and Liberal MP (1859–74) (born 1805)
- 14 April – Margaret Macpherson Grant, heiress and philanthropist (born 1834)

== The arts ==
- William McGonagall discovers himself to be a poet (according to his own account).
- Robert Louis Stevenson's first published works of fiction appear in magazines.

== See also ==
- Timeline of Scottish history
- 1877 in Ireland
