= Christopher Anderson (theologian) =

Theological writer and preacher (1782–1852)

Christopher Anderson (19 February 1782 – 18 February 1852) was a Scottish theological writer and preacher.

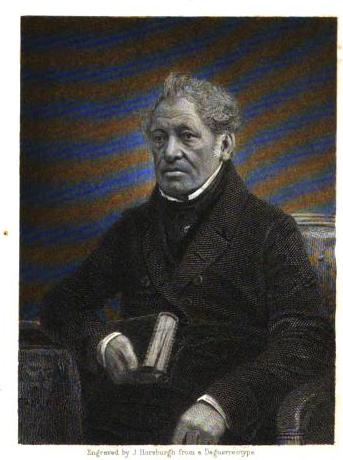
Christopher Anderson, engraving by John Horsburgh from a daguerreotype

== Biography ==
He was born at Edinburgh, 19 February 1782, the son of William Anderson, a merchant. He began life in an insurance office, but gave up his secular work and studied for the ministry, with the aim of becoming a missionary: his background was formed by followers of Robert and James Haldane. Weak health prevented his accepting a missionary appointment, and he then became minister of a small congregation in Edinburgh, known as "English Baptists", at the Charlotte Chapel. He held this post until shortly before his death.

Anderson was interested in the Scottish Highlands, and was a founder of the Gaelic School Society. He established the independent Edinburgh Bible Society. He supported the Serampore mission in India, travelled to explain its objects, and collected funds on its behalf.

Anderson died on 18 February 1852. New York University would have sent him a diploma, but he refused it. At his death he left a collection of early English bibles.

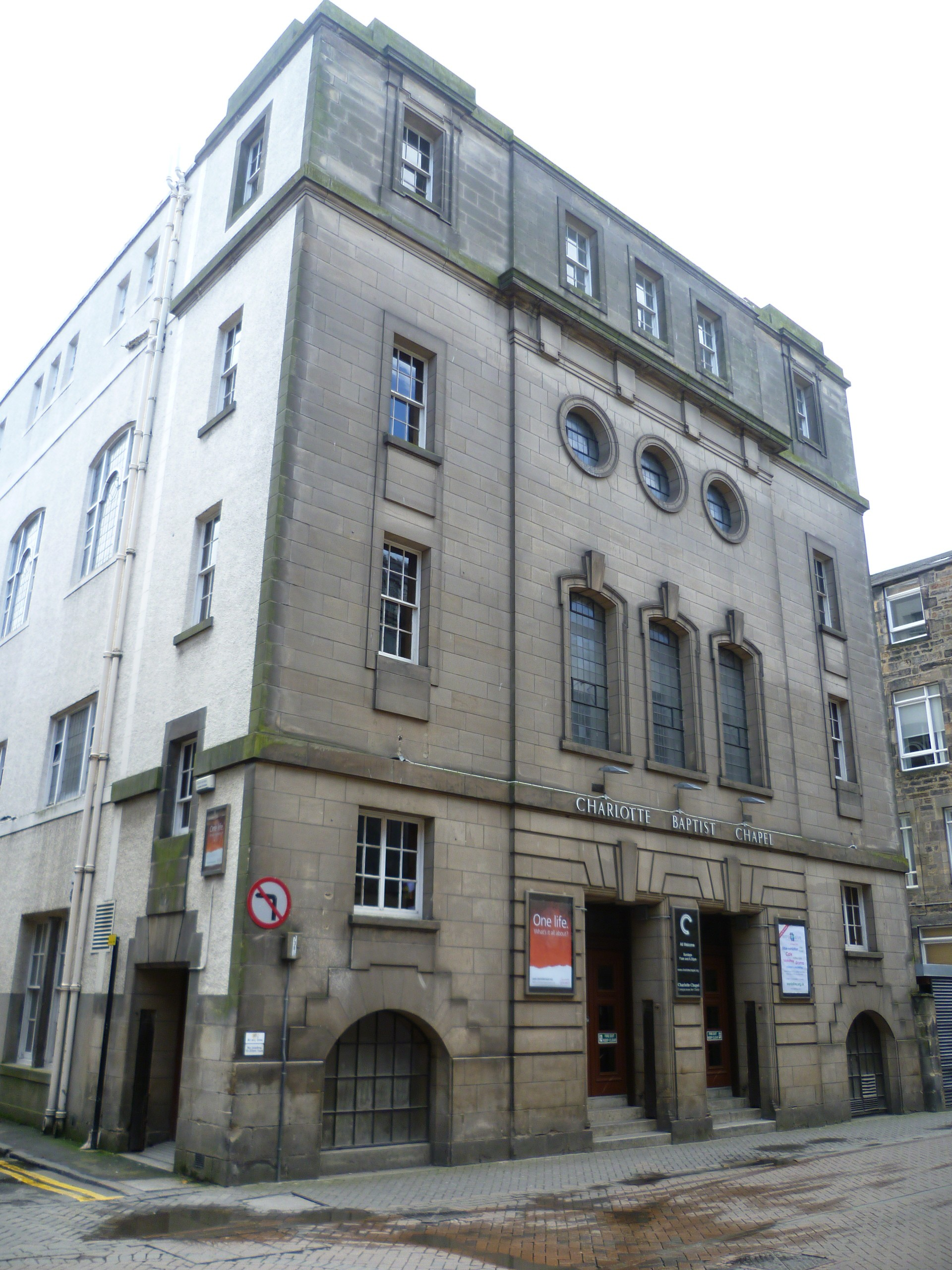
Charlotte Chapel, Edinburgh today

== Works ==
Anderson published two memorials on the diffusion of the Scriptures in the Celtic languages; and, in 1828, a volume of Historical Sketches of the Native Irish. His major work was the Annals of the English Bible. It is now regarded as ethnocentric.

On 4 October 1835, the tercentary of the publication of the first complete English Bible by Myles Coverdale, Anderson published a sermon on The English Scriptures, their first reception and effects, including Memorials of Tyndale, Frith, Coverdale, and Rogers. He then undertook his extensive Annals, written from 1837 to 1845, when it was published in two volumes.

Another of Anderson's publications was The Domestic Constitution, on Christian family life.
