= 1880 in Scotland =

- Centuries: 17th; 18th; 19th; 20th; 21st
- Decades: 1860s; 1870s; 1880s; 1890s; 1900s
- See also: List of years in Scotland; Timeline of Scottish history 1880 in: The UK • Wales • Elsewhere; Scottish football: 1879–80 • 1880–81

Events from the year 1880 in Scotland.

== Incumbents ==
=== Law officers ===
- Lord Advocate – William Watson until May; then John McLaren
- Solicitor General for Scotland – John Macdonald; then John Blair Balfour

=== Judiciary ===
- Lord President of the Court of Session and Lord Justice General – Lord Glencorse
- Lord Justice Clerk – Lord Moncreiff

== Events ==
- February – telephones introduced in Edinburgh.
- 27 April – 1880 United Kingdom general election: The Liberal Party defeat the Conservatives by a substantial majority following the 'Midlothian campaign' by William Ewart Gladstone who is returned as Member of Parliament for Midlothian and becomes Prime Minister of the United Kingdom.
- 1 July – the Callander and Oban Railway is opened throughout to Oban.
- October – the SS Ferret is fraudulently chartered at Greenock and taken to Australia.
- A. & R. Scott of Glasgow begin producing the predecessor of Scott's Porage Oats.

== Births ==
- 29 March – Bobby Templeton, footballer (died 1919)
- 4 April – William Russell Flint, watercolourist (died 1969)
- 30 April – Charles Exeter Devereux Crombie, cartoonist (died 1967)
- 6 May – Edmund Ironside, British Army officer (died 1959)
- 14 May – B. C. Forbes, financial journalist (died 1954 in the United States)
- 1 July – Noel Skelton, Unionist politician, journalist and intellectual (died 1935)
- 13 August – Mary Macarthur, trade unionist (died 1921)
- September – Peter Kyle, footballer (died 1961)
- 23 September – John Boyd Orr, physician and biologist, recipient of the Nobel Peace Prize (died 1971)
- 15 October – Marie Stopes, author, palaeobotanist, campaigner for women's rights and pioneer in the field of birth control (died 1958)
- 18 October – Alexander Livingstone, Liberal politician (died 1950)
- Margaret McCoubrey, suffragette and pacifist in Belfast (died 1955 in Northern Ireland)
- Dorothy Carleton Smyth, artist and designer (died 1933)
- Preston Watson, aviator (killed in military aviation accident 1915)

== Deaths ==
- 3 April – John Laing, bibliographer and Free Church minister (born 1809)
- 31 December – John Stenhouse, chemist (born 1809)

== Sport ==
- Scottish Grand National first run under this name.
- 1870s Rangers F.C. seasons
- 1879–80 Heart of Midlothian F.C. season
- 1879–80 Hibernian F.C. season
- 1879–80 Scottish Cup
- 1880 Open Championship
- 1880–81 Scottish Cup
- 1880–81 Heart of Midlothian F.C. season
- 1880–81 Hibernian F.C. season

=== Establishments ===
- Dykehead F.C.
- East Craigie F.C.
- Forth Corinthian Yacht Club
- Parkhead F.C.
- Port Glasgow Athletic F.C.
- Selkirk F.C.
- Strachur and District Shinty Club

== The arts ==
- William McGonagall produces his doggerel poem "The Tay Bridge Disaster" to commemorate the previous December's Tay Bridge disaster.

== See also ==
- Timeline of Scottish history
- 1880 in Ireland
