= Richard Gall =

Scottish poet

Richard Gall (1776–1801), was a Scottish poet.

Gall, the son of a notary, was born at Linkhouse, near Dunbar, in December 1776. Having attended the parish school of Haddington, he was apprenticed at the age of eleven to his maternal uncle, a carpenter, and builder. He afterward became a printer's apprentice in Edinburgh, and there he gave his leisure to study. He then became travelling clerk to a Mr. Ramsay, in whose employment he remained till his death, 10 May 1801. His powers attracted considerable attention during his lifetime, and he enjoyed the friendship of Burns and Thomas Campbell. Several of his songs were set to music and became popular. Two of these, 'The Farewell to Ayrshire,’ and 'Now bank and brae are clad in green,’ were falsely assigned to Burns; the former was sent by Gall to Johnson's 'Scots Poetical Museum,’ with Burns's name prefixed, and the latter appeared in Cromek's 'Reliques of Burns.' An edition of Gall's 'Poems and Songs' was published at Edinburgh in 1819.
