= John Laing (bibliographer) =

John Laing (1809 – 3 April 1880) was a minister of the Free Church of Scotland, known as a bibliographer.

== Life ==
He was born in Edinburgh, but spent his early youth at Dalmeny, where his father was for factor to the Earl of Rosebery; his mother was Mary Fyfe, of a Banffshire family. After taking the course at Edinburgh University in arts and theology, he was, in 1842, ordained assistant and successor to John M. Robertson, minister of Livingston, Linlithgowshire. At the disruption of 1843 he withdrew from the establishment, joined the newly formed Free Church, and for a time continued his ministry in the same parish.

On 29 August 1843, he married at Livingston, Catherine Fyfe, daughter of a West India proprietor, and had three daughters, the eldest of whom predeceased him.

In 1846 Laing became chaplain to the Presbyterian soldiers at Gibraltar and afterwards at Malta. Failing health, together with a reluctance to appear in public, caused him to resign his charge. In 1850, he was appointed librarian at New College, Edinburgh, where his work in bibliography began. He died on 3 April 1880.

== Works ==
Laing published the Catalogue of the Printed Books and Manuscripts in the Library of New College, Edinburgh, 1868.

After the death of Samuel Halkett in 1871, the materials Halkett had collected for a dictionary of anonymous literature were given to Laing, who more than doubled the collection. He died before the work went to press; with the exception of the indices, it was arranged and edited by his elder surviving daughter, and appeared in four volumes entitled A Dictionary of Anonymous and Pseudonymous Literature of Great Britain, between 1882 and 1888.

== Attribution ==
This article incorporates text from a publication now in the public domain: "Laing, John (1809-1880)". Dictionary of National Biography. London: Smith, Elder & Co. 1885–1900.
