= 1876 in Scotland =

- Centuries: 17th; 18th; 19th; 20th; 21st
- Decades: 1850s; 1860s; 1870s; 1880s; 1890s
- See also: List of years in Scotland; Timeline of Scottish history 1876 in: The UK • Wales • Elsewhere; Scottish football: 1875–76 • 1876–77

Events from the year 1876 in Scotland.

== Incumbents ==
=== Law officers ===
- Lord Advocate – Edward Strathearn Gordon until July; then William Watson
- Solicitor General for Scotland – William Watson; then John Macdonald

=== Judiciary ===
- Lord President of the Court of Session and Lord Justice General – Lord Glencorse
- Lord Justice Clerk – Lord Moncreiff

== Events ==
- 14 February – Alexander Graham Bell files a patent for the telephone in the United States.
- 19 February – Partick Thistle F.C. play their first match.
- 5 April – River Dee Ferry Boat Disaster: 32 drown.
- 18 June – promenade on the roof of Waverley Market opens in Edinburgh; this year also West Princes Street Gardens pass to the city's council as a public park.
- 17 October – St Enoch railway station officially opens in Glasgow.
- 3 November – McLean Museum opens in Greenock.
- William Forbes Skene's Celtic Scotland: a History of Ancient Alban begins publication in Edinburgh.
- Camp Coffee is first produced by Paterson & Sons Ltd in Glasgow.

== Births ==
- 23 March – Muirhead Bone, etcher (died 1953)
- 13 April – Robert Smyth McColl, footballer and retail store founder (died 1959)
- 19 June – Nigel Gresley, steam locomotive designer (died 1941)
- 6 September – John James Rickard Macleod, physician and physiologist, Nobel Prize laureate (died 1935)
- 3 October – Thomas Haining Gillespie, founder of the Royal Zoological Society of Scotland and Edinburgh Zoo (died 1967)
- 22 October – Cecilia Loftus, born Marie Cecilia Loftus Brown, actress in music hall and legitimate theatre (died 1943 in the United States)
- 4 November – Donald Cameron, 25th Lochiel, soldier and Chief of the Name (died 1951)
- 7 November – Alex Smith, international footballer (died 1954)
- 17 December – Archibald Main, ecclesiastical historian (died 1947)
- 18 December – Henry Wade, surgeon (died 1955)
- Joseph Lee, poet and journalist (died 1949)

== Deaths ==
- 9 January – Thomas Hill Jamieson, librarian (born 1843)
- 22 January – Sir George Harvey, genre painter (born 1806)
- 3 February – Benjamin Connor, steam locomotive designer (born 1813)
- 24 April – Henry Dübs, steam locomotive manufacturer (born 1816 in Germany)
- 7 May – David Bryce, architect (born 1803)
- 23 June – Robert Napier, engineer, "Father of Clyde Shipbuilding" (born 1791)
- 23 December – Charles Neaves, Lord Neaves, judge and poet (born 1800)

== See also ==
- Timeline of Scottish history
- 1876 in Ireland
