= Robert McQueen, Lord Braxfield =

Scottish advocate and judge

Lord Braxfield
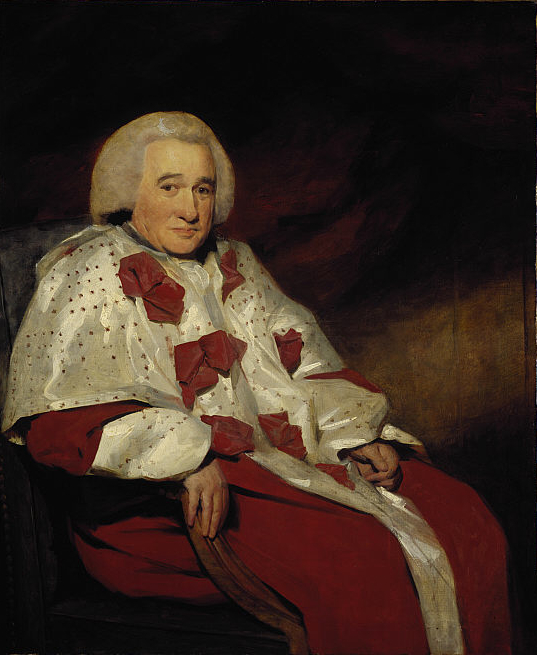
- Lord Braxfield

Lord Justice Clerk
- In office 13 December 1776 – 30 May 1799

Personal details
- Born: 4 May 1722 Lanark
- Died: 30 May 1799 (aged 77) George Square, Edinburgh
- Spouse(s): Mary Agnew; Elizabeth Ord
- Education: University of Edinburgh
- Profession: Advocate

Robert McQueen, Lord Braxfield (4 May 1722 – 30 May 1799) was a Scottish advocate and judge.

== Life ==
McQueen was born at Braxfield House near Lanark on 4 May 1722, son of John McQueen.

He studied law at Edinburgh University and was admitted to the Faculty of Advocates in 1744. In 1759 he was appointed an Advocate Depute appearing for the Crown in prosecutions. He often appeared in more than 15 cases per day and earned £1900 in a single year.

He became a judge in 1776 and took the title Lord Braxfield.

In 1788 he became Lord Justice Clerk, the second most senior judge in Scotland. Explicitly taking the view that "Government in this country is made up of the landed interest, which alone has a right to be represented" he took an active role in the suppression of the Friends of the People Society in the trials and sentences passed on Thomas Muir and others. To accomplish this he "invented a crime of unconscious sedition". A famous quote of his in this respect was "Let them bring me prisoners, and I will find them law."

In 1795 he oversaw the trial and imprisonment of Sir Archibald Gordon Kinloch of Gilmerton for the murder of his half-brother Sir Francis Kinloch. This rare event saw one man kill another at least in part to inherit his baronetcy.

He died at home in George Square, Edinburgh, on 30 May 1799, aged 77, and was buried in the family vault at Lanark on 5 June. After his death his widow moved from George Square to 97 Princes Street.

Braxfield House was later the home of Robert Owen and New Lanark was built nearby.

== Family ==
He married, firstly, Mary Agnew, daughter of Major James Agnew of the 7th Dragoon Guards, and niece of Sir Andrew Agnew of Lochnaw, Wigtownshire, bart. They had four children:

- Robert Dundas, who died on 5 August 1816,
- John, captain in the 28th regiment of foot, who died on 2 February 1837,
- Mary, who married in 1777 Sir William Honyman, Lord Armadale,
- Catherine, who married John Macdonald, chief of Clanranald, in 1786.

Lord Braxfield married secondly, Elizabeth Ord, daughter of Robert Ord, Lord Chief Baron of the Exchequer for Scotland. They had no further children.

== Influence ==
Sir Henry Raeburn painted his portrait shortly before his death.

Braxfield has a notoriety in Scotland, due to the harsh way that he dealt with those who appeared before him, most famously in telling a defendant that "Ye're a vera clever chiel, man, but ye wad be nane the waur o' a hanging". In a recent survey of Scottish historians, Braxfield was identified as one of the "vilest villains" in Scotland's history.

He is thought to be the model for the judge, Lord Weir, in Robert Louis Stevenson's unfinished novel Weir of Hermiston.

Braxfield Row in New Lanark is named after his estate.

He was Trustee for the University of Edinburgh and South Bridge.

Legal offices
Preceded by Thomas Miller	Lord Justice Clerk; 13 December 1776 – 30 May 1799	Succeeded by David Rae
