= Robert Dundas of Arniston =

Scottish judge

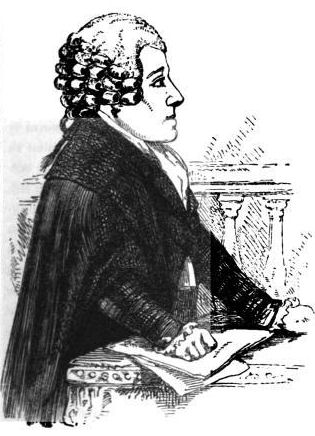

Chief Baron of the Exchequer
- In office 1801–1819
- Monarch: George III
- Preceded by: Sir James Montgomery
- Succeeded by: Sir Samuel Shepherd

Personal details
- Born: 6 June 1758
- Died: 17 June 1819 (aged 61)
- Spouse: Elizabeth Dundas (m. 1787)
- Children: 5
- Parent(s): Robert Dundas of Arniston, the younger Jean Grant
- Education: University of Edinburgh

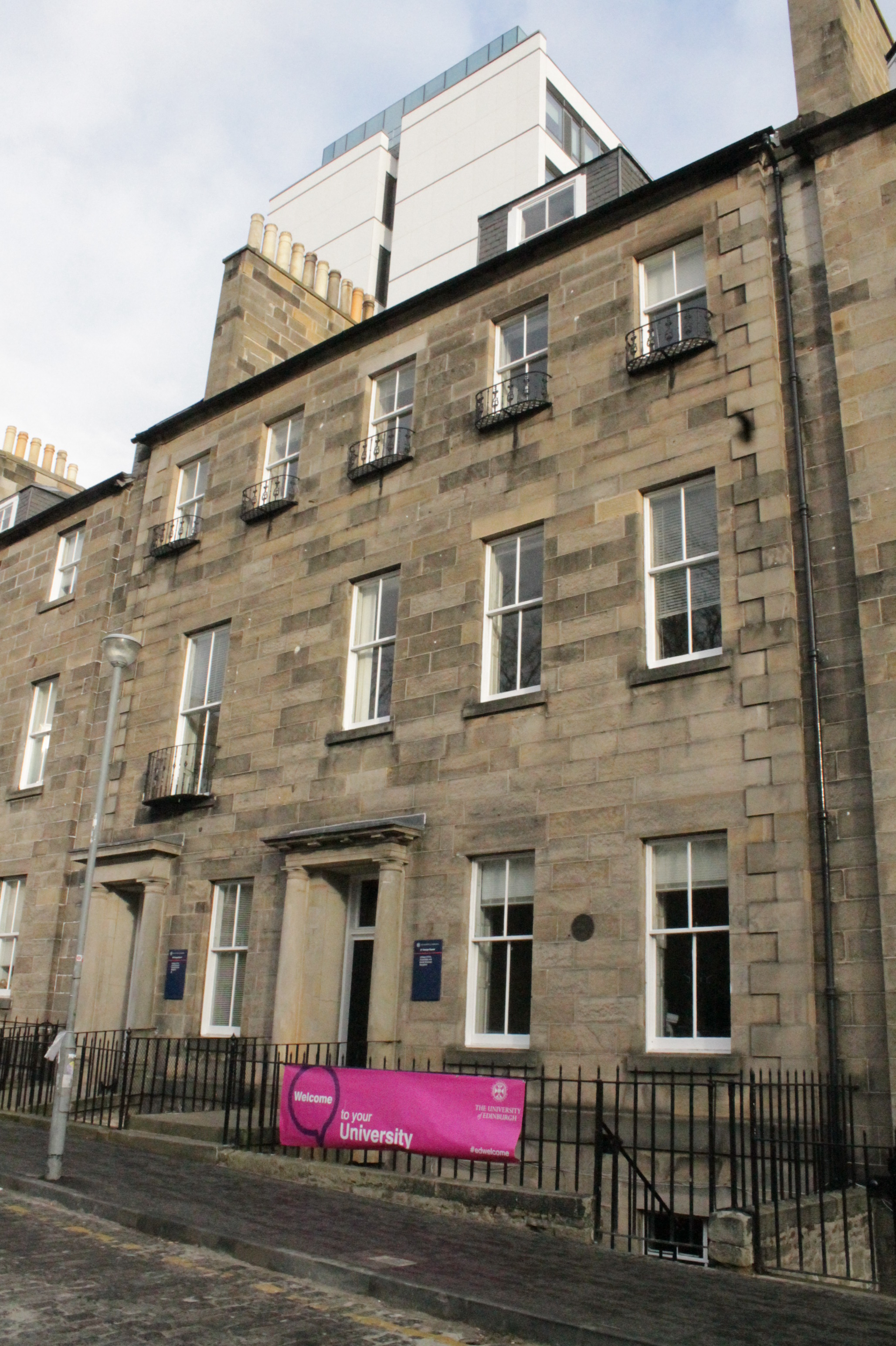
57.58 George Square in Edinburgh

Robert Dundas of Arniston (6 June 1758 – 17 June 1819) was a Scottish judge.

Dundas served as Solicitor General for Scotland between 1784 and 1789 and as Lord Advocate from 1789 to 1801. He sat as Member of Parliament for Edinburghshire from 1790 to 1801, and was Chief Baron of the Exchequer in Scotland from 1801 until his death in 1819.

== Life ==
Robert was born 6 June 1758 at Arniston House south of Edinburgh. He was the eldest son of Robert Dundas of Arniston, the younger and his second wife, Jean, daughter of William Grant, Lord Prestongrange. Around 1766 the family took additional accommodation at Adam's Court in Edinburgh. He was educated at the high school and the University of Edinburgh, and was admitted advocate in 1779. (Hamilton 1888, p. 195)

With the help of his uncle Henry Dundas, 1st Viscount Melville he succeeded Alexander Wight as Solicitor General for Scotland in 1784 and became lord advocate in 1789. At this time he was living at Adam Square near Greyfriars Kirk.

From 1790 to 1801 he was MP for Edinburghshire.

In June 1792 he was the cause and focus of the Dundas Riots, starting at his home in George Square. Following the riots he made it a personal aim to prosecute and effectively destroy the Edinburgh lawyer, Thomas Muir of Huntershill, who he saw as responsible for most of the seditious mischief.

He appeared for the crown in the great prosecutions for sedition at Edinburgh in 1793. In 1796 he was elected Dean of the Faculty of Advocates.

He was joint-clerk and keeper of the general registers for seisins and other writs in Scotland from 1799 until on 1 June 1801 he was appointed chief baron of the exchequer in Scotland, but in 1801 and 1811 he turned down offers of the lord presidency.

He died at his townhouse, 57 George Square, Edinburgh on 17 June 1819.

== Family ==
Part of a Scottish legal and political dynasty, Dundas was the son of Robert Dundas, of Arniston, the younger. His great-great-grandfather James Dundas, Lord Arniston (died 1679) and great-grandfather Robert Dundas, Lord Arniston had been MPs and judges, as were his grandfather Robert Dundas, of Arniston, the elder and his father Robert Dundas, of Arniston, the younger.

In May 1787 Robert Dundas married his first cousin, Elizabeth Dundas, daughter of his uncle Henry Dundas. Together they had two daughters and three sons. Elizabeth died 18 March 1852. His heir, Robert, who lived at 69 Queen Street in Edinburgh, died in 1838. Henry, the second son, was vice-admiral in the navy, and died 11 September 1863. His daughter married John Borthwick of Crookston FRSE (1787–1845).

== Notes ==
Parliament of Great Britain
Preceded by Henry Dundas	Member of Parliament for Midlothian; 1790–1801	Succeeded by Parliament of the United Kingdom
Parliament of the United Kingdom
Preceded by Parliament of Great Britain	Member of Parliament for Midlothian; 1801	Succeeded by Robert Dundas
Legal offices
Preceded by Alexander Wight	Solicitor General for Scotland; 1784–1789	Succeeded by Robert Blair
Preceded by Ilay Campbell	Lord Advocate; 1789–1801	Succeeded by Charles Hope
Preceded by Sir James Montgomery	Chief Baron of the Exchequer; 1801–1819	Succeeded by Sir Samuel Shepherd
Academic offices
Preceded by Lord Craig	Rector of the University of Glasgow; 1803–1805	Succeeded by Henry Glassford of Dugalston
