= David Rae, Lord Eskgrove =

Scottish judge

Lord Eskgrove
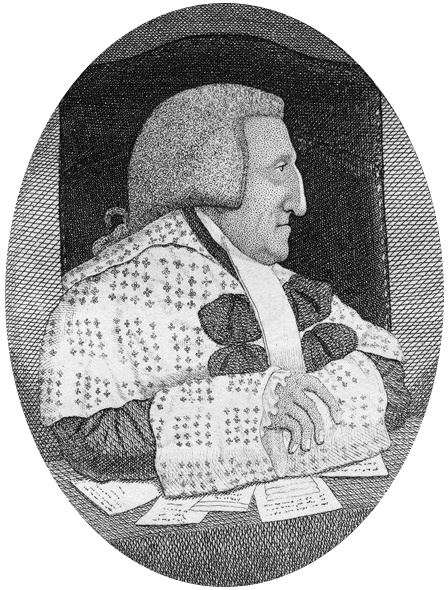
- Lord Eskgrove
- Born: 1724
- Died: 1804 (aged 79–80)
- Education: University of Edinburgh
- Occupation: Judge

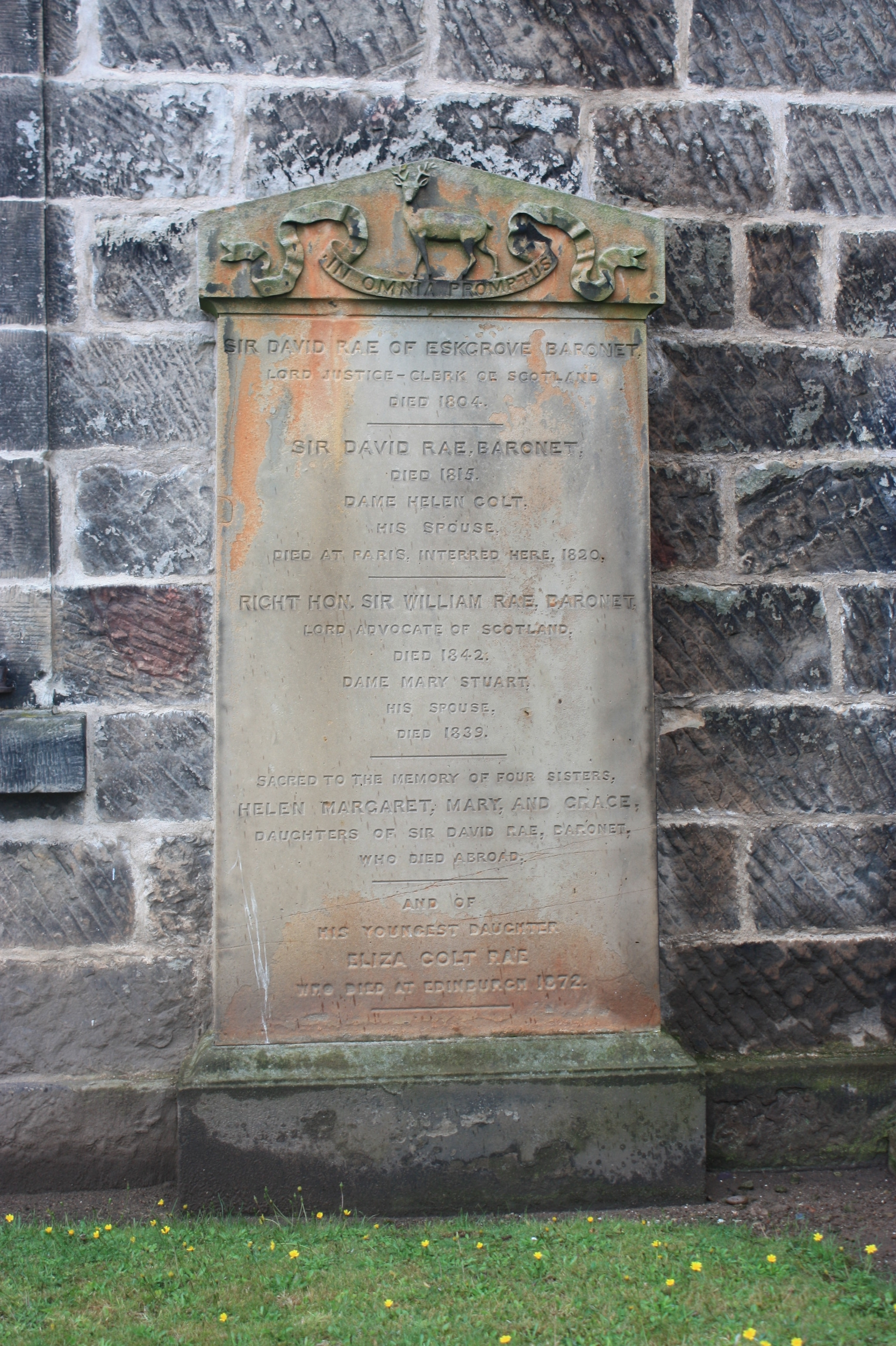
Sir David Rae's grave, Inveresk

Sir David Rae, Lord Eskgrove, 1st Baronet FRSE FSA (1724–1804) was a Scottish advocate and judge.

== Life ==
He was the son of Agnes, daughter of Sir David Forbes of Newhall and Rev David Rae of St Andrews, an episcopalian minister. Some sources give his mother as Margaret Stewart of Blairhall, daughter of Dugald Stewart, Lord Blairhall.

He was educated at the grammar school in Haddington, and then studied law at the University of Edinburgh, where he attended the law lectures of John Erskine of Carnock.

He was admitted a member of the Faculty of Advocates on 11 December 1751, and quickly acquired a practice. In 1753 he was retained in an appeal to the House of Lords, which brought him to London, where he became acquainted with Lord Hardwicke and his son Charles Yorke. He was appointed one of the commissioners for collecting evidence in the Douglas case, and in that capacity accompanied James Burnett to France in September 1764. He was the leading advocate in the Scottish court of exchequer for many years.

In 1773 he was living at Old Assembly Close on the Royal Mile in Edinburgh. In 1783 he was a joint founder of the Royal Society of Edinburgh.

He became a Lord of Session on 14 November 1782, succeeding Alexander Boswell, Lord Auchinleck, and a Lord of Justiciary on 20 April 1785, taking the judicial title Lord Eskgrove (from a small estate which he possessed near Inveresk), in place of Robert Bruce, Lord Kennet. Rae was one of the judges who tried William Brodie (died 1788) for robbing the General Excise Office in August 1788, the Rev. Thomas Fyshe Palmer for seditious practices in September 1793, William Skirving and Maurice Margarot for sedition in January 1794, Joseph Gerrald for sedition in March 1794, and Robert Watt and David Downie for high treason in September 1794.

In January 1798 he oversaw the trial of George Mealmaker and other radicals.

He was appointed Lord Justice Clerk on 1 June 1799, in place of Robert Macqueen, Lord Braxfield, holding office until his death. At this time he was living at 10 St John Street off the Canongate in Edinburgh.

He was created a baronet on 27 June 1804. He died at his country residence, Eskgrove in Inveresk on 23 October the same year, and was interred in Inveresk Kirkyard. He has a modest stone on the south side of the church itself (St. Michael's) just to the left hand side of the south door. His wife and children are buried with him. This includes his son, Sir William Rae, 3rd Baronet, Lord Advocate of Scotland, here reduced to a simple name within a list on the stone.

== Reputation ==
Rae is remembered by Lord Henry Cockburn in his book Memorials of His Time (published posthumously in 1856), as a "considerable lawyer" who became a deplorable judge, and Cockburn concludes "a more ludicrous personage could not exist".

:To be able to give an anecdote of Eskgrove, with a proper imitation of his voice and manner, was a sort of fortune in society. [...] Yet never once did he do or say anything which had the slightest claim to be remembered for any intrinsic merit. The value of all his words and actions consisted in their absurdity. [...] The voice was low and mumbling, and on the bench was generally inaudible for some time after the movement of the lips showed that he had begun speaking; after which the first word that was let fairly out was generally the loudest of the whole discourse.

== Works ==
With John Campbell and others, Rae collected the Decisions of the Court of Session from the end of the year 1756 to the end of the year 1760, Edinburgh, 1765.

== Family ==
On 14 October 1761 he married Margaret Stewart (died 1770), youngest daughter of John Stewart of Blairhall, Perthshire, by whom he had two sons and one daughter:

- David, who succeeded as the second baronet, but died without male issue on 22 May 1815. David married Helen Colt and had five daughters: Helen, Margaret, Mary and Grace and Eliza Colt Rae his youngest daughter who died at Edinburgh in 1872 (reference from the memorial stone)
- William (1769–1842) called to the bar in 1791, Office of Lord Advocate of Scotland from 1827 to 1830 (presiding judge at the trial of Burke & Hare on 24 December 1828 in Edinburgh); then MP for Anstruther burghs between 1819 and 1826, then as MP for Buteshire in 1830. Between 1831 and 1832 he was M.P for Portarlington, then returned to Buteshire as MP between 1833 and 1842. He died at St Catherine's House (Liberton, Edinburgh) in 1842. and
- Margaret, who married, on 3 January 1804, Captain Thomas Phipps Howard of the 23rd Light Dragoons.

Legal offices
Preceded by Robert Macqueen	Lord Justice Clerk; 1799–1804	Succeeded by Charles Hope
Baronetage of the United Kingdom
New creation	Baronet (of Esk Grove); 1804	Succeeded by David Rae
