= Ilay Campbell, Lord Succoth =

Scottish judge and politician (1734–1823)

The Much Honoured Lord Succoth FRSE
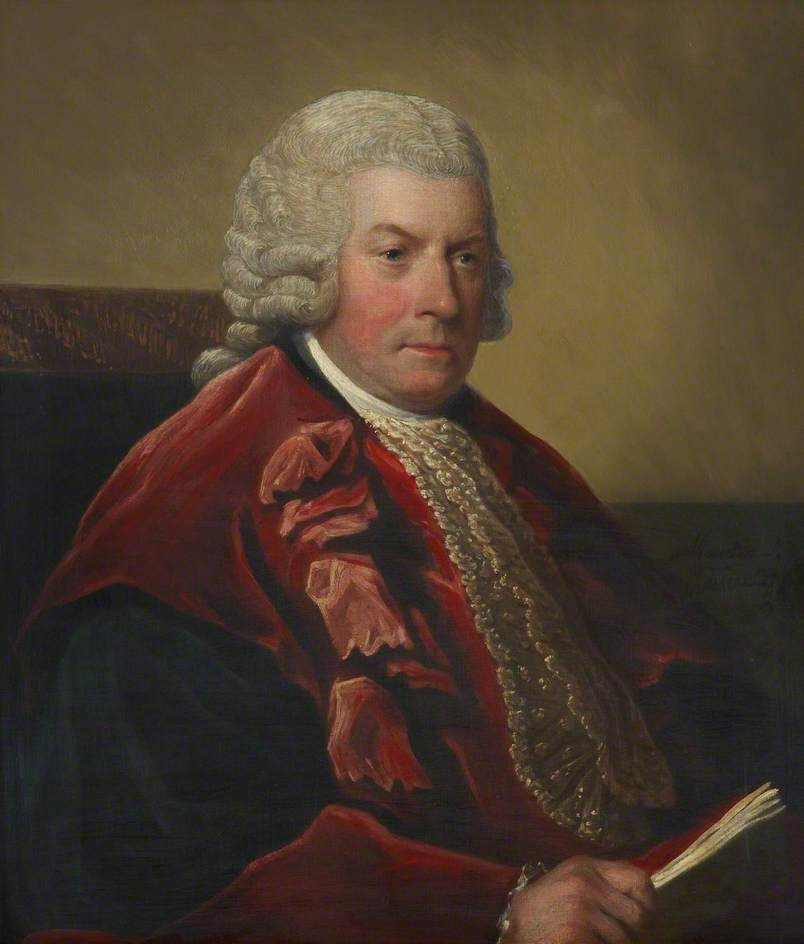
- Portrait by David Martin

Lord President of the Court of Session
- In office 26 October 1789 – 31 August 1808
- Appointed by: George III
- Preceded by: Lord Glenlee
- Succeeded by: Robert Blair

Member of Parliament for Glasgow Burghs
- In office 1784–1790
- Preceded by: John Craufurd
- Succeeded by: John Craufurd

Lord Advocate
- In office 1784–1790
- Preceded by: The Hon Henry Erskine
- Succeeded by: Robert Dundas

Solicitor General for Scotland
- In office 1783–1784
- Preceded by: Alexander Murray
- Succeeded by: Robert Blair

Personal details
- Born: 23 August 1734 Edinburgh, Scotland
- Died: 28 March 1823 (aged 88)
- Party: Pittite
- Spouse: Susan Mary Murray (m. 1766; died 1815)
- Relations: Archibald Campbell Tait (grandson)
- Parent(s): Helen Wallace; Archibald Campbell
- Education: University of Glasgow
- Profession: Advocate, Judge, Politician

Sir Ilay Campbell, 1st Baronet, Lord Succoth, FRSE (23 August 1734 – 28 March 1823) was a Scottish advocate, judge and politician. He rose to be Lord President of the Court of Session.

== Early life ==
Campbell's birthplace is given as either Argyll or Edinburgh. His mother was Helen Wallace, and his father, Archibald Campbell of Succoth, Principal Clerk of Session to the Scottish Courts.

He attended Mundell's School in Edinburgh and then the University of Glasgow to study law, graduating in 1751.

== Career ==
An advocate from 1757, he was engaged in the Douglas peerage case from 1764 to 1769. in September 1759 Campbell was admitted as an elder of Old Kilpatrick parish. On 26 January 1777 his home on the second floor of a tenement in Old Bank Close, Edinburgh, was damaged in a fire.

Campbell was appointed Solicitor General for Scotland in 1783 and Lord Advocate in 1784. He became Member of Parliament for Glasgow Burghs in the same year. He was Lord President of the Court of Session and Lord Justice General from 1789 to 1808, where he sat as Lord Succoth.

On his resignation in 1808, he was created a baronet, and resided at Garscube House, about four miles from Glasgow on the banks of the river Kelvin. There he engaged in the management of his estate, and the performance of his duties as a country gentleman. Lord Cockburn says of him that "he lived like a patriarch in a house overflowing with company, beloved by troops of relations, and courted for his character and hospitality by many friends."

Campbell was awarded an honorary doctorate (LLD) from the University of Glasgow in 1784, and elected Lord Rector of the university in 1799. He died at Garscube in 1823 aged 89.

Campbell was succeeded by his son Archibald, also a Senator of the College of Justice under the same title of Lord Succoth.

It is worth observing that the title "Lord Succoth" derived from the 1st and 2nd baronets' status as lords of session rather than as Lords of Parliament. As such, the title "Lord Succoth" was not hereditable. The honorific "The Much Honoured" references a feudal barony ("of Succoth"). Sir Ilay's descendants remained baronets until the extinction of the baronetcy in 2017.

== Personal life ==
In 1766, Campbell married Susan Mary Murray of Murrayfield, sister of Alexander Murray, Lord Henderland. Before her death in 1815, they were the parents of:

- Margaret Campbell, who married Sir John Connell, Judge of the Admiralty Court.
- Jean Campbell (b. 1767), who married John MacNeil of Gigha in 1797.
- Sir Archibald Campbell, 2nd Baronet (1769–1846), who married Elizabeth Balfour, daughter of John Balfour, 5th of Balbirnie, in 1794.
- Alexander Campbell (1771–1799), WS; he died unmarried.
- Anne Campbell (b. 1773), who married Francis Sitwell, MP for Berwick-upon-Tweed, son of Francis (né Hurt) Sitwell and Mary Warneford, in 1795.
- Susan Campbell (1775–1814), who married Crauford Tait, WS of Harviestoun, in 1795.
- Mary Campbell (1777–1820), who married General Sir Charles Shalders.
- Elizabeth Glen Campbell (1778–1853), who married William Dalzeil Colquhoun of Garscadden in 1801.

Lord Succoth died on 28 March 1823 and was succeeded in the baronetcy by his eldest son, Archibald.

=== Descendants ===
Through his daughter Margaret, he was a grandfather of Arthur Connell FRSE, a chemist who discovered connellite.

Through his daughter Susan, he was a grandfather of Archibald Campbell Tait, the Archbishop of Canterbury.

== Positions of note ==
- Founder member of the Royal Society of Edinburgh (1783)
- Director of the Highland Society (1784)
- Trustee for the University of Edinburgh and South Bridge

Parliament of Great Britain
Preceded by John Craufurd	Member of Parliament for Glasgow Burghs; 1784–1790	Succeeded by John Craufurd
Legal offices
Preceded by Alexander Murray	Solicitor General for Scotland; 1783–1784	Succeeded by Robert Blair
Preceded by The Hon Henry Erskine	Lord Advocate; 1784–1789	Succeeded by Robert Dundas
Preceded by Lord Glenlee	Lord Justice General; 1789–1808	Succeeded by Robert Blair
Academic offices
Preceded by George Oswald of Auchencruive	Rector of the University of Glasgow; 1779–1801	Succeeded by Lord Craig
Baronetage of the United Kingdom
New creation	Baronet (of Succoth); 1808–1823	Succeeded by Archibald Campbell
