= Robert Blair, Lord Avontoun =

Scottish advocate and judge (1741–1811)

Robert Blair, Lord Avontoun FRSE
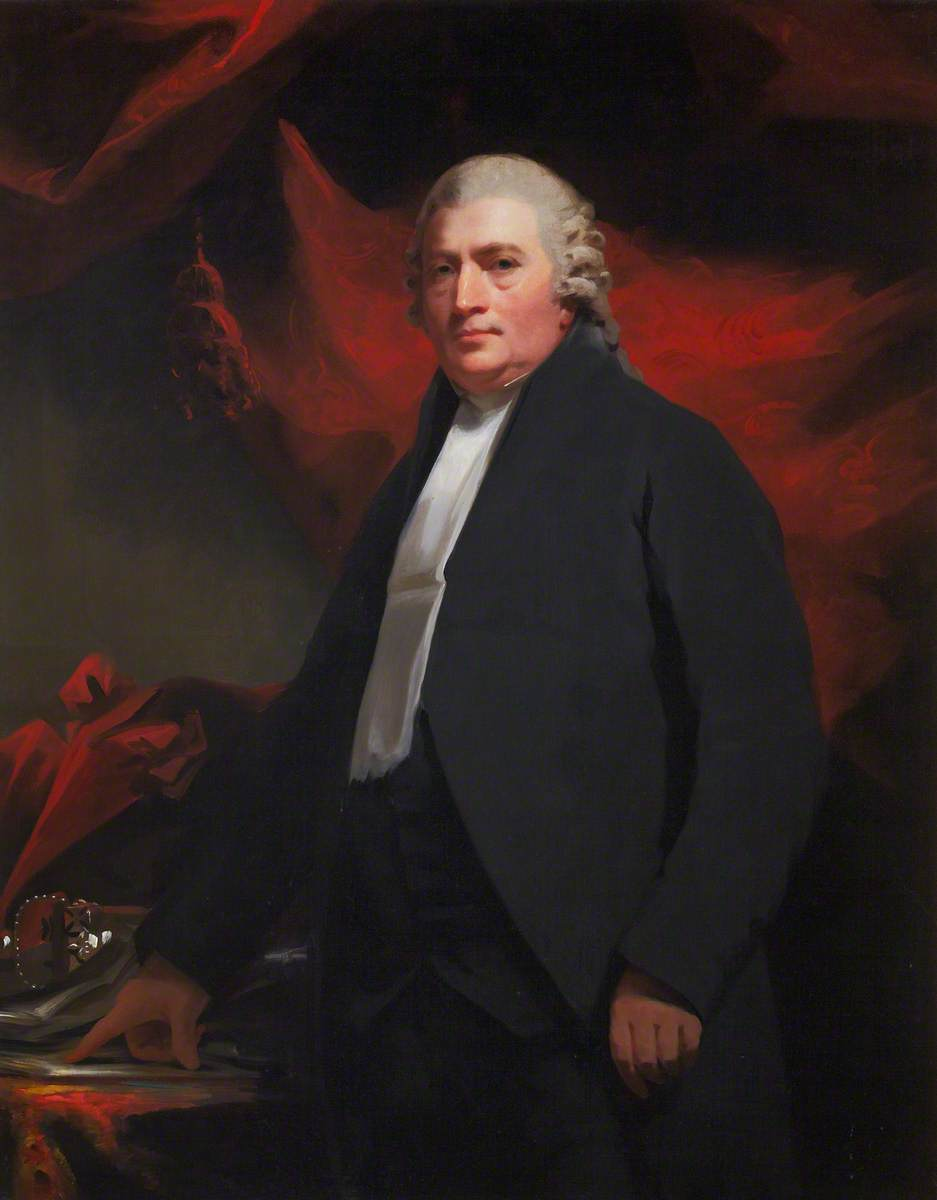
- painting by Henry Raeburn

Lord President of the Court of Session
- In office 31 August 1808 – 20 May 1811
- Preceded by: Ilay Campbell
- Succeeded by: Charles Hope

Solicitor General for Scotland
- In office 1789–1806
- Preceded by: Robert Dundas
- Succeeded by: John Clerk

Personal details
- Born: Robert Blair; 1741 Athelstaneford, Scotland
- Died: 20 May 1811 (aged 69–70) Edinburgh, Scotland
- Resting place: Greyfriars Kirkyard
- Spouse: Isabella Cornelia Halkett (m. 1786)
- Children: 4
- Parent: Robert Blair
- Education: University of Edinburgh

Robert Blair of Avontoun FRSE (1741 – 20 May 1811) was a Scottish advocate and judge who served as Solicitor General for Scotland from 1789 to 1806, Dean of the Faculty of Advocates from 1801 to 1808, and Lord President of the Court of Session from 1808 to his death.

== Early life ==
He was born in 1741 at the manse in Athelstaneford, where his father was the minister. He was the third son of Rev Robert Blair, the poet and Isabella Law, his wife, the daughter of Mr. William Law of Elvingston, East Lothian.

Young Blair commenced his education at the grammar school at Haddington, where he formed a friendship with Henry Dundas, 1st Viscount Melville, which only ended with their lives. From Haddington he was removed to the high school at Edinburgh, and thence was transferred to the University of Edinburgh.

== Career ==
In 1764, he was admitted a member of the Faculty of Advocates, and soon obtained a considerable practice at the bar, where he and Henry Erskine were often pitted against each other. In 1789, Blair was appointed by his friend Dundas one of the depute advocates, which office he continued to hold until 1806. For some years also he was one of the assessors of the city of Edinburgh.

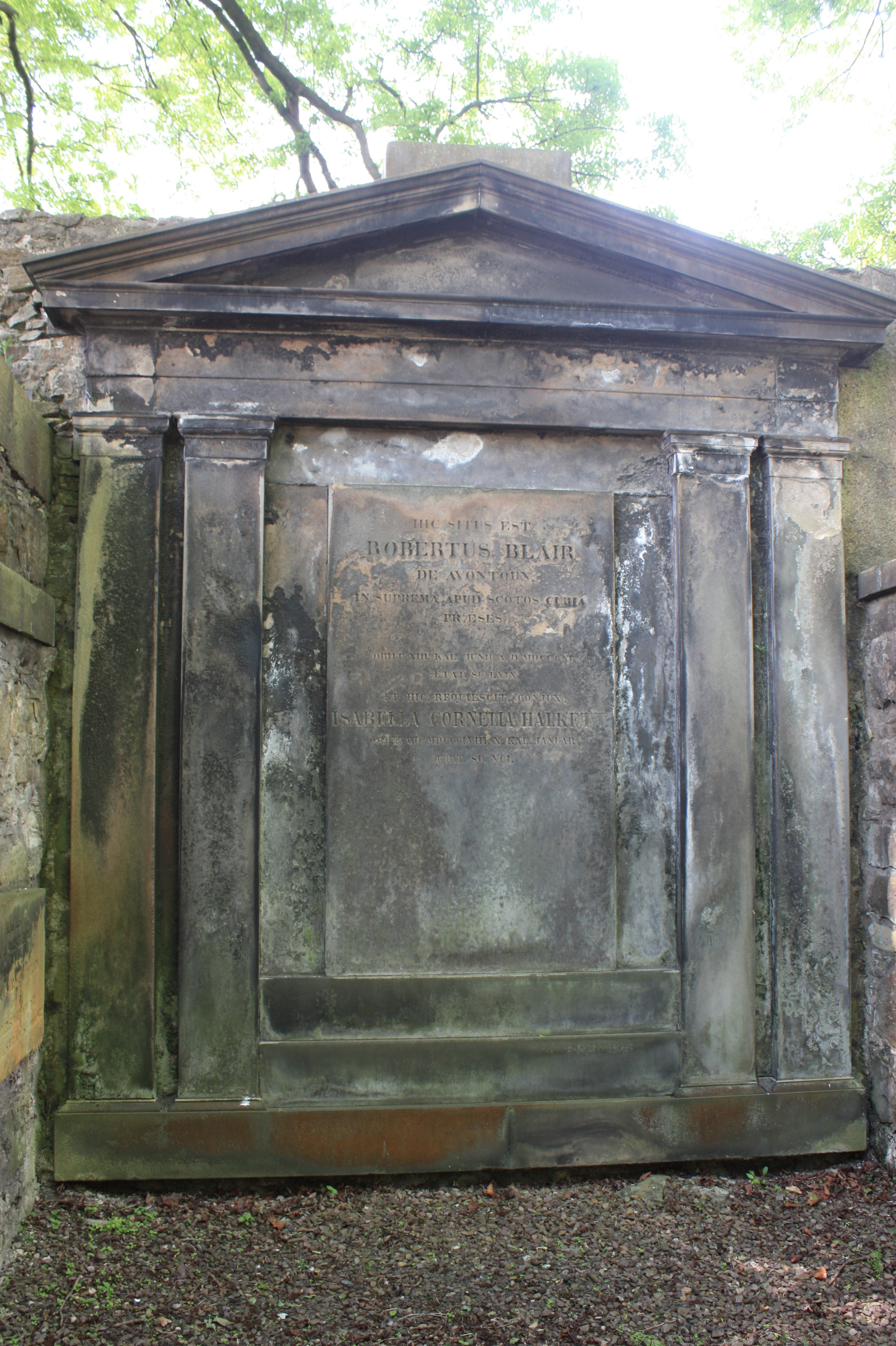
The grave of Robert Blair, Greyfriars Kirkyard

In November 1783 he was one of the founding members of the Royal Society of Edinburgh.

In 1789, at the age of forty-seven, Blair became Solicitor General for Scotland. This post he continued to occupy until the change of ministry which was occasioned by Pitt's death in 1806. During tRhis period he twice refused the offer of a seat on the judicial bench, and both in 1802 and 1805 declined to accept the office of lord advocate. In 1801, he was elected dean of the faculty of advocates. Upon the return of his friends to power in 1807, he refused the offices of solicitor-general and lord advocate, but in the next year, upon the resignation of Sir Ilay Campbell, he accepted the presidency of the college of justice, thereafter being known as Lord President Blair..

== Personal life ==
Blair married Isabella Cornelia Halkett on 19 May 1786 in Edinburgh, the youngest daughter of Colonel Charles Craigie Halkett of Lawhill, Fife.

His daughter married Alexander Maconochie, Lord Meadowbank and was mother to Professor Allan Alexander Maconochie FRSE.

== Death and legacy ==
He died suddenly on 20 May 1811, at home at 56 George Square in Edinburgh. He is buried nearby in Greyfriars Kirkyard. The grave lies in the sealed south-west section of the graveyard known as the Covenanter's Prison.

His old friend, Henry Dundas, 1st Viscount Melville, who came to Edinburgh specifically to attend Blair's funeral, was taken ill, and died on the very day Blair was buried. This unusual coincidence gave rise a circulated publication, 'Monody on the Death of the Right Hon. Henry Lord Viscount Melville, and Right Hon. Robert Blair of Avontown, Lord President of the College of Justice' (Edinburgh, 1811), written by an anonymous author. Presuming this to be a correct story this would place the funeral on 28 May 1811.

His widow, one son, and three daughters, survived him; but he left them so badly off that a pension was granted by the crown to his widow and daughters through the instrumentality of Mr. Perceval.

He was a man of a very powerful understanding, with a thoroughly logical mind and a firm grasp of legal principles, but without any gift of eloquence or even of fluency of speech. He had such 'an innate love of justice and abhorrence of iniquity,’ and took so liberal and enlarged a view of law, that he was eminently qualified to fill the post which he held for so short a time. It is somewhat remarkable that Blair never sat in parliament. As a recreation he took much pleasure in agricultural pursuits, and he brought his small estate at Avontoun, near Linlithgow, to the highest state of cultivation. His statue by Chantrey stands in the first division of the inner house of the Court of Session. Two portraits of him were taken by Kay of Edinburgh, one in 1793, and the other in 1799.

Legal offices
Preceded by Alexander Wight	Solicitor General for Scotland; 1789–1806	Succeeded by John Clerk
Preceded by Ilay Campbell	Lord President of the Court of Session; 1808–1811	Succeeded by Lord Granton
