= 1815 in Scotland =

- Centuries: 17th; 18th; 19th; 20th; 21st
- Decades: 1790s; 1800s; 1810s; 1820s; 1830s
- See also: List of years in Scotland; Timeline of Scottish history 1815 in: The UK • Wales • Elsewhere

Events from the year 1815 in Scotland.

== Incumbents ==
=== Law officers ===
- Lord Advocate – Archibald Colquhoun
- Solicitor General for Scotland – Alexander Maconochie

=== Judiciary ===
- Lord President of the Court of Session – Lord Granton
- Lord Justice General – The Duke of Montrose
- Lord Justice Clerk – Lord Boyle

== Events ==
- February/March – foundation stone of Montrose Academy laid.
- 18 June – Battle of Waterloo: Ensign Charles Ewart of the Royal Scots Greys captures the French Imperial Eagle standard.
- 1 July – Union Bank of Scotland opens.
- 19 September – foundation stones for Regent Bridge and Calton Jail in Edinburgh laid.
- The Nelson Monument, Edinburgh, on Calton Hill, is dedicated.
- Hackness Martello Tower and Battery and Crockness Martello tower in Orkney are completed.
- Dunans and Ferness Bridges and Avoch harbour are completed to the designs of Thomas Telford.
- Glenfinnan Monument erected to mark the landing of "Bonnie Prince Charlie" at the start of the Jacobite rising of 1745 to the design of James Gillespie Graham.
- Armadale Castle on Skye is built in the style of Scottish Baronial architecture to the design of James Gillespie Graham.
- A Jury Court as a division of the Court of Session is introduced.
- Regius Professorships at the University of Glasgow in Midwifery and Surgery are established by King George III.
- The Scottish Widows Fund and Life Assurance Society opens to business as Scotland's first mutual life insurance office.
- On Islay, Ardbeg distillery begins commercial production and Laphroaig distillery is established by Donald and Alexander Johnston.
- The Clyde Shipping Company is set up by John Henderson, William Croil, Donald McPhee and George Jardine Kidston to provide services by paddle steamer.
- Pringle of Scotland, knitwear manufacturer, is established by Robert Pringle in the Borders.
- John Fletcher Macfarlan takes over the family apothecary business in Edinburgh, the predecessor of MacFarlan Smith, and begins to manufacture laudanum.
- Aberdeen Savings Bank is formed.

== Births ==
- 11 January
  - John A. Macdonald, first Prime Minister of Canada (died 1891 in Ottawa)
  - David Stevenson, lighthouse engineer (died 1886)
- 22 January – William Brodie, sculptor (died 1881)
- 25 March – George Thomson, shipbuilder (died 1866)
- 1 April – William Chalmers Burns, evangelical missionary to China (died 1868)
- 19 May
  - Kate Dickens, née Catherine Hogarth, wife of Charles Dickens (died 1879 in London)
  - Hugh Fraser, retailer (died 1873)
- 11 June – W McEwan, cricketer (died 1862 in Australia)
- 12 June – James Valentine, photographer (died 1879)
- 29 August – James Fenton, railway engineer (died 1863)
- 20 December – James Legge, Congregationalist missionary to China (died 1897 in Oxford)
- Thomas Stuart Smith, painter and benefactor (died 1869 in Avignon)

== Deaths ==
- 14 January – William Creech, publisher and Lord Provost of Edinburgh (born 1745)
- 4 February – John Ferriar, physician and writer (born 1761)
- 9 February – Claudius Buchanan, theologian, Church of England missionary to India (born 1766)
- 23 February – William Duff, Presbyterian minister and writer on psychology (born 1732)
- 10 April – William Roxburgh, Scottish surgeon and botanist (born 1751)
- 26 August – John Spalding, politician (born 1763)
- 8 September – Andrew Graham, naturalist
- 28 September – Gilbert Gerard, theological writer (born 1760)
- 9 December – Patrick Miller of Dalswinton, banker and steamboat promoter (born 1730)
- Thomas Keith, soldier (born c.1793)

== The arts ==
- Christian Isobel Johnstone's novel Clan-Albin: A National Tale is published.
- Robert Kirk's The Secret Commonwealth, Gaelic folklore collected in 1691/92, is first published.
- Walter Scott's narrative poem The Lord of the Isles and anonymous novel Guy Mannering are published.
- 6-year-old Edgar Allan Poe attends school in Irvine, North Ayrshire.

== See also ==
- Timeline of Scottish history
- 1815 in Ireland
