= 1813 in Scotland =

- Centuries: 17th; 18th; 19th; 20th; 21st
- Decades: 1790s; 1800s; 1810s; 1820s; 1830s
- See also: List of years in Scotland; Timeline of Scottish history 1813 in: The UK • Wales • Elsewhere

Events from the year 1813 in Scotland.

== Incumbents ==
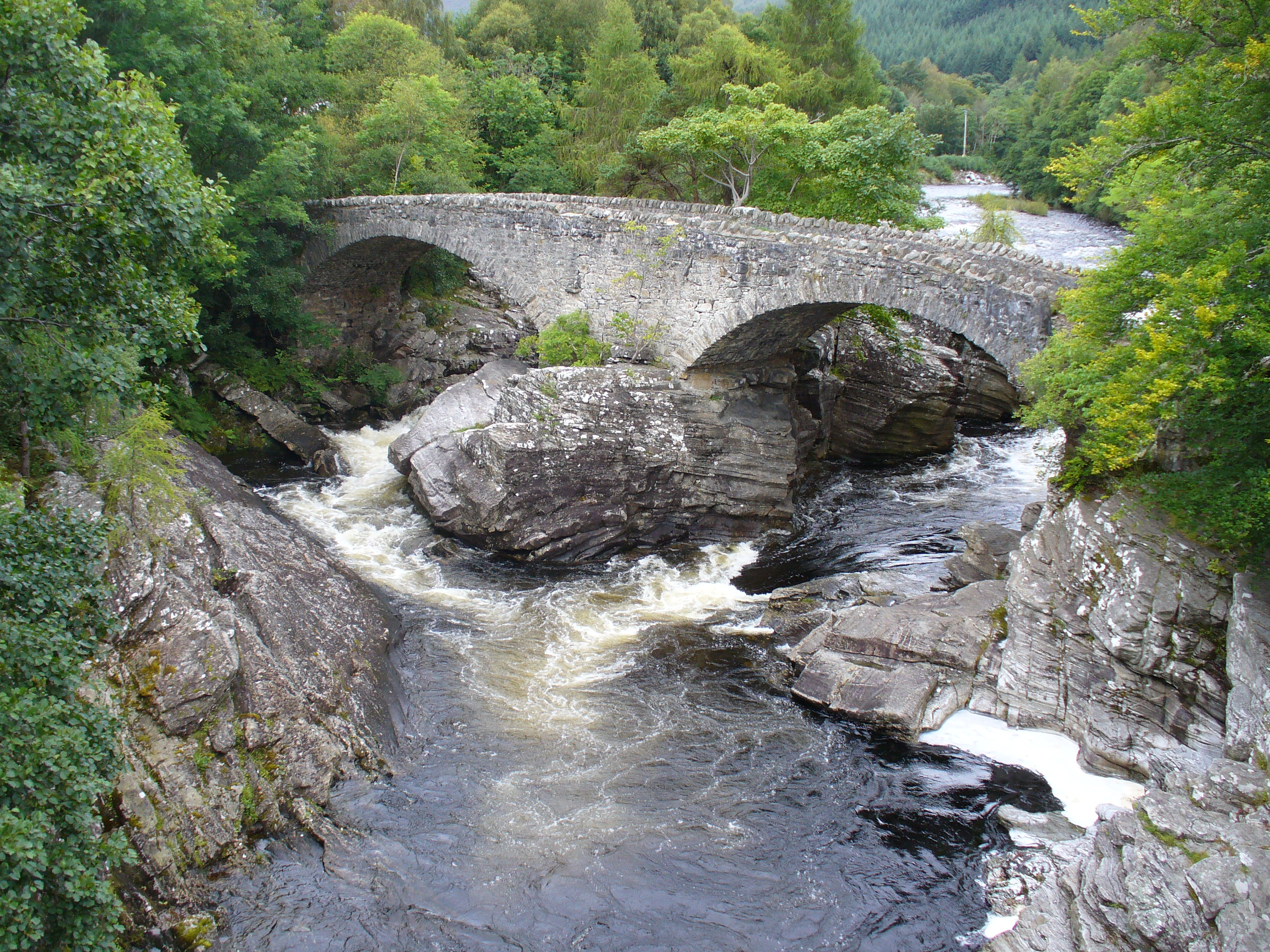
The Telford bridge at Invermoriston

=== Law officers ===
- Lord Advocate – Archibald Colquhoun
- Solicitor General for Scotland – David Monypenny; then Alexander Maconochie

=== Judiciary ===
- Lord President of the Court of Session – Lord Granton
- Lord Justice General – The Duke of Montrose
- Lord Justice Clerk – Lord Boyle

== Events ==
- 1 April – whaler Oscar wrecked off Aberdeen with the loss of 44 lives.
- 15 April – foundation stone of new harbour at Newhaven, Edinburgh, laid.
- October
  - Completion of road bridge at Potarch by Thomas Telford; his bridge at Invermoriston is also completed this year.
  - Probable completion of cast-iron footbridge over Esk on Buccleuch estate near Langholm.
- The first Kirkcaldy whaler, The Earl Percy, sails north to the Davis Strait.
- Glasgow weavers fail in an attempt to secure higher wages.
- Robert Owen obtains control of the cotton spinning mills at New Lanark and publishes A New View of Society, or Essays on the Principle of the Formation of the Human Character.

== Births ==
- 30 January – George Gilfillan, writer and poet (died 1878)
- 18 March –
  - Thomas Graham Balfour, physician (died 1891 in London)
  - William Calder Marshall, sculptor (died 1894 in London)
- 19 March – David Livingstone, missionary and explorer (died 1873 in Africa)
- 13 April – Duncan Farquharson Gregory, mathematician (died 1844)
- 14 May (bapt.) – John Hosack, lawyer and historian (died 1887 in London)
- 17 May? – Eliza Rennie, author
- 18 May – Colin Blackburn, Baron Blackburn, judge (died 1896)
- 21 May – Robert Murray M'Cheyne, clergyman (died 1843)
- 27 May – William McNaught, steam engineer (died 1881 in Manchester)
- 21 June – William Edmondstoune Aytoun, lawyer and poet (died 1865)
- 28 July – James Newlands, municipal engineer (died 1871 in Liverpool)
- 10 August – Archibald Smith, mathematician and lawyer (died 1872 in London)
- 6 September – Edward Balfour, surgeon and orientalist (died 1889 in London)
- 10 September – Angus MacKay, piper (died 1859)
- 13 September – Daniel MacMillan, publisher (died 1857)
- 30 September – John Rae, Arctic explorer and physician (died 1893 in London)
- November – John Stuart, antiquarian (died 1877)
- 13 December –
  - James R. Ballantyne, orientalist (died 1864)
  - David Brandon, architect (died 1897)
  - George Bryson Sr., businessman and politician in Quebec (died 1900 in Canada)
- 18 December – John Edgar Gregan, architect (died 1855 in Manchester)
- John Bell-Irving, businessman in Hong Kong (died 1907)
- James Colquhoun Campbell, Bishop of Bangor (died 1895 in Hastings)
- Benjamin Connor, steam locomotive designer (died 1876)
- Anthony Inglis, shipbuilder (died 1884)
- John Kennedy, Congregational minister and theologian (died 1900)
- William Logan, temperance campaigner (died 1879)
- Letitia MacTavish Hargrave, born Letitia MacTavish, pioneer in Canada (died 1854)
- Daniel M'Naghten, assassin (died 1865 in Broadmoor Criminal Lunatic Asylum)
- George Tosh, metallurgist (died 1900 in Scunthorpe)

== Deaths ==
- 5 January – Alexander Fraser Tytler, judge and historian (born 1747)
- 15 February – Francis Home, physician (born 1719)
- 15 March – Janet Richmond, born Janet Little, "The Scots Milkmaid", Scots language poet (born 1759)
- 15 April – Alexander Murray, linguist (born 1775)
- 22 June – Allan Burns, surgeon (born 1781)
- 8 July – William Craig, Lord Craig, judge (born 1745)
- 23 August – Alexander Wilson, ornithologist in America (born 1766)
- 11 October – Robert Kerr, scientific writer and translator (born 1755)
- 28 October – William Dudgeon, farmer and songwriter (born 1753?)

== The arts ==
- James Hogg's poem The Queen's Wake is published.

== See also ==
- Timeline of Scottish history
- 1813 in Ireland
