= 1814 in Scotland =

- Centuries: 17th; 18th; 19th; 20th; 21st
- Decades: 1790s; 1800s; 1810s; 1820s; 1830s
- See also: List of years in Scotland; Timeline of Scottish history 1814 in: The UK • Wales • Elsewhere

Events from the year 1814 in Scotland.

== Incumbents ==
=== Law officers ===
- Lord Advocate – Archibald Colquhoun
- Solicitor General for Scotland – Alexander Maconochie

=== Judiciary ===
- Lord President of the Court of Session – Lord Granton
- Lord Justice General – The Duke of Montrose
- Lord Justice Clerk – Lord Boyle

== Events ==
- From midyear – Highland Clearances: Patrick Sellar begins mass expulsion of crofting tenants from Strathnaver at Grummore to make way for sheep farming as factor for the Marquess and Marchioness of Stafford.
- 7 July – Walter Scott's Waverley, his first prose fiction and one of the first significant historical novels in English, set during the Jacobite rising of 1745, is published anonymously by Archibald Constable in Edinburgh, selling out in two days.
- October – Thomas Telford's Lovat Bridge, the first over the River Beauly, is opened.
- November – Thomas Telford's cast iron Craigellachie Bridge over the River Spey is opened.
- Thomas Telford's Craighouse pier on Jura is constructed.
- Building of the industrial village of Friockheim in Angus is begun.
- Gartnavel Royal Hospital is established as the Glasgow Lunatic Asylum.
- Glasgow Medical Society is established.
- Chapel of St Mary's, designed by James Gillespie Graham, opened in Edinburgh, the origin of St Mary's Cathedral, Edinburgh (Roman Catholic).
- St George's Church, Charlotte Square, New Town, Edinburgh, designed by Robert Reid after Robert Adam, is completed.
- William Wallace Statue, Bemersyde, erected.
- Mary Brunton's novel Discipline, set in the Highlands, is published.
- Ayrshire cattle recognised as a distinct breed by the Highland and Agricultural Society.

== Births ==
- 7 January – Robert Nicoll, radical journalist and poet (died 1837)
- 31 January – Andrew Ramsay, geologist (died 1891)
- 27 February – Robert Turnbull Macpherson, artist and photographer working in Rome (died 1872)
- 20 March – John Goodsir, pathologist (died 1867)
- 28 March – John Thomas Rochead, architect (died 1878)
- 10 April – Edward Gordon, Baron Gordon of Drumearn, judge and politician (died 1879)
- 7 May – George Heriot Swanston, map engraver
- 21 June – Samuel Halkett, librarian (died 1871)
- 8 July – Arthur Kinnaird, 10th Lord Kinnaird, banker, Liberal politician and evangelical clergyman (died 1887)
- 26 July – John Arnott, entrepreneur in Ireland (died 1898 in Ireland)
- 27 September – John Burnet, architect (died 1901)
- 20 December – William McGill, physician and Member of Provincial Parliament (Ontario) (died 1883 in Canada)

== Deaths ==
- 3 January – James Townsend Oswald, Member of Parliament (born 1748)
- 28 January – William Dalrymple, moderator of the Church of Scotland (born 1723)
- 15 June – Robert Findlay, minister (born 1721)
- 8 July – John Chisholm, bishop of the Roman Catholic church (born 1752)
- 3 November – William Richardson, classicist and literary scholar (born 1743)
- John Adams, educational writer born 1750?)
- Alexander Cummings, inventor (born 1733)
- William Kerr, gardener and botanist (died in Ceylon)
- Thomas Smith, lighting engineer (born 1752)

== See also ==
- 1814 in Ireland
