= 1812 in Scotland =

- Centuries: 17th; 18th; 19th; 20th; 21st
- Decades: 1790s; 1800s; 1810s; 1820s; 1830s
- See also: List of years in Scotland; Timeline of Scottish history 1812 in: The UK • Wales • Elsewhere

Events from the year 1812 in Scotland.

== Incumbents ==
=== Law officers ===
- Lord Advocate – Archibald Colquhoun
- Solicitor General for Scotland – David Monypenny

=== Judiciary ===
- Lord President of the Court of Session – Lord Granton
- Lord Justice General – The Duke of Montrose
- Lord Justice Clerk – Lord Boyle

== Events ==
- 1 January – Tron riot in Edinburgh concludes.
- March – meeting in Edinburgh to discuss formation of the Scottish Widows Fund and Life Assurance Society.
- 6 July – the Kilmarnock and Troon Railway becomes the first public railway line to open in Scotland. It begins life as a 9.5-mile (16-kilometre), horse-drawn waggonway to carry coal from Kilmarnock to Troon harbour. On 27 June the horse-drawn passenger coach Caledonia began running over the line between Troon and Gargieston, near Kilmarnock.
- 12 July (The Twelfth) – first Protestant Orange march in Scotland held in Glasgow, attracting hostile Catholic crowds.
- August – Henry Bell's PS Comet begins a passenger service on the River Clyde between Glasgow and Greenock, the first commercially successful steamboat service in Europe.
- November – first bridge at Bonar Bridge completed in cast iron to the design of Thomas Telford.
- Ongoing – Highland Clearances.
- Nelson's Tower completed in Forres as a monument to Lord Nelson.
- Brackla distillery built by Captain William Fraser of Brackla House on the estate of Cawdor Castle.
- Glasgow Bible Society established.
- Gaelic chapel opens in London.

== Births ==
- 3 February – William Fraser Tolmie, scientist and politician in Canada (died 1886 in Canada)
- 29 February – James Milne Wilson, Premier of Tasmania (died 29 February 1880 in Tasmania)
- 26 March (probable date) – Charles Mackay, writer (died 1889)
- 4 April – George Grub, church historian (died 1892)
- 27 May – Robert Stirling Newall, engineer and astronomer (died 1889)
- 3 June – Norman Macleod, Church of Scotland minister (died 1872)
- 2 September – Kirkpatrick Macmillan, inventor of the bicycle (died 1878)
- 16 September – Robert Fortune, botanist, pioneer of the Indian tea industry (died 1880)
- 23 December – Samuel Smiles, author and reformer (died 1904)

== Deaths ==
- 23 January – Robert Craufurd, general (mortally wounded during Peninsular War) (born 1764)
- 14 May – Duncan Ban MacIntyre, Gaelic poet (born 1724)

== The arts ==
- William Tennant's ottava rima mock-heroic poem Anster Fair is published, the first use of this Italian style in Britain.

== See also ==
- Timeline of Scottish history
- 1812 in Ireland
