= 1886 in Scotland =

- Centuries: 17th; 18th; 19th; 20th; 21st
- Decades: 1860s; 1870s; 1880s; 1890s; 1900s
- See also: List of years in Scotland; Timeline of Scottish history 1886 in: The UK • Wales • Elsewhere; Scottish football: 1885–86 • 1886–87

Events from the year 1886 in Scotland.

== Incumbents ==
- Secretary for Scotland and Keeper of the Great Seal – The Duke of Richmond to 28 January; then George Trevelyan to March; then The Earl of Dalhousie 5 April – 20 July; then Arthur Balfour from 5 August

=== Law officers ===
- Lord Advocate – John Macdonald until February; then John Blair Balfour until August; then John Macdonald
- Solicitor General for Scotland – James Robertson

=== Judiciary ===
- Lord President of the Court of Session and Lord Justice General – Lord Glencorse
- Lord Justice Clerk – Lord Moncreiff

== Events ==
- 8 March – The Orr Ewing Baronetcy, of Ballikinrain in the parish of Killearn in the County of Stirling and of Lennoxbank in the parish of Bonhill in the County of Dunbarton, is created in the Baronetage of the United Kingdom for Conservative politician Archibald Orr-Ewing.
- 15 March – Glasgow City and District Railway, running chiefly in "cut and cover" tunnel, opens.
- 5 April – the Great North of Scotland Railway opens its line through Garmouth, Moray, including its Spey Viaduct over the River Spey with a 350 ft (105 m) main span which is the longest wrought iron arch bridge in Britain.
- 6 May – International Exhibition of Industry, Science and Art opens in The Meadows, Edinburgh. Exhibits include an "Old Edinburgh Street" and displays related to Scotch whisky; Neilson and Company of Glasgow exhibit the Caledonian Railway Single steam locomotive.
- 17 May – Motherwell F.C. founded.
- 25 June – Crofters' Holdings (Scotland) Act grants security of tenure to crofters.
- 1–27 July – in the general election, radical socialist R. B. Cunninghame Graham, standing as a Liberal, wins the North West Lanarkshire seat from the Unionists.
- September – Lieutenant William Henn, R.N. of the Royal Northern Yacht Club with Galatea challenges unsuccessfully for the America's Cup in New York Harbor.
- October – Edinburgh School of Medicine for Women founded by Dr. Sophia Jex-Blake.
- 6 December – the steel-hulled full-rigged ship Balclutha is launched at Charles Connell and Company's yard at Scotstoun for Robert McMillan of Dumbarton. In 1954 she will be laid up as a museum ship in San Francisco.
- The paddle steamers Tewfik and Prince Abbas are built at the newly renamed Fairfield Shipbuilding and Engineering Company's yard at Govan, the first purpose-built boats for Thomas Cook & Son's Nile service.
- Burmah Oil founded as the Rangoon Oil Company in Glasgow by David Sime Cargill.
- Hawick Town Hall, designed by James Campbell Walker, is completed.

== Births ==
- 21 April – Jimmy Gold, comedian (died 1967)
- 13 May – Dot Allan, writer (died 1964)
- 15 May – Helen Cruickshank, poet, suffragette and nationalist (died 1975)
- 23 July – Arthur Whitten Brown, aviator (died 1948 in Wales)
- 31 August – Katherine Watt, nurse (died 1963)
- 1 October – Walter Lyon, lawyer and poet (killed in action 1915)

== Deaths ==
- 17 July – David Stevenson, lighthouse designer (born 1815)
- 20 August – John Small, librarian and scholar (born 1828)
- 26 August – Robert Eden, first Bishop of Moray, Ross and Caithness and Primus of the Scottish Episcopal Church (born 1804 in England)

== The arts ==
- Robert Louis Stevenson's novella Strange Case of Dr Jekyll and Mr Hyde and historical fiction Kidnapped are both first published.
- Mathilde Blind composes the poem "The Heather on Fire".

== See also ==
- Timeline of Scottish history
- 1886 in Ireland
