= 1811 in Scotland =

- Centuries: 17th; 18th; 19th; 20th; 21st
- Decades: 1790s; 1800s; 1810s; 1820s; 1830s
- See also: List of years in Scotland; Timeline of Scottish history 1811 in: The UK • Wales • Elsewhere

Events from the year 1811 in Scotland.

== Incumbents ==
=== Law officers ===
- Lord Advocate – Archibald Colquhoun
- Solicitor General for Scotland – David Boyle; then David Monypenny

=== Judiciary ===
- Lord President of the Court of Session – Lord Avontoun until 20 May; then Lord Granton
- Lord Justice General – The Duke of Montrose
- Lord Justice Clerk – Lord Granton, then Lord Boyle

== Events ==
- 9 January – the first women's golf tournament in Scotland takes place at the links of the Musselburgh Golf Club.
- 1 February – Bell Rock Lighthouse begins operation.
- March – Prisoner-of-war camp established at Penicuik.
- 27 May – second national Census. In Scotland the count is carried out by schoolmasters.
- June – Walter Scott buys the farm at Abbotsford near Galashiels and commences building his future residence, Abbotsford House.
- August – passengers are being carried on the Kilmarnock and Troon Railway, in horse-drawn vehicles.
- November – Thomas Telford's bridge at Bridge of Alford is completed.
- 31 December – Tron riot breaks out in Edinburgh.
- Highland Clearances – the Marquess and Marchioness of Stafford begin mass expulsion of crofting tenants from their Highland estates to make way for sheep farming.
- Glasgow, Paisley and Johnstone Canal completed throughout.
- Helmsdale and Torgoyle Bridges completed to the design of Thomas Telford.
- Inner harbour at Wick completed to the design of Thomas Telford.
- Harbour at Kirkwall (Orkney) first built.
- Harbour at Dunure built at the expense of Archibald Kennedy, 12th Earl of Cassilis. Dunrobin pier is also built about this date.
- Remodelling of the House of the Binns in Scottish Baronial style by William Burn for the Dalyell family.
- Rebuilding of Stobo Castle completed.
- The Edinburgh Society for the Support of Gaelic Schools is established.
- Edinburgh Astronomical Institution established.
- Sinking of a new colliery on the Brora Coalfield is begun.
- Approximate date – John Paton begins his own yarn spinning business in Alloa.

== Births ==
- January – Robert Dick, natural historian (died 1866)
- c. May – Thomas Larkins Walker, architect practicing in England (died 1860 in Hong Kong)
- 7 June – James Simpson, obstetrician and pioneer of anaesthesia (died 1870)
- 13 July – James "paraffin" Young, chemist (died 1883)
- 14 August – Adam Clark, civil engineer (died 1866 in Budapest)
- 12 September – William Bell Scott, artist and poet (died 1890)
- 19 December – Marjorie Fleming, child writer (born 1803)
- 21 December – Archibald Tait, Archbishop of Canterbury (died 1882)
- Christian Maclagan, antiquary (died 1901)

== Deaths ==
- 20 May – Robert Blair, Lord Avontoun, lawyer (born 1741)
- 28 May – Henry Dundas, 1st Viscount Melville, politician (born 1742)
- 14 September – James Grahame, poet, lawyer and clergyman (born 1765)
- 15 October – George Hay, Roman Catholic bishop (born 1729)
- 27 November – Andrew Meikle, mechanical engineer and inventor (born 1719)

== See also ==
- 1811 in Ireland
