= Hosack =

Hosack is a surname. Notable people with the surname include:

- Aaron Hosack (born 1981), American football player
- David Hosack (1769–1835), American physician
- J. C. Hosack, Scottish rugby union player
- John Hosack (1809–1887), Scottish lawyer and historical writer
- Ralph Hosack (born 1935), Canadian boxer
