= 1889 in Scotland =

- Centuries: 17th; 18th; 19th; 20th; 21st
- Decades: 1860s; 1870s; 1880s; 1890s; 1900s
- See also: List of years in Scotland; Timeline of Scottish history 1889 in: The UK • Wales • Elsewhere; Scottish football: 1888–89 • 1889–90

Events from the year 1889 in Scotland.

== Incumbents ==
- Secretary for Scotland and Keeper of the Great Seal – The Marquess of Lothian

=== Law officers ===
- Lord Advocate – James Robertson
- Solicitor General for Scotland – Moir Tod Stormonth Darling

=== Judiciary ===
- Lord President of the Court of Session and Lord Justice General – Lord Glencorse
- Lord Justice Clerk – Lord Kingsburgh

== Events ==
- 26 January – Dundee is granted city status in the United Kingdom by letters patent.
- 5 February – the first issue of Glasgow University Magazine is published.
- 11 March – baby farmer Jessie King is the last woman to be hanged in Edinburgh, for infanticide.
- 24 April – William Henry Bury is hanged in Dundee for uxoricide.
- 15 July – the Scottish National Portrait Gallery opens in Edinburgh in premises designed by Rowand Anderson, the first in the world to be purpose-built as a portrait gallery.
- 26 August – the Local Government (Scotland) Act 1889, receives royal assent. School fees abolished for compulsory education.
- 5 September – Mauricewood Colliery disaster: a fire at the pit near Penicuik kills 63 of the 70 men and boys working underground.
- 1 November – new building under construction at Templeton's Carpet Factory on Glasgow Green collapses killing 29 women in adjacent weaving sheds.
- November - King's Cross Hospital opens in Dundee.

== Births ==
- 7 January – George Samson, sailor, recipient of the Victoria Cross (died at sea 1923)
- 30 May – Isobel Wylie Hutchison, explorer (died 1982)
- 20 July – John Reith, broadcasting executive (died 1971)
- 11 August – Ronald Fairbairn, psychoanalyst (died 1964)
- 25 September – Charles Kenneth Scott Moncrieff, writer (died 1930)
- 1 December – Alexander Keiller, marmalade manufacturer and archaeologist (died 1955)
- John Munro (Iain Rothach), Gaelic poet (killed in action 1918)

== Deaths ==
- 31 May – Horatius Bonar, churchman, writer and hymnodist (born 1808)
- 24 December – Charles Mackay, poet, journalist, author, anthologist, novelist and songwriter (born 1812)

== The arts ==
- Arthur Conan Doyle's novel The Mystery of Cloomber is published.
- Robert Louis Stevenson's novel The Master of Ballantrae is published.
- The Great Scottish National Panorama (Battle of Bannockburn) is opened in Sauchiehall Street, Glasgow.

== See also ==
- Timeline of Scottish history
- 1889 in Ireland
