= 1816 in Scotland =

- Centuries: 17th; 18th; 19th; 20th; 21st
- Decades: 1790s; 1800s; 1810s; 1820s; 1830s
- See also: List of years in Scotland; Timeline of Scottish history 1816 in: The UK • Wales • Elsewhere

Events from the year 1816 in Scotland.

== Incumbents ==
=== Law officers ===
- Lord Advocate – Archibald Colquhoun; then Alexander Maconochie
- Solicitor General for Scotland – Alexander Maconochie; then James Wedderburn

=== Judiciary ===
- Lord President of the Court of Session – Lord Granton
- Lord Justice General – The Duke of Montrose
- Lord Justice Clerk – Lord Boyle

== Events ==
- April – Highland Clearances: Factor Patrick Sellar is tried but acquitted at Inverness of culpable homicide during the mass expulsion of crofting tenants from Strathnaver in 1814.
- 21 May – Highland Society of London (established 1778) incorporated by Act of Parliament.
- 18 June – causeway, bridge and sluice across Loch Fleet at The Mound, designed by Thomas Telford, completed.
- 13 August – an earthquake in Inverness is the strongest ever in Scotland.
- 1 September – the Northern Lighthouse Board's new light on the Isle of May, designed by Robert Stevenson, is completed.
- The Nelson Monument, Edinburgh, on Calton Hill, is completed.
- Logie Bridge at Ferness completed to a design by Telford; as also is the bridge at Contin and the harbour at Portmahomack.
- Suspension footbridge erected over the Gala Water in Galashiels and upper arch bridge at Rumbling Bridge completed.
- David Brewster discovers stress birefringence.
- Rev. Robert Stirling obtains a U.K. patent for the Stirling hot air engine.
- Lagavulin distillery established on Islay.
- St Andrew's Cathedral, Glasgow, is completed as the city's first post-Reformation Roman Catholic church (architect: James Gillespie Graham).
- First Jewish community in Edinburgh in modern times established.
- The Edinburgh Races and Caledonian Hunt are held for the first time at Musselburgh Racecourse rather than on the sands of Leith.

== Births ==
- 5 January
  - James Brunlees, civil engineer (died 1892)
  - Daniel Wilson, archaeologist and academic (died 1892 in Canada)
- 11 January – Henry Robertson, railway promoter (died 1888 in Wales)
- 3 February – Archibald McKellar, politician in Ontario (died 1894 in Canada)
- 14 February – James Morison, evangelical (died 1893)
- 13 June – Charles Alexander, merchant and politician in Quebec (died 1905 in Canada)
- 1 September – James Drummond, historical painter and curator (died 1877)
- 16 September – Theodore Martin, writer (died 1909)
- 30 September – Archibald Sturrock, steam locomotive engineer (died 1909)
- 12 October – Alexander Bryson, scientist (died 1866)

== Deaths ==
- 22 February – Adam Ferguson, philosopher and historian (born 1723)
- 28 February – Archibald Bruce, theologian (born 1746)
- 14 June – Allan Maconochie, jurist (born 1748)
- 25 December – Hercules Ross, merchant in Jamaica (born 1745)

== The arts ==
- Walter Scott's novels The Antiquary, The Black Dwarf and Old Mortality are published.
- The Elgin Marbles are purchased by the British government from Thomas Bruce, 7th Earl of Elgin, for the British Museum in London.

== See also ==
- Timeline of Scottish history
- 1816 in Ireland
