= Tally Toor =

Martello tower in Leith, Edinburgh, Scotland

Coordinates: 55°59′12″N 3°10′24″W

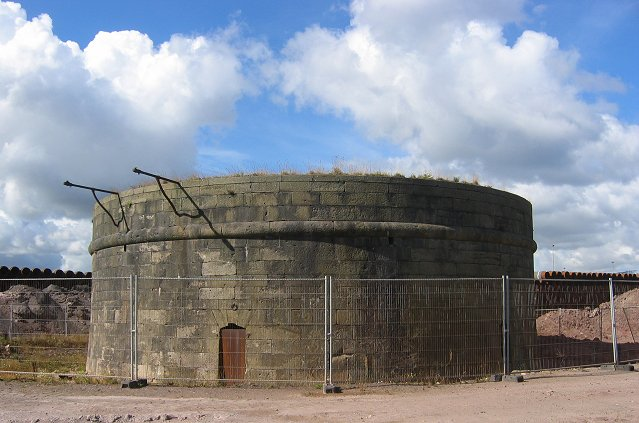
Tally Toor, Leith

The Tally Toor is the local name for a Martello tower in Leith, Edinburgh, Scotland. It is one of Scotland's three Martello towers, the other two being at Hackness and Crockness in Orkney.

Originally built offshore on a rocky outcrop called the Mussel Cape Rocks, or the Martello Rocks. The land around it was subsequently reclaimed, and the building now lies, half-buried, in an industrial area on the eastern breakwater of Leith Docks, approximately 1/4 mile (400 m) east of the present harbour entrance. There is no public access to the tower.

The circular defensive structure was over 30 ft (9.1 m) tall, with walls about 8 ft (2.4 m) thick, constructed of Ashlar from Rosyth quarry.

== History ==
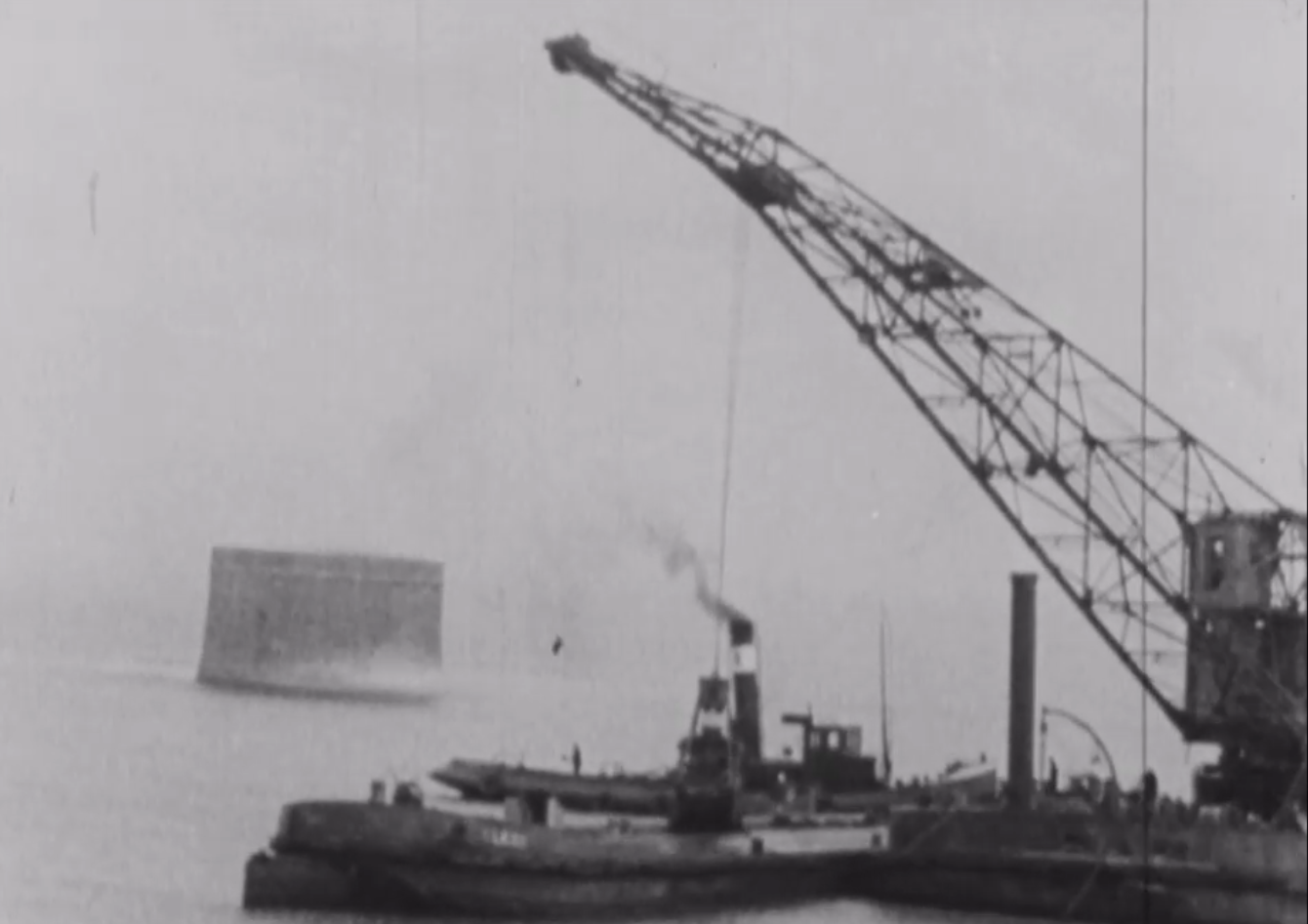
Tally Toor during breakwater construction, 1942

Tally Toor was built in 1809 during the period of the Napoleonic Wars to defend the entrance of Leith Harbour at a cost 17,000 pounds. The tower was altered in 1850 to add a trefoil gun-emplacement and reorganise the interior accommodation.

Irish folk symbols carved on the stonework indicate that it was built by Irish navvies.

Later, during the Second World War, the tower housed an anti-aircraft battery.

On 27 April 1964, it was designated as a Scheduled Ancient Monument by Historic Environment Scotland. Keys to the structure are with Forth Ports.
