= 1969 in Scotland =

- Centuries: 18th; 19th; 20th; 21st
- Decades: 1940s; 1950s; 1960s; 1970s; 1980s
- See also: List of years in Scotland; Timeline of Scottish history 1969 in: The UK • Wales • Elsewhere; Scottish football: 1968–69 • 1969–70; 1969 in Scottish television

Events from the year 1969 in Scotland.

== Incumbents ==
- Secretary of State for Scotland and Keeper of the Great Seal – Willie Ross

=== Law officers ===
- Lord Advocate – Henry Wilson
- Solicitor General for Scotland – Ewan Stewart

=== Judiciary ===
- Lord President of the Court of Session and Lord Justice General – Lord Clyde
- Lord Justice Clerk – Lord Grant
- Chairman of the Scottish Land Court – Lord Birsay

== Events ==
- 6 January – closure of the Waverley Line (the Edinburgh–Galashiels–Hawick–Carlisle railway) and The St. Andrews Railway (the branch line from Leuchars).
- 8 February – unusual aurora borealis seen over Scotland.
- 17 March – the Longhope life-boat in Orkney is lost; the entire crew of 8 dies.
- 27 March – first ordination of a woman in the Church of Scotland, Catherine McConnachie by the Presbytery of Aberdeen.
- 28 April – Gordon Gray, Archbishop of St Andrews and Edinburgh, is elevated to cardinal of the Catholic Church; the first resident cardinal in Scotland for almost 400 years.
- 9 May – formation in Glasgow of the Scottish Minorities Group to campaign for the decriminalisation of gay sexual practices in Scotland.
- 17 May – Scotland beats Cyprus 8–0 in a World Cup Qualifier at Hampden Park.
- May – Ross Pit at Brora is closed by a fire.
- 1 July – John Lennon, Yoko Ono and their children are hospitalised at Golspie following a car accident while on holiday.
- September – the Royal Commission on Local Government in Scotland (chaired by Lord Wheatley) reports, recommending a major reorganisation of local government in Scotland substantially as carried out in 1975 under terms of the Local Government (Scotland) Act 1973.
- 9 October – Backwater Reservoir opened to supply the Dundee area.
- 30 October – Glasgow Gorbals by-election: Labour retains the seat but the SNP takes second place from the Conservatives.
- 30 December – the Linwood bank robbery occurs in Linwood, Renfrewshire and three police officers are shot in the aftermath, two fatally.
- The policies of Culzean Castle become Scotland's first country park.

== Births ==
- 1 January
  - Paul Lawrie, golfer and journalist
  - Tom Urie, actor
- 13 January – Stephen Hendry, snooker player
- 6 March – Neil Findlay, Labour Party Member of the Scottish Parliament
- 28 March – Laurie Brett, actress
- April – Kenny Alexander, businessman
- 24 April
  - Donna Robertson, judoka and wrestler
  - Fiona Robertson, judoka and wrestler
  - Eilidh Whiteford, Scottish National Party Member of Parliament
- 11 August – Ashley Jensen, actress
- 25 August – Catriona Matthew, golfer
- 28 September – Angus Robertson, Scottish National Party Member of Parliament
- 13 November – Gerard Butler, actor
- 5 December – Lynne Ramsay film director, writer, producer, and cinematographer best known for the films Ratcatcher, Morvern Callar and We Need to Talk about Kevin
- 7 December – James Murray, boxer (died 1995)
- 18 December – Irvin Duguid, keyboard player (Stiltskin)
- 24 December – Mark Millar, comic book writer
- 31 December – Dominik Diamond, presenter and newspaper columnist

== Deaths ==
- 22 February – Jock Cunningham, soldier, mutineer, Republican lieutenant colonel in Spanish civil War (born 1902)
- 8 May – Sir Sydney Smith, forensic pathologist (born 1883 in New Zealand)
- 10 May – John Bannerman, Baron Bannerman of Kildonan, international rugby player and Liberal politician (born 1901)
- 7 September – Gavin Maxwell, naturalist and author (born 1914)
- 6 December – Florence Horsbrugh, Baroness Horsbrugh, Scottish Unionist Party and Conservative Party politician (born 1889)

== The arts ==
- George Mackay Brown's short stories A Time to Keep and collected writings An Orkney Tapestry are published.
- Jenny Gilbertson's documentary film Shetland Pony is made.
- Tom Leonard's Six Glasgow Poems are published.
- The cultural magazine New Edinburgh Review begins publication.
- Antonia Fraser's biography Mary Queen of Scots is published.

== See also ==
- 1969 in Northern Ireland
