= 1887 in Scotland =

- Centuries: 17th; 18th; 19th; 20th; 21st
- Decades: 1860s; 1870s; 1880s; 1890s; 1900s
- See also: List of years in Scotland; Timeline of Scottish history 1887 in: The UK • Wales • Elsewhere; Scottish football: 1886–87 • 1887–88

Events from the year 1887 in Scotland.

== Incumbents ==
- Secretary for Scotland and Keeper of the Great Seal – Arthur Balfour until 11 March; then The Marquess of Lothian

=== Law officers ===
- Lord Advocate – John Macdonald
- Solicitor General for Scotland – James Robertson

=== Judiciary ===
- Lord President of the Court of Session and Lord Justice General – Lord Glencorse
- Lord Justice Clerk – Lord Moncreiff

== Events ==
- 1 April – Glasgow Botanic Gardens management taken over by town council.
- 26 April – the America's Cup challenging yacht Thistle, designed by George Lennox Watson, is launched at D. and W. Henderson and Company's yard at Partick.
- 28 May – Udston mining disaster in Hamilton, South Lanarkshire, Scotland: 73 coal miners die in a firedamp explosion at Udston Colliery.
- 7 June – the first (temporary) North Carr Lightship is moored on station.
- July – James Blyth operates the world's first working wind turbine at Marykirk.
- November – Park Deer Raid in the Outer Hebrides: a mass poaching expedition by dispossessed crofters turns into a riot.
- 17 December – Warrender Baths opened in the Marchmont district of Edinburgh.
- 25 December – Glenfiddich single malt Scotch whisky first distilled.
- December – The Scots Magazine resumes publication in Perth.
- The Old Blacksmith's Shop at Gretna Green is promoted as a visitor attraction.
- J. & P. Coats build their No. 1 cotton spinning mill at Ferguslie, Paisley.
- Scottish Co-operative Wholesale Society complex at Shieldhall, Glasgow, begins functioning as the world's first comprehensive industrial estate.
- William Ivison Macadam publishes "Notes on the Ancient Iron Industry of Scotland" in Proceedings of the Society of Antiquaries of Scotland.

== Sport ==
- 13 August – Hibernian F.C. defeats English team Preston North End to win the 'Championship of the World', after the two teams win the Association football Cup competitions in their respective countries.
- 6 November – The Association football club Celtic F.C. is formed in Glasgow by Irish Marist Brother Walfrid, to help alleviate poverty in the city's East End by raising money for his charity, the 'Poor Children's Dinner Table'.

== Births ==
- 25 March – E.S. Russell, marine biologist (died 1954 in England)
- 29 April – Stanley Cursiter, painter and curator (died 1976)
- 15 May – Edwin Muir, poet (died 1959 in England)
- 9 July – Dòmhnall Ruadh Chorùna, poet (died 1967)
- 29 July – William Graham, Labour MP for Edinburgh Central (1918–1931) (died 1932)
- 27 August – James Finlayson, comic film actor (died 1953 in the United States)
- 16 August – Agnes Dollan, suffragette, political activist and leader of the Glasgow rent strikes (died 1966)
- 11 September – Isabel Emslie Hutton, nurse in Serbia during World War I and psychiatrist (died 1960)

== Deaths ==
- 8 May – Thomas Stevenson, lighthouse designer and meteorologist (born 1818)
- 18 August – George Loch, Liberal Party Member of Parliament for Wick (1868–72) (born 1811)
- 18 September – Helen Acquroff, pianist, singer, poet and music teacher (born 1831)

== The arts ==
- 5 November – Hamish MacCunn's concert overture The Land of the Mountain and the Flood is first performed.
- November – Arthur Conan Doyle's first detective novel, A Study in Scarlet, is published (in Beeton's Christmas Annual), introducing London consulting detective Sherlock Holmes and his friend and chronicler Dr. Watson.
- The Castellated and Domestic Architecture of Scotland is published by Scottish architects David MacGibbon and Thomas Ross.

== See also ==
- Timeline of Scottish history
- 1887 in Ireland
