= 1966 in Scotland =

- Centuries: 18th; 19th; 20th; 21st
- Decades: 1940s; 1950s; 1960s; 1970s; 1980s
- See also: List of years in Scotland; Timeline of Scottish history 1966 in: The UK • Wales • Elsewhere; Scottish football: 1965–66 • 1966–67; 1966 in Scottish television

Events from the year 1966 in Scotland.

== Incumbents ==
- Secretary of State for Scotland and Keeper of the Great Seal – Willie Ross

=== Law officers ===
- Lord Advocate – Gordon Stott
- Solicitor General for Scotland – Henry Wilson

=== Judiciary ===
- Lord President of the Court of Session and Lord Justice General – Lord Clyde
- Lord Justice Clerk – Lord Grant
- Chairman of the Scottish Land Court – Lord Birsay

== Events ==
- 1 February – Heriot-Watt College in Edinburgh is designated Heriot-Watt University.
- 9 February – construction of a prototype fast breeder nuclear reactor at Dounreay on the north coast of Scotland is announced.
- 28 March – Ballachulish branch railway officially closed; Connel Bridge becomes a road-only crossing.
- 11 April (Easter Monday) – Scottish clearing banks observe today as a bank holiday for the first time, aligning them with those in England.
- May
  - Pioneering west coast roll-on/roll-off ferry Isle of Gigha enters service.
  - Royal Commission on Local Government in Scotland (chaired by Lord Wheatley) appointed.
- 27 June
  - Glasgow Airport officially opened by Queen Elizabeth II.
  - Glasgow St Enoch railway station officially closed.
- 18 July – Old Man of Hoy first climbed, by Chris Bonington, Rusty Baillie and Tom Patey.
- 18 August – the Tay Road Bridge opens linking Dundee with Fife.
- 29 August – Scottish clearing banks observe this last Monday in August (rather than the first) as a bank holiday for the first time.
- 28 October – first Red Road Flats in Glasgow officially opened.
- 9 November – Irvine is designated as a New Town.
- 11 November – MV Isle of Gigha capsizes on a Gigha–Port Ellen crossing.
- Scottish Grand National first run at Ayr Racecourse.

== Births ==
- March – Jamie Oag, entrepreneur
- 18 March – Joanna Cherry, Scottish National Party politician and lawyer
- 28 May – Roddy Lumsden, poet (died 2020)
- 7 August – David Cairns, Scottish Labour politician, Parliamentary Under-Secretary of State for Scotland and MP for Inverclyde (died 2011)
- 20 September – Douglas Gordon, visual artist
- 12 October – Rhona Martin, curler
- 26 October – Steve Valentine, actor
- 8 November – Gordon Ramsay, celebrity chef
- 23 November – Kevin Gallacher, international footballer
- Laura Hird, fiction writer

== Deaths ==
- 1 January – Alexander Carrick, sculptor (born 1882)
- 7 January – Allan Chapman, lawyer and politician (born 1897)
- 16 July – Agnes Dollan, suffragette, political activist and leader of the Glasgow Rent Strikes (born 1887)
- 6 November – Hugh Fraser, 1st Baron Fraser of Allander, retailer (born 1903)
- 24 December – Sir Donald MacGillivray, last colonial governor of Malaya (born 1906)

== The arts ==
- 7 January – school-based television drama series This Man Craig is first screened by BBC Scotland with John Cairney in the title rôle.
- The Bay City Rollers and The Incredible String Band form in Edinburgh.

== See also ==
- 1966 in Northern Ireland
