= 1881 in Scotland =

- Centuries: 17th; 18th; 19th; 20th; 21st
- Decades: 1860s; 1870s; 1880s; 1890s; 1900s
- See also: List of years in Scotland; Timeline of Scottish history 1881 in: The UK • Wales • Elsewhere; Scottish football: 1880–81 • 1881–82

Events from the year 1881 in Scotland.

== Incumbents ==
=== Law officers ===
- Lord Advocate – John McLaren until August; then John Blair Balfour
- Solicitor General for Scotland – John Blair Balfour; then Alexander Asher

=== Judiciary ===
- Lord President of the Court of Session and Lord Justice General – Lord Glencorse
- Lord Justice Clerk – Lord Moncreiff

== Events ==
- 1 March – the Cunard Line's SS Servia, the first steel transatlantic liner, is launched at J. & G. Thomson's shipyard at Clydebank.
- 1 July – formation, under the Childers Reforms of the British Army, of the Argyll and Sutherland Highlanders, Cameronians (Scottish Rifles), Gordon Highlanders, Highland Light Infantry and Seaforth Highlanders.
- 20/21 July – 58 men, the crews of ten fishing boats (mostly sixareens) from Yell, Shetland, are drowned in a sudden storm.
- 25 August – Edinburgh Royal Review of Volunteers ("The Wet Review"): Large numbers of Volunteer Forces from all over Scotland parade before Queen Victoria in Holyrood Park on a day of prolonged heavy rainfall.
- 14 October – the Eyemouth disaster ("Black Friday"): a severe storm strikes the Berwickshire coast; 189 fishermen die.
- 21 December – the Aberdeen Line's SS Aberdeen, the first oceangoing ship successfully powered by a triple expansion steam engine, designed by Alexander Carnegie Kirk, is launched at Robert Napier and Sons' yard at Govan.
- The remains of Alexander Lindsay, 25th Earl of Crawford (died 1880), are stolen from the family crypt on the Dunecht estate.
- Memorial cairn erected at the site of the Battle of Culloden (1746).
- Bruichladdich distillery established on the Rinns of Islay.
- Clydebank Co-operative Society formed.
- Inverness Museum and Art Gallery originally opened.
- Fettesian-Lorettonian Club established as a joint sporting club of the two named Edinburgh public schools, primarily for the playing of rugby union.

== Births ==
- 29 March – Charles Jarvis, soldier, Victoria Cross recipient (died 1948)
- 6 August – Alexander Fleming, biologist, pharmacologist and botanist (died 1955 in England)
- 2 November – Tom Johnston, socialist politician (died 1965)
- 6 November – Alfred David McAlpine, civil engineering contractor (died 1944)
- 1 December – Alastair Denniston, cryptanalyst (died 1961 in England)
- 25 December – Willie Gallacher, trade unionist and communist MP (died 1965)

== Deaths ==
- 22 August – John Hill Burton, advocate, historian and economist (born 1809)
- 30 October – William Brodie, sculptor (born 1815)
- 31 October – Alexander Macdonald, miner, trade unionist and Lib–Lab MP (born 1821)

== See also ==
- Timeline of Scottish history
- 1881 in Ireland
