= Molly Harrison (curator) =

Museum curator and author (1909–2002)

Molly Harrison MBE FRSE
- Born: Molly Hodgett; 23 September 1909; Great Wymondley, Hertfordshire, England
- Died: 7 August 2002 (aged 92); Whitchurch-on-Thames, Oxfordshire, England
- Citizenship: United Kingdom
- Education: Friends' School, Saffron Walden
- Alma mater: Sorbonne
- Occupations: Museum curator; Author
- Years active: 1939–1980s
- Spouse: Gordon Harrison (m. 1940)
- Children: 3

Molly Harrison MBE FRSE (née Hodgett; 23 September 1909 – 7 August 2002) was an English museum curator and author who was curator of the Geffrye Museum from 1941 to 1969. She added the museum's first modern room in her belief history did not end at the Victorian era and came up with hand-written and illustrated information items. Harrison was an extensive publisher of children's and adult books and frequently gave lectures at universities in the United Kingdom and abroad. She was appointed Member of the Order of the British Empire (MBE) in 1967 and was made a Fellow of the Royal Society of Arts a year later.

== Early life ==
Harrison's birth was on 23 September 1909, at the Old Thatched Cottage, Great Wymondley in Hertfordshire. She was the daughter of the bank manager Ernest Charles Hodgett and his wife Ethel Alma. Since her parents worked on the Gold Coast, Queensland, Harrison was primarily raised by relatives. She went to the Friends' School, Saffron Walden, and was heavily influenced by her history master. Harrison went on to be educated at a Belgian convent and then spent one year at Paris' Sorbonne. She did not obtain any educational degrees.

== Career ==
Upon coming back to England, Harrison briefly worked as a secretary, before enrolling on a teacher training course at the Avery Hill teacher training college in South London. She had a spell teaching English and French at some secondary schools in North London, and made her first application to be a teacher to the Geffrye in a deprived area of the capital in 1938 but was not successful. Harrison's second application was successful the year after and was appointed the Geffrye's assistant curator during the early period of the Second World War. She made it known she would work at the museum for two years before travelling to Africa. When the Second World War broke out, the curator of Geffrye and aristocrat Marjorie Quennell was evacuated to the United States, temporarily handing over curator duties to Harrison in 1941. Harrison was appointed to the position of curator permanently in 1946.

She observed that most visitors to the Geffrye were children on school visits or holidaying with their parents. Harrison noted the best way children were learning was through drawing, making and observing. She stressed the Geffrye was not solely a museum for children but also for adults as well and disliked the American trend of setting up individual children's museums. Harrison allowed people from all social classes and children and excluded none from entering the museum. She added the museum's first modern room to comply with her belief history in such places needed to be extended beyond the Victorian era. Harrison came up with hand-written and illustrated information panels on walls as well as collages, games and timelines. When the museum was closed from 1950 to 1951 for war-time damage repairs, she took the time to adjust the museum's rooms and make the public facilities better, which included the addition of her office at the entrance to allow her to hear and observe visitors. Harrison was a panellist in a 1958 episode of the gameshow Animal, Vegetable, Mineral?.

She was an extensive publisher of multiple children's and adult books and frequently gave lectures at universities in the United Kingdom and abroad. In 1950, Harrison authored the educational textbook Museum Adventures: The Story of the Geffrye Museum. She co-authored with Germaine Cart and Charles Russell Museums and Young People: Three Reports for the International Council of Museums two years later, and was appointed a member of the Council of Industrial Design in 1953. Harrison wrote seven Picture Source Books for Social History with Anne A.M Wells, O.M. Royston and Margaret E. Bryant from 1953 to 1967. She lobbied London County Council for multiple years to allow for the construction of a modern Design Centre extension to the Geffrye to display contemporary home furniture but bureaucracy and lack of funding prevented this from happening.

Harrison retired to the Berkshire countryside in 1969 and remained quite active. She learnt to drive; was a zealous gardener that saw her open the garden at her home up to the public and attended yoga classes. Harrison was a member of the Society of Authors' management committee between 1969 and 1970. She went on to serve as its chair of educational writers group from 1970 to 1971. Harrison was also a fellow of the Museums Association. She continued to write about subjects she was found of during her time at Geffrye Museum. This included People and Furniture: A Social Background to the English Home in 1971, The Kitchen in History in 1972 and Growing up in Victorian Times in 1980.

== Awards ==
She was appointed Member of the Order of the British Empire (MBE) in 1967. The following year, Harrison was made a Fellow of the Royal Society of Arts.

== Personal life ==
On 24 February 1940, she married the research pharmacist Gordon Harrison. They had three daughters. Harrison died from hypertension at her home in Whitchurch-on-Thames in Oxfordshire on 7 August 2002.

== Appearance and legacy ==
Gene Adams of The Guardian described her as "a thin, rather wiry, figure, with well-defined features, an attractive smile, grey hair smartly permed, and piercing blue eyes." The Times noted: "During the course of her long career she was instrumental in developing the concept of educational work, and many of her innovative ideas are now common practice in museums around the country." The National Portrait Gallery, London has held a quarter-plate glass negative photograph of Harrison taken in May 1951 by Elliott & Fry in its photographs collection since 1974. In May 2021, a café called Molly's Café opened in Hoxton was named after her.
