= 1967 in Scottish television =

This is a list of events in Scottish television from 1967.

== Events ==
- 16 July - Scottish Television airs the documentary The Bowler and the Bunnet, directed and presented by Sean Connery. It is the only film ever directed by Connery.
- 31 August - Tenth anniversary of Scottish Television.

== Television series ==
- Scotsport (1957–2008)
- The White Heather Club (1958–1968)
- Dr. Finlay's Casebook (1962–1971)
- The Adventures of Francie and Josie (1962–1970)

== Births ==
- 1 January - Sharon Small, actress
- 11 January - Derek Riddell, actor
- 2 March - Ian Oliver, author and broadcaster (died 2022)
- 11 March - John Barrowman, Scottish-American actor
- 17 April - Henry Ian Cusick, actor

== See also ==
- 1967 in Scotland
