= 1885 in Scotland =

- Centuries: 17th; 18th; 19th; 20th; 21st
- Decades: 1860s; 1870s; 1880s; 1890s; 1900s
- See also: List of years in Scotland; Timeline of Scottish history 1885 in: The UK • Wales • Elsewhere; Scottish football: 1884–85 • 1885–86

Events from the year 1885 in Scotland.

== Incumbents ==
- Secretary for Scotland and Keeper of the Great Seal – from 17 August The Duke of Richmond

=== Law officers ===
- Lord Advocate – John Blair Balfour until July; then John Macdonald
- Solicitor General for Scotland – Alexander Asher; then James Robertson

=== Judiciary ===
- Lord President of the Court of Session and Lord Justice General – Lord Glencorse
- Lord Justice Clerk – Lord Moncreiff

== Events ==
- 18 April – Scottish Catholic Observer first published as The Glasgow Observer.
- 1 June – the Glasgow and South Western Railway's Largs Branch is completed throughout to Largs.
- 10 June – breed standard for Highland cattle first defined (in Inverness) and herd book first produced.
- 27 June – The Shetland News first published in Lerwick.
- 1 July – the Glasgow and South Western Railway's Paisley Canal Line is opened on the course of the abandoned Glasgow, Paisley and Johnstone Canal.
- 6 August – the Portpatrick and Wigtownshire Joint Railway is officially formed, in the joint ownership of the Caledonian, Glasgow and South Western, London and North Western and Midland Railways.
- 17 August – the post of Secretary for Scotland is revived to be in charge of the Scottish Office, Charles Gordon-Lennox, 6th Duke of Richmond, being the first appointee.
- 1 October – the Alloa Railway's Alloa swing bridge over the River Forth is opened.
- 24 November – 18 December: 1885 United Kingdom general election: five MPs from or allied with the Crofters Party are elected.
- General Accident and Employers' Liability Assurance Association Ltd., a predecessor of Aviva, established in Perth.
- Ailsa Shipbuilding Company established at Troon.
- North British Distillery established in Edinburgh.
- Scapa distillery established on Mainland, Orkney.
- Hugh Tennent first brews lager at the Wellpark Brewery, Glasgow.
- Experimental hydroelectricity scheme for public supply at Greenock initiated.
- Fidra lighthouse built.

== Births ==
- 21 January – Duncan Grant, painter (died 1978 in England)
- 16 February – Will Fyffe, music hall entertainer (died 1947)
- 23 March – John Fraser, surgeon and academic (died 1947)
- 8 April – John Kerr, cricketer (died 1972)
- 29 April – Andrew Young, poet and clergyman (died 1971 in England)
- 22 June – James Maxton, socialist and leader of the Independent Labour Party (died 1946)
- 8 September – Douglas Guthrie, otolaryngologist and medical historian (died 1975)
- 13 September – John Beazley, Classical archaeologist (died 1970)
- 1 October – William Miller Macmillan, colonial historian (died 1974 in England)
- F. Marian McNeill, folklorist (died 1973)
- Winifred Rushforth, née Bartholomew, psychoanalyst (died 1983)

== Deaths ==
- 2 April – James Edward Alexander, soldier, traveller and author (born 1803)
- 16 July – William Graham, wine merchant, art patron and Liberal politician (born 1817)

== The arts ==
- "Glasgow Boys" first exhibit collectively, at the Glasgow Institute of the Fine Arts.
- Aberdeen Art Gallery opens.
- English painter Fra Newbery is appointed Principal of Glasgow School of Art, where he will serve until 1917.

== Sport ==
=== Seasons ===
- 1884–85 and 1885–86 Scottish Cups (Association football)
- 1884–85 and 1885–86 British Home Championships (Association football)
- 1885 Open Championship (golf) on the Old Course at St Andrews
- 1885 Home Nations Championship (rugby union)

=== Events ===
- May – Clydesdale Harriers established in Glasgow as Scotland's first open amateur athletics club.
- 12 September – Arbroath 36–0 Bon Accord is the world's highest scoring unrigged professional Association football match. An official score of Dundee Harp 35–0 Aberdeen Rovers is recorded in a separate match on the same day.

=== Establishments ===
- Caledonian F.C., Inverness
- Clachnacuddin F.C., Inverness
- Clackmannan F.C.
- Cronberry Eglinton F.C.
- Dundee Wanderers F.C.
- Dunfermline Athletic F.C.
- Forfar Athletic F.C.
- Glenurquhart Shinty Club
- Inverness Thistle F.C.
- Lanemark F.C., New Cumnock
- Lesmahagow F.C.
- Orion F.C., Aberdeen
- St Johnstone F.C., Perth (officially formed 24 February, though its origins and founding date is 1884)
- Wishaw F.C.

=== Closures ===
- Eastern F.C.

== See also ==
- Timeline of Scottish history
- 1885 in Ireland
