= 1888 in Scotland =

- Centuries: 17th; 18th; 19th; 20th; 21st
- Decades: 1860s; 1870s; 1880s; 1890s; 1900s
- See also: List of years in Scotland; Timeline of Scottish history 1888 in: The UK • Wales • Elsewhere; Scottish football: 1887–88 • 1888–89

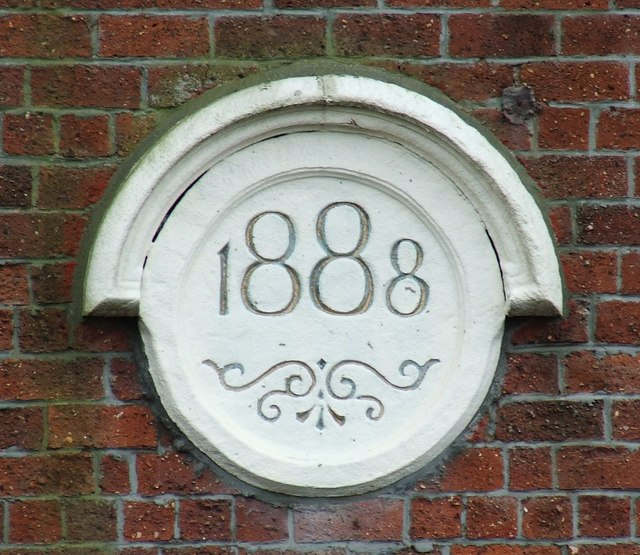
Date stone on the west gable of Coatbridge Sunnyside station

Events from the year 1888 in Scotland.

== Incumbents ==
- Secretary for Scotland and Keeper of the Great Seal – The Marquess of Lothian

=== Law officers ===
- Lord Advocate – John Macdonald until October; then James Robertson
- Solicitor General for Scotland – James Robertson; then Moir Tod Stormonth Darling

=== Judiciary ===
- Lord President of the Court of Session and Lord Justice General – Lord Glencorse
- Lord Justice Clerk – Lord Moncreiff, then Lord Kingsburgh

== Events ==
- 9 January – Crofters War: Aignish riot – Dispossessed crofters on Lewis face armed troops.
- 15 March – transatlantic liner SS City of New York is launched at John Brown & Company's shipyard at Clydebank.
- 8 May–November – International Exhibition of Science, Art and Industry at Kelvingrove Park, Glasgow.
- July–August – first "Race to the North": Operators of the West and East Coast Main Line railways accelerate their services between London and Edinburgh.
- 28 May – Celtic Football Club play their first official match, beating Rangers 5–2 in Glasgow.
- 25 August – first Scottish Labour Party founded.
- 24 September – Stock exchange opened at Greenock.
- 15 October – Dundee Institute of Technology, predecessor of Abertay University, opens.
- c. December – completion of first stage of Edinburgh Museum of Science and Art.
- Lancashire textile machinery manufacturer John Bullough purchases the isle of Rùm.
- Opening of Carstairs House Tramway, a private railway powered by hydroelectricity and the first permanent electric railway in Scotland.

== Births ==
- 3 January – James Bridie (O. H. Mavor), playwright (died 1951)
- 13 February – Andrew Dewar Gibb, lawyer and Scottish National Party politician (died 1974)
- 8 March – John Nicholson, footballer (died 1970 in England)
- 19 April – Walter Elliot, Unionist politician (died 1958)
- 6 June – Scottie Wilson, né Louis Freeman, artist (died 1972 in England)
- 7 June – Hilda Matheson, pioneering radio talks producer, born in London (died 1940 in England)
- 7 July – Edith Hughes, née Burnet, architect (died 1971)
- 14 August – John Logie Baird, engineer and inventor (died 1946)
- 5 September – Jack Miles, General Secretary of the Communist Party of Australia (died 1969 in Australia)
- 7 October – Cecil Coles, composer (killed in action 1918)
- Approximate date – Alexander MacRae, clothing manufacturer (died 1938 in Australia)

== Deaths ==
- 10 January – James Campbell Walker, Scottish architect (born 1821)
- May – James Salmon, architect (born 1805)
- 30 May – William Hay, architect (born 1818)
- 4 August – Lord Douglas Gordon, Liberal MP (born 1851)

== Art ==
J. M. Barrie's Auld Licht Idylls is published.

== See also ==
- Timeline of Scottish history
- 1888 in Ireland
