= Samuel Morison Brown =

Scottish chemist and essayist (1817–1856)

Samuel Morison Brown (February 23 1817 – 20 September 1856), Scottish chemist, poet and essayist.

== Life ==
Brown was born at Haddington, East Lothian, the fourth son of Samuel Brown, the founder of itinerating libraries, and grandson of John Brown, author of the Self-Interpreting Bible. In 1832, he entered the university of Edinburgh, where, after studying in Berlin and St. Petersburg, he graduated as MD in 1839.

About 1840, he was engaged in experiments by which he sought to prove that carbon in certain states of combination is susceptible of conversion into silicon, and his failure to establish this proposition had much to do with his want of success as a candidate for the chair of chemistry at Edinburgh in 1843.

He held the doctrine that the chemical elements are compounds of equal and similar atoms, and might therefore possibly be all derived from one generic atom. In 1850 he published a tragedy, Galileo Galilei, and two volumes of his Lectures on the Atomic Theory and Essays Scientific and Literary appeared in 1858, with a preface by his kinsman Dr. John Brown, the author of Horae Subsecivae.

He was also the author of "Lay sermons on the Theory of Christianity."

He died in Edinburgh.

== Sources ==
- This article incorporates text from a publication now in the public domain: Henderson, Thomas Finlayson (1886). "Brown, Samuel (1817-1856)". In Stephen, Leslie (ed.). Dictionary of National Biography. Vol. 7. London: Smith, Elder & Co.
