= 1969 in Scottish television =

This is a list of events in Scottish television from 1969.

== Events ==
=== January to August ===
- No events.

=== September ===
- Reporting Scotland is integrated into the networked Nationwide strand.

=== October ===
- Scottish Television starts broadcasting in colour unofficially. Official colour service starts from the Black Hill transmitter on 13 December 1969.
- Secondary studios for Scottish Television open at the Gateway Theatre on Leith Walk in Edinburgh.

=== November ===
- 3 November – A serious fire puts Scottish Television's main studio, Studio A, out of action.

=== December ===
- No events.

== Television series ==
- Scotsport (1957–2008)
- Dr. Finlay's Casebook (1962–1971)
- The Adventures of Francie and Josie (1962–1970)
- Reporting Scotland (1968–1983; 1984–present)

== Births ==
- 28 March - Laurie Brett, actress
- 24 April - Rory McCann, actor
- 8 May - Michael E. Rodgers, actor
- 15 May - Craig Oliver, journalist, media executive and British government Director of Communications
- 10 August - Ashley Jensen, actress
- 28 August - Tom Cowan, football journalist
- 5 September - Tom Vaughan, film and television director
- 13 November - Gerard Butler, actor
- 13 December - Tony Curran, actor
- 30 December - Kathleen MacInnes, singer, actress and television presenter
- Unknown - Heather Reid, meteorologist and weather presenter

== See also ==
- 1969 in Scotland
