= 1966 in Scottish television =

This is a list of events in Scottish television from 1966.

== Events ==
- 31 March - Television coverage of the 1966 general election.
- 2 April - Scottish Television and Grampian Television show live coverage of a Scotland home international for the first time, as England win 4-3 at Hampden.
- Unknown - Scottish Television is listed on the London Stock Exchange.

== Television series ==
- Scotsport (1957–2008)
- The White Heather Club (1958–1968)
- Dr. Finlay's Casebook (1962–1971)
- The Adventures of Francie and Josie (1962–1970)

== Births ==
- 13 January - Gavin Mitchell, actor
- 28 June - Sara Stewart, actress
- 15 October - Dougie Vipond, musician and actor
- Unknown - Colin Buchanan, actor

== See also ==
- 1966 in Scotland
