= 1878 in Scotland =

- Centuries: 17th; 18th; 19th; 20th; 21st
- Decades: 1850s; 1860s; 1870s; 1880s; 1890s
- See also: List of years in Scotland; Timeline of Scottish history 1878 in: The UK • Wales • Elsewhere; Scottish football: 1877–78 • 1878–79

Events from the year 1878 in Scotland.

== Incumbents ==
=== Law officers ===
- Lord Advocate – William Watson
- Solicitor General for Scotland – John Macdonald

=== Judiciary ===
- Lord President of the Court of Session and Lord Justice General – Lord Glencorse
- Lord Justice Clerk – Lord Moncreiff

== Events ==
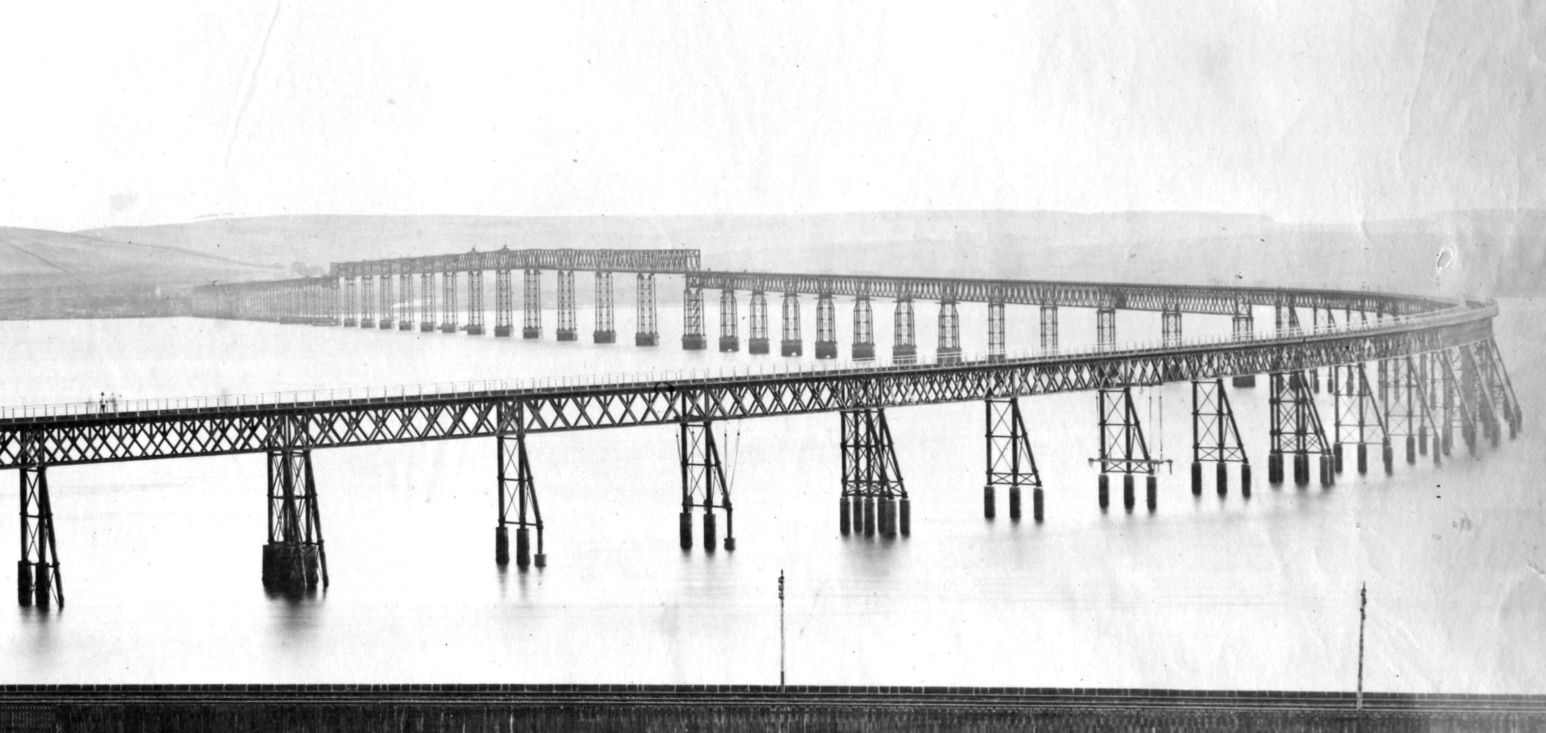
Original Tay Bridge from the north

- 14 January – Alexander Graham Bell demonstrates the telephone to Queen Victoria.
- 15 March – restoration of the Scottish hierarchy of the Roman Catholic Church, carried out on the instructions of the newly appointed Pope Leo XIII.
- 31 May – the North British Railway's first Tay Bridge across the Firth of Tay is ceremonially opened, its engineer, Thomas Bouch, being made a burgess of Dundee. Designed in iron to replace a train ferry, it is the world's longest bridge at this date.
- 12 December – the iron-hulled full-rigged ship Falls of Clyde is launched at Russell & Company's yard at Port Glasgow for Wright and Breakenridge's Glasgow-based Falls Line. In 1968 she will be laid up as a museum ship in Honolulu.
- Sophia Jex-Blake sets up in practice in Edinburgh as the city's first woman doctor.
- The hydropathic establishment in Moffat is opened.
- Construction of forts on Inchkeith begins.
- West coast shipping operator David Hutcheson & Co. passes wholly to control of David MacBrayne.
- The sanitary porcelainware works at Barrhead that becomes part of Armitage Shanks is established.

== Births ==
- 20 January – Finlay Currie, actor (died 1968 in England)
- 23 March – Muirhead Bone, graphic artist (died 1953 in England)
- 12 April – Alex McDonald, footballer (died 1949)
- 24 July – Louisa Jordan, nurse (died 1915 in Serbia)
- 10 August – Louis Esson, poet and playwright (died 1943 in Australia)
- 14 December – James Greenlees, rugby union footballer, educationalist and soldier (died 1951)
- Robert Freeman, Baptist minister in the United States
- George Wittet, architect (died 1926 in Bombay)

== Deaths ==
- 26 January – Kirkpatrick Macmillan, inventor of the bicycle (born 1812)
- 19 February – George Paul Chalmers, painter (born 1833; died as the result of a street attack)
- 6 June – Robert Stirling, Church of Scotland minister and inventor of the Stirling engine (born 1790)
- 13 August – George Gilfillan, writer and poet (born 1813)
- 5 December – George Whyte-Melville, novelist and poet (born 1821)
- 31 December – James Matheson, Member of Parliament and co-founder of Jardine, Matheson & Co. (born 1796)

== The arts ==
- July – William McGonagall journeys on foot from Dundee to Balmoral Castle over mountainous terrain and through a violent thunderstorm in a fruitless attempt to perform his verse before Queen Victoria.

== See also ==
- Timeline of Scottish history
- 1878 in Ireland
