= 1884 in Scotland =

- Centuries: 17th; 18th; 19th; 20th; 21st
- Decades: 1860s; 1870s; 1880s; 1890s; 1900s
- See also: List of years in Scotland; Timeline of Scottish history 1884 in: The UK • Wales • Elsewhere; Scottish football: 1883–84 • 1884–85

Events from the year 1884 in Scotland.

== Incumbents ==
=== Law officers ===
- Lord Advocate – John Blair Balfour
- Solicitor General for Scotland – Alexander Asher

=== Judiciary ===
- Lord President of the Court of Session and Lord Justice General – Lord Glencorse
- Lord Justice Clerk – Lord Moncreiff

== Events ==
- 26 January – Scotland beat Ireland 5-0 in the first match of the first British Home Championship in Association football.
- 15 March – Scotland beat England 1-0 in their second match of the British Home Championship.
- 29 March – Scotland beat Wales 4-1 to win the first British Home Championship.
- 28 April – Napier Commission delivers the Report of Her Majesty's Commissioners of Inquiry Into the Condition of the Crofters and Cottars in the Highlands and Islands of Scotland.
- 12 June – Pier terminal opened at Rothesay, Bute.
- 1 July – First International Forestry Exhibition opens at Donaldson's Hospital, Edinburgh, during which an electric railway is demonstrated.
- 17 July – Barque Vicksburg of Leith goes aground on Muckle Skerry in the Pentland Skerries with the loss of nine lives; twelve are saved by the island's lighthouse keepers.
- Autumn – Origin of St Johnstone F.C. in Perth.
- 2 November – Fourteen people are killed when some of the audience at the Star Theatre, Glasgow, panic following a false fire alarm.
- 11 November – Blackford Hill is acquired by the city of Edinburgh.
- 18 November – Crofters War: Royal Marines and police arrive in naval ships at Uig, Skye, following an unsuccessful attempt to evict tenants engaging in a rent strike against Major William Fraser, owner of the Kilmuir Estate and Uig Tower.
- 1 December – Edinburgh Suburban and Southside Junction Railway opens to passengers.
- 6 December – Representation of the People Act 1884 extends the franchise to many crofters.
- Teacher's Highland Cream blended whisky registered.

== Births ==
- 11 February – Joseph Westwood, Labour MP (1922–31 and 1935–48) and Secretary of State for Scotland (1945–1947) (died 1948)
- 24 February – William Theodore Heard, Cardinal of the Roman Catholic church (died 1973 in Rome)
- 22 May – Wilhelmina Hay Abbott, suffragist and feminist (died 1957 in England)
- 28 August – Peter Fraser, Labour prime minister of New Zealand (1940–1949) (died 1950 in New Zealand)

== Deaths ==
- 26 February – Alexander Wood, physician, inventor of the first true hypodermic syringe (born 1817)
- 30 November – Sir Alexander Grant, 10th Baronet, Principal of the University of Edinburgh (born 1826 in the United States)
- 20 December – William Lindsay Alexander, church leader (born 1808)
- Anthony Inglis, shipbuilder (born 1813)

== The arts ==
- Publication of Songs of the North by Harold Boulton and Anne MacLeod including the first known version of "The Skye Boat Song".

== See also ==
- Timeline of Scottish history
- 1884 in Ireland
