= Helen Acquroff =

Scottish musician (1831–1887)

- Born: 12 October 1831; Edinburgh, Scotland
- Died: 18 September 1887 (aged 55); Edinburgh, Scotland
- Other name: Sister Cathedral
- Movement: Temperance

Helen Acquroff (12 October 1831 – 18 September 1887) was a musician, pianist, music teacher, singer and poet who was born and lived in the Newington area of Edinburgh. She was blind from the age of 11 and grew to be active in the Temperance Movement.

== Biography ==
Helen's parents were John Acquroff (born 1795) a Russian hairdresser, and Sophia Campbell Fletcher (born 22 May 1808) from Ardelach, Nairn. They had ten children of which Helen was the second eldest. She had poor sight from birth and was totally blind by the age of 11. She attended the Blind Asylum School (later the Royal Blind Asylum and School), and later taught there. Her son James was born in 1862 and she remained unmarried throughout her life. Helen died of Nephritis at 51 Clerk Street, Edinburgh, aged 55.

== Temperance movement ==
Helen was an active supporter of the Temperance Movement, singing and speaking in concert halls and theatres in Edinburgh and across Scotland. She was noted for her sense of humour, often opening Temperance meetings with light-hearted, amusing songs. She adopted the name Sister Cathedral (initially Sister Helen Acquroff) after an address for Glasgow Cathedral was published, warning people of Glasgow of the perils of intemperance.

== Poetry ==
She wrote many hundreds of songs, hymns, temperance music and poems, of which much has been lost. Some works appear in her collection Good Templar Songs, published in 1872. They include Polly Hopkins, Sabbath School Song, The Swiss Girl, When We Were Bairns Thegither, The Reformed Drunkard To His Wife. Her works are also included in the anthologies Working-Class Women Poets in Victorian Britain: An Anthology, and in One hundred modern Scottish poets: with biographical and critical notices.

When We Were Bairns Thegither

It's forty years, my ain gudeman.
Since I was made your wife;
An' nane in a' this warld can say
But(?) we've led a happy life.
But ah, waes me, it's sixty year
Since we kent ane anither
For hand in hand we gaed to schule
When we were bairns ....

== Memorial ==
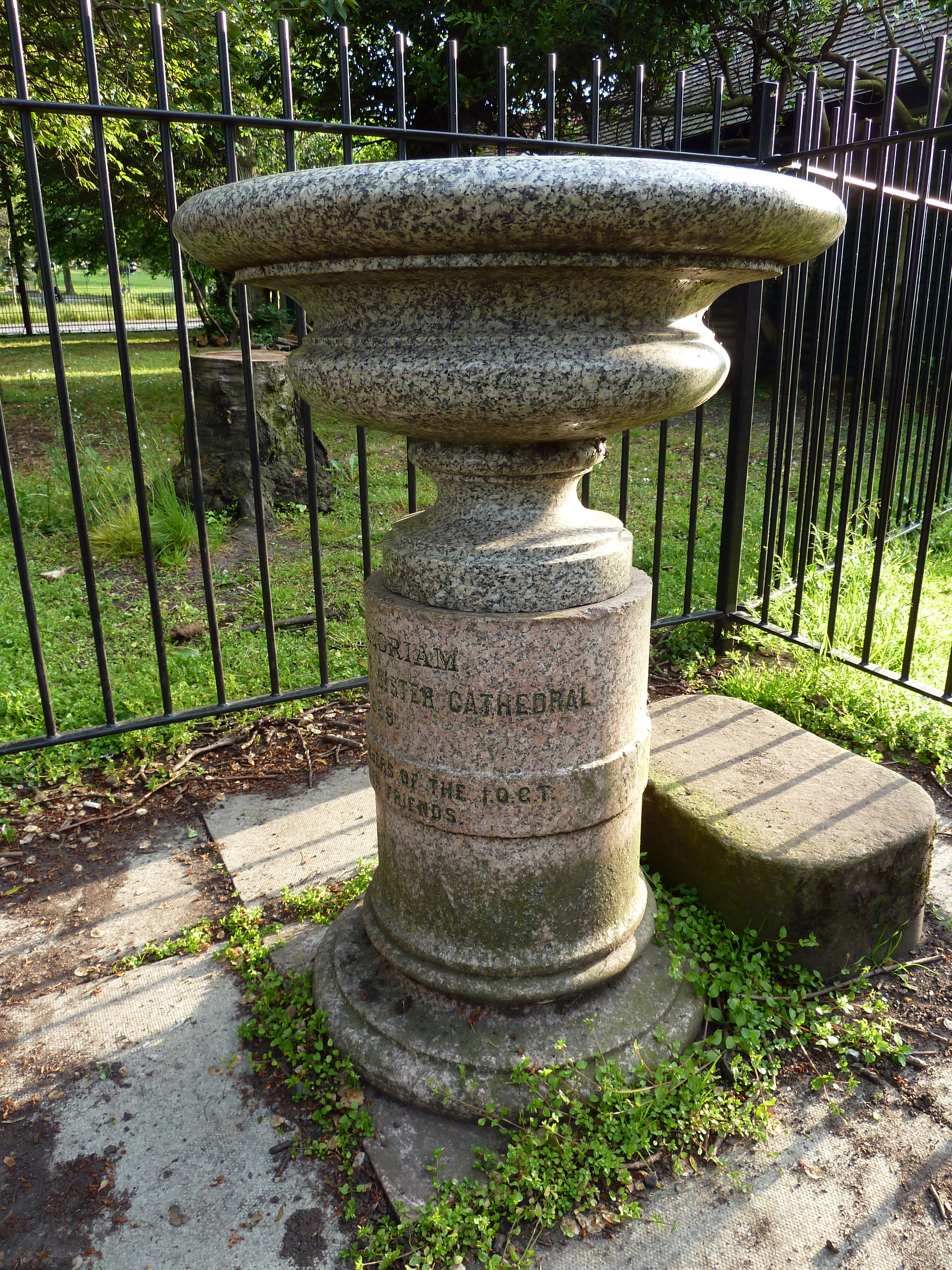
Memorial Drinking Fountain to Helen Acquroff at the Meadows, Edinburgh

There is a marble memorial drinking fountain to Helen in the Meadows, near the junction of Jawbone and Coronation Walks on the west side of the path, inside railings, near the pavilion, Melville Drive, Edinburgh. The inscription reads:

IN MEMORIUM
HELEN ACQUROFF SISTER CATHEDRAL
1889
ERECTED BY MEMBERS OF THE IOCT
AND OTHER FRIENDS

The IOGT were the Independent Order of Good Templars. It appears as a C on the memorial, not a G.
