= Wilson McEwan =

Australian cricketer

Personal information
- Full name: Joseph Wilson McEwan
- Born: 16 April 1830; Bonhill, Dunbarton, Scotland
- Died: 26 February 1885 (aged 54); Tunbridge, Tasmania, Australia

Domestic team information
- Years: Team
- 1852: Tasmania
- Only First-class: 29 March 1852 Tasmania v Victoria

Career statistics
Competition	First-class
Matches	1
Runs scored	10
Batting average	–
100s/50s	–/–
Top score	10*
Catches/stumpings	–/–
- Source: CricketArchive, 2 January 2011

Joseph Wilson McEwan (16 April 1830 – 26 February 1885), was an Australian cricket player, who played one first-class cricket match for Tasmania on 29 and 30 March 1852. He made 10 not out.
