= Dot Allan =

Scottish writer (1886–1964)

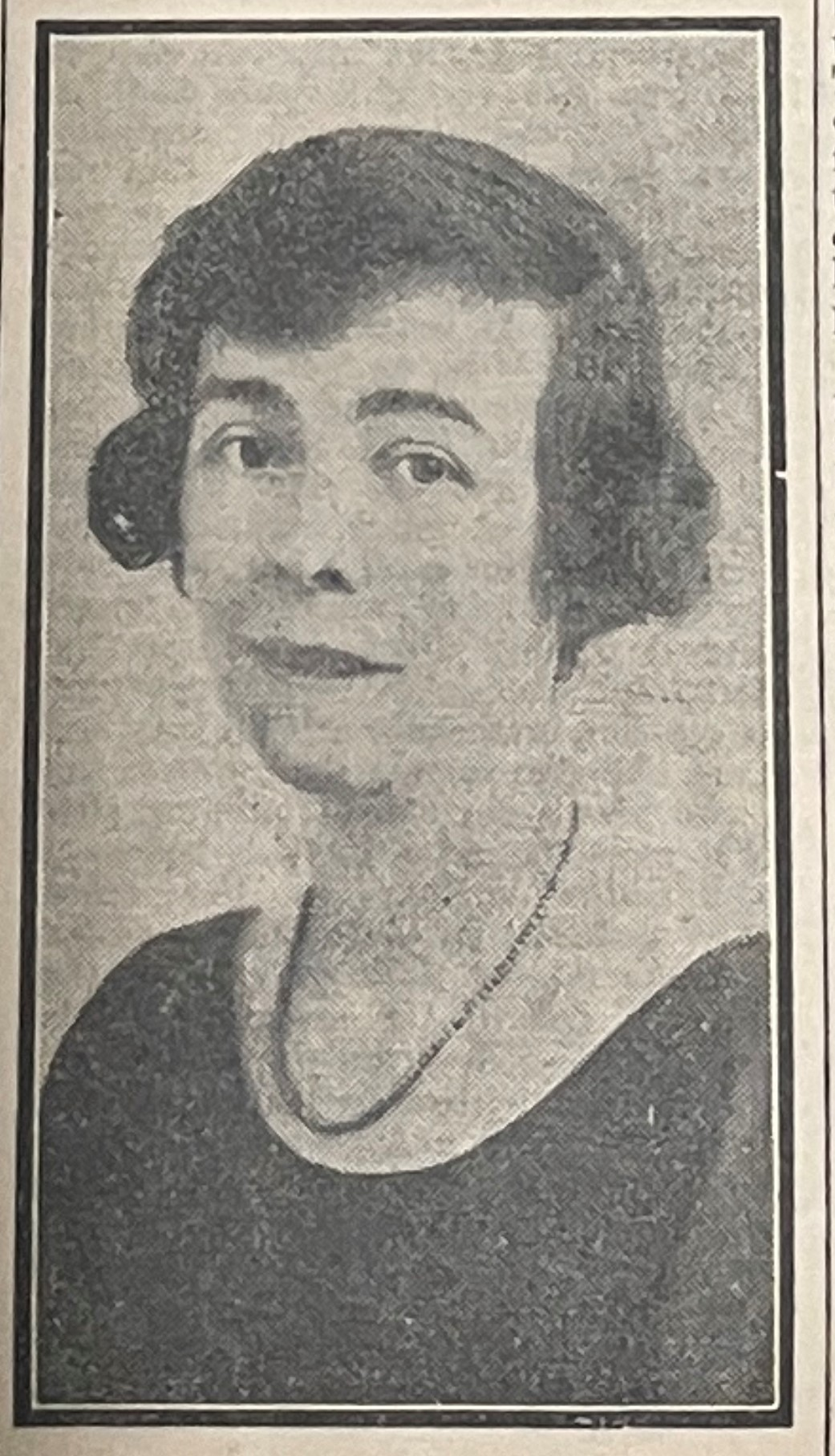
- Born: Eliza MacNaughton Luke Allan; 13 May 1886; Denny, Falkirk, Stirlingshire, Scotland
- Died: 3 December 1964 (aged 78); Glasgow, Scotland
- Education: University of Glasgow
- Occupations: novelist, playwright, journalist
- Writing career
- Genres: gender and class issues
- Notable works: Makeshift (1928); Hunger March (1934)

Dot Allan, born Eliza MacNaughton Luke Allan, (13 May 1886 – 3 December 1964) was a Scottish novelist and freelance writer. Much of her work focused on class and gender issues in Glasgow society during the early 20th century.

== Biography ==
Allan was born in Denny, the only child of Jean Luke and Alexander Allan, an iron merchant. Her parents were affluent and middle-class, and she was privately educated before attending classes at the University of Glasgow. After her father's death, and while she was still a young woman, Allan and her widowed mother moved to the west end of Glasgow.

She was described as a petite woman with a soft voice and a retiring disposition who hosted elegant afternoon teas.

Allan enjoyed attending the theatre and began her writing career as a playwright. She later became a prolific freelance writer and journalist who had articles and short stories published regularly in a range of newspapers and periodicals. Despite finding both popular and critical success during the 1920s and 1930s, Allan abandoned her writing during both world wars to focus on nursing and charity work. After the World War II she returned to writing however her later works are regarded as less notable.

Allan was a member of the Scottish PEN and she used the organisation to distribute some of her inheritance to financially support the work of other writers.

She interviewed Sarah Bernhardt when she visited Glasgow.

Allan died of breast cancer in Glasgow in 1964.

== Notable works ==
Allan published ten novels in total, including:

- The Syrens (1921)
- Makeshift (1928)
- Deepening River (1932)
- Hunger March (1934)
- John Mathew, Papermaker (1948)
- Charity Begins at Home (1958)
