= 1967 in Scotland =

- Centuries: 18th; 19th; 20th; 21st
- Decades: 1940s; 1950s; 1960s; 1970s; 1980s
- See also: List of years in Scotland; Timeline of Scottish history 1967 in: The UK • Wales • Elsewhere; Scottish football: 1966–67 • 1967–68; 1967 in Scottish television

Events from the year 1967 in Scotland.

== Incumbents ==
- Secretary of State for Scotland and Keeper of the Great Seal – Willie Ross

=== Law officers ===
- Lord Advocate – Gordon Stott; then Henry Wilson
- Solicitor General for Scotland – Henry Wilson; then Ewan Stewart

=== Judiciary ===
- Lord President of the Court of Session and Lord Justice General – Lord Clyde
- Lord Justice Clerk – Lord Grant
- Chairman of the Scottish Land Court – Lord Birsay

== Events ==
- 7 February – Mortonhall Crematorium, Edinburgh, designed by Spence, Glover & Ferguson (project architect: John 'Archie' Dewar), is dedicated.
- 9 March – Glasgow Pollok by-election: Conservatives take the seat from Labour despite a fall in support as the Scottish National Party gains 28% of the vote. This will be the last time the Conservatives capture a seat at a Scottish by-election until 2026.
- 26 March – closure of Machrihanish Coalfield.
- April–June – the Scottish Region of British Railways withdraws its last steam locomotives.
- 28 April – Third Lanark A.C. plays its last football match.
- 25 May – Celtic F.C. become the first British and Northern European team to reach a European Cup final and also to win it, beating Inter Milan 2-1 in normal time with the winning goal being scored by Steve Chalmers in Lisbon, Portugal.
- 27 May – closure of the last route served by trolleybuses in Glasgow.
- 1 August – Queen's College, Dundee, become the University of Dundee, wholly independent of the University of St Andrews.
- 9 September – an underground fire at Michael Colliery in East Wemyss in the Fife Coalfield kills 9; more than 300 escape but the mine is closed.
- 20 September – the Queen Elizabeth 2, the largest ship ever built in Scotland and the last passenger ship built on the Clyde, is launched at John Brown & Company's yard at Clydebank.
- 2 November – Hamilton by-election: Winnie Ewing wins for the Scottish National Party, taking the seat from Labour.
- 13 November – University of Stirling chartered.
- 20 December – Scott Lithgow formed to merge the Clyde shipbuilding interests of Scotts Shipbuilding and Engineering Company and Lithgows.
- Deepwater pier on Coll opened.
- Workers Party of Scotland (Marxist–Leninist) formed.
- Scottish Civic Trust formed to promote protection and enhancement of the built environment.
- Kagyu Samye Ling Monastery and Tibetan Centre established in Eskdalemuir.

== Births ==
- January – King Creosote (Kenny Anderson), singer-songwriter
- 21 February – Neil Oliver, archaeologist and television presenter
- 11 March – John Barrowman, actor
- 8 June – Kathryn Imrie, golfer
- 15 August – Tony Hand, ice hockey player
- 23 August – Jim Murphy, Labour politician
- 26 August – Michael Gove, Conservative politician
- 26 October – Douglas Alexander, Labour politician
- 29 December – Carl Honoré, writer on current affairs
- Martin Boyce, sculptor
- Graeme Macrae Burnet, novelist
- Nathan Coley, installation artist

== Deaths ==
- 3 January – Mary Garden, operatic soprano (born 1874)
- 23 March – Duncan Macrae, actor (born 1905)
- 3 August – Thomas Haining Gillespie, founder of the Royal Zoological Society of Scotland and Edinburgh Zoo (born 1876)
- 13 August – Dòmhnall Ruadh Chorùna, poet (born 1887)
- 6 September – Alex Moffat, miner, trade unionist and communist activist (born 1904)
- Annie Maxton, Independent Labour politician

== The Arts ==
- George Mackay Brown's first book of stories, A Calendar of Love, published

== See also ==
- 1967 in Northern Ireland
