= Hackness Martello Tower and Battery =

Fortification in Orkney, Scotland

- Orkney
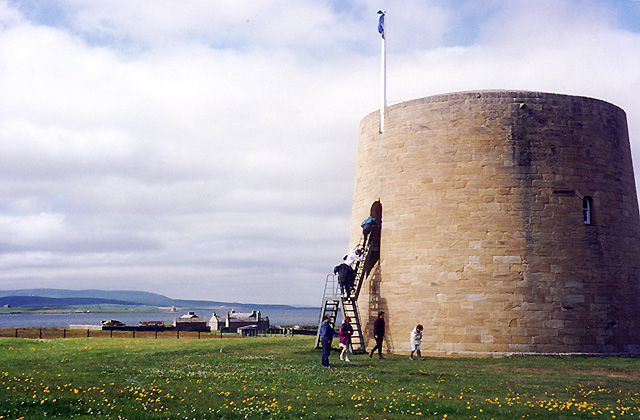
- Hackness Martello Tower

Site information
- Type: Barracks
- Owner: Ministry of Defence
- Operator: British Army

Location
- Coordinates: 58.8039°N 3.1468°W

Site history
- Built: 1815
- Built for: War Office
- In use: 1815-1918

Scheduled monument
- Official name: Hackness, Battery and Martello Tower
- Type: 20th Century Military and Related: Battery, Secular: battery; martello tower
- Designated: 29 October 1969
- Reference no.: SM90211

Hackness Martello Tower and Battery is a former British Army barracks and currently a museum located on the island of South Walls, in Orkney, Scotland.

== History ==
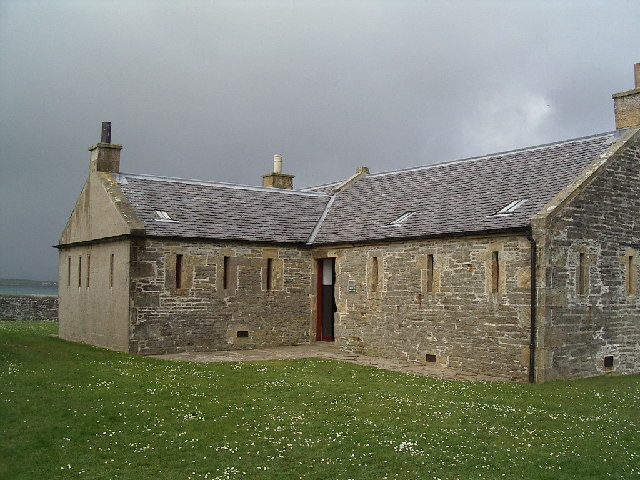
Barracks

The Martello tower, together with another on the north side at Crockness, was built in 1815 to protect British ships in the bay of Longhope against attack by American and French privateers, during the Napoleonic Wars, while they waited for a Royal Navy escort on their journey to Baltic ports.

The towers were upgraded, with the installation of new guns and other structures, in 1866 at a time of concern about the possibility of another French invasion.

== See also ==
- Tally Toor, Leith
