= Robert Freeman (pastor) =

Scottish-American clergyman

Robert Freeman (born 1878, Edinburgh, Scotland) was a Scottish-American clergyman.

After engaging in mission work in Pennsylvania and New York for four years, he was ordained in the Baptist ministry in 1900; thereafter he held various pastorates until 1910. He was moderator of the Synod of California in 1920–21.

During the War he directed the first expeditionary division of the YMCA and in 1917-18 was director of religious work in France.

Other offices which he filled are director of the San Francisco Theological Seminary and trustee of Occidental College.

He is the author of The Hour of Prayer (1914) and The Land I Live In (1921).
