= Dunans Bridge =

Bridge in Argyll and Bute, Scotland

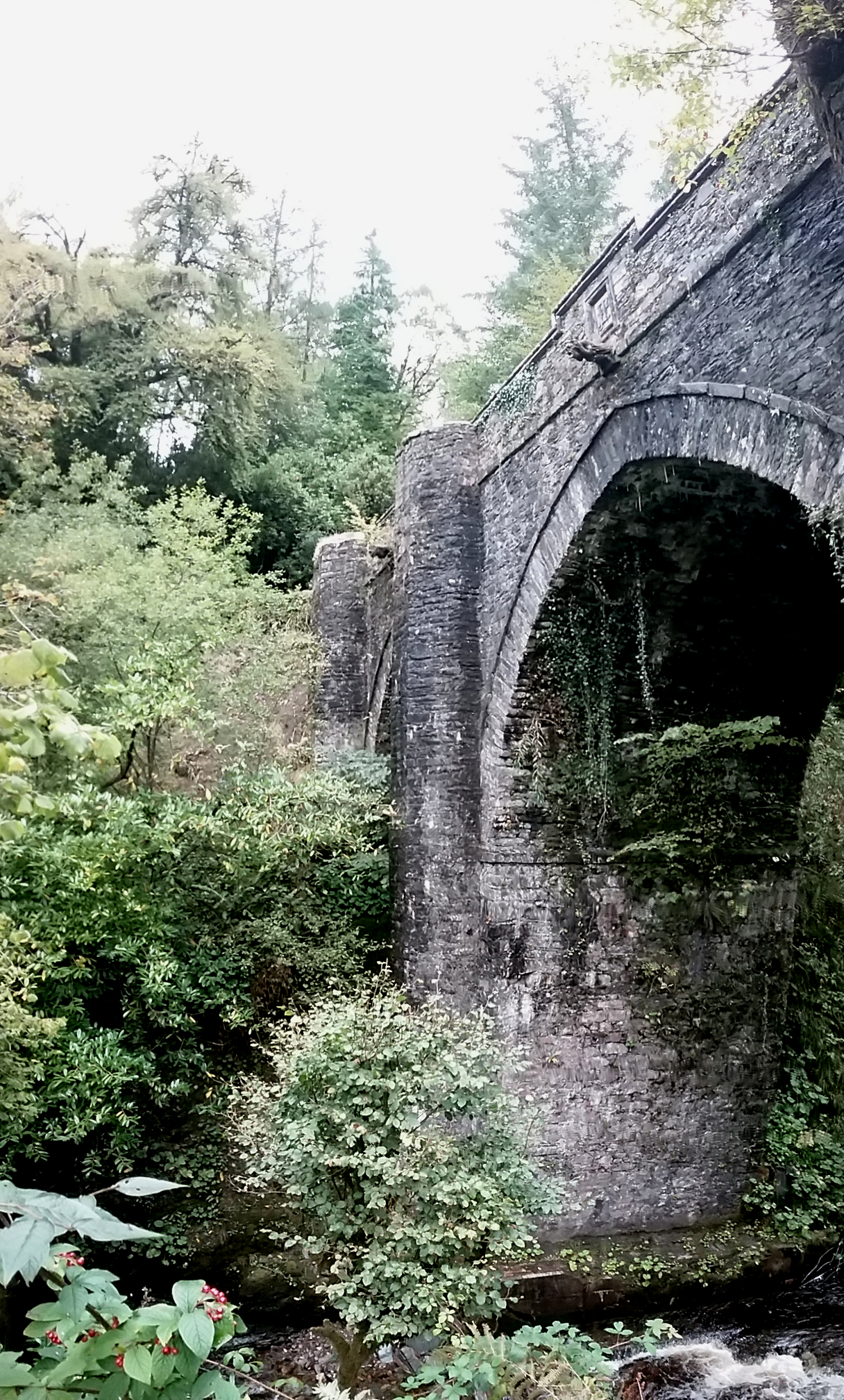
- Center arch, from downstream
- Coordinates: 56.07384°N 5.14997°W
- OS grid reference: NS 04048 91254
- Locale: Argyll and Bute

Characteristics
- Design: Arch
- Material: Stone
- Height: 15 metres (49 ft)
- No. of spans: 3

History
- Designer: Thomas Telford
- Built: 1815
- Replaces: Swing bridge

Listed Building – Category A
- Official name: Dunans Bridge Alte a'Chaol Ghlinn
- Designated: 19 July 1971
- Reference no.: LB11806

Location
- Interactive map of Dunans Bridge

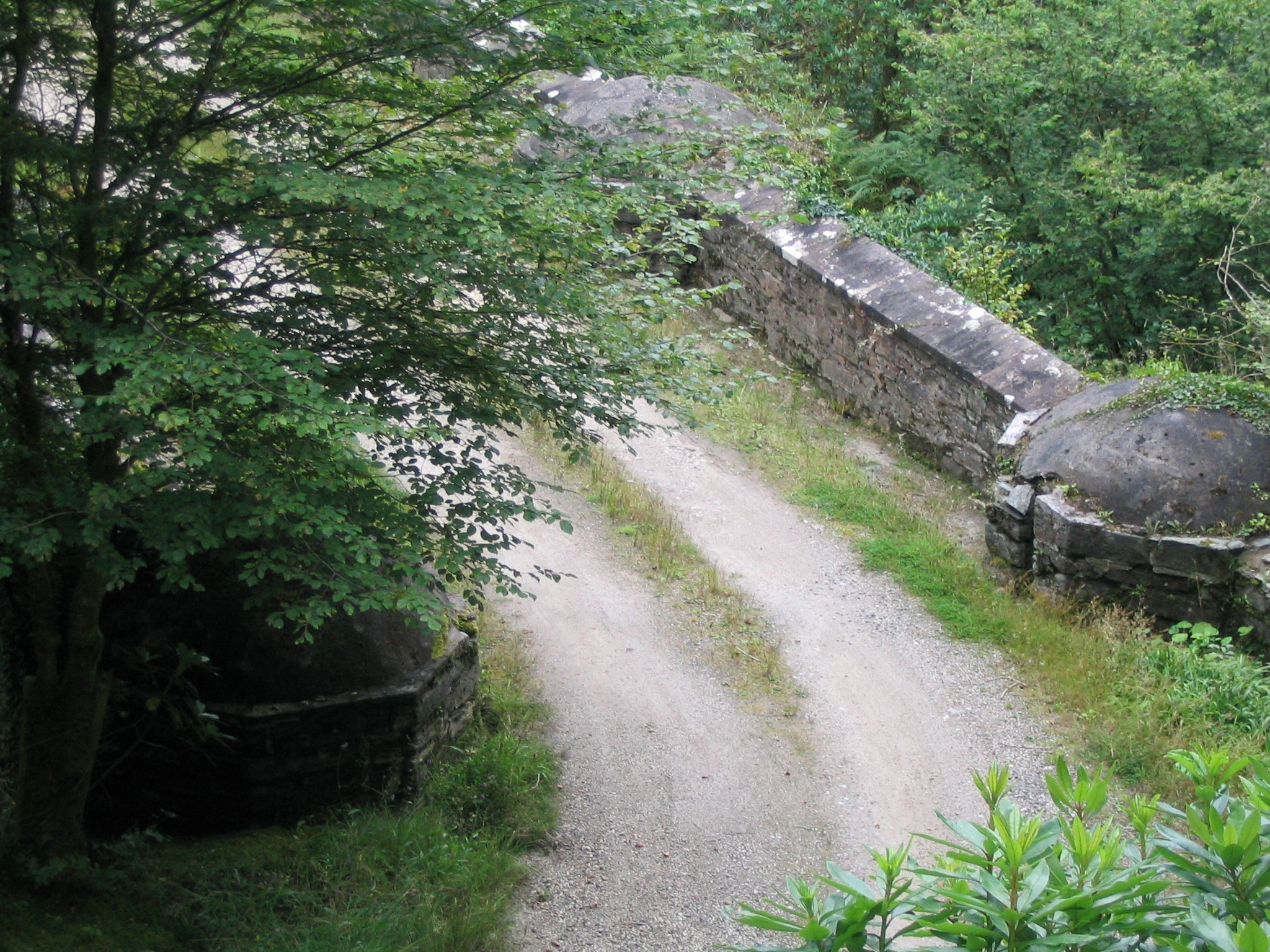
Dunans Bridge

Dunans Bridge is a category A-listed structure, designed by Thomas Telford. It is located at Dunans Castle on the Cowal peninsula in Argyll, Scotland. It was built for John Fletcher of Dunans, to commemorate the battle of Waterloo. The bridge was completed in 1815, and predates the 1864 elaboration of Dunans House by Kerr into a Franco-Baronial "castle". The three-arched rubble construction is considered internationally important as it is the only extant bridge of this type. It stands over 15 metres (49 ft) from the river bed and has been voted one of Scotland's ten best bridges. It was built to replace the now destroyed "swing bridge". Though it is of a kind often constructed by Telford, the three arches, gargoyles and eight hexagonal piers, as well as its sheer height 16 metres (52 ft), make it unique.

The structure is in the "RESTORATION IN PROGRESS" category on the Buildings at Risk Register for Scotland. The 2023 update indicates: "North face was repointed last year, repairs to the eastern arch commence late 2023. Further works into 2024-5 are scheduled, including the repointing of the main arch."

== See also ==
- List of bridges in Scotland
