= John Kennedy (theologian) =

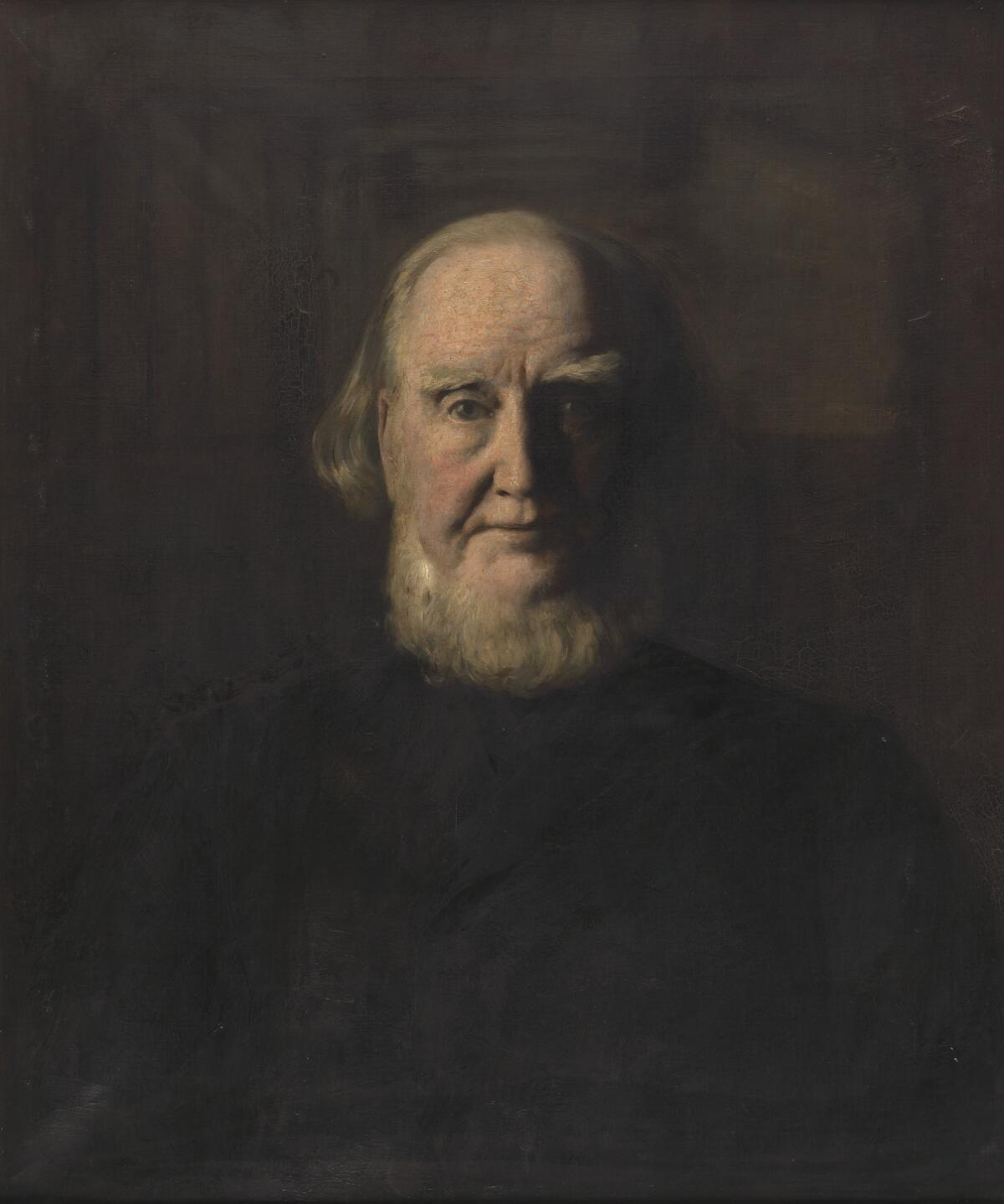
John Kennedy about 1880

John Kennedy (1813–6 February 1900) was a Scottish Congregational minister and author.

== Life ==
Born at Aberfeldy, Perthshire, where his father was a minister, and educated at Aberdeen, Edinburgh, and Glasgow universities. Kennedy was pastor of a Congregational church in Aberdeen from 1836 to 1846. He was then called to the Stepney Congregational Meeting House in London, a charge he held until his retirement in 1882. During his time, a large Gothic church was erected in place of the old meeting house.

In 1872 he was chairman of the Congregational Union of England and Wales, and received the degree Doctor of Divinity (DD) from both universities in Aberdeen, Edinburgh. From 1872 to 1876 Kennedy was professor of apologetics at New College, London, and from 1884 to 1895 chairman of the New College council. He took an active part in many charities, including the Hospital Sunday Fund, and the East London Children's Hospital. In 1851 he called public attention to the famine-stricken state of Skye and raised a fund which, according to press reports, saved many from death by starvation. Fifteen years later he was involved in relieving distress caused by cholera in East London.

Kennedy died at Hampstead on 6 February 1900.

== Family ==
Kennedy married, in 1846, a sister of Professor John Stuart Blackie. They had five sons and two daughters, including Sir Alexander Kennedy, and a daughter who married Professor Olaus Henrici.

== Works ==
- The Divine Life (1858)
- The Resurrection of Jesus Christ, An Historical Fact; with an Examination of Naturalistic Hypotheses (1871)
- A Brief Defence of Supernatural Christianity (1875)
- The Gospels: Their Age and Authorship (1880)
- A Popular Handbook of Christian Evidences (1880)
- The Pentateuch: Its Age and Authorship (1884)
- Old Testament Criticism and the Rights of Non-Experts (1897)

Kennedy was also the editor of The Christian Witness (1866–73) and The Evangelical Magazine (1887–90).
