= John Hosack =

Scottish lawyer and historical writer

John Hosack (baptised 1813 – 1887) was a Scottish lawyer and historical writer.

== Life ==
He was the third son of John R. Hosack of Glenaher, Dumfriesshire. He became a student of the Middle Temple in 1838, was called to the bar in 1841, and practised on the northern circuit and at the Liverpool sessions.

In 1875, though not a Q.C., Hosack was made a bencher of his inn, and in 1877 he became police magistrate at Clerkenwell. He died at his house in Finborough Road, West Brompton, on 3 November 1887, and was buried at Lytham in Lancashire.

== Works ==
Hosack works include:

- A Treatise on the Conflict of Laws of England and Scotland (only one part published), London, 1847.
- The Rights of British and Neutral Commerce, as affected by recent Royal Declarations and Orders in Council, London, 1854.
- Mary Queen of Scots and her Accusers, London, 1869; 2nd edit., 2 vols., Edinburgh, 1870–4; a defence of Mary, Queen of Scots.
- On the Rise and Growth of the Law of Nations, … from the earliest times to the Treaty of Utrecht, London, 1882.
- Mary Stewart: a brief statement of the principal charges which have been brought against her, together with answers to the same, published after his death, Edinburgh, 1888.

Hosack's historical works strongly reflect the prejudice and humour of his day. In discussing Mary, Queen of Scots, and the "Book of Articles", he wrote "golf is not, and we believe never was, a lady's game in Scotland".

== Notes ==
Attribution

This article incorporates text from a publication now in the public domain: Lee, Sidney, ed. (1891). "Hosack, John". Dictionary of National Biography. Vol. 27. London: Smith, Elder & Co.
