= Tron riot =

Riot in Old Town of Edinburgh, Scotland

The Tron Riot occurred in Edinburgh, Scotland in 1811–12. It took place in the city's Old Town, in the vicinity of the Tron Kirk. On the night of New Year's Eve and during the early hours of the next day, a group of young men, including the Keellie Gang, attacked and robbed wealthier passers-by. One police officer was killed in the riot. Sixty-eight youths were arrested, and five were sentenced to death.

== Background and events ==
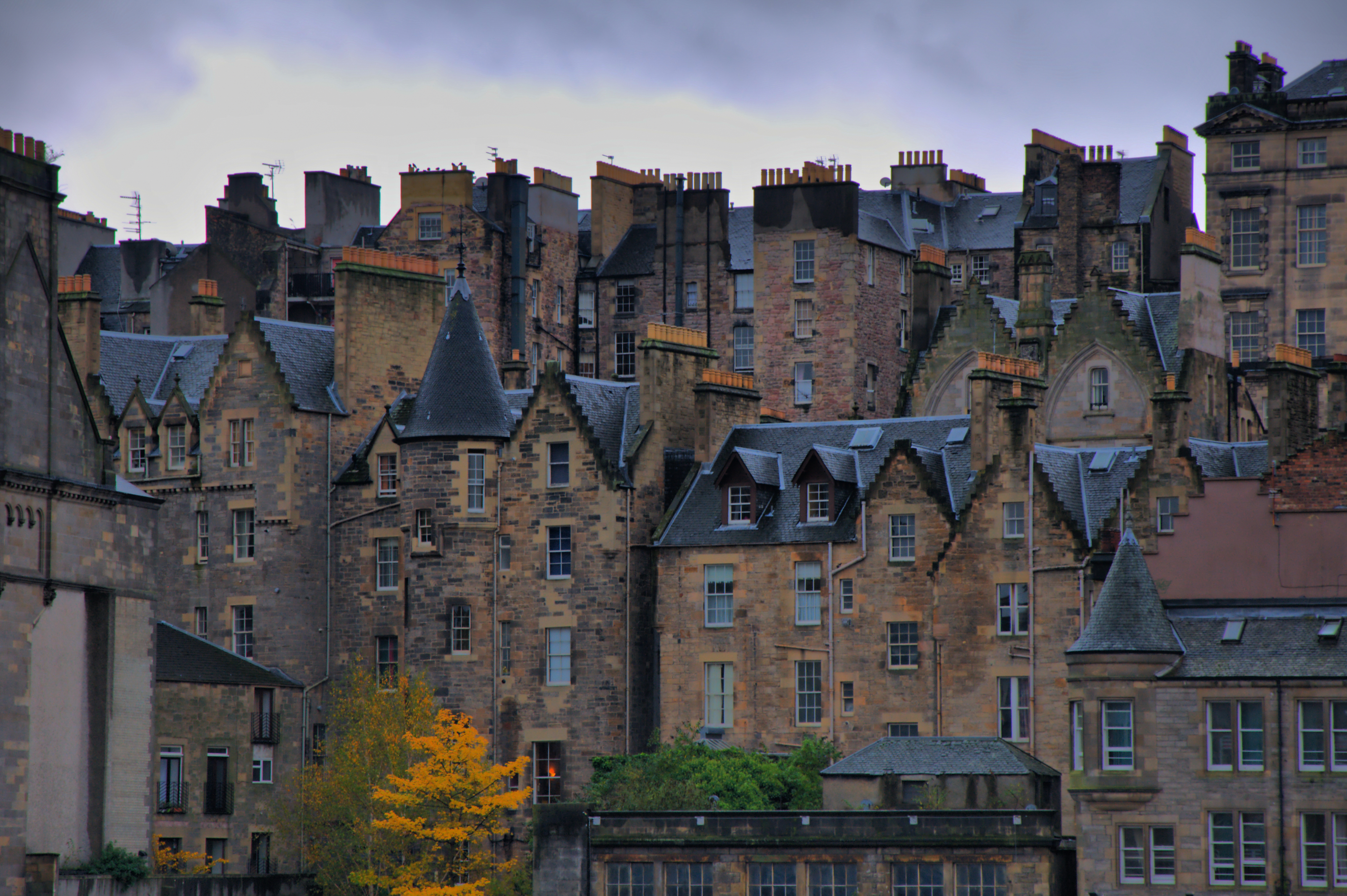
The crowded tenements of Edinburgh's Old Town

The early nineteenth century in Edinburgh was a time of tension between residents of the city's crowded Old Town, and the wealthier inhabitants of New Town, which had been created from 1767. Class divisions had become more apparent with this architectural separation. Furthermore, conflicts, riots and social disorder were common throughout Scotland at that time. The Old Town was inhabited by a number of gangs of young men, one group was the Keellie Gang (also known as the Niddry Gang), led by Hugh MacDonald and Hugh McIntosh. Police officers had been given more powers, and this was resented, especially by the poor. The petty crimes perpetrated by gangs like the Keellies were increasingly being quashed by authorities.

It was the tradition for New Town residents to come to the Old Town to celebrate Hogmanay in the streets around the Tron Kirk, which was the parish church at the time. After midnight, crowds would move around the area, travelling to friends' homes as part of the custom of First-Footing. According to later trial testimony, the Keellie Gang had been planning during the last weeks of 1811 to take advantage of the rich New Town Hogmanay crowds, and to attack the police at the same time.

On 31 December, the Keellie Gang members began attacking passers-by in the streets of the Old Town, from around 11.00 pm. Victims were surrounded by youths with wooden sticks, threatened, in some cases knocked to the ground, and robbed. A member of the town watch [policeman] named Dugald Campbell was attacked by a group of the youths in Stamp Office Close, off the High Street. He was beaten with sticks and left to die. Evidently Campbell was known to the gang, and disliked by them; it was later claimed that they had planned to "give him a licking the last night of the year if they could get him."

== Aftermath ==
Campbell was taken to the Royal Infirmary, and died from his injuries on 3 January. Monetary rewards of 300 guineas were offered by the Town Council for information leading to the arrest of his attackers. Victims and witnesses described many of the rioters as "boys" and "young lads". By the end of the month, 68 youths had been arrested, none of whom were over the age of 20. They were described as "a band of idle apprentices". Key perpetrators were seen to be John Skelton, Hugh McIntosh (16), Hugh MacDonald (18) and Neil Sutherland (18). Skelton was convicted of attempted robbery, while McIntosh, MacDonald and Sutherland were convicted of having planned the riot, and having made attacks; McIntosh was further convicted of the murder of Dugald Campbell. All four were sentenced to death along with James Johnstone, who was never apprehended. Skelton's sentence was later commuted to transportation for life on account of his previous good character. On 22 April, McIntosh, Sutherland and MacDonald were hanged in Stamp Office Close. McIntosh's body was sent for anatomical dissection, while Sutherland and MacDonald were buried in Greyfriars Kirkyard.

According to historian Andrew Ralston, the Tron riot case was used to send a strong message about juvenile delinquency, and to deter other would-be offenders. In addition to the three who were sentenced to death, some of the more minor offenders of the riot received relatively harsh sentences for their crimes. Lord Gillies hoped that these punishments "would not be lost on the youth of this city, but be the means of making them abhor such conduct as had been recently perpetrated here."

Following the riot, the authorities quickly took steps to reorganise and strengthen the police force. Later that year, the Edinburgh Police Act 1812 (52 Geo. 3. c. clxxii) was introduced, which significantly increased the number of police officers patrolling the city.
