= 1889 in the United Kingdom =

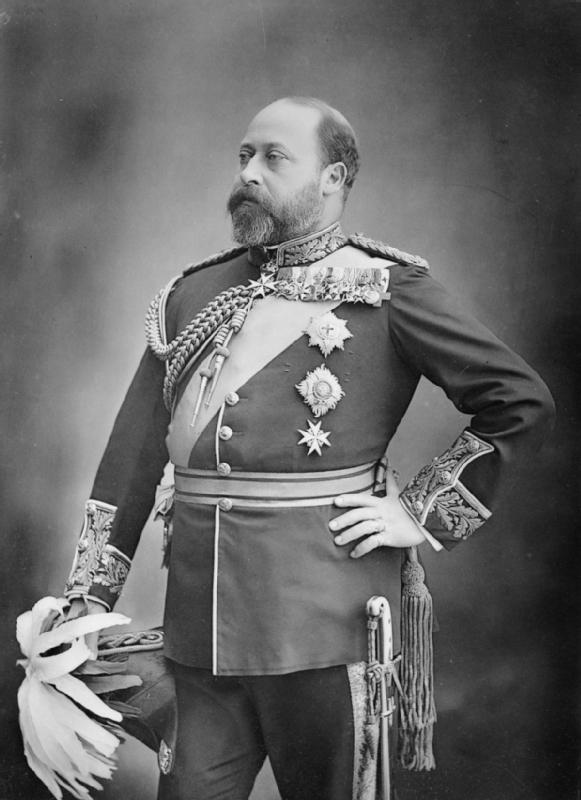
Portrait of the Prince of Wales, later King Edward VII, wearing full dress uniform in 1889.

Events from the year 1889 in the United Kingdom.

== Incumbents ==
- Monarch – Victoria
- Prime Minister – Robert Gascoyne-Cecil, 3rd Marquess of Salisbury (Conservative)

== Events ==
- 14 January – Birmingham is granted city status in the United Kingdom, despite not (at this time) having an Anglican cathedral, which has previously been a requirement for the honour in England.
- 26 January – Dundee is granted city status in the United Kingdom by letters patent.
- 5 February – The first issue of Glasgow University Magazine is published in Scotland.
- 12 February – The London County Council elects Lord Rosebery as its first Chairman.
- 17 February – Royal Society for the Protection of Birds founded in Manchester, originally known as "The Plumage League" to campaign against the use of plumage in women's clothing.
- 25 February – The landmark court decision in the case of The Moorcock establishes the concept of implied terms in English contract law.
- 30 March – Preston North End win the FA Cup final with a 3–0 win over Wolverhampton Wanderers at Kennington Oval, London. Having on 5 January sealed the first Football League title with no defeats all season, they complete the double.
- 1 April – New elected county councils in England and Wales (including the London County Council) created by the Local Government Act 1888, take up their powers.
- 31 May – The Naval Defence Act dictates that the fleet strength of the Royal Navy must be equal to that of at least any two other countries.
- 12 June – Armagh rail disaster: runaway carriages from a Sunday school excursion collide with an oncoming train near Armagh in the north of Ireland, killing 80, leading to rapid passage of the Regulation of Railways Act 1889 on railway signalling and brakes in the UK.
- 6 July – Several aristocrats are implicated in the Cleveland Street scandal after police raid a male brothel in London.
- 15 July – The Scottish National Portrait Gallery opens in Edinburgh in premises designed by Rowand Anderson, the first in the world to be purpose-built as a portrait gallery.
- 31 July – Louise, Princess Royal, marries Alexander Duff, 1st Duke of Fife.
- 3 August
  - Mahdist War: Egyptian and British victory at the Battle of Toski.
  - Opening of Hawarden Bridge, Wales.
- 6 August – The Savoy Hotel in London opens.
- 14 August–15 September – London dockers strike for a minimum wage of sixpence an hour ("The dockers' tanner"), which they eventually receive, a landmark in the development of New Unionism.
- 26 August
  - Prevention of Cruelty to, and Protection of, Children Act ("Children's Charter") for the first time imposes criminal penalties to deter child abuse.
  - Local Government (Scotland) Act establishes county councils in Scotland effective from 1890.
  - Official Secrets Act for the first time imposes criminal penalties to deter officials from disclosing confidential information.
- 30 August
  - Technical Instruction Act empowers county and county borough councils to make grants to secondary schools and provide scholarships.
  - Official opening of Royal Mail Mount Pleasant Sorting Office in London.
- 2 September – Wolverhampton Wanderers F.C. move into their new Molineux stadium in the grounds of Wolverhampton's Molineux Hotel.
- 7 September
  - Sheffield United F.C. play their first match, having been formed on 22 March at the Adelphi Hotel, Sheffield.
  - Morley Memorial College for Working Men and Women opens in South London.
- 10 September – Last (possible) female victim of the Thames Torso Murders found.
- 29 October – British South Africa Company receives a Royal Charter.
- October/November – Shah Jahan Mosque, Woking, opened for worship, founded by Gottlieb Wilhelm Leitner as the first purpose-built mosque in Britain.
- 2 November – Wimbledon F.C. (as "Wimbledon Old Central Football Club") play their first match.

=== Undated ===
- Trowbridge supersedes Wilton as the county town of Wiltshire.
- Arthur Wharton signs for Rotherham Town F.C. for the 1889/90 season, becoming probably the world's first black professional football player.
- The little owl first breeds in England.

== Publications ==
- Charles Booth's social survey Life and Labour of the People in London begins publication.
- Lewis Carroll's children's novel Sylvie and Bruno.
- T. H. Huxley's book Agnosticism.
- Jerome K. Jerome's comic travelogue Three Men in a Boat.
- Andrew Lang's The Blue Fairy Book.
- Robert Louis Stevenson's historical novel The Master of Ballantrae.
- Encyclopædia Britannica, 9th edition, completed in 24 main volumes.
- Wisden Cricketers' Almanack publishes its first Wisden Cricketers of the Year (actually titled Six Great Bowlers of the Year). The cricketers chosen are George Lohmann, Bobby Peel, Johnny Briggs, Charles Turner, J. J. Ferris and Sammy Woods.

== Births ==
- 9 January – Eileen Power, medieval economic historian (died 1940)
- 17 January – Ralph H. Fowler, astronomer and physicist (died 1944)
- 21 January – Edith Bratt, wife of J. R. R. Tolkien (died 1971)
- 31 January – Frank Foster, cricketer (died 1958)
- 5 February – Ernest Tyldesley, cricketer (died 1962)
- 19 February – Ernest Marsden, physicist (died 1970)
- 22 February
  - Olave Baden-Powell, founder of the Girl Guides (died 1977)
  - R. G. Collingwood, philosopher and historian (died 1943)
- 21 March – Bernard Freyberg, army officer, VC recipient and colonial governor (died 1963)
- 24 March – Albert Hill, athlete (died 1969)
- 8 April – Adrian Boult, conductor (died 1983)
- 14 April – Arnold J. Toynbee, historian (died 1975)
- 16 April – Charlie Chaplin, comic actor and film director (died 1977)
- 20 April – Harold Bache, cricketer (died 1916)
- 24 April – Stafford Cripps, politician (died 1952)
- 11 May – Paul Nash, painter (died 1946)
- 21 May – Bernard Rawlings, admiral (died 1962)
- 27 May – Hugh Franklin, activist for women's suffrage (died 1962)
- 31 May
  - Charles Gordon Bell, pilot (died 1918)
  - Athene Seyler, actress (died 1990)
- 1 June – Charles Kay Ogden, linguist, philosopher and writer (died 1957)
- 22 June – Joseph Cohen, solicitor, property developer, cinema magnate and Jewish community leader (died 1980)
- 23 June – Verena Holmes, mechanical engineer and inventor (died 1964)
- 22 July – James Whale, horror film director (died 1957 in Hollywood)
- 21 August – Richard O'Connor, General in World War II (died 1981)
- 25 September
  - G. D. H. Cole, political and economic theorist, historian and detective fiction writer (died 1959)
  - C. K. Scott-Moncrieff, writer and translator (died 1930)
- 27 October – Enid Bagnold, author and playwright (died 1981)
- 30 November – Edgar Douglas Adrian, 1st Baron Adrian, physiologist, Nobel Prize laureate (died 1977)

== Deaths ==
- 5 February – James Smetham, painter (born 1821)
- 11 March – Samuel Carter Hall, journalist (born 1800)
- 26 March
  - Richard Plantagenet Temple-Nugent-Brydges-Chandos-Grenville, 3rd Duke of Buckingham and Chandos, soldier, politician and colonial administrator (born 1823)
  - Elizabeth Ayton Godwin, hymn writer and religious poet (born 1817)
- 6 April
  - Princess Augusta of Hesse-Kassel (Duchess of Cambridge), member of the royal family (born 1797)
  - Benjamin Hall Kennedy, Latin scholar and promoter of women's higher education (born 1804)
- 8 June – Gerard Manley Hopkins, poet (born 1844)
- 10 September – Amy Levy, feminist poet and novelist, suicide (born 1861)
- 23 September
  - Wilkie Collins, novelist (born 1824)
  - Eliza Cook, Chartist poet (born 1818)
- 11 October – James Prescott Joule, physicist (born 1818)
- 18 November – William Allingham, poet and diarist (born 1824)
- 29 November – Martin Farquhar Tupper, writer and poet (born 1810)
- 12 December
  - Edward Bradley ('Cuthbert Bede'), writer (born 1827)
  - Robert Browning, poet (born 1812)
- 23 December – Constance Naden, poet and philosopher (born 1858)
- 30 December – Sir Henry Yule, Scottish orientalist (born 1820)

== See also ==
- List of British films before 1920
