= Crockness Martello tower =

Coordinates: 58.8231°N 3.1719°W

Crockness Martello Tower is a Martello Tower on Hoy, Orkney, Scotland. It was built during the Napoleonic Wars, at the same time as the Martello Tower at Hackness. It is on the north side of Longhope Sound to the north of Crock Ness point and the hamlet of Crockness, while Hackness is on the south side of the Sound. Crockness Martello Tower is currently not open to the public.
