= David Monypenny, Lord Pitmilly =

Scottish lawyer

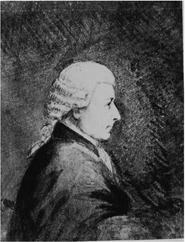
David Monypenny, Lord Pitmilly sketched by his colleague Robert Scott Moncrieff

The Hon. David Monypenny, Lord Pitmilly (1769–1850) was a Scottish lawyer who rose to be a Senator of the College of Justice.

== Life ==
He was born in May 1769 the son of Lt Col Alexander Monypenny of Pitmilly in Fife, and his wife Margaret Chamberlain.

After training in law he rose to be Sheriff of Fife from 1807 to 1811. From 1811 to 1813 he was Solicitor General for Scotland, succeeding David Boyle.

In February 1813 he took the place of the recently deceased Alexander Fraser Tytler, Lord Woodhouselee as a Senator of the College of Justice.

He retired in 1830 and began writing, especially on the then new Poor Laws.

He died in 1850.

== Family ==
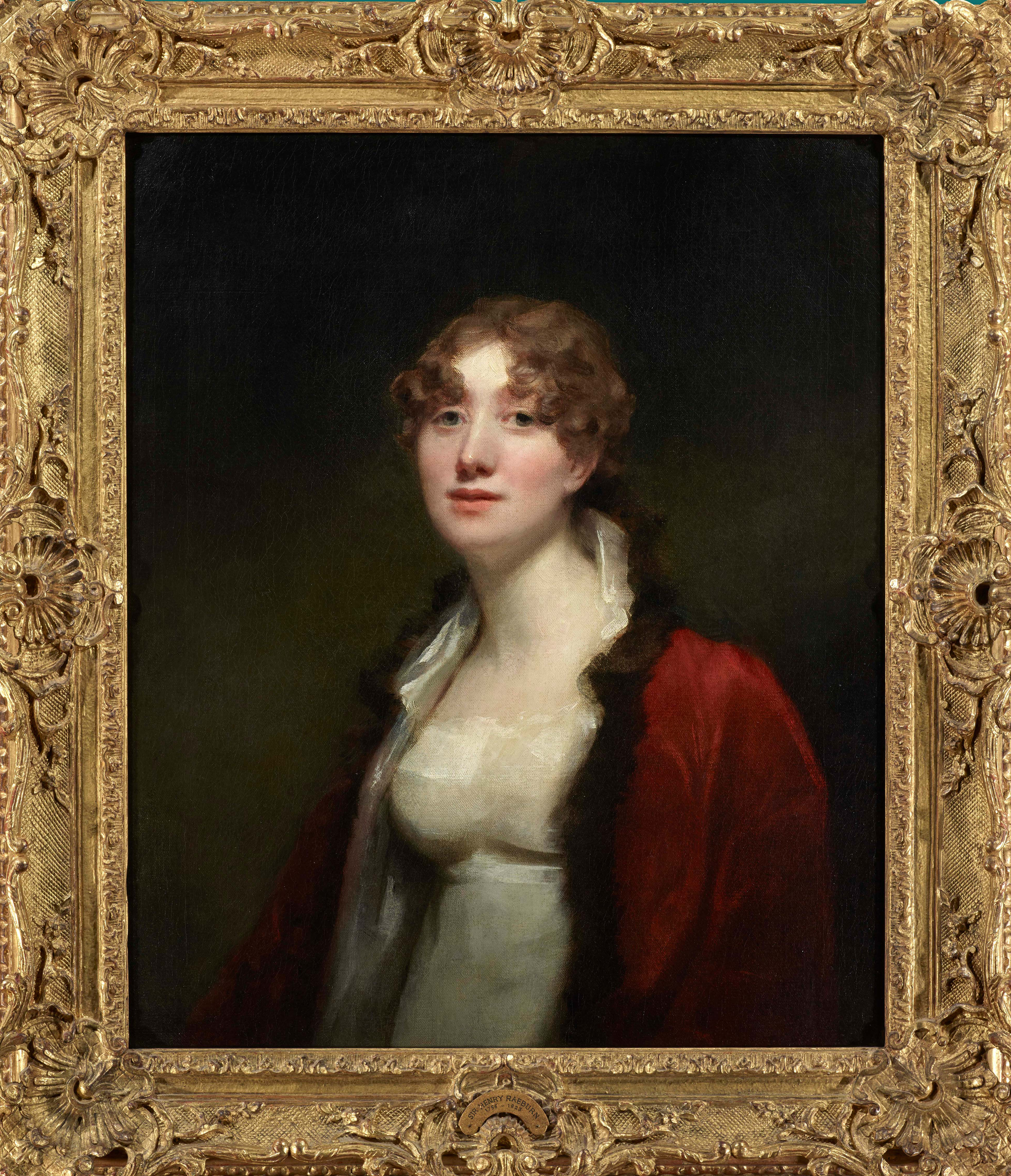
Portrait of Maria Sophia Abercromby, Lady Pitmilly (1781-1842) by Sir Henry Raeburn

In 1810 he married Maria-Sophia (d. 1846), daughter of Sir George Abercrombie, 4th Baronet of Birkenbog.

They had no children. His estates were inherited by his nephew, William Tankerville Monypenny.

His brothers included Alexander Monypenny, an Edinburgh lawyer, and William Monypenny, collector of customs in Kirkcaldy.

== Publications ==
- Remarks on the Poor Laws (1834)
- Proposed Alterations to the Scottish Poor Laws (1840)
