= Archibald Colquhoun (politician) =

Scottish politician and lawyer (1756–1820)

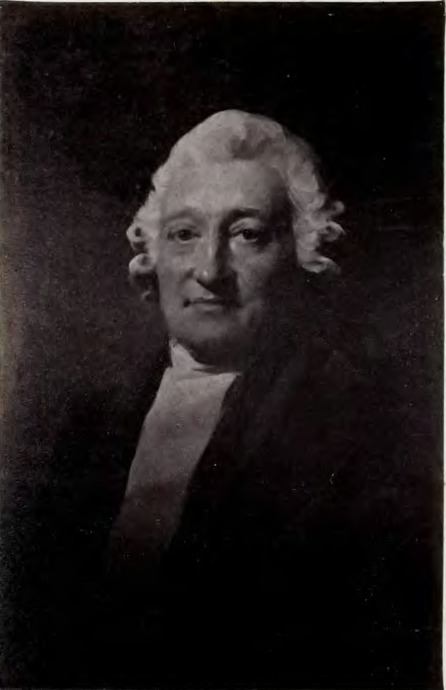
- portrait by Henry Raeburn
- Died: 8 December 1820
- Occupation: Politician
- Position held: member of the 4th Parliament of the United Kingdom (1807–1810), member of the 4th Parliament of the United Kingdom (1810–1812), member of the 5th Parliament of the United Kingdom (1812–1818), member of the 6th Parliament of the United Kingdom (1818–1820), member of the 7th Parliament of the United Kingdom (1820–1820), Lord Clerk Register (1816–1820)

Archibald Campbell Colquhoun (8 September 1756 – 8 December 1820) was a Scottish politician and lawyer from Glasgow. He served as Lord Advocate—the highest position in the Scottish legal system.

== Life ==
He was born Archibald Campbell in Glasgow in 1756, the only son of John Campbell of Clathick, Perthshire, (later Lord Provost of Glasgow 1788/90), and his wife Agnes Colquhoun, the only child of Laurence Colquhoun of Killermont, Dunbartonshire. On succeeding to the estate of Killermont upon the death of his father in 1804, he assumed the additional surname and arms of Colquhoun.

He studied Law at Glasgow University graduating in 1769 and was admitted an advocate in 1768 and appointed Sheriff of Perth from 1793 to 1807 and Rector of Glasgow University from 1807 to 1809.

On the downfall of the ministry of All the Talents, he was appointed Lord Advocate on 28 March 1807. At this time, a high ratio of the Scottish patronage of high level legal positions was in the hands of the Dundas family, and William Erskine, Alexander Maconochie. and Henry Cockburn were actually chosen deputes by Lord Melville before Colquhoun had received the appointment.

In the following May, he was returned as Member of Parliament for the Elgin district of burghs, but after three years resigned his seat. In July 1810 he was elected member for Dunbartonshire, which county he continued to represent until his death in 1820.

Colquhoun, as the Lord Advocate, took part in reforming the constitution of the Court of Session, and was appointed one of the thirteen commissioners who sat for the first time on 30 November 1808 for the purpose of inquiring into the administration of justice in Scotland. The correspondence between him and Erskine, the late lord advocate, on the subject of the respective merits of Lord Grenville's and Lord Eldon's bills for the reform of legal procedure will be found in the 'Scots Magazine' for 1808, pp. 70–2, 149–52. On the death of Lord Frederick Campbell, Colquhoun was appointed Lord Clerk Register, on 4 July 1816, much to the disappointment of Erskine's friends, who had hoped that the post would have been offered to him. He was a partner in the Thistle Bank of Glasgow, of which his father was co-founder.

Colquhoun died on 8 December 1820, after an illness of a few days, at the house of his son-in-law, Walter Long, at Hartham, Wiltshire, and was buried in the parish churchyard of New Kilpatrick near Glasgow.

== Family ==
In 1796 he married Mary Ann, daughter of the Rev. William Erskine, episcopalian minister at Muthill, Perthshire, and sister of William Erskine, afterwards Lord Kinneder. His wife survived him for many years, and died at Rothesay on 15 May 1833.

They had six daughters and two sons:

- John Campbell Colquhoun of Killermont and Garscadden,
- William Laurence Colquhoun, who died on 16 Jan. 1861.

Their eldest child died within a year of her birth, and it was on this occasion that Carolina Oliphant, afterwards Baroness Nairne, wrote The Land of the Leal, which she sent to her old friend Mrs. Colquhoun.

== Assessment ==
Colquhoun was a good classical scholar, a sound lawyer, and an eloquent pleader. Being a man of independent fortune and of reserved manners, he hardly took the position at the bar to which his abilities entitled him. His only reported speech does not appear to have been a great success. He rose 'amidst a tumultuous cry of Question! Question!' to take part in the debate on the Duke of York's conduct, and had not got very far when the house became 'so clamorous for the question that the hon. member could no longer be heard'.

Parliament of the United Kingdom
Preceded by George Skene	Member of Parliament for Elgin Burghs; 1807–1810	Succeeded by William Dundas
Preceded by Henry Glassford	Member of Parliament for Dunbartonshire; 1810–1821	Succeeded by John Buchanan
Legal offices
Preceded by Henry Erskine	Lord Advocate; 1807–1816	Succeeded by Alexander Maconochie
Political offices
Preceded by Lord Frederick Campbell	Lord Clerk Register; 1816–1820	Succeeded by William Dundas
Academic offices
Preceded by Henry Glassford of Dugalston	Rector of the University of Glasgow; 1807–1809	Succeeded by Archibald Campbell of Blythswood
