= 1941 in Scotland =

- Centuries: 18th; 19th; 20th; 21st
- Decades: 1920s; 1930s; 1940s; 1950s; 1960s
- See also: List of years in Scotland; Timeline of Scottish history 1941 in: The UK • Wales • Elsewhere; Scottish football: 1940–41 • 1941–42

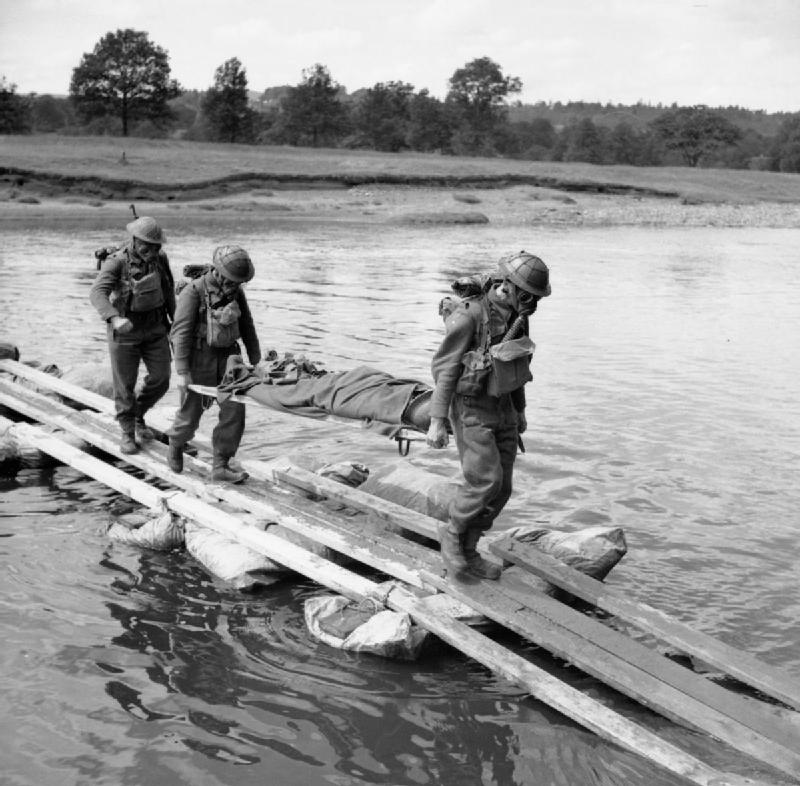
Norwegian troops, wearing gasmasks, carry a stretcher across a pontoon bridge made from sacks of straw and planks, at Carronbridge in Scotland, 9 July 1941.

Events from the year 1941 in Scotland.

== Incumbents ==
- Secretary of State for Scotland and Keeper of the Great Seal – Ernest Brown until 8 February; then Tom Johnston

=== Law officers ===
- Lord Advocate – Thomas Mackay Cooper until June; then James Reid
- Solicitor General for Scotland – James Reid until June; Sir David King Murray

=== Judiciary ===
- Lord President of the Court of Session and Lord Justice General – Lord Normand
- Lord Justice Clerk – Lord Aitchison, then Lord Cooper
- Chairman of the Scottish Land Court – Lord Murray, then Lord Gibson

== Events ==
- 17 January – a German Heinkel He 111 meteorological aircraft is crash-landed on Fair Isle.
- 5 February – the cargo ship SS Politician runs aground on Eriskay.
- 12 February – Tom Johnston is appointed Secretary of State for Scotland, a post which he holds until the end of the wartime coalition.
- 24 February – SS Jonathan Holt is torpedoed in a convoy off Cape Wrath by German submarine U-97 with the loss of 51 of her 57 crew, including English travel writer Robert Byron.
- 13–14 March – Clydebank Blitz: bombing of Clydebank.
- 6–7 May – Greenock Blitz: Greenock is intensively bombed.
- 10 May – Rudolf Hess parachutes into Scotland claiming to be on a peace mission.
- 12 May – the Honours of Scotland are secretly buried within Edinburgh Castle as a precaution against invasion.
- 2 June – 2 adults and 8 children are killed at Buckhaven when a naval mine explodes on the foreshore.
- 30 August – first official 'Shetland bus' clandestine mission using Norwegian fishing boats between Shetland and German-occupied Norway.
- September – the Royal Scots Greys, stationed in the Middle East, receive their first tanks, being the last of the cavalry regiments of the British Army to have abandoned horses for combat operations.
- October – exiled Czechoslovak Army personnel selected to carry out the assassination of Reinhard Heydrich begin their commando training at Arisaig.
- 5 November – the Commercial Bar in Fraserburgh receives a direct hit from a German bomb, killing over 30.
- Loudoun Castle is gutted by fire.
- The Polish School of Medicine at the University of Edinburgh founded

== Births ==
- 15 January – Colin Matthew, historian and academic (died 1999 in Oxford)
- 7 March – Stewart McLean, actor and businessman (died 2006)
- 8 March – Norman Stone, historian (died 2019 in Budapest)
- 9 March – Andy Lochhead, footballer (died 2022)
- 14 March – Ishbel MacAskill, Scottish Gaelic singer and teacher (died 2011)
- 9 April – Hannah Gordon, actress
- 10 April – John Kurila, footballer (died 2018)
- 9 May – John Wheatley, Lord Wheatley, lawyer and judge
- 18 May – Malcolm Longair, astrophysicist
- 22 May – Menzies Campbell, leader of the Liberal Democrats (UK) (died 2025)
- 22 May – Alec Monteath, actor and television announcer
- 19 June – Duncan Forbes, footballer (died 2019 in Norwich)
- 25 June – Eddie Large, born Edward McGinnis, comedian (died 2020 in Bristol)
- 30 June – Vincent Logan, Roman Catholic Bishop of Dunkeld (died 2021)
- 4 August – David R. Morrison, author, editor and painter (died 2012)
- 19 August – Tony Roper, actor
- 10 November – David Ashton, actor and writer
- 22 November – Tom Conti, actor
- 25 December – Kenneth Calman, medical researcher and academic (died 2025)_
- 31 December – Alex Ferguson, footballer and manager
- Jenni Calder, née Daiches, literary historian (born in the United States)
- Frances M Hendry, writer of children's historical fiction
- Anthony Miller, murderer, second-last criminal to be executed in Scotland (died 1960)
- Andrew Robertson, actor

== Deaths ==
- 3 January – William Mustart Lockhart, watercolour painter (born 1855)
- 6 April – Kenneth Campbell, airman, posthumous Victoria Cross recipient (born 1917; killed in action over Brest, France)
- 12 April – Charles Murray, Doric dialect poet and civil engineer (born 1864)
- 19 June – William James Cullen, Lord Cullen, judge (born 1859)
- 29 June – Sir Alexander MacEwen, solicitor, Provost of Inverness and first Scottish National Party leader (born 1875 in British India)
- 17 July – Charles Melvin, soldier, Victoria Cross recipient (born 1885)
- 3 December – Neil Harris, footballer and manager (born 1894)

== The arts ==
- A. J. Cronin's novel The Keys of the Kingdom is published.
- Compton Mackenzie's comic novel The Monarch of the Glen is published.
- Sydney Goodsir Smith's first collection Skail Wind - Poems is published in Edinburgh.

== See also ==
- Timeline of Scottish history
- 1941 in Northern Ireland
