= 1940 in Scotland =

- Centuries: 18th; 19th; 20th; 21st
- Decades: 1920s; 1930s; 1940s; 1950s; 1960s
- See also: List of years in Scotland; Timeline of Scottish history 1940 in: The UK • Wales • Elsewhere; Scottish football: 1939–40 • 1940–41

Events from the year 1940 in Scotland.

== Incumbents ==
- Secretary of State for Scotland and Keeper of the Great Seal – John Colville until 10 May; vacant until 14 May; then Ernest Brown

=== Law officers ===
- Lord Advocate – Thomas Mackay Cooper
- Solicitor General for Scotland – James Reid

=== Judiciary ===
- Lord President of the Court of Session and Lord Justice General – Lord Normand
- Lord Justice Clerk – Lord Aitchison
- Chairman of the Scottish Land Court – Lord Murray

== Events ==
- 1 January – the Marriage (Scotland) Act 1939 outlawed "irregular" marriages ("marriage by declaration" or "handfasting") from this date, ending the practice of "anvil marriage" at Gretna Green.
- 17 January – World War II: German submarine U-25 sank SS Polzella and the neutral Norwegian ship Enid 10 miles north of Shetland.
- 26 January – World War II: Requisitioned RMS Durham Castle, while being towed to Scapa Flow, was sunk by a mine probably laid by German submarine U-57 off the entrance to Cromarty Firth.
- 9 February – World War II: A German aircraft was forced down on North Berwick Law.
- February – The last mounted charge by a British cavalry regiment was made when the Royal Scots Greys were called to quell Arab rioters in Mandatory Palestine.
- 3–9 March – RMS Queen Elizabeth made her maiden voyage on delivery from Clydebank to New York.
- 11 March – World War II: Scotland north and west of the Great Glen and Inverness became a restricted area.
- 16 March – World War II: First civilian casualty of bombing in the UK, on Orkney.
- 10 April – World War II: the German cruiser Königsberg was sunk at Bergen by British Fleet Air Arm Blackburn Skua dive bombers flying from RNAS Hatston in Orkney.
- 30 April – French destroyer Maillé Brézé was sunk by accidental explosion off Greenock.
- May – construction of Churchill Barriers on Orkney began.
- 9 May – Guy Lloyd won the East Renfrewshire by-election for the Unionist Party.
- 29 May – World War II: Requisitioned Clyde steamers Queen-Empress, Duchess of Fife, Oriole (called Eagle on the Clyde), Marmion and Waverley took part in the Dunkirk evacuation; Waverley was lost.
- 12 June – World War II: More than 10,000 soldiers of the 51st (Highland) Division under General Victor Fortune surrendered to General Erwin Rommel at Saint-Valery-en-Caux.
- 16 June – World War II: The troopships Andes, Aquitania, Empress of Britain, Empress of Canada, Mauretania and Queen Mary steamed in convoy into the River Clyde and anchored off Gourock with the first large contingent of Australian and New Zealand troops.
- 24 June–1 July – World War II: Operation Fish – Royal Navy cruiser HMS Emerald sailed from Greenock in convoy to Halifax, Nova Scotia, carrying a large part of the gold reserves of the United Kingdom and securities for safe keeping in Canada. Another convoy set sail on 5 July from the Clyde, including HMS Batory, carrying cargo worth $1.7 billion, the largest movement of wealth in history.
- 1 July – World War II: First Luftwaffe daylight bombing raid on mainland Britain at Bank Row, Wick: 15 civilians, 8 of them children, killed.
- 19 July – World War II:
  - First Luftwaffe daylight raid on Glasgow; little damage was caused.
  - Radio Caledonia, ostensibly a nationalist anti-government station of a Scottish Peace Front but in fact a black propaganda operation of the Nazi Büro Concordia, begins broadcasting to Scotland, presented by Donald Grant. It continues nightly broadcasts intermittently until 24 July 1942, although with poor reception.
- 20 July – World War II: A Luftwaffe bomb largely destroyed the stand at King's Park F.C.'s Forthbank Park in Stirling, leading to the demise of the club.
- 16 September – World War II: British liner SS Aska was bombed by a German aircraft south of Gigha whilst carrying French troops from Gambia; 12 crew died but 75 survivors were picked up by trawlers.
- 18 September – World War II: Royal Navy heavy cruiser HMS Sussex is hit by bombs in Glasgow while undergoing mechanical repairs and is kept out of service until August 1942.
- November – World War II: Building of No. 1 Military Port at Faslane on the Gare Loch and No. 2 Military Port at Cairnryan began. Garelochhead Training Area is also established this year.
- Kilquhanity School near Castle Douglas was founded by John Aitkenhead.

== Births ==
- 6 January – John Byrne, playwright and artist
- 11 January – Sydney Devine, singer (died 2021)
- 18 January – Lindsay L. Cooper, jazz string player (died 2001)
- 24 February – Denis Law, international footballer (died 2025)
- 28 February – Jim Baikie, comics artist (died 2017)
- 2 March – Billy McNeill, Celtic footballer and manager (died 2019)
- 3 March – Patricia Gage, actress (died 2010 in Canada)
- 15 March – Jack Whyte, historical novelist (died 2021 in Canada)
- 19 April – Dougal Haston, mountaineer (killed 1977 in the Swiss Alps)
- 14 May
  - Chay Blyth, yachtsman and adventurer
  - Sir George Ross Mathewson, businessman
- 15 May – Lena Martell, born Helen Thomson, singer (died 2026))
- 23 May – Giles Gordon, author and agent (died 2003)
- 8 June - Stanley Robertson, folk singer, ballad singer and piper (died 2009)
- 23 June
  - Derry Irvine, Baron Irvine of Lairg, Lord Chancellor
  - Stuart Sutcliffe, pop musician and artist (died 1962 in Hamburg)
- 28 June – Roderick Wright, Bishop of Argyll and the Isles (Catholic) (died 2005 in New Zealand)
- 29 June – Bill Napier, astronomer and science fiction author
- 1 July – Craig Brown, footballer and Scotland national football team manager (died 2023)
- 10 July – Tom Farmer, entrepreneur (died 2025)
- 28 July – Brigit Forsyth, actress, born in Yorkshire (died 2023)
- 4 August – Robin Harper, Green politician
- 20 August – Gus Macdonald, television journalist and Labour politician
- 3 November – Charlie Gallagher, footballer (died 2021)
- 4 November – Sally Baldwin, social sciences professor (died 2003 in Italy)
- 24 November – Donald Macleod, theologian
- 1 December – Mike Denness, international cricketer (died 2013)
- William Barr, Arctic historian
- Peter Kerr, travel writer

== Deaths ==
- 11 February – John Buchan, 1st Baron Tweedsmuir, novelist, historian and Unionist politician (born 1875; died in Canada)
- 18 June – Sir George Andreas Berry, ophthalmologist and Unionist politician (born 1853)
- 19 November – James Cromar Watt, artist, architect and jeweller (born 1862)
- 16 December – William Wallace, classical composer and ophthalmologist (born 1860; died in England)
- Dugald Campbell, doctor from the Isle of Arran, set up the national health service in Hawaii during the 1890s

== The arts ==
- Publication of The Golden Treasury of Scottish Poetry edited by Hugh MacDiarmid.

== See also ==
- Timeline of Scottish history
- 1940 in Northern Ireland
