= 1939 in Scotland =

- Centuries: 18th; 19th; 20th; 21st
- Decades: 1910s; 1920s; 1930s; 1940s; 1950s
- See also: List of years in Scotland; Timeline of Scottish history 1939 in: The UK • Wales • Elsewhere; Scottish football: 1938–39 • 1939–40

Events from the year 1939 in Scotland.

== Incumbents ==
- Secretary of State for Scotland and Keeper of the Great Seal – John Colville

=== Law officers ===
- Lord Advocate – Thomas Mackay Cooper
- Solicitor General for Scotland – James Reid

=== Judiciary ===
- Lord President of the Court of Session and Lord Justice General – Lord Normand
- Lord Justice Clerk – Lord Aitchison
- Chairman of the Scottish Land Court – Lord Murray

== Events ==
- 2 January – all-time highest attendance for a U.K. Association football league game as 118,730 people watch Rangers beat Celtic in an "Old Firm derby" played at Ibrox Park in Glasgow.
- 1 May – RAF Lossiemouth formally opens.
- 3 September – World War II:
  - Declaration of war by the United Kingdom on Nazi Germany.
  - Clyde-built liner SS Athenia becomes the first civilian casualty of the war when she is torpedoed and sunk by German submarine U-30 in the vicinity of Rockall. Of the 1,418 aboard, 98 passengers and 19 crew are killed; the first survivors are brought in to Greenock. On 7 September, survivors are visited by John F. Kennedy, son of the US Ambassador and future 35th President of the United States.
- 4 September
  - Civil servants of the Scottish Office begin to occupy its first office in Scotland, St Andrew's House on Calton Hill in Edinburgh.
  - Several Citizens Advice Bureaux are founded in the United Kingdom to provide wartime information to the public, including Citizens Advice Edinburgh in Scotland.
- 30 September – Jackie Paterson wins the British flyweight boxing title in an open-air bout in Glasgow.
- 14 October – World War II: HMS Royal Oak sunk by a German U-boat in Scapa Flow, Orkney Islands with the loss of 833 crew.
- 16 October – World War II: first enemy aircraft shot down by RAF Fighter Command, a Junkers Ju 88 brought down into the sea by Spitfires following an attack on Rosyth Naval Dockyard.
- 17 October – World War II: first bomb lands in the U.K., at Hoy in the Orkney Islands.
- 28 October
  - A dust explosion in the colliery at Valleyfield, Fife, kills 35 people.
  - World War II: First enemy aircraft forced down on British soil by RAF Fighter Command, a Heinkel He 111 brought down near Humbie by a Spitfire flown by Archie McKellar following reconnaissance of the Firth of Clyde.
- 30 October – World War II: British battleship HMS Nelson is unsuccessfully attacked by U-56 under the command of captain Wilhelm Zahn off Orkney and is hit by three torpedoes, none of which explode; Winston Churchill (First Lord of the Admiralty), Admiral of the Fleet Dudley Pound (First Sea Lord) and Admiral Charles Forbes (Commander-in-Chief Home Fleet) are on board.
- 1 December – World War II: German submarine U-21 torpedoes Finnish vessel Mercator off Peterhead and the Norwegian Arcturus in the Firth of Forth.
- 2 December – World War II: Swedish cargo ship Rudolf hits a mine and sinks off St Abb's Head.
- 4 December – World War II: battleship HMS Nelson is badly damaged by a mine (laid by U-31) at the entrance to Loch Ewe.
- 12 December – escorting destroyer HMS Duchess (H64) sinks after a collision with battleship HMS Barham (04) off the Mull of Kintyre in heavy fog with the loss of 124 men.
- 17 December – Danish cargo ship Bogo sinks off Fife Ness.
- 21 December – boom defence vessel Bayonet explodes at Leith.
- HMS Spartiate is established as a Royal Navy shore establishment for Western Approaches Command at St Enoch's Hotel, Glasgow.
- Strathcarron Reservoir on the River Carron is completed.

== Births ==
- 7 March – Duncan Macmillan, art historian
- 16 April – Donald MacCormick, broadcast journalist (died 2009)
- 2 May – Mairi Hedderwick, illustrator
- 4 June – George Reid, politician, Presiding Officer of the Scottish Parliament 2003-2007 (died 2025)
- 8 June – Gordon Reid, actor (died 2003 in London)
- 9 June – Eric Fernie, art historian
- 11 June – Jackie Stewart, racing driver
- 16 July – Don Cameron, balloonist
- July – Wes Magee, poet and children's author (died 2021)
- 23 July – Donald Macgregor, marathon runner (died 2020)
- 29 September – Jim Baxter, international footballer (died 2001)
- 19 October – David Clark, Labour politician
- 31 October – Trish Godman, Labour politician (died 2019)
- 18 November – Ian McCulloch, actor
- Dugald Cameron, industrial designer
- The Mulgray Twins, Helen and Morna Mulgray, crime novelists

== Deaths ==
- 18 April – Ishbel Hamilton-Gordon, Marchioness of Aberdeen and Temair, patron and promoter of women's interests (born 1857 in London)
- 20 April – William Mitchell Ramsay, archaeologist and New Testament scholar (born 1851)
- 13 September – Henry Halcro Johnston, botanist, physician, rugby union international and Deputy Lieutenant for Orkney (born 1856)
- 21 September – George Washington Browne, architect (born 1853)
- Robert Bryden, artist and sculptor (born 1865)

== The arts ==
- 2 May – Molly Urquhart's repertory theatre company opens its first production, in Rutherglen.
- 18 May – Cosmo Cinema opens in Glasgow as an art film theatre.
- Erik Chisholm's sonata An Riobhan Dearg is composed.
- Ian Niall's novel Wigtown Ploughman: Part of His Life is published under the author's real name, John McNeillie.

== See also ==
- Timeline of Scottish history
- 1939 in Northern Ireland
