= 1943 in Scotland =

- Centuries: 18th; 19th; 20th; 21st
- Decades: 1920s; 1930s; 1940s; 1950s; 1960s
- See also: List of years in Scotland; Timeline of Scottish history 1943 in: The UK • Wales • Elsewhere; Scottish football: 1942–43 • 1943–44

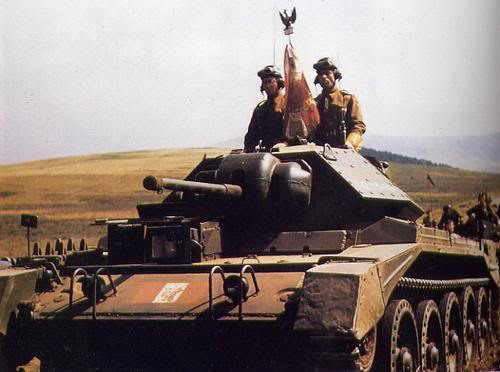
Polish 1st Armoured Division tanks Mk VI Crusader in Haddington, Scotland, Great Britain 1943.

Events from the year 1943 in Scotland.

== Incumbents ==
- Secretary of State for Scotland and Keeper of the Great Seal – Tom Johnston

=== Law officers ===
- Lord Advocate – James Reid
- Solicitor General for Scotland – Sir David King Murray

=== Judiciary ===
- Lord President of the Court of Session and Lord Justice General – Lord Normand
- Lord Justice Clerk – Lord Cooper
- Chairman of the Scottish Land Court – Lord Gibson

== Events ==
- 11 February – At the Midlothian and Peebles Northern by-election, the radical socialist Common Wealth Party candidate Tom Wintringham comes close to winning the seat (which is held for the Unionist Party by Sir David King Murray).
- 24 February – Royal Navy submarine HMS Vandal is lost with all 37 crew on sea trials in the Sound of Bute; she would not be located until 1994.
- 27 March – Royal Navy escort carrier HMS Dasher (D37) is destroyed by an accidental explosion in the Firth of Clyde, killing 379 of the crew of 528.
- 21 April – "Big Blitz" bombing of Aberdeen.
- 30 May – Royal Navy submarine HMS Untamed (P58) is lost with all hands on a training exercise in the Firth of Clyde.
- 19 June – Jackie Paterson wins the world flyweight boxing title by a knockout in the first minute at Hampden Park in Glasgow.
- 5 August – North of Scotland Hydro-Electric Board established by Act of Parliament (with headquarters in Edinburgh).
- 11 November – Total evacuation of an area near Portmahomack in Easter Ross begins, to make way for rehearsal of the Normandy Landings.
- 2 December – Broughty Ferry pigeon Winkie, serving with the Royal Air Force, is among the first recipients of the Dickin Medal, instituted to honour the work of animals in war.
- The last crofting family leaves the island of South Rona.
- Ferranti open a plant at Crewe Toll in Edinburgh, originally to manufacture gyro gunsights for aircraft.

== Births ==
- 23 January – Ernie Hannigan, footballer (died 2015 in Australia)
- 31 January – Peter McRobbie, screen actor in the United States
- 18 February – Graeme Garden, author, actor, comedian, artist and television presenter, one of The Goodies
- 1 March – Witold Rybczynski, Canadian American architect, born in Edinburgh
- 3 April – John Hughes, footballer (died 2022))
- 16 April – Morris Stevenson, footballer (died 2014)
- 19 April – Margo MacDonald, politician (died 2014)
- 1 May – Ian Dunn, gay and paedophile rights activist, founder of the Scottish Minorities Group (died 1998)
- 5 May – Kay Ullrich, politician (died 2021)
- 10 May – Jack Bruce, rock musician (died 2014)
- 22 June – J. Michael Kosterlitz, Scottish-born condensed matter physicist, recipient of the Nobel Prize in Physics
- 16 July – Ian Donald Cochrane Hopkins, comedy writer
- 18 July – Robin MacDonald, pop guitarist (died 2015)
- 20 August – Sylvester McCoy, born Percy James Patrick Kent-Smith, actor
- 16 October – Tommy Gemmell, footballer (died 2017)
- 24 November – Robin Williamson, acoustic musician
- 28 November – George T. Miller, film director (died 2023 in Australia)
- Alan Bold, poet and biographer (died 1998)
- G. C. Peden, historian
- D. R. Thorpe, biographer

== Deaths ==
- 17 June – Annie S. Swan, novelist (born 1859)
- 8 September - Anderson Gray McKendrick, military physician and epidemiologist, (born 1876)
- 15 October – William Soutar, poet (born 1898)
- 23 December – George Henry, painter (born 1858)
- Ann Scott-Moncrieff, author (born 1914)

== The arts ==
- November – Sorley MacLean's first collection of Gaelic poems, Dàin do Eimhir agus Dàin Eile, is published.
- Glasgow Citizens Theatre founded.
- Poetry Scotland magazine founded in Glasgow by Maurice Lindsay.

== See also ==
- Timeline of Scottish history
- 1943 in Northern Ireland
