= James Sharkey =

James Sharkey is the name of:

- Jim Sharkey (1934–2014), Scottish footballer
- James A. Sharkey (born 1945), Irish historian and diplomat
