= 1942 in Scotland =

- Centuries: 18th; 19th; 20th; 21st
- Decades: 1920s; 1930s; 1940s; 1950s; 1960s
- See also: List of years in Scotland; Timeline of Scottish history 1942 in: The UK • Wales • Elsewhere; Scottish football: 1941–42 • 1942–43

Events from the year 1942 in Scotland.

== Incumbents ==
- Secretary of State for Scotland and Keeper of the Great Seal – Tom Johnston

=== Law officers ===
- Lord Advocate – James Reid
- Solicitor General for Scotland – Sir David King Murray

=== Judiciary ===
- Lord President of the Court of Session and Lord Justice General – Lord Normand
- Lord Justice Clerk – Lord Cooper
- Chairman of the Scottish Land Court – Lord Gibson

== Events ==
- 19 January – a Catalina flying boat crashes on the hill above Burravoe on Yell, Shetland, killing seven of her ten passengers.
- April – Allied commandos training with live ammunition accidentally cause a major pine forest fire at Loch Arkaig.
- 28 April – Strathpeffer spa hospital (a hotel until 1940) is destroyed by fire.
- 15 May – RMS Queen Mary arrives at Greenock with nearly 10,000 U.S. troops aboard.
- July – military scientists begin testing of anthrax as a biological warfare agent on Gruinard Island.
- 25 August – Dunbeath air crash: Prince George, Duke of Kent, brother of George VI, is among 14 killed in a military air crash near Caithness.
- South Ford Bridge completed, connecting Benbecula to South Uist.
- Monach Islands deserted. Lighthouse on Shillay unlit.

== Births ==
- 5 January – Henry John Burnett, murderer, last man hanged in Scotland (died 1963)
- 24 January – Sheila Mullen, painter
- 2 February – Roger Hynd, footballer (died 2017)
- 21 February – Magnus Linklater, journalist
- 22 February – John Kerr, Baron Kerr of Kinlochard, diplomat
- 24 February – Stuart Henry, disc jockey (died 1995 in Luxembourg)
- 27 February – Aimi MacDonald, actress and dancer
- 12 April – Bill Bryden, theatre director
- 28 April – Geoffrey Hosking, historian
- 8 May – Norman Lamont, Conservative politician, Chancellor of the Exchequer
- 14 May – Prentis Hancock, actor
- 24 May – Fraser Stoddart, Scottish-born scientist, recipient of the Nobel Prize in Chemistry
- 7 June – Aonghas MacNeacail, Gaelic poet (died 2022)
- 18 June – John Bellany, painter (died 2013)
- 12 July – Tam White, actor and musician (died 2010)
- 8 August – Dennis Canavan, politician
- 12 August – Iain Blair, actor and author (using the pen name Emma Blair) (died 2011 England)
- 23 October – Douglas Dunn, poet and academic
- 16 November – Willie Carson, jockey
- 24 November – Billy Connolly, comedian
- 9 December – Billy Bremner, international footballer (died 1997)
- 10 December – Ann Gloag, born Ann Souter, entrepreneur
- 12 December – Morag Hood, actress (died 2002 London)
- 13 December – Hamish Wilson, actor
- 22 December – Irvine Laidlaw, Baron Laidlaw, businessman
- 27 December – Mike Heron, psychedelic rock musician (The Incredible String Band)
- Albert Watson, photographer

== Deaths ==
- 2 March - Charles Usher, ophthalmologist from whom Usher Syndrome is named (born 1865)
- 3 March - George Adam Smith, theologian (born 1856 in Calcutta)
- 10 August – Bob Kelso, footballer (born 1865)
- 4 December – Hugh Malcolm, Royal Air Force officer, posthumous recipient of the Victoria Cross (born 1917; killed in action over Tunisia)
- Andrew Allan, lithographic artist (born 1863)

== The arts ==
- Ena Lamont Stewart's first play, the one-act Distinguished Company, is presented by the MSU Repertory Theatre in Rutherglen.

== See also ==
- Timeline of Scottish history
- 1942 in Northern Ireland
