= 1945 in Northern Ireland =

- Centuries: 20th; 21st
- Decades: 1920s; 1930s; 1940s; 1950s; 1960s
- See also: 1945 in the United Kingdom; 1945 in Ireland; Other events of 1945; List of years in Northern Ireland

Events during the year 1945 in Northern Ireland.

== Incumbents ==
- Governor - The Duke of Abercorn (until 7 September), Earl Granville (from 7 September)
- Prime Minister - Basil Brooke

== Events ==
- 27 February – Aircraft carrier HMCS Bonaventure (CVL 22) is launched at the Harland and Wolff shipyard in Belfast to British Admiralty order as HMS Powerful.
- 8 May – V-E Day is celebrated throughout the UK.
- 14 May – Formal surrender of German U-boats at Londonderry Port (HMS Ferret, Lisahally). As part of Operation Deadlight many are scuttled offshore.
- 16 May – Éamon de Valera replies in a radio broadcast to Winston Churchill's criticism of Irish neutrality.
- 26 July – 1945 United Kingdom general election.
- 15 August – V-J Day is celebrated in the UK.
- 21 August – Two Nationalist Members of Parliament, Eddie McAteer and Malachy Conlon, take the Oath of Allegiance and enter the Parliament of the United Kingdom at Westminster.
- 15 October – Professor Eoin MacNeill dies in Dublin aged 77. He was a founder-member of the Gaelic League and the Irish Volunteers.
- 14 November – A convention meeting in Dungannon establishes the nationalist Irish Anti-Partition League.

== Arts and literature ==
- John Luke paints The Old Callan Bridge and The Three Dancers.
- F. L. Green's novel Odd Man Out is published.

== Sport ==
=== Football ===
- Irish League

Winners: Linfield

- Irish Cup

Winners: Linfield 4 – 2 Glentoran

== Births ==
- 29 January – Jim Nicholson, Unionist politician and MEP for Northern Ireland.
- 12 June – Pat Jennings, international soccer player.
- 4 July – David McWilliams, singer, songwriter and guitarist (died 2002).
- 18 July – Pat Doherty, politician
- 16 August – Allan Bresland, DUP Northern Ireland Assembly member for West Tyrone.
- 25 August – Sammy Duddy, member of the Ulster Political Research Group (died 2007).
- 31 August – Van Morrison, singer and songwriter.
- 15 September – Dave Clements, soccer player and manager.
- 21 September – Shaw Clifton, General of The Salvation Army.
- 17 October – Jimmy Cricket (James Mulgrew), comedian (died 2026).
- 31 October – Bobbie Hanvey, photographer and radio personality.
- 17 November – Damien Magee, racing driver.
- 5 December – Evin Crowley, actress.

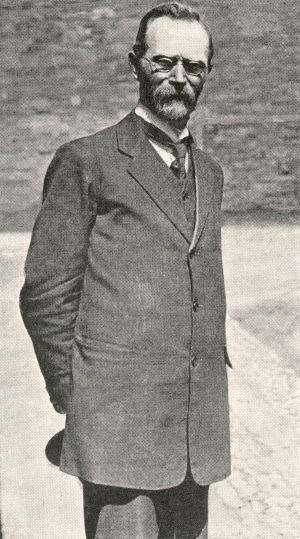
Eoin MacNeill

=== Full date unknown ===
- Brendan Hamill, poet and writer.
- Martin Meehan, Sinn Féin politician, previously volunteer in the Provisional Irish Republican Army (died 2007).
- Ernie Rea, religious broadcaster.
- Graham Reid, playwright.
- James A. Sharkey, historian and Irish diplomat.

== Deaths ==
- 13 October – Joseph MacRory, Cardinal, Archbishop of Armagh and Primate of All Ireland (born 1861).
- 15 October – Eoin MacNeill, scholar, nationalist and revolutionary (born 1867).
- 20 December – John M. Lyle, architect in Canada (born 1872).

== See also ==
- 1945 in Scotland
- 1945 in Wales
