= 2020 in Scotland =

- Centuries: 19th; 20th; 21st
- Decades: 2000s; 2010s; 2020s
- See also: List of years in Scotland; Timeline of Scottish history 2020 in: The UK • England • Wales • Elsewhere; Scottish football: 2019–20 • 2020–21; 2020 in Scottish television

Events from the year 2020 in Scotland

== Incumbents ==
- First Minister – Nicola Sturgeon
- Secretary of State for Scotland – Alister Jack

== Events ==
=== January ===
- 29 January – MSPs vote 64–54 to back calls for a second Scottish independence referendum.

=== February ===
- 6 February – Derek Mackay resigns as Finance Secretary hours before delivering his budget following reports that he messaged a sixteen-year-old boy on social media over a period of several months.
- 14 February – Jackson Carlaw is elected as leader of the Scottish Conservative Party.
- 24 February – The last speaker of East Sutherland Gaelic, Jessie Ross, dies at 89 years old, making the dialect extinct.
- 17 February – Kate Forbes is appointed as Finance Secretary, the first woman to hold the post.

=== March ===
- 1 March – COVID-19 pandemic in Scotland: Authorities confirm the first case of the global COVID-19 pandemic in Scotland, the index case of coronavirus being a traveller having returned from Italy.
- 13 March – COVID-19 pandemic in Scotland: Authorities confirm the first death from COVID-19 in Scotland.

=== April ===
- 3 April – The results of the 2020 Scottish Labour deputy leadership election are announced, in which Jackie Baillie is elected as the deputy leader of Scottish Labour.

=== June ===
- 21 June – The 'Peebles Hoard', comprising Bronze Age horse harness, a sword in its scabbard and other artefacts including a "rattle pendant", is discovered near Peebles in the Borders by a metal detectorist.
- 26 June – Glasgow hotel stabbings.

=== August ===
- 4 August – The Scottish Qualifications Authority issues moderated grades to school pupils who have not been able to take examinations due to the COVID-19 pandemic; on 10 August, Nicola Sturgeon publicly accepts that her government "did not get it right" over this procedure.
- 5 August – Following the resignation on 30 July of Jackson Carlaw as leader of the Scottish Conservatives, he is succeeded by Douglas Ross MP.
- 11 August – Ruth Davidson is appointed Leader of the Scottish Conservatives in the Scottish Parliament by Douglas Ross, becoming the Leader of the Opposition again.
- 12 August – Stonehaven derailment: A passenger train derails after striking a landslip near Stonehaven in Aberdeenshire, with 3 deaths.

=== October ===
- 15 October – Kintore railway station reopens.

=== November ===
- 25 November – Scotland becomes the first country in the world to make it a legal duty for period products to be available to anyone for free after the Period Products (Free Provision) (Scotland) Bill is approved.

== Deaths ==
=== January ===
- 6 January – Danny Masterton, footballer (Ayr United, Clyde) (born 1954)
- 12 January – Jackie Brown, boxer, Commonwealth Games gold medallist (1958), British and Commonwealth flyweight champion (1962–1963) (born 1935)
- 15 January – Bobby Brown, Hall of Fame footballer (Rangers, Queen's Park) and manager (national team) (born 1923)

=== February ===
- 6 February – Jimmy Moran, footballer (Norwich City, Northampton Town, Workington) (born 1935)

=== March ===
- 9 March – George Strachan, cricketer (national team) (born 1932)
- 11 March – Dave Souter, footballer (Clyde, Dundee) (born 1940)
- 12 March – Alexander Gordon, 7th Marquess of Aberdeen and Temair, peer (born 1955)
- 30 March – Alex Forsyth, footballer (Darlington) (born 1928)

=== April ===
- 5 April – Dougie Morgan, rugby union player (Stewart's Melville, British and Irish Lions, national team) (born 1947)
- 14 April – Ron Wylie, footballer and manager (Notts County, Aston Villa, Birmingham City, West Bromwich Albion) (born 1933)
- 23 April – John Murphy, footballer (Ayr United) (born 1942)

=== May ===
- 1 May – Derek Ogg, lawyer (born 1954)
- 2 May – John Ogilvie, footballer (Hibernian, Leicester City, Mansfield Town), COVID-19 (born 1928)

=== July ===
- 9 July – Johnny Beattie, actor (River City) and comedian (Scotch & Wry, Rab C. Nesbitt) (born 1926)
- 13 July – Pat Quinn, footballer (Motherwell, national team) and manager (East Fife) (born 1936)
- 15 July – Maurice Roëves, actor (Oh! What a Lovely War, Escape to Victory, Judge Dredd) (born 1937)
- 17 July – Alex Dawson, footballer (Manchester United, Preston North End, Brighton & Hove Albion) (born 1940)
- 21 July – Hugh McLaughlin, footballer (St Mirren, Third Lanark, Queen of the South) (born 1945)
- 24 July – David Hagen, footballer (Falkirk, Clyde, Peterhead), motor neuron disease (born 1973)

=== August ===
- 4 August – Willie Hunter, footballer (Motherwell, national team) and manager (Queen of the South) (born 1940)

=== September ===
- 7 September – Logie Bruce Lockhart, rugby union player (national team), schoolmaster, writer and journalist (born 1921)
- 20 September – Sir Malcolm Innes of Edingight, herald, Lord Lyon King of Arms of Scotland (1981–2001) (born 1938)

=== November ===
- 22 November – Hamish MacInnes, mountaineer (born 1930)

=== December ===
- 21 December – Sandy Grant Gordon, whisky distiller (born 1931)
- 26 December – Jim McLean, footballer and manager (Dundee United) (born 1937)

== The Arts ==
- 11 February – Douglas Stuart's debut novel Shuggie Bain, a story of growing up in 1980s Glasgow, is first published in the United States; it wins this year's Booker Prize.
- October – Two of the five winners of the UK 2020 ArtFund Museum of the Year Award are Aberdeen Art Gallery and Gairloch Museum.

== See also ==
- 2020 in England
- 2020 in Northern Ireland
- 2020 in Wales
