= 1941 in Northern Ireland =

- Centuries: 20th; 21st
- Decades: 1920s; 1930s; 1940s; 1950s; 1960s
- See also: 1941 in the United Kingdom; 1941 in Ireland; Other events of 1941; List of years in Northern Ireland

Events during the year 1941 in Northern Ireland.

== Incumbents ==
- Governor - The Duke of Abercorn
- Prime Minister - J. M. Andrews

== Events ==
- 21 February – First flight by a Royal Air Force flying boat through the "Donegal Corridor", neutral Republic of Ireland airspace between its base in Northern Ireland and the Atlantic Ocean, a concession secretly agreed by Éamon de Valera.
- 15 April – The Belfast blitz: 1,000 people are killed in bombing raids on Belfast. 71 firemen with 13 fire tenders from Dundalk, Drogheda, Dublin, and Dún Laoghaire cross the Irish border to assist their Belfast colleagues.
- May - Broadcasting House, Belfast opens.
- 5 May – Belfast suffers its third bombing raid during World War II. The Dublin government authorises its emergency services to assist again.
- 26 May – A special sitting of Dáil Éireann unanimously condemns the introduction of conscription in Northern Ireland.
- 27 May – Speaking in the House of Commons of the United Kingdom, Prime Minister Winston Churchill rules out the introduction of conscription in the North.

== Arts and literature ==
- Robert Greacen's poetry The Bird is published.
- Louis MacNeice's poetry Plant and Phantom is published.
- W. R. Rodgers's Awake! And Other Poems is published.

== Sport ==
=== Football ===
- Irish League

Winners: Belfast Celtic

- Irish Cup

Winners: Belfast Celtic 1 - 0 Linfield

== Births ==
- 13 May – Miles Kington, comic journalist (died 2008).
- 30 May – George Robinson, Democratic Unionist Party MLA.
- 8 June – Robert Bradford, footballer and politician (died 1981).
- 10 June – John MaGowan, darts player.
- 24 June – Gerard Clifford, Auxiliary Bishop of Armagh (1991 - ).
- June – Paddy Higson, film producer (died 2025).
- 6 July – David Crystal, linguist.
- 15 July – Leslie Cree, Ulster Unionist Party MLA.
- 23 August – Onora O'Neill, Baroness O'Neill of Bengarve, philosopher and academic.
- 19 September – Martin Harvey, footballer (died 2019).
- 2 October – Michael Campbell, Roman Catholic Bishop of Lancaster.
- 20 October – Stewart Parker, poet and playwright (died 1988).
- 28 October – John Hallam, actor (died 2006).
- 7 November – Ian Cochrane, novelist (died 2004).
- 23 November – Derek Mahon, poet (died 2020).
- 15 December – Jim Wilson, Ulster Unionist Party MLA.

== Deaths ==
- 10 January – John Lavery, artist (born 1856).
- 13 March – Finlay Jackson, cricketer and rugby player (born 1901).
- 19 February – Hamilton Harty, conductor and composer (born 1879).

== See also ==
- 1941 in Scotland
- 1941 in Wales
