= 1940 in Northern Ireland =

- Centuries: 20th; 21st
- Decades: 1920s; 1930s; 1940s; 1950s; 1960s
- See also: 1940 in the United Kingdom; 1940 in Ireland; Other events of 1940; List of years in Northern Ireland

Events during the year 1940 in Northern Ireland.

== Incumbents ==
- Governor - The Duke of Abercorn
- Prime Minister - James Craig (until 24 November), J. M. Andrews (from 27 November)

== Events ==
- 2 January – The Royal Ulster Constabulary finds 2½ tons of the ammunition stolen in last year's Irish Republican Army Dublin Christmas Raid inside County Armagh.
- 27 May – The new Churchill war ministry in London agrees to seek co-operation from Éamon de Valera and creation of an All-Ireland Council during "the present emergency".
- 1 June – Sale of the neutralist Derry Journal in Northern Ireland is prohibited for four days.
- 4 July – Taoiseach Éamon de Valera announces that the policy of neutrality adopted the previous September will not be reversed.
- 7 November – Éamon de Valera, speaking in response to Winston Churchill's statement, says that there can be no question of handing over Irish ports for use by British forces while they retain control of Northern Ireland.
- 24 November – James Craig, the first Prime Minister of Northern Ireland, dies suddenly. He was the longest continually serving prime minister in Europe.
- Ballymena, Cushendall and Red Bay Railway (part of Belfast and Northern Counties Railway) ceases operations.

== Arts and literature ==
- The Northern Ireland Players join with the Ulster Theatre and the Jewish Institute Dramatic Society to form the Group Theatre.
- Opening of the Vogue Cinema, Kilkeel, County Down, a notable example of modern architecture, designed by Ben Cowser.
- Louis MacNeice publishes his poetry collection The Last Ditch (including "The Coming of War" sequence).

== Sport ==
=== Football ===
- Irish League

Winners: Belfast Celtic

- Irish Cup

Winners: Ballymena United 2 - 0 Glenavon

== Births ==
- 26 January – Séamus Hegarty, Bishop of Derry (1994 - ).
- 5 February – Andy Tyrie, loyalist paramilitary.
- 7 February – Harold McCusker, Ulster Unionist Party MP (died 1990).
- 9 February – Seamus Deane, poet, critic and novelist (died 2021).
- 11 February – Anne Gregg, travel writer and television presenter (died 2006).
- 24 March – Sam Gardiner, Ulster Unionist Party MLA.
- 6 June – Willie John McBride, international rugby player.
- 26 July – Brian Mawhinney, Conservative Party (UK) MP and football executive (died 2019 in the United Kingdom).
- 31 July – Roy Walker, comedian and television presenter.
- 29 August – P. J. Bradley, SDLP MLA (died 2017).
- 6 September – Anthony Farquhar, Auxiliary Bishop of Diocese of Down and Connor.
- 26 November – Charles Corry, cricketer.
- 22 December – Jim McLaughlin, footballer and football manager.
- Philip Caves, cardiothoracic surgeon (died 1978 in the United Kingdom).

== Deaths ==
- 24 November – James Craig, 1st Viscount Craigavon, first Prime Minister of Northern Ireland (born 1871).

== See also ==
- 1940 in Scotland
- 1940 in Wales
