= 1938 in Scotland =

- Centuries: 18th; 19th; 20th; 21st
- Decades: 1910s; 1920s; 1930s; 1940s; 1950s
- See also: List of years in Scotland; Timeline of Scottish history 1938 in: The UK • Wales • Elsewhere; Scottish football: 1937–38 • 1938–39

Events from the year 1938 in Scotland.

== Incumbents ==
- Secretary of State for Scotland and Keeper of the Great Seal – Walter Elliot until 16 May; then John Colville

=== Law officers ===
- Lord Advocate – Thomas Mackay Cooper
- Solicitor General for Scotland – James Reid

=== Judiciary ===
- Lord President of the Court of Session and Lord Justice General – Lord Normand
- Lord Justice Clerk – Lord Aitchison
- Chairman of the Scottish Land Court – Lord MacGregor Mitchell, then Lord Murray

== Events ==
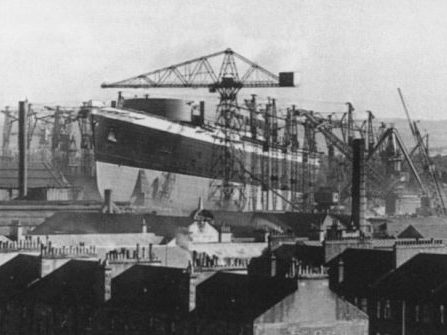
Queen Elizabeth on the stocks

- 27 April – Second Division team East Fife F.C. uniquely win the Scottish Cup in Association football.
- 3 May – Empire Exhibition opens in Glasgow.
- 30 July – The Beano comic, published by D. C. Thomson & Co. of Dundee, goes on sale across the U.K.
- 27 September – RMS Queen Elizabeth is launched at Clydebank; she is the largest ship in the world at this time.
- Iona Community established by Rev. George MacLeod in Glasgow.
- English landowner David Freeman-Mitford, 2nd Baron Redesdale, buys the island of Inch Kenneth.
- The Hermitage of Braid estate, adjacent to Blackford Hill, is gifted to the city of Edinburgh for recreational purposes by John McDougal.
- The Neolithic settlement of Rinyo on Rousay in Orkney is excavated by V. Gordon Childe.
- Broughton Place at Broughton in the Borders is built in the style of a traditional tower house by Basil Spence incorporating decorative reliefs by Hew Lorimer.
- Turner & Newall establish an asbestos cement plant at Dalmuir.
- Agnes Mure Mackenzie publishes The Foundations of Scotland, the first of a 6-volume history.

== Births ==
- 1 January – Dolina MacLennan, Leòdhasach traditional singer, actress and Gaelic broadcaster
- 2 January – Ian Brady, born Ian Duncan Stewart, serial killer (died 2017 in Ashworth Hospital)
- 16 February – Willie Hamilton, footballer (died 1976 in Canada)
- 7 March – Alan Cousin, footballer (died 2016)
- 31 March
  - Ian Gray, comics scriptwriter (died 2007)
  - David Steel, UK Liberal Member of Parliament and Liberal Democrat leader and 1st Presiding Officer of the Scottish Parliament
- 16 April – Gordon Wilson, Scottish National Party leader (died 2017)
- 5 June – Moira Anderson, singer
- 18 June – Michael Sheard, character actor (died 2005)
- 27 June – David Hope, judge
- 7 June – Ian St John, footballer and manager (died 2021 in England)
- 28 July – Ian McCaskill, weatherman (died 2016)
- 13 September – John Smith, UK Labour Party leader (died 1994 in London)
- 14 September – Nicol Williamson, actor (died 2011)
- 20 October – Iain Macmillan, photographer (died 2006)
- 22 October – Alan Gilzean, footballer (died 2018)
- 25 November – Maria Fyfe, née O'Neill, politician (died 2020)
- 28 November – Frank Haffey, goalkeeper
- 16 December – Neil Connery, actor, younger brother of Sean Connery (died 2021)
- John Paisley, actor, working in China
- Roland Poska, graphic artist (died 2017 in the United States)

== Deaths ==
- 31 January – Sir James Crichton-Browne, psychiatrist (born 1840)
- 9 April – Moses McNeil, footballer, a founder of Rangers F.C. (born 1855)
- 11 April – David Alan Stevenson, lighthouse designer (born 1854)
- 25 April – Robert MacGregor Mitchell, Lord MacGregor Mitchell, Chairman of the Scottish Land Court 1934–38 (born 1875)
- 29 April – James Pittendrigh Macgillivray, sculptor and poet (born 1856)
- 2 July – John James Burnet, architect (born 1857)
- 29 August – John Macdonald, sportsman and physician (died 1861)

== The arts ==
- Hugh S. Roberton writes the "Mingulay Boat Song".

== See also ==
- Timeline of Scottish history
- 1938 in Northern Ireland
