= 1946 in Northern Ireland =

- Centuries: 20th; 21st
- Decades: 1920s; 1930s; 1940s; 1950s; 1960s
- See also: 1946 in the United Kingdom; 1946 in Ireland; Other events of 1946; List of years in Northern Ireland

Events during the year 1946 in Northern Ireland.

== Incumbents ==
- Governor - Earl Granville
- Prime Minister - Basil Brooke

== Events ==
- 19 March – British Royal Navy aircraft carrier HMS Eagle (R05) (laid down 1942) is launched at the Harland and Wolff shipyard in Belfast. Work on HMS Powerful is suspended this year until she is recommenced in 1952 as HMCS Bonaventure (CVL 22).
- 6 June – 1946 Down by-election: The Ulster Unionist Party gain Down in a by-election.
- 1 December – Nutts Corner opens as Northern Ireland's principal civil airport, replacing Belfast Harbour.
- Homeless families from Derry begin to occupy the former United States Navy Springtown Camp.

== Arts and literature ==
- John Luke holds his first one-man exhibition, at the Belfast Museum and Art Gallery, and paints Northern Rhythm.

== Sport ==
=== Football ===
- Irish League

Winners: Linfield

- Irish Cup

Winners: Linfield 3 - 0 Distillery

== Births ==
=== January to June ===
- 9 February – Seán Neeson, Alliance Party of Northern Ireland politician
- 26 March – Carmel Hanna, SDLP MLA.
- 30 April – Fred Cobain, Ulster Unionist Party MLA
- 4 May – John Watson, racing car driver.
- 22 May – George Best, footballer (died 2005).
- 25 May – Norah Beare, Ulster Unionist, later Democratic Unionist Party, politician.
- 21 June – Kate Hoey, Labour Party politician in the United Kingdom.
- 30 June – Allan Hunter, footballer.

=== July to December ===
- 31 October – Stephen Rea, actor.
- 28 November – Barry Devlin, bass-player with Horslips.
- 31 December – Bryan Hamilton, footballer and football manager.

=== Full date unknown ===
- Maurice Harron, sculptor.
- Inez McCormack, trade union leader (died 2013).
- Tom McGurk, poet, journalist and broadcaster.
- Freddie Scappaticci, accused of being a high-level double agent in the Provisional Irish Republican Army.
- Raymond Snoddy, journalist and broadcaster.

== See also ==
- 1946 in Scotland
- 1946 in Wales
