= 1944 in Northern Ireland =

- Centuries: 20th; 21st
- Decades: 1920s; 1930s; 1940s; 1950s; 1960s
- See also: 1944 in the United Kingdom; 1944 in Ireland; Other events of 1944; List of years in Northern Ireland

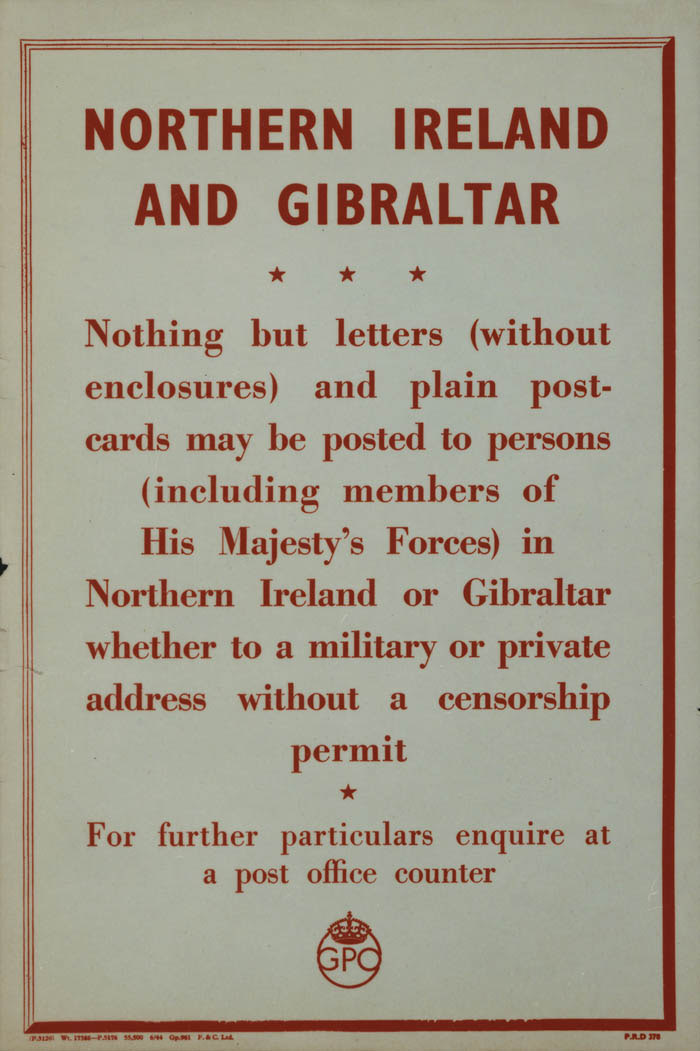
1944 Post Office Notice re sending letter from UK to Northern Ireland and Gibraltar only without a censorship permit

This is a list of events that happened in Northern Ireland in 1944.

== Incumbents ==
- Governor - The Duke of Abercorn
- Prime Minister - Basil Brooke

== Events ==
- 13 March – The British Government prohibits all travel between Great Britain and Ireland.

=== Visit by General Eisenhower ===
- 17 May – American General Dwight D. Eisenhower, Supreme Commander of the Allied Expeditionary Force, visits Northern Ireland for two days to inspect United States troops in preparation for the Normandy landings on D-Day the following month. The general arrives from RAF Burtonwood in Lancashire and lands at Greencastle Airfield in Kilkeel, County Down. He inspects troops there and in Newcastle, and observes a simulated attack in Dundrum. At Ballykinler he observes small unit training. Leaving County Down, he is driven to the Headquarters of XV Corps at Brownlow House in Lurgan, County Armagh for dinner with other senior military personnel.
- 18 May – Eisenhower inspects infantry in Counties Fermanagh and Tyrone.
- 19 May – Eisenhower visits Bangor, County Down to inspect American warships in Belfast Lough. He observes onshore military exercises at Ballyholme Bay then flies from Ballyhalbert Airfield in County Down to RAF Bovingdon in Hertfordshire in the evening.

- 20 May – Aircraft carrier HMS Warrior (R31) is launched at the Harland and Wolff shipyard in Belfast to British Admiralty order.
- 22 August – Men from Tyrone and Fermanagh form an Anti-Partition League in Dublin.
- 16 November – Aircraft carrier HMCS Magnificent (CVL 21) is launched at the Harland and Wolff shipyard in Belfast to British Admiralty order.

== Arts and literature ==
- Robert Greacen's poetry Northern Harvest and One Recent Evening is published.
- Forrest Reid's novel Young Tom is published.
- John Luke paints The Road to the West.

== Sport ==
=== Football ===
- Irish League

Winners: Belfast Celtic

- Irish Cup

Winners: Belfast Celtic 3 - 1 Linfield

== Births ==
- 5 January – Edward Haughey, Baron Ballyedmond, businessman (killed in helicopter accident in England 2014).
- 27 January – Mairead Corrigan, peace activist, recipient of the Nobel Peace Prize.
- 20 March – Alan Harper, Church of Ireland Archbishop of Armagh and Primate of All Ireland (2007-2012).
- 28 March – Nell McCafferty, journalist, writer and playwright (died 2024).
- 28 May – Patricia Quinn, actress.
- 3 June – Tom Burns, Roman Catholic Bishop of the Forces in Great Britain (2002-2008).
- 8 June – David Craig, footballer.
- 28 June – Ian Adamson, Ulster Unionist Lord Mayor of Belfast (died 2019).
- 24 July – Jim Armstrong, guitarist.
- 15 October – David Trimble, leader of the Ulster Unionist Party, recipient of the Nobel Peace Prize (died 2022).
- 28 October – Gerry Anderson, radio and television broadcaster (died 2014).
- Spring – Ruth Patterson, first woman to be ordained to the ministry of the Presbyterian Church in Ireland.
- Polly Devlin, writer.
- Colin McClelland, journalist.

== Deaths ==
- June - Joseph Campbell, poet and lyricist (born 1879).
- August - Noble Huston, Presbyterian minister and dog breeder.
- 28 November – Sir William Moore, 1st Baronet, Unionist MP and Lord Chief Justice of Northern Ireland 1925-1937 (born 1864).

== See also ==
- 1944 in Scotland
- 1944 in Wales
