= 1943 in Northern Ireland =

- Centuries: 20th; 21st
- Decades: 1920s; 1930s; 1940s; 1950s; 1960s
- See also: 1943 in the United Kingdom; 1943 in Ireland; Other events of 1943; List of years in Northern Ireland

Events during the year 1943 in Northern Ireland.

== Incumbents ==
- Governor - The Duke of Abercorn
- Prime Minister - J. M. Andrews (until 1 May), Basil Brooke (from 1 May)

== Events ==
- 9 February – The Belfast West by-election is won by the Northern Ireland Labour Party candidate Jack Beattie
- 1 May – Sir Basil Brooke becomes Prime Minister of Northern Ireland.
- 17 June – British aircraft carrier HMS Campania (D48) is launched at the Harland and Wolff shipyard in Belfast.
- 29 July – Cruiser HMCS Ontario (C53) is launched at the Harland and Wolff shipyard in Belfast to British Admiralty order.
- 27 November – British aircraft carrier HMS Glory (R62) is launched at the Harland and Wolff shipyard in Belfast by Lady Brooke.

== Arts and literature ==
- Release of the Crown Film Unit drama documentary short A Letter From Ulster directed by Brian Desmond Hurst assisted by William MacQuitty.
- Roy McFadden's poetry Swords and Ploughshares is published.
- John Luke paints Pax.

== Sport ==
=== Football ===
- Irish League

Winners: Linfield

- Irish Cup

Winners: Belfast Celtic 1 - 0 Glentoran

== Births ==
- 18 February – George Campbell, politician in Australia.
- 27 February – Jimmy Nicholson, footballer.
- 10 March – Eamonn McCann, journalist and political activist.
- 8 April – Tony Banks, Baron Stratford, politician (died 2006).
- 16 April – Tom Lewis, singer-songwriter.
- 6 May – Peter Jackson, rugby journalist.
- 14 May – John Cushnie, gardener and broadcaster (died 2009).
- 22 May – Betty Williams, peace campaigner, recipient of the Nobel Peace Prize (died 2020).
- 18 June – Willie Irvine, footballer.
- 15 July – Jocelyn Bell Burnell, astrophysicist.
- 21 July – Henry McCullough, guitarist.
- 15 August – Eileen Bell, Alliance Party MLA.
- 28 October – Kenneth Montgomery, conductor (died 2023 in the Netherlands).
- 31 October – Stephen Rea, actor.
- Full date unknown – Billy Brown, musician and artist (died 1999).

== Deaths ==
- 19 July – Robert Alexander, rugby and cricket player (born 1910).

== See also ==
- 1943 in Scotland
- 1943 in Wales
