= 1936 in Scotland =

- Centuries: 18th; 19th; 20th; 21st
- Decades: 1910s; 1920s; 1930s; 1940s; 1950s
- See also: List of years in Scotland; Timeline of Scottish history 1936 in: The UK • Wales • Elsewhere; Scottish football: 1935–36 • 1936–37

Events from the year 1936 in Scotland.

== Incumbents ==
- Secretary of State for Scotland and Keeper of the Great Seal – Sir Godfrey Collins until 29 October; then Walter Elliot

=== Law officers ===
- Lord Advocate – Thomas Mackay Cooper
- Solicitor General for Scotland – Albert Russell until June; then James Reid

=== Judiciary ===
- Lord President of the Court of Session and Lord Justice General – Lord Normand
- Lord Justice Clerk – Lord Aitchison
- Chairman of the Scottish Land Court – Lord MacGregor Mitchell

== Events ==
- 27–31 January – The Combined Scottish Universities by-election sees former UK Prime Minister Ramsay MacDonald returned to the House of Commons.
- March – Scottish Ornithologists' Club founded.
- 8 March – Comic strip characters The Broons and Oor Wullie first appear in The Sunday Post.
- 7 June – First outdoors radio broadcast in Gaelic, a religious service from Iona Abbey, transmitted by the BBC.
- 10 June – First timetabled service to Barra Airport, on Traigh Mhòr beach, offered by Northern & Scottish Airways.
- 23 September – Prince Albert and his wife, the Duchess of York, open a new wing of Aberdeen Royal Infirmary while his brother Edward VIII meets Wallis Simpson at Aberdeen railway station en route to Balmoral Castle
- 29 October – Kincardine Bridge opened across the Firth of Forth.
- November – Punjabi-born Dr. Jainti Dass Saggar becomes the first non-White local authority councillor in Scotland, being elected for the Scottish Labour Party in Dundee.
- 20 November – The Maybury roadhouse opens on the outskirts of Edinburgh, a notable example of Art Deco by Paterson & Broom.

== Births ==
- 7 January – Hunter Davies, writer
- 10 February
  - James Alexander Gordon, radio announcer (died 2014 in England)
  - Euan MacKie, archaeologist and anthropologist (died 2020)
- 11 February – Sylvia Wishart, landscape artist (died 2008)
- 4 March – Jim Clark, motor racing driver (killed 1968 in motor racing accident at Hockenheimring, Germany)
- 26 March – John Malcolm, film and television actor (died 2008)
- 17 April – Rona Lightfoot, bagpiper and singer
- 24 April – Davie Sneddon, footballer (died 2020)
- 26 April – Pat Quinn, footballer (died 2020)
- 28 April – Kenneth White, poet, academic and writer (died 2023)
- 5 May – John Maxton, politician
- 8 May – George Mulhall, footballer (died 2018 in England)
- 17 May – James Gordon, Baron Gordon of Strathblane, businessman and politician (died 2020)
- 27 May – Eric Anderson, born William Kinloch Anderson, educator, Provost of Eton College (died 2020)
- 10 June – Marion Chesney, novelist (died 2019)
- 25 June – Roy Williamson, folk musician (died 1990)
- 26 June – Robert Maclennan, Liberal Democrat politician (died 2020)
- 27 June – Robin Hall, folk singer (died 1998)
- 5 July – James Mirrlees, economist, winner of the 1996 Nobel Memorial Prize in Economic Sciences (died 2018 in England)
- 9 July – Richard Wilson, actor
- 18 September – Hugh Fraser, retailer (died 1987)
- 6 October – Sandra Voe, actress
- 21 November – James A. Mackay, writer and philatelist (died 2007)
- 25 November – William McIlvanney, novelist, short story writer and poet (died 2015)
- 1 December – Crawford Fairbrother, high jumper (died 1986)
- 2 December – Eileen McCallum actress
- 26 December – Tormod MacGill-Eain, Scottish Gaelic comedian, novelist, poet, musician and broadcaster (died 2017)
- Stewart Conn, poet and playwright
- Brian Quinn, economist and Chairman of Celtic F.C.

== Deaths ==
- 6 February – Charles Bellany Thomson, international footballer (born 1878)
- 23 February – William Adamson, trade unionist and politician, Leader of the Labour Party (1917–1921) and Secretary of State for Scotland in 1924 and 1929–1931 (born 1863)
- 2 March – Donald Alexander Mackenzie, journalist and folklorist (born 1873)
- 20 March – Cunninghame Graham, politician (first president of the Scottish National Party), adventurer and writer (born 1852; died in Argentina)
- 9 April – William Beardmore, 1st Baron Invernairn, industrialist (born 1856)
- 25 May – Sir Robert Sangster Rait, historian, Historiographer Royal (born 1874)
- 4 November – John Henry Lorimer portrait and genre painter (born 1856)
- 22 November – Sir Fitzroy Maclean, 10th Baronet, soldier and clan chief (born 1835)
- 2 December – Dugald Christie, missionary in China, founder of the Shengjing Clinic and Mukden Medical College (born 1885)
- Joseph Morris Henderson, Glaswegian landscape, portrait, genre and coastal scenery oil and watercolour painter (born 1863)

== The arts ==
- Edwin Muir publishes Scott and Scotland.

== See also ==
- Timeline of Scottish history
- 1936 in Northern Ireland
