= 1942 in Northern Ireland =

- Centuries: 20th; 21st
- Decades: 1920s; 1930s; 1940s; 1950s; 1960s
- See also: 1942 in the United Kingdom; 1942 in Ireland; Other events of 1942; List of years in Northern Ireland

Events during the year 1942 in Northern Ireland.

== Incumbents ==
- Governor - The Duke of Abercorn
- Prime Minister - J. M. Andrews

== Events ==
- 1 January – Clogher Valley Railway ceases operations and closes.
- 26 January – First United States troops for the European Theatre of World War II arrive in the United Kingdom at Belfast.

== Sport ==
=== Football ===
- Irish League

Winners: Belfast Celtic

- Irish Cup

Winners: Linfield 3 - 1 Glentoran

== Births ==
- 13 January – Arthur Stewart, footballer (died 2018).
- 19 February – Phil Coulter, musician and music producer.
- 12 March – Christina Reid, playwright (died 2015).
- 1 May – Eric Welsh, footballer.
- 8 May – Terry Neill, footballer and football manager.
- 2 June – Ken Robinson, Ulster Unionist Party MLA.
- 10 June – Gordon Burns, journalist and television presenter.
- 16 August – Frank McManus, solicitor and former Unity MP.
- 3 September – Paddy Kennedy, Republican Labour Party Councillor and MP (died 1999).
- 9 September – Kieran McCarthy, Alliance Party MLA.
- 14 September – Bernard MacLaverty, fiction writer.
- 16 November – Geoffrey Squires, poet.
- 3 December – Mike Gibson, rugby union international.

== Deaths ==
- 19 May – Sir Joseph Larmor, physicist (born 1857).

== See also ==
- 1942 in Scotland
- 1942 in Wales
