= 2021 in Scotland =

- Centuries: 19th; 20th; 21st
- Decades: 2000s; 2010s; 2020s
- See also: List of years in Scotland; Timeline of Scottish history 2021 in: The UK • England • Wales • Elsewhere; Scottish football: 2020–21 • 2021–22; 2021 in Scottish television

Events from the year 2021 in Scotland.

== Incumbents ==
- First Minister – Nicola Sturgeon
- Secretary of Scotland – Alister Jack

== Events ==
- 4 February – 2021 Kilmarnock incidents: a man stabs his ex-wife and stepdaughter to death and dies in a car crash.
- 6 May – Elections to the devolved Scottish parliament take place. Voter turnout is the highest in a Scottish Parliament election to date, at 63.0%. The Scottish Nationalist Party improves its performance, finishing with 64 seats, just short of an overall majority. The Conservatives finish with 31 seats, Labour 22, Scottish Greens 8 and Liberal Democrats 4.
- 13 May
  - 2021 Airdrie and Shotts by-election: Anum Qaisar retains the UK Parliamentary seat for the SNP.
  - Kenmure Street protests: protests occur after two Indian men living on Kenmure Street in Glasgow are taken from their home and detained by the Home Office in a van on the street for allegedly overstaying their visas. The men are released after 8 hours.
- 28 May – Murder of Esther Brown in her Glasgow flat.
- 1–12 November – The 26th session of the Conference of the Parties (COP26), a major United Nations climate summit, is held in Glasgow.
- 25-27 November – Storm Arwen causes widespread damage and power outages across Scotland.
- 28 November – Brechin Cathedral closes its doors for the final time as a sanctified church.

== Deaths ==
- 4 January – Kay Ullrich, politician, MSP 1999–2003 (born 1943)
- 12 January – Willie Miller, urban planner (born 1950)
- 14 January – Vincent Logan, Roman Catholic prelate, Bishop of Dunkeld 1981–2012 (born 1941; COVID-19).
- 14 February – Sir William Macpherson, High Court judge and clan chief (born 1926)
- 11 May – Neil Connery, retired actor and younger brother of actor Sean Connery (born 1938)
- 21 May – Ken MacKinnon, Scottish Gaelic sociolinguist (born 1933)
- 17 June – Andrew Welsh, Scottish politician (born 1944)
- 12 August – Una Stubbs, English actress (born 1937 in England)
- 23 August – Elizabeth Blackadder, painter and printmaker (born 1931)
- 23 August – Colin Bell, journalist, broadcaster and author (born 1938).
- 15 October – Robert Black, auditor (born 1946)
- 26 October – Walter Smith, Scottish association football player, manager and director (born 1948)
- 5 December – Gary Callander, Scottish international rugby union player (born 1959)

== See also ==
- 2021 in England
- 2021 in Northern Ireland
- 2021 in Wales
- Politics of Scotland
