= Stewart McLean (actor) =

Scottish actor (1941–2006)

William Stewart McLean (7 March 1941 in Scotland, UK – 6 August 2006 in Glasgow, Scotland, UK) was a Scottish actor, theatre administrator, and businessman.

In his early years, he worked as a businessman in the setting up and managing of photo processing firms across Scotland. After this, he pursued another passion of his by working with stars of pantomime, drama, and musicals in the south of England, eventually going professional in the theatre world at the age of 52 in 1993.

McLean worked with such UK stars as Allan Stewart, Andy Gray, Britt Ekland, Su Pollard, Gary Wilmot, Lesley Joseph, Dorothy Paul, and many others.

As an actor, he worked in the arenas of television, theatre, and pantomime. On the Scottish small screen, he had roles in "Taggart", "Monarch of the Glen", "Doctor Finlay", "River City", "Rab C. Nesbitt", and many others. In the theatre world, he worked on the UK tours of "High Society", "See How They Run", and "A Happy Medium". In pantomime, he worked in "Cinderella", "Dick Whittington", "Aladdin", and "Peter Pan".

He was also a tour and stage manager. He worked in most of Scotland's most notable theatres, including The King's Theatre in Edinburgh, where he managed the annual pantomime show; the Byre Theatre in St. Andrews; HM Theatre in Aberdeen; and the Adam Smith Theatre in Kirkcaldy.

Stewart McLean died on 6 August 2006 at his home in Glasgow's West End, a year after a heart bypass operation. He was divorced and survived by a son and daughter and two grandchildren.

== Selected TV Credits ==
Year	Title	Role	Production
1995	Jolly: A Life	Minister	BBC
1996	Doctor Finlay: Episode: All Jock Tamson's Bairns	Fraser Crichton	BBC
1999	High Road	Ken	STV
1999	Rab C. Nesbitt	Minister	BBC
2001	Monarch Of The Glen: Episode #2.4	Gordon	BBC
Other roles:	River City	unknown role	BBC
Other roles:	Taggart	unknown role	STV
Other roles:	Annie's Bar	unknown role	
Other roles:	F.O.T.	unknown role	BBC Scotland
Other roles:	Roughnecks	unknown role	

== Selected Stage Credits ==
Year	Title	Role	Production
1996	High Society	Seth	UK Tour
1998	See How They Run	Reverend Humphries	UK Tour
1999	My Fair Lady	Colonel Pickering	Perth Theatre (Scotland, UK)
1999	Cinderella	Lord Chamberlain	E & B Productions UK
2000	La Cage Aux Folles	Albin	The King's Theatre Glasgow (Scotland, UK)
2000	Mistress Of The Inn	Marquis of Forlipoppoli	Perth Theatre (Scotland, UK)
2002	Cat On A Hot Tin Roof	Reverend Tooker	The Byre Theatre (Scotland, UK)
2002	Parking Lott In Pittsburgh	Priest/ Dr. Collins/ Archie/ Dr. Stewart/ Andrew Gibbs	The Byre Theatre (Scotland, UK)
2004	A Happy Medium	Mr. Proudfoot	UK Tour

== Theatre Administration ==
As Company Manager, involved with such tours as:

- "See How They Run"
- "The Goodbye Girl"
- "Singular Woman"
- "Ken Hill's Phantom of the Opera"
- "Double Double"
- "The Dragon Variation"
- "Cinderella"
- "Peter Pan"
