= Frances M. Hendry =

British writer of children's historical fiction

Frances Mary Hendry (born 1941) is a British writer of children's historical fiction. Born and educated in Glasgow, Scotland, she now lives in Nairn, where many of her books are set.

Hendry was a teacher for 23 years and wrote plays and pantomimes for the Nairn Drama Club. She submitted a story to the first BBC "Quest for a Kelpie" writing competition and won first prize — her book took its name from the competition. She has had 16 books published, most of which are historical fiction for young adults. Two are fantasy; two are for younger readers. Several have won prizes and awards.
