= William Mustart Lockhart =

Scottish watercolour painter (1855–1941)

- Born: 26 January 1855
- Died: 3 January 1941 (aged 85)
- Education: Thomas Fairbairn
- Known for: Topographical watercolours
- Spouses: Marjory Stewart (m. 1879, died); Marion Smith Jackson (m. 1894)

William Mustart Lockhart (26 January 1855 – 3 January 1941) was a Scottish watercolour painter, born in Perth and later resident in Glasgow. His middle name, taken from his mother's maiden name, is occasionally noted as Mustard.

== Life ==
William was born in Perth prison to his mother Margaret Mustart. His father David Lockhart of Blackford, Perthshire, was a prison warder at Perth prison. William had one sister, Morria, ten years his junior. They grew up at 23 Castle Gable, Perth.

When William was old enough he took on an apprenticeship to be an upholsterer, as noted on the 1871 census. He moved to Glasgow and then stayed at 85 Cambridge Street. In Glasgow, he became a student of the artist Thomas Fairbairn, a noted painter of West of Scotland locales.

On 18 June 1879, Lockhart married Marjory Stewart (a Perth girl from 17 North Methven St) in Perth Free Church. His trade is marked as an upholsterer on the marriage certificate. At the time of the 1881 census, he was living at 23 Rosehall Street, Milton, in Glasgow.

His wife Marjory later died, leaving one daughter, Catherine. Lockhart's mother, Margaret, was present in the household by the census of 1891.

William was to marry again on 1 June 1894, this time to Marion Smith Jackson. By this point William was trading as an artist and upholster at 151 Sword Street in Glasgow's east end. Marion's father, John Jackson, was a joiner, and Lockhart's business soon expanded to include picture restoration and furniture making.

== Art ==
After studying with Thomas Fairbairn, Lockhart became known for his topographical work around Glasgow, particularly in the Bridgeton area of Glasgow's East End. His painting career is noted as being prevalent from 1870 to 1912. Many of his paintings are now found in Glasgow and other West of Scotland museums.

== Later life ==
Lockhart had another two sons and a daughter with Marion. Still in Glasgow's East End, he stayed at 129 Coventry Drive in Dennistoun.

He was diagnosed with bronchitic asthma, but shortly afterwards died of a pulmonary oedema on 3 January 1941.
