= Peter Kerr (author) =

Peter Kerr is an author of travel books and fiction. He re-located from Scotland to Mallorca in the 1980s and began his writing career while working as a farmer.

== Writing ==
Kerr's books Snowball Oranges, Mañana Mañana, Viva Mallorca! and A Basketful of Snowflakes, his Mallorcan-based travel books, have been translated into fourteen languages.

Thistle Soup, a prequel to Snowball Oranges, was published in 2002 and is an account of his life from boyhood in East Lothian. A new edition was released in 2017. From Paella to Porridge, tells of the Kerr family's final year in Mallorca and their return to East Lothian.

His first fiction book, a mystery called Bob Burns Investigates – The Mallorca Connection, was also released in 2006, and followed by Bob Burns Investigates – The Sporran Connection . Fiddler On the Make, a quirky town-meets-country caper, was published later the same year, with The Cruise Connection, the third in the Bob Burns trilogy, and The Gannet Has Landed, a romantic adventure set in Mallorca, both released in 2008.

His first historical novel, Song of the Eight Winds, set in 13th century Mallorca, was published in 2012. Don’t Call Me Clyde!, a memoir of his life as a young jazz musician in early-Sixties London, was completed in 2016. In May 2020 he released Goblin Hall his first fantasy title.

In 2021, he published Jen, the story of a Border Collie.

== Awards ==
In 2002, Snowball Oranges won the bronze prize in American Book of the Year, while Manana Manana was shortlisted for the WH Smith British Book of the Year.

== Music ==
Prior to taking over the family farm Peter was a musician. His musical career is rooted in jazz and he was the clarinettist-leader of Scotland's premiere jazz band The Clyde Valley Stompers in the 1960s. Recording for Beatles producer George Martin, The Stompers stormed the charts in 1962 with Prokofiev's Peter and the Wolf.
