= Charles Corry =

Irish cricketer (born 1940)

Cricket information
- Batting: Right-handed

International information
- National side: Ireland

Career statistics
Competition	First-class
Matches	4
Runs scored	40
Batting average	6.66
100s/50s	0/0
Top score	17
Catches/stumpings	2/–
- Source: CricketArchive, 6 December 2022

Charles Victor Corry (born 26 November 1940) is a former Irish cricketer. A right-handed batsman, he made his debut for the Ireland cricket team against Scotland in June 1959, and played for them five times in all, his last match also coming against Scotland in July 1966. Four of his matches for Ireland had first-class status.
