= James A. Sharkey =

Irish historian and former diplomat

James Anthony Sharkey (born 1945, Derry, Northern Ireland) is an Irish historian and former diplomat.

He was born and educated in Derry and worked as a teacher in Stepney, Derry and Dublin.

Sharkey holds degrees in Russian and Russian history from University College Dublin and Birmingham University. He is the author of works about folk history in Inishowen, Scots Gaelic, the Russian peasantry and Lafcadio Hearn.

In 1970 he joined the Irish diplomatic service. He served as Irish ambassador to a number of countries. The following list may be incomplete

- 1987–1989 Ambassador to Australia
- 1989-1995 Ambassador to Japan
- 1997–2001 Ambassador to Denmark with concurrent accreditation to Iceland and Norway
- 2001–2003 Ambassador to Russia with concurrent accreditation to Armenia, Belarus, Georgia, Kazakhstan, Kyrgyzstan, Tajikistan, and Uzbekistan
- 2007–2009 Ambassador to Switzerland with concurrent accreditation to Liechtenstein and Algeria

As Permanent Representative to the Council of Europe, Strasbourg, he chaired the Human Rights Committee and defended the leading role of the European Court of Human Rights.
