= 2022 in Scotland =

- Centuries: 19th; 20th; 21st
- Decades: 2000s; 2010s; 2020s
- See also: List of years in Scotland; Timeline of Scottish history 2022 in: The UK • England • Wales • Elsewhere; Scottish football: 2021–22 • 2022–23; 2022 in Scottish television

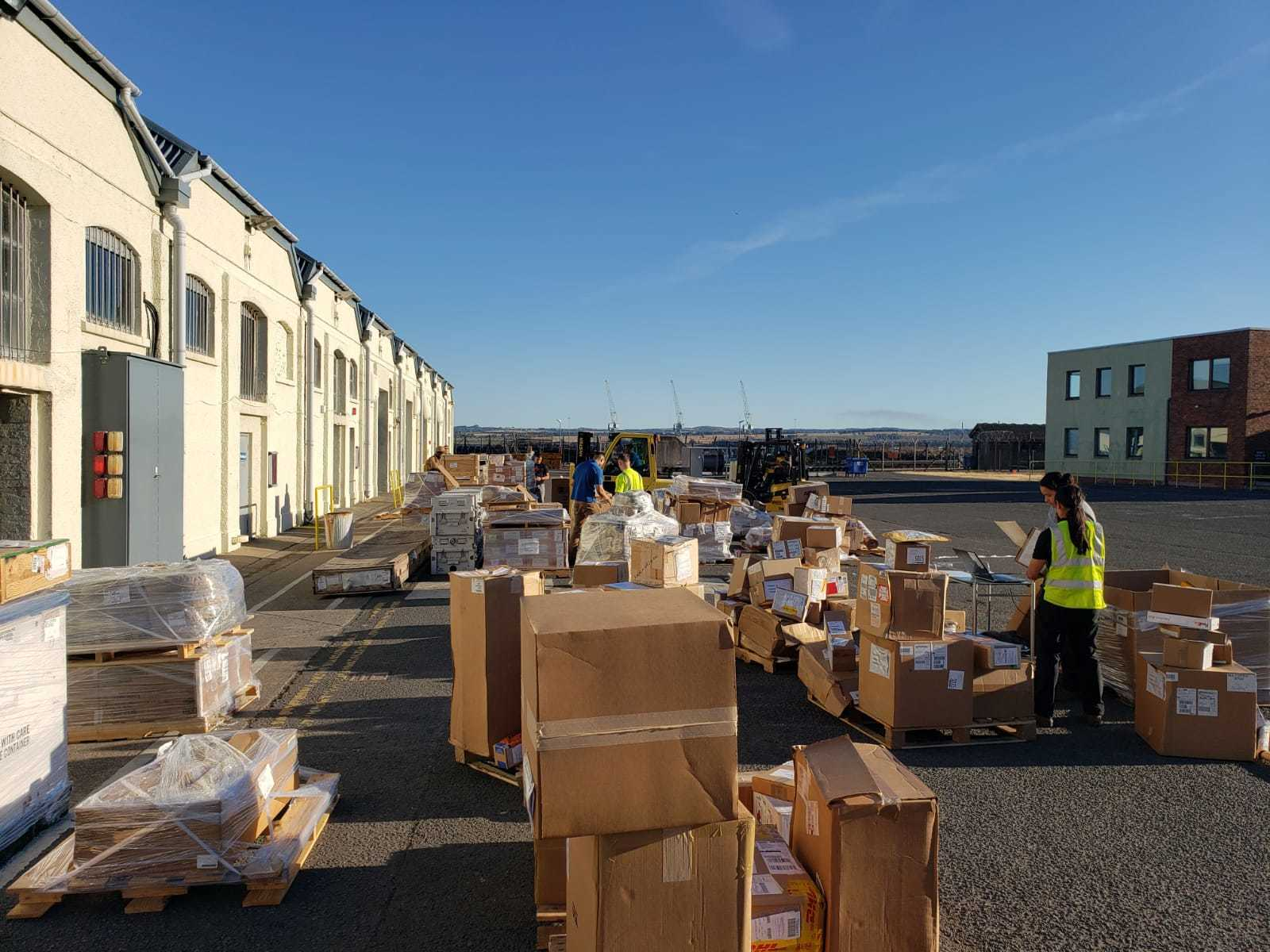
U.S. Marines assigned to the 22nd Marine Expeditionary Unit process and load mission-related cargo during USNS William McLean's port visit August 11, 2022 at Defense Munitions Crombie, Scotland, United Kingdom.

Events from the year 2022 in Scotland.

== Incumbents ==
- First Minister – Nicola Sturgeon
- Secretary of State – Alister Jack

== Events ==
- 20 March – 2022 Census for Scotland. The Scottish census was postponed by one year than the national census in the rest of the UK undertaken in 2021.
- 5 May – 2022 Scottish local elections.
- May – Announcement that Dunfermline, Fife is one of eight places to be awarded city status in the United Kingdom as part of this year's celebrations for the Platinum Jubilee of Queen Elizabeth II.
- 14 June – Nicola Sturgeon then-First Minister, launches the first of a series of papers setting out the case for a proposed second Scottish independence referendum, which she was in favour of.
- 10–14 July – One-hundred and fiftieth Open Championship at the Old Course at St Andrews.
- 19 July – Warmest ever temperature in Scotland recorded, 35.1 °C (95.1 °F) at Floors Castle in the Borders.
- 15 August – Scotland becomes the first country in the world to make free sanitary products available to women after legislation passed by the Scottish Parliament comes into force in a bid to tackle period poverty.
- 22 August – Seagreen offshore wind farm, off the Angus coast, begins generating.
- August–September – 2022 Scotland bin strikes.
- 8 September – Queen Elizabeth II dies at Balmoral Castle.
- 13 September – Margaret Ferrier, then-MP for Rutherglen and Hamilton West who travelled by train from London to Scotland after receiving a positive COVID test in September 2020, is given 270 hours of community service after previously pleading guilty at Glasgow Sheriff Court to culpably and recklessly exposing the public to the virus.
- 22 September – Aberdeen's last paper mill, Stoneywood, enters administration, having operated on the site for 252 years.
- 23 November – The Supreme Court rules that the devolved Scottish Government cannot hold a second Scottish independence referendum without the UK Government's consent.
- 22 December – MSPs vote to approve the Gender Recognition Reform (Scotland) Bill by 86 votes to 39.

== Deaths ==
- 9 February – Fiona Denison, doctor and academic
- 2 March – John Stahl, actor (born 1953)
- 13 March – Mary Lee, singer (born 1921)
- 24 March – John McLeod, composer (born 1934)
- 13 May – Angus Grossart, merchant banker and newspaper executive (born 1937)
- 12 July – Joan Lingard, writer (born 1932)
- 11 August – Darius Campbell Danesh, singer and reality star (born 1980)
- 14 October – Robbie Coltrane, actor and comedian (born 1950)
- 26 November – Doddie Weir, rugby union player and motor neuron disease campaigner (born 1970)

== See also ==
- 2022 in Northern Ireland
- 2022 in Wales
- 2022 in the United Kingdom
- Politics of Scotland
