= 2025 in Scotland =

- Centuries: 19th; 20th; 21st
- Decades: 2000s; 2010s; 2020s
- See also: List of years in Scotland; Timeline of Scottish history 2025 in: The UK • England • Wales • Elsewhere; Scottish football: 2024–25 • 2025–26; 2025 in Scottish television

Events from the year 2025 in Scotland.

== Incumbents ==
- First Minister – John Swinney
- Secretary of State
  - Ian Murray (until 5 September)
  - Douglas Alexander (after 5 September)

== Events ==
=== January ===
- 1 January –
  - Ferry fares in Scotland increase by 10%.
  - Police Scotland release images of 19 people they wish to speak to in connection with violence and disorder which broke out in Glasgow city centre ahead of the Scottish League Cup final between Celtic and Rangers at Hampden Park on 15 December.
  - Traditional Scottish singer Iona Fyfe takes up the post of Rector of the University of Aberdeen, succeeding Martina Chukwuma–Ezike.
  - With temperatures set to drop overnight on 1–2 January, the Met Office issues a yellow weather warning for ice covering all of Scotland.
- 3 January – Public Health Scotland data released for the week ending 29 December shows the number of hospital admissions for flu has increased by 12% in a week, with influenza present in 52.6 per 100,000 people.
- 6 January – A 2.9 magnitude earthquake is recorded in Kinloch, 19 miles north west of Oban.
- 7 January – A fresh yellow weather alert for snow and ice is issued for large parts of Scotland, starting from midday and lasting for 24 hours.
- 8 January –
  - Police Scotland launch an investigation into the illegal release of two lynx in the Highlands, and warn the public not to approach them.
  - BBC News reports that plans are under way to create the UK's largest battery storage facility in Coalburn, South Lanarkshire.
  - Details of Edinburgh's proposed tourist tax are unveiled, with the levy set at 5%.
  - Patrick Harvie, the co-leader of the Scottish Greens, is to take time off from the Scottish Parliament because of a medical procedure.
- 9 January –
  - Following a trial at the High Court of Justiciary in Glasgow, the members of a Romanian grooming gang, consisting of four men and one woman, are convicted of the rape of ten women between 2021 and 2022.
  - Former First Minister Humza Yousaf accuses Twitter owner Elon Musk of trying to inflame racial tensions after he posted about the murder of a Glasgow schoolboy.
  - A pair of lynx released illegally are recaptured in the Cairngorms National Park. A second pair are found in the same area the following day.
- 10 January – The UK records its coldest temperatures of the winter so far, with an overnight low of −14.5 °C (5.9 °F) in Altnaharra, northern Scotland.
- 11 January –
  - The Royal Zoological Society of Scotland confirms that a lynx captured in the Cairngorms National Park the previous day has died overnight.
  - Temperatures continue to fall, becoming the coldest since 2010, with an overnight low of −18.9 °C in Roybridge, Scotland.
  - Disappearance of Eliza and Henrietta Huszti: The search for twin sisters missing from Aberdeen since the early hours of 7 January is extended to the coast.
- 12 January – Police focus their search for missing sisters Eliza and Henrietta Huszti on the River Dee.
- 13 January –
  - In a social media post, former First Minister Nicola Sturgeon announces that she and Peter Murrell, the former SNP chief executive, have "decided to end" their marriage and have been separated for some time.
  - Caledonian MacBrayne ferry MV Glen Sannox begins timetabled sailings on the Arran route.
  - The Royal Zoological Society of Scotland says that four lynx illegally released in the Cairngorms National Park showed signs of starvation.
  - Shell plc says it is investigating a "suspected unexploded ordnance" near the Far North Liquids and Associated Gas System (FLAGS) pipeline in the North Sea off Shetland.
  - The Thistle, the UK's first drugs consumption clinic, opens in Glasgow. It is used more than 130 times in its first week.
- 20 January – The bodies of a 36-year-old man and a six-year-old girl, later identified as Mark Gordon and his daughter Hope, are discovered at a house in West Lothian.
- 21 January – Perthshire teenager James Maris, who attempted to construct a semi-automatic rifle using a 3D printer he received for Christmas, is sentenced to 300 hours community service, along with a three-year supervision order and a twelve-month night time curfew.
- 22 January –
  - The Scottish Government scraps its flagship policy of launching a National Care Service, although the Social Care Minister confirms that a proposed National Care Service Bill will still be presented to Parliament.
  - MSPs pass the Welfare of Dogs Bill, requiring a code of practice for getting a dog to be drawn up in the next twelve months.
- 23 January –
  - The Scottish Government Resilience Room (SGoRR) is activated by first minister John Swinney ahead of Storm Éowyn.
  - The Met office amber warning for wind is upgraded to a Red Warning in the Central belt and Northern Ireland
  - The Scottish Government issues an emergency alert to mobile phones across Scotland ahead of Storm Éowyn. The alert was received by approximately 4.5 million people across Scotland.
- 24 January – Storm Éowyn makes landfall in Scotland, causing significant damage and disruption to public services including transport networks and schools. Wind speeds as high as 102 mph are recorded on the Tay Road Bridge, and approximately 117,000 homes across the country are left without power.
- 25 January –
  - The railway line between East Kilbride and Glasgow Central closes for 16 weeks for electrification work to be carried out. It is scheduled to reopen on 18 May.
  - A 19-year-old man from East Ayrshire, Calum Carmichael, dies from complications following a tree falling onto his car during Storm Éowyn on 23 January.
- 26 January – More than 14,000 homes across Scotland are still without electricity and power following Storm Éowyn.
- 27 January –
  - A notorious Glasgow paedophile gang of five men and two women are sentenced to lifelong terms in prison and warned they may never be released on parole.
  - Police Scotland say they have completed a search of the River Dee in Aberdeen and that inquiries are ongoing on the investigation into the disappearance of two sisters.
- 28 January – Joe Fitzpatrick announces that he will not stand for re-election to the Scottish Parliament seat of Dundee City West at the 2026 Scottish Parliament election.
- 29 January – The Scottish Government announces the early release of around 390 prisoners beginning in February as the latest measure to reduce the prison population.
- 30 January – The Court of Sessions in Edinburgh rules that licences for the Rosebank and Jackdaw oil fields were granted illegally, and that their owners must seek fresh approval from the UK government.
- 31 January –
  - Police in Aberdeen searching for two missing sisters announce the discovery of the bodies of two unidentified women near to where they were last seen.
  - Transport for Scotland announces a 3.8% increase for train fares from April.

=== February ===
- 1 February – Police confirm that a second woman's body has been discovered close to where two sisters disappeared in Aberdeen.
- 3 February –
  - Nurse Sandie Peggie starts to give evidence at an employment tribunal into her claims that being forced to change in the same changing room as a doctor who was born male but self-identified as female amounted to harassment under the Equality Act.
  - First Minister John Swinney says there will be no ban on cats in Scotland after the Scottish Animal Welfare Commission suggested restricting them in some areas because of a potential "significant risk to wildlife populations".
- 4 February –
  - Teachers in Glasgow belonging to the Educational Institute of Scotland vote to strike over planned cuts to education funding.
  - Aberdeen councillor Kairin van Sweeden of the SNP is cleared by the Ethical Standards Commissioner of breaching the code of conduct after describing Labour's Deena Tissera as a "new Scot" during an Aberdeen City Council meeting in 2023.
- 6 February –
  - BBC News reports the case of a woman from the Highlands who, after being assaulted by her husband, was unable to find a divorce lawyer to represent her through legal aid despite approaching 116 different law firms.
  - Nickolas Chenier becomes the first person to be convicted under the Hunting With Dogs (Scotland) Act after pleading guilty at Wick Sheriff Court. He is fined £750 and banned from keeping a dog for five years after the animal attacked a deer while he was using it for illegal hare coursing.
  - Chris McEleny is suspended as general secretary of the Alba Party following allegations of gross misconduct.
- 7 February –
  - First Minister John Swinney rules out the legal reintroduction of lynx into the wild in Scotland.
  - Teachers in Glasgow schedule a strike for Thursday 20 February. The strike is subsequently called off after Glasgow City Council agrees to drop its plans to go ahead with job cuts.
  - Deaf teenager Niamdh Braid wins a legal case against Fife Council to have a British Sign Language interpreter in her class for school lessons.
- 11 February – Police confirm that two bodies found in a river in Aberdeen are those of missing twin sisters Henrietta and Eliza Huszti.
- 13 February –
  - The Church of Scotland (Lord High Commissioner) Bill is introduced into the House of Commons in order to lift the ban on Roman Catholics becoming the King's representative at the Church of Scotland's annual assembly, after Lady Elish Angiolini KC, a practising Catholic, was appointed to be Lord High Commissioner of the 2025 general assembly.
  - Historic Environment Scotland grants Glasgow Central Mosque Category A listed status.
  - Three 20-storey tower blocks in Motherwell are to be destroyed in a controlled explosion later in the year to make way for new development.
  - Nigg, a port owned by Global Energy Group, and part of the new Inverness and Cromarty Firth Green Freeport, is given permission by the UK government to have some of its own customs arrangements.
- 14 February – In a speech at the Munich Security Conference, US Vice President J D Vance criticises Scotland's Safe Access Zones Act, which provides buffer zones around abortion clinics, claiming people who live within safe access zones have been sent letters by the Scottish Government warning them about praying within their homes. In response, the Scottish Government accuses Vance of "spreading misinformation" and says that no such letters have been sent out, while the Act would only cover "intentional or reckless behaviour". Green MSP Gillian Mackay, who drew up the legislation, describes the Vice President's comments as "shocking and shameless misinformation".
- 16 February – The Crown Office takes over the management of post mortem examinations in Aberdeen due to a shortage of qualified personnel in the city.
- 17 February – BBC Radio Scotland presenter Janice Forsyth announces she is stepping down from presenting after being diagnosed with early onset Alzheimer's disease.
- 18 February –
  - Scotland begins the early release of a further 390 prisoners in an attempt to reduce overcrowding in the country's prisons.
  - East Lothian Council becomes the first Scottish council to confirm a double-digit council tax increase, after announcing it will rise by 10% from April.
- 19 February – A 74-year-old woman becomes the first person to be arrested and charged under a Scottish law banning protests outside abortion clinics following an incident at Glasgow's Queen Elizabeth University Hospital.
- 20 February – Five local authorities in Scotland confirm the largest council tax increases in two decades; they are North Lanarkshire and Scottish Borders (10%), Fife (8.2%), Edinburgh (8%) and Glasgow (7.5%).
- 21 February –
  - The West Coast Main Line is closed between Carstairs and Lockerbie following a landslip at Beattock.
  - A 17-year-old boy who idolised the teenagers who carried out the Columbine High School massacre and planned to replicate it at his school in Edinburgh pleads guilty to an offence under the Terrorism Act.
  - Scottish Labour leader Anas Sarwar says he will deliver the "biggest reform of the NHS in decades" if his party wins the 2026 Scottish Parliament election.
- 22 February –
  - Scotland's first slap fight contest, scheduled to take place at Glasgow University Union, is cancelled following a health warning from a leading brain injury expert.
  - A 40-year-old man dies after he is hit by an ambulance responding to an emergency call on the outskirts of Elgin in the early hours of the morning.
- 23 February – Prime Minister Sir Keir Starmer announces a further £200m investment in the Grangemouth Refinery site, which is scheduled to close later in the year, with the money aimed at repurposing the site for other industrial use.
- 24 February –
  - BBC News Scotland reports the official cause of death of twin sisters Henrietta and Eliza Huszti, whose bodies were found in the River Dee, as drowning.
  - The body of Scottish businessman Campbell Scott, who disappeared while on a business trip to Kenya on 16 February, is found dumped in a sack. A murder investigation is launched by the country's police.
- 26 February –
  - Kevin Booth, a man who tortured vulnerable women in an underground dungeon at his home in the Highlands, becomes the first person to be given a worldwide travel ban by a court in Scotland.
  - A wall collapses following an explosion at an electricity sub-station in Dundee city centre.
- 28 February –
  - Around 70 passengers and crew are rescued from a train near the Tay Bridge in Dundee following a fire in a power car.
  - Lord Advocate Dorothy Bain KC orders a fresh investigation into the death of Demi Hannaway, a woman who was abused by her partner, and who died in May 2021.

=== March ===
- 3 March – SNP MSP and deputy presiding officer Annabelle Ewing announces she will not seek re-election to Holyrood in 2026.
- 4 March –
  - Former Scottish Labour leader Richard Leonard announces he will not seek re-election to the Scottish Parliament at the next election.
  - Scottish Sikh Jagtar Singh Johal, detained in India since 2017 on terror charges, is cleared in one of nine cases against him.
- 5 March – SNP ministers Shona Robison and Fiona Hyslop announce they will stand down from Holyrood at the next Scottish election.
- 6 March – Falkirk Council sets Scotland's largest council tax increase after councillors agree a 15.6% rise.
- 8 March – The activist group Palestine Action have vandalised parts of Donald Trump's Turnberry Golf Resort and posted pictures on social media.
- 9 March – Following an unseasonably warm weekend, the highest temperature of the year so far is recorded at Threave in Western Scotland, with a high of 17.3 °C.
- 10 March – Carol Beattie is appointed chief executive of the Scottish National Party after taking on the post in an acting role following the resignation of her predecessor, Murray Foote.
- 11 March –
  - The University of Dundee announces plans to cut 632 jobs in an attempt to address a £35m deficit.
  - The Scottish Government announces it is scrapping plans to require homeowners to switch to greener heating shortly after purchase, and will take the measures out of its Heat in Buildings Bill.
- 12 March – Former First Minister Nicola Sturgeon announces she will stand down from the Scottish Parliament at the 2026 election.
- 13 March – First Minister John Swinney holds talks with Eric Trump, the son of US President Donald Trump, at Bute House.
- 14 March – Arran ferry MV Glen Sannox is taken out of service after the discovery of a crack in its hull.
- 16 March – The MV Glen Sannox resumes sailing following repairs to its hull.
- 17 March – Following a trial at Glasgow Court of Justiciary, Dionne Christie is convicted of the murder of her drug dealer boyfriend, Jevin Haig, who she stabbed with a hunting knife at their flat in June 2022.
- 18 March –
  - A fatal accident inquiry into the deaths of three newborn babies at two hospitals in Lanarkshire concludes that "reasonable precautions" could have prevented the deaths.
  - BBC Scotland announces its flagship soap, River City, will end in Autumn 2026 after 24 years on air.
- 19 March –
  - During a hearing at Stirling Sheriff Court, 26-year-old Shaazia Arshad pleads guilty to the assault of a one-month-old baby boy, who suffered injuries that have been compared to those that would be sustained in a car crash. She will be sentenced on 16 April.
  - It is announced that the UK is to host the opening stage of the 2027 Tour de France for both the men's and women's races, with the men's race starting in Edinburgh.
- 20 March – Former SNP chief executive Peter Murrell appears before Edinburgh Sheriff Court charged with embezzlement, while his estranged wife, former Nicola Sturgeon, is told she will face no further action in the police investigation into SNP finances.
- 21 March – SNP MSP Fergus Ewing announces he will not stand for the party at the 2026 Holyrood election, but may run as an independent.
- 22 March – Flights between London Heathrow Airport and airports in Scotland resume after Heathrow was closed the previous day following a fire at an electricity substation supplying power to the airport.
- 23 March – Three 26-storey tower blocks in Wyndford, Glasgow, are demolished in a controlled explosion to make way for the area's redevelopment.
- 25 March – Douglas Ross, the former leader of the Scottish Conservatives, announces he is standing down from Holyrood at the 2026 election.
- 26 March – The Alba Party leadership election is held, with Kenny MacAskill elected to succeed Alex Salmond as party leader following his death in October 2024.
- 29 March – Part of the M8 motorway in Renfrewshire is closed for several hours following a bus crash near Bishopton.
- 31 March –
  - Elizabeth Ann Sweeney is sentenced to life imprisonment with a minimum term of 18 years for the June 2023 murder of Neil Jolly, who she beat to death with a kettle at a block of high rise flats in Aberdeen.
  - An ocean-going submarine being tested in Loch Ness has found an underwater camera set up on 1970 in an attempt to photograph the Loch Ness Monster. The camera has no images of the creature, but one of the submarine's engineers was able to develop a few images of the loch.

=== April ===
- 1 April –
  - Six men are taken to hospital following a large fire on the Blairlinn Industrial Estate in Cumbernauld.
  - Stephen Flynn, the Scottish National Party's leader at Westminster, confirms his intention to stand for the party in the 2026 Holyrood election.
- 2 April – Patrick Harvie announces he is standing down as co-leader of the Scottish Greens, but will stay on until an election is held in the summer.
- 4 April –
  - Jamie Greene, an MSP who left the Scottish Conservatives the previous day, joins the Scottish Liberal Democrats, blaming his decision to leave the Conservative on them becoming "Trump-esque in both style and substance" in an attempt to win the support of right-wing voters. He subsequently says there is "growing disquiet" among former colleagues about the party's direction.
  - Malcolm McNee, described as an associate of the Glasgow-based Daniel organised crime gang, is sentenced to life imprisonment with a minimum of 22 years for the August 2021 murder of John Quinn McGregor, who was shot in the chest following a chase.
- 6 April – A number of properties are evacuated in the Dumfries and Galloway area as firefighters continue to battle a wildfire that broke out two days earlier.
- 8 April –
  - Nurses, midwifery and healthcare staff are offered an 8% pay rise over two years by NHS Scotland.
  - The Scottish Government is to provide NHS Grampian a loan of £67m to help it deal with a financial shortfall due to overspending.
- 9 April – The death occurs of John Hanson, 84, who was on remand at HMP Edinburgh awaiting trial accused of causing the death of his wife, Margaret, at their home in Galashiels in December 2024.
- 10 April – Scotland experiences its hottest day of the year so far, with temperatures reaching 22.7 °C at Aboyne in Aberdeenshire.
- 11 April –
  - Work begins on demolishing the derelict Clune Park Estate in Port Glasgow, a housing estate known as Scotland's Chernobyl because of its ghost town-like appearance.
  - The Scottish Fire and Rescue Service urges the public to "act responsibly" as an extreme wildfire warning remains in place across the country.
  - Four members of a gang who attacked an off-duty police officer at Blantyre railway station in March 2024, leaving him with lifechanging injuries, are sent to prison. Robert Faulds and Lauren Neary receive eight and six years respectively after pleading guilty to attempted murder, while Alec Fallon and an unnamed 16-year-old boy receive four years and thirty months respectively after admitting assault.
- 12 April –
  - Lomond School in Helensburgh, Argyll and Bute, announces it is to start accepting fee payments using Bitcoin.
  - Captain Cody wins the Scottish Grand National at Ayr Racecourse, but the race is overshadowed by the deaths of two horses.
  - Three teenagers are injured following a stabbing incident near Portobello Beach in Edinburgh.
- 14 April – The Scottish Government partially lifts a voluntary pay freeze after 16 years, meaning ministers will receive a £19,000 annual pay rise. Junior ministers will receive a salary of £100,575, while cabinet secretaries will receive £116,125.
- 16 April –
  - In a defeat for the Scottish Government, the Supreme Court rules that the legal definition of a woman is based on biological sex and that only biological and not trans women meet the definition of a woman under equality laws.
  - Shaazia Arshad, who shook a one-month-old baby boy so violently that he suffered "car crash like" injuries, is sentenced to three years in prison.
- 17 April – Bailey Dowling is found guilty of the February 2023 murder of Lewis McCartney, a teenager who was stabbed during a night out in Edinburgh.
- 18 April – Russell Findlay, leader of the Scottish Conservatives, says he will not attend a forthcoming anti-far-right summit being chaired by First Minister John Swinney, claiming the event is "not required" and is being used to "deflect from the SNP's dismal record".
- 22 April –
  - The Scottish Government says it has no plans to bring back the Gender Recognition Reform (Scotland) Bill following the Supreme Court ruling on what defines a woman.
  - The Dean of the Faculty of Advocates criticises Scottish Green MSP Maggie Chapman for her comments about "bigotry, prejudice and hatred coming from the Supreme Court", following its judgement on the definition of a woman.
  - Former nurse Adele Rennie, who was sentenced to prison in 2024 after posing as a man on dating app Tinder to target women, is returned to custody after contacting one of her victims within days of her release.
- 23 April –
  - The Scottish Government drops a key climate commitment to reduce car usage by 20% by the end of the decade.
  - Dorothy Bain KC, the Lord Advocate, launches a prosecution against Sodexo Ltd, operators of HM Prison Addiewell and NHS Lothian over the treatment of Calum Inglis, a prisoner who died in custody 12 days after contracting COVID-19 in October 2021.
  - Following a legal case brought against Scottish Borders Council by parents of children at Earlston Primary School, which had installed gender neutral toilets, schools in Scotland have been ordered to provide single sex toilets.
- 24 April –
  - It is announced that First Minister John Swinney will attend the funeral of Pope Francis in Rome on 26 April.
  - Stars of Scottish soap River City stage a protest against its cancellation outside the Scottish Parliament.
- 26 April – First Minister John Swinney is among international dignitaries to attend the funeral of Pope Francis in Rome.
- 27 April –
  - Eilish McColgan sets a new Scottish marathon record after completing the 2025 London Marathon in two hours 24 minutes and 25 seconds.
  - A cyclist taking part in the Loch Ness Etape dies after being involved in a crash near Inverness.
- 28 April –
  - First Minister John Swinney joins calls for rap group Kneecap to be dropped from the 2025 TRNSMT festival following the emergence of footage in which one of their members appeared to suggest the killing of Conservative MPs.
  - Martin Dowey temporarily stands down as leader of South Ayrshire Council over a secret recording in which he appears to suggest he can help award contracts to "pals".
  - Data published by the Scottish Centre for Crime and Justice Research indicates a 60% increase in deaths in Scottish prisons in 2024, with 64 deaths that year, compared to 40 in 2023.
  - BT launches a consultation process on the potential removal of 110 public payphones from the Highlands region.
  - The Unite union threatens legal action against Stagecoach Group after the bus company cancels drivers' holiday dates during planned strikes.
- 29 April –
  - The Scottish Football Association updates its gender policy to ban transgender women from playing in women's football teams.
  - Scottish Greens MSP Maggie Chapman survives an attempt to remove her from the Scottish Parliament's equalities committee following her criticism of the judiciary over the Supreme Court's ruling on biological sex.
- 30 April –
  - Scotland records its warmest temperature of the year so far, with 24.4 °C recorded at Aboyne, Aberdeenshire.
  - Washe Manyatelo, who in August 2023 struck and killed a pedestrian with his car while inhaling laughing gas, is sentenced to five years in prison.

=== May ===
- 1 May – Stella Maris, the rector of St Andrews University, wins an appeal after being removed from her role on the university court over comments she made about the Israel-Gaza war.
- 3 May – A 67-year-old woman is killed and two teenagers seriously hurt in a crash in Dumfries and Galloway.
- 6 May – First Minister John Swinney announces that peak rail fares in Scotland will be scrapped from September.
- 7 May – During a hearing at the High Court in Glasgow, Dionne Christie is sentenced to eight and a half years in prison after she was previously found guilty of culpable homicide over the death of her boyfriend, Jevin Haig, who she stabbed with a knife he carried after being provoked.
- 8 May –
  - First Minister John Swinney says he will not support assisted dying in Scotland.
  - The pilot of a light aircraft is killed and his passenger critically injured after the plane crashes at an airfield in East Lothian.
  - A 14-year-old boy is sentenced to five years in prison after pleading guilty to the culpable homicide of Kory McCrimmon, a member of a rival gang who was stabbed in May 2023 during a disagreement over £50.
- 9 April –
  - A cyberattack on Edinburgh City Council's education department leaves school students without access to revision material ahead of exams.
  - It is announced that transgender women will no longer be able to use the women's toilets in the Scottish Parliament building.
- 10 May –
  - A wildfire breaks out in Fauldhouse, West Lothian.
  - A motorcyclist is killed following a crash with a lorry in Moray.
- 12 May – The Scottish Secondary Teachers' Association calls on the Scottish Government to urgently publish new guidance on how schools should deal with single-sex spaces.
- 13 May –
  - MSPs vote 70–56 in an initial vote to accept the principles of the Assisted Dying for Terminally Ill Adults (Scotland) Bill, which would allow assisted dying in Scotland.
  - Scotland experiences its hottest day of the year as temperatures reach 25.5 °C in Auchincruvie, South Ayrshire, and Tyndrum, Stirlingshire.
- 14 May –
  - Care staff at Enable Scotland and belonging to the Unison trade union are to hold a strike beginning on 29 May, the first such strike by care staff in Scotland for a decade.
  - More than half of Scotland's rivers are placed under a low level alert following a spell of dry weather.
- 16 May –
  - Jonathan Divers, or Peterhead, pleads guilty to culpable homicide after stabbing his mother, Elizabeth Watson, to death in a frenzied attack in June 2023. The High Court in Glasgow accepted the plea on the grounds of diminished responsibility.
  - Aberdeen grandmother Coleen Muirhead, who stole more than £1.5m from her employers and was sentenced to three years and four months in prison in 2023, is ordered to repay £670,00 by the High Court in Glasgow.
- 18 May –
  - Former Conservative cabinet minister Michael Gove tells BBC Scotland's The Sunday Show that he does not believe a second Scottish independence referendum is necessary, but that it could happen if there was "overwhelming support" for one.
  - The line between East Kilbride and Glasgow Central re-opens after being closed for four months for engineering work to electrify the track.
  - Police Scotland confirm that a 16-year-old boy, later named as Kayden Moy, has died following a disturbance at Irvine Beach, North Ayrshire, the previous day. A 17-year-old boy is subsequently charged with murder.
- 20 May – The Royal Zoological Society of Scotland announces that the UK's oldest polar bear, 28-year-old Victoria, has been euthanised because of deteriorating health.
- 21 May –
  - Arslan Sajid, Andrew Gregoire and Anthony Davidson – three members of a drugs gang – are each sentenced to 11 years in prison after being found guilty of the culpable homicide of Amy-Rose Wilson, who was killed when Sajid drove into the back of her car in July 2023.
  - Staff at the University of Edinburgh vote to take strike action over a dispute involving plans to cut £40m from the university's budget.
  - West Lothian Council confirms that "personal or sensitive" data has been stolen during a cyberattack on the local authority's education network.
- 22 May – Reform UK are accused of "blatant" racism by Scottish Labour over an online advert which says that Anas Sarwar will "prioritise the Pakistani community".
- 23 May – A man is arrested after entering Glasgow's Queen Elizabeth University Hospital with a crossbow. The man is subsequently charged over the incident.
- 24 May – A co-driver is killed in the Jim Clark Rally in the Scottish Borders.
- 26 May –
  - Bailey Dowling is sentenced to life imprisonment with a minimum of 15 years for the murder of Lewis McCartney, who was stabbed in the Dumbiedykes area of Edinburgh in February 2023.
  - Bus drivers employed by Stagecoach Group in the west of Scotland stage a strike over a pay dispute.
- 27 May –
  - Ground staff at Glasgow and Edinburgh Airports have rejected a pay offer from Menzies Aviation, raising the threat of strike action during the summer.
  - More than 500 Aberdeen residents living in properties affected by reinforced autoclaved aerated concrete are to be offered the chance to explore alternative options to demolition.
- 28 May –
  - Plans to establish Scotland's third national park in Galloway are scrapped by the Scottish Government.
  - Irish rap group Kneecap say they have been axed from Glasgow's TRNSMT festival because of police concerns about safety.
- 29 May –
  - Former Scottish Conservative leader Douglas Ross is ejected from the Scottish Parliament during First Minister's Questions after talking over John Swinney's answer. Ross later questions the neutrality of the decision to eject him.
  - Thomas Robinson, who sold tea grown overseas as "Scottish-grown tea" to luxury hotels and shops, is convicted of a £550,000 fraud.
- 31 May –
  - Police are investigating the removal of Pride from a street in Arran as a hate crime.
  - Two Scottish nationals, subsequently named as Eddie Lyons Jnr and Ross Monaghan, are killed in a shooting at a bar in Fuengirola in Andalusia, Spain. Police later announce that they do not believe the deaths are linked to an ongoing gang feud in Scotland.

=== June ===
- 1 June – The sale of disposable vapes is banned in Scotland.
- 2 June – RSPB Scotland announces the death of Frisa, the UK's oldest white tailed eagle at the age of 32.
- 3 June – Lauren Baird, who dragged two police officers along the road in a "moment of panic" after trying to speed off when they stopped her to ask why she was not insured, is sentenced to 18 months in prison by Inverness Sheriff Court after earlier pleading guilty to culpable and reckless conduct.
- 4 June – Police in Portugal searching for Greg Monks, missing in the Algarve since 28 May, find a body.
- 5 June –
  - The Hamilton, Larkhall and Stonehouse by-election takes place following the death of Christina McKelvie, and is won by Davy Russel for Scottish Labour, who take the seat from the Scottish National Party.
  - Four men are handed prison sentences of between six and eight years respectively over a £6m NHS contract fraud described as "outrageous" by investigators.
  - BBC Radio Scotland presenter Bryan Burnett announces he will be taking a break from his programme to undergo cancer treatment.
- 8 June – Speaking on BBC Scotland's Sunday Show, Scottish Labour leader Anas Sarwar accuses the Scottish National Party of running a "dishonest and disgraceful" campaign ahead of the Hamilton, Larkhall and Stonehouse by-election by attempting to push voters towards Reform UK, whose candidate came third in the election.
- 9 June – A former physics teacher is struck off by the General Teaching Council for Scotland after she posted explicit images of herself on OnlyFans which were seen by students at her school.
- 11 June –
  - 2025 Spending Review: Scotland is to receive an average £2.9bn extra per year in UK government funding following the Spending Review.
  - 2025 Ballymena riots: Police Scotland agree to send officers to Northern Ireland following two nights of disturbances in Ballymena.
  - Up to 400 jobs at Alexander Dennis are at risk after the bus manufacturer announced plans to move its operations to England.
- 12 June –
  - First Minister John Swinney chairs a summit aimed at tackling the problem of youth violence.
  - The return to service of the passenger ferry MV Caledonian Isles following 18 months of repairs is temporarily postponed due to a last-minute technical problem.
  - NHS Grampian reverses a decision to stop providing free nappies for babies born in its hospitals.
  - Author Andrew Miller wins the Walter Scott Prize for Historical Fiction for his novel The Land in Winter.
- 14 June –
  - A man is killed and several people injured, including an eight-year-old girl, following a flat fire in Perth.
  - Broadcaster Shereen Nanjiani presents her final Saturday morning show for BBC Radio Scotland after 17 years.
- 16 June – First Minister John Swinney confirms that winter fuel payments for pensioners in Scotland will not be less than those in the rest of the UK.
- 17 June – Orkney Islands Council ends its two-year investigation into achieving greater autonomy after a report concluded it would be too difficult and expensive, and instead agrees to look at a single authority model.
- 19 June –
  - A man accused of the murder of two Scottish underworld figures in Spain appears before Westminster Magistrates, and is remanded in custody pending an extradition hearing.
  - BBC News Scotland reports that most first time buyers have been dropped from a Scottish Government scheme that helps people buy a home without having to fund the whole cost.
  - The principal and two senior board members resign from Dundee University following the publication of a critical report about its financial troubles, which led to a £220m government bailout.
  - The return to service of MV Caledonian Isles is postponed indefinitely after operators Cal Mac are unable to say how long it will take to fix a gearbox issue.
- 20 June –
  - The Scottish Government announces that WhatsApp and other non-corporate messaging services will be removed from its official phones.
  - Staff at the University of Edinburgh are scheduled to stage a one-day strike over a proposed £140m in budget cuts at the university.
- 24 June – Dundee University is to get a further £40m in financial support from the Scottish Government.
- 25 June –
  - Fraudster Thomas Robinson, who conned hotels into buying "Scottish-grown tea" that had in reality been grown abroad, is sentenced to three and a half years by Stirling Sheriff Court.
  - MSPs vote to approve the Education (Scotland) Bill which will see the Scottish Qualifications Authority replaced by Qualifications Scotland, and teh creation of a new inspector of education.
- 27 June – Nick Page is named as the new and final chief executive of the Scottish Qualifications Authority.
- 29 June –
  - Vandals smash 40 headstones and set fire to a large wooden cross at a cemetery in Renfrewshire. A man is subsequently charged over the incident.
  - Tower blocks at 305 and 341 Caledonia Road, The Gorbals, Glasgow, are destroyed in a controlled explosion to make way for new housing.
  - A wildfire is ignited near Loch Allan and spreads across the Scottish Highlands.
- 30 June – Train services on the West Coast Main Line are cancelled after a fallen tree damages overhead power lines between Carlisle and Lockerbie.

=== July ===
- 2 July – Chris Reilly resigns as chief financial officer of Dundee University after eight days in the post.
- 3 July –
  - Robert Peterson, a prisoner serving life for murder, is given a ten-year sentence for plotting to kill a prison officer who delayed his transport to hospital after he swallowed bags of cocaine and faked a heart attack.
  - Footage of a meteorite falling to earth in the Highlands is captured by a number of people; it is the first time a meteor has landed in Scotland for more than a century.
- 5 July – Police begin a murder investigation following the death of scientist Dr Fortune Gomo, who was found seriously injured on a street in Dundee. A man is subsequently charged in connection with the incident.
- 7 July –
  - Amazon removes a number of AI-generated unofficial biographies of Scotland's first ministers from sale after BBC News alerts them to a significant number of inaccuracies contained within the books.
  - Irish rap group Kneecap use a concert at the O2 Academy Glasgow to criticise Scotland's First Minister, John Swinney, for being among those who said the band should not appear at the TRNSMT festival.
- 9 July – Police Scotland confirms it is preparing for a potential visit later in the month by US President Donald Trump, who may travel to Scotland for the opening of a new golf course on the Menie Estate.
- 10 July –
  - Alan Spiers, Police Scotland's deputy chief constable, tells the BBC his force has the resources to deal with Donald Trump's potential visit after the Scottish Police Federation warned it would struggle to deal with the scenario.
  - The Unite, GMB and Unison unions have all voted in favour of a pay increase for council workers worth 4% in 2025–26 and 3.5% in 2026–27.
- 11 July – At Glasgow's High Court of Justiciary, a 17-year-old boy pleads guilty to planning mass murder by starting a fire at a mosque. He was arrested in January after police caught him in possession of an airgun and aerosol cans outside the mosque in Greenock.
- 12 July –
  - Scotland experiences its hottest day of 2025, with a temperature of 32 °C recorded at Aviemore in the Highlands.
  - A man is arrested after glass protecting the Stone of Destiny at Perth Museum is smashed.
- 14 July –
  - Ewan Methven, who killed his girlfriend, Phoenix Spencer-Horn, at a flat in Glen Lee, East Kilbride, in November 2024, is sentenced to life imprisonment with a minimum term of 23 years by the Glasgow High Court of Justiciary.
  - It is confirmed that Keir Starmer and John Swinney will meet US President Donald Trump when he travels to Scotland later in July for the opening of his golf course at Menie, Aberdeenshire.
  - Police launch an investigation following a large scale fire at Victoria Buildings in the centre of Kilmarnock.
- 15 July – Three women are arrested under the Terrorism Act 2000 after a van was driven into the fence of the Leonardo UK defence facility in Edinburgh.
- 17 July –
  - Police Scotland confirm that a man has been charged under the Terrorism Act 2000 after displaying a poster in support of the banned group Palestine Action.
  - A 12-year-old boy is arrested and charged in connection to a fire at Victoria Buildings in Kilmarnock which broke out on 14 July. He is to appear at Kilmarnock Sheriff Court later in the month.
- 18 July –
  - A second 12-year-old boy is arrested and charged by Police Scotland in connection with a fire at Victoria Buildings in Kilmarnock. He is expected to appear at Kilmarnock Sheriff Court later in July. Two 11-year-old boys were spoken to by officers from Police Scotland regarding the fire, with reports being issues to the relevant authorities.
  - NHS doctor Attiya Sheikh and her husband, Omer, are each sentenced to ten months in prison for illegally selling PPE on eBay during the COVID-19 pandemic.
  - Michael Harvey, who in October 2023 attacked a woman with whom he was in a relationship, leaving her with permanent brain damage, is sentenced to nine years in prison after being convicted of her attempted murder.
- 20 July – Three women are charged under the Terrorism Act over an incident in which a van was driven into a fence at a defence facility.
- 21 July –
  - Outgoing Scottish Greens co-leader Patrick Harvie is selected as the party's top candidate for the Scottish Parliament's Glasgow regional constituency, giving him a strong change of re-election at the 2026 Scottish Parliament election.
  - Former undisputed boxing world champion Josh Taylor announces his retirement from the sport following medical advice that to continue boxing would damage his eyesight.
- 22 July – Organisers of the Edinburgh Festival Fringe's Funniest Joke of the Fringe announce the award will not be given in 2025.
- 23 July – The Scottish Greens are forced to issue a new list of candidates for the next Holyrood election after an error was found in counting the votes.
- 24 July – Glasgow Prestwick Airport Ltd, the publicly owned company that runs Prestwick Airport, is fined more than £144,000 for failures that led to a worker falling to his death in January 2023.
- 25 July –
  - US President Donald Trump arrives at Prestwick Airport to begin a four-day private visit to the United Kingdom during which he will meet Prime Minister Keir Starmer and First Minister of Scotland John Swinney.
  - Former SNP MP Mhairi Black announces that she has left the party, citing its stance over transgender rights and Palestine as her main reasons for doing so.
- 26 July –
  - Donald Trump plays golf at his Turnberry Golf Resort, requiring a major security operation.
  - The SHEFA-2 undersea cable between Orkney and Banff is damaged overnight, causing internet disruption to residents in Shetland and Orkney.
  - A man is charged with the murder of Shona Stevens, who died in hospital after she was attacked near her home in Irvine in November 1994.
- 29 July – Trump completes his four-day visit to Scotland and returns to the United States.
- 30 July –
  - Teenager Felix Winter, who was obsessed with the perpetrators of the Columbine High School massacre and spoke of carrying out a similar killing spree at an Edinburgh school, is sentenced to six years in prison.
  - Global Energy completes a sale of the Port of Nigg in the Highlands to Japanese investor Mitsui.
- 31 July – Police Scotland launch an investigation after an eight-year-old boy was sexually assaulted at a campsite in the Highlands.

=== August ===
- 2 August – An Edinburgh Festival Fringe event involving first minister John Swinney is disrupted by pro-Palestine protesters.
- 3 August – The Met Office issues an amber weather warning for Scotland ahead of the arrival of Storm Floris.
- 4 August – Deputy First Minister of Scotland Kate Forbes announces she will not be a candidate in the 2026 Scottish Parliament election.
- 5 August –
  - Students in Scotland receive their National 5, Higher and Advanced Higher exam results, with those achieving an A, B, or C, slightly higher than in 2024.
  - Edinburgh High Court rules that Daniel Parker, who killed his mother with a crossbow at their home in May 2024 and said the devil had made him do it, must remain indefinitely at Carstairs State Hospital following the recommendation of psychiatrists.
- 6 August – Councillors in Aberdeen give their backing to a 7% tourist tax for overnight stays in accommodation in the city.
- 8 August – Power supplies are restored the last of the properties in the Highlands to be cut off by Storm Floris.
- 10 August – Firefighters tackle a gorse fire at Arthur's Seat in Edinburgh.
- 11 August – A court has concluded that former Edinburgh Academy PE teacher John Young, who at 91 was deemed by doctors to be too unfit to stand trial, abused more than a dozen of his pupils over a 27-year period.
- 12 August – The Scottish Fire and Rescue Service issues a wildfire warning for Scotland due to very dry conditions, advising against the use of naked flames outdoors. It is the tenth such warning to be issued in 2025, lasting from 13 to 20 August.
- 13 August – US Vice President JD Vance arrives in Scotland for a private family holiday.
- 14 August –
  - Bryan Burnett returns to his BBC Radio Scotland evening show following treatment for cancer.
  - The Crown Office and Procurator Fiscal Service decides to take no further action against the first woman arrested in Scotland under the Abortion Services (Safe Access Zones) (Scotland) Act 2024 for holding up a sign in a restricted area that stated, "Coercion is a crime, here to talk, if you want."
  - A Glasgow schoolgirl is named among Time Magazine's Girls of the Year for her invention of a solar blanket.
  - Unseasonable weather brings heavy rain, floods, mudslides and hailstones to parts of Scotland.
- 17 August –
  - US Vice President JD Vance leaves Scotland following his holiday.
  - Campaign group For Women Scotland has lodged an action at the Court of Session, claiming rules on transgender pupils in schools and transgender people in custody are "in clear breach" of a Supreme Court judgement in April.
- 19 August – Fife councillor David Graham is sentenced to 27 months in prison by Kirkcaldy Sheriff Court after being convicted at an earlier hearing for grooming and sexually abusing a 15-year-old girl in 2023. He has also been disqualified from holding public office.
- 21 August – A 17-year-old boy who planned a terrorist attack on a mosque is sentenced to ten years in prison.
- 22 August – MSP Jeremy Balfour resigns from the Scottish Conservatives, saying the party has "fallen into the trap of reactionary politics" under the leadership of Russell Findlay.
- 23 August – Sam Nicoresti becomes the first transgender person to win the award for Best Comedy Show at the Edinburgh Fringe.
- 24 August – Scottish councillors raise concerns that protests over asylum seekers could turn violent and "think" many demonstrators are being "bussed in" from elsewhere to attend marches.
- 25 August – ScotRail announces it is to replace its AI voice, Iona, first introduced in May, following criticism from voiceover artist Gayanne Potter, who expressed her dislike of the voice, which was based on her voice.
- 26 August –
  - National Records of Scotland releases details of the number of births in Scotland during 2024, which is the lowest since records began in 1855. A total of 45,763 births took place in Scotland in 2024, down 172 from 2023.
  - An independent review into Police Scotland finds evidence of sexism, misogyny and violence against women at both institutional and individual level within the force.
- 27 August – Scottish Conservative MSP Graham Simpson defects to Reform UK.
- 28 August –
  - MSP Colin Smyth has his Holyrood pass deactivated following allegations he placed a camera in a Scottish Parliament toilet.
  - Three teenagers are killed in a car crash on the A830 near Fort William.
- 29 August – 2025 Scottish Greens co-leadership election: Ross Greer and Gillian Mackay are elected as co-leaders of the Scottish Greens.
- 30 August – Large groups of pro- and anti-immigration protestors gather outside the Cladhan Hotel in Falkirk, the second large scale protest in the town within a month. Three arrests are made.
- 31 August – Derek Thomson is suspended as Secretary-General of the Scottish branch of Unite the union pending an internal investigation.

=== September ===
- 1 September – Peak time fares are scrapped on ScotRail train services.
- 3 September –
  - First Minister John Swinney announces a pause of public money from the Scottish Government to arms companies supplying weapons to Israel.
  - The Ellangowan Hotel in Creetown, the interior of which was used for scenes in the 1973 film The Wicker Man, is to be converted into flats.
- 4 September –
  - The Scottish Government publishes a new paper setting out the case for Scottish independence. First Minister John Swinney urges the UK government to hold a second Scottish independence referendum if the SNP wins a majority at the 2026 Scottish Parliament election.
  - Aberdeenshire Council suspends the removal of saltire flags from lampposts after its workers received threats and intimidation.
- 5 September – Douglas Alexander is appointed Secretary of State for Scotland, replacing Ian Murray.
- 6 September – Several thousand people take part in a rally in support of Scottish independence in Edinburgh organised by All Under One Banner.
- 8 September –
  - Roadworks begin on Junction 26 of the M8, Scotland's busiest motorway, which are scheduled to last until 10 May 2026.
  - Kevin Stewart, a former Scottish Government minister and the MSP for Aberdeen Central, announces he will stand down from Holyrood at the 2026 election on health grounds.
  - Staff at the University of Edinburgh begin a five-day strike over loans for £140m of budget cuts.
- 9 September – First Minister of Scotland John Swinney meets US President Donald Trump at the White House, where they have what are described as "constructive discussions" about tariffs on the import of scotch whisky to the United States.
- 11 September –
  - Train services on the Highland Main Line are disrupted after a car crashes onto the track between Perth and Dunkeld.
  - Renfrewshire Council writes to residents to ask them to remove flags from lamp posts.
- 12 September –
  - A sheriff orders the immediate eviction of three people ("King Atehehe" Kofi Offeh from Ghana, "Queen Nandi" Jean Gasho from Zimbabwe, and "handmaiden Asnat" Kaura Taylor from Texas) from the self-proclaimed Kingdom of Kubala who have been camping in private woodland near Jedburgh, which they claim was stolen from their ancestors 400 years ago.
  - Scottish rock band Franz Ferdinand have sponsored the youth football team Symington Tinto 2014s.
- 13 September – Edinburgh solicitor Tariq Ashkanani wins the McIlvanney Prize at the Bloody Scotland crime writing festival for his novel, The Midnight King.
- 15 September – Two critically ill children arrive with their families in Scotland from Gaza for treatment.
- 16 September – Scottish Borders Council begins a fresh legal bid to have three members of the self-proclaimed Kingdom of Kubala evicted from a new site on council-owned woodland a few metres from the previous site.
- 17 September – MSPs approve reforms to Scottish law that includes removing the "not proven" verdict as an option for juries in Scottish legal cases.
- 19 September – Jamie Hepburn resigns as the Scottish Government's Minister for Cabinet and Parliamentary Business following a complaint that he assaulted former Conservative leader Douglas Ross as the two were leaving the Scottish Parliament building two days earlier.
- 21 September – Former MP Callum McCaig is appointed chief executive of the Scottish National Party.
- 22 September – SNP councillor Grant Laing, resigns as leader of Perth and Kinross Council after he is charged with embezzlement.
- 23 September – Former minister Jamie Hepburn apologises to Holyrood for his conduct.
- 25 September –
  - The Scottish Fire and Rescue Service issues an extreme wildfire alert, the first in September since 2020.
  - STV announces plans to cut 60 jobs as part of cost saving measures; some STV News programming could also be axed.
- 27 September – MSP Foysol Choudhury is suspended from Scottish Labour over an allegation of inappropriate conduct.
- 29 September – The Scottish Government issues new guidelines for schools stipulating that they must provide separate toilets for boys and girls.
- 30 September – A lorry driver is killed after crashing at a bridge over the M8 in Glasgow.

=== October ===
- 2 October –
  - MSPs give their backing to proposals to create a new criminal offence for dog theft punishable by five years imprisonment.
  - Police, sheriff's officers, and Immigration Enforcement officials evict the 3 members of the self-proclaimed Kingdom of Kubala from their site on council-owned land, and arrest them on suspicion of immigration offences, followed by council workmen dismantling their camp.
- 3 October –
  - A man is taken to hospital after a bus crashes into a set of traffic lights and a building in Glasgow.
  - A number of train and ferry services are cancelled ahead of the arrival of Storm Amy.
- 4 October –
  - Storm Amy:
    - The storm hits Scotland much harder than expected, causing widespread damage and leaving tens of thousands of properties without power.
    - A gust of 96 mph has been recorded overnight in the Inner Hebrides.
- 5 October –
  - Storm Amy: Power has been restored to 71,000 properties two days after Storm Amy made landfall in Scotland.
  - Rangers F.C. sack Russell Martin as manager after 17 games because "results have not met expectations".
- 7 October – MSPs give their unanimous backing to the Criminal Justice Modernisation and Abusive Domestic Behaviour Reviews (Scotland) Bill which will review murders and suicides linked to domestic violence.
- 8 October –
  - At a hearing at the High Court of Justiciary in Glasgow, Gavin Gallagher is sentenced to life imprisonment with a minimum term of 20 years for the murder of Stephen Gray, who he doused in a mixture of boiling water and sugar before stabbing him in the heart in November 2023.
  - Neonatal nurse Amanda Muir, who committing pension fraud while pretending she had leukaemia, is sentenced to two years imprisonment during a hearing at Livingston Sheriff Court.
- 9 October – MSPs reject the Right to Addiction Recovery (Scotland) Bill, which would have given people with drug and alcohol addiction in Scotland a legal right to treatment.
- 10 October – Ash Regan resigns from the Alba Party in order to "focus" on her efforts to criminalise prostitution.
- 13 October – Following a hearing at the High Court of Justiciary in Glasgow, teenager Andrew Mason, who earlier pleaded guilty to attempted murder after pushing a woman in front of a train in Glasgow in April 2024, is detained at the State Hospital in Carstairs for psychiatric treatment.
- 15 October –
  - Following a trial at Edinburgh Court of Justiciary, Aren Pearson is found guilty of the February 2024 murder of his girlfriend, Claire Leveque, who was stabbed to death, and is sentenced to life imprisonment with a minimum term of 25 years.
  - Retired teacher Patricia Robertson is convicted of the historical abuse of 18 girls at Formethy House, a former residential school in Angus, between 1969 and 1984.
- 16 October – The ferry MV Glen Sannox returns to service following repairs.
- 19 October – BBC Radio Scotland presenter Kaye Adams is taken off air following an internal complaint about her behaviour. Her morning programme will be presented by Connie McLaughlin when it returns on Monday 20 October.
- 20 October –
  - A 3.3 magnitude earthquake is felt in Perthshire.
  - Danny Rohl is appointed manager of Glasgow Rangers.
  - Two people are killed and five taken to hospital following a flat fire in Glasgow.
- 21 October –
  - Stephen Flynn, the SNP's leader at Westminster, tables a motion urging the UK government to formally strip Prince Andrew of his royal titles following allegations made against him in the memoirs of Virginia Giuffre.
  - The first batch of tickets for the 2026 Commonwealth Games go on sale, with people living in Glasgow getting the first chance to purchase them.
  - Scotland's prison population reaches 8,430, its highest level on record, and surpassing a previous record set in 2012.
- 22 October – Former East Dunbartonshire councillor Andrew Polson is convicted of carrying out a romance fraud worth £188,000.
- 24 October – Three Scottish Green councillors defect to Jeremy Corbyn's Your Party, giving the party its first Scottish representatives.
- 27 October –
  - Five members of a Romanian grooming gang are sentenced to terms of between eight and 24 years in prison after being found guilty of sexually abusing 10 women in properties in Dundee.
  - Police Scotland issue a fresh appeal for information regarding the disappearance of Michael Bell, a man from Birmingham, who disappeared during a camping trip on the Isle of Skye in May 1983.
  - A speech being given by Director-General of the BBC Tim Davie in Glasgow is disrupted by pro-Palestine protesters.
- 28 October – The Scottish Football Association announces the closure of its performance centres following a review of youth development.
- 29 October –
  - It is announced that former SNP MP Mhairi Black is to join Counsels, a BBC legal drama set in Glasgow.
  - The Electoral Management Board for Scotland announces that votes for the 2026 Scottish Parliament election will be counted the day after the election rather than overnight.
- 30 October –
  - Plaid Cymru leader Rhun ap Iorwerth and SNP leader John Swinney hold talks to develop a "progressive alliance" between the two parties.
  - Edinburgh's Firework Control Zone comes into effect in certain areas ahead of Bonfire Night, with Glasgow doing the same the day after.
- 31 October – NHS Lothian confirms that the records of 100 patients were accessed during a data breach in September. A woman is subsequently charged in connection with the incident.

=== November ===
- 1 November – 5,000 people living in some of Scotland's most deprived areas are to be given free weight loss injections as part of a government-funded study led by the University of Glasgow.
- 2 November – Former SNP Cabinet Secretary for Health Jeane Freeman blames failures faced by NHS Scotland on successive governments including her own.
- 5 November – MSPs vote 85–25 in favour of the Land Reform (Scotland) Bill that aims to reduce the concentration of rural land ownership among a small number of people.
- 6 November – Glasgow band Kai Reesu win the 2025 Scottish Album of the Year Award for their debut album Kompromat vol.i.
- 7 November –
  - Offshore Energies UK has told North Sea Oil workers they must lose weight if they are to keep flying offshore, or face losing their jobs, as new weight restrictions allowing them to be winched by helicopter come into force from November 2026.
  - A school bus driver who viewed pornography on his phone while picking up and dropping off pupils is sentenced to 200 hours community service and a two-year supervision order after he was convicted of breaching the peace during the course of his employment.
- 8 November – A man accused of sexually assaulting a boy at a campsite in the Highlands is found dead in his cell while on remand at HMP Inverness.
- 11 November –
  - The Scottish Prison Service begins the early release of 1,000 prisoners as the prison population reaches a record high of 8,441.
  - The Teachers' Panel of the Scottish Negotiating Committee for Teachers (SNCT) unanimously votes to accept a two-year pay offer tabled by local authorities' umbrella body Cosla.
- 12 November – Police Scotland chief constable Jo Farrell says that rapists will always be recorded as men by the force.
- 13 November –
  - First Minister John Swinney confirms plans for the Scottish Government to issue its first bonds in 2026–27 after Scotland is given the same rating as the UK by credit rating agencies.
  - Gangland hitman Grant Hunter pleads guilty to the murder of Marc Webley, who was shot dead at a pub in Granton on New Year's Eve 2023.
- 14 November –
  - Control zones are put in place around a commercial poultry farm in South Lanarkshire following an outbreak of bird flu.
  - Scotland's first snowfall of the winter is recorded in Inverness.
- 18 November –
  - The UK government says it will not offer financial support to keep the ExxonMobil plant at Mossmorran open.
  - The Scottish Government scraps legislation to introduce heat pumps in homes and businesses for the second time this year.
  - Scotland reach their first World Cup since 1998 after defeating Denmark 4–2 to qualify for the 2026 FIFA World Cup.
- 19 November –
  - Snowfall across northern Scotland causes disruption, with dozens of schools closed because of the weather.
  - Andrew Polson, the former leader of East Dunbartonshire Council, is sentenced to 22 months in prison for a £188,000 romance fraud.
- 20 November –
  - At a hearing at the Edinburgh Court of Justiciary, Jorja Colville pleads guilty to causing the death of her three passengers after crashing when she drove round a bend at 85 mph.
  - COVID-19 in Scotland: Publication of the second report by the UK COVID-19 Inquiry, which criticises former First Minister Nicola Sturgeon for excluding her ministers in the decision-making process during the pandemic.
- 21 November –
  - The UK's coldest overnight November temperature since 2010 is recorded in Scotland, with a low of −12.7 °C at Tomintoul in Moray.
  - UEFA apologises to members of the Scottish Football Supporters Association after videos of Scotland fans celebrating their World Cup qualifier match victory were removed from social media.
- 24 November – Launch of Radio Scotland Breakfast, replacing Good Morning Scotland on BBC Radio Scotland. The programme is presented by Martin Geissler and Laura Maciver.
- 27 November – Former Brexit Party MEP David Coburn, who is named in a series of WhatsApp messages, rejects allegations he participated in a pro-Russian influence campaign in the European Parliament.
- 28 November – The railway line between Stranraer and Ayr closes for a £1m upgrade to reduce the risk of future flooding and disruption; it is scheduled to reopen again on 8 December.
- 29 November – BBC Radio Scotland sports broadcaster Kenny Macintyre announces that he has been diagnosed with prostate cancer during an edition of the station's Off the Ball programme.
- 30 November – The Scottish Languages Act 2025 comes into force, recognising Gaelic and Scots as official languages and enabling parents to ask for a Gaelic-language school to be established in their area.

=== December ===
- 2 December – Data from Public Health Scotland indicates that cases of influenza for the week ending 23 November were at 14.5 for every 100,000, an increase from 10 in every 100,000 the previous week.
- 3 December –
  - Maria Kelly, an employee at Leonardo UK in Edinburgh, loses a discrimination claim against the aerospace firm over their toilet policy for transgender staff after she objected to finding a transgender female in a women's toilet.
  - Retired teacher Patricia Robertson, who taught at Fornethy House in Angus between 1969 and 1984, is given a three-year supervision order after earlier being convicted of cruelty towards 18 girls in her care. She must also pay each of the girls £1,000.
  - The Scottish Government announces a review of evidence about grooming gangs operating in Scotland.
  - Wilfried Nancy is confirmed as the new manager of Celtic F.C. after signing a two-and-a-half year contract with the club.
- 5 December –
  - An Air Traffic Control outage at Edinburgh Airport leads to the suspension of flights for two hours, followed by delays.
  - Scottish Labour education spokeswoman Pam Duncan-Glancy resigns from her post over her friendship with a convicted sex offender, which she described as a "serious error of personal judgement".
- 6 December –
  - Two people are killed in a crash involving two vehicles on the A952 in Aberdeenshire.
  - Former Conservative minister and peer Malcolm Offord defects to Reform UK, and says he will stand down from the House of Lords to campaign in the 2026 Scottish Parliament election.
- 7 December – The 19th century Pollokshaws Parish Church in Glasgow is damaged by an overnight fire.
- 8 December –
  - Peggie v NHS Fife: a female nurse who objected to sharing a changing room with a doctor who was a transgender woman wins her claim for harassment but not for discrimination and victimisation.
  - Deputy Chief Constable Jane Connors is suspended by Police Scotland over allegations of bullying.
  - Three men and a woman are sentenced to life imprisonment with minimum terms of at least 20 years for the murder of Stephen Hutton at a flat in Dundee in March 2024, the incident described as a "punishment beating".
  - STV Radio announces that its breakfast show will be sponsored by CR Smith when it launches in early 2026.
  - Part of the Spey Viaduct, an iron girder railway bridge over the River Spey near Garmouth, collapses. The bridge is subsequently cordoned off by police.
- 10 December – The Supreme Court rules that the family of a man who died from lung cancer relating to asbestosis can sue his former employer, Scottish Power.
- 11 December – David McCann, editor of The Times and The Sunday Times in Scotland, is suspended from his post after being charged over alleged indecent online communications.
- 12 December –
  - Firefighters attend a blaze at a bus depot in Greenock.
  - Reform wins its first election in Scotland after David McLennan is elected as a councillor in Whitburn and Blackburn in West Lothian, taking the seat from Scottish Labour.
- 13 December – The Met Office issues an amber weather alert for flooding for south west Scotland following prolongued heavy rain, and a yellow alert for much of the west, which comes info force from Midnight.
- 15 December – Following a consultation, the Scottish Government scraps plans to reduce the national speed limit on single-lane carriageways from 60 mph to 50 mph.
- 16 December – MSPs pass the Dog Theft (Scotland) Bill by 119 votes to two, making an offence of dog theft with a prison sentence of up to five years.
- 18 December – First Minister John Swinney says reports of a staff member secretly recording an SNP MSP they worked for are "completely and utterly unacceptable".
- 19 December –
  - BMA Scotland confirms that resident doctors have voted to take strike action over a pay dispute, the first time doctors will go on strike in Scotland. A strike is scheduled for 13–17 January 2026.
  - Ten people are charged in connection with a photograph showing a group of people with an SS banner making fascist salutes outside Kirkcaldy Town Hall which was circulated online.
  - Scottish Action for Mental Health launches a campaign to cut suicide rates among North Sea oil and gas workers.
- 20 December – A search begins after an unoccupied creel boat is washed ashore in Aberdeenshire.
- 21 December – Scottish Labour MSP Pam Duncan-Glancy confirms she will not seek re-election to the Scottish Parliament at the 2026 election because she does not want her friendship with a convicted sex offender to "become a distraction".
- 22 December –
  - People are being warned to look out for the poisonous plant hemlock water dropwort after it was spotted washed up on a beach in the area.
  - Cameron McGregor, who waged a 14-year campaign of rape and violence against five women in the Dundee and Newport-on-Tay areas between 2008 and 2022, is sentenced to eight years in prison.
- 23 December –
  - Justice Secretary Angela Constance is to be investigated over comments she made about a grooming gang expert to determine whether she broke the ministerial code.
  - Afghan asylum seeker Rapualla Ahmadze is sentenced to nine years in prison for raping a teenage girl in a park.
  - Edinburgh's Court of Session rules that a doctors can give a blood transfusion to a 14-year-old girl who is a Jehovah's Witness should she require it following an operation. The girl, who is a minor, had said that she did not want a transfusion.
- 24 December –
  - Figures from Public Health Scotland indicate a drop in flu cases for the week ending 21 December, with 1,297 confirmed cases that week, compared to 1,994 the previous week.
  - New restrictions are put in place following an outbreak of avian flu at a farm in the Borders region.
- 25 December –
  - American company CB&I buts part of Petrofac out of administration, potentially saving as many as 2,000 jobs in the oil and gas sector.
  - Police Scotland launch an investigation after a man with injuries is found in a Glasgow street and is pronounced dead on arrival at hospital.
  - Firefighters are called to an incident on the runway of Aberdeen Airport after a Loganair flight to Dublin was unable to take off.
- 27 December –
  - Firefighters are called to tackle a large blaze at the Revolver Hotel in Glasgow City Centre.
  - The Baptist Church at Baugh on the island of Tiree is destroyed by fire overnight after a blaze broke out late on Boxing Day.
- 29 December –
  - A man appears in court charged with the murder of Dean Kennedy, who was found stabbed in a Glasgow street on Christmas Day, and also the stabbing of three other men.
  - A silver coin minted during the reign of David I is acquired by National Museums Scotland.
- 30 December – Brian Stobie is sentenced to 12 years in prison after being convicted of a series of sexual offences against four girls between 1990 and 2007.
- 31 December – Data from Public Health Scotland shows a 43% fall in flu cases over the Christmas period, with 751 cases recorded in the week to 28 December, compared to 1,317 the previous week.

== Deaths ==
- 6 January – John Douglas, 90, Scottish rugby union player (Barbarian, British & Irish Lions, national team). (death announced on this date)
- 11 January – Bobby Kennedy, 87, Scottish football player (Manchester City, Kilmarnock) and manager (Grimsby Town).
- 12 January – Peter Brown, 83, Scottish rugby union player (Glasgow, national team).
- 17 January – Denis Law, 84, Scottish footballer (Manchester United, Huddersfield Town, national team), Alzheimer's disease.
- 19 January – Jimmy Calderwood, 69, Scottish football player (Birmingham City) and manager (Dunfermline Athletic, Aberdeen), complications from dementia.
- 6 February – Gordon Marshall, 85, English-Scottish footballer (Heart of Midlothian, Newcastle United, Arbroath). (death announced on this date)
- 17 February – Jamie Muir, 82, Scottish painter and musician (King Crimson).
- 18 February – James Martin, 93, Scottish actor (Still Game).
- 19 February – Cammy Murray, 80, Scottish footballer (St. Mirren, Motherwell, Arbroath).
- 20 February – Evan Williams, 81, Scottish footballer (Wolverhampton Wanderers, Celtic, Clyde).
- 1 March – Jack Vettriano, 73, Scottish painter.
- 9 March – Dick McTaggart, 89, Scottish boxer, Olympic champion (1956).
- 17 March – John Fraser, 88, Scottish footballer (Hibernian, Stenhousemuir). (death announced on this date)
- 27 March – Christina McKelvie, 57, Scottish politician, MSP (since 2007), minister for culture (2023–2024) and drugs and alcohol policy (since 2024), breast cancer.
- 4 April – Paul Karo, 89, Scottish-born Australian actor (Quiet Night, The Box, Prisoner).
- 13 April – Paddy Higson, 83, Scottish film producer (The Magdalene Sisters) and production supervisor (Gregory's Girl).
- 16 April – Bill Aitken, 90, Scottish-born Indian travel writer, complications from a fall.
- 23 April –
  - David Clunie, 77, Scottish footballer (Heart of Midlothian, Berwick Rangers, St Johnstone). (death announced on this date)
  - Jim Herriot, 85, Scottish footballer (Dunfermline Athletic, Birmingham City, national team).
- 5 May – Jake Findlay, 70, Scottish footballer (Aston Villa, Luton Town, Swindon Town). (death announced on this date)
- 9 May – Tom Farmer, 84, Scottish entrepreneur
- 17 May – Gawn Grainger, 87, Scottish actor and writer.
- 18 May – John Simpson, 100, Scottish-born New Zealand silversmith and fine arts academic.
- 22 May – Alasdair MacIntyre, 96, Scottish-American philosopher (After Virtue). (death announced on this date)
- 27 May –
  - Willie Stevenson, 85, Scottish footballer (Rangers, Liverpool, Stoke City). (death announced on this date)
  - Brian Kellock, 63, Scottish jazz pianist.
- 28 May – Graeme Crawford, 77, Scottish footballer (York City, Scunthorpe United, Scarborough). (death announced on this date)
- 1 June – Lachie Stewart, 81, Scottish Olympic runner (1972).
- 12 June – Geoff Palmer, 85, Scottish professor
- 16 June – John Reid, 61, Scottish record producer, singer (Nightcrawlers) and songwriter. (death announced on this date)
- 19 June – James Prime, 64, Scottish musician (Deacon Blue), cancer.
- 20 June – Ian McLauchlan, 83, Scottish rugby union player (national team, British & Irish Lions).
- 23 June –
  - John Clark, 84, Scottish football player (Celtic, national team) and manager (Clyde). (death announced on this date)
- 29 June – Sandy Gall, 97, Scottish journalist and television presenter.
- 9 July – Glen Michael, 99, children's television presenter and entertainer (Glen Michael's Cartoon Cavalcade).
- 14 July – Charlie Miller, 80, celebrity hairdresser.
- 21 July – Kenneth Calman, 83, Scottish doctor and academic, Chief Medical Officer for Scotland 1989–91.
- 22 July – Sir Jamie McGrigor, 6th Baronet, 75, Scottish politician, MSP (1999–2016). (death announced on this date)
- 12 August –
  - David Milne, 66, Scottish rugby union player (Heriot's, Edinburgh District, national team).
  - Sir George Reid, 86, Scottish politician, presiding officer of the Scottish Parliament (2003–2007), kidney cancer.
- 14 August – Sammy Johnston, 58, Scottish footballer (St Johnstone, Glenavon, Partick Thistle).
- 15 August – Gary Little, 60s, Scottish comedian. (death reported on this date)
- 16 August – John Cruickshank, 105, Scottish Royal Air Force officer, Victoria Cross recipient. (death announced on this date)
- 21 August – Rod Petrie, 69, Scottish football executive, chairman of Hibernian (2004–2019), cancer.
- 23 August – Giles Havergal, 87, Scottish theatre director, actor and adaptor.
- 1 September – Jimmy Bone, 75, Scottish footballer.
- 3 September – Bobby Graham, 80, Scottish footballer (Liverpool, Motherwell).
- 4 September – Jamie Harvey, 70, Scottish darts player.
- 18 September – Sir Gerald Gordon, 96, Scottish lawyer. (death announced on this date)
- 19 September – JD Twitch, 57, Scottish DJ (Optimo).
- 24 October – Bob Wilson, 91, Scottish footballer.
- 31 October – Willie Young, 73, Scottish footballer (Aberdeen, Arsenal, Nottingham Forest). (death announced on this date)
- 1 November –
  - Archie Fisher, 86, Scottish folk singer and songwriter.
  - Elspeth King, 76, Scottish art curator.
- 2 November – David Gow, 80, Scottish journalist (The Guardian).
- 26 November –
  - Pam Hogg, 66, Scottish fashion designer.
  - Tommy Murray, 82, Scottish footballer (Carlisle United, Heart of Midlothian, Airdrieonians).
- 9 December – Dixie Deans, 79, Scottish footballer (Motherwell, Celtic, national team).
- 11 December – Stanley Baxter, 99, Scottish actor (Crooks Anonymous, Very Important Person) and comedian (The Stanley Baxter Show), BAFTA winner (1961).
- 22 December – Richard Cramb, 62, Scottish rugby union player (Harlequins, London Scottish, national team), cancer.**Jonathan Hawkins, 42, English chess grandmaster.
- 23 December – Jimmy Miller, 72, Scottish footballer (Morton, Motherwell, Queen of the South). (death announced on this date)
- 25 December – John Robertson, 72, Scottish footballer (Nottingham Forest, national team).
