= 1871 in Scotland =

- Centuries: 17th; 18th; 19th; 20th; 21st
- Decades: 1850s; 1860s; 1870s; 1880s; 1890s
- See also: List of years in Scotland; Timeline of Scottish history 1871 in: The UK • Wales • Elsewhere; Scottish football: • 1871–72

Events from the year 1871 in Scotland.

== Incumbents ==
=== Law officers ===
- Lord Advocate – George Young
- Solicitor General for Scotland – Andrew Rutherfurd-Clark

=== Judiciary ===
- Lord President of the Court of Session and Lord Justice General – Lord Glencorse
- Lord Justice Clerk – Lord Moncreiff

== Events ==
- 7 March – the first rugby international, played in Edinburgh, results in a 4–1 win by Scotland over England.
- 26 May – Parliament passes the Bank Holidays Act which creates five annual bank holidays in Scotland.
- 1 August – the Arlington Swimming Club, designed by John Burnet, opens in the district of Charing Cross, Glasgow.
- 6 November – the Edinburgh Street Tramways Company begins operating horsecars, the first tram system in Scotland.
- 10 November – missing Scottish explorer and missionary Dr. David Livingstone is located by journalist Henry Morton Stanley in Ujiji, near Lake Tanganyika.
- Patent Asbestos Manufacturing Co. established in Glasgow, perhaps the first such plant in the U.K.
- Thomas Lipton opens his first grocery shop, in Glasgow.

== Births ==
- 21 January – Ernest Kitto, cricketer in New Zealand (died 1897 at sea)
- 27 January – Samuel Peploe, painter (died 1935)
- 17 February
  - John A. Gilruth, veterinary surgeon and colonial administrator (died 1937 in Australia)
  - Peter Corsar Anderson, golfer (died 1955)
- 10 September – Thomas Adams, urban planner (died 1940)
- 12 September – John Campbell, international footballer (died 1947)
- Lachlan Grant, physician (died 1945)
- Thomas W. Lamb, theatre architect in the United States (died 1942)

== Deaths ==
- 5 February – James Munro, soldier, recipient of the Victoria Cross (born 1826)
- 17 March – Robert Chambers, publisher and geologist (born 1802)
- 20 April – Samuel Halkett, librarian (born 1814)
- 6 September – James Burns, shipowner (born 1789)
- 22 October – Roderick Murchison, geologist (born 1792)

== The arts ==
- William Alexander's realist novel Johnny Gibb of Gushetneuk is published in book form (having been serialised in the Aberdeen Free Press 1869-70).
- William Black's novel A Daughter of Heth is published.

== See also ==
- Timeline of Scottish history
- 1871 in Ireland
