= 1946 in Scotland =

- Centuries: 18th; 19th; 20th; 21st
- Decades: 1920s; 1930s; 1940s; 1950s; 1960s
- See also: List of years in Scotland; Timeline of Scottish history 1946 in: The UK • England • Wales • Elsewhere; Scottish football: 1945–46 • 1946–47

Events from the year 1946 in Scotland.

== Incumbents ==
- Secretary of State for Scotland and Keeper of the Great Seal – Joseph Westwood

=== Law officers ===
- Lord Advocate – George Reid Thomson
- Solicitor General for Scotland – Daniel Blades

=== Judiciary ===
- Lord President of the Court of Session and Lord Justice General – Lord Normand
- Lord Justice Clerk – Lord Cooper
- Chairman of the Scottish Land Court – Lord Gibson

== Events ==
- 16 March – American Liberty ship Byron Darnton runs aground off Sanda Island; all 54 aboard are rescued.
- 13 April – a crowd of 139,468 at Hampden Park, Glasgow, watch the Scotland national football team defeat England 1-0 in a Victory International series Association football match.
- 3 May — The Hoover Company opens a factory at Cambuslang.
- 10 July – a crowd of 45,000 at Hampden Park watch Jackie Paterson defend his world flyweight boxing title.
- 25 July – a train collides with a bus which has crashed through level crossing gates at Balmuckety near Kirriemuir, killing 10.
- 27 August – MV Princess Victoria, the first roll-on/roll-off ferry built for service in British waters (the Stranraer–Larne crossing), is launched at William Denny and Brothers' shipyard in Dumbarton.
- 22–27 November – the last election for a university constituency in the United Kingdom is held when the Combined Scottish Universities by-election is held. Walter Elliot (Unionist) wins decisively.
- 5 December
  - A Kilmarnock by-election results in Willie Ross holding the seat for Labour.
  - Scottish edition of the Daily Mail begins publication in Edinburgh.
- Drift mine opened in Machrihanish Coalfield.
- Naturalist Gavin Maxwell purchases the island of Soay, Skye, and attempts to start a commercial shark fishing enterprise there.

== Births ==
- 6 January – John Duignan, economist and writer (died 2019)
- 16 January – Graham Masterton, horror author
- 30 January – Donald Mackay, Baron Mackay of Drumadoon, Lord Advocate
- 28 February – Robin Cook, Labour MP and Foreign Secretary (died 2005)
- 12 April – George Robertson, politician, Secretary General of NATO
- May – Jock Brown, solicitor and football commentator
- 10 May – Donovan, singer, songwriter and guitarist
- 13 May – Bill Torrance, broadcaster
- 1 June – Brian Cox, actor
- 15 June – Michael Lynch), historian
- 9 June – James Kelman, novelist
- 9 July – Bon Scott, hard rock musician (AC/DC) in Australia (died 1980 in London)
- 10 July – Stuart Christie, anarchist (died 2020)
- 16 July – Charles McKean, Professor of Scottish Architectural History (died 2013)
- 29 July – Bill Forsyth, film director
- 19 August – Christopher Malcolm, television and film actor (died 2014 in London)
- 25 August – Gavin Clydesdale Reid, economist
- 27 August – Peter Tobin, serial killer and sex offender
- 14 September – Pete Agnew, rock bassist and backing vocalist
- 14 October – Dan McCafferty, rock singer-songwriter (died 2022)
- 27 October – Margaret Bennett, ethnologist
- 6 November – George Young, rock musician in Australia (died 2017)
- 18 November
  - Andrea Allan, actress
  - Chris Rainbow (born Christopher James Harley), pop rock singer and musician (died 2015)
- 14 December – Peter Lorimer, international footballer (died 2021)
- Louise Martin, sports administrator
- Gordeanna McCulloch, folk singer with The Clutha
- Ronald Rae, sculptor

== Deaths ==
- 17 February – Sir George Pirie, painter (born 1863)
- 18 February – Catherine Carswell, biographer and journalist (born 1879)
- 20 May – Jane Findlater, novelist (born 1866)
- 5 June – James Craig Annan, photographer (born 1864)
- 14 June – John Logie Baird, television pioneer (born 1888; died in England)
- 15 July – Binnie Dunlop, editor and advocate of eugenics (born 1874)
- 23 July – James Maxton, MP and leader of the Independent Labour Party (born 1885)
- 6 August – Benny Lynch, flyweight boxer (born 1913)
- 18 August – Marion Angus, Scots language poet (born 1865 in England)
- 9 September – Violet Jacob, historical novelist (born 1863)

== Arts and literature ==
- 22 May – English writer George Orwell leaves London to spend much of the next 18 months at Barnhill, Jura, working on his dystopian novel Nineteen Eighty-Four.
- Summer – Robert McLeish's The Gorbals Story is premiered by Glasgow Unity Theatre at the Queens Theatre.
- Oriel Malet's fictionalised biography of Marjory Fleming is published.
- Janet Adam Smith's Life Among the Scots is published.
- The Central Office of Information short film The Glen is Ours is released.

== See also ==
- 1946 in Northern Ireland
- 1946 in Wales
