= 1948 in Scotland =

- Centuries: 18th; 19th; 20th; 21st
- Decades: 1920s; 1930s; 1940s; 1950s; 1960s
- See also: List of years in Scotland; Timeline of Scottish history 1948 in: The UK • Wales • Elsewhere; Scottish football: 1947–48 • 1948–49

Events from the year 1948 in Scotland.

== Incumbents ==
- Secretary of State for Scotland and Keeper of the Great Seal – Arthur Woodburn

=== Law officers ===
- Lord Advocate – John Thomas Wheatley
- Solicitor General for Scotland – Douglas Johnston

=== Judiciary ===
- Lord President of the Court of Session and Lord Justice General – Lord Cooper
- Lord Justice Clerk – Lord Thomson
- Chairman of the Scottish Land Court – Lord Gibson

== Events ==
- 1 January – A Scottish Region of British Railways begins to operate as a result of nationalisation of rail transport in Great Britain under the Transport Act 1947.
- 6 February – Last judicial hanging at HM Prison Perth, Stanislaw Miszka for the murder of Catherine McIntyre.
- June – During this year's Highland Show, held at Inverness, the Royal title is bestowed on the event by King George VI.
- 30 June – Glenrothes is designated as a new town under the New Towns Act 1946.
- 5 July – The National Health Service begins operating as a result of the National Health Service (Scotland) Act 1947.
- 20 October – 1948 KLM Constellation air disaster: A KLM Lockheed Constellation airliner crashes into power cables on approach to Prestwick Airport, killing all 40 on board.
- 20 December – Scottish advocate Margaret Kidd becomes the first British woman King's Counsel in Britain.
- Timex watch and clock factory in Dundee begins operation.
- State Institution for Mental Defectives opens at Carstairs for those with mental disorder following temporary use of the premises as an Army hospital.

== Births ==
- 8 January – Gillies MacKinnon, film director
- 11 January – Joe Harper, international footballer
- 3 February – Maev Alexander, television and stage actress
- 9 February – David Hayman, actor and director
- 24 February – Walter Smith, football manager (died 2021)
- 26 February – Malcolm MacDonald, classical music critic (died 2014 in England)
- 3 March – Rosemary Byrne, Scottish Socialist Party then Solidarity MSP (2003–2007)
- 7 March - Adam McLean, writer on alchemical texts
- 25 March – Lynn Faulds Wood, television consumer affairs presenter and health campaigner (died 2020 in England)
- 29 March – Marjorie Ritchie, animal researcher and animal surgeon, part of team who cloned Dolly the sheep (died 2015)
- 8 April – Barbara Young, public servant and Labour peer
- 20 April – Merlin Hay, 24th Earl of Erroll, colonel and politician, Lord High Constable of Scotland
- 28 April – Scott Fitzgerald, born William McPhail, singer and musical actor
- 11 May – Fiona Woolf, born Catherine Fiona Swain, lawyer and Lord Mayor of London
- 21 May – Denis MacShane, born Denis Matyjaszek, journalist and Labour Party MP
- 8 June – Lorna Heilbron, actress
- 10 June – Brian Adam, politician and biochemist (died 2013)
- 15 June – Henry McLeish, footballer, Labour Party MP (1987–2001), MSP (1999–2001) and First Minister of Scotland (2000–2001)
- 19 June – David MacLennan, theatre actor and producer (died 2014)
- 20 June – Alan Longmuir, pop guitarist with the Bay City Rollers (died 2018)
- 18 July – Jim Watt, lightweight boxer
- 5 August – Gordon Jackson, Labour Party MSP (1999–2007) and lawyer
- 11 August – Don Boyd, film director, producer, screenwriter and novelist
- 24 October – Frank McPhee, gangland boss (died 2000)
- 3 November – Lulu, born Marie McDonald McLaughlin Lawrie, singer
- 24 November – Barry Simmons, quiz player
- 29 November – David Rintoul, actor
- 8 December – Peter Blake, actor (died 2018)
- 13 December – Brian Wilson, Labour Party MP (1987–2005)
- 31 December – Sandy Jardine, international footballer and manager (died 2014)
- David Annand, sculptor
- James Cosmo, actor
- James Hunter, historian
- John Kay, economist
- Edward McGuire, composer
- Robert Mone, murderer
- John Lowrie Morrison, artist
- Janet Paisley, writer (died 2018)
- Tom Russell, rock disc jockey

== Deaths ==
- 31 January – Oscar Slater, acquitted of murder (born 1872 in Silesia)
- 21 February – Frederic Lamond, classical pianist and composer, pupil of Franz Liszt (born 1868)
- 9 March - William J. Watson, toponymist (born 1865)
- 27 March - Douglas Ainslie, poet, translator, critic and diplomat (born 1865)
- 28 May – Unity Mitford, socialite and fascist (born 1914 in England)
- 1 June – David Anderson, Lord St Vigeans, Scottish advocate and judge, Chairman of the Scottish Land Court 1918–34 (born 1862)
- 21 June – D'Arcy Wentworth Thompson, biologist (born 1860)
- 17 July – Joseph Westwood, Labour MP (1922–31, 1935–1948) (born 1884)
- 19 November – Charles Jarvis, soldier, Victoria Cross recipient (born 1881)
- 24 November - O. Douglas, novelist (born 1877)

== The arts ==
- Sydney Goodsir Smith's Under the Eildon Tree: a poem in XXIV elegies is published in Edinburgh.

== See also ==
- 1948 in Northern Ireland
