= 1945 in Scotland =

- Centuries: 18th; 19th; 20th; 21st
- Decades: 1920s; 1930s; 1940s; 1950s; 1960s
- See also: List of years in Scotland; Timeline of Scottish history 1945 in: The UK • England • Wales • Elsewhere; Scottish football: 1944–45 • 1945–46

Events from the year 1945 in Scotland.

== Incumbents ==
- Secretary of State for Scotland and Keeper of the Great Seal – Tom Johnston until 23 May; then The Earl of Rosebery until 26 July; then vacant until 3 August; then Joseph Westwood

=== Law officers ===
- Lord Advocate – James Reid until August; then George Reid Thomson
- Solicitor General for Scotland – Sir David King Murray until September; then Daniel Blades

=== Judiciary ===
- Lord President of the Court of Session and Lord Justice General – Lord Normand
- Lord Justice Clerk – Lord Cooper
- Chairman of the Scottish Land Court – Lord Gibson

== Events ==
- March – Bruce Report (First Planning Report to the Highways and Planning Committee of the Corporation of the City of Glasgow) published, proposing massive regeneration and rebuilding in central Glasgow.
- 13 April – the Motherwell by-election results in the first Scottish National Party Member of Parliament, Robert McIntyre, being elected to the Parliament of the United Kingdom after taking the seat from Labour.
- 14 April – German submarine U-1206 sinks off Peterhead.
- 7 May – at 23:00 the SS Avondale Park is torpedoed and sunk by German submarine U-2336 off the Firth of Forth with two killed, the last British-flagged merchant ship lost to German action.
- 8 May – V-E Day is celebrated throughout the U.K.
- 10 May – German U-boats begin to surrender at Loch Eriboll.
- 12 May – official inauguration of Churchill Barriers on Orkney.
- 20 May – 30 surrendered German U-boats are escorted into Kyle of Lochalsh from Loch Eriboll for onward movement to Londonderry Port.
- 30 May–6 June – 64 surrendered German U-boats from Norway are processed at Scapa Flow for onward movement to Londonderry Port or Cairnryan. Until 30 June, U-boats are escorted directly to these ports from Norway and Germany via the Pentland Firth.
- 13 June – a Consolidated B-24 Liberator, returning from Prestwick to the United States, crashes over the Fairy Lochs with the loss of all 15 on board.
- 26 July – results of 1945 United Kingdom general election, declared. In Scotland, as in the rest of Great Britain, Labour have a majority of the seats with an 11% swing in their favour, and regain the Motherwell seat from the SNP. Ernest Brown, leader of the National Liberal Party, loses his seat at Leith to Labour and Sir Archibald Sinclair, leader of the U.K. Liberal Party, comes third in the poll at Caithness and Sutherland.
- 14 August – George Reid Thomson installed as Lord Advocate, replacing James Reid
- 15 August – V-J Day is celebrated throughout the U.K.
- December – Alexander Fleming shares the Nobel Prize in Physiology or Medicine.

== Births ==
- 6 January – Martin O'Neill, Baron O'Neill of Clackmannan, politician
- 12 January – Maggie Bell, rock vocalist
- 5 February – Joe Fascione, footballer (died 2019)
- 7 February – Ian Jack, English-born journalist (died 2022)
- 19 February – Jon Whiteley, child actor and art historian (died 2020)
- 21 March – Meston Reid, opera singer and actor (died 1993)
- 24 March – Alexander Morton, actor
- 21 April – Alasdair Morgan, politician
- 24 April – Graeme Catto, physician and academic
- 12 May – Jimmy Ryan, footballer
- 3 June – Bill Paterson, actor
- 4 June – Gordon Waller, singer-songwriter (died 2009 in the United States)
- 10 June – Benny Gallagher, singer-songwriter
- 28 June – Ken Buchanan, undisputed world lightweight boxing champion (died 2023)
- 3 July – Michael Martin, Speaker of the House of Commons (died 2018)
- 19 July – Richard Henderson, molecular biologist, recipient of the Nobel Prize in Chemistry (2017)
- 30 July – Tom Devine, historian
- 1 August – David Anderson, actor, playwright and jazz musician
- 7 August – Kenny Ireland, actor and theatre director (died 2014 in London)
- 24 August – Malcolm "Molly" Duncan, tenor saxophonist and founding member of Average White Band (died 2019 in Bocholt, Germany)
- 5 September
  - Dean Ford (born Thomas McAleese), singer and songwriter (died 2018 in Los Angeles)
  - Al Stewart, folk rock singer-songwriter
- 18 September – John McAfee, English-born Scottish American computer programmer (died 2021 in Spain)
- 25 September – Owen "Onnie" McIntyre, guitarist and singer with Average White Band
- 27 September – Bob Spiers, director and producer (died 2008)
- 18 October – Sam Galbraith, brain surgeon, Labour MP (1987–2001) and MSP (1999–2001) and long-term lung transplantation survivor (born in Clitheroe; died 2014)
- 19 October – Angus Deaton, economist, recipient of the Nobel Memorial Prize in Economic Sciences (2015)
- 27 October – John Kane, actor and writer
- 27 October – Andrew McCulloch, television writer and actor
- 23 November – Dennis Nilsen, serial killer (died 2018 in England)
- 7 December – Clive Russell, actor

== Deaths ==
- 21 February – Eric Liddell, athlete, international rugby union player and missionary (born 1902 in China; died in Weihsien Compound)
- 13 March – Andrew Wilson, international footballer (born 1880)
- 20 March – Dorothy Campbell, golfer (born 1883)
- 31 March – G. Topham Forrest, architect, chief architect for the London County Council (born 1872)
- 20 April – Kenneth Mackenzie, bishop of Argyll and The Isles (born 1863)
- 26 May – Robert MacKenzie, rugby union player (born 1856)
- 31 May – Lachlan Grant, physician (born 1871)
- 16 September – Sir David Young Cameron, painter (born 1865)
- 4 October – John Guthrie Tait, educator, principal of the Central College of Bangalore, and sportsman (born 1861)
- 30 October – Atholl MacGregor, colonial judge (born 1883)
- John Duncan, symbolist painter (born 1866)
- George Johnston, engineer, constructor of Scotland's first automobile (born 1855)

== The arts ==
- 11 September – the Citizens Theatre opens in Glasgow under this name.
- Ena Lamont Stewart's play Starched Aprons is premiered by the MSU Repertory Theatre in Rutherglen.

== Sport ==
- Stirling Albion F.C. established.

== See also ==
- 1945 in Northern Ireland
