= 1867 in Scotland =

- Centuries: 17th; 18th; 19th; 20th; 21st
- Decades: 1840s; 1850s; 1860s; 1870s; 1880s
- See also: List of years in Scotland; Timeline of Scottish history 1867 in: The UK • Wales • Elsewhere

Events from the year 1867 in Scotland.

== Incumbents ==
=== Law officers ===
- Lord Advocate – George Patton until February; then Edward Strathearn Gordon
- Solicitor General for Scotland – Edward Strathearn Gordon; then John Millar

=== Judiciary ===
- Lord President of the Court of Session and Lord Justice General – Lord Colonsay until 25 February; then Lord Glencorse
- Lord Justice Clerk – Lord Glenalmond, then Lord Moncreiff

== Events ==
- 29 April – the Caledonian Mercury newspaper is last published.
- 9 July – Queen's Park F.C., Scotland's first senior football club, is formed.
- 29 August – John Hill Burton is appointed Historiographer Royal.
- 15 October – a Statue of Albert, Prince Consort is unveiled in the grounds of Balmoral Castle, 6 years after his death.
- 28 November – opening of Baylis's Royal Colosseum Theatre and Opera House, Glasgow, which becomes the Theatre Royal, Glasgow in May 1869.
- Edinburgh Crystal glass is first manufactured, by the Edinburgh and Leith Flint Glass Company.
- The West of Scotland Grand National, predecessor of the Scottish Grand National, moves to a new course, Bogside Racecourse near Irvine, North Ayrshire.

== Births ==
- 26 April – William Barr, landscape painter (died 1933 in the United States)
- 3 June – George Henry Walton, architect and designer (died 1933 in London)
- 1 August – William Speirs Bruce, naturalist, polar scientist and oceanographer (died 1921)
- 9 August – Henrietta Elizabeth Marshall, writer of history for children (died 1941 in London)
- 26 August – Robert William Hamilton, colonial judge and Liberal politician (died 1944)

== Deaths ==
- 5 January – Alexander Smith, poet (born 1829)
- 16 January – Alexander Gibson, surgeon and forest conservator in India (born 1800)
- 9 February – John Campbell, surgeon (born 1784)
- 24 June – Horatio McCulloch, landscape painter (born 1806)

== The arts ==
- January – Clara Schumann and Joseph Joachim tour to Edinburgh and Glasgow.
- Ellen Johnston, "the 'factory girl'" publishes her Autobiography, Poems and Songs in Glasgow.

== See also ==
- Timeline of Scottish history
- 1867 in Ireland
