= 1950 in Scotland =

- Centuries: 18th; 19th; 20th; 21st
- Decades: 1930s; 1940s; 1950s; 1960s; 1970s
- See also: List of years in Scotland; Timeline of Scottish history 1950 in: The UK • Wales • Elsewhere; Scottish football: 1949–50 • 1950–51

Events from the year 1950 in Scotland.

== Incumbents ==
- Secretary of State for Scotland and Keeper of the Great Seal – Arthur Woodburn until 28 February; then Hector McNeil

=== Law officers ===
- Lord Advocate – John Thomas Wheatley
- Solicitor General for Scotland – Douglas Johnston

=== Judiciary ===
- Lord President of the Court of Session and Lord Justice General – Lord Cooper
- Lord Justice Clerk – Lord Thomson
- Chairman of the Scottish Land Court – Lord Gibson

== Events ==
- 14 February – first shipment of coal from Argyll Colliery (drift mine) in the reopened Machrihanish Coalfield to Belfast.
- 21 February – Clydebank-built Cunard liner RMS Aquitania arrives at the scrapyard in Faslane at the end of a 36-year career.
- August – first official Edinburgh Military Tattoo staged at Edinburgh Castle as part of the Edinburgh Festival.
- 22 August – 54-year-old William "Ned" Barnie becomes the first Scot to swim the English Channel, going on to complete 3 crossings.
- 8 September – Knockshinnoch disaster: 116 miners are trapped underground in a landslide at Knockshinnoch Castle colliery at New Cumnock in Ayrshire.
- 9 September – first miners are rescued from Knockshinnoch Castle colliery.
- 11 September – rescue operation from Knockshinnoch Castle colliery is completed, with all 116 miners saved.
- 18 October – the North of Scotland Hydro-Electric Board's Loch Sloy Hydro-Electric Scheme is inaugurated.
- 25 December – the Stone of Scone, the traditional coronation stone of Scottish monarchs, English monarchs and more recently British monarchs, is removed from London's Westminster Abbey by a group of four Scottish students led by Ian Hamilton, a future advocate, and taken to Scotland.
- St. Margaret's Hospice in Clydebank, the first modern hospice in Scotland, is begun by the Sisters of Charity.

== Births ==
- 5 January – William Sweeney, composer
- 21 January – Seona Reid, arts administrator
- 27 February – Annabel MacNicoll Goldie, Baroness Goldie, leader of Scottish Conservatives 2005-2011 and Life peer
- 10 March – Ted McKenna, rock drummer (The Sensational Alex Harvey Band) (died 2019)
- 22 March – Jocky Wilson, darts player (died 2012)
- 30 March – Robbie Coltrane, actor and comedian (died 2022)
- 31 March – William Blair, judge and financial lawyer
- 26 April – Sir Nairn Hutchison Fulton Wilson, dentistry professor
- 1 May – Malcolm James Mackenzie, footballer
- 6 May – Robbie McIntosh, funk drummer (Average White Band) (died 1974)
- 9 May – Murray Elder, politician (died 2023)
- 12 May – Helena Kennedy, lawyer
- 27 May – Alex Gray, crime novelist
- 8 June – Ann Marie Di Mambro, playwright and screenwriter
- 16 June – Alistair Moffat, cultural figure
- 20 June – Rita Rae, Lady Rae, judge
- 21 June – Enn Reitel, actor
- 23 July – Stewart Milne, businessman
- 8 September – Ian Davidson, politician
- 18 September – Jock McFadyen, painter
- 29 October – James Dillon, composer
- 7 November – Lindsay Duncan, actress
- 3 December – Angus Glennie, Lord Glennie, judge
- Brian Whittingham, writer, editor and lecturer on creative writing (died 2022)

== Deaths ==
- 15 January – George Livingstone, footballer (born 1876)
- 26 February – Harry Lauder, entertainer (born 1870)
- 17 March – Adam McKinlay, Labour politician (born 1887)
- 30 March – Joe Yule, comedian and actor (born 1892)
- 9 May – Charles Alexander Stevenson, lighthouse engineer (born 1855)
- 10 August – James Drever, psychologist (born 1873)
- 14 September – Alexander Livingstone, Liberal politician (born 1880)

== See also ==
- 1950 in Northern Ireland
