= 1955 in Scotland =

- Centuries: 18th; 19th; 20th; 21st
- Decades: 1930s; 1940s; 1950s; 1960s; 1970s
- See also: List of years in Scotland; Timeline of Scottish history 1955 in: The UK • Wales • Elsewhere; Scottish football: 1954–55 • 1955–56; 1955 in Scottish television

Events from the year 1955 in Scotland.

== Incumbents ==
- Secretary of State for Scotland and Keeper of the Great Seal – James Stuart

=== Law officers ===
- Lord Advocate – James Latham Clyde until January; then William Rankine Milligan
- Solicitor General for Scotland – William Rankine Milligan until January; then William Grant

=== Judiciary ===
- Lord President of the Court of Session and Lord Justice General – Lord Clyde
- Lord Justice Clerk – Lord Thomson
- Chairman of the Scottish Land Court – Lord Gibson

== Events ==
- 1955 – Dounreay Nuclear Power Development Establishment founded with the primary aim to develop Dounreay as the site for testing previously untried fast breeder reactor technology.
- 24 February – a big freeze across the UK results in many roads being blocked with snow; Caithness is practically cut off. The Royal Air Force works to deliver food and medical supplies to the worst affected areas.
- 21 March – American evangelist Billy Graham begins a seven-week Scottish crusade at the Kelvin Hall, Glasgow.
- 1 April – the South of Scotland Electricity Board is formed by merger.
- 23 April – the Scottish Cup Final is broadcast live on television for the first time. Clyde F.C. draw 1–1 with Celtic, winning the replay 1–0.
- 11 May – Monica Jackson and Betty Stark of the Scottish Women's Himalayan Expedition reach the top of the then unclimbed Gyzlaen Peak during the first women's expedition to the Himalayas.
- 19 May – Greenock Coin Hoard found.
- 27 May – United Kingdom general election: In Scotland, as throughout the UK as a whole, the Conservatives have a majority of seats.
- 25 June – the Scottish Aviation Twin Pioneer STOL transport aircraft, built at Prestwick, first flies.
- 30 June – two Hawker Sea Hawk jet fighters flying from RNAS Lossiemouth independently crash into the North Sea; one pilot is killed.
- 25–27 July – 'Operation Sandcastle': The first load of deteriorating captured Nazi German bombs filled with Tabun (nerve agent) is shipped from Cairnryan on the SS Empire Claire for scuttling in the Atlantic Ocean.
- 30 September – first electricity supply to the isolated railway community at Riccarton Junction.
- 10 November – a major fire in Edinburgh destroys the footwear warehouse of C. W. Carr Aitkman in Jeffrey Street.
- 11 November – a second major fire in Edinburgh largely destroys the C&A fashion store in Princes Street.
- 9 December – Cumbernauld is designated a New town.
- 14 December – RMS Carinthia is launched at John Brown & Company's shipyard on Clydebank for the Cunard Line's Canadian service.
- The collection of the world's first Museum of Childhood is established on Edinburgh's Royal Mile (initially at Lady Stair’s House) by optician Patrick Murray.
- Archaeological excavations on St Ninian's Isle begin.

== Births ==
- 18 January – Robin Wales, Labour politician, mayor of the London Borough of Newham
- 3 February – Kirsty Wark, television presenter
- 19 March – John Burnside, writer
- 31 March – Angus Young, rock musician
- 23 April – Allan Forsyth, footballer
- 2 May – Willie Miller, footballer
- 5 May – John Stroyan, Anglican bishop
- 14 May – Alasdair Fraser, fiddler
- 4 June – Val McDermid, crime novelist
- 13 June – Alan Hansen, footballer and television presenter
- 1 July – Candia McWilliam, fiction writer
- 8 July – Douglas Flint, banker
- 12 July – Robin Robertson, poet, novelist and editor
- 25 August – John McGeoch guitarist (died 2004 in England)
- 11 October – Sally Magnusson, journalist and broadcast presenter
- 12 October – Aggie MacKenzie, television presenter
- 28 October – Jeff Stewart, actor
- 12 November – Les McKeown, pop-rock singer (died 2021)
- 22 November – Mary Macmaster, harpist
- 2 December – Janice Galloway, writer
- 6 December – Anne Begg, Labour politician
- 23 December – Carol Ann Duffy, poet

== Deaths ==
- 21 February – Sir Henry Wade, surgeon (born 1876)
- 26 February – Agnes Mure Mackenzie, writer and historian (born 1891)
- 3 March – Lewis Spence, writer and folklorist (born 1874)
- 11 March – Sir Alexander Fleming, bacteriologist, recipient of the Nobel Prize in Physiology or Medicine (born 1881; died in London)
- 22 April – Herbert MacNair, artist (born 1868)
- 11 October – Hector McNeil, politician (born 1907)
- Mary Newbery Sturrock, artist and designer (born 1890)
- Salvador Ysart, glassblower (born 1878 in Barcelona)

== The arts ==
- Robin Jenkins's novel The Cone Gatherers is published.
- Sandy MacMillan, Thomas Limond and Ross Taylor's Scots language nursery rhyme collection Bairnsangs is published, as by Sandy Thomas Ross.
- Edith Anne Robertson's Scots language poetry collections Voices frae the city o trees; and ither voices frae nearbye and Poems Frae the Suddron O Walter De La Mare Made Ower Intil Scots are published.

== See also ==
- 1955 in Northern Ireland
