= 1874 in Scotland =

- Centuries: 17th; 18th; 19th; 20th; 21st
- Decades: 1850s; 1860s; 1870s; 1880s; 1890s
- See also: List of years in Scotland; Timeline of Scottish history 1874 in: The UK • Wales • Elsewhere; Scottish football: 1873–74 • 1874–75

Events from the year 1874 in Scotland.

== Incumbents ==
=== Law officers ===
- Lord Advocate – George Young until February; then Edward Strathearn Gordon
- Solicitor General for Scotland – Andrew Rutherfurd-Clark; then John Millar; then William Watson

=== Judiciary ===
- Lord President of the Court of Session and Lord Justice General – Lord Glencorse
- Lord Justice Clerk – Lord Moncreiff

== Events ==
- 17 January – Victoria Swing Bridge in Leith completed, the longest swing bridge in Britain at this date.
- 27 January – Bo'ness Junction rail crash near Falkirk on the North British Railway: 16 killed in a collision.
- 27 February – four crew of Stonehaven life-boat lost on service.
- 5 March – in the general election, former Scottish coal miner Alexander Macdonald (Lib–Lab) is elected for the English seat of Stafford, among the first Members of Parliament from a working class background.
- 21 March – the first ever final of the Scottish Cup is won by Queen's Park F.C. who beat Clydesdale 2–0.
- 21 May – foundation stone of St Mary's Cathedral, Edinburgh (Episcopal) laid by Walter Montagu Douglas Scott, Duke of Buccleuch.
- 28 July – the Sutherland and Caithness Railway is opened through to Wick and Thurso, completing the Highland Railway system to the far north and causing cessation of Britain's last mail coach.
- 7 August – Church Patronage (Scotland) Act 1874 abolishes patronage in the appointment of ministers to the Church of Scotland.
- Bernera Riot: Islanders of Great Bernera successfully resist Clearances.
- Coulburn Lobnitz & Company establish the shipbuilding business that will become known as Lobnitz in Renfrew.
- Joseph Russell, Anderson Rodger and William Lithgow establish the shipbuilding business that will become Lithgows in Port Glasgow.
- W. B. Thompson establishes the business that will become the Caledon Shipbuilding & Engineering Company in Dundee.
- Broomhall Castle built.
- Association football teams Heart of Midlothian F.C. (in Edinburgh), Greenock Morton F.C. and Hamilton Academical F.C. are founded.

== Births ==
- 20 February – Mary Garden, operatic soprano (died 1967)
- 23 February – Hugh S. Roberton, choirmaster (died 1952)
- 9 March – John Duncan Fergusson, artist (died 1961)
- 9 June – Launceston Elliot, weightlifter, first British Olympic champion, born in British India (died 1930 in Australia)
- 6 November – Katharine Stewart-Murray, Duchess of Atholl, née Ramsay, "Red Duchess", politician and humanitarian (died 1960)
- 25 November – Lewis Spence, writer and folklorist (died 1955)

== Deaths ==
- 24 January – Adam Black, publisher (born 1784)
- 12 April (probable date) – Ellen Johnston, "the factory girl", power loom weaver and poet (born c. 1835)
- 31 July – Cosmo Innes, lawyer and antiquary (born 1798)
- 6 August – Patrick Fairbairn, minister and theologian (born 1805)

== The arts ==
- 11 August – Stirling Smith Museum and Art Gallery opens as The Smith Institute in Stirling under the bequest of painter Thomas Stuart Smith (died 1869).
- Sveinbjörn Sveinbjörnsson, resident in New Town, Edinburgh, writes the tune that becomes the national anthem of Iceland, "Lofsöngur".

== See also ==
- Timeline of Scottish history
- 1874 in Ireland
