= 1952 in Scotland =

- Centuries: 18th; 19th; 20th; 21st
- Decades: 1930s; 1940s; 1950s; 1960s; 1970s
- See also: List of years in Scotland; Timeline of Scottish history 1952 in: The UK • Wales • Elsewhere; Scottish football: 1951–52 • 1952–53; 1952 in Scottish television

Events from the year 1952 in Scotland.

== Incumbents ==
- Secretary of State for Scotland and Keeper of the Great Seal – James Stuart

=== Law officers ===
- Lord Advocate – James Latham Clyde
- Solicitor General for Scotland – William Rankine Milligan

=== Judiciary ===
- Lord President of the Court of Session and Lord Justice General – Lord Cooper
- Lord Justice Clerk – Lord Thomson
- Chairman of the Scottish Land Court – Lord Gibson

== Events ==
- 6 February – Prince Charles (now Charles III) becomes Duke of Rothesay upon his mother's accession to the throne.
- 14 March – BBC TV Service Scotland launches (with a display by the Royal Scottish Country Dance Society), using the Kirk o'Shotts transmitting station (main transmitters into service 17 August).
- 27 May – First visit of the Queen to her home at Balmoral Castle as monarch; her first residence at Holyroodhouse Palace since her accession begins on 25 June.
- June
  - Reindeer reintroduced to the Cairngorms.
  - The last two miles of the Black Devon river disappear into old coal mine workings.
- 27 September – Commando Memorial near Spean Bridge unveiled.
- 29 September – John Cobb is killed on Loch Ness attempting to break the world water speed record in the jet speedboat Crusader.
- 29 November – "Pillar Box War": First GPO pillar box of the present reign to be erected in Scotland, on the Inch housing estate in Edinburgh, is attacked in protest at its bearing the Royal Cipher of Elizabeth II, the regnal number being considered historically incorrect in Scotland.
- 5 December – Ness, Lewis, selected for influenza vaccine trials.
- 10 December – Caithness Education Committee rejects a plan to issue pupils with a book entitled ABC Guide to the Coronation because it contains only English history.
- Castle of Mey in Caithness purchased for restoration by the newly-widowed Queen Elizabeth The Queen Mother.
- Strathpeffer spa baths complex demolished.

== Births ==
- 12 February – Hugh Henry, Labour politician and Member of the Scottish Parliament for Paisley South from 1999
- 8 March – Bill Speirs, STUC General Secretary 1998–2006 (died 2009)
- 2 May – Isla St Clair, born Isabella Margaret Dyce, singer, actress and television presenter
- 3 May – Allan Wells, Olympic champion athlete
- 10 May – Thomas Hamilton, spree killer, perpetrator of Dunblane school massacre (suicide 1996)
- 14 May – David Byrne, pop musician
- 29 May – Gerry Gow, footballer (died 2016)
- 12 June – Oliver Knussen, composer (died 2018)
- 26 June – Gordon McQueen, international footballer
- 6 August – David McLetchie, Conservative MSP (died 2013)
- 21 September – Jock Scot, born John Leslie, performance poet (died 2016)
- 12 November – Stuart Cosgrove, journalist, broadcaster and television executive
- C. J. Sansom, crime novelist

== Deaths ==
- 23 February – Sir James Lithgow, 1st Baronet, industrialist (born 1883)
- 31 May – Thomas Cook, Labour party politician and MP for Dundee since 1945 (born 1908)
- 7 September – Marion Gilchrist, pioneering medical doctor (born 1864)
- 7 October – Sir Hugh S. Roberton, choirmaster (born 1874)
- William Roughead, lawyer and criminologist (born 1870)

== The arts ==
- 23 June – Salvador Dalí's new painting Christ of Saint John of the Cross goes on display at the Kelvingrove Art Gallery and Museum in Glasgow, an acquisition by its director, Tom Honeyman, which is controversial at this time.
- Poetry magazine Lines Review is founded by Callum Macdonald in Edinburgh.
- Queens Theatre, Glasgow, destroyed by fire.

== See also ==
- 1952 in Northern Ireland
