= 1954 in Scotland =

- Centuries: 18th; 19th; 20th; 21st
- Decades: 1930s; 1940s; 1950s; 1960s; 1970s
- See also: List of years in Scotland; Timeline of Scottish history 1954 in: The UK • Wales • Elsewhere; Scottish football: 1953–54 • 1954–55; 1954 in Scottish television

Events from the year 1954 in Scotland.

== Incumbents ==
- Secretary of State for Scotland and Keeper of the Great Seal – James Stuart

=== Law officers ===
- Lord Advocate – James Latham Clyde
- Solicitor General for Scotland – William Rankine Milligan

=== Judiciary ===
- Lord President of the Court of Session and Lord Justice General – Lord Cooper until 23 December; then Lord Clyde
- Lord Justice Clerk – Lord Thomson
- Chairman of the Scottish Land Court – Lord Gibson

== Events ==
- 28 January – John Thomas Wheatley appointed as a Senator of the College of Justice.
- 12 February – United Kingdom Atomic Energy Authority founded; the body in this same year will decide on Dounreay as a 'safe' site for its fast breeder reactor tests.
- 17 February – RMS Saxonia is launched at John Brown & Company's shipyard on Clydebank for the Cunard Line's Canadian service.
- March – Scottish Journal of Political Economy first published.
- 16 March – Major fire damages Skerryvore lighthouse.
- 27 April – Clyde F.C. beat Celtic 1 – 0 in the replayed final of the Scottish Cup.
- 12 May – Work on construction of Seafield Colliery at Kirkcaldy begins.
- 4 July – Fourteen years of rationing in the UK during and following World War II comes to an end, when meat officially comes off ration.
- July – Work on construction of Ravenscraig steelworks is authorised.
- 19 July – United Kingdom Atomic Energy Authority established by the Atomic Energy Act "to produce, use and dispose of atomic energy and carry out research into any matters therewith".
- 3 September – The National Trust for Scotland acquires Fair Isle from George Waterston.
- 23 October – Heart of Midlothian F.C. beats Motherwell 4–2 to win the Scottish League Cup.
- 23 November – opening of Walsh trial, to determine whether Douglas Walsh of Dumbarton, a Jehovah's Witness pioneer, has the same right as an ordained religious minister in Scotland to be exempted from national service.
- 25 December – 1954 Prestwick air disaster: BOAC Boeing 377 Stratocruiser G-ALSA crashes on landing at Prestwick Airport from London in poor visibility, killing 28.
- Asymmetric footbridge over Gala Water in Galashiels opened.
- Osprey recolonise Scotland.

== Births ==
- 5 January – Myra Nimmo, long jumper
- 27 January – Iain McColl, actor (died 2013)
- 15 February – John McAslan, architect
- 16 February – Iain Banks, novelist (died 2013)
- 22 February – Ian Stark, equestrian
- 8 March – David Wilkie, swimmer (born in Colombo; died 2024)
- 9 March – Jim Stewart, footballer
- 14 March – David Taylor, football administrator, joint General Secretary of UEFA
- 23 March – Mary Fee, Labour Party politician
- 9 April – Iain Duncan Smith, Conservative Party leader, MP and government minister
- 28 April – Tom McCabe, Labour Party politician, MSP (1999–2011) and government minister (died 2015)
- 5 May – Brian Souter, businessman and founder of Stagecoach Group
- 11 May – Judith Weir, composer
- 28 June – A. A. Gill, newspaper critic (died 2016 in London)
- 25 July – Sheena McDonal, journalist and broadcaster
- 2 August – Ken MacLeod, science fiction writer
- 5 August – Allan Wilson, Labour Party politician, MSP (1999–2007)
- 16 August – George Galloway, politician, former MP and founder of the Respect Party
- 25 August – Jim Wallace, Liberal Democrat politician (died 2026)
- 26 August – David Martin, Labour Party politician, Member of the European Parliament for Scotland
- 11 September – Ian Anderson, footballer (died 2008)
- 28 September – Mike McCartney, footballer
- 16 October – Michael Forsyth, Baron Forsyth of Drumlean, Conservative Secretary of State for Scotland
- 19 October – Ken Stott, actor
- 16 November – Donald Runnicles, orchestral conductor
- 25 December – Annie Lennox, singer-songwriter, political activist and philanthropist
- 27 December – Joanna Strathdee, Scottish National Party politician (died 2015)
- 31 December – Alex Salmond, Scottish National Party First Minister of Scotland (2007–14) (died 2024)
- George McGavin, entomologist
- Gordon Murray, architect

== Deaths ==
- 11 February – Alexander Anderson, Labour Party politician and Member of Parliament 1947–54 (born 1888)
- 18 April – Helen Crawfurd, suffragette and communist activist (born 1877)
- 6 May – B. C. Forbes, financial journalist and author who founded Forbes Magazine in the United States (born 1880)
- 18 July – Thomas S. Tait, architect (born 1882)
- 12 November – Alex Smith, international footballer (born 1876)
- 22 November – Jimmy Gordon, footballer (born 1888)

== The arts ==
- George Mackay Brown's first book of poetry, The Storm, is published.
- Sorley MacLean's Scottish Gaelic poetry Hallaig is published in Gairm.
- Roddy McMillan's play All in Good Faith is presented at the Citizens Theatre, Glasgow.
- American photographer Paul Strand works in the Outer Hebrides.
- Alexander Trocchi's novel Young Adam is published.

== See also ==
- 1954 in Northern Ireland
