= 1949 in Scotland =

- Centuries: 18th; 19th; 20th; 21st
- Decades: 1920s; 1930s; 1940s; 1950s; 1960s
- See also: List of years in Scotland; Timeline of Scottish history 1949 in: The UK • Wales • Elsewhere; Scottish football: 1948–49 • 1949–50

Events from the year 1949 in Scotland.

== Incumbents ==
- Secretary of State for Scotland and Keeper of the Great Seal – Arthur Woodburn

=== Law officers ===
- Lord Advocate – John Thomas Wheatley
- Solicitor General for Scotland – Douglas Johnston

=== Judiciary ===
- Lord President of the Court of Session and Lord Justice General – Lord Cooper
- Lord Justice Clerk – Lord Thomson
- Chairman of the Scottish Land Court – Lord Gibson

== Events ==
- 3 April – Trolleybuses in Glasgow introduced.
- 1 May – Scottish Gas Board established.
- 4 May – Fire at Grafton's fashion store in Argyle Street, Glasgow, kills 13 young women.
- 24 July – People of Alyth march on Alyth Hill to assert their right of commonty over the land.
- October – The Scottish Covenant, calling for the establishment of a legislative parliament within the United Kingdom, is drawn up by John MacCormick.

=== Undated ===
- Wendy Wood founds the nationalist group, the Scottish Patriots
- The Law Society of Scotland is established.
- John Boyd Orr receives the Nobel Peace Prize.

== Births ==
- 15 January – Craig Pritchett, chess International Master
- 19 January – Lindsay Roy, educator and politician
- 23 January – Tom Forsyth, international footballer
- 25 January – Chris Lowe, BBC News presenter
- 2 February – Duncan Bannatyne, entrepreneur, philanthropist and author
- 9 February – Bernard Gallacher, golfer
- 26 February – Lynda Clark, judge and politician
- 6 March – Martin Buchan, international footballer
- 7 March – Malcolm Chisholm, Labour MSP
- 12 March – Glenn Chandler playwright, novelist, producer and theatre director
- 13 March – Trevor Sorbie, hairdresser
- 8 April – Alex Fergusson, Presiding Officer of the Scottish Parliament 2007–2011 (died 2018)
- 25 April – Alexis Jay, social worker
- 21 May – Andrew Neil, print and television journalist
- 4 June – Lou Macari, international footballer and manager
- 21 June – Derek Emslie, Lord Kingarth, judge
- 4 July – Alex Miller, footballer and manager
- 6 August – Erich Schaedler, footballer (suicide 1985)
- 8 August – Benny Young, actor
- 11 August – Ian Charleson, actor (died 1990)
- 12 August – Mark Knopfler, musician with Dire Straits
- 20 August – Stewart Houston, international footballer and manager
- 9 September – John Reid, music manager
- 18 September – Alastair Campbell, Lord Bracadale, judge
- 22 September – Jimmy Bone, footballer and manager
- 29 September – Adrian Elrick, international footballer representing New Zealand
- 8 October – Hamish Stuart, guitarist, bassist, singer, composer and record producer
- 22 November - Paul le Page Barnett science fiction writer, with pen name John Grant (died 2020)
- 25 November – Isabel Hilton, journalist and broadcaster
- 28 December – Hilton McRae, actor
- Alison Kinnaird, glass sculptor and harpist

== Deaths ==
- 2 January – Sir Victor Fortune, British Army officer (born 1883)
- 9 January – Edward Baird, artist (born 1904)
- 12 April
  - W. Lindsay Cable, artist and illustrator (born 1900)
  - John Wallace, Liberal MP (born 1868)
- 3 August – Jessie M. King, illustrator and designer (born 1875)
- 6 August – David Taylor, footballer and manager (born 1883)
- 7 October - Arthur Pillans Laurie, chemist (born 1861)
- 22 October – Alex McDonald, footballer (born 1878)
- Joseph Lee, poet and journalist (born 1876)

== Sport ==
- Summer – The Ba game of Duns revived.

== See also ==
- 1949 in Northern Ireland
