= 1947 in Scotland =

- Centuries: 18th; 19th; 20th; 21st
- Decades: 1920s; 1930s; 1940s; 1950s; 1960s
- See also: List of years in Scotland; Timeline of Scottish history 1947 in: The UK • Wales • Elsewhere; Scottish football: 1946–47 • 1947–48

Events from the year 1947 in Scotland.

== Incumbents ==
- Secretary of State for Scotland and Keeper of the Great Seal – Joseph Westwood until 7 October; then Arthur Woodburn

=== Law officers ===
- Lord Advocate – George Reid Thomson until 13 October; then John Thomas Wheatley
- Solicitor General for Scotland – Daniel Blades until March; then John Thomas Wheatley until October; then Douglas Johnston

=== Judiciary ===
- Lord President of the Court of Session and Lord Justice General – Lord Normand until 6 January; then Lord Cooper
- Lord Justice Clerk – Lord Cooper, then Lord Thomson
- Chairman of the Scottish Land Court – Lord Gibson

== Events ==
- 10 January – Burngrange mining disaster: An explosion in an oil shale mine at West Calder kills 15.
- 29 March – Butlin's Ayr holiday camp opened to the public.
- 6 May – East Kilbride designated as the first New Town in Scotland under powers of the New Towns Act 1946.
- 28 May – Prohibition ends in Wick, Caithness; it also ends this year in Lerwick.
- 16 June – PS Waverley makes her maiden voyage on the Firth of Clyde.
- 9 July – Glasgow Zoo opens at Calderpark, Baillieston.
- 18 July – the first official night horse racing meeting in Britain is held at Hamilton Park Racecourse.
- 27–28 July – English endurance swimmer Tom Blower becomes the first person to swim the North Channel, from Donaghadee in Northern Ireland to Portpatrick.
- 31 July – the Local Government (Scotland) Act 1947 (10 & 11 Geo. 6. c. 43) receives royal assent.
- 1 October – local government is reorganised in line with the Local Government (Scotland) Act 1947.
- 25 October – Walter Donaldson becomes the first Scottish player to win the World Snooker Championship.
- 30 October – RMS Caronia is launched at John Brown & Company's shipyard on Clydebank as a cruise ship for the Cunard Line.
- 5 November – the Scottish Aviation Pioneer STOL aircraft, built at Prestwick, first flies.
- Archaeological excavations at Cairnpapple Hill in West Lothian are begun by Stuart Piggott.
- The Golden Wonder brand of potato crisp is originated by bakery owner William Alexander of Stockbridge, Edinburgh.
- Robert Wiseman Dairies founded by Robert Wiseman with a horse and cart used for doorstep deliveries in East Kilbride.
- Luing cattle first bred on the island of Luing by the Cadzow brothers.

== Births ==
- 4 February – John Campbell Brown, astronomer (died 2019)
- 11 February – Derek Shulman, progressive rock musician (Gentle Giant)
- 18 February – Jeannie Fisher, actress
- 7 March – Helen Eadie, politician (died 2013)
- 11 March – David Stewart, goalkeeper (died 2018)
- 15 March – Tony Osoba, actor
- 24 March – Archie Gemmill, footballer
- 26 March – Ian Tough, comedian with The Krankies
- April – Alastair Hay, toxicologist
- 4 April – Christine De Luca, poet and advocate for the Shetland dialect
- 16 April – Gerry Rafferty, singer-songwriter (died 2011)
- 21 April – Robert Black, serial killer (died 2016 in Northern Ireland)
- 8 May – John Reid, Labour Party MP, minister and Home Secretary
- 10 May – Laurie Macmillan, radio newsreader and continuity announcer (died 2001)
- 13 May – Rab Noakes, folk singer-songwriter (died 2022)
- 16 May – Janette Tough, comedienne with The Krankies
- 18 May – Richard Gordon, writer of science fiction and travel guides (died 2001 in China)
- 31 May – Junior Campbell, born William Campbell Jr, pop musician (Marmalade)
- 29 June – Michael Carter, actor
- 11 July – Drummond Bone, academic and Byron scholar
- 10 August – Ian Anderson, rock musician (Jethro Tull)
- 8 September – Morris Pert, composer, drummer/percussionist, and pianist (died 2010)
- 21 September – Pamela So Scottish Chinese multimedia artist and photographer (died 2010)
- 27 September – Barbara Dickson, singer
- 27 September – Denis Lawson, actor and director
- 20 November – Aneka (Mary Sandeman), pop and folk singer
- 26 December – Liz Lochhead, poet and playwright
- Alistair Beaton, writer, political satirist
- Sheena Blackhall, poet and fiction writer
- Ajahn Candasiri, Theravāda Buddhist nun, co-founder of Chithurst Buddhist Monastery
- John Muir, footballer (died 2018)
- Alan Spence, poet, playwright and fiction writer

== Deaths ==
- 14 March – Archibald Main, ecclesiastical historian (born 1876)
- 25 April – John Crichton-Stuart, 4th Marquess of Bute, architectural conservationist (born 1881 in London)
- 28 November – James Miller, architect and artist (born 1860)
- 1 December – John Fraser, surgeon and academic (born 1885)
- 14 December – Will Fyffe, music hall entertainer (born 1885; fell from hotel room window)

== The arts ==
- 30 January – Ena Lamont Stewart's domestic drama Men Should Weep, written in Glasgow patter, is premiered by the Glasgow Unity Theatre at the Athenaeum Theatre.
- 13 March – the Lerner and Loewe musical Brigadoon opens on Broadway.
- 24 August – first Edinburgh Festival of the Arts opens.
- 31 August – the first Edinburgh International Film Festival opens at the Playhouse Cinema, presented by the Edinburgh Film Guild as part of the Edinburgh Festival of the Arts. Originally specialising in documentaries, it will become the world's oldest continuously running film festival.
- Compton Mackenzie's comic novel Whisky Galore is published.
- Naomi Mitchison's historical novel The Bull Calves is published.
- Sydney Goodsir Smith's comic novel Carotid Cornucopius: caird of the Cannon Gait and voyeur of the Outlook Touer. His splores, cantraips, wisdoms, houghmagandies, peribibulatiouns and all kinna abstrapulous junketings and ongoings abowt the high toun of Edenberg, capitule of boney Sotland [sic?] is published in Glasgow.
- The Makar's Club in Edinburgh issues a Scots Style Sheet setting out a consensus for the spelling of Modern Scots.

== See also ==
- 1947 in Northern Ireland
- 1947 in Wales
