= 1870 in Scotland =

- Centuries: 17th; 18th; 19th; 20th; 21st
- Decades: 1850s; 1860s; 1870s; 1880s; 1890s
- See also: List of years in Scotland; Timeline of Scottish history 1870 in: The UK • Wales • Elsewhere

Events from the year 1870 in Scotland.

== Incumbents ==
=== Law officers ===
- Lord Advocate – George Young
- Solicitor General for Scotland – Andrew Rutherfurd-Clark

=== Judiciary ===
- Lord President of the Court of Session and Lord Justice General – Lord Glencorse
- Lord Justice Clerk – Lord Moncreiff

== Events ==
- 6 July – Chartered Institute of Bankers in Scotland founded, the world's oldest such organisation.
- 1 August – Burgh Customs (Scotland) Act enables burghs to abolish petty customs (local duties and tolls) and substitute local rates for them.
- 26 September – George Watson's Hospital in Edinburgh reopens as reconstituted as a fee-paying day school, George Watson's College Schools for Boys.
- 4 October – first non-public hanging in Scotland: George Chalmers of Fraserburgh, 45, is hanged in Perth county jail by the London hangman William Calcraft for the murder of a toll-keeper at Braco.
- November – the University of Glasgow moves from the Old College in High Street to a new campus and main building (designed by George Gilbert Scott) at Gilmorehill in the West End of Glasgow.
- 30 November – the first unofficial international Association football match, England v Scotland, takes place under the approval of the Football Association (FA) at The Oval, London. The Scotland team is selected by the FA from players in the London area with Scottish connections.
- Esplanade at Rothesay, Bute, completed.
- Mormond Hill White Stag hill figure created in Aberdeenshire.
- James Lamont & Co are established as ship repairers at Greenock.

== Births ==
- 14 March – Henry Gray, surgeon (died 1938 in Canada)
- 24 June – James Logan, international footballer (died 1896)
- 4 August – Harry Lauder, entertainer (died 1950)
- 18 October – J. H. Curle, mining engineer, traveller, writer, eugenicist and philatelist (died 1942 in Canada)
- William Roughead, lawyer and criminologist (died 1952)

== Deaths ==
- 15 February – William Burn, architect, pioneer of the Scottish Baronial style (born 1789)
- 23 February – Edward Maitland, Lord Barcaple, judge (born 1803)
- 26 February – John Duncan, theologian and Hebraist (born 1796)
- 24 April – Alexander Handyside Ritchie, sculptor (born 1804)
- 17 May – David Octavius Hill, artist and photographer (born 1802)
- 27 May – James Smart, chief constable (born 1804)
- 26 October – Thomas Anderson, botanist (born 1832)
- Uilleam Mac Dhun Lèibhe (William Livingston), Gaelic poet (born 1808)

== See also ==
- Timeline of Scottish history
- 1870 in Ireland
