= 1944 in Scotland =

- Centuries: 18th; 19th; 20th; 21st
- Decades: 1920s; 1930s; 1940s; 1950s; 1960s
- See also: List of years in Scotland; Timeline of Scottish history 1944 in: The UK • England • Wales • Elsewhere; Scottish football: 1943–44 • 1944–45

Events from the year 1944 in Scotland.

== Incumbents ==
- Secretary of State for Scotland and Keeper of the Great Seal – Tom Johnston

=== Law officers ===
- Lord Advocate – James Reid
- Solicitor General for Scotland – Sir David King Murray

=== Judiciary ===
- Lord President of the Court of Session and Lord Justice General – Lord Normand
- Lord Justice Clerk – Lord Cooper
- Chairman of the Scottish Land Court – Lord Gibson

== Events ==
- 17 February – Kirkcaldy Burghs by-election is held. The Scottish National Party candidate Douglas Young comes close to winning the seat (which is retained by Labour candidate, Thomas Hubbard).
- 6 June – World War II: Normandy landings – Brigadier Lord Lovat leads the 1st Special Service Brigade ashore with his personal piper Bill Millin.
- 26–30 June – World War II: the 15th (Scottish) Infantry Division spearhead Operation Epsom, also known as the First Battle of the Odon, during the Battle of Normandy.
- 17 July – Church of Scotland missionary Jane Haining is killed in Auschwitz concentration camp following her pastoral work among Hungarian Jewish children.
- September – Churchill Barriers on Orkney completed, together with the Italian Chapel on Lamb Holm.
- 9 November – The House of the Binns (near Linlithgow) becomes the first estate house given to the National Trust for Scotland (by Eleanor Dalyell).
- 12 November – World War II: sinking of the German battleship Tirpitz at Tromsø by Lancaster bombers of No. 9 and 617 Squadrons flying from RAF Lossiemouth.
- 30 November – HMS Vanguard (23) is launched at John Brown & Company's shipyard at Clydebank by the Princess Elizabeth. The Royal Navy's largest, fastest and last battleship, she was laid down in October 1941 and will be in commission from 1946 to 1960.
- December – 97 Italians tunnel out of a prisoner-of-war camp at Doonfoot but are quickly recaptured.

== Births ==
- 23 January – John McCluskey, boxer (died 2015)
- 31 January – Robin Murray, psychiatrist
- 19 February – Ron Mathewson, jazz double bassist and bass guitarist (died 2020)
- 25 February – Campbell Armstrong (born Thomas Campbell Black), novelist (died 2013 in Ireland)
- 2 March – Stuart McGugan, actor
- 11 March – Graham Lyle, singer-songwriter
- 23 March – Maoilios Caimbeul (Myles Campbell) writer of poetry, prose and children's literature in Scottish Gaelic
- 19 April – Andrew Welsh, Scottish National Party politician (died 2021)
- 3 May – Carl Forgione, actor (died 1998 in England)
- 13 May – Vivien Heilbron, actress
- 17 May – Jimmy Boyle, sculptor, writer and murderer
- 5 June – Jim Brogan, footballer (died 2018)
- 3 July – Paul Young, actor
- 7 July – George Logan, entertainer (died 2023 in France)
- 8 August – Robert Smith, Baron Smith of Kelvin, businessman, chairman of the Green Investment Bank
- 11 August – Ian McDiarmid, actor
- 17 August – Bobby Murdoch, international footballer (died 2001)
- 22 August – Tom Leonard, poet (died 2018)
- 13 September – Leslie Harvey, rock guitarist (died 1972)
- 21 September – Susan Fleetwood, stage, film and television actress (died 1995 in England)
- 21 September – Christopher Harvie, historian and Scottish National Party politician
- 23 September – Eric Bogle, folk singer-songwriter in Australia
- 30 September – Jimmy Johnstone, international footballer (died 2006)
- 3 October – Harry Hood, footballer (died 2019)
- 17 November – Malcolm Bruce, Liberal politician
- 23 November – Christopher Rush, writer
- 28 November – James Smillie, actor and singer
- 12 December – Kenneth Cranham, actor
- 29 December – Gilbert Adair, novelist, poet, film critic and journalist (died 2011 in London)
- Alison Fell, poet and novelist
- Shena Mackay, novelist

== Deaths ==
- 8 February – John Watson, advocate and sheriff, Solicitor General for Scotland 1929–31 (born 1883; dies on train to Scotland)
- 29 February - Durward Lely, opera singer and actor (born 1852)
- 16 March – David Prain, botanist (born 1857)
- 23 June - J. Storer Clouston, author and historian (born 1870 in Cumberland)
- 5 July – Robert William Hamilton, Liberal politician and MP (born 1867)
- 6 July - Alexander Lorne Campbell, architect (born 1871)
- 11 July – Sir Daniel Macaulay Stevenson, shipbroker, Liberal politician and philanthropist (born 1851)
- 11 August – William Fife, yacht designer (born 1857)
- 16 August – Walter Robberds, Bishop of Brechin and Primus of the Scottish Episcopal Church (born 1863 in the British Raj)
- 27 September – David Dougal Williams, painter (born 1888 in England)

== See also ==
- Timeline of Scottish history
- 1944 in Northern Ireland
