= 1866 in Scotland =

- Centuries: 17th; 18th; 19th; 20th; 21st
- Decades: 1840s; 1850s; 1860s; 1870s; 1880s
- See also: List of years in Scotland; Timeline of Scottish history 1866 in: The UK • Wales • Elsewhere

Events from the year 1866 in Scotland.

== Incumbents ==
=== Law officers ===
- Lord Advocate – James Moncreiff until July; then George Patton
- Solicitor General for Scotland – George Young; then Edward Strathearn Gordon

=== Judiciary ===
- Lord President of the Court of Session and Lord Justice General – Lord Colonsay
- Lord Justice Clerk – Lord Glenalmond

== Events ==
- January? – The Oban Times begins publication as a weekly newspaper.
- 31 March – The Caithness Courier begins publication as a newspaper in Thurso.
- 2 April – Thomas Carlyle gives his inaugural address as Rector of the University of Edinburgh.
- 19 May – the first part of the Edinburgh Museum of Science and Art, a predecessor of the National Museum of Scotland, is opened.
- June – City of Glasgow Improvements Act provides for urban renewal.
- 11 August – Lodge Kelburne No. 459 founded in Millport, Cumbrae.
- 16 September – Willie Park wins his third Open Championship, at Prestwick Golf Club.
- 17 October – Ballater railway station opens to the public as the terminus of the Deeside Railway; on 20 & 24 September the Prince and Princess of Wales were able to use the station.
- "Cox's Stack" or "Lumb", the 282 ft (86 m)-tall chimney of Cox Brothers' Camperdown Works (a jute mill) and a notable landmark of Dundee, is completed.
- Duncraig Castle near Plockton is built for Alexander Matheson by Alexander Ross.
- The Denholm Group is established by John Denholm of Greenock as a shipping agency.
- Samurai Yamao Yōzō, one of the Chōshū Five, begins 2 years studying marine engineering in Glasgow.
- The last Kirkcaldy whaler, The Brilliant, is sold to Peterhead.

== Births ==
- 5 February – Arthur Keith, anatomist and anthropologist (died 1955)
- 6 May – Murdoch Macdonald, civil engineer and Liberal politician (died 1957)
- 6 June – John Stirling-Maxwell, Conservative politician and philanthropist (died 1956)
- 19 July – John Duncan, symbolist painter (died 1945)
- 12 October – Ramsay MacDonald, first Labour Prime Minister of the United Kingdom (died 1937)
- 4 November – Jane Findlater, novelist (died 1946)
- 30 November – Robert Broom, paleontologist (died 1951 in South Africa)
- Dorothea Ruggles-Brise, née Stewart-Murray, collector of traditional Scottish music (died 1937)
- Archie Simpson, golfer and course designer (died 1955 in the United States)

== Deaths ==
- 14 March – Alexander Morison, physician and psychiatrist (born 1779)
- 4 April – William Dick, founder of Edinburgh Veterinary College (born 1793)
- 29 June – George Thomson, shipbuilder (born 1815)
- 21 August – Benjamin Blyth, civil engineer (born 1819)
- 10 September – Charles Maclaren, journalist and geologist, co-founder of The Scotsman newspaper (born 1782)
- 24 December – Robert Dick, natural historian (born 1811)

== The arts ==
- David Octavius Hill's painting The First General Assembly of the Free Church of Scotland, Signing the Act of Separation and Deed of Demission at Tanfield, Edinburgh 23 May 1843 is completed.

== See also ==
- Timeline of Scottish history
- 1866 in Ireland
