= 1872 in Scotland =

- Centuries: 17th; 18th; 19th; 20th; 21st
- Decades: 1850s; 1860s; 1870s; 1880s; 1890s
- See also: List of years in Scotland; Timeline of Scottish history 1872 in: The UK • Wales • Elsewhere; Scottish football: 1871–72 • 1872–73

Events from the year 1872 in Scotland.

== Incumbents ==
=== Law officers ===
- Lord Advocate – George Young
- Solicitor General for Scotland – Andrew Rutherfurd-Clark

=== Judiciary ===
- Lord President of the Court of Session and Lord Justice General – Lord Glencorse
- Lord Justice Clerk – Lord Moncreiff

== Events ==
- May
  - Rangers F.C., founded in March as an Association football club in Glasgow by brothers Moses and Peter McNeil, Peter Campbell and William McBeath, play their first ever game on the public pitches of Glasgow Green, a goalless draw against Callander
  - John Kibble's conservatory is dismantled at Coulport for re-erection in Glasgow Botanic Gardens
- 9 July – Tradeston Flour Mills explosion in Glasgow kills 18
- 10 August – First Education (Scotland) Act passed, providing compulsory English-language education for all aged 5–13
- 19 August – First horse trams in Glasgow, running from St George's Cross to Eglinton Toll
- 2 October – Kirtlebridge rail crash at Kirtlebridge station on the Caledonian Railway in Dumfries and Galloway: 12 killed in a collision
- 30 November – Scotland v England, the first FIFA-recognized international football match, takes place at Hamilton Crescent in Glasgow; the result is a goalless draw
- 12 December – Third Lanark A.C. is established as the Association football team of the Third Lanarkshire Rifle Volunteers
- December – Wick Harbour breakwater is washed away in a storm
- Dhu Heartach lighthouse is first lit
- David Colville & Sons open their Dalzell Steel and Iron Works at Motherwell
- Guard Bridge paper mills established near Leuchars
- The Egyptian Halls, a pioneering iron-framed commercial building in Glasgow designed by Alexander Thomson, is completed
- The last Thurso Castle is built
- Clydebank High School established
- First hospital built on the site at Govan (Glasgow) that will become Queen Elizabeth University Hospital
- The Northern Psalter and Hymn Tune Book edited by William Carnie is published in Aberdeen containing Jessie Seymour Irvine's setting of Psalm 23, "Crimond"
- The Scottish Gaelic magazine Féillire is first published as Almanac Gàilig air son 1872 in Inverness
- The Shetland Times is first published in Lerwick
- Other Association football clubs established this year include Ayr Thistle, Clydesdale, Dumbarton and Renton

== Births ==
- 12 February – Alexander Gibb, civil engineer (died 1958)
- 5 May – Norman Smith, philosopher (died 1958)
- 13 June – Chrystal Macmillan, mathematician, suffragist, politician, barrister and pacifist (died 1937)
- 2 October – Thomas Hunter, Unionist Party MP for Perth (1935–45) (died 1953)

== Deaths ==
- 14 January – Greyfriars Bobby, faithful Skye Terrier dog
- 27 February – John McLeod Campbell, minister and theologian (born 1800)
- 16 June – Norman Macleod, Church of Scotland minister (born 1812)
- 20 August – William Miller, poet (born 1810)
- 28 November – Mary Somerville, scientist (born 1780)
- 24 December – William John Macquorn Rankine, pioneer of thermodynamics (born 1820)

== See also ==
- Timeline of Scottish history
- 1872 in Ireland
