= 1871 in the United Kingdom =

Events from the year 1871 in the United Kingdom.

== Incumbents ==
- Monarch – Victoria
- Prime Minister – William Ewart Gladstone (Liberal)

== Events ==
- 1 January – disestablishment of the Church of Ireland by the Irish Church Act 1869 comes into effect.
- 26 January – Rugby Football Union established in London.
- 10 February – Great Gale in the North Sea: 28 ships wrecked and total fatalities are estimated at over fifty, including six crew of Bridlington life-boat Harbinger.
- 7 March – the first rugby international (played in Edinburgh) results in a 4–1 win by Scotland over England.
- 13 March – Britain, Russia, France, Austria, Turkey and Italy agree to abrogate the 1856 Treaty of Paris ending Black Sea neutrality.
- 21 March – John Campbell, Marquess of Lorne marries Princess Louise, a daughter of Queen Victoria, at Windsor; she is the first legitimate daughter of a British monarch to marry a subject since 1515.
- 29 March – the Royal Albert Hall is opened by Queen Victoria; it incorporates a grand organ by Henry Willis & Sons, the world's largest at this time.
- 2 April – census in the United Kingdom, the first to record economic and mental status.
- 11 April - Funeral of Prince Alexander John of Wales at St Mary Magdalene Church, Sandringham
- 12 April – Durham Miners' Gala first held.
- 24 April – murder of Jane Clouson, a servant girl, in Eltham; her probable murderer is acquitted.
- 11 May – the first trial in the Tichborne case begins in the Court of Common Pleas (England).
- 15 May – cross-dressers Boulton and Park are found not guilty of conspiracy to commit sodomy in London at the Court of Queen's Bench. The proceedings include the first recorded use of the word "drag" in an entertainment context.
- 26 May – Parliament passes the Bank Holidays Act creating four annual bank holidays (five in Scotland).
- 29 May – first bank holiday held on Whit Monday.
- 6 June – Smith v Hughes, a landmark case in English contract law, is decided in the Court of Queen's Bench, allowing an objective approach to interpretation of the parties' conduct when entering into a contract.
- 18 June – the Universities Tests Act removes restrictions which have previously limited access to Oxford, Cambridge and Durham universities to members of the Church of England (although the Congregation for the Propagation of the Faith at this time discourages attendance by Catholics).
- 29 June – trade unions are legalised by the Trade Union Act but the Criminal Law Amendment Act criminalises coercion in a trade dispute.
- 20 July – C. W. Alcock proposes that 'a Challenge Cup should be established in connection with the Association', giving birth to the FA Cup in football.
- August – Nine Hours Strike begins on Tyneside in favour of a shorter working day; employers capitulate after 14 weeks.
- 11 August – Stowmarket Guncotton Explosion kills 28.
- 17 August – Regulation of the Forces Act centralises and regularises control of the British Army as part of the Cardwell Reforms, creating a structure of regional Brigade (Regimental) Districts.
- 21 August
  - Prevention of Crimes Act provides for photography of criminals.
  - Pedlars Act requires pedlars to be licensed.
- 1 November – sale of commissions in the British Army abolished as part of the Cardwell Reforms. Pensions are made available for officers.
- 6 November – MP Sir Charles Dilke, 2nd Baronet, delivers a speech critical of the expense of maintaining the monarchy to a radical audience in Newcastle upon Tyne.
- 7 November – the London–Australia telegraph cable is brought ashore at Darwin.
- 10 November – Welsh-born journalist Henry Morton Stanley locates missing Scottish explorer and missionary, Dr. David Livingstone in Ujiji, near Lake Tanganyika and greets him saying "Dr. Livingstone, I presume?" (according to his later account).
- 17 November – George Biddell Airy presents his discovery that astronomical aberration is independent of the local medium.
- 25 November – first performance of The Bells starring Henry Irving at the Lyceum Theatre, London.
- 25 December – Reading Football Club formed.
- 26 December – the Victorian burlesque Thespis, first of the Gilbert and Sullivan light opera collaborations, premières at the Gaiety Theatre, London. It does modestly well, but the two composers will not again work together until 1875.

=== Undated ===
- The Martini–Henry rifle enters service with the British Army.
- Thomas Lipton opens his first grocery shop, in Glasgow.
- Southall Football Club formed in Southall in the London Borough of Ealing, England.
- In rugby union, Neath RFC and Streatham-Croydon RFC are founded.
- Teddington Hockey Club formed, the world's first.
- The native-bred red kite becomes extinct in England.

== Publications ==
- William Alexander's realist novel Johnny Gib of Gushetneuk (serialised in Aberdeen Free Press 1869–70).
- William Black's novel A Daughter of Heth.
- Henry Ramsden Bramley and John Stainer's hymnal Christmas Carols, Old and New, 2nd series.
- Edward Bulwer-Lytton's (anonymous) novel The Coming Race.
- Lewis Carroll's children's novel Through the Looking-Glass.
- George Tomkyns Chesney's (anonymous) invasion novella The Battle of Dorking.
- Charles Darwin's work The Descent of Man.
- George Eliot's novel Middlemarch (begins serialisation).
- Anthony Trollope's novel The Eustace Diamonds (serialisation).
- Edward Burnett Tylor's anthropological study Primitive Culture.

== Births ==
- 1 January – Montagu Toller, cricketer and lawyer (died 1948)
- 17 January – David Beatty, 1st Earl Beatty, admiral (died 1936)
- 18 February – Harry Brearley, inventor (died 1948)
- 19 March – Schofield Haigh, cricketer (died 1921)
- 28 March – R. Silyn Roberts, Welsh socialist and pacifist writer (died 1930)
- 6 April – Prince Alexander John of Wales, British Prince (died 7 April)
- 16 April – John Millington Synge, Irish dramatist (died 1909)
- 11 June – Walter Cowan, admiral (died 1956)
- 3 July – W. H. Davies, poet (died 1940)
- 4 July – Hubert Cecil Booth, engineer and inventor (died 1955)
- 15 August – Arthur Tansley, botanist and ecologist (died 1955)
- 6 September – Montagu Norman, Governor of the Bank of England (died 1950)
- 10 September
  - Thomas Adams, Scottish-born urban planner (died 1940)
  - Charles Collett, Great Western Railway chief mechanical engineer (died 1952)
- 24 September – Lottie Dod, athlete (died 1960)
- 10 October – Wickham Steed, newspaper editor (died 1956)
- 12 October – Lilias Margaret Frances, Countess Bathurst, née Borthwick, newspaper proprietor (died 1965)
- 25 October – John Gough, general, Victoria Cross recipient (died 1915)
- 3 November – Albert Goldthorpe, rugby league footballer (died 1943)
- Elfrida Rathbone, educationalist (died 1940)

== Deaths ==
- 11 January – Paul Bedford, comedian (born c.1792)
- 18 January – Sir George Hayter, English portrait painter (born 1792)
- 22 February – Sir Charles Shaw, Scottish-born army officer and police commissioner (born 1795)
- 17 March – Robert Chambers, Scottish publisher and geologist (born 1802)
- 18 March – Augustus De Morgan, mathematician (born 1806)
- 7 April – Prince Alexander John of Wales (born 6 April)
- 20 April – Samuel Halkett, Scottish librarian (born 1814)
- 30 April – Jane Clouson, murder victim (born 1854)
- 4 May – Pablo Fanque, black circus owner, popularized by The Beatles in song (born 1810)
- 11 May – Sir John Herschel, astronomer (born 1792)
- 9 June – Anna Atkins, botanist and pioneer photographer (born 1799)
- 14 July – Michael Loam, Cornish engineer, pioneer of the man engine (born 1797)
- 1 September – Sir James Pennethorne, architect (born 1801)
- 6 September – James Burns, Scottish shipowner (born 1789)
- 7 September – William Prowting Roberts, Chartist lawyer (born 1806)
- 10 September – Ugo Foscolo, Italian poet (born 1821)
- 21 September – Charlotte Elliott, hymnwriter (born 1789)
- 7 October – Sir John Burgoyne, field marshal (born 1782)
- 18 October – Charles Babbage, mathematician and inventor (born 1791)
- 22 October – Sir Roderick Murchison, Scottish-born geologist (born 1792)
- 11 November – William Lonsdale, geologist (born 1794)
- 7 December – Lavinia Ryves, claimant to membership of the royal family (born 1797)
- 14 December – George Hudson, railway financier (born 1800)
- 28 December – John Henry Pratt, clergyman and mathematician (born 1809)
