= 1873 in Scotland =

- Centuries: 17th; 18th; 19th; 20th; 21st
- Decades: 1850s; 1860s; 1870s; 1880s; 1890s
- See also: List of years in Scotland; Timeline of Scottish history 1873 in: The UK • Wales • Elsewhere; Scottish football: 1872–73 • 1873–74

Events from the year 1873 in Scotland.

== Incumbents ==
=== Law officers ===
- Lord Advocate – George Young
- Solicitor General for Scotland – Andrew Rutherfurd-Clark

=== Judiciary ===
- Lord President of the Court of Session and Lord Justice General – Lord Glencorse
- Lord Justice Clerk – Lord Moncreiff

== Events ==
- March – Robert Fleming & Co. founded by Robert Fleming in Dundee as a series of investment trusts including the Scottish American Investment Company (co-founded with William Menzies)
- 3 March – the Scottish Rugby Union is formed as the Scottish Football Union
- 13 March – the Scottish Football Association is formed, the world's second national football association
- 15 November – statue to Greyfriars Bobby erected in Edinburgh
- Edinburgh Evening News first published
- Lexicographer James Murray publishes Dialect of the Southern Counties of Scotland
- George and James Weir move their new pump manufacturing and general engineering business, predecessor of the Weir Group, to Glasgow

== Births ==
- 8 April – James Drever, psychologist (died 1950)
- 13 April – James Salmon, architect (died 1924)
- 6 July – George Aitken Clark Hutchison, Scottish Unionist MP for Midlothian and Peebles Northern (1922–23, 1924–28) (died 1928)

== Deaths ==
- 24 February – Thomas Guthrie, Free Church preacher and philanthropist (born 1803)
- 8 March – Robert William Thomson, engineer, inventor of the bicycle tyre (born 1822)
- 1 May – David Livingstone, pioneer medical missionary (born 1813)
- 2 October – John Cunningham, architect (born 1799)
- 27 October – Janet Hamilton, poet (born 1795)
- Hugh Fraser, retailer (born 1815)

== See also ==
- Timeline of Scottish history
- 1873 in Ireland
