= 1869 in Scotland =

- Centuries: 17th; 18th; 19th; 20th; 21st
- Decades: 1840s; 1850s; 1860s; 1870s; 1880s
- See also: List of years in Scotland; Timeline of Scottish history 1869 in: The UK • Wales • Elsewhere

Events from the year 1869 in Scotland.

== Incumbents ==
=== Law officers ===
- Lord Advocate – James Moncreiff until October; then George Young
- Solicitor General for Scotland – George Young; then Andrew Rutherfurd-Clark

=== Judiciary ===
- Lord President of the Court of Session and Lord Justice General – Lord Glencorse
- Lord Justice Clerk – Lord Moncreiff

== Events ==
- 5 January – Scotland's oldest professional Association football team, Kilmarnock F.C., is founded.
- 13 January – the story magazine The People's Friend is first published in Dundee; it will continue to be published by D. C. Thomson & Co. more than 140 years later.
- 27 March – the Japanese ironclad Ryūjō is launched at Alexander Hall and Company's shipyard in Aberdeen.
- 13 September – the Solway Junction Railway is opened for iron ore traffic, including a 1-mile 8 chain (1.8 km) viaduct across the Solway Firth.
- October – the 'Edinburgh Seven', led by Sophia Jex-Blake, start to attend lectures at the University of Edinburgh Medical School, the first women in the UK to do so (although they will not be allowed to take degrees there).
- 22 November – the clipper ship Cutty Sark is launched in Dumbarton, one of the last clippers built and the only one to survive in the UK.
- The Congregation of the Most Holy Redeemer first takes up residence at St Mary's Monastery, Kinnoull, Perth (built 1866–8), the first Roman Catholic monastery established in Scotland since the Reformation.
- Inverness Cathedral (Scottish Episcopal Church) is opened for worship as the first new Protestant cathedral to be completed in Great Britain since the Reformation.
- An Episcopal chapel from St Andrews is moved stone by stone in fishing boats to Buckhaven and re-erected there.
- The Caledonian Brewery is established in Shandon, Edinburgh, by George Lorimer and Robert Clark.
- Thomas McCall of Kilmarnock builds two velocipedes driven by levers to cranks on the rear wheel.
- Glasgow University Rugby Football Club is founded.

== Births ==
- 14 January – Dennis Eadie, character actor (died 1928)
- 26 January – George Douglas Brown, novelist (died 1902)
- 14 February – Charles Wilson, physicist, Nobel Prize laureate (died 1959)
- 17 April – Robert Robertson, chemist (died 1949)
- 11 June – Walford Bodie, stage magician (died 1939)

== Deaths ==
- 11 July – William Jerdan, journalist (born 1782)
- 20 September – George Patton, Lord Glenalmond, judge (born 1803; suicide)

== See also ==
- Timeline of Scottish history
- 1869 in Ireland
