= 1953 in Scottish television =

This is a list of events in Scottish television from 1953.

== Events ==
- 2 June – The Coronation of Queen Elizabeth II is televised in the United Kingdom. Sales of TV sets rise sharply in the weeks leading up to the event. It is also one of the earliest broadcasts to be deliberately recorded for posterity. It still exists in its entirety today.

== Births ==
- 11 January - John Sessions, actor (died 2020)
- 27 February - Gavin Esler, author and BBC television journalist
- 7 June - Dougie Donnelly, television broadcaster
- 23 June – John Stahl, actor (died 2022)
- 31 August - Jimmy McKenna, actor
- 8 September - John McGlynn, actor

== See also ==
- 1953 in Scotland
