= 1952 in Scottish television =

This is a list of events in Scottish television from 1952.

== Events ==
- 14 March - BBC One Scotland launches (with a display by the Royal Scottish Country Dance Society), using the Kirk o'Shotts transmitting station.
- 17 August - Main television transmitters at Kirk o'Shotts transmitting station come into service.

== Births ==
- 12 November - Stuart Cosgrove, journalist, broadcaster and television executive

== See also ==
- 1952 in Scotland
