= 1955 in Scottish television =

This is a list of events in Scottish television from 1955.

== Events ==
- 23 April - The Scottish Cup Final is broadcast live on television for the first time. Clyde F.C. draw 1-1 with Celtic F.C., winning the replay 1-0.
- 17 May - Sir Anthony Eden hosts a ground-breaking television election programme for the Conservative Party, the first broadcast of its type. The 30 minute programme features government ministers pitted against newspaper editors.
- 4 September - Newsreaders appear "in vision" for the first time.
- 25 December - After being on radio since 1932, the Royal Christmas Message is broadcast on British television for the first time, in sound only at 3.00pm. The first visual Christmas message is shown in 1957.

== Births ==
- 3 February - Kirsty Wark, journalist and television presenter
- 13 June - Alan Hansen, footballer and BBC television sports presenter
- 2 October - Aggie MacKenzie, television presenter
- 28 October - Jeff Stewart, actor

== See also ==
- 1955 in Scotland
