= 1864 in Scotland =

- Centuries: 17th; 18th; 19th; 20th; 21st
- Decades: 1840s; 1850s; 1860s; 1870s; 1880s
- See also: List of years in Scotland; Timeline of Scottish history 1864 in: The UK • Wales • Elsewhere

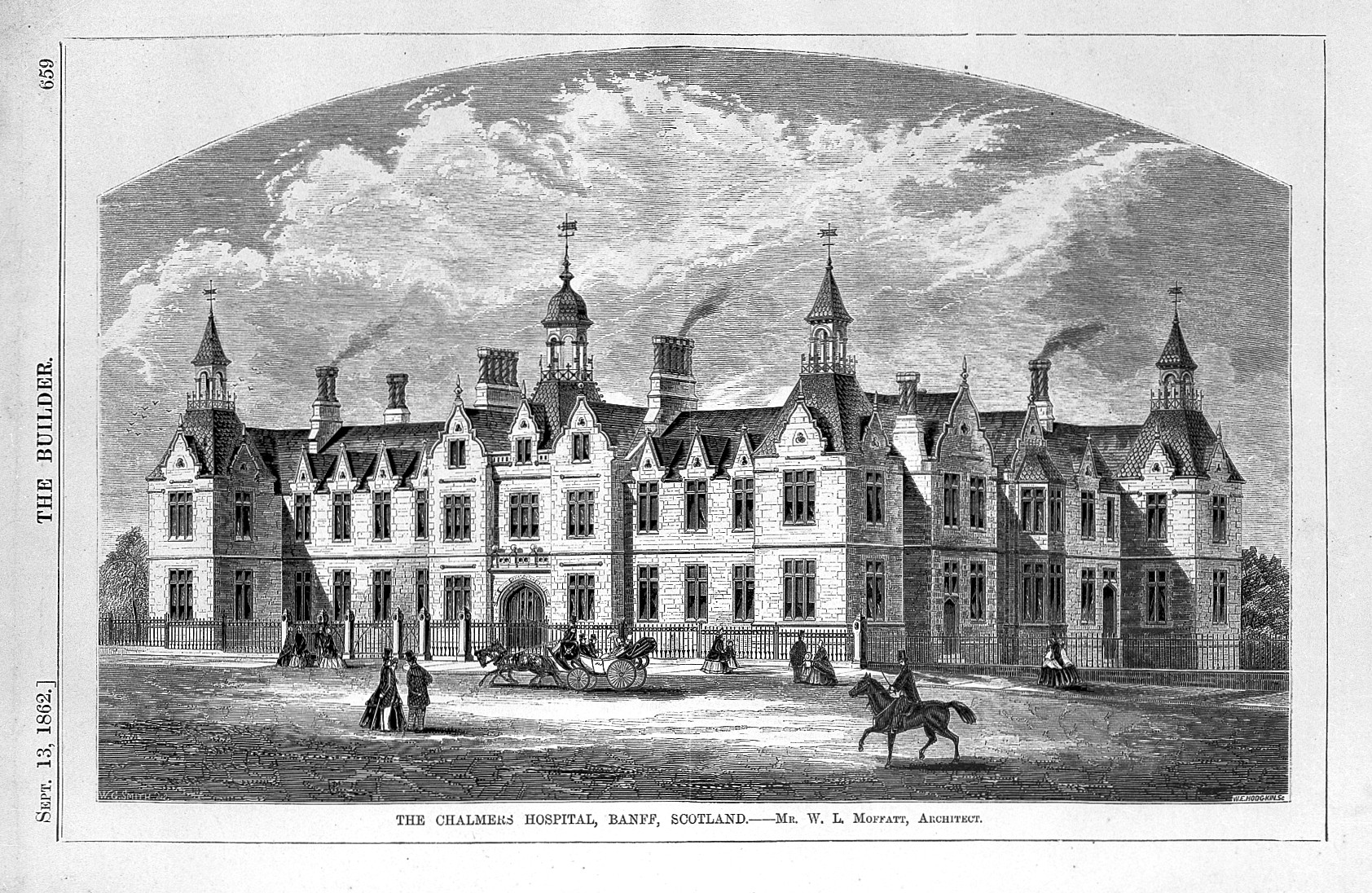
Chalmers Hospital

Events from the year 1864 in Scotland.

== Incumbents ==
=== Law officers ===
- Lord Advocate – James Moncreiff
- Solicitor General for Scotland – George Young

=== Judiciary ===
- Lord President of the Court of Session and Lord Justice General – Lord Colonsay
- Lord Justice Clerk – Lord Glenalmond

== Events ==
- 21 June – last public execution in Edinburgh – George Bryce, the Ratho murderer.
- 19 July – Chalmers Hospital opened in Banff, Aberdeenshire.
- 2 September – the first Ottoman ironclad Osmaniye is launched by Robert Napier and Sons on the River Clyde.
- 8 December – James Clerk Maxwell presents his paper A Dynamical Theory of the Electromagnetic Field to the Royal Society, treating light as an electromagnetic wave.
- Hall, Russell & Company established as marine engineers in Aberdeen.
- The National Bank of Scotland becomes the first Scottish bank to open an office in London.
- Historian John Hill Burton publishes The Scot Abroad.

== Births ==
- 2 January – James Caird, shipowner (died 1954 in England)
- 17 January – David Torrence, film actor (died 1951)
- 4 February - Willie Park Jr., golf professional (died 1925 in Scotland)
- 5 February – Marion Gilchrist, medical doctor (died 1952)
- 6 February – John Henry Mackay, anarchist writer (died 1933 in Germany)
- 14 February – James Burns, shipowner (died 1919)
- 8 March – James Craig Annan, photographer (died 1946)
- 28 May – Jessie Newbery, née Rowat, embroiderer (died 1948 in England)
- 10 June – Ninian Comper, Gothic Revival architect (died 1960 in England)
- 1 October – Alexander Grant, biscuit manufacturer (died 1937)
- 7 October – Harrington Mann, painter (died 1937 in the United States)
- 31 October – Cosmo Gordon Lang, Archbishop of Canterbury (died 1945 in England)
- 4 November – Robert Lorimer, architect (died 1929)
- 13 December – John Quinton Pringle, painter (died 1925)

== Deaths ==
- 6 January – John Clements Wickham, explorer, naval officer, magistrate and administrator (born 1798)
- 1 June – Sir John Watson Gordon, portrait painter (born 1788)
- 6 August – Catherine Sinclair, novelist and children's writer (born 1800)
- 1 October – Ignatius Spencer, English priest (born 1799)

== See also ==
- Timeline of Scottish history
- 1864 in Ireland
