= 1953 in Scotland =

- Centuries: 18th; 19th; 20th; 21st
- Decades: 1930s; 1940s; 1950s; 1960s; 1970s
- See also: List of years in Scotland; Timeline of Scottish history 1953 in: The UK • Wales • Elsewhere; Scottish football: 1952–53 • 1953–54; 1953 in Scottish television

Events from the year 1953 in Scotland.

== Incumbents ==
- Secretary of State for Scotland and Keeper of the Great Seal – James Stuart

=== Law officers ===
- Lord Advocate – James Latham Clyde
- Solicitor General for Scotland – William Rankine Milligan

=== Judiciary ===
- Lord President of the Court of Session and Lord Justice General – Lord Cooper
- Lord Justice Clerk – Lord Thomson
- Chairman of the Scottish Land Court – Lord Gibson

== Events ==
- 30 January – The cargo vessel Clan MacQuarrie runs aground near Borve, Lewis in a storm; all 66 crew are rescued by breeches buoy the following morning.
- 31 January – The car ferry MV Princess Victoria, sailing from Stranraer to Larne in Northern Ireland, sinks in the Irish Sea in a storm killing 133 people on board. Fleetwood trawler Michael Griffiths sinks seven miles south of Barra Head with the loss of 13 crew.
- 9 February – Fraserburgh life-boat John and Charles Kennedy capsizes on service: six crew killed.
- 5 March – PS Maid of the Loch, the last full-size paddle steamer built in the UK, is launched on the River Clyde at A. & J. Inglis's Pointhouse Shipyard. On 25 May, she enters excursion service on Loch Lomond.
- c. March – New Bridge Street Bridge across Peterhead harbour completed, the last Scherzer rolling lift bridge erected by Sir William Arrol & Co. of Glasgow.
- 16 April – The Queen launches the Royal Yacht Britannia at John Brown & Company shipbuilders at Clydebank.
- 20 May – Celtic F.C. beat Hibernian 2-0 in the final of the Coronation Cup (football) at Hampden Park.
- 20 June – Most of the population of the island of Soay, Skye, moves to the Isle of Mull.
- 24 June – First state visit of Queen Elizabeth II to Scotland since her accession; the Honours of Scotland are carried before the monarch for the first time since 1822 and presented to her at St Giles' Cathedral, Edinburgh.
- 22 July – Great Bernera is connected to Lewis by Scotland's first prestressed concrete girder bridge.
- 8 August – The northbound Royal Scot train derails near Abington descending from Beattock Summit due to buckling of track caused by high temperature; 37 are injured.
- 27 October – Arbroath life-boat Robert Lindsay capsizes on service: six crew killed.
- Scottish law case of MacCormick v Lord Advocate decides that the right of Elizabeth II to so style herself in Scotland is a matter of royal prerogative.
- IBM establishes a manufacturing facility in Greenock.

== Births ==
- 1 January – Maureen Beattie, Irish-born actress
- 6 January – Malcolm Young, rock guitarist (died 2017 in Australia)
- 11 January – John Sessions, born John Gibb Marshall, actor and comedian (died 2020)
- 20 January – John Robertson, international footballer (died 2025)
- 27 February – Gavin Esler, television journalist
- 6 April – Patrick Doyle, film composer
- 6 May
  - Tony Blair, Prime Minister of the United Kingdom, 1997–2007
  - Graeme Souness, international footballer and manager
- 19 May – Patrick Hodge, lawyer, a Justice of the Supreme Court of the United Kingdom
- 21 May – Jim Devine, Labour politician
- 22 May – Andy Nisbet, mountaineer (died 2019)
- 23 May – Ronald Frame, fiction writer
- 7 June
  - Colin Boyd, Baron Boyd of Duncansby, lawyer and judge
  - Dougie Donnelly, television presenter
- 23 June – John Stahl, actor (died 2022)
- 24 August – Sam Torrance, golfer
- 31 August – Jimmy McKenna, actor
- 8 September – John McGlynn, actor
- 10 September – John Thurso, born John Sinclair, businessman and Liberal Democrat politician
- 28 September – Jim Diamond, pop singer-songwriter (died 2015)
- 21 October – Eric Faulkner, pop musician
- 4 November – Derek Johnstone, international footballer
- 12 November – Calum MacDonald, Celtic rock songwriter and percussionist
- 22 December – Gregor Fisher, actor and comedian
- Steven Campbell, figurative painter (died 2007)
- Ian Read, businessman

== Deaths ==
- 19 March – Thomas Hunter, Unionist Party politician and Member of Parliament (MP) for Perth (born 1872)
- 1 June – Alex James, international footballer (born 1901)
- 23 July – Sir Thomas Jaffrey, actuary (born 1861)
- 30 September – Lewis Fry Richardson, mathematical physicist (born 1881 in England)

== The arts ==
- April – Comedy film Laxdale Hall is released.
- Lewis Spence's Collected Poems are published in Edinburgh.

== See also ==
- 1953 in Northern Ireland
