= 1954 in Scottish television =

This is a list of events in Scottish television from 1954,

== Events ==
- 11 January - The first weather forecast with an in-vision presenter is televised in the UK. The first weather presenter was George Cowling.
- 5 July - First actual news bulletin, News and Newsreel, aired on BBC One, replacing Television Newsreel.
- 30 July - The Television Act 1954 is given Royal Assent. It authorises the setting up of the infrastructure for British commercial television.

== Births ==
19 October - Ken Stott, actor

== See also ==
- 1953 in Scotland
