= Frank McPhee =

Scottish gangland boss

Frank McPhee (21 October 1948 – 10 May 2000) was a long-time Greater Glasgow–based crime boss.

== Early life ==
McPhee was born in Lennoxtown, Glasgow on 21 October 1948. His mother came from an Irish Traveller family, but adopted a settled life more typical of "Buffers", or non-Travellers, as her family started to grow. McPhee and his five sisters knew how to speak Shelta, but he was also embarrassed when his mother spoke it in front of his friends.

His parents briefly moved the family to Edinburgh, before relocating to Maryhill, Glasgow, where McPhee lived for the rest of his life.

== Criminal career ==
McPhee was reported to have built his "underworld empire" on drugs and armed robbery. He was jailed in 1978 for five years for robbery and served another five in 1986 for an armed raid. In 1990, he was cleared of involvement in a £42,000 armed raid but was sentenced to eight years for his involvement in a £200,000 drug deal in 1992. In 1997, McPhee was prosecuted for the killing of William "Worm" Toye, who was found stabbed to death in Perth Prison, where McPhee was serving time. A jury found the case not proven. In 1998, three months after his release from prison, McPhee was accused of the murder by strangulation of Chris McGrory, but the case was again found not proven.

== Death ==
In May 2000, a single shot to was fired into McPhee's head from a .22 ACZ Brno sniper rifle with a telescopic sight. McPhee was killed instantly outside his home in Guthrie Street, Maryhill, Glasgow, 500 yards from Maryhill Police Station, and in full view of his 11-year old son. It was variously reported that a sniper had waited for him after he had been chased through Glasgow by another gunman and that only one gunman was involved.

It was reported that a £5,000 'contract' had been put out on his life. As the same model of sniper rifle used as the murder weapon was also routinely used by terrorist organizations for assassinations during the Troubles, Glasgow police were said to be investigating whether McPhee, who'd built longstanding friendships and close 'business' dealings with both Irish republican and Ulster Loyalist paramilitaries, may have tried to muscle in on the drug trade controlled by former terrorists based in Northern Ireland. He had been responsible for negotiating between dealers in the North and the rest of England. Police also probed his links with a "plot to make Scotland the dogfighting capital of Europe"; and have also probed claims that McPhee had been killed by either the Lyons Crime Family or the Daniel Crime Family, the two main Glasgow organized crime families that have taken his place.
