= Angus Glennie, Lord Glennie =

The Right Honourable Lord Glennie

Senator of the College of Justice
- In office 2005–2020
- Nominated by: Jack McConnell; As First Minister
- Monarch: Elizabeth II

Personal details
- Born: Angus James Scott Glennie; 3 December 1950 (age 75)
- Education: Trinity Hall, Cambridge
- Profession: Advocate

Angus James Scott Glennie, Lord Glennie, PC (born 3 December 1950) was a Senator of the College of Justice, and Principal Commercial Judge in the Court of Session, in Scotland.

== Early life ==
Glennie was educated at Sherborne School in Dorset, and at Trinity Hall, Cambridge (M.A. Hons.). He was called to the Bar at Lincoln's Inn in 1974. He was appointed a Bencher in 2007.

== Legal career ==
Whilst at the English Bar, Glennie worked mainly in commercial and international arbitration before the Commercial Court and Court of Appeal. He took silk there in 1991, and the following year was admitted to the Faculty of Advocates. Again, he practised mostly in commercial law, but also worked in other areas, such as judicial review and reparation. He was appointed Queen's Counsel in Scotland in 1998.

He was appointed to the Bench of the Court of Session and High Court of Justiciary in 2005, as a Senator of the College of Justice, with the judicial title, Lord Glennie. He worked originally as an Intellectual Property Judge, but became a Commercial Judge in 2007, and Principal Commercial Judge from January 2008. Following his Privy Council appointment on 11 July 2016, he was appointed to the 1st Division of the Inner House. He retired in December 2020 and subsequently became Chair of the Scottish Arbitration Centre.

He has served as an international commercial court judge for the Dubai International Financial Centre Court.

== See also ==
- List of Senators of the College of Justice
