= Allan Forsyth =

Scottish footballer (born 1955)

Personal information
- Date of birth: 23 April 1955 (age 71)
- Place of birth: Glasgow, Scotland
- Position: Defender

Youth career
- Larkhall Thistle

Senior career*
Years	Team	Apps	(Gls)
1974–1978	Dundee United	27	(2)
1978–1984	Raith Rovers	155	(9)
1984–1985	Dunfermline Athletic	38	(1)
1985–	Glenrothes		
Total		220	(12)

Managerial career
- Thornton Hibs
- * Club domestic league appearances and goals

Allan Forsyth (born 23 April 1955, in Glasgow) is a Scottish former footballer who played as a defender.

== Career ==
Forsyth began his professional career with Dundee United and made nearly thirty league appearances for The Terrors over a four-year spell. In 1978, Forsyth became Raith Rovers' record signing in a £12,000 deal and played in over 150 league games for Rovers before moving to Dunfermline Athletic in 1984. His final professional spell brought nearly 40 league matches before moving to junior football in 1985 with Glenrothes. After retiring from playing, Forsyth had a spell in management with Thornton Hibs before leaving football to work in a furniture factory in Kirkcaldy.
