= Braeside, Greenock =

Coordinates: 55°56′17″N 4°49′11″W

Braeside is a neighbourhood situated on the far west side of Greenock, in Inverclyde, Scotland.

It has one primary schools in its vicinity, Aileymill, a high school Inverclyde Academy and used to have a special needs school for handicapped children, Glenburn which for a while was ear marked to be demolished and become the site of Scotland's new national female prison HMP Inverclyde however this is no longer happening. It has a pub which is very much a village pub "the burns lounge " known as the burns .Like many of Greenock's estates it is named after the farm which once stood on its site.

During drainage work in 1955 a cow horn was found, about 4 feet (1.2 m) below ground level. It contained around sixty Scottish coins dating from 1543 to around 1570, implying that the hoard was buried in the mid-1570s. The earlier coins date from the reign of Mary, Queen of Scots, and testoons and other coins are from the reign of James VI of Scotland. The horn disintegrated, and while some of the coins were given to children and have not been traced, 20 coins were placed in the collection of the Royal Scottish Museum in Edinburgh, and 30 went to the McLean Museum in Greenock.
