= Douglas Ainslie =

Scottish poet, translator, critic and diplomat

Douglas Ainslie (1865 – 27 March 1948), was a Scottish poet, translator, critic and diplomat. He was born in Paris, France, and educated at Eton College and at Balliol and Exeter Colleges, Oxford. A contributor to The Yellow Book, he met and befriended Oscar Wilde at age twenty-one while an undergraduate at Oxford. He was also associated with other such notable figures as Aubrey Beardsley, Walter Pater and Marcel Proust. The first translator of the Italian philosopher Benedetto Croce into English, he also lectured on Hegel. He was identified as the "Dear Ainslie" recipient of twelve letters written by Arthur Conan Doyle in 1895 - 1896, which were auctioned by Christie's in 2004.

Ainslie was a Member of the Royal Asiatic Society of Great Britain and Ireland.

He also revered the Indian sage Sri Ramana Maharshi who taught the truth of Non-dualism ('Advaita") and visited him in 1935 at his ashram in Thiruvannamalai in Southern India.

== Ainslie as translator of Croce ==
Ainslie's cast of mind was literary rather than philosophical; and it is not entirely clear that he had the philosophical competence to translate Croce adequately. In a review of Ainslie's translation of Filosofia della practica. Economica ed etica (1909) (Philosophy of the Practical, Economic and Ethic, London : Macmillan, 1913), the Oxford philosopher, H.J. Paton (1887–1969, White's Professor of Moral Philosophy, 1937–52), wrote :

'Of the present translation we prefer to say as little as possible. Mr. Ainslie might have avoided some of his mistakes by consulting the readable, and on the whole accurate, French translation by Buriot and Jankelevitch. His own translation is not distinguished either by literary elegance or by philosophical understanding; it is not always clear or even intelligible; and it too often ignores both grammar and sense with results which cannot be considered altogether happy. To study Croce through its medium is like studying the face of a man in a concave mirror. One may derive some diversion from it, if one is acquainted with the original, but those who depend upon it for their only source of information will receive from it an impression not wholly devoid of perplexity.'

Equally critical is the assessment of another Oxford scholar, Geoffrey Mure (1893–1979, Warden of Merton College, Oxford, 1947–63), who refers to Croce's 1906 Ciò che è vivo e ciò che è morto della filosofia di Hegel (What is Living and What is Dead in the Philosophy of Hegel ?, London : Macmillan, 1915) as 'translated (very unreliably) by Douglas Ainslie'.

== Ainslie and R.G. Collingwood ==
In 1913 the Oxford philosopher and historian, R.G. Collingwood, translated Croce's La Filosofia di Giambattista Vico (The Philosophy of Giambattista Vico, London : Macmillan). He thus breached Ainslie's exclusive right of translation. To avoid legal action, Collingwood translated the second edition of Croce's Estetica come scienza dell'espressione e linguistica generale (Aesthetic as Science of Expression and General Linguistic), which was published under Ainslie's name in 1922. Ainslie had produced an incomplete translation of the first edition in 1909.

== Bibliography ==
- Escarlamonde and Other Poems (1893)
- John of Damascus (1901)
- Moments: Poems (1905)
- The Song of the Stewarts: Prelude (1909)
- Mirage: Poems (1911)
- Adventures Social and Literary (1922)
- Chosen Poems (1926)
- Pleasure (1938)
- The Conquest of Pleasure (1942)
