= 1865 in Scotland =

- Centuries: 17th; 18th; 19th; 20th; 21st
- Decades: 1840s; 1850s; 1860s; 1870s; 1880s
- See also: List of years in Scotland; Timeline of Scottish history 1865 in: The UK • Wales • Elsewhere

Events from the year 1865 in Scotland.

== Incumbents ==
=== Law officers ===
- Lord Advocate – James Moncreiff
- Solicitor General for Scotland – George Young

=== Judiciary ===
- Lord President of the Court of Session and Lord Justice General – Lord Colonsay
- Lord Justice Clerk – Lord Glenalmond

== Events ==
- 16 January – new fishing harbour at St Monans completed.
- 3 March – Thomas Sutherland founds the Hong Kong and Shanghai Banking Corporation.
- 28 July – English general practitioner Edward William Pritchard becomes the last person publicly hanged in Glasgow (on Glasgow Green), for poisoning his wife and mother-in-law in the city.
- 6 October – the iron cargo/passenger steamer Agamemnon is launched by Scotts Shipbuilding and Engineering Company at Greenock. Equipped with an efficient compound steam engine, she pioneers trade by steam to the Far East.
- 30–31 December – 24 vessels are wrecked around the Dubh Artach reef in a storm.
- 165 emigrants leave the island of Raasay for Australia.
- Joseph Lister begins to experiment with antiseptic surgery in Glasgow using carbolic acid.
- Fourth cholera pandemic reaches Scotland.
- James Clerk Maxwell (who this year moves back to the family home at Glenlair House) publishes A Dynamical Theory of the Electromagnetic Field.
- Amhuinnsuidhe Castle on Harris is built for Charles Murray, 7th Earl of Dunmore by David Bryce.

== Births ==
- 28 March – Mary Findlater, novelist (died 1963)
- 27 April – Archibald Leitch, architect, most famous for his work designing stadia throughout the British Isles (died 1939)
- 28 June – David Young Cameron, painter (died 1945)
- 17 October – Dugald Cowan, educationalist and Liberal politician (died 1933)
- 6 November – William Boog Leishman, military physician (died 1926)
- William Gillies, nationalist (died 1932)

== Deaths ==
- 18 January – James Beaumont Neilson, ironmaster (born 1792)
- 5 June – John Richardson, Royal Navy surgeon, naturalist and arctic explorer (born 1787)
- 4 August – William Edmondstoune Aytoun, poet, humorist and lawyer (born 1813)
- 19 October – Robert Crichton Wyllie, physician, businessman and Minister of Foreign Affairs in the Kingdom of Hawaii (born 1798)
- 23 December – Alan Stevenson, lighthouse designer (born 1807)

== The arts ==
- Thomas Faed's painting The Last of the Clan is first exhibited
- Gaelic poet William Livingston (Uilleam Macdhunleibhe)'s collection Duain agus Orain is published in Glasgow
- George MacDonald's novel Alec Forbes of Howglen is published

== See also ==
- Timeline of Scottish history
- 1865 in Ireland
