= Féillire =

Annual Scottish Gaelic magazine

Am Féillire
- Frequency: Annually with gaps
- Founded: 1872
- Final issue: 1938
- Country: Scotland
- Based in: Inverness
- Language: Scottish Gaelic

Am Féillire (Scottish Gaelic pronunciation: [əm ˈfeːʎəɾʲə]) was an annual magazine in Scottish Gaelic that was first published in 1872 under the name Almanac Gàilig air son 1872 in Inverness by J. Noble and ran to 44 pages.

It appeared again the following year under the name Am Féillire. Further editions appeared in 1875, 1900 and then annually until 1908 and, following a long gap, finally in 1938. It varied in length, having up to 96 pages.
