= Pamela So =

Scottish Chinese multimedia artist and photographer

- Born: 21 September 1947; Glasgow
- Died: 17 February 2010 (aged 62); Irvine
- Education: Glasgow School of Art
- Known for: Multimedia art, photography

Pamela Hung So (21 September 1947 - 17 February 2010) was a Scottish Chinese multimedia artist and photographer who used her art to explore her cultural background and her family history.

== Early life ==
Pamela's parents were Evelyn Yih (a telephonist) and Pak So (a surgeon), and the family were one of the first three Chinese families living in Glasgow. So's grandmother was amongst a group who had walked to Europe from the Hubei province in the first part of the twentieth century, in order to give acrobatic performances and sell paper flowers. In her early career, So gained a Geography degree and worked as a librarian.

== Art career ==
So studied in the Environmental Art department of Glasgow School of Art as a mature student, graduating in 1998. So's art was often influenced by her Chinese heritage, with some pieces incorporating family photographs and films made by her father, and later expanded to explore the relationship between Britain and China and the wider theme of postcolonialism. The 2000 work, 'Love is a many splendoured thing', used Chinese dolls to examine sexual politics. A 2002 residency at Syracuse University saw So examining American cultural identity from the point of view of an outsider to the culture, using the Barbie doll as a representative of American womanhood in the series 'Barbie as Tatiana'. In the photographs, Barbie is shown against a backdrop of typical American scenes. So also worked in a site-specific manner, responding to particular locations and histories.

A supporter of Chinese culture and heritage, So helped to found Ricefield Chinese Arts & Cultural Centre in Glasgow, and was the first exhibitor in the venue, in 2004.

== Personal life ==
So was married three times, to Christopher Thomson (1970-1982), James Hardie (2001-2007) and James Thomson (2007), and had two children.
