= Henry Gray (Scottish surgeon) =

Scottish surgeon (1870–1938)

Sir Henry McIlltree Williamson Gray (1870–1938) was a Scottish surgeon who made very important contributions to the treatment of wounded soldiers during the First World War. He pioneered the operation of wound excision, which is a procedure to systematically remove all devitalised and contaminated tissue, leaving only healthy bleeding tissue behind. Wound excision saved limbs and lives by reducing the incidence of major wound infections, including gas gangrene. Gray was also an expert in the management of compound fractures of the femur, which carried a mortality of 80% in 1914–1915.

== Early life ==
Henry McIlltree Williamson Gray was born in Aberdeen on 14 March 1870. He was the fifth child of Alexander Reith Gray and Barbara Shand Anderson. He attended Merchiston Castle School in Edinburgh and studied medicine at the University of Aberdeen, graduating with honours in 1895. After serving as house surgeon to Sir Alexander Ogston, Professor of Surgery at the University of Aberdeen, he studied in Germany for eighteen months where he learned the techniques of aseptic surgery, which he introduced to Aberdeen when he became a consultant surgeon there in 1904. In the intervening years leading up to the war, he established himself as a surgeon of outstanding ability who set himself very high standards and expected others in his team to follow suit. To be trained by Gray gave young surgeons a confidence that boded well for future success. As well as credited with bringing aseptic surgery to Aberdeen, he was instrumental in introducing local anaesthesia to surgery in Britain.

== World War I ==
During the First World War, Gray served in France for three and a half years, at first in charge of a group of base hospitals in Rouen, then from 1917 as Consulting Surgeon to the British Third Army. He was mentioned in dispatches five times and was awarded a knighthood for services to war surgery.

Gray attributed the high percentage mortality of fractures of the femur during the first two years of the war to inadequate splintage of fractures, which resulted in excessive blood loss during the transfer of the wounded from "No Man's Land" to casualty clearing stations. Most arrived in a state of circulatory collapse unable to withstand surgery. During the Battle of Arras in April–May 1917, Gray used Thomas Splints exclusively, which immobilised fractures much more effectively. Patients reached casualty clearing stations in good clinical condition and fit to undergo limb and life saving surgery. He reported on the outcome of 1,009 fractures of the femur. Only 5% of patients reached casualty clearing stations in clinical shock due to blood loss and unfit for surgery. The mortality in his series was 15.9%.

Gray published work on penetrating wounds of the knee joint. He was an authority on infected gunshot wounds. He was experienced in the management of gunshot wounds of the head and spinal cord. He published work on gas gangrene. If all devitalised tissue was removed, and there was no dead tissue left behind, the patient would not develop gas gangrene. If the patient already had gangrene, then he could only be saved by excision of all dead tissue, although even then he might die from multiple organ failure caused by release of powerful toxins. Gray even removed a bullet from the heart of a patient under local anaesthetic. His work received widespread acclaim from Australian and New Zealand medical officers, and he received special mention in their respective official medical histories. He was admired by many young surgeons working in casualty clearing stations because he was extremely supportive of them. They in return held a special dinner in London to acknowledge his achievements during the war.

== After the First World War ==
Gray returned to Aberdeen but never settled. He was offered, and accepted, the position of Surgeon-in-Chief to the Royal Victoria Hospital (RVH) in Montreal, but when he went to Canada he became involved in bitter political infighting between Sir Arthur Currie, Principal and Vice-chancellor of McGill University and Sir Henry Vincent Meredith, President of the RVH, over the issue of whether Gray should be offered the Chair of Surgery at McGill University. Rather than furthering his surgical prospects, the move to Montreal destroyed him professionally. He lived out the rest of his life in surgical obscurity. He died in Montreal in 1938.
