= Ernest Kitto =

Scottish cricketer

Personal information
- Full name: Ernest Victor Morland Kitto
- Born: 21 January 1871; Liverpool, Lancashire, England
- Died: 27 December 1897 (aged 26); At sea

Domestic team information
- Years: Team
- 1894/95: Canterbury
- Only FC: 9 November 1894 Canterbury v Wellington

Career statistics
Competition	First-class
Matches	1
Runs scored	10
Batting average	5.00
100s/50s	0/0
Top score	7
Catches/stumpings	0/–
- Source: CricketArchive, 12 December 2009

Ernest Victor Morland Kitto (21 January 1871 – 27 December 1897) was a cricketer who made one first-class appearance for Canterbury in 1894–95. Playing in a drawn match against Wellington, he made seven runs in the first innings batting at number eight, and three in the second innings after being promoted to number four.
