= William Barr (artist) =

American artist

William Barr (26 April 1867–25 February 1933, Glasgow, Scotland) began his art studies as a student at the Paisley School of Art and Design, where he earned art teachers and art masters certificates. He went on to the Glasgow School of Art (1895–98), South Kensington School of Art in London and Académie Julian in Paris (1904). He taught at the Paisley School of Art for ten years before moving to San Francisco, California, in 1915 to make a living as an artist painting the landscapes of California along with portraits and genre scenes. He painted mainly en plein air landscapes of California until his death on 25 February 1933.

He was married to Elizabeth Stevenson Smith and had two children, Margaret and Ann.
