= 1868 in Scotland =

- Centuries: 17th; 18th; 19th; 20th; 21st
- Decades: 1840s; 1850s; 1860s; 1870s; 1880s
- See also: List of years in Scotland; Timeline of Scottish history 1868 in: The UK • Wales • Elsewhere

Events from the year 1868 in Scotland.

== Incumbents ==
=== Law officers ===
- Lord Advocate – Edward Strathearn Gordon until December; then James Moncreiff
- Solicitor General for Scotland – John Millar; then George Young

=== Judiciary ===
- Lord President of the Court of Session and Lord Justice General – Lord Glencorse
- Lord Justice Clerk – Lord Moncreiff

== Events ==
- 22 March – last fully public hanging in Scotland - that of Joseph Bell at Perth. There is another on 12 May at Dumfries.
- 13 July – Representation of the People (Scotland) Act 1868 ("Scottish Reform Act") passed, creating seven additional Scottish seats in the House of Commons at the expense of English ones, and giving the vote to all male householders.
- 19 August – the clipper Thermopylae is launched at Walter Hood & Company's Aberdeen shipyard for George Thompson's Aberdeen Line.
- October – Kilmarnock Infirmary opened.
- Queen Margaret College (Glasgow) established by the Association for the Higher Education of Women.
- The Western General Hospital is established in Edinburgh.
- Crieff Hydro opened.
- George Baxter opens a grocery shop in Fochabers, the origin of Baxters foods.
- William Low grocery shop established by William Rettie and James Low.
- Rose's lime juice first manufactured, in Leith.

== Births ==
- 13 April – John Blackwood McEwen, composer (died 1948 in London)
- 16 April – Spottiswoode Aitken, silent film actor and Hollywood property developer (died 1933 in the United States)
- 5 June – James Connolly, Irish nationalist leader (executed 1916 in Ireland)
- 7 June – Charles Rennie Mackintosh, architect, designer, watercolourist and artist (died 1928 in London)
- 23 December – Herbert MacNair, artist and designer (died 1955)

== Deaths ==
- 10 February – David Brewster, physicist, mathematician, astronomer, inventor, writer and university principal (born 1781)
- 23 February – Andrew Strath, golfer (born 1837)
- 29 March – Susanna Hawkins, poet (born 1787)
- 17 June – George Arnott Walker-Arnott, botanist (born 1799)
- 17 August – Duncan Forbes, linguist (born 1798)
- 28 November – Robert Ferguson, Liberal politician (born 1802)

== See also ==
- Timeline of Scottish history
- 1868 in Ireland
