= Queens Theatre, Glasgow =

Former theatre in Glasgow, Scotland

Coordinates: 55.857°N 4.242°W

The Queens Theatre was a theatre in Glasgow, Scotland, situated in Watson Street near Glasgow Cross. It was built in 1881 to cater for working class Glaswegians. It was built by Morrison & Mason, major builders in the city up to the 1920s, including building the City Chambers in George Square. It was first operated by Arthur Lloyd and known as the Shakespeare Music Hall. It went on to have a number of names before being named the Queens Theatre in 1897.

In the late 1930s and into the 1950s, the theatre staged long-running twice-nightly pantomime, with Sam Murray as the principal comedian and Doris Droy as supporting singer. The building was purchased by Glasgow Corporation ahead of possible regeneration of the area.

The theatre was destroyed by fire in 1952.
