= A Daughter of Heth =

1871 novel by William Black

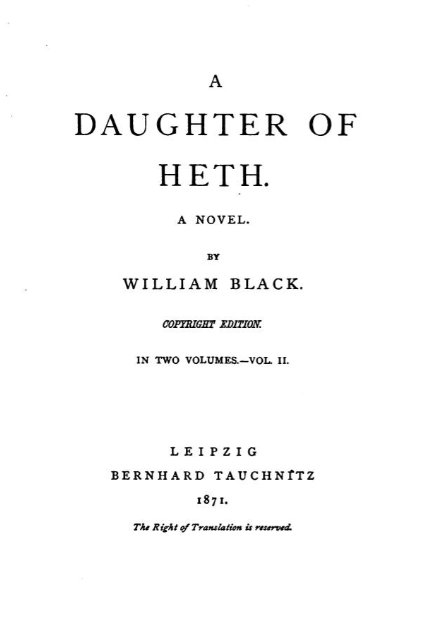
- Title page for A Daughter of Heth (copyright edition, 1871)
- Author: William Black
- Language: English
- Publisher: Sampson Low, Son, & Marston
- Publication date: 1871
- Publication place: London, United Kingdom
- OCLC: 457075593

A Daughter of Heth is a novel by eminent author William Black, first published in 3 volumes by Sampson Low in 1871. It established Black's reputation as a novelist.

== Plot summary ==
Catherine Cassilis, known as Coquette, born in France and orphaned by the recent death of her father, comes to Airlie near Saltcoats in Southern Scotland, to live with her uncle, the Minister. Her Catholic upbringing brings her into immediate conflict with the sternly Presbyterian household, and she quickly seeks sympathy and friendship with the more free-spirited nobleman, Lord Earlshope.

During a yachting trip around western Scotland Earlshope makes a half-hearted confession of his love to Coquette (which she reciprocates), although he is already married, but estranged from his wife. But when this wife is seen in Glasgow, and his secret is exposed, Earlshope abandons Coquette and disappears.

In due course Coquette accepts the marriage proposal of her devoted cousin Tom "the Whaup", although she does not truly love him. Their wedding is to be delayed until Tom has completed his medical studies.

The crisis comes suddenly. Earlshope returns unexpectedly and meets Coquette: he begs her to run off to America with him and she agrees. But on the night of the planned elopement Earlshope's boat is run down in a storm and he is drowned. Coquette believes he has left for America without her.

It is only after her marriage to Tom that Coquette finally learns the truth. She persuades her husband to drive her to Saltcoats to look at her lover's grave—the sea. Shortly after she collapses and within a few short weeks, she too is dead.

== Publication history ==
A Daughter of Heth was first published in 1871 in London by Sampson Low, Son, & Marston, and in the same year in New York City, New York, by Harper & Brothers, as volume 366 in their Library of Select Novels series.
