= Machrihanish Coalfield =

Coal mining region in Scotland

Coordinates: 55.4187°N 5.7289°W

The Machrihanish Coalfield is a coalfield on the Kintyre peninsula in southwest Scotland. It is one of the smallest British coalfields. With the exception of a thin coal beneath the Lyoncross Limestone in the overlying Upper Limestone Formation, all of the coal-bearing strata are found within the Limestone Coal Formation, a subdivision of the Clackmannan Group; all being strata of Namurian age. There are numerous seams of which the Main Coal is the principal one, being some 3 to 4m thick. A further, higher seam known as the Kilkivan Coal has also been worked. The full sequence is:

- Cannel Coal
- Kilkivan Coal
- Main Coal
- Underfoot Coal
- Mid Coal
- Low Coal

Mining was taking place before the 16th century, largely in connection with a local sea-salt industry. Similar but very small scale activity also took place on the northeast coast of the nearby Isle of Arran. It continued at a low level through to the late 18th century when a new pit was sunk at the Argyll Colliery, ushering in the coalfield's busiest period which lasted until the closure of the mine in 1929, following a fire in 1925. Much of the coal was used to fuel the area's numerous distilleries. The coalfield was linked to Campbeltown by a canal from the late 18th century and by a narrow-gauge railway at the end of the 19th century. Mining in the coalfield continued after the opening of a drift mine in 1946 through until 1967.

In 2010 Campbeltown born artist, Jan Nimmo, completed a documentary film, "The Road to Drumleman: Memories of the Argyll Colliery", which tells the story of Kintyre's last mine, the Argyll Colliery, through the narrative of some of the remaining miners.
