= Lachlan Grant =

Scottish medical doctor

Lachlan Grant (1871 – 31 May 1945) was a Scottish medical doctor, medical scientist, general practitioner and occupational physician. For more than 40 years, he worked in Ballachulish, a rural part of the Highlands in Scotland.

== Early life ==
He was born in Johnstone in 1871, moving to Ballachulish when he was nine years of age and then educated at Ballachulish Public School. He studied medicine at University of Edinburgh Medical School, graduating with a B.M., C.M. (with distinction) in 1894 and then a M.D. in 1896, with a thesis on ophthalmic work.

== Medical career ==
He returned to Ballachulish in the late 1890s. In 1900 he entered employment as medical officer for the workers at the Ballachulish Slate Quarries Company. The company tried to dismiss Grant in 1902 but the workers gathered and expressed their support for Grant. The workers stood by him and at the end of 1903 the directors of the company signed an agreement allowing him to return to his position. In 1930 he became the Medical Officer of Health for British Aluminium.

He took a Diploma in Public Health in 1911.

He gave evidence to the committee chaired by Sir John Dewar which had been set up to examine the state of healthcare provision in the Highlands and Islands of Scotland. The findings, published in 1912, known as the Dewar Report, eventually leading to the establishment of the Highlands and Islands Medical Service.

In 1921 he became a Fellow of the Royal College of Physicians and Surgeons of Glasgow.

He built a small laboratory beside his surgery which allowed him to be involved in some research about tuberculosis.

== Social reform ==
He is also known for his efforts towards economic and social development in the Highlands. In 1907 he had been the principal speaker at a meeting of the Crofters' and Cottars' Association held in Oban and spoke out about how depopulation was affecting the Highlands. He was co-founder of the Highland Development League. In 1936 he wrote a pamphlet entitled the “New Deal” in which he made suggestions towards a policy for development of the Highlands. This led the Highland Economic Committee to issue a report in November 1938 but Grant had concerns that many smallholders and crofters wouldn’t qualify for a ploughing scheme that the Government had proposed.

Grant died in Ballachulish on 31 May 1945.

== Memorial ==
In 2011 a slate monument was erected in Ballachulish to commemorate Grant and another local man Angus Clark who both fought for better conditions for workers.
