= William Black (novelist) =

Scottish novelist (1841–1898)

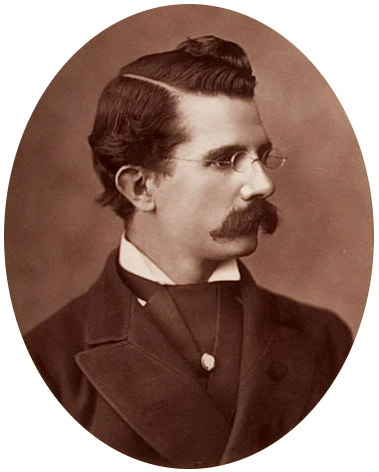
- Born: 13 November 1841; Glasgow, Lanarkshire
- Died: 10 December 1898 (aged 57); Brighton, Sussex
- Occupation: novelist
- Notable work: A Daughter of Heth (1871); A Princess of Thule (1873)

Signature
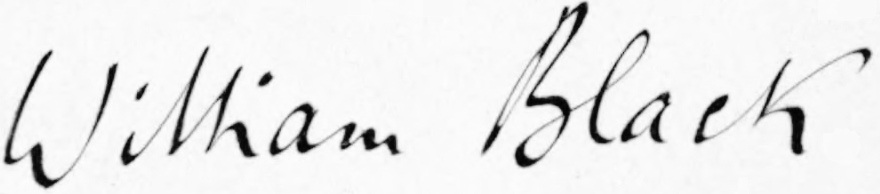

William Black (13 November 1841 – 10 December 1898) was a novelist born in Glasgow, Scotland. During his lifetime, Black's novels were immensely popular and compared favourably with those of Anthony Trollope. However, his fame and popularity did not survive long into the 20th century.

== Biography ==
William was born to James Black and his second wife Caroline Conning. He was educated to be a landscape painter, a training that influenced his literary life. As a writer, he became known for his detailed, atmospheric descriptions of landscapes and seascapes in novels such as White Wings: A Yachting Romance (1880).

At the age of 23 he went to London, having had some experience with Glasgow journalism. He joined the staff of the Morning Star and later the Daily News, of which he became assistant-editor. He wrote a weekly serial in The Graphic. During the Austro-Prussian War, he acted as a war correspondent.

Black's first novel, James Merle, appeared in 1864, and had little success. Black later disowned it and reputedly bought copies to destroy them. Two further early novels Love or Marriage (1868) and The Monarch of Mincing Lane (1871) did little to advance his career, and all three were omitted from the collected edition of Black's works issued by the publisher Sampson Low from 1892.

The publication of A Daughter of Heth in 1871 at once established his popularity. It tells of a young girl brought up in Catholic France, who comes to live with her more austere Protestant relatives in southern Scotland, and ends with personal tragedy. The travel story The Strange Adventures of a Phaeton followed in 1872. In 1874 A Princess of Thule was another big success, later adapted into a musical play, The Maid of Arran, by a young L. Frank Baum.

From the following year Black devoted himself wholly to fiction. Several collections of short stories and a further 22 novels followed; the last – Wild Eelin – in 1898, just before his death on 10 December of that year.

During his lifetime, Black's novels were immensely popular and were compared favourably with those of Anthony Trollope, though some critics complained that they put too much emphasis on hunting and fishing. However, his fame and popularity did not survive long into the 20th century. His works were bootlegged in the United States, not being protected by copyright laws. He teamed with such well-known authors as Rudyard Kipling, Thomas Hardy and Walter Besant to combat this procedure, resulting in the passing of new laws in 1891, but unlike the others, he held no grudge against those who sold unauthorised copies of his books while it was legal to do so, which made relations easier and friendlier between him and his American publishers. Baum's play was written without regard to copyright courtesy when such was legal: it is uncertain if Black was even aware of its existence, as Reid does not mention it in his biography. (He did not receive credit in the play's advertising or programs, although reviewers often mentioned him.)

His later novels included two further "tragic" tales: Madcap Violet (1876) and Macleod of Dare (1879); Sunrise (1881) a novel of international political intrigue; Shandon Bells (1883) largely set in Ireland; Yolande (1883). in part dealing with drug addiction; Judith Shakespeare (1884) a historical novel featuring the playwright's daughter; and The New Prince Fortunatus (1890) a novel of London theatrical life. Friendship with the actor Mary Anderson resulted in him acting on stage twice, in mute roles known as "thinkers" (in Romeo and Juliet and The Winter's Tale), but his nervousness interrupted the performance.

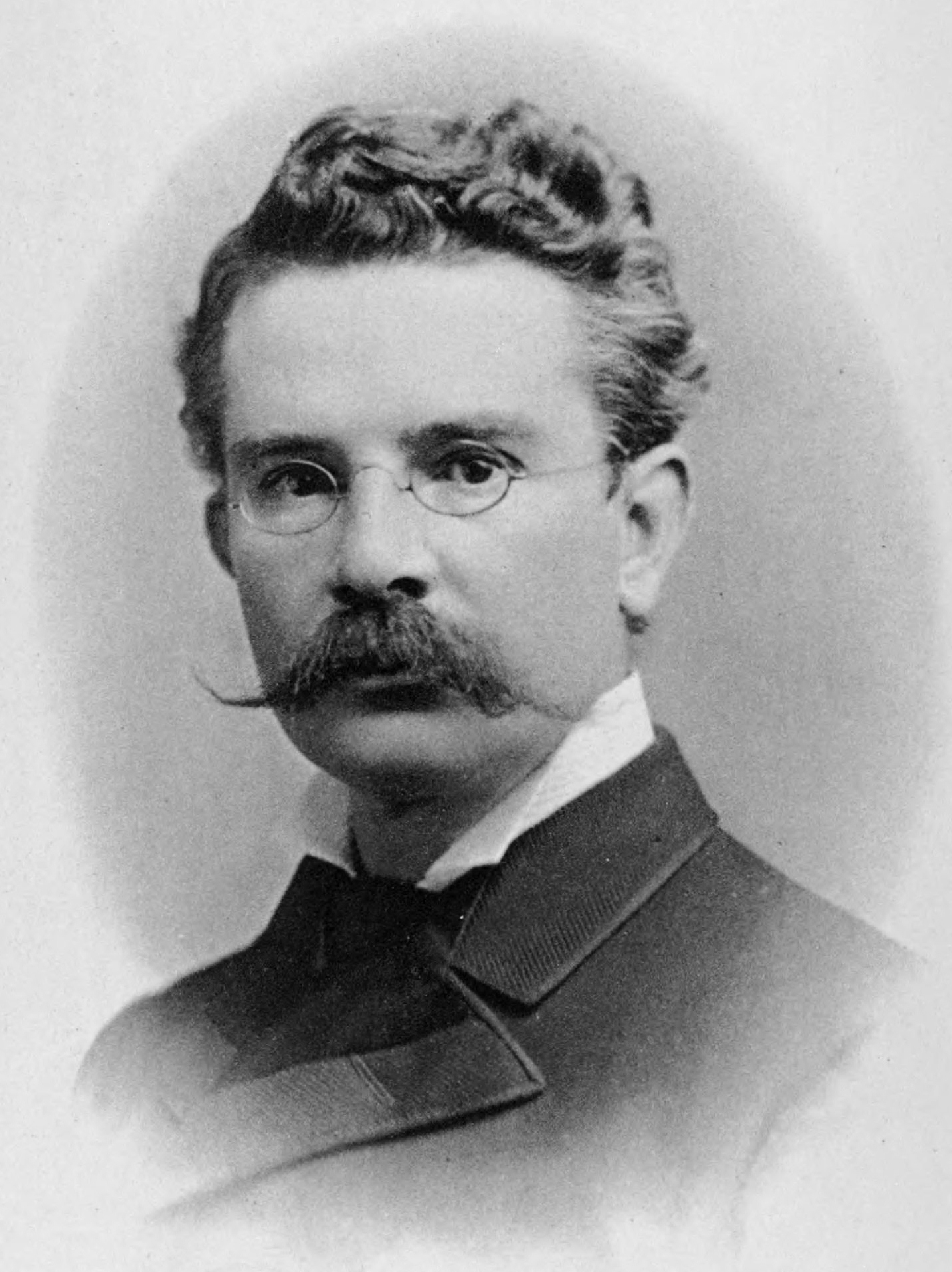
William Black, c. 1890s

Black also produced the volume Goldsmith (1878) for Morley's English Men of Letters series.

Black is remembered by a lighthouse built in the form of a Gothic tower "on a spot that he knew and loved, by his friends and admirers from all over the world," as recorded on a carved plaque over the door. The building was erected in 1901 and is still in use as a lighthouse. It stands a mile or so south of Duart Castle, at the eastern extremity of the Isle of Mull.

A collection of sketch-stories, including portions of the suppressed James Merle were published posthumously as With the Eyes of Youth, and Other Sketches (1903).

== Family ==
Black married his first wife, Augusta Wenzel, in April 1865 and she died on 14 May 1866 of a fever contracted not long after the birth of their son, Martin. Martin then died on 29 March 1871.

Black first met his second wife, Eva Simpson, daughter of Wharton Simpson, a fellow journalist and fellow member of Whitefriars Club, in 1869. He saw her again in 1872 and used her as the basis for Bell in The Phaeton. They were married in April 1874 and she was still alive when Wemyss Reid, who had offered Black a contributor's role on the Leeds Mercury, published his biography.

From 1879 until his death, Black lived at 1 Paston Place, Brighton.

== Recognition ==
A memorial to Black, in the form of a small castle, was built at Duart Point designed by Glasgow architect William Leiper.

== Works ==
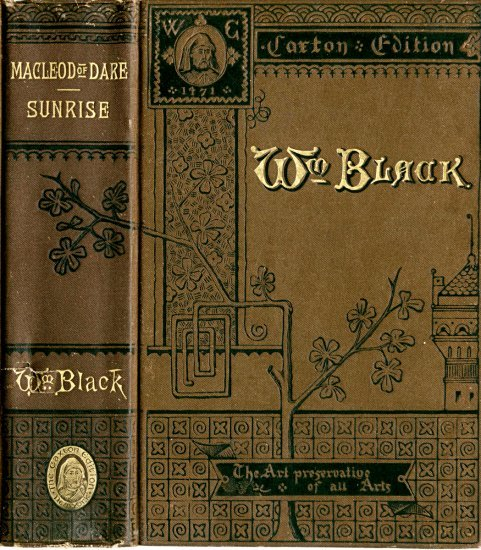
Cover of Macleod of Dare & Sunrise by William Black, from a John B. Alden 1883 publication in New York

- James Merle (1864)
- Love or Marriage (1868)
- In Silk Attire (1869)
- Kilmeny (1870)
- The Monarch of Mincing Lane (1871)
- Mr Pisistratus Brown, M.P., in the Highlands (1871)
- A Daughter of Heth (1871)
- The Strange Adventures of a Phaeton (1872)
- A Princess of Thule (1873)
- The Maid of Killeena and other Stories (1874)
- Three Feathers (1875)
- Madcap Violet (1876)
- Lady Silverdale's Sweetheart and Other Stories (1876)
- Green Pastures and Piccadilly (1877)
- Macleod of Dare (1878)
- Goldsmith [English Men of Letters] (1878)
- White Wings (1880)
- The Beautiful Wretch, The Four MacNicols, The Pupil of Aurelius (1881)
- Sunrise (1881)
- Shandon Bells (1883)
- Yolande (1883)
- Adventures in Thule (1883)
- Judith Shakespeare (1884)
- White Heather (1885)
- The Wise Women of Inverness and Other Miscellanies (1885)
- Sabina Zembra (1887)
- In Far Lochaber (1888)
- The Strange Adventures of a Houseboat (1888)
- The Penance of John Logan and Two Other Tales (1889)
- The New Prince Fortunatus (1890)
- Stand Fast Craig-Royston! (1890)
- Donald Ross of Heimra (1891)
- The Magic Ink and Other Tales (1892)
- Wolfenberg (1892)
- The Handsome Humes (1893)
- Highland Cousins (1894)
- Briseis (1896)
- Wild Eelin (1898)
- With the Eyes of Youth, and Other Sketches (1903) [posthumous]
