= Ellen Johnston =

Scottish power-loom weaver and poet

- Born: c.1835 Hamilton
- Died: April 12, 1874; Glasgow
- Occupation: Power Loom weaver
- Known for: Poetry
- Children: A daughter, Mary Achenvole

Ellen Johnston known as "The Factory Girl" (1835 – April 12, 1874) was a Scottish power-loom weaver and poet. She is known because of her autobiography and later reevaluations of her working class poetry.

== Biography ==
Ellen Johnston was born in Muir Wynd, Hamilton, in 1835. Her mother was Mary Bisland, a milliner, and her father was James Johnston, a stonemason employed by the Duke of Hamilton. He emigrated to America when Johnston was an infant, and it was supposed that he died there. Her mother remarried. 20 years later, when James Johnson learned of this, he took his own life. Johnston implied that her stepfather sexually abused her. She made frequent attempts to run away from home. At the age of 11, Johnston began work as a power-loom weaver. According to Johnston, she was forced to do this by her stepfather to cure her of her bookish pretensions.

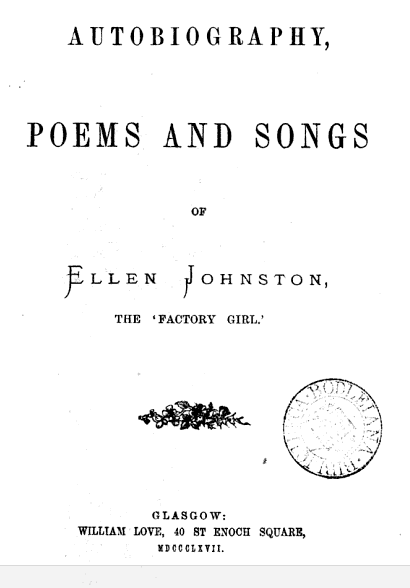
Her 1867 autobiography

Johnston could read and she enjoyed reading. She was interested particularly in the writings of the Scottish novelist Sir Walter Scott. She was not shy and she hoped one day to be an actress.

Johnston gave birth to her daughter Mary Achenvole Johnston in 1852. The child was born out of wedlock, and Johnston was abandoned by the father. As a young child, Mary was very unwell; a doctor told Johnstone that Mary would die "without a change of air", requiring her to take time away from work to care for her.

She did not get on well with her workmates as she was over keen to please her bosses/ In 1854 she had her first poem published, "Lord Raglan's address to the allied armies", in the Glasgow Examiner. The Reverend George Gilfillan (the poet) wrote well of her work as did the Duke of Buccleuch although some might have been patronising. She continued to publish poetry in newspapers as "The Factory Girl" and at one point she gave up work due to illness but lack of money took her back. Her mother died in 1861 and she went to live with her aunt in Dundee.

It was said that in 1863 she could not get a job in Dundee because of her unpopularity.

In 1867 she published her autobiography, Poems and Songs of Ellen Johnston, the ‘Factory Girl.

== Death and legacy ==
On 6 April 1870, Johnston applied for poor relief. The application stated that she had been out of work since September 1869 due to sickness and had supported herself financially since then by selling her clothes and jewellery. She applied for poor relief again in March 1873. On 20 April 1874, she died from anasarca at the age of 46 in the Barony Poorhouse in Glasgow. Florence Boos suggested that her ill health was likely expedited by the poor conditions she experienced as a factory worker.

Johnston's work has been analysed by scholars for its themes of gender, class and domesticity; it is considered an important example of dialect writing, autobiography, and working-class literature. Florence Boos has stated that Ellen Johnston is perhaps "the best-known woman factory poet". According to Monica Smith Hart, her writing shows Johnston as having possessed a sensitivity to those experiencing financial struggles and a strong passion for fair labour practices.

In 1991, Johnston's poem "The Last Sark" was published in An Anthology of Scottish Women Poets. In 1998, Gustav Klaus's biography Factory Girl: Ellen Johnston and Working-class Poetry in Victorian Scotland was published. In 2007, her autobiography was reprinted.
