= Daniel Blades, Lord Blades =

Scottish judge (1888–1959)

Daniel Patterson Blades, Lord Blades, FRSE (25 August 1888 – 6 February 1959) was a Scottish judge.

== Life ==
Blades was the son of Sarah Pow of Armadale and Rev. Charles Blades, minister of Allanton. He was educated at Berwickshire High School and the University of Edinburgh graduating with an MA and LLB.

He was admitted as an advocate in 1915, and served as a 2nd Lieutenant in the Cameron Highlanders from 1915–1918. He was an Advocate Depute from 1929–1932, when he was appointed a King's Counsel and Sheriff of Forfar. In 1934 he moved to be Sheriff of Perth and Angus, a post he held until 1945.

From 1938 to 1941 he was Deputy Chairman of the Fishery Board for Scotland from 1938 to 1941.

In September 1945 he was appointed Solicitor General for Scotland. In 1947 he was appointed a Senator of the College of Justice, with the judicial title Lord Blades.

== Family ==
In 1918 he married Gertrude Thonson Legge.

Legal offices
Preceded by David King Murray	Solicitor General for Scotland; 1945–1947	Succeeded by John Wheatley
