= John Millar, Lord Craighill =

Scottish lawyer and judge

John Millar, Lord Craighill (1817–1888) was a Scottish lawyer and judge. He served two brief terms as Solicitor General for Scotland and in 1874 was appointed a Senator of the College of Justice.

== Life ==
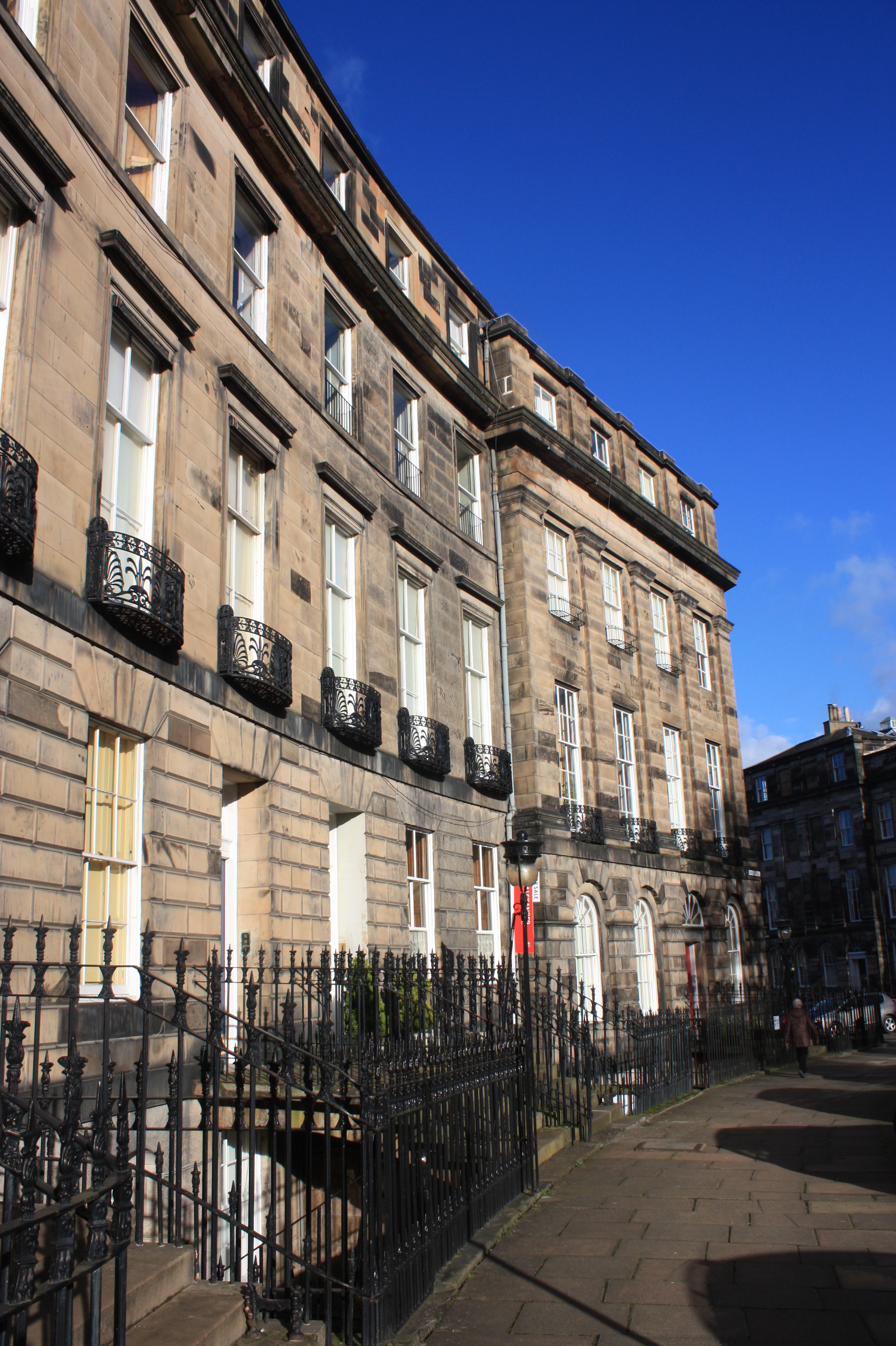
2 Ainslie Place, Edinburgh

Millar was born in 1817, the son of John Hepburn Millar, a Glasgow merchant. Millar studied at the University of Glasgow and in 1842 was admitted to the Faculty of Advocates. In 1863, he married Elizabeth Neaves, daughter of Lord Neaves, a Senator of the College of Justice and former Solicitor General.

He served as an Advocate Depute, a Crown prosecutor in the High Court of Justiciary, from 1858 to 1859 and 1866 to 1867, before being appointed Solicitor General for Scotland, the country's junior Law Officer, in 1867 in the Conservative government of the Earl of Derby. The prior holder of the office, Edward Gordon (later Lord Gordon of Drumearn) had been appointed Lord Advocate, the senior Scottish Law Officer.

Millar only held the office until February 1868, when the Earl of Derby was replaced as Prime Minister by Benjamin Disraeli. He was appointed Queen's Counsel (QC) in 1868. He returned to the office of Solicitor General briefly in 1874, again under Edward Gordon as Lord Advocate, before being appointed a Senator of the College of Justice, a judge of the Court of Session, the same year. His judicial title was Lord Craighill, the name of his estate in Angus. He was awarded an honorary degree of Doctor of Laws by the University of Glasgow in 1875.

He lived at 2 Ainslie Place on the Moray Estate in Edinburgh's West End. (A newspaper obituary in the Aberdeen Free Press, 24 September 1888, page 5 column 1, several other newspaper obituaries, and also his probate record, say 3 Ainslie Place.)

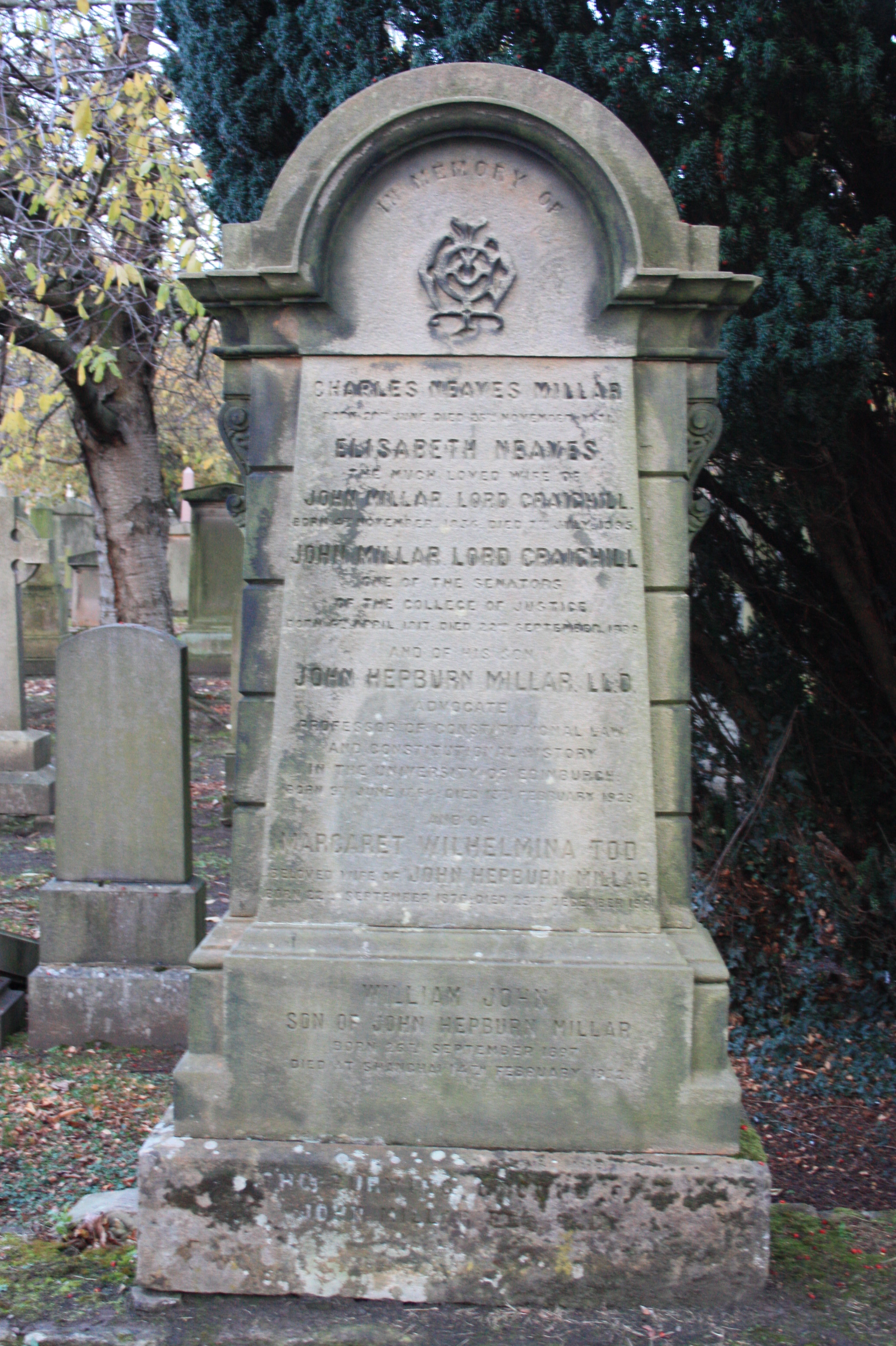
The grave of John Millar, Lord Craighill, Grange Cemetery, Edinburgh

He died in Edinburgh on 22 September 1888, at the age of 71. He is buried with his family in Grange Cemetery in south Edinburgh. The grave lies facing west onto the western path near the north-west entrance.

== Family ==
He married Elizabeth Neaves, daughter of Charles Neaves, Lord Neaves.

Their children included John Hepburn Millar LL.D. (1864–1929), a lawyer, historian, academic and author.

Legal offices
| Preceded by Edward Gordon | Solicitor General for Scotland; 1867–1868 | Succeeded by George Young |
| Preceded by Andrew Rutherfurd-Clark | Solicitor General for Scotland; 1874 | Succeeded by William Watson |
