= Andrew Rutherfurd-Clark, Lord Rutherfurd-Clark =

Scottish judge (1828–1899)

Andrew Rutherfurd Clark, Lord Rutherfurd-Clark (1828 – 26 July 1899) was a Scottish judge.

== Life ==
He was born Andrew Clark the second son of Rev. Thomas Clark (1790-1857), minister of Methven in central Perthshire at the time of Andrew's birth, but originally from Galloway. The family moved with his father's various posts, going to Edinburgh in 1841 when Rev Clark got an appointment in the Old Kirk, then one of the four parishes housed in St Giles Cathedral. They then lived at 8 Newington Place in the south of the city.

After the Disruption of 1843 his father was asked to replace John Bruce as minister of St Andrew's Church, on George Street. Andrew's mother, Grizel Rutherfurd, was the daughter of Rev. Prof. William Greenfield, one of Bruce's predecessor at St Andrew's Church.

He was called to the Scottish bar in 1849. He served as sheriff of Inverness from 1860 to 1862, and of Haddington and Berwick from 1862 to 1869, and as Solicitor General for Scotland from 1869 to 1874. He succeeded George Young in all three appointments.

He was Dean of the Faculty of Advocates from 1874 to 1875 and was raised to the bench with the judicial title Lord Rutherfurd Clark. He resigned from the bench in 1896.

== Family ==
His uncle Andrew Rutherfurd was also a Senator of the College of Justice and had changed his name from Greenfield following a family scandal. His uncle died childless in 1854 and Andrew inherited his estate, but on condition that Andrew's surname was thereafter Rutherfurd-Clark.

He married his cousin, the daughter of Major James H. Rutherford. Their eldest daughter Hon. Jane Grace Clark (d. 1903) was married to Paul Kilian, MD, of Dresden.

Legal offices
Preceded by George Young	Solicitor General for Scotland; 1869–1874	Succeeded by John Millar
