= George Thomson, Lord Thomson =

Scottish politician and judge (1893–1962)

George Reid Thomson, Lord Thomson, PC (1893 – 15 April 1962) was a Scottish Labour Party politician and judge.

Educated at the South African College, Cape Town, and Corpus Christi College, Oxford, he was a captain in the Argyll and Sutherland Highlanders in World War I.

He was admitted as an advocate in 1922, and appointed a King's Counsel in 1936. He was an Advocate Depute from 1940 to 1945. He sat as member of parliament (MP) for Edinburgh East from October 1945 until October 1947 and served as Lord Advocate from October 1945. He was appointed a Privy Counsellor in 1945.

In October 1947 he was raised to the bench as Lord Justice Clerk, replacing Lord Moncrieff. He took the judicial title Lord Thomson. He held this office until his death in 1962.

Parliament of the United Kingdom
Preceded by Frederick Pethick-Lawrence	Member of Parliament for Edinburgh East; 1945–1947	Succeeded by John Wheatley
Legal offices
Preceded by James Reid	Lord Advocate; 1945–1947	Succeeded by John Wheatley
Preceded by Moncrieff	Lord Justice Clerk; 1947–1962	Succeeded by Lord Grant
