= List of years in Scottish television =

This page indexes the individual year in Scottish television pages.

2020s - 2010s - 2000s - 1990s - 1980s - 1970s - 1960s - 1950s

== 2020s ==
- 2024 in Scottish television
- 2023 in Scottish television
- 2022 in Scottish television
- 2021 in Scottish television
- 2020 in Scottish television

== 2010s ==
- 2019 in Scottish television
- 2018 in Scottish television
- 2017 in Scottish television
- 2016 in Scottish television
- 2015 in Scottish television
- 2014 in Scottish television
- 2013 in Scottish television
- 2012 in Scottish television
- 2011 in Scottish television
- 2010 in Scottish television

== 2000s ==
- 2009 in Scottish television
- 2008 in Scottish television
- 2007 in Scottish television
- 2006 in Scottish television
- 2005 in Scottish television
- 2004 in Scottish television
- 2003 in Scottish television
- 2002 in Scottish television
- 2001 in Scottish television
- 2000 in Scottish television

== 1990s ==
- 1999 in Scottish television
- 1998 in Scottish television
- 1997 in Scottish television
- 1996 in Scottish television
- 1995 in Scottish television
- 1994 in Scottish television
- 1993 in Scottish television
- 1992 in Scottish television
- 1991 in Scottish television
- 1990 in Scottish television

== 1980s ==
- 1989 in Scottish television
- 1988 in Scottish television
- 1987 in Scottish television
- 1986 in Scottish television
- 1985 in Scottish television
- 1984 in Scottish television
- 1983 in Scottish television
- 1982 in Scottish television
- 1981 in Scottish television
- 1980 in Scottish television

== 1970s ==
- 1979 in Scottish television
- 1978 in Scottish television
- 1977 in Scottish television
- 1976 in Scottish television
- 1975 in Scottish television
- 1974 in Scottish television
- 1973 in Scottish television
- 1972 in Scottish television
- 1971 in Scottish television
- 1970 in Scottish television

== 1960s ==
- 1969 in Scottish television
- 1968 in Scottish television
- 1967 in Scottish television
- 1966 in Scottish television
- 1965 in Scottish television
- 1964 in Scottish television
- 1963 in Scottish television
- 1962 in Scottish television
- 1961 in Scottish television
- 1960 in Scottish television

== 1950s ==
- 1959 in Scottish television
- 1958 in Scottish television
- 1957 in Scottish television
- 1956 in Scottish television
- 1955 in Scottish television
- 1954 in Scottish television
- 1953 in Scottish television
- 1952 in Scottish television

== See also ==
- List of years in television
