= 1903 in Scotland =

- Centuries: 18th; 19th; 20th; 21st
- Decades: 1880s; 1890s; 1900s; 1910s; 1920s
- See also: List of years in Scotland; Timeline of Scottish history 1903 in: The UK • Wales • Elsewhere; Scottish football: 1902–03 • 1903–04

Events from the year 1903 in Scotland.

== Incumbents ==
- Secretary for Scotland and Keeper of the Great Seal – Lord Balfour of Burleigh to 9 October; then Andrew Murray

=== Law officers ===
- Lord Advocate – Andrew Murray until October; then Charles Dickson
- Solicitor General for Scotland – Charles Dickson; then David Dundas

=== Judiciary ===
- Lord President of the Court of Session and Lord Justice General – Lord Blair Balfour
- Lord Justice Clerk – Lord Kingsburgh

== Events ==
- January – East Fife Football Club is established.
- 12 February – the North British Locomotive Company of Springburn in Glasgow is formed by merger of Sharp, Stewart and Company, Neilson, Reid and Company and Dübs and Company. In April it receives its first new order for steam locomotives, from India.
- March – Ferguson Shipbuilders established at Port Glasgow.
- 3 March – the British Admiralty announces plans to build Rosyth Dockyard as a naval base on the Firth of Forth at Rosyth.
- April – Norwegians begin whaling from Shetland.
- 14 April – Aberdeen Football Club is established.
- 10 June – the floral clock in Princes Street Gardens, Edinburgh, begins operation, the world's first.

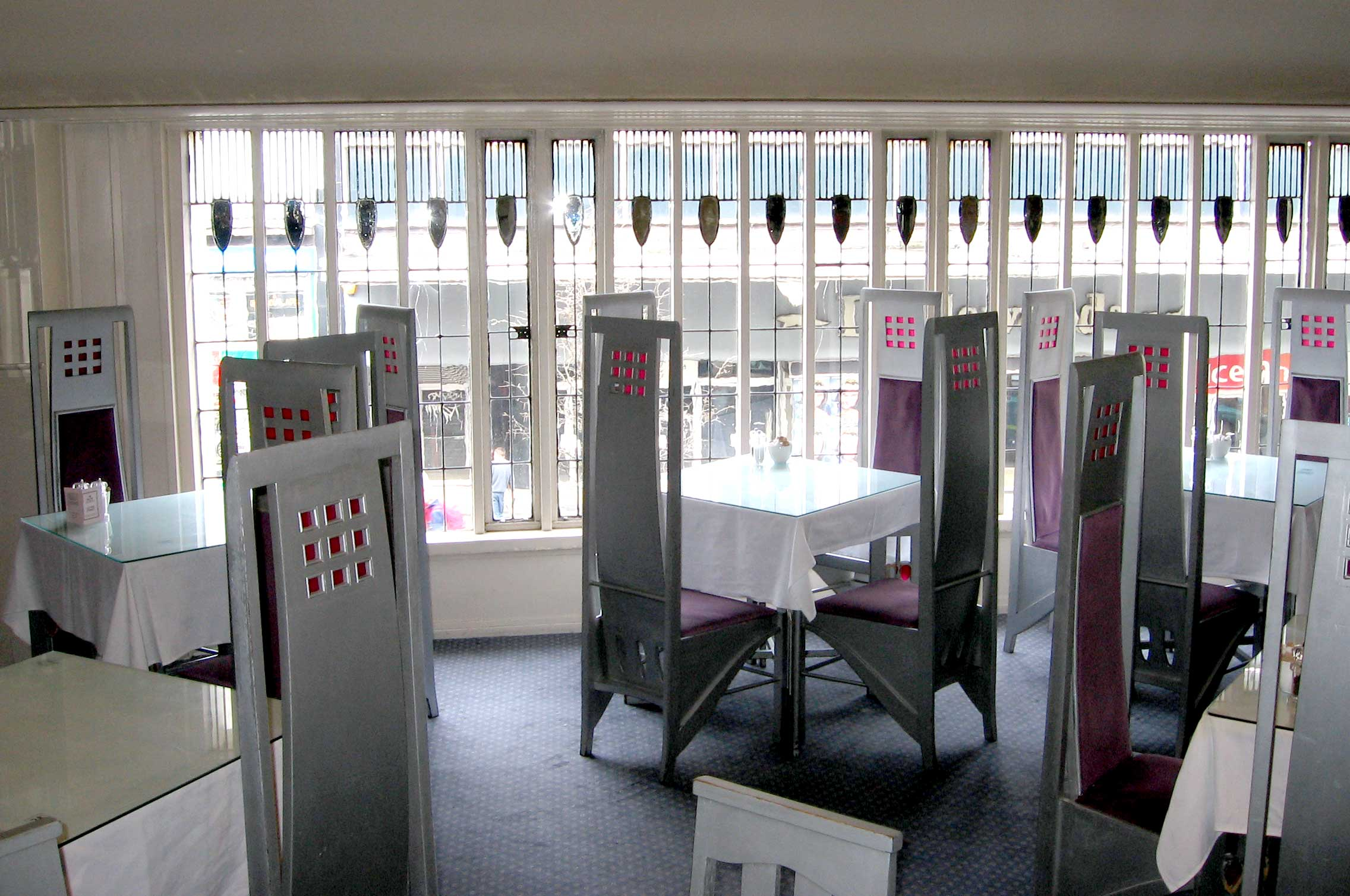
Willow Tearooms

- 1 July – opening of Wick and Lybster Light Railway.
- 27 July – Glasgow St Enoch rail accident: 17 are killed when a Glasgow and South Western Railway train collides with the buffer stops at St Enoch railway station.
- 2 August – Pittencrieff Park is gifted to the people of Dunfermline by Andrew Carnegie.
- 24 August – opening of Ballachulish branch railway, including Connel Bridge over the Falls of Lora.
- October
  - Opening of Willow Tearooms in Sauchiehall Street, Glasgow, designed by Charles Rennie Mackintosh for Catherine Cranston.
  - The Scottish Historical Review is first published under this title.
- 7 October – Perth Corporation Tramways take over the horse-drawn operations of the Perth and District Tramways.
- 31 October – opening of Hampden Park football ground in Glasgow.
- 9 December – opening of Glasgow East End Industrial Exhibition.
- Northern Lighthouse Board lighthouses: Construction of Scalasaig Light on Colonsay (Inner Hebrides; by David Alan Stevenson) and navigation light on Lady Isle (Firth of Clyde).

== Births ==
- 15 January – Hugh Fraser, retailer (died 1966)
- 3 February – Douglas Douglas-Hamilton, 14th Duke of Hamilton, peer and pioneering aviator, chief pilot of the first flight over Mount Everest in 1933 (born in London; died 1973)
- 15 March – Charles Donaldson, Conservative politician (died 1964)
- 9 April – Marion Ross, physicist (died 1994)
- 23 April – Ian Collins, tennis player, representing Great Britain in the Davis Cup (died 1975)
- 24 April – Joseph Macleod, poet, actor, playwright, theatre director, theatre historian and BBC newsreader (born in London; died 1984)
- 15 May – William MacTaggart, painter, known for his landscapes of East Lothian, France, Norway and elsewhere (died 1981)
- 17 June – William Vallance Douglas Hodge, mathematician, specifically a geometer (died 1975)
- 2 July – Alec Douglas-Home, Baron Home of the Hirsel, British Conservative politician, Prime Minister from October 1963 to October 1964 (born in London; died 1995)
- 3 July – David Webster, arts administrator (died 1971 in England)
- 28 July – Keith Murray, academic and Rector of Lincoln College, Oxford (died 1993)
- 9 August – Emil Fischbacher, Protestant Christian missionary to Xinjiang, with the China Inland Mission (died 1933)
- 5 September – Harry Harvey Wood, literary and artistic figure, a founder of the Edinburgh International Festival (died 1977)
- 31 October – Ian Smith, international rugby player (died 1972)
- 19 December – Andrew Murray, Lord Provost of Edinburgh 1947 to 1951 (died 1977)
- 29 December – George Elrick, bandleader and disc jockey (died 1999)
- Undated
  - Oliver Brown, nationalist political activist (died 1976)
  - Ben Humble, writer and climber (died 1977)
  - Hector MacAndrew, fiddler (died 1980)

== Deaths ==
- 3 February – David George Ritchie, philosopher (born 1853)
- 7 March – Hely Hutchinson Almond, rugby player and educationalist (born 1832)
- 17 May – John Ross, Australian drover and explorer (born 1817)
- 19 May – John Scott, shipbuilder (born 1830)
- 3 July – Matthew Holmes, steam locomotive designer (born 1844)
- 31 August – William Hastie, clergyman and theologian (born 1842)
- 18 September – Alexander Bain, philosopher and educationalist (born 1818)
- Undated – Thomas John MacLagan, Dundee doctor and pharmacologist (born 1838)

== The arts ==
- Hill House, Helensburgh, designed by Charles Rennie Mackintosh
- "Hector the Hero", a classic lament, composed by James Scott Skinner

== See also ==
- Timeline of Scottish history
- 1903 in Ireland
