= 1909 in Scotland =

- Centuries: 18th; 19th; 20th; 21st
- Decades: 1880s; 1890s; 1900s; 1910s; 1920s
- See also: List of years in Scotland; Timeline of Scottish history 1909 in: The UK • Wales • Elsewhere; Scottish football: 1908–09 • 1909–10

Events from the year 1909 in Scotland.

== Incumbents ==
- Secretary for Scotland and Keeper of the Great Seal – John Sinclair, 1st Baron Pentland

=== Law officers ===
- Lord Advocate – Thomas Shaw; then Alexander Ure
- Solicitor General for Scotland – Alexander Ure; then Arthur Dewar

=== Judiciary ===
- Lord President of the Court of Session and Lord Justice General – Lord Dunedin
- Lord Justice Clerk – Lord Kingsburgh

== Events ==
- March – Construction of Rosyth Dockyard for the Royal Navy on the east coast begins.
- 17 April – 58 police officers and sixty other people are injured as 6,000 fans invade the pitch and brawl with rival fans and the police at the end of the drawn Scottish Cup Final replay between Rangers and Celtic at Hampden Park, Glasgow. The 1909 Scottish Cup and all medals are withheld.
- 24 May – Dundee United F.C. is formed as Dundee Hibernian, playing its first match on 18 August.
- 25 May – Oscar Slater found guilty of murder in Glasgow.
- 28 July – Harold Barnwell makes the first powered flight in Scotland, an 80-yard (75 m) hop at 4m altitude in a canard biplane built with his brother Frank at Stirling, before crashing.
- 18 September – Partick Thistle F.C. play their first match at their new Firhill Stadium.
- 25 December – International footballer James Main suffers a fatal internal injury while playing for Hibernian F.C. against Partick Thistle at Firhill.
- A new Highland Land League is formed in Glasgow as a broadly left-wing political party.
- The Congested Districts Board buys the island of Vatersay from its absentee landowner and breaks it up into 58 crofts.
- The Royal Zoological Society of Scotland is founded by Thomas Haining Gillespie, an Edinburgh lawyer.
- First British bird ringing programme initiated by Arthur Landsborough Thomson at Aberdeen.
- The Harris Tweed trademark is registered.
- The Scotch whisky brand name Johnnie Walker is introduced.
- New pump room built at the spa town of Strathpeffer.

== Births ==
- 16 January – Ellen King, Olympic swimmer (died 1994 in England)
- 20 January – Olive Fraser, poet (died 1977)
- 21 January – James Hoy, Labour Member of Parliament for Leith 1945-1970 (died 1976)
- 6 February – Seán Rafferty, poet (died 1993 in England)
- 9 February – Marjorie Ogilvie Anderson, historian and paleographer (died 2002)
- 23 February – Lavinia Derwent (real name Elizabeth Dodd), author and broadcaster (died 1989)
- 24 February – Ethel MacDonald, anarchist and publisher (died 1958)
- 6 March – Vagaland (real name Thomas Alexander Robertson), Shetland dialect poet (died 1973)
- 14 March – William Montgomery Watt, historian and Emeritus Professor in Arabic and Islamic studies (died 2006)
- 19 March – Marjorie Linklater, campaigner for the arts and environment of Orkney (died 1997)
- 27 April – Muriel C. Bradbrook, literary scholar and authority on Shakespeare (died 1993 in Cambridge)
- 9 May – Robert Garioch, Scots language poet (died 1981)
- 26 May – Matt Busby, football manager (died 1994)
- 5 June – Marion Crawford, Scottish educator and governess to Princess Margaret and Queen Elizabeth II (died 1988)
- 19 June – William Grant, Lord Grant, Unionist MP, Solicitor General, Lord Advocate, and Lord Justice Clerk (died 1972)
- 5 September – Archie Jackson, Australian international cricketer (died 1933 in Australia)
- 23 November – Nigel Tranter, historical writer (died 2000)
- 2 December – Helen Douglas Adam, poet, writer and dramatist (died 1993 in the United States)
- Helena Gloag, actress (died 1973)

== Deaths ==
- 1 January – Archibald Sturrock, steam locomotive engineer (born 1816)
- 2 March – Simon Somerville Laurie, educator (born 1829)
- 27 March (probable) – John Davidson, poet (born 1857)
- 26 April – Marcus Dods, theologian (born 1834)
- 9 August – Jemima Blackburn, painter and illustrator (born 1823)
- 9 October – Hugh Blackburn, mathematician (born 1823)
- 29 December – James Main, footballer (born 1886)

== The Arts ==
- 2 November – The first English-language performance of a play by Anton Chekhov opens, The Seagull, translated and directed by George Calderon, by the Glasgow Repertory Theatre company at the Royalty Theatre, Glasgow.

== See also ==
- Timeline of Scottish history
- 1909 in Ireland

== Notes ==
- Ewan, Elizabeth L.; Innes, Sue; Reynolds, Sian; Pipes, Rose (27 June 2007). Biographical Dictionary of ScottishWomen. Edinburgh University Press. ISBN 978-0-7486-2660-1.
