= Lord Emslie =

Lord Emslie may refer to:

- George Emslie, Baron Emslie (1919–2002), Lord President of the Court of Session (1972–1989)
- Nigel Emslie, Lord Emslie (born 1947), Senator of the College of Justice
- Derek Emslie, Lord Kingarth (born 1949), Senator of the College of Justice
