= 1972 in Scotland =

- Centuries: 18th; 19th; 20th; 21st
- Decades: 1950s; 1960s; 1970s; 1980s; 1990s
- See also: List of years in Scotland; Timeline of Scottish history 1972 in: The UK • Wales • Elsewhere; Scottish football: 1971–72 • 1972–73; 1972 in Scottish television

Events from the year 1972 in Scotland.

== Incumbents ==
- Secretary of State for Scotland and Keeper of the Great Seal – Gordon Campbell

=== Law officers ===
- Lord Advocate – Norman Wylie
- Solicitor General for Scotland – David Brand until November; then William Stewart

=== Judiciary ===
- Lord President of the Court of Session and Lord Justice General – Lord Clyde until 25 April; then Lord Emslie
- Lord Justice Clerk – Lord Grant, then Lord Wheatley
- Chairman of the Scottish Land Court – Lord Birsay

== Events ==
- 11 February – Rockall is formally claimed as part of the United Kingdom, attached to Inverness-shire, by the Island of Rockall Act 1972.
- February – installation of "Annie's Loo", an indoor toilet in Annie Gibbons' tenement flat in the Govanhill district of Glasgow, pioneering community-based intervention in housing improvement.
- 24 May – Rangers F.C. wins the UEFA Cup Winners' Cup with a 3–2 win over Soviet side FC Dynamo Moscow in Barcelona.
- 26 May – Loch Lomond Bear Park opened near Balloch to display bears.
- 27 June – Highland Wildlife Park opened near Kingussie to display native species.
- 25 August – Kilbirnie Street fire in Glasgow: 7 firemen killed in a flashover.
- 1 September – Raising of school-leaving age from fifteen to sixteen for pupils leaving school at the end of the academic year, in common with the rest of the UK.
- 5 October – last ship launched at the former John Brown & Company Clydebank yard, Clyde-class bulk grain carrier MV Alisa.
- 8 December – Wendy Wood begins a hunger strike for home rule.
- December – Gartnavel General Hospital opens in Glasgow.
- Anderston Centre opens in Glasgow.
- The West Highland Free Press newspaper is founded at Broadford, Skye.
- Hamilton Academy closes (founded 1588)

== Births ==
- 23 January – Ewen Bremner, actor
- 20 February – Neil Primrose, musician
- 25 March – Phil O'Donnell, footballer (died 2007)
- 8 April – Lisa Cameron, Scottish National Party Member of Parliament for East Kilbride, Strathaven and Lesmahagow, 2015- , and clinical psychologist
- 9 April – Neve McIntosh, actress
- 10 April – Gordon Buchanan, wildlife film-maker
- 1 May – Patrick Grant, men's fashion designer
- 15 May – Danny Alexander, Liberal Democrat Member of Parliament for Inverness, Nairn, Badenoch & Strathspey, 2005–15
- 2 August – Carol Monaghan, Scottish National Party Member of Parliament for Glasgow North West, 2015-
- 16 August – Frankie Boyle, comedian
- 17 August – David Ralph, field hockey forward
- 14 September – Jenny Colgan, novelist
- 2 October – John Anderson, footballer
- 20 October – Debbie McLeod, field hockey goalkeeper
- 29 November – Willie Bain, Scottish Labour Party politician and Member of Parliament for Glasgow North East, 2009-

== Deaths ==
- 15 March – Jimmy Simpson, international footballer (born 1908)
- 28 March – Duncan Campbell, revivalist (born 1898)
- 4 June – David Ross Lauder, recipient of the Victoria Cross (born 1894)
- 19 November – William Grant, Lord Grant, serving Lord Justice Clerk and former Lord Advocate (born 1909)
- 30 November – Compton Mackenzie, novelist and Scottish nationalist (born 1883 in West Hartlepool)
- 27 December – John Kerr, cricketer (born 1885)
- Jimmy MacBeath, folk singer (born 1894)

== The arts ==
- George Mackay Brown's novel Greenvoe is published.
- Bill Bryden's play Willie Rough is staged by the Royal Lyceum Theatre in Edinburgh.
- The Average White Band is formed in Dundee.
- The pipe band of the Royal Scots Dragoon Guards release their instrumental recording of "Amazing Grace" which reaches No. 1 in the UK Singles Chart in April.

== See also ==
- 1972 in Northern Ireland
