= 1981 in Scotland =

- Centuries: 18th; 19th; 20th; 21st
- Decades: 1960s; 1970s; 1980s; 1990s; 2000s
- See also: List of years in Scotland; Timeline of Scottish history 1981 in: The UK • England • Wales • Elsewhere; Scottish football: 1980–81 • 1981–82; 1981 in Scottish television

Events from the year 1981 in Scotland.

== Incumbents ==
- Secretary of State for Scotland and Keeper of the Great Seal – George Younger

=== Law officers ===
- Lord Advocate – Lord Mackay of Clashfern
- Solicitor General for Scotland – Nicholas Fairbairn

=== Judiciary ===
- Lord President of the Court of Session and Lord Justice General – Lord Emslie
- Lord Justice Clerk – Lord Wheatley
- Chairman of the Scottish Land Court – Lord Elliott

== Events ==
- 1 February – Decriminalisation of homosexual acts between men over 21 years of age through the Criminal Justice (Scotland) Act 1980, Section 80, which enters into force on this day.
- 5 March – The ZX81, a pioneering British home computer manufactured by Timex in Dundee, is launched by Sinclair Research, going on to sell over 1.5 million units worldwide.
- May
  - Peugeot closes the Talbot car plant at Linwood, Renfrewshire, which was opened by the Rootes Group eighteen years earlier as Scotland's only car factory.
  - Buchan Oil Field production begins in the North Sea.
- 23 May – Scotland beat England 1–0 at Wembley.
- 11 December – Closure of Bedlay Colliery, Glenboig.
- 21 December – George Wood (Aberdeen) Ltd cease trawler operations.
- Undated
  - Last manufacture of coal gas in the UK, at Millport, Isle of Cumbrae.
  - Invergordon aluminium smelter closes.
  - Livingston Skatepark opens, the first in Scotland.

== Births ==
- 15 January – Sean Lamont, rugby player
- 16 February – Alison Rowatt, field hockey midfielder
- 19 February – Mark Boyle, snooker player
- 28 February – Mark Brown, footballer
- 25 March – Emily Smith, folk singer
- 5 May – Harry Weld-Forester, cricketer
- 11 June – Alistair McGregor, field hockey goalkeeper
- 14 June – Alastair Kellock, rugby union player
- 11 August – Sandi Thom, pop singer-songwriter
- 28 August – Kezia Dugdale, leader of the Scottish Labour Party
- 7 September – Natalie McGarry, MP convicted of embezzlement
- 16 September – David Mitchell, field hockey defender
- 20 November – Scott Hutchison, indie rock singer-songwriter and visual artist (suicide 2018)
- 9 December – Gemma Fay, international football goalkeeper
- Catriona Shearer, television news presenter

== Deaths ==
- 6 January – A. J. Cronin, novelist (born 1896)
- 23 February – Nan Shepherd, novelist and poet (born 1893)
- June – Wendy Wood, nationalist campaigner (born 1892 in England)
- 22 August – Mairi Chisholm, nurse and ambulance driver in World War I, one of "The Madonnas of Pervyse" (born 1896)
- 8 September – Bill Shankly, football manager (born 1913)
- 19 October – Johnny Doyle, footballer (born 1951)
- 1 December – James Monteith Grant, herald and Lord Lyon King of Arms (born 1903)

== The arts ==
- 30 March – release of historical drama film Chariots of Fire that tells the story of devout Christian Eric Liddell competing in the 1924 Olympics.
- 23 April – release of romantic comedy film Gregory's Girl.
- Alasdair Gray's first novel Lanark: A Life in Four Books is published in Edinburgh.
- Perrier Comedy Awards first presented to the best shows on the Edinburgh Festival Fringe.
- The Bluebells formed.
- First Fèis Bharraigh.

== See also ==
- 1981 in Northern Ireland
- 1981 in Wales
