= 1979 in Scotland =

- Centuries: 18th; 19th; 20th; 21st
- Decades: 1950s; 1960s; 1970s; 1980s; 1990s
- See also: List of years in Scotland; Timeline of Scottish history 1979 in: The UK • England • Wales • Elsewhere; Scottish football: 1978–79 • 1979–80; 1979 in Scottish television

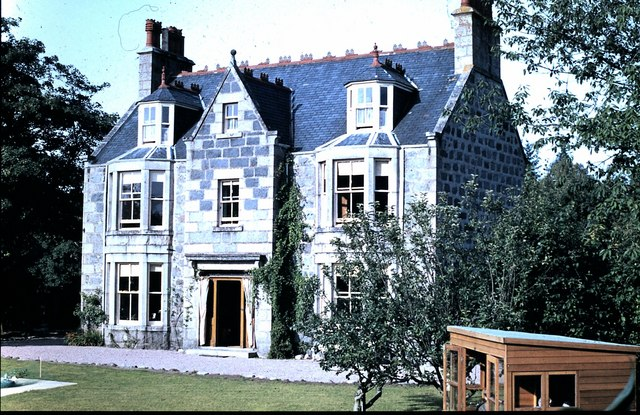
Alma House, Torphins (1979)

Events from the year 1979 in Scotland.

== Incumbents ==
- Secretary of State for Scotland and Keeper of the Great Seal – Bruce Millan until 4 May; then George Younger

=== Law officers ===
- Lord Advocate – Ronald King Murray; then Lord Mackay of Clashfern
- Solicitor General for Scotland – Lord McCluskey; then Nicholas Fairbairn

=== Judiciary ===
- Lord President of the Court of Session and Lord Justice General – Lord Emslie
- Lord Justice Clerk – Lord Wheatley
- Chairman of the Scottish Land Court – Lord Elliott

== Events ==
- 1 March – Scottish devolution referendum: Scotland votes by a majority of 77,437 for a Scottish Assembly, which is not implemented at this time due to a condition that at least 40% of the electorate must support the proposal. A devolved parliament known as the Scottish Executive, would not be established until 1 May 1999, under the conditions of the Scotland Act 1998, following a successful referendum on the issue in 1997.
- 17 March – Penmanshiel Tunnel collapses during reconstruction, killing two workers. A replacement tunnel opens to rail traffic on 20 August.
- 12 April – Cromarty Bridge opens.
- 16 April – Paisley Gilmour Street rail accident: Seven killed in a head-on collision.
- 4 May – UK general election: The Labour Party wins a majority of seats in Scotland but the Conservatives win by a 43-seat majority across the UK as a whole, with Margaret Thatcher becoming the first female Prime Minister; remaining as head of government until her resignation in 1990. George Younger is appointed Secretary of State for Scotland, an office he will hold until January 1986.
- 7 June – The first election is held for the European Parliament, with the Conservatives winning five, Labour winning two and the Scottish National Party winning one of the 8 seats available in Scotland.
- 12 June – The Tayberry is patented.
- 29 June – The search is called off for the crew from the fishing vessel Carinthia lost off the Orkney Islands, with all six men presumed dead.
- 8 September – Wolverhampton Wanderers F.C. set a new UK transfer record by paying just under £1,500,000 for Glasgow-born Aston Villa and Scotland striker Andy Gray.
- Property on Raasay is sold to the Highlands and Islands Development Board.

== Births ==
- 23 January – Dawn O'Porter, née Porter, television presenter and novelist
- 2 February – David Paisley, actor
- 15 February
  - Scott Severin, footballer
  - Gordon Shedden, racing driver
  - Pauline McFadyen, synchronised swimmer
- 22 February – Claire Johnston, lawn bowler
- 20 April
  - Gregor Tait, swimmer
  - Ruth Connell, actress and producer
- 21 April – James McAvoy, actor
- 11 May – Tim Baillie, slalom canoer
- 15 May – James Mackenzie, actor and television presenter
- 9 June – Fraser Watts, cricketer
- 20 June – Julie Fowlis, folk singer
- 31 August – Simon Neil, singer-songwriter
- 23 December – Kenny Miller, association football player

== Deaths ==
- 24 February – Sir James Hutchison, 1st Baronet, shipbuilder, army officer and politician (born 1893)
- 16 September – Marion Cameron Gray, mathematician (born 1902)
- 27 September – Jimmy McCulloch, musician (born 1953)

== The arts ==
- Alternative rock trio Cocteau Twins is formed in Grangemouth.
- National Youth Orchestra of Scotland is formed.
- Pier Arts Centre established in Stromness to display the collection of modern British art donated by Margaret Gardiner.

== See also ==
- 1979 in Northern Ireland
