= 1980 in Scotland =

- Centuries: 18th; 19th; 20th; 21st
- Decades: 1960s; 1970s; 1980s; 1990s; 2000s
- See also: List of years in Scotland; Timeline of Scottish history 1980 in: The UK • England • Wales • Elsewhere; Scottish football: 1979–80 • 1980–81; 1980 in Scottish television

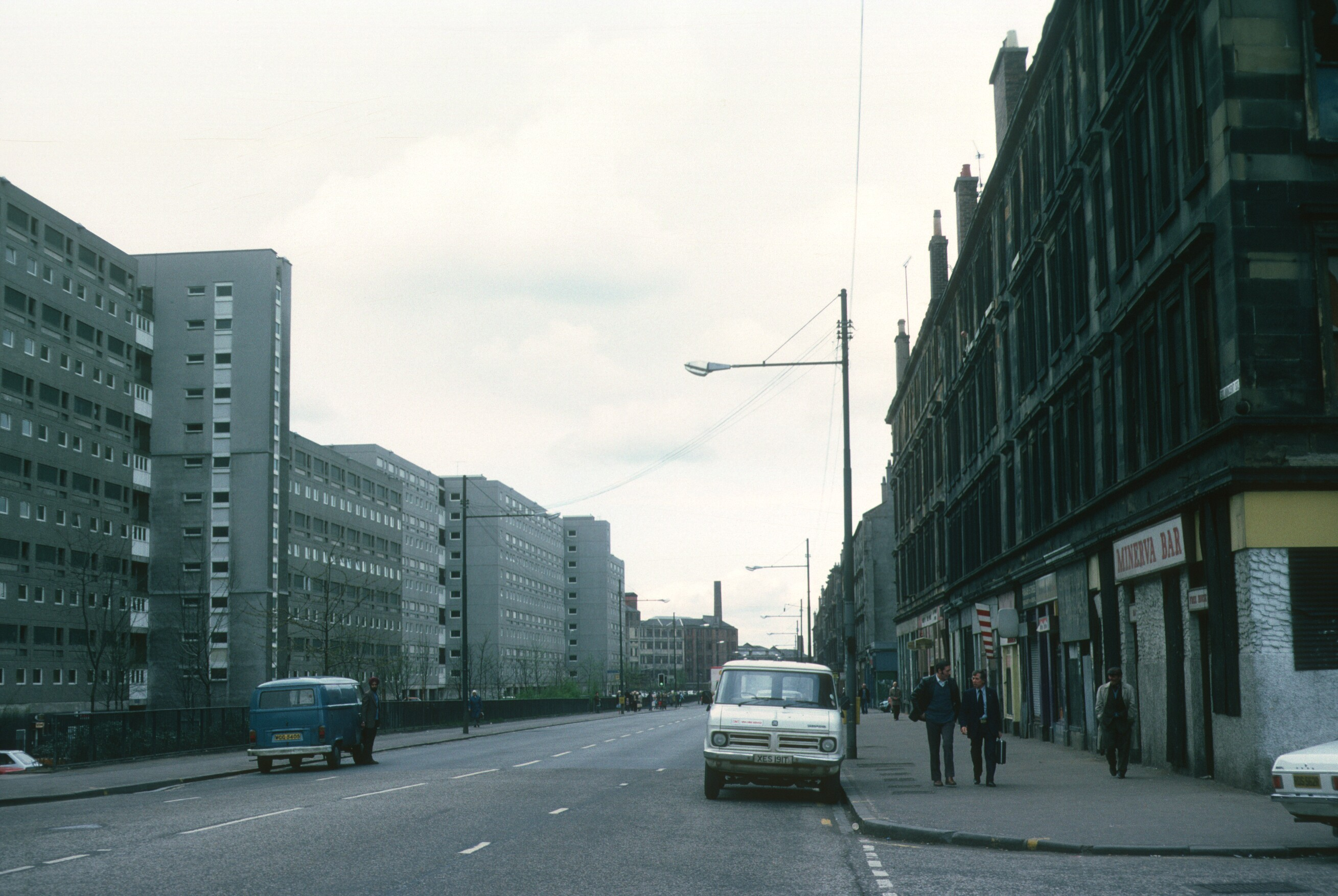
Anderston, Glasgow in 1980

Events from the year 1980 in Scotland.

== Incumbents ==
- Secretary of State for Scotland and Keeper of the Great Seal – George Younger

=== Law officers ===
- Lord Advocate – Lord Mackay of Clashfern
- Solicitor General for Scotland – Nicholas Fairbairn

=== Judiciary ===
- Lord President of the Court of Session and Lord Justice General – Lord Emslie
- Lord Justice Clerk – Lord Wheatley
- Chairman of the Scottish Land Court – Lord Elliott

== Events ==
- 16 April – Glasgow Subway reopened to passengers after a 3-year modernisation project.
- 1 May – Scottish District local elections result in big gains for the Labour Party.
- 7 May – Aberdeen F.C. secures the Scottish Football League Premier Division championship.
- 26 June – The Glasgow Central by-election is held, with Labour retaining the seat despite a 14% swing to the Scottish National Party.
- 1 August – The Education (Scotland) Act 1980 receives Royal Assent.
- 28 August – First clinically useful image of a patient's internal tissues using magnetic resonance imaging (MRI) is obtained using a full-body scanner built by a team led by John Mallard at the University of Aberdeen.
- 4–5 September – Margaret Thatcher becomes the first serving Prime Minister of the United Kingdom to visit Shetland.
- 13 September – Hercules, a bear which had gone missing on the island of Benbecula while filming a Kleenex advertisement, is found.
- 6 October – West Highland Way opened as the first of the official Long Distance Routes for walkers in Scotland.
- 9 October – Gloagtrotter of Perth, trading as GT Coaches, begins operation of an express coach service from Dundee to London as The Stage Coach, origin of the Stagecoach Group.
- October – Albion Motors' Scotstoun works closes and manufacture of complete vehicles (on Viking bus chassis) is moved to Leyland in England.
- 13 November – Criminal Justice (Scotland) Act 1980 which would decriminalise private homosexual acts between two consenting persons aged over 21 in Scotland passes at Westminster. It would take effect on 1 February 1981.

== Births ==
- 5 January – Greg McHugh, television actor and writer
- 5 February – Jo Swinson, leader of the Liberal Democrats (UK)
- 2 April – Adam Fleming, television journalist
- 30 April – Sam Heughan, actor
- 12 May – Andrew Abercromby, biomedical engineer
- 6 July – Kenny Deuchar, footballer
- 27 August – Caroline Brown, lawn bowler
- 15 September – Chris Clark, footballer
- 19 August – Darius Campbell Danesh, singer-songwriter and actor (died 2022 in the United States)
- 12 October – Lesley Paterson, triathlete, screenwriter and producer
- 26 October – Khalid Abdalla, actor
- 20 November – Malachy Tallack, journalist and folk rock musician
- 13 December – Gary Innes, piano-accordionist, shinty player and BBC broadcaster
- Kerry Hudson, writer

== Deaths ==
- 19 February – Bon Scott, Australian rock singer (born 1946)
- 29 February – Margaret Morris, choreographer (born 1891 in London)
- 3 April – Isla Cameron, actress and singer (born 1927)
- 4 May – Joe "Mr Piano" Henderson (born 1920)
- 23 June – John Laurie, actor (born 1897)
- 6 December – Margot Bennett, crime novelist (born 1912)
- 13 December – R. D. Low, comics writer and editor (born 1895)
- date unknown – Hector MacAndrew, fiddler (born 1903)

== The arts ==
- 19 February – Scottish Television begins to air the soap opera Take the High Road.
- Spring – Bearsden post-punk band Orange Juice release Falling and Laughing, the first release on the Postcard Records label.
- June – Peter Maxwell Davies's The Yellow Cake Revue (including the piano interlude "Farewell to Stromness") is premiered at the Stromness Hotel as part of the St Magnus Festival.
- Alexander Moffat paints Poets' Pub.
- Buxton Orr composes A Caledonian Suite.

== See also ==
- 1980 in Northern Ireland
