= 1978 in Scotland =

- Centuries: 18th; 19th; 20th; 21st
- Decades: 1950s; 1960s; 1970s; 1980s; 1990s
- See also: List of years in Scotland; Timeline of Scottish history 1978 in: The UK • Wales • Elsewhere; Scottish football: 1977–78 • 1978–79; 1978 in Scottish television

Events from the year 1978 in Scotland.

== Incumbents ==
- Secretary of State for Scotland and Keeper of the Great Seal – Bruce Millan

=== Law officers ===
- Lord Advocate – Ronald King Murray
- Solicitor General for Scotland – Lord McCluskey

=== Judiciary ===
- Lord President of the Court of Session and Lord Justice General – Lord Emslie
- Lord Justice Clerk – Lord Wheatley
- Chairman of the Scottish Land Court – Lord Birsay, then Lord Elliott

== Events ==
- 9 February – Gordon McQueen, 25-year-old Scotland central defender, becomes Britain's first £500,000 footballer in a transfer from Leeds United to Manchester United.
- 13 April – Glasgow Garscadden by-election: Donald Dewar retains the seat for Labour with only a 3.6% swing to the Scottish National Party.
- 31 May – Hamilton by-election: George Robertson retains the seat for Labour, thwarting a strong challenge from the SNP.
- 16 July – the Strathspey Railway opens for regular tourist traffic, the oldest continuously operating steam-worked heritage railway in Scotland, from Boat of Garten to Aviemore.
- 31 July – the Scotland Act 1978, to establish a Scottish Assembly, receives royal assent.
- August – first production from the Dunlin oilfield in the North Sea.
- 17 October – a cull of grey seals in the Orkney and Western Islands is reduced after a public outcry.
- 26 October – Berwick and East Lothian by-election: Labour retains the seat with a swing of 0.8% from the Conservatives.
- 25 November – first North Sea oil comes ashore at the Sullom Voe Terminal in Shetland via the Brent System pipeline.
- 4–9 December – The 1978 European Curling Championships take place in Aviemore.
- The nationalist group Siol nan Gaidheal is formed.

== Births ==
- 16 March – Anneliese Dodds, Labour and Co-operative Member of Parliament (United Kingdom), Chair of the Labour Party (UK)
- 30 March – Chris Paterson, rugby player
- 3 May – Lawrence Tynes, American football player
- 14 May – Emma Rochlin, field hockey defender
- 20 June – Julie Fowlis, Gaelic folk singer
- 21 July – Gary Teale, footballer
- 25 October – Russell Anderson, footballer
- 10 November – Ruth Davidson, leader of the Scottish Conservative and Unionist Party and Member of the Scottish Parliament
- Neil Forsyth, writer
- J. O. Morgan, poet

== Deaths ==
- 16 May – Diana Hay, 23rd Countess of Erroll, noblewoman (born 1926 in Kenya)
- 23 July – Tommy McLaren, footballer (born 1949)
- 30 July – John Mackintosh, Labour politician and advocate of devolution (born 1929)
- 9 September – Hugh MacDiarmid, poet (born 1892)

== The arts ==
- 17 January – Rock band Simple Minds make their first live performance at Glasgow's Satellite City.
- July – First Edinburgh Jazz and Blues Festival.

== See also ==
- 1978 in Northern Ireland
