= 1970 in Scotland =

- Centuries: 18th; 19th; 20th; 21st
- Decades: 1950s; 1960s; 1970s; 1980s; 1990s
- See also: List of years in Scotland; Timeline of Scottish history 1970 in: The UK • Wales • Elsewhere; Scottish football: 1969–70 • 1970–71; 1970 in Scottish television

Events from the year 1970 in Scotland.

== Incumbents ==
- Secretary of State for Scotland and Keeper of the Great Seal – Willie Ross until 20 June; then Gordon Campbell

=== Law officers ===
- Lord Advocate – Henry Wilson; then Norman Wylie
- Solicitor General for Scotland – Ewan Stewart until June; then David Brand

=== Judiciary ===
- Lord President of the Court of Session and Lord Justice General – Lord Clyde
- Lord Justice Clerk – Lord Grant
- Chairman of the Scottish Land Court – Lord Birsay

== Events ==
- 21 January – Fraserburgh lifeboat Duchess of Kent, on service to the Danish fishing vessel Opal, capsizes with the loss of five of the six crew members.
- 19 March – The South Ayrshire by-election is held. Jim Sillars retains the seat for the Labour Party.
- 24 May – The Greek Orthodox Cathedral of St Luke in Glasgow is raised to this status.
- 18 June – The 1970 general election is held. Labour wins a majority in Scotland with 48 out of the 71 seats available, but the Conservative Party wins a majority across the UK, and Edward Heath replaces Harold Wilson as Prime Minister. The Scottish National Party wins its first MP elected at a general election (Donald Stewart in the Western Isles) but Winnie Ewing loses the Hamilton seat; leaving the SNP with only a single seat.
- 26 June – The Kingston Bridge, Glasgow opens.
- 16 – 25 July: the 1970 British Commonwealth Games are held in Edinburgh.
- 26 July – 1 August – the 1970 Commonwealth Paraplegic Games are held in Edinburgh.
- 7 October – BP announces the discovery of the massive Forties Oil Field in Scottish waters.
- Hepatitis B outbreak in Edinburgh.
- Blair Drummond Safari Park opens.

== Births ==
- 14 February – Paul Rutherford, powerlifter
- 16 April – James Watson, actor
- 10 May – David Weir, international footballer
- 4 July
  - Lewis MacLeod, voice actor
  - Doddie Weir, rugby union player (died 2022)
- 19 July – Nicola Sturgeon, SNP politician, First Minister of Scotland (2014– ; Deputy from 2007)
- 21 July – Angus MacNeil, SNP politician
- 12 August – Alan Brown, SNP politician
- 21 August – David Hopkin, footballer
- 22 July – Doug Johnstone, crime fiction writer, rock musician and physicist
- 17 September – Dallas Campbell, television presenter
- 17 December – Stella Tennant, model (died 2020)
- 23 December – Karine Polwart, singer-songwriter

== Deaths ==
- 25 May – Tom Patey, mountaineer (born 1932), died in climbing accident
- 13 June – John Nicholson, footballer (born 1888)

== See also ==
- 1970 in Northern Ireland
- 1970 in Wales
