= 1973 in Scotland =

- Centuries: 18th; 19th; 20th; 21st
- Decades: 1950s; 1960s; 1970s; 1980s; 1990s
- See also: List of years in Scotland; Timeline of Scottish history 1973 in: The UK • Wales • Elsewhere; Scottish football: 1972–73 • 1973–74; 1973 in Scottish television

Events from the year 1973 in Scotland.

== Incumbents ==
- Secretary of State for Scotland and Keeper of the Great Seal – Gordon Campbell

=== Law officers ===
- Lord Advocate – Norman Wylie
- Solicitor General for Scotland – William Stewart

=== Judiciary ===
- Lord President of the Court of Session and Lord Justice General – Lord Emslie
- Lord Justice Clerk – Lord Wheatley
- Chairman of the Scottish Land Court – Lord Birsay

== Events ==
- 1 January – Most of the west coast shipping services of David MacBrayne are merged with those of the Caledonian Steam Packet Company as Caledonian MacBrayne.
- 1 March – Dundee East by-election: Labour retains the seat by only 1,141 votes in the face of a strong challenge from the Scottish National Party.
- May – The Co-operative Group: The Scottish Co-operative (Wholesale) Society Ltd merges into the UK-wide Co-operative Wholesale Society Ltd following serious financial mismanagement of the SCWS Bank.
- 17 July – Stonehouse, South Lanarkshire, is formally designated as a new town but never developed.
- 25 October – Local Government (Scotland) Act initiates a major reorganisation of local government in Scotland with effect from May 1975.
- 26 October – Firefighters in Glasgow stage a one-day strike following a pay dispute. Soldiers are drafted in to run the fire stations as an essential emergency service.
- 31 October – The Kilbrandon Report is published and recommends the establishment of a directly elected Scottish Assembly. This ultimately comes to fruition a quarter of a century later, under the terms of the Scotland Act 1998, on 1 May 1999.
- 8 November – Glasgow Govan by-election results in Margo MacDonald of the Scottish National Party gaining the seat from Labour with a 26.7% swing. At another Scottish by-election the same day, the Conservatives retain Edinburgh North.
- 14 December – Third (replacement) Bonar Bridge opened.
- 21 December – Armed robbery of British Rail Engineering Limited in Glasgow, in which James Kennedy, a security guard, is killed, earning a posthumous George Cross for his gallantry.
- 31 December – Radio Clyde begins broadcasting, from Clydebank.
- The Church of Scotland introduces the Church Hymnary, third edition, an entirely new compilation.

== Births ==
- 20 January – Stephen Crabb, Welsh Conservative politician
- 18 March – Patrick Harvie, Green politician
- 10 May – Dario Franchitti, racing driver
- 14 May – Fraser Nelson, political journalist
- 26 May – Julie Wilson Nimmo, actress
- 15 September – Alyn Smith, SNP MEP, MP
- 24 September – Gillian Lindsay, rower
- 5 October – Kay Moran, lawn bowler
- 13 October – Peter Dumbreck, racing driver
- Iain Finlay Macleod, playwright and novelist

== Deaths ==
- 15 January – Neil M. Gunn, novelist, critic and dramatist (born 1891)
- 22 February – F. Marian McNeill, folklorist (born 1885)
- 23 September – A. S. Neill, progressive educator and author (born 1883)
- 8 October – John Rankin, Labour politician (born 1890)
- 5 December – Robert Watson-Watt, pioneer of radar (born 1892)
- 21 December – James Kennedy, security guard murdered in raid (born 1930)
- 30 December
  - D. E. Stevenson (Dorothy Peploe), romantic novelist (born 1892)
  - Vagaland (Thomas Alexander Robertson), Shetland dialect poet (born 1909)
- Sir William Gillies, painter (born 1898)

== The arts ==
- 31 March – John McGrath's play The Cheviot, the Stag, and the Black Black Oil is premiered by 7:84 in Aberdeen.
- 11 May–8 June – The political thriller Scotch on the Rocks, concerning a terrorist group fighting for Scottish independence in the near future, is broadcast by BBC Scotland.
- Canongate Books is established as a publisher in Edinburgh.
- George Mackay Brown's novel Magnus is published.
- Celtic rock group Runrig formed on Skye.

== See also ==
- 1973 in Northern Ireland
