= 1906 in Scotland =

- Centuries: 18th; 19th; 20th; 21st
- Decades: 1880s; 1890s; 1900s; 1910s; 1920s
- See also: List of years in Scotland; Timeline of Scottish history 1906 in: The UK • Wales • Elsewhere; Scottish football: 1905–06 • 1906–07

Events from the year 1906 in Scotland.

== Incumbents ==
- Secretary for Scotland and Keeper of the Great Seal – John Sinclair

=== Law officers ===
- Lord Advocate – Thomas Shaw
- Solicitor General for Scotland – Alexander Ure

=== Judiciary ===
- Lord President of the Court of Session and Lord Justice General – Lord Dunedin
- Lord Justice Clerk – Lord Kingsburgh

== Events ==
- 27 January – Canadian Pacific steamship RMS Empress of Ireland is launched at the Fairfield Shipbuilding and Engineering Company's yard at Govan.
- 23 May – Boyd's Automatic tide signalling apparatus is inaugurated at Irvine, North Ayrshire.
- 7 June – Cunard liner RMS Lusitania is launched at John Brown & Company's shipyard at Clydebank as the world's largest ship.
- 26 June – new Argyll Motor Works is opened for production of the Argyll car at Alexandria, West Dunbartonshire.
- 19 July – 1906 Dundee fire: a major fire breaks out in a bonded warehouse.
- 18 August – Campbeltown and Machrihanish Light Railway opened to passengers.
- 21 August – the Education of Defective Children (Scotland) Act, a permissive act allowing local school boards, either alone or in combination, to make special provision for the education and medical inspection of 'epileptic, crippled or defective' children between the ages of 5 and 16.
- 28 December – Elliot Junction rail accident between Arbroath and Carnoustie railway stations kills 22.
- David MacBrayne inaugurate their first motor bus service with a Fort William to Ballachulish route.
- Yarrow Shipbuilders begin their move from London to Scotstoun.
- Rest and Be Thankful Speed Hill Climb first held.

== Births ==
- 6 January – Molly Urquhart, actress (died 1977)
- 4 March – Fionn MacColla, novelist connected to the Scottish Renaissance (died 1975)
- 13 March – Alex Massie, international footballer (died 1977)
- 22 June – Gilbert Highet, Scottish-American classicist, academic, writer, intellectual, critic and literary historian (died 1978 in the United States)
- 26 June – Joan du Plat Taylor, pioneer of maritime archaeology (died 1983)
- 1 July – Ritchie Calder, socialist author, journalist and academic (died 1982)
- 18 July – Belle Stewart, née McGregor, traditional singer (died 1997)
- 29 July – Ian Gordon Lindsay, architect (died 1966)
- 30 September – J. I. M. Stewart, novelist and academic critic (died 1994)
- 1 October – John Lorne Campbell, folklorist (died 1996 in Italy)
- 12 December – Robert Matthew, modernist architect (died 1975)

== Deaths ==
- 15 May – James Blyth, electrical engineer (born 1839)
- 30 November – William Stewart Ross, writer and publisher (born 1844)

== The arts ==
- 3 December – His Majesty's Theatre opens in Aberdeen.
- Stan Laurel makes his stage debut, at the Britannia Panopticon in Glasgow.
- Hugh S. Roberton forms the Glasgow Orpheus Choir.

== See also ==
- Timeline of Scottish history
- 1906 in Ireland
