= 1968 in Scotland =

- Centuries: 18th; 19th; 20th; 21st
- Decades: 1940s; 1950s; 1960s; 1970s; 1980s
- See also: List of years in Scotland; Timeline of Scottish history 1968 in: The UK • Wales • Elsewhere; Scottish football: 1967–68 • 1968–69; 1968 in Scottish television

Events from the year 1968 in Scotland.

== Incumbents ==
- Secretary of State for Scotland and Keeper of the Great Seal – Willie Ross

=== Law officers ===
- Lord Advocate – Henry Wilson
- Solicitor General for Scotland – Ewan Stewart

=== Judiciary ===
- Lord President of the Court of Session and Lord Justice General – Lord Clyde
- Lord Justice Clerk – Lord Grant
- Chairman of the Scottish Land Court – Lord Birsay

== Events ==
- 15 January – 1968 Scotland storm ("Great Glasgow storm") leaves 20 dead across central Scotland including 9 in Glasgow.
- February – Upper Clyde Shipbuilders formed with 48.4% government holding by amalgamation of Fairfields, Govan; Alexander Stephen & Sons, Linthouse; John Brown & Company, Clydebank; Charles Connell and Company, Scotstoun; and Yarrow Shipbuilders.
- 1 April – Reporting Scotland, BBC Scotland's national television news programme, is broadcast for the first time.
- 14 May – Murder of Maxwell Garvie: Mariticide in Kincardineshire.
- 18 May – Declaration of Perth: Conservative Party leader, Edward Heath proposes a directly elected Scottish Assembly.
- 22 May – The General Assembly of the Church of Scotland permits the ordination of women as ministers.
- 4 June – General Post Office introduces the first postbus in Scotland, Dunbar–Innerwick–Spott, East Lothian.
- 18 November – James Watt Street fire: A warehouse fire in Glasgow kills 22.
- Bluevale and Whitevale Towers, 298 ft (90.8 m) blocks of flats, completed in Glasgow.

== Births ==
- 31 January – John Collins, international footballer
- 4 March – Christina McKelvie, Scottish Government minister (died 2025)
- 16 March – David MacMillan, Scottish-born organic chemist, recipient of Nobel Prize in Chemistry
- 26 April – Daniela Nardini, actress
- 5 August – Colin McRae, rally driver (killed in helicopter accident 2007)
- 2 September – David Dinsmore, journalist
- 6 September – Christopher Brookmyre, detective novelist
- 25 October – Jason Leitch, National Clinical Director of the Scottish Government
- 22 November – Sarah Smith, television and radio news reporter
- 23 November – Kirsty Young, television and radio presenter
- 28 December – Pauline Robertson, field hockey player
- Andrew O'Hagan, writer
- Frank Quitely (Vincent Deighan), comic book artist

== Deaths ==
- 17 February – Alexander Gray, economist, poet and translator (born 1882)
- 7 April – Jim Clark, racing car driver (born 1936; killed in motor racing accident)
- 12 September – Tommy Armour, golfer (born 1894)
- 13 November – Joe Corrie, miner, poet and playwright (born 1894)

== See also ==
- 1968 in Northern Ireland
