= Paul Rutherford =

Paul Rutherford may refer to:

- Paul Rutherford (trombonist) (1940–2007), English jazz musician
- Paul Rutherford (singer) (born 1959), English singer and musician from Frankie Goes to Hollywood
- Paul Rutherford (powerlifter) (born 1970), Scottish powerlifter
- Paul Rutherford (footballer) (born 1987), English footballer
