= 1957 in Scotland =

- Centuries: 18th; 19th; 20th; 21st
- Decades: 1930s; 1940s; 1950s; 1960s; 1970s
- See also: List of years in Scotland; Timeline of Scottish history 1957 in: The UK • Wales • Elsewhere; Scottish football: 1956–57 • 1957–58; 1957 in Scottish television

Events from the year 1957 in Scotland.

== Incumbents ==
- Secretary of State for Scotland and Keeper of the Great Seal – James Stuart until 13 January; then John Maclay

=== Law officers ===
- Lord Advocate – William Rankine Milligan
- Solicitor General for Scotland – William Grant

=== Judiciary ===
- Lord President of the Court of Session and Lord Justice General – Lord Clyde
- Lord Justice Clerk – Lord Thomson
- Chairman of the Scottish Land Court – Lord Gibson

== Events ==
- 6 January – fishery cruiser Vaila runs aground off the Isle of Lewis with the loss of 5 crew.
- 5 February – trawler Robert Limbrick runs aground on the Isle of Mull with the loss of all 12 crew.
- 29 March – the Royal Navy base at Scapa Flow in Orkney is reduced to an oil depot.
- 9 May – a major fire in Edinburgh destroys the premises and stock of William Mutrie & Sons, theatrical costumiers, at Bell's Brae.
- 16 August – the world's first Museum of Childhood (established by optician Patrick Murray) opens in its own premises on Edinburgh's Royal Mile.
- 31 August – central Scotland's independent channel, Scottish Television, goes on air.
- 18 September – the sports programme Scotsport begins airing on Scottish Television; by the time it ends in 2008 it is recognised as the world's longest running television sports magazine.
- 1 October – transfer of criminally insane prisoners from the criminal lunatic department at HM Prison Perth to the State Institution for Mental Defectives at Carstairs which becomes the State Mental Hospital.
- 5 October – RAF Saxa Vord radar station on Unst is returned to fully operational status.
- 18 October – a Royal Air Force Gloster Meteor jet trainer aircraft crashes near Kirkcaldy with the loss of her 2 crew.
- 1 November – a replacement "Bawbee Brig" is opened across the River Leven, Fife, to connect Leven and Methil within Levenmouth.
- 19 November – an underground explosion at Kames Colliery near Muirkirk kills 17.
- 14 December – an underground explosion at Lindsay Colliery in Fife kills 9.
- Construction of a missile testing range on South Uist begins.
- First purpose-built Kingdom Hall of Jehovah's Witnesses in Scotland completed at Riddrie, Glasgow.
- Folklorist F. Marian McNeill begins publication of The Silver Bough.

== Births ==
- 9 February – Gordon Strachan, international footballer and manager
- 27 March – Billy Mackenzie, singer (commits suicide 1997)
- 7 June –
  - Michael Bowes-Lyon, 18th Earl of Strathmore and Kinghorne, soldier and politician (died 2016)
  - Iain Gray, Scottish Labour Party leader
- 16 June – Leeona Dorrian, Lady Dorrian, Lord Justice Clerk 2016–present
- 11 July – Johann Lamont, Scottish Labour Party leader
- 17 September – Jonathan Wittenberg, rabbi
- 23 September – Fergus Ewing, Scottish National Party minister
- 6 October – Moray Hunter, comedian
- 15 October – Michael Caton-Jones, actor, director and producer
- 21 October – Irene Edgar, lawn bowler
- 22 December – Ricky Ross, singer-songwriter and broadcaster
- Blair Jenkins, broadcaster
- Alan Riach, poet and academic

== Deaths ==
- January – Harry Gordon, entertainer (born 1893)
- 21 April – John Graham Kerr, embryologist and Unionist Member of Parliament (born 1869)
- 10 June – Sir Douglas MacInnes Shaw, army officer, businessman and Unionist Member of Parliament (born 1895)
- 20 October – Jack Buchanan, actor, singer and film director (born 1891)

== The arts ==
- Song of the Clyde (setting by Ian Gourlay of lyrics by R. Y. Bell) is published.

== See also ==
- 1957 in Northern Ireland
