= 1975 in Scotland =

- Centuries: 18th; 19th; 20th; 21st
- Decades: 1950s; 1960s; 1970s; 1980s; 1990s
- See also: List of years in Scotland; Timeline of Scottish history 1975 in: The UK • Wales • Elsewhere; Scottish football: 1974–75 • 1975–76; 1975 in Scottish television

Events from the year 1975 in Scotland.

== Incumbents ==
- Secretary of State for Scotland and Keeper of the Great Seal – Willie Ross

=== Law officers ===
- Lord Advocate – Ronald King Murray
- Solicitor General for Scotland – John McCluskey

=== Judiciary ===
- Lord President of the Court of Session and Lord Justice General – Lord Emslie
- Lord Justice Clerk – Lord Wheatley
- Chairman of the Scottish Land Court – Lord Birsay

== Events ==
- January – Dounreay Prototype Fast Reactor begins to feed electric power to the National Grid.
- 22 January – Radio Forth begins broadcasting to the Edinburgh area.
- 5 May – the Scottish Daily News begins publication in Glasgow. It is Britain's first worker-controlled, mass-circulation daily, formed as a workers' cooperative by 500 staff made redundant when the Scottish Daily Express closed its printing operations in Scotland and moved to Manchester.
- 16 May – local government in Scotland reorganised under terms of the Local Government (Scotland) Act 1973: counties, large burghs and small burghs and existing districts are completely abolished and replaced by a uniform two-tier system of regional and district councils (except in the islands, which have unitary authorities). The districts of Aberdeen, Edinburgh, Dundee and Glasgow are accorded city status in the United Kingdom; Elgin and Perth lose this status (although Perth regains it later). County, burgh and amalgamated constabularies are merged into eight regional police forces.
- 11 June – the first North Sea oil is pumped ashore at the Sullom Voe Terminal in Shetland.
- 24 September – Currie-born climber Dougal Haston and Englishman Doug Scott become the first British people to reach the summit of Mount Everest via the previously unclimbed south-west face.
- 3 November – a petroleum pipeline from Cruden Bay to Grangemouth Refinery is formally opened by the Queen.
- 8 November – the Scottish Daily News ceases publication.
- 23 December – Ballachulish Bridge is opened in the West Highlands, replacing a ferry.
- 24 December – 'Great Mull Air Mystery': Peter Gibbs vanishes after taking off from Glenforsa Airfield on a solo night flight; his body is found 4 months later on a hillside.
- December – First production from the Auk oilfield in the North Sea.
- date unknown
  - Reintroduction of the white-tailed eagle to the Isle of Rùm begins.
  - John Watson's Institution in Edinburgh closes (founded 1762)

== Births ==
- 18 May – John Higgins, snooker player
- 23 June – KT Tunstall, born Kate V. Tunstall, rock singer-songwriter
- 7 July – Richard Arkless, politician
- 24 July – Laura Fraser, actress
- 28 September – Kelly Cates, née Dalglish, television sports presenter
- 9 October – Joe McFadden, actor
- 12 November – Katherine Grainger, rower
- 15 December – Ayesha Hazarika, comedian and political commentator
- Zoë Strachan, novelist

== Deaths ==
- 15 January – Sydney Goodsir Smith, Lallans poet (born 1915 in New Zealand)
- 2 March – Helen Cruickshank, poet, suffragette and nationalist (born 1886)
- 5 March – George Friel, novelist (born 1910)
- 13 March – Jeannie Robertson, folk singer (born 1908)
- 28 March – Abe Moffat, miner, trade unionist and communist activist (born 1896)
- 3 April – Mary Ure, actress (born 1933)
- 8 June – Douglas Guthrie, otolaryngologist and medical historian (born 1885)
- 21 June – Sir Robert Matthew, modernist architect (born 1906)
- 20 July – Fionn MacColla, novelist (born 1906)

== The arts ==
- John Quigley's historical novel King's Royal is published.

== See also ==
- 1975 in Northern Ireland
