= 1971 in Scotland =

- Centuries: 18th; 19th; 20th; 21st
- Decades: 1950s; 1960s; 1970s; 1980s; 1990s
- See also: List of years in Scotland; Timeline of Scottish history 1971 in: The UK • Wales • Elsewhere; Scottish football: 1970–71 • 1971–72; 1971 in Scottish television

Events from the year 1971 in Scotland.

== Incumbents ==
- Secretary of State for Scotland and Keeper of the Great Seal – Gordon Campbell

=== Law officers ===
- Lord Advocate – Norman Wylie
- Solicitor General for Scotland – David Brand

=== Judiciary ===
- Lord President of the Court of Session and Lord Justice General – Lord Clyde
- Lord Justice Clerk – Lord Grant
- Chairman of the Scottish Land Court – Lord Birsay

== Events ==
- 2 January – 1971 Ibrox disaster: a stairway crush at the Rangers vs. Celtic football match at Ibrox Stadium in Glasgow kills 66 and leaves many more injured.
- 10 March – 1971 Scottish soldiers' killings: three young off-duty Royal Highland Fusiliers are lured from a bar in Belfast and shot by the Provisional Irish Republican Army in The Troubles in Northern Ireland.
- 23 May – "The Unknown Bairn": The drowned body of a young boy is found washed up onshore at Tayport; he is never identified.
- 25 May – production begins at the Invergordon aluminium works.
- 15 June – Upper Clyde Shipbuilders enters liquidation.
- 2 July
  - Royal Scots Dragoon Guards formed as the senior Scottish regiment of the British Army at Holyrood, Edinburgh, by amalgamation of the Royal Scots Greys and 3rd Carabiniers.
  - Erskine Bridge opened over the River Clyde.
- 30 July – Upper Clyde Shipbuilders workers begin to take control of the shipyards in a work-in under the leadership of Jimmy Reid.
- c. August – Kyle of Tongue Bridge and causeway opened, replacing a ferry.
- 16 September – Stirling and Falkirk by-election: Labour retains the seat but the Scottish National Party takes second place with a surge of 20% in their support.
- 21 October – Clarkston explosion: a gas explosion in Clarkston, East Renfrewshire kills at least twenty people.
- 22 November – Cairngorm Plateau disaster: Five children and one adult on an expedition die of exposure in the Highlands.
- 2 December – last resident families leave the island of Scarp.
- Expansion of Erskine as a planned community begins.
- Spey Bridge at Aviemore opened.
- Tom Farmer opens the first Kwik Fit car servicing centre, in Edinburgh.

== Births ==
- 21 January – Alan McManus, snooker player
- 23 March
  - Kate Dickie, actress
  - Gail Porter, television presenter and model
- 27 March – David Coulthard, racing driver
- 31 March – Ewan McGregor, actor
- 1 April – Karen Dunbar, comedian
- 5 April – Charles Cumming, espionage novelist
- 18 April – David Tennant, actor
- 31 July – Craig MacLean, track cyclist
- 19 August – Paul McGrillen, footballer (suicide 2009)
- 30 August – Julian Smith, Conservative politician
- 6 October – Brian Conaghan, young adult fiction writer
- 7 October – Aasmah Mir, journalist and presenter
- 8 October – Michelle Mone, entrepreneur
- 13 November – Alberto Costa, Conservative politician

== Deaths ==
- 16 June – John Reith, 1st Baron Reith, broadcasting executive (born 1889)
- 25 June – John Boyd Orr, physician and biologist, recipient of the Nobel Peace Prize (born 1880)
- 28 August – Edith Hughes, architect (born 1888)
- 12 December
  - Torrance Gillick, Rangers F.C. winger (born 1915)
  - Alan Morton, Rangers outside left (born 1893)
- 22 December – D. Alan Stevenson, lighthouse engineer and philatelist (born 1891)

== The arts ==
- 26 March – BBC Scotland television begins a serialisation of Lewis Grassic Gibbon's Sunset Song, starring Vivien Heilbron.
- 18 November – Stewart Conn's play The Burning, concerning King James VI of Scotland, premieres.
- Douglas Hurd and Andrew Osmond's political thriller Scotch on the Rocks, concerning a terrorist group fighting for Scottish independence in the near future, is published by Collins.
- English composer Peter Maxwell Davies settles in Orkney, initially on Hoy.

== See also ==
- 1971 in Northern Ireland
