= 1910 in Scotland =

- Centuries: 18th; 19th; 20th; 21st
- Decades: 1890s; 1900s; 1910s; 1920s; 1930s
- See also: List of years in Scotland; Timeline of Scottish history 1910 in: The UK • Wales • Elsewhere; Scottish football: 1909–10 • 1910–11

Events from the year 1910 in Scotland.

== Incumbents ==
- Secretary for Scotland and Keeper of the Great Seal – John Sinclair, 1st Baron Pentland

=== Law officers ===
- Lord Advocate – Alexander Ure
- Solicitor General for Scotland – Arthur Dewar; then William Hunter

=== Judiciary ===
- Lord President of the Court of Session and Lord Justice General – Lord Dunedin
- Lord Justice Clerk – Lord Kingsburgh

== Events ==
- June – Edinburgh Missionary Conference is held, presided over by Nobel Peace Prize recipient John R. Mott, launching the modern ecumenical movement and the modern missions movement.
- 6–13 August – First Scottish International Aviation Meeting held at Lanark.
- 17 September – Andrew Blain Baird makes the first powered monoplane flight in Scotland, at Ettrick Bay on the Isle of Bute in a self-built machine.
- 19 December – Alhambra Theatre, Glasgow opened
- The whisky-based liqueur Drambuie is first marketed commercially, from Leith.

== Births ==
- 6 May – Jerry Morris, epidemiologist (died 2009)
- 10 March – Jane Duncan, born Elizabeth Jane Cameron, novelist (died 1976)
- 17 March – Molly Weir, actress (died 2004 in London)
- 19 April – Andrew Gilchrist, Special Operations Executive operative, and later ambassador (died 1993)
- 23 April – Sheila Scott Macintyre, mathematician (died 1960)
- 15 July – George Friel, novelist (died 1975)
- 1 September – Charles Maxwell, radio producer (died 1998)
- 14 November – Norman MacCaig, poet (died 1996)
- 27 December – Ian Donald, physician, pioneer in the use of medical ultrasound (died 1987)

== Deaths ==
- 18 January – James Cuthbertson, Scottish-Australian poet and schoolteacher (born 1851)
- 2 April – William McTaggart, landscape and marine painter (born 1835)
- 6 April – John McLaren, Lord McLaren, Liberal politician (born 1831)
- 13 April – William Quiller Orchardson, portraitist and painter (born 1832)
- 15 April – John Smith, dentist, philanthropist and pioneering educator (born 1825)
- 10 May – William Gordon Stables, naval physician, novelist and pioneer caravanner (born 1840)
- 23 June – Robert Boog Watson, malacologist and Free Church minister (born 1823)

== See also ==
- Timeline of Scottish history
- 1910 in Ireland
