= 1984 in Scotland =

- Centuries: 18th; 19th; 20th; 21st
- Decades: 1960s; 1970s; 1980s; 1990s; 2000s
- See also: List of years in Scotland; Timeline of Scottish history 1984 in: The UK • England • Wales • Elsewhere; Scottish football: 1983–84 • 1984–85; 1984 in Scottish television

Events from the year 1984 in Scotland.

== Incumbents ==
- Secretary of State for Scotland and Keeper of the Great Seal – George Younger

=== Law officers ===
- Lord Advocate – Lord Mackay of Clashfern; then Lord Cameron of Lochbroom
- Solicitor General for Scotland – Peter Fraser

=== Judiciary ===
- Lord President of the Court of Session and Lord Justice General – Lord Emslie
- Lord Justice Clerk – Lord Wheatley
- Chairman of the Scottish Land Court – Lord Elliott

== Events ==
- 12 March – 1984/5 Miner's Strike: Polmaise Colliery is the first mine in Scotland to witness a walkout of its workers.
- 16 April – Culmination of the Glasgow Ice Cream Wars with the murder by arson of six members of the Doyle family.
- 3 May – 1984/5 miner's strike: Nearly 300 miners are arrested outside Ravenscraig steelworks in clashes with police as they try to stop lorries laden with coal entering.
- 14 June – Elections to the European Parliament result in Labour gaining three seats from the Conservatives to win 5 of the 8 seats in Scotland, with the Conservatives reduced to two and the SNP retaining the one they previously held.
- 30 July – Polmont rail accident at Polmont, near Falkirk, when an express train from Edinburgh to Glasgow, travelling at high speed, strikes a cow on the track near Polmont station, derailing several carriages and resulting in thirteen deaths and 61 injuries.
- 8 August – Official opening of Kylesku Bridge, replacing a ferry.
- August – Hutton oilfield production begins in the East Shetland Basin.
- Kellas cat identified as a hybrid.
- Fossil Westlothiana lizziae, one of the earliest known tetrapods, is found in East Kirkton Quarry, West Lothian.

== Births ==
- 17 January – Calvin Harris, born Adam Richard Wiles, pop singer-songwriter, record producer and DJ
- 27 February – Catriona Forrest, field hockey player
- 12 March – Neil Fachie, para-cyclist
- 8 May – Martin Compston, screen actor and footballer
- 5 September – Alison Bell, field hockey player
- 8 September – Finlay Wild, fell runner
- 25 October – Adam MacKenzie, field hockey defender
- 30 November – Alan Hutton, footballer

== Deaths ==
- 28 March – Jimmy McGowan, footballer (born 1924)
- 15 April – Alexander Trocchi, writer (born 1925)
- 6 September – Donny MacLeod, TV presenter (born 1932; heart attack)
- 11 October – Benno Schotz, sculptor (born 1891 in Germany)
- date unknown
  - Jean Bain of Crathie, Aberdeenshire, last speaker of Deeside Gaelic (born Jean McDonald, 1890)
  - George Campbell Hay, poet (born 1915)

== The arts ==
- 16 February – Iain Banks' first novel The Wasp Factory is published.
- Robert Alan Jamieson's novel Soor Hearts is published.
- James Kelman's first (published) novel The Busconductor Hines is published in Edinburgh.
- Scottish Poetry Library established.
- Puppet Animation Scotland organization is founded.

== See also ==
- 1984 in Northern Ireland
