= 1977 in Scotland =

- Centuries: 18th; 19th; 20th; 21st
- Decades: 1950s; 1960s; 1970s; 1980s; 1990s
- See also: List of years in Scotland; Timeline of Scottish history 1977 in: The UK • Wales • Elsewhere; Scottish football: 1976–77 • 1977–78; 1977 in Scottish television

Events from the year 1977 in Scotland.

== Incumbents ==
- Secretary of State for Scotland and Keeper of the Great Seal – Bruce Millan

=== Law officers ===
- Lord Advocate – Ronald King Murray
- Solicitor General for Scotland – Lord McCluskey

=== Judiciary ===
- Lord President of the Court of Session and Lord Justice General – Lord Emslie
- Lord Justice Clerk – Lord Wheatley
- Chairman of the Scottish Land Court – Lord Birsay

== Events ==
- 1 March – Long-term prohibition of directed herring fishing within the UK exclusive economic zone is introduced.
- 3 May – 1977 Scottish District Council elections held, with Labour making significant losses.
- 17 May – Queen Elizabeth II commences her formal UK 1977 Silver Jubilee tour in Glasgow.
- 18 May – Queen Elizabeth II visits Cumbernauld and Stirling.
- 19 May – Queen Elizabeth II visits Perth and Dundee.
- 21 May – Glasgow Subway closes for a three-year modernisation programme, and the original trains are withdrawn from service.
- 23–27 May – Queen Elizabeth II visits Edinburgh.
- 27 May – Queen Elizabeth II opens the new Air Terminal Building at Edinburgh Airport.
- 4 June – Scotland's 2–1 victory over England at Wembley is followed by a pitch invasion during which sections of pitch and crossbars are removed by fans.
- 10 August – Kenny Dalglish, 26-year-old Scotland striker, becomes Britain's most expensive footballer in a £440,000 transfer from Celtic F.C. to Liverpool.
- September
  - Last manufacture of coal gas on the UK mainland at Muirkirk.
  - First part of St Fergus Gas Terminal in Aberdeenshire opens.
- 12 October – Scotland beat Wales 2–0 at Anfield to qualify for the 1978 World Cup finals.
- 15–16 October – "World's End Murders" of two 17-year-old girls in Edinburgh. Christine Eadie and Helen Scott, both 17, disappear after leaving the World's End pub in Edinburgh, Scotland. Their bodies are found tied and strangled in the countryside the next day. In 2014, serial killer Angus Sinclair is convicted of the crime.
- 14 November – Tam Dalyell, Labour MP for West Lothian (UK Parliament constituency), asks what becomes known as the West Lothian question.
- Late? – Buchanan Street bus station opens in Glasgow.

== Births ==
- 19 March – Scott Wilson, footballer
- 30 March – Hugo Rifkind, journalist
- 18 April – Jonathan Rowson, chess grandmaster
- 12 May – Graeme Dott, snooker player
- 30 July – Derek Mackay, Member of Scottish Parliament and Government minister
- September – Jenni Fagan, novelist and poet
- 22 November – Neil McCallum, cricketer
- 28 November – Gavin Rae, international footballer
- 30 November – Rae Hendrie, television actress

== Deaths ==
- 6 October – Molly Urquhart, actress (born 1906)
- 30 November – Thomas Corbett, 2nd Baron Rowallan, soldier, governor and chief scout (born 1895)
- 27 December – James Marshall, international footballer (born 1908)

== The arts ==
- 19 August – Art punk band Skids, founded by Stuart Adamson, plays its first gig, in Dunfermline.
- First St Magnus Festival of the arts held on Orkney, organised by local residents including English composer Peter Maxwell Davies and Orcadian poet George Mackay Brown.

== See also ==
- 1977 in Northern Ireland
