= 1956 in Scotland =

- Centuries: 18th; 19th; 20th; 21st
- Decades: 1930s; 1940s; 1950s; 1960s; 1970s
- See also: List of years in Scotland; Timeline of Scottish history 1956 in: The UK • Wales • Elsewhere; Scottish football: 1955–56 • 1956–57; 1956 in Scottish television

Events from the year 1956 in Scotland.

== Incumbents ==
- Secretary of State for Scotland and Keeper of the Great Seal – James Stuart

=== Law officers ===
- Lord Advocate – William Rankine Milligan
- Solicitor General for Scotland – William Grant

=== Judiciary ===
- Lord President of the Court of Session and Lord Justice General – Lord Clyde
- Lord Justice Clerk – Lord Thomson
- Chairman of the Scottish Land Court – Lord Gibson

== Events ==
- 7 March – The first floodlit Scottish Football League match is played at Ibrox Park in Glasgow; home team Rangers F.C. beat Queen of the South 8–0.
- 1 June – Elsie Stephenson becomes founding director of the Nurse Teaching Unit, University of Edinburgh, the first nurse teaching unit within a British university.
- 4 July – The National Library of Scotland's first purpose-built premises are opened on George IV Bridge in Edinburgh.
- 29 July – the Ecurie Ecosse motor racing team, Ninian Sanderson and Ron Flockhart, win the 1956 24 Hours of Le Mans race.
- 14 August – death of John Crichton-Stuart, 5th Marquess of Bute (born 1904); he bequeaths the uninhabited islands of St Kilda to the National Trust for Scotland as a bird sanctuary.
- 25 September – the TAT-1 transatlantic telephone cable between the UK and North America is inaugurated; it comes ashore near Oban.
- 4 October – Prince's Cairn unveiled at Loch nan Uamh to mark the spot where Charles Edward Stuart left Scotland in 1746 after failure of the Jacobite rising of 1745.
- 20 October – Dundee Corporation Tramways last operate.
- 16 November – Edinburgh Corporation Tramways last operate. Trams return to Edinburgh after much delay on 31 May 2014.
- 2 December – in the 1956 Summer Olympics at Melbourne, Richard McTaggart of Dundee wins a gold medal in lightweight boxing.
- 10 December – Thurso life-boat destroyed when its boathouse is burnt out.
- The Scottish Medical Journal is first published in Edinburgh following merger of the Edinburgh Medical Journal and The Glasgow Medical Journal.

== Births ==
- 7 January – Ian Bell, journalist (died 2015)
- 11 January – Phyllis Logan, actress
- 12 January – Myra McFadyen, actress (died 2024)
- 22 February – Philip Kerr, writer (died 2018)
- 25 February – Davie Cooper, footballer (died 1995)
- 19 April – Anne Glover, biologist
- 7 May – Calum MacDonald, Labour MP
- 2 June – Susan Rae, radio newsreader
- 22 June - Derek Forbes, Musician
- 7 September – Robert Reed, judge, President of the Supreme Court of the United Kingdom
- 26 September – Mick Imlah, poet (died 2009 in England)
- 3 November – Cathy Jamieson, Labour MP
- 29 December – Fred MacAulay, comedian
- Lachlan Mackinnon, poet and critic

== Deaths ==
- 11 January – Buchanan Sharp, footballer (born 1894)
- 30 May – Sir John Stirling-Maxwell, 10th Baronet, Conservative politician and philanthropist (born 1866)
- 21 September – Bill Struth, football manager (born 1876)
- 6 December – Helen Duncan, medium (born 1897)

== See also ==
- 1956 in Northern Ireland
