= 1976 in Scotland =

- Centuries: 18th; 19th; 20th; 21st
- Decades: 1950s; 1960s; 1970s; 1980s; 1990s
- See also: List of years in Scotland; Timeline of Scottish history 1976 in: The UK • Wales • Elsewhere; Scottish football: 1975–76 • 1976–77; 1976 in Scottish television

Events from the year 1976 in Scotland.

== Incumbents ==
- Secretary of State for Scotland and Keeper of the Great Seal – Willie Ross until 8 April; then Bruce Millan

=== Law officers ===
- Lord Advocate – Ronald King Murray
- Solicitor General for Scotland – John McCluskey, ennobled as Lord McCluskey

=== Judiciary ===
- Lord President of the Court of Session and Lord Justice General – Lord Emslie
- Lord Justice Clerk – Lord Wheatley
- Chairman of the Scottish Land Court – Lord Birsay

== Events ==
- 18 January – The Scottish Labour Party is formed as a breakaway from the UK-wide party.
- 6 February – Hunterston B nuclear power station begins generating electricity.
- 7 July – Scottish MP David Steel is elected as new leader of the Liberal Party.
- 14 October – Post Office Telephones take the UK's last manual public telephone exchange out of service on Portree.
- 11 November – Brent oilfield production begins in the East Shetland Basin.
- 12 November – Murder of Renee and Andrew MacRae: An Inverness woman and her 3-year-old son disappear; their murderer is eventually convicted in 2022 but their bodies are never found despite being Britain's longest-running missing persons case.
- 15 November – Licensing (Scotland) Act 1976 receives royal assent, paving the way for licensed premises to open an extra hour, until 11 p.m., from 16 December, and for public houses to open on Sundays for the first time from 1977.
- 13 December — An extra hour of drinking allowed in pubs, until 11pm, from today.
- The Signet Office is merged into the Court of Session.
- Inverkip power station is commissioned.
- Whalsay Golf Club, Britain's most northerly, is founded in Shetland.

== Births ==
- 13 January – Ross McCall, actor
- 20 January – Kirsty Gallacher, television presenter
- 23 February – Kelly Macdonald, actress
- 23 March – Chris Hoy, Olympic gold medal winning cyclist
- 3 June – Gregg McClymont, historian and politician
- 5 June – Jack Ross, footballer and manager
- 19 June – Pippa Crerar, political journalist
- 20 July – Damian Barr, writer
- 4 August – Jock Zonfrillo, chef (died 2023 in Australia)
- 8 August – Laura Kuenssberg, Italian-born political journalist
- 10 August – Ian Murray, Labour MP for Edinburgh South
- 25 August – Gail McConnell, physicist
- 16 November – Danny Wallace, comedian and broadcast presenter
- Date unknown
  - Tom Gauld, comic artist
  - Chris Stout, fiddle player

== Deaths ==
- 8 January – Robert Forgan, Scottish-English physician and politician (born 1891)
- 11 February – Charlie Naughton, actor (born 1886)
- 18 February – William Robb, footballer (born 1895)
- 13 March – Ann Henderson, sculptor (born 1921)
- 28 March – Ian Garrow, army officer (born 1908)
- 22 April – Stanley Cursiter, painter and curator (born 1887)
- 28 May – Oliver Brown, nationalist political activist (born 1903)
- 20 October – Jane Duncan (Elizabeth Jane Cameron), novelist (born 1910)

== See also ==
- 1976 in Northern Ireland
- 1976 in Wales
