= James Main =

Scottish footballer

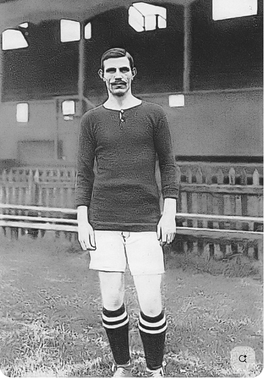

Personal information
- Date of birth: 29 May 1886
- Place of birth: West Calder, Scotland
- Date of death: 29 December 1909 (aged 23)
- Place of death: Edinburgh, Scotland
- Position: Defender

Youth career
- Mossend Juveniles
- Motherwell

Senior career*
Years	Team	Apps	(Gls)
1904–1909	Hibernian	131	(4)

International career
1908	Scottish League XI	1	(0)
1909	Scotland	1	(0)
- * Club domestic league appearances and goals

James Main (29 May 1886 – 29 December 1909) was a Scottish footballer, who played for Hibernian and the Scotland national football team as a right back. Main suffered fatal internal injuries while playing in a match on Christmas Day 1909, and died four days later.

Main signed for Hibs in 1904 from Motherwell. He played regularly for the club over the course of the next few seasons, and won international recognition when he was selected to play for Scotland in the 1909 British Home Championship match against Ireland. Scotland won the match 5–0, and Main was expected to win further honours. Main also played for the Scottish League once, in February 1908.

Main's life and career were cut short, however, when he suffered a ruptured bowel after being kicked in the stomach by Partick Thistle outside-left Frank Branscombe during a match played at Firhill on Christmas Day 1909. John Sharp, a teammate of Main, later said that the incident was an accident because the Thistle player had slipped on the icy surface before making contact. Main had returned home on the night of the game, but he was rushed to Edinburgh Royal Infirmary when the extent of his internal injuries was realised. An emergency operation was initially successful, but further treatment was ineffective and Main died from his injuries.
