= Frank Branscombe =

Scottish footballer

Personal information
- Full name: Francis Archer Branscombe
- Date of birth: 6 May 1889
- Place of birth: Dennistoun, Scotland
- Date of death: 14 April 1942 (aged 52)
- Place of death: Maryhill, Scotland
- Height: 5 ft 8 in (1.73 m)
- Position: Outside left

Senior career*
Years	Team	Apps	(Gls)
–	Clydebank Juniors		
1908–1917	Partick Thistle	182	(37)
1915–1916	Vale of Leven (loan)		
1916	Rangers (loan)	7	(5)
–	Dunkeld and Birnham		
Total		189	(42)
- * Club domestic league appearances and goals

Francis Archer Branscombe (6 May 1889 – 14 April 1942) was a Scottish footballer who played mainly as an outside left. The majority of his career was spent at Partick Thistle where he played from 1908 to 1917, making 214 appearances in all competitions and scoring 50 goals. He appeared in the finals of the Glasgow Cup in 1914 and the Glasgow Merchants Charity Cup in 1916, but finished on the losing side in both. He had loan spells with Vale of Leven and Rangers during World War I; during a six-week stint at Ibrox, he scored in five different Scottish Football League fixtures across the seven matches he played. In 1917 he left Scotland to work in the wartime munitions industry in Woolwich. He later played for amateur side Dunkeld and Birnham – in the 1923–24 Scottish Cup, he faced his former club, Partick Thistle, which won the tie 11–0.

He had a trial for the Scottish League XI in 1910 and played in the Glasgow FA's annual challenge match against Sheffield in 1914.

Branscombe was involved in a fatal accident during a match on Christmas Day 1909 when he slipped on an icy surface in a challenge for the ball with James Main of Hibernian, striking the Scotland defender in the stomach with his boot with some force. Main died from his injuries the following day. The incident affected the form of 20-year-old Branscombe for some time.
