= 1908 in Scotland =

- Centuries: 18th; 19th; 20th; 21st
- Decades: 1880s; 1890s; 1900s; 1910s; 1920s
- See also: List of years in Scotland; Timeline of Scottish history 1908 in: The UK • Wales • Elsewhere; Scottish football: 1907–08 • 1908–09

Events from the year 1908 in Scotland.

== Incumbents ==
- Secretary for Scotland and Keeper of the Great Seal – John Sinclair

=== Law officers ===
- Lord Advocate – Thomas Shaw
- Solicitor General for Scotland – Alexander Ure

=== Judiciary ===
- Lord President of the Court of Session and Lord Justice General – Lord Dunedin
- Lord Justice Clerk – Lord Kingsburgh

== Events ==
- 26 January – the 1st Glasgow Scout Group is granted the oldest Scout Group registration known.
- 25 April – Kincardineshire by-election: Arthur Murray holds the seat for the Liberal Party.
- 1 May–31 October – Scottish National Exhibition held in Saughton Park, Edinburgh.
- 9 May – Dundee by-election: Winston Churchill holds the seat for the Liberal Party.
- May – Ladies' Scottish Climbing Club formed.
- 14 July – first ship launched from Yarrow Shipbuilders' new yard at Scotstoun, the first Pará-class destroyer for the Brazilian Navy.
- 11–12 August: Sailing at the 1908 Summer Olympics: The 12-metre class is contested from Hunters Quay on the Firth of Clyde and won by Thomas C. Glen-Coats' Hera.
- Landless men from Barra who have crossed to Vatersay on a land raid in an attempt to claim land are prosecuted by the absentee landowner Emily Gordon, Lady Cathcart, and imprisoned for two months in Edinburgh, although the judge is critical of the landowner.
- St Mary's Episcopal Church in Glasgow is raised to the status of St Mary's Cathedral, Glasgow, within the Scottish Episcopal Church.
- Walter Robberds, Bishop of Brechin, becomes Primus of the Scottish Episcopal Church, an office he will hold until 1934.
- Eskdalemuir Observatory opened for geophysical and meteorological recording.
- West Highland White Terrier first so named as a breed.
- Perth Racecourse, the most northerly in Britain, opened for National Hunt racing.

== Births ==
- 20 January – Ian Peebles, cricketer (died 1980)
- 28 January – Jimmy Shand, accordionist and bandleader (died 2000)
- 2 February – J. K. Annand, poet and founding editor of Lallans magazine (died 1993)
- 15 April – Denis Devlin, Irish modernist poet and diplomat (died 1959 in Ireland)
- 22 April – Leonard Schapiro, scholar of Russian politics (died 1983 in London)
- 27 April – Mary Docherty, Communist activist (died 2000)
- 23 May – Duncan Black, economist (died 1991 in Paignton)
- 5 June – Bill Fraser, stage and screen actor (died 1987 in Hertfordshire)
- 7 June – Thomas Cook, Labour Party Member of Parliament (MP) for constituencies in Dundee 1945–52; died 1952)
- 10 June – Russell Waters, stage and screen actor (died 1982 in London)
- 12 June – Ronnie Selby Wright, Church of Scotland minister (died 1995)
- 23 August – Hannah Frank, visual artist (died 2008)
- 24 August – Ian Garrow, army officer (died 1976)
- 19 October – Sydney MacEwan, singer and priest (died 1991)
- 28 October – Angus MacVicar, writer (died 2001)
- Jeannie Robertson, folk singer (died 1975)

== Deaths ==
- 25 January – Sir Thomas McCall Anderson, professor of practice of medicine (born 1836)
- 30 January – James Bell Pettigrew, naturalist and museum curator (born 1834)
- 22 March – John William Crombie, Liberal MP for Kincardineshire (1892–1908)(born 1858)
- 24 March – Sir James David Marwick, lawyer, historian and town clerk (born 1826)
- 13 May – Louisa Stevenson, campaigner for women's rights (born 1835)
- 7 June – William Lithgow, shipbuilder (born 1854)
- 25 October – Lewis Campbell, classicist (born 1830)
- 19 December – Thomas Lomar Gray, engineer, noted for his pioneering work in seismology (born 1850)
- Joseph Henderson, artist (born 1832)
- John James Stevenson, architect (born 1831)

== The arts ==
- Mary and Jane Findlater's novel Crossriggs is published.

== See also ==
- Timeline of Scottish history
- 1908 in Ireland
