= Debbie McLeod =

Scottish field hockey player

Debbie McLeod (born 20 October 1972 in Dundee) is a female field hockey goalkeeper from Scotland. She played club hockey for Bonagrass Grove, and made her debut for the Women's National Team in 1999. McLeod works as a swimming pool technician. Her brother played national level football at U16 level.
