= 1956 in Scottish television =

This is a list of events in Scottish television from 1956.

== Events ==
- Unknown - Between 1956 and 1965, Radio Free Scotland is broadcast through the sound channel of BBC One Scotland after the channel closes down for the evening.
- Unknown - The ITV franchise for Central Scotland franchise is awarded to Scottish Television from three applications.

== Births ==
- 11 January - Phyllis Logan, actress
- 25 October - John Michie, film and television actor
- 28 November - Fiona Armstrong, television journalist
- Unknown - Colin MacDonald, radio and television writer
- 23 November - Jonathan Watson, actor

== See also ==
- 1956 in Scotland
