= 1970 in Scottish television =

This is a list of events in Scottish television from 1970.

== Events ==
- 18 June – Televised coverage of the 1970 United Kingdom general election.
- 13 November – The Colour Strike begins when ITV staff refuse to work with colour television equipment, following a dispute over pay with their management.
- Unknown – The singer David Bowie appears in a half-hour mime improv play on Scottish Television. He narrates in song, while perched on a ladder.
- Unknown – The first current affairs television series in Gaelic, Bonn Comhraidh, begins broadcasting on BBC Scotland.

== Television series ==
- Scotsport (1957–2008)
- Dr. Finlay's Casebook (1962–1971)
- Reporting Scotland (1968–1983; 1984–present)

== Ending this year ==
- The Adventures of Francie and Josie (1962–1970)

== Births ==
- 16 April - James Watson, actor
- 19 May - Sarah Heaney, television presenter
- 17 September - Dallas Campbell, television presenter
- Unknown - Frances Grey, actress
- Unknown - Matt Healy, actor

== See also ==
- 1970 in Scotland
