= Alison Rowatt =

Scottish field hockey player

Alison Rowatt (born 16 February 1981 in Rutherglen) is a female field hockey midfield player from Scotland. She played club hockey for Giffnock, and made her debut for the Women's National Team in 2000.

After retiring from field hockey, she went on to compete in triathlon.

Rowatt works as a lawyer in Edinburgh.
