= 1976 in Scottish television =

This is a list of events in Scottish television from 1976.

== Events ==
- 1 April – Debut of the Scottish soap Garnock Way, a short-lived soap that was made for ITV.
- 3 April – The first edition of BBC Scotland's rural affairs series Landward is broadcast. It was shown on Sunday lunchtimes as an opt-out, as the rest of the UK received Farming, and from 1988 Countryfile.
- 12 May – Transmission of the 1976 European Cup Final from Hampden Park, the biggest sporting outside-broadcast ever undertaken by an ITV company.

== Debuts ==
=== BBC ===
- 3 April – Landward (1976–Present)
- Unknown – Public Account (1976–1978)

=== ITV ===
- 1 April – Garnock Way (1976–1979)

== Television series ==
- Scotsport (1957–2008)
- Reporting Scotland (1968–1983; 1984–present)
- Top Club (1971–1998)
- Scotland Today (1972–2009)
- Sportscene (1975–Present)

== Ending this year ==
- 31 August – Sutherland's Law (1973–1976)

== Births ==
- 21 January – Kirsty Gallacher, television presenter
- 12 February – Jenni Falconer, television presenter
- November – Bryan Kirkwood, television producer
- Unknown – Polly Frame, actress

== Deaths ==
- 11 February – Charlie Naughton, 89, comedian

== See also ==
- 1976 in Scotland
