= Kerry Hudson =

British writer (born 1980)

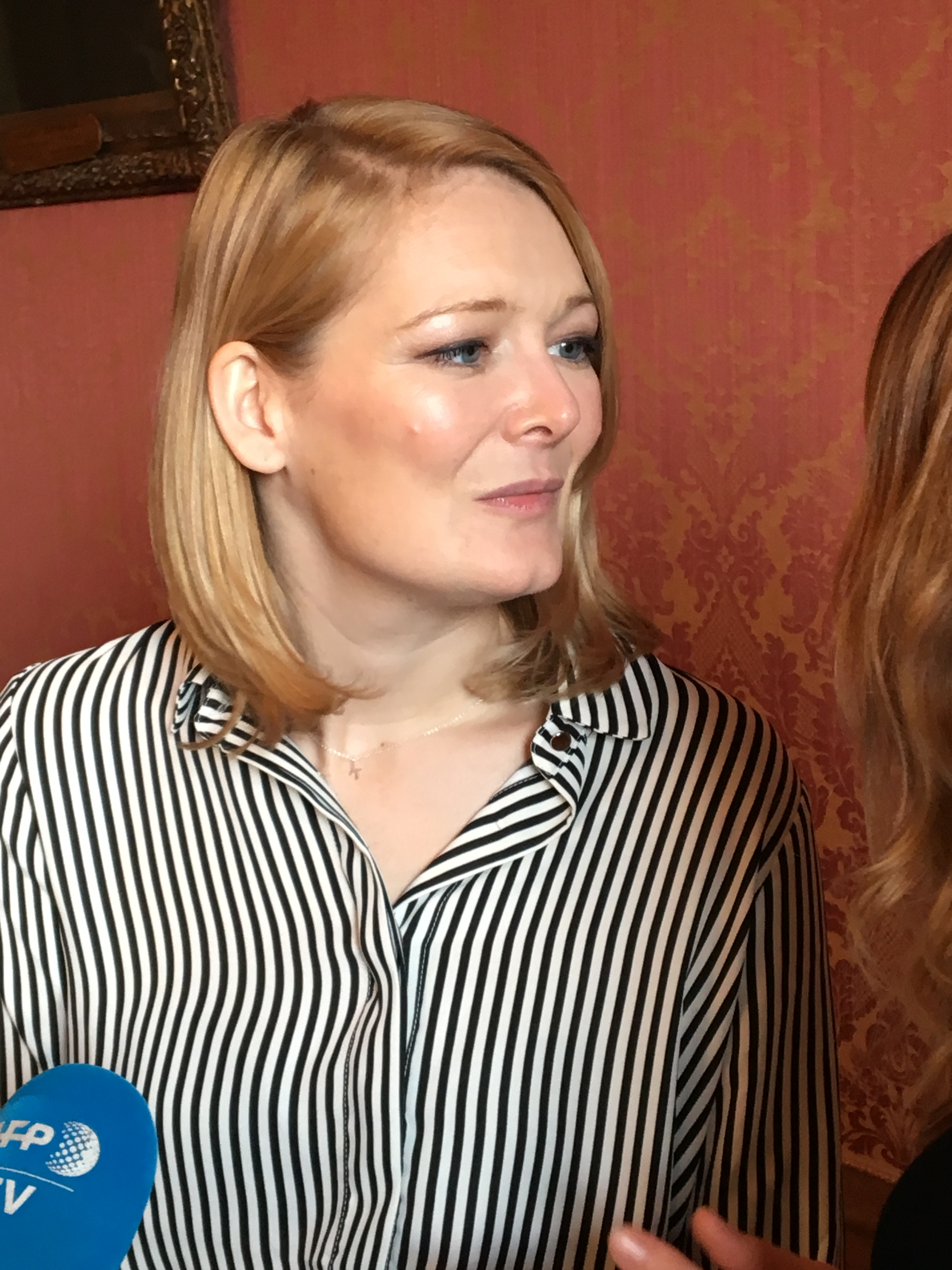
Kerry Hudson when awarded the Prix Femina Étranger in 2015

Kerry Hudson (born 1980) is a British writer. She was awarded the Prix Femina Étranger in 2015 for a translated version of Thirst (2014), La Couleur de l'eau. She was elected a Fellow of the Royal Society of Literature in 2020.

== Published works ==
=== Fiction ===
- —— (2012). Tony Hogan Bought Me an Ice Cream Float Before He Stole My Ma (paperback 1st ed.). Chatto & Windus. ISBN 9780701186395.
- —— (2014). Thirst (hardcover ed.). Chatto & Windus. ISBN 9780701188689.

=== Non-fiction ===
- —— (2019). Lowborn: Growing Up, Getting Away and Returning to Britain's Poorest Towns (paperback ed.). Chatto & Windus. ISBN 9781784742454.
- —— (2024). Newborn (hardcover 1st ed.). Chatto & Windus. ISBN 9781784744991.
