= 1972 in Scottish television =

This is a list of events in Scottish television from 1972.

== Events ==
- 1 March – Border begins broadcasting in colour transmissions from the Selkirk transmitter.
- 14 March – BBC 1 Scotland has been on air for twenty years.
- 25 March – The 17th Eurovision Song Contest is held at the Usher Hall in Edinburgh. Luxembourg wins the contest with the song "Après toi", performed by Vicky Leandros.
- 11 September – Inaugural broadcast of Scottish Television's regional news programme Scotland Today. The programme is only broadcast for ten months each year, taking a break each summer.
- Unknown – Construction begins on a new STV base in Renfield Street, Cowcaddens, Glasgow on land opposite the Theatre Royal site.

== Debuts ==
=== ITV ===
- 11 September – Scotland Today on Scottish Television (1972–2009)

== Television series ==
- Scotsport (1957–2008)
- Reporting Scotland (1968–1983; 1984–present)
- Top Club (1971–1998)

== Births ==
- 10 April – Gordon Buchanan, wildlife film-maker
- 16 August – Frankie Boyle, comedian

== Deaths ==
- 29 January – Hugh McDermott, 63, actor

== See also ==
- 1972 in Scotland
