= Nigel Emslie, Lord Emslie =

Scottish judge (born 1947)

The Right Honourable Lord Emslie

Senator of the College of Justice
- In office 2001–2012
- Nominated by: Henry McLeish; As First Minister
- Monarch: Elizabeth II
- Preceded by: Lord Prosser

Personal details
- Born: George Nigel Hannington Emslie; 17 April 1947 (age 79) Edinburgh, Scotland
- Relations: George Emslie, Baron Emslie (father); Derek Emslie, Lord Kingarth (brother)
- Education: Gonville and Caius College, Cambridge; University of Edinburgh
- Profession: Advocate

George Nigel Hannington Emslie, Lord Emslie (called Nigel; born 17 April 1947) is a retired judge of the Supreme Courts of Scotland. He is the son of former Lord President George Emslie, Baron Emslie, and older brother of fellow judge Derek Emslie, Lord Kingarth and rhino conservationist Dr Richard Emslie.

== Early life ==
Emslie was educated at the Edinburgh Academy and Trinity College, Glenalmond, before studying at Gonville and Caius College, Cambridge (BA) and the School of Law of the University of Edinburgh (LLB). He was admitted to the Faculty of Advocates in 1972, becoming a Queen's Counsel in 1986.

== Legal career ==
Emslie served as Standing Junior Counsel to the Forestry Commission and Ministry of Agriculture and Fisheries from 1981 to 1982, and to the Inland Revenue from 1982 to 1986. In 1988, he became part-time Chairman of the Medical Appeal Tribunals, serving until 1997, when he became Dean of the Faculty of Advocates, a position his father held from 1965 to 1970.

He was appointed a Senator of the College of Justice, a judge of the Court of Session and High Court of Justiciary, Scotland's supreme courts, in 2001, replacing Lord Prosser. His father was present at his installation.

In December 2010, Emslie was appointed to the Inner House of the Court of Session and consequently sworn of the Privy Council in April 2011, entitling him to the style the Right Honourable.

== Personal life ==
Lord Emslie married Heather Ann Davis in 1973; the couple have a son and two daughters. He is a member of the Hawks' Club of the University of Cambridge, and the New Club in Edinburgh.
