= 1906 Dundee fire =

Conflagration in Dundee, Scotland

Coordinates: 56.4630°N 2.9667°W

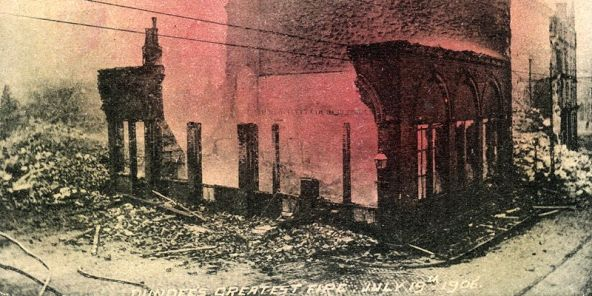
A hand-coloured postcard depicting the fire.

In July 1906, the city of Dundee was the site of a large fire caused by the ignition of a bonded warehouse. The fire, which burned for 12 hours, has been described as the most destructive fire in the history of Dundee. The fire was described by an eyewitness as sending "rivers of burning whisky" through the city.

== Background ==
James Watson and Co. were wholesale whisky merchants whose premises occupied a large site in Dundee on the corner of Trades Lane and Seagate. In 1906 about 300 people were employed by the firm. Watson and Co. were based at 97 Seagate with Customs Bond No. 4 next door at 99 Seagate.

== The Fire ==
An employee of James Watson & Co. was passing the building on the evening of 19 July 1906 when he noticed smoke emerging from its roof. The building was soon ablaze and large vats of whisky caught fire and exploded, leading to flaming alcohol raining down on surrounding streets and buildings. The fire quickly spread to other buildings. The premises of another whisky merchant in nearby Candle Lane were also destroyed. So bad was the inferno that firefighters had to be called from Edinburgh to help fight it.

The fire attracted thousands of spectators who gathered to watch the blaze and the sight of 'rivers of blue-flamed whiskey flowing into street drains'.

== Aftermath ==
At the time of the fire it was estimated that £450,000 worth of damage had been caused. The following year's Dundee Directory reported that the fire had 'desolated a large portion of the neighbourhood' around Seagate, Trades Lane and Candle Lane, and that as a result a large area for building operations had opened up. New bonds designed by David Baxter were built on the site in 1907 and are now listed buildings. Whisky blending at Watson's Bond ceased in 1981 and the bonds closed in 1987.
