= 1971 in Scottish television =

This is a list of events in Scottish television from 1971.

== Events ==
- 8 February – The Colour Strike ends after three months.
- 1 September – Border Television celebrates ten years on air. It marks the anniversary by beginning colour transmissions, albeit initially only from the Caldbeck.
- 30 September – Grampian Television celebrates ten years on air and to mark the anniversary, it begins broadcasting in colour.
- 24 December – Viewers in the Grampian Television area begin a period without any ITV services, following a walkout by members of Association of Cinematograph and Television Technicians.
- 26 December – ITV service resumes for viewers in the Grampian Television area at 10pm, after around one million viewers had no across Christmas Eve and Christmas Day.
- Unknown – BBC Scotland presents Sunset Song, a television adaptation of Lewis Grassic Gibbon's novel

== Debuts ==
=== ITV ===
- 29 July - Top Club on Grampian (1971–1998)
- 18 September - Beagan Gaidhlig

== Television series ==
- Scotsport (1957–2008)
- Reporting Scotland (1968–1983; 1984–present)

== Ending this year ==
- 3 January - Dr. Finlay's Casebook (1962–1971)

== Births ==
- 23 March - Gail Porter, television presenter
- 18 April - David Tennant, actor
- 30 November - Sanjeev Kohli, writer, comedian and actor
- Unknown - Kate Dickie, actress
- Unknown - Martin Geissler, actor

== See also ==
- 1971 in Scotland
