= 1968 in Scottish television =

This is a list of events in Scottish television from 1968.

== Events ==
- 1 April - Debut of BBC Scotland's national news programme Reporting Scotland.
- Unknown -
  - Scottish Television introduces afternoon programming as its licence remit increases by three and a half hours a week.
  - All three of Scotland's ITV contractors retain their franchises in the latest round of franchise decisions.
  - Debut of current affairs programme Current Account.

== Debuts ==
=== BBC ===
- 1 April - Reporting Scotland on BBC 1 (1968–1983; 1984–present)

== Television series ==
- Scotsport (1957–2008)
- Dr. Finlay's Casebook (1962–1971)
- The Adventures of Francie and Josie (1962–1970)

== Ending this year ==
- The White Heather Club (1958–1968)

== Births ==
- 11 August - Gray O'Brien, actor
- 13 October - Alex Ferns, actor
- 22 November - Sarah Smith, news reporter
- 23 November - Kirsty Young, journalist and television presenter

== See also ==
- 1968 in Scotland
