= 1973 in Scottish television =

This is a list of events in Scottish television from 1973.

== Events ==
- Spring - BBC television airs a serial version of Douglas Hurd's novel Scotch on the Rocks

== Debuts ==
=== BBC ===
- Spring - Scotch on the Rocks
- Unknown - Sutherland's Law (1973–1976)

== Television series ==
- Scotsport (1957–2008)
- Reporting Scotland (1968–1983; 1984–present)
- Top Club (1971–1998)
- Scotland Today (1972–2009)

== Births ==
- 9 August - Kevin McKidd, actor
- Unknown - Sarah Mack, journalist and presenter

== See also ==
- 1973 in Scotland
