= Derek Emslie, Lord Kingarth =

The Right Honourable Lord Kingarth

Senator of the College of Justice
- In office 1997–2010
- Monarch: Elizabeth

Personal details
- Born: Derek Robert Alexander Emslie; 21 June 1949 (age 77) Edinburgh, Scotland
- Spouse: Elizabeth Carstairs
- Relations: George Emslie, Baron Emslie (father); Nigel Emslie, Lord Emslie (brother)
- Education: Gonville and Caius College, Cambridge; University of Edinburgh
- Profession: Advocate

Derek Robert Alexander Emslie, Lord Kingarth (born 21 June 1949) is a judge of the Supreme Courts of Scotland, sitting in the High Court of Justiciary and the Inner House of the Court of Session. He is the son of former Lord President George Emslie, Baron Emslie, and younger brother of fellow judge Nigel Emslie, Lord Emslie, and older brother of rhino conservationist Dr Richard Emslie.

== Early life ==
Emslie was educated at the Edinburgh Academy and Trinity College, Glenalmond, before studying at Gonville and Caius College, Cambridge (BA) and the School of Law of the University of Edinburgh (LLB). He was admitted to Faculty of Advocates in 1974, becoming a Queen's Counsel in 1987. As a young man he was a keen sportsman, playing scrum-half for Edinburgh Wanderers and midfield for Spartans F.C. During the game between Oxford and Cambridge University football clubs at Wembley Stadium, Emslie's was the first name ever displayed on the new electronic scoreboard, in 1969 when he scored the opening goal.

== Legal career ==
He served from 1979 to 1987 as Standing Junior Counsel (legal advisor appointed by the Lord Advocate) to the Department of Health and Social Security, and from 1985 to 1988 as an Advocate Depute, representing the Crown in prosecutions and appeals in the High Court. From 1988 to 1995, he was a part-time Chairman of the Pension Appeal Tribunal, and from 1990 the Medical Appeal Tribunal. He was elected Vice-Dean of the Faculty of Advocates in 1995, holding this post until 1997, at which time his brother was elected Dean of the Faculty.

In 1997, he was appointed a Senator of the College of Justice, a judge of the Court of Session and High Court of Justiciary, Scotland's Supreme Courts, with the judicial title, Lord Kingarth. He was promoted to the Inner House of the Court of Session in 2005, at which time he was appointed to the Privy Council.

== Personal life ==
Emslie married Elizabeth Carstairs in 1974, with whom he has a son and two daughters.

== See also ==
- List of Senators of the College of Justice
