= Perth Corporation Tramways =

Tramway service in Perth, Scotland

- A 1921 photograph of the tramway staff at the Scone depot

Operation
- Locale: Perth, Scotland
- Open: 31 October 1905
- Close: 19 January 1929
- Status: Closed

Infrastructure
- Track gauge: 3 ft 6 in (1,067 mm)
- Propulsion system: Electric

Statistics
- Route length: 5.01 miles (8.06 km)

Perth Corporation Tramways operated an electric tramway service in Perth, Scotland, between 1903 and 1929. Its headquarters were at 28 High Street.

== History ==
In October 1903 the horse tramways of the Perth and District Tramways were taken over by Perth Corporation. An initial experiment with a petrol tram was unsuccessful, and electric service began on 31 October 1905.

The main route was from Scone to Cherrybank. There were branches to Craigie and to Dunkeld Road. The centre of the system was called The Cross, from which the four lines diverged. The depot was beyond the terminus at Scone.

== Fleet ==
- 1-12 Hurst Nelson 1905.
- Water car converted from former horse car number 5.

== Closure ==
In 1927 the Perth General Omnibus Company began operation of a bus service in direct competition. The Corporation responded by taking over the bus company on 3 April 1928, but the tramway closed on 19 January 1929, replaced by bus services operated by Walter Alexander & Sons.
