= James Kennedy (security guard) =

Scottish security guard posthumously awarded the George Cross

James Stirratt Topping Kennedy GC (1930 – 21 December 1973) was a Scottish security guard for British Rail Engineering Limited (BREL) in Glasgow. He was posthumously awarded the George Cross in 1975 after he was killed by armed robbers who were attempting to steal BREL's payroll. He also received the Glasgow Corporation Medal of Bravery.

Kennedy's London Gazette citation appeared in a supplement to the issue of 14 August 1975, dated 15 August 1975:

In the early hours of the morning six armed men attacked Security Guards who were moving the British Rail Engineering Works' pay-roll from the Administrative Block to various pay-out points within the complex. During the attack two security guards were slightly wounded by shots from a sawn-off shotgun. The robbers then headed towards the main exit of the Works.

Mr. Kennedy, who was the security officer on duty at the main gate, heard the shots and knowing that the criminals were armed stood in the gateway in an attempt to prevent their escape. He tackled the first man and prevented him leaving the yard. The intruder was then released by his companions who attacked Mr. Kennedy and stunned him by hitting him about the head with the barrels of their shotguns.

At this point the raiders climbed into a van which one of the gang had driven into position. Mr. Kennedy recovered consciousness and, undeterred by his injuries, made another attempt to prevent the criminals' escape by running towards the front passenger door of the van. He was killed by two shots fired from the front passenger seat. The seven criminals involved in this murder were later caught and sentenced.

It was subsequently revealed that, in addition to the fatal injuries, Mr. Kennedy had received two deeply lacerated wounds to the skull during the earlier attack. In themselves these would have been sufficient to deter most people from running further risk of injury.

Mr. Kennedy displayed exceptional gallantry and devotion to duty in circumstances of extreme danger. He showed no regard for his personal safety in the face of armed and ruthless criminals.

== Memorial ==
On 12 November 1981, at Glasgow Central station, a British Rail electric locomotive no. 86242 was named James Kennedy GC in his honour. This locomotive has been subsequently withdrawn and sold overseas.

On 21 December 2017 James Kennedy's three daughters and the Lord Provost of Glasgow unveiled a plaque in his honour at the entrance to Knorr Bremse's Springburn Works, the site of Kennedy's murder.
