= 1957 in Scottish television =

This is a list of events in Scottish television from 1957.

== Events ==
=== August ===
- 16 August – The Rosemarkie transmitting station is switched on, bringing television to Inverness and north east Scotland.
- 30 August – BBC Scotland launches a weekday five-minute news bulletin and a Saturday teatime sports round-up.
- 31 August – Central Scotland's ITV franchise Scottish Television goes on air.

=== September ===
- 18 September – Scottish launches a sports programme called Sports Desk, which was soon renamed Scotsport. By the time it ended in 2008 it was recognised as the world's longest-running sports television magazine.
- 24 September – The ITV Schools service, broadcasting programmes for schools and colleges, goes on air.

=== December ===
- 14 December – Scottish Television shows a club football match for the first time. Three days after the game was played, a ten minute film of Rangers’ European Cup tie away to AC Milan is broadcast on the Sports Desk programme.
- 25 December – The Royal Christmas Message is first televised with a message from Elizabeth II.

=== Unknown ===
- Construction of the Black Hill transmitting station in North Lanarkshire by the Independent Television Authority allows Scotland to receive the ITV service.

== Debuts ==
=== STV ===
- 18 September – Scotsport (1957–2008)

== Births ==
- 16 June - Ian Buchanan, actor
- 8 August - Ewan Stewart, actor

== See also ==
- 1957 in Scotland
