= 1984 in Scottish television =

This is a list of events in Scottish television from 1984.

== Events ==
=== April ===
- 20 April – 20th anniversary of BBC Two Scotland.

=== June ===
- 1 June – The final edition of current affairs series Agenda is broadcast on BBC1 Scotland. It had been on air for less than three years.

=== July ===
- 27 July – The final edition of Sixty Minutes is broadcast on BBC1, ending less than a year after it first went on air. Consequently, Scotland Sixty Minutes ends.
- 30 July – To fill the gap between the end of Sixty Minutes and the launch of BBC1's teatime news hour, BBC Scotland's regional news programme is broadcast for 20 minutes, beginning at 5.55pm, and the change sees the return of the Reporting Scotland name.

=== September ===
- 3 September – BBC1's teatime news hour is relaunched and now runs from 6pm until 7pm. The change results in Reporting Scotland moving to a new time of 6.35pm and the programme's length is extended to 25 minutes.

=== October ===
- 8 October – Scotland Today is relaunched as a features-led magazine format with the news relegated to brief summaries before and after the programme.

=== Unknown ===
- Unknown – Debut of the Grampian Television current affairs programme Crossfire.
- Unknown – Scottish airs Scotland's Story, a 24-part series on the history of Scotland.

== Debuts ==
=== BBC ===
- Unknown – City Lights (1984–1991)

=== ITV ===
- Unknown – Crossfire on Grampian (1984–2004)

== Returning this year ==
- 30 July – Reporting Scotland (1968–1983; 1984–present)

== Television series ==
- Scotsport (1957–2008)
- Top Club (1971–1998)
- Scotland Today (1972–2009)
- Sportscene (1975–present)
- The Beechgrove Garden (1978–present)
- Grampian Today (1980–2009)
- Take the High Road (1980–2003)
- Now You See It (1981–1986)

== Births ==
- 16 February – Kari Corbett, actor
- 18 December – Tiffany Mulheron, actress

== Deaths ==
- 4 January – Jameson Clark, 76, actor
- 6 September – Donny MacLeod, 52, television presenter

== See also ==
- 1984 in Scotland
