= 1986 in Scottish television =

This is a list of events in Scottish television from 1986.

== Events ==
=== April ===
- 4 April – Debut of the children's television series The Campbells on Scottish Television. The series – a joint Scottish-Canadian production – later aired nationally on ITV.
- 20 April – The game between Hearts and Aberdeen is the first football league match in Scotland to be televised live, broadcast by Scottish Television.

=== May ===
- 12 May – Debut of the BBC Scotland comedy Naked Video.

=== July ===
- 23 July – Television coverage of the marriage of Prince Andrew, Duke of York and Sarah Ferguson at Westminster Abbey.

=== September ===
- 1 September – 25th anniversary of Border Television.
- 3 September – BBC Scotland announce details of their £20m autumn/winter line-up of programmes.
- 30 September – 25th anniversary of Grampian Television.

=== October ===
- 20 October – Following considerable criticism, including from the Independent Broadcasting Authority, the 1984 changes made by Scottish Television to Scotland Today are reversed and the programme once again becomes a news broadcast with the feature elements transferred to a new lunchtime programme called Live at One Thirty.
- 27 October – BBC One starts a full daytime television service. Before today, excluding special events coverage, BBC One had closed down at times during weekday mornings and afternoons broadcasting trade test transmissions and, from May 1983, Pages From Ceefax. As part of the new service, changes are made to the timings of the daytime Scottish news bulletins. The lunchtime summary is broadcast prior to the lunchtime news, at 12:55 pm, and the mid-afternoon summary moves from BBC1 to BBC2. Also, the Gaelic children's slot moves to 9.45am.

== Debuts ==
=== BBC ===
- 12 May – Naked Video (1986–1991)

=== ITV ===
- 10 March – James the Cat (1986–1992)
- 4 April – (Canada) / (Scotland) The Campbells on Scottish Television (1986–1990)

== Television series ==
- Scotsport (1957–2008)
- Reporting Scotland (1968–1983; 1984–present)
- Top Club (1971–1998)
- Scotland Today (1972–2009)
- Sportscene (1975–present)
- The Beechgrove Garden (1978–present)
- Grampian Today (1980–2009)
- Take the High Road (1980–2003)
- Taggart (1983–2010)
- James the Cat (1984–1992)
- Crossfire on Grampian (1984–2004)
- City Lights (1984–1991)

== Ending this year ==
- 27 July – Now You See It (1981–1986)

== Births ==
- 8 February – Ashley Mulheron, actress and television presenter
- 18 June – Richard Madden, actor
- 18 November – Georgia King, actress

== Deaths ==
- 25 December – Bill Simpson, 55, actor

== See also ==
- 1986 in Scotland
