= John Sharp (footballer) =

Scottish footballer

Personal information
- Full name: John Harold Sharp
- Date of birth: 1885
- Place of birth: Edinburgh, Scotland
- Date of death: 1965 (aged 79–80)
- Place of death: Leith, Scotland
- Position: Forward

Senior career*
Years	Team	Apps	(Gls)
- St Bernard's
1909–1910	Hibernian	12	(5)
- * Club domestic league appearances and goals

John Harold Sharp MC (1885–1965) was a Scottish professional football forward who played in the Scottish League for Hibernian and St Bernard's.

== Personal life ==
After the outbreak of the First World War in 1914, Sharp enlisted in the Argyll and Sutherland Highlanders. By mid-1918 he was serving as a temporary lieutenant and performed a deed which saw him awarded with the Military Cross on 16 September 1918:

For conspicuous gallantry and devotion to duty throughout the week's operations, especially in rallying and organising his men during withdrawals under heavy fire. On one occasion he led a bombing party back to a trench occupied by the enemy, keeping them back until his company had reorganised in a new position. Another time he pushed forward with a Lewis gun section to meet an attack which was beaten off. Until wounded he inspired all his men by his example.

== Career statistics ==
Appearances and goals by club, season and competition
Club	Season	League			National Cup		Total	
Club	Season	Division	Apps	Goals	Apps	Goals	Apps	Goals
Hibernian	1909–10	Scottish First Division	12	5	2	0	14	5
Career total			12	5	2	0	14	5
