= 1980 in Scottish television =

This is a list of events in Scottish television from 1980.

== Events ==
=== January ===
- 7 January - Grampian Today is relaunched as North Tonight, as part of an effort to reflect northern Scotland as a whole. 1980 also sees Grampian introduces weekday lunchtime and closedown news bulletins, called North News and North Headlines respectively.

=== February ===
- 19 February - Debut of the Scottish Television's soap Take the High Road.

=== December ===
- 1 December – BBC Scotland carries out a one-week experiment in breakfast television. It is a simulcast of BBC Radio Scotland's breakfast show Good Morning Scotland.
- 28 December – The IBA announces the results of the 1980 franchise round, revealing that all three of Scotland's ITV broadcasters have retained their franchises.

=== Unknown ===
- Future British Prime Minister Gordon Brown becomes a journalist with Scottish Television.

== Debuts ==
=== ITV ===
- 7 January - Grampian Today (1980–2009)
- 19 February - Take the High Road (1980–2003)

== Television series ==
- Scotsport (1957–2008)
- Reporting Scotland (1968–1983; 1984–present)
- Top Club (1971–1998)
- Scotland Today (1972–2009)
- Sportscene (1975–Present)
- The Beechgrove Garden (1978–Present)

== Births ==
- 8 May - Michelle McManus, singer-songwriter, actress, radio and television presenter
- 2 August - Kate Heavenor, Children's television presenter
- 21 November - Lisa McAllister, model and actress
- Unknown - Bryan Swanson, television reporter

== Deaths ==
- 9 February - Renée Houston, 77, comedy actor
- 12 February - Moultrie Kelsall, 78, actor

== See also ==
- 1980 in Scotland
