= 1977 in Scottish television =

This is a list of events in Scottish television from 1977.

== Events ==
- 14 March – 25th anniversary of BBC 1 Scotland.
- June – Television coverage of the Silver Jubilee of Elizabeth II
- 25 June – Scottish Television announce that Bryan Izzard is to rejoin them as Head of Entertainment, replacing David Bell who was departing to become Controller of Entertainment at London Weekend Television.
- 31 August – 20th anniversary of Scottish Television.
- December – The BBC Scotland Sports Personality of the Year is first awarded, and has been presented annually since.
- Unknown – Cuir Car is the first children's programme to be broadcast in Gaelic.

== Television series ==
- Scotsport (1957–2008)
- Reporting Scotland (1968–1983; 1984–present)
- Top Club (1971–1998)
- Scotland Today (1972–2009)
- Sportscene (1975–Present)
- Garnock Way (1976–1979)
- Public Account (1976–1978)

== Births ==
- 29 July - Robert Florence, writer, presenter and comedian
- 30 November - Rae Hendrie, actress
- 1 December - Lee McKenzie, television presenter

== See also ==
- 1977 in Scotland
