= 1975 in Scottish television =

This is a list of events in Scottish television from 1975.

== Events ==
- 6 January – The first edition of the new Scottish politics programme Public Account is broadcast on BBC1 Scotland. It is shown late at night on Monday evenings.
- 9 August – Debut of BBC Scotland's sports strand Sportscene which replaced Sportsreel.
- 16 August – The first edition of Scoreboard is shown on BBC One Scotland. It is an opt-out from Grandstand to provide fuller coverage of the day's Scottish football news.
- Unknown – Schools programmes in Gaelic are broadcast for the first time.

== Debuts ==
=== BBC ===
- August - Sportscene on BBC 1 and BBC 2 (1975–Present)

== Television series ==
- Scotsport (1957–2008)
- Reporting Scotland (1968–1983; 1984–present)
- Top Club (1971–1998)
- Scotland Today (1972–2009)
- Sutherland's Law (1973–1976)

== Births ==
- 24 July – Laura Fraser, actress
- 7 August – Hans Matheson, actor
- 11 December – Dawn Steele, actress

== See also ==
- 1975 in Scotland
