= Perth and District Tramways Company =

Tramway in Scotland

- A tram turning into Perth's George Street, around 1900

Operation
- Locale: Perth, Scotland
- Open: 17 September 1895
- Close: 7 October 1903
- Status: Closed

Infrastructure
- Track gauge: 3 ft 6 in (1,067 mm)
- Propulsion system: Horse

Statistics
- Route length: 4.26 miles (6.86 km)

The Perth and District Tramways Company was a tramway in Perth, Scotland, from 1895 to 1903.

== History ==
The tramway built a line from Perth to Scone, having bought out the Scone and Perth Omnibus Company. Services started on 17 September 1895.

== Closure ==
The company sold out to Perth Corporation for £21,800, and from 7 October 1903, services continued as Perth Corporation Tramways.
