= Harry Weld-Forester =

Scottish cricketer (born 1981)

Harry Weld-Forester (born 5 May 1981) is a Scottish former cricketer. He was a right-handed batsman and a leg-break bowler who played for Manicaland. He was born in Glasgow.

Weld-Forester made a single first-class appearance for the side, though he neither batted or bowled for the side, and made just a single catch in the outfield.
