= Paul Rutherford (powerlifter) =

Scottish powerlifter

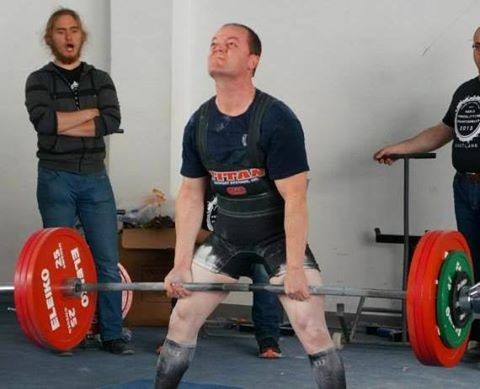
Paul Rutherford as World Powerlifting Champion

Paul Rutherford (born 14 February 1970) is a Scottish powerlifter. He is a Multiple World Powerlifting Champion.

Born in Glasgow, Scotland, he developed meningitis as an infant which severely affected his immune system and stunted his growth. As a result, he was short and very underweight as a child. Rutherford began weight training after being bullied at school. In 1985, aged 15, and at a body weight of only 79 pounds (36 kg) he took up the sport of powerlifting.

He competed as junior lifter until 1989. The 5 ft 6in personal trainer won 11 championship titles from 1986 to 1990 but then retired.

In March 2007 he promised his nine-year-old son he would make an improbable comeback after watching the film Rocky Balboa, starring Sylvester Stallone, which was all about Rocky being older but making a ring comeback. In 2007 he achieved a silver medal at the European Powerlifting championships, and then bronze at the 2009 World Championships. In 2010 he finally achieved his dream of becoming World Powerlifting Champion at the age of 41. He again won the World Championships in 2011, 2013, 2015, 2019, and 2021. His daughter Hayley Rutherford and his son Ryan Rutherford have also won their respective divisions at the WDFPF World Championships.

Paul took three years away from competition between 2015 and 2018. He returned the international competition at the World Championships in 2018 achieving a silver medal. He again won his class at the 2019 World Championships held in Halle Germany. Between 2019 and 2021 Paul tore a thigh muscle and contracted Covid-19 twice which severely hampered his ability to exercise; however, he did manage to pick up his 6th world title in Castleblayney Ireland in November 2021.

Paul has been a private trainer and lifestyle management coach for nearly 30 years. His motto is "Keep it Simple" & "let your actions not your emotions guide you."

WORLD CHAMPIONSHIP RESULTS
YEAR	COMPETITION	VENUE	POSITION	CATEGORY
2022	WDFPF World Championships	Brandon England	GOLD	67.5 kg Class
2021	WDFPF World Championships	Castleblayney Ireland	GOLD	67.5 kg Class
2019	WDFPF World Championships	Halle Germany	GOLD	67.5 kg Class
2018	WDFPF World Championships	Glasgow Scotland	SILVER	67.5 kg Class
2015	WDFPF World Championships	Sicily Italy	GOLD	67.5 kg Class
2013	WDFPF World Championships	Glasgow Scotland	GOLD	67.5 kg Class
2011	WDFPF World Championships	Glasgow Scotland	GOLD	67.5 kg Class
2010	WDFPF World Championships	Co Monagan Ireland	GOLD	67.5 kg Class
2009	WDFPF World Championships	Milton Keynes England	BRONZE	67.5 kg Class

== Career titles ==
- Scottish Champion 1986, 1987, 1988, 1989, 1990, 2008, 2010, 2011
- British Junior Champion 1989
- British Masters Champion 2010, 2011
- British Champion 2014, 2015, 2018, 2019
- European Silver medallist 2007
- World Bronze Medallist 2009
- World Unequipped Champ 2010
- World Equipped Champion 2011
- World Equipped Champion 2013
- World Equipped Champion 2015
- World Equipped Champion 2019
- World Equipped Champion 2021
- World Equipped Champion 2022
