= George Emslie, Baron Emslie =

Scottish judge (1919–2002)

The Right Honourable The Lord Emslie MBE PC QC FRSE

Member of the House of Lords
- Lord Temporal
- Life peerage 11 February 1980 – 21 November 2002

Personal details
- Born: 6 December 1919
- Died: 21 November 2002 (aged 82)

George Carlyle Emslie, Baron Emslie, MBE, PC, QC, FRSE (6 December 1919 – 21 November 2002) was a Scottish judge.

Educated at the High School of Glasgow and the University of Glasgow, he was commissioned in the Argyll and Sutherland Highlanders and served in World War II in North Africa, Italy, Greece and Austria, rising to the rank of brigade major from 1944 to 1946. He was made a Member of the Order of the British Empire (MBE) in the 1946 Birthday Honours.

He became an advocate in 1948 and served as an Advocate Depute from 1955. He became a Queen's Counsel in 1957.

He was Sheriff of Perth and Angus from 1963 to 1966 and Dean of the Faculty of Advocates from 1965 to 1970.

Emslie acted on behalf of Ian Campbell, 11th Duke of Argyll in the famous 1963 Argyll v Argyll divorce case between the Duke and Margaret Campbell, Duchess of Argyll; in the 2021 mini-series based on the case, A Very British Scandal, he was played by Oliver Chris.

He was appointed a Senator of the College of Justice in 1970 following the death of Lord Guthrie and was Lord President of the Court of Session and Lord Justice General from 1972 to 1989. He was appointed a Privy Counsellor in 1972 and Fellow of the Royal Society of Edinburgh in 1987.

He was created a life peer as Baron Emslie, of Potterton in the District of Gordon on 11 February 1980 but didn't take his seat in the House of Lords until 1990.

Two of his sons also became Senators of the College of Justice. Derek (born 1949), became a judge in 1997 with the judicial title Lord Kingarth, and his older brother Nigel (born 1947) was raised to the bench in 2001 with father's title of Lord Emslie.

Legal offices
Preceded by Lord Clyde	Lord President of the Court of Session and Lord Justice General; 1972–1989	Succeeded by Lord Hope
