= Keeper of the Great Seal of Scotland =

One of the officers of the crown in Scotland

- Neach-gleidhidh Seula Mòr na h-Alba (Scottish Gaelic)
- Royal Coat of Arms used by the Monarch in Scotland

- Flag of Scotland Royal Banner of Scotland

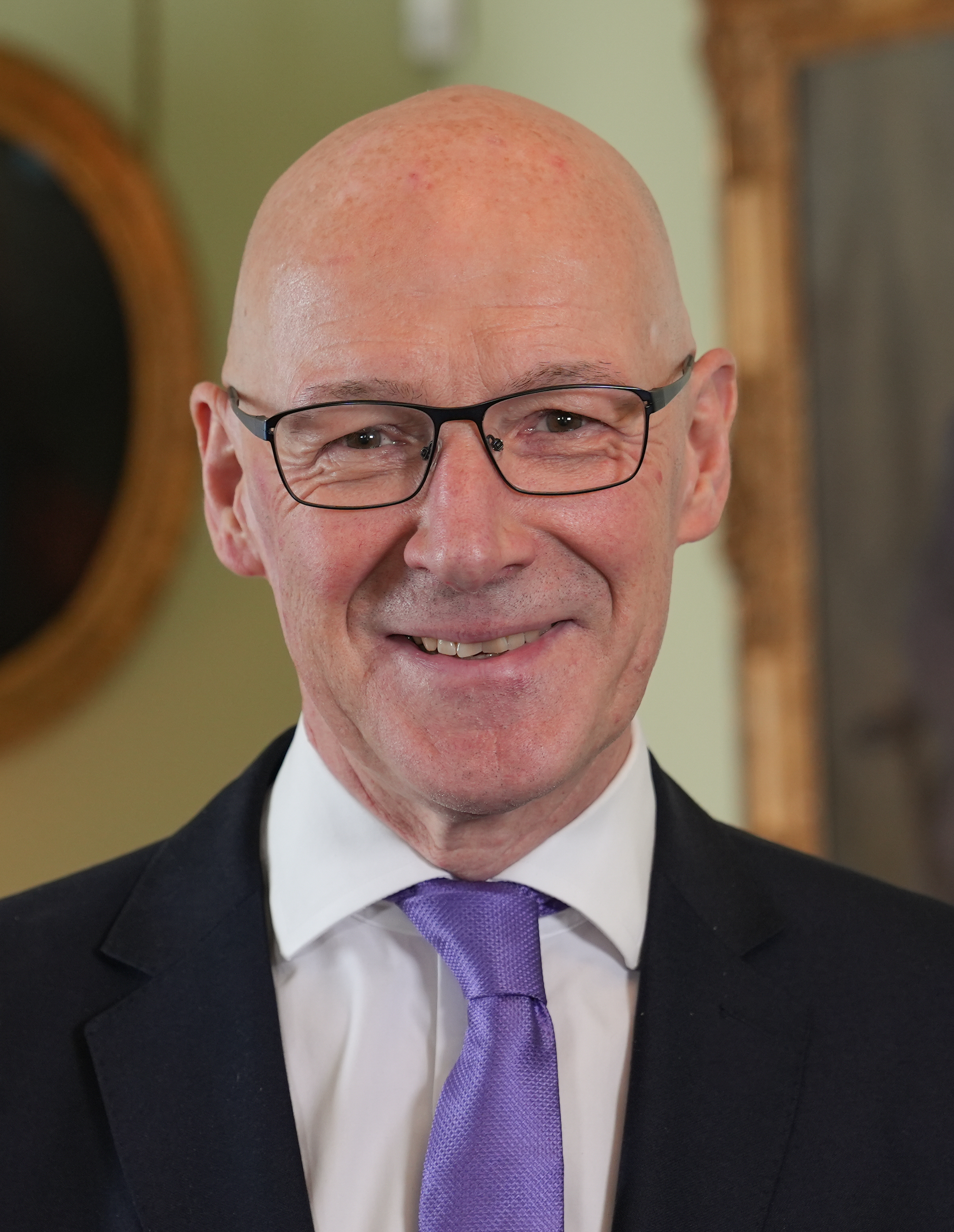
- Incumbent; John Swinney since 8 May 2024
- Scottish Government; Crown Estate Scotland; Registers of Scotland
- Status: Great Officer of State in Scotland
- Member of: Privy Council; Scottish Government; Scottish Cabinet
- Residence: Bute House
- Appointer: The Monarch
- Term length: Whilst serving as first minister
- Formation: 1389
- First holder: Sir Alexander de Cockburn (1389–1396)
- Unofficial names: Keeper of the Seal of Scotland; Keeper of the Scottish Seal
- Deputy: Keeper of the Registers of Scotland
- Website: www.ros.gov.uk/our-registers/register-of-great-seal

The keeper of the Great Seal of Scotland (Scottish Gaelic: Neach-gleidhidh Seula Mòr na h-Alba) is one of the great officers of state in Scotland held concurrently with the post of first minister of Scotland. The office holder is the keeper of the Great Seal of Scotland, the seal used by the sitting monarch to sign acts of the Scottish Parliament and permits the keeper to make decisions on behalf of the monarch. The incumbent keeper of the Great Seal of Scotland is John Swinney since 8 May 2024.

Under the terms of a royal warrant of 1818, the Keeper of the Great Seal of Scotland, the Lord Clerk Register, the Lord Advocate, and the Lord Justice Clerk are ex-officio Commissioners for the Keeping of the Regalia. Since 1996, the commissioners have also been empowered by another royal warrant for the safekeeping of the Stone of Scone and for the arrangement of its return to Westminster Abbey for the next British coronation.

Whilst Scotland was an independent sovereign country as the Kingdom of Scotland, the post was formerly known as keeper of the Seal of the Kingdom of Scotland. The Keeper of the Registers of Scotland is the Deputy Keeper of the Great Seal, and ultimately responsible for its use. The Register of the Great Seal is the oldest national record in Scotland.

== History ==
The Chancellor of Scotland had the custody of the King's Seal. The first recorded office holder was Sir Alexander de Cockburn in 1389. The Act of Union passed in 1707 to create the Kingdom of Great Britain, resulting in both the Kingdom of Scotland and Kingdom of England relinquishing their independence, abolished the Great Seal of Scotland. Following this, a different seal was created in order to be used in relation to documents that had, up until the Act of Union 1707, usually passed the Great Seal. The replacement seal is commonly referred to as the Great Seal, or the Scottish Seal, today.

The continuation of a seal was one of the guaranteed elements in the Treaty of Union. The guarantee set out in the Act of Union provided that “a Seal in Scotland after the Union be always kept and made use of in all things relating to private Rights or Grants which have usually passed the Great Seal of Scotland, and which only concern Offices, Grants, Commissions, and private Rights within that Kingdom". The Scotland Act 1998 references the current seal of Scotland as “the seal appointed by the Treaty of Union to be kept and made use of in place of the Great Seal of Scotland".

The first Keeper of the Great Seal of Scotland post Treaty of Union in 1707 was Hugh Campbell, 3rd Earl of Loudoun (1708–1713).

== Appointment and functions ==
=== First Minister ===
Until the re-establishment of the Scottish Parliament in 1999, the Keeper of the Great Seal of Scotland was usually the Secretary of State for Scotland until the responsibility passed to the First Minister of Scotland. In April 2023, First Minister Humza Yousaf, in his capacity as the Keeper of the Great Seal of Scotland, oversaw the departure of the Stone of Scone, an ancient symbol of Scotland's nationhood, for Westminster Abbey for usage in the Coronation of Charles III and Camilla on 6 May.

All incumbent First Ministers assume the role of Keeper of the Great Seal of Scotland. As Deputy Keeper of the Great Seal, the Keeper of the Registers of Scotland is required to attend the ceremonial appointment of the first minister to the position of the Keeper of the Great Seal of Scotland, and to ensure that the Seal of Scotland is present during the ceremonial appointment. Once appointed as Keeper of the Great Seal of Scotland, the office holder has the authority to make decisions on behalf of the monarch which allows the first minister as Keeper of the Great Seal of Scotland to lead the country with the support of the Scottish Parliament in the name of the incumbent Monarch.

=== Appointment ===
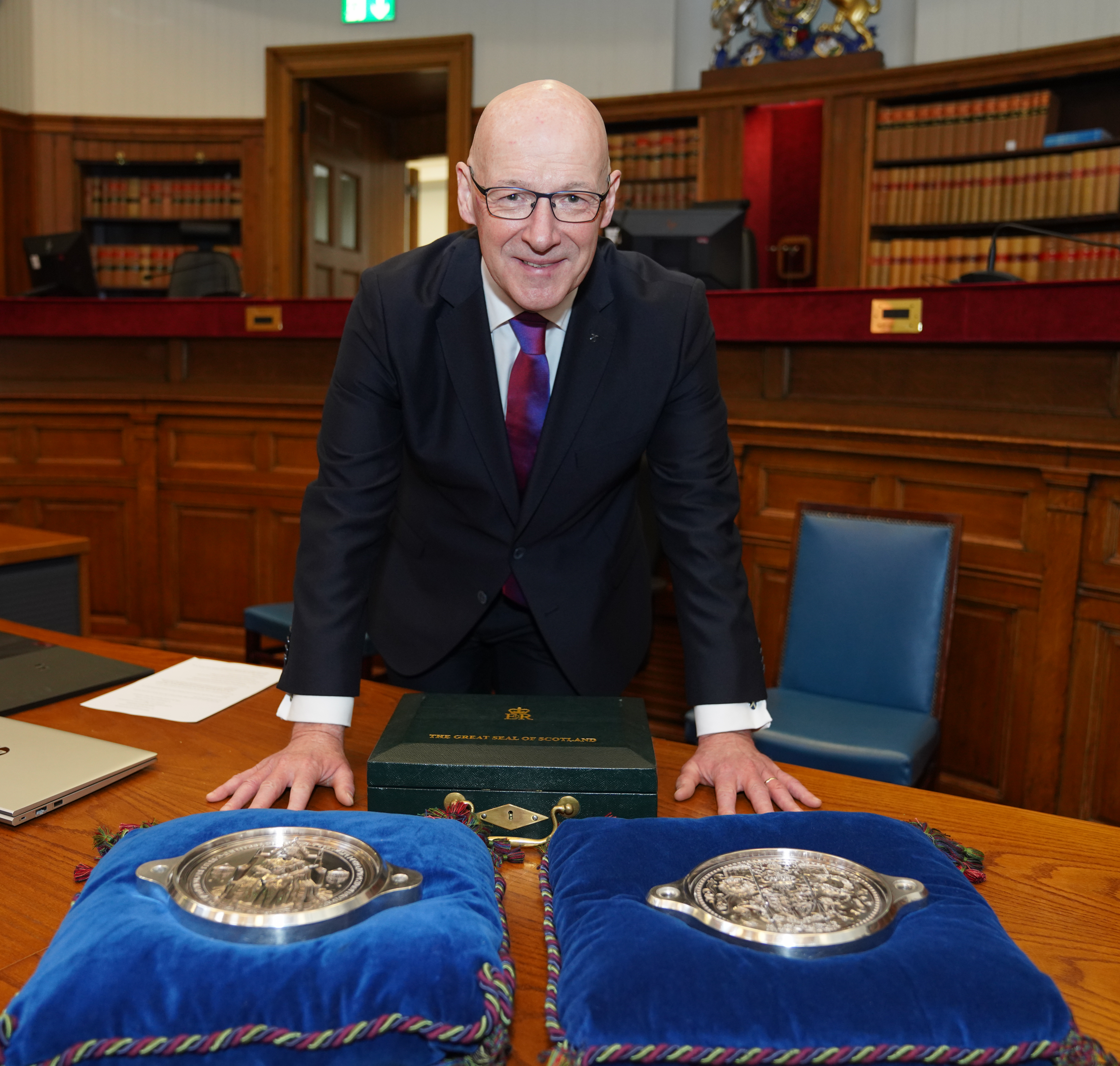
John Swinney being sworn in as First Minister and Keeper of the Great Seal at the Court of Session

The ceremonial appointing of the Keeper of the Great Seal of Scotland takes place at the Court of Session in Edinburgh, witnessed by senior judges with the Seal of Scotland being present. During the ceremonial appointment, the first minister, as the nominee to the position, signs a parchment and takes an oath of allegiance, as set out in the Promissory Oaths Act 1868, and promises to serve the monarch during their tenure as both First Minister and Keeper of the Scottish Seal.

Upon appointment as keeper of the Great Seal of Scotland, the office holder commands authority to make decisions on behalf of the reigning monarch in the name of the crown. As such, as the keeper of the Great Seal of Scotland is also the incumbent first minister of Scotland and leader of the Scottish Government, they can make decisions regarding the country with the backing of the Scottish Parliament and the monarch whilst serving as keeper of the Great Seal.

=== Storage and usage of the seal ===
When not being used for ceremonial purposes, the Great Seal of Scotland is kept at Meadowbank House in Edinburgh. The Great Seal of Scotland is applied to documents as authorised by the Monarch. The Great Seal of Scotland is used to cast a wax seal, which is applied to official documents and acts of law as part of their authentication and approval by the Monarch. The Great Seal of Scotland features the reigning monarch on one side, while the other side shows the Royal Arms as used by the Monarch in Scotland.

The Keeper of the Great Seal of Scotland has complete autonomy to make decision in Scotland on behalf of the crown, and means that the First Minister (as Keeper of the Great Seal of Scotland), has complete ability to lead the Scottish Government for as long as they have the support of the Scottish Parliament. It is applied to each document which has been authorised by the monarch and received royal assent. Notable documents which are granted the Great Seal of Scotland include Acts of the Scottish Parliament. Applying the Great Seal of Scotland to each document is part of the authentication process, and each side of the Great Seal of Scotland features the reigning monarch on one side, while the other side depicts the Royal Arms as used in Scotland.

The office of Keeper of the Great Seal of Scotland is considered one of the Great Officers of State within Scotland, along with offices of Lord Advocate, Lord Clerk Register, Lord Justice General. Within the Treason Act 1708, Section 12 makes it an act of treason in Scotland to counterfeit the seal.

=== Responsibilities of office ===
The Keeper of the Great Seal of Scotland has an overview and responsibility of the following operations and departments in Scotland:

- Crown Estate Scotland
- Ex-officio commissioner for the Keeping of the Regalia, the Honours of Scotland (The Crown of Scotland, the Sceptre and the Scottish Sword of State)
- Protection and granting of use of the Stone of Scone for coronations of the Monarch
- Protector of the Elizabeth Sword

== List of office holders ==
=== Kingdom of Scotland ===
- 1389–96: Sir Alexander de Cockburn
- Date unknown (c. 1473): Alexander de Cockburn
- 1474–1483 John Laing Bishop of Glasgow
- 1514: Gavin Douglas, Bishop of Dunkeld
- 1525: Gavin Dunbar, Bishop of Aberdeen
- Date unknown: James Beaton (1473–1539)
- Date Unknown: John Lyon, 7th Lord Glamis (c. 1521–1558)
- 1558: John Lyon, 8th Lord Glamis
- 1561: George Gordon, 4th Earl of Huntly
- 1562–1567: Sir Richard Maitland
- 1567–1635: Office holders unknown
- 1635–1638: John Spottiswoode, Archbishop of St. Andrews
- 1638–1641: James, Marquis of Hamilton
- 1641–1660: John Campbell, 1st Earl of Loudoun
- 1657–1660: Samuel Disbrowe (for the Commonwealth)
- Date unknown: Sir Adam Forrester
- Date unknown: Sir John Forrester

=== Keeper of the Great Seal ===
- 1708: Hugh Campbell, 3rd Earl of Loudoun
- 1713: James Ogilvy, 4th Earl of Findlater, 1st Earl of Seafield
- 1714: William Johnstone, 1st Marquess of Annandale
- 1716: James Graham, 1st Duke of Montrose
- 1733: Archibald Campbell, 1st Earl of Islay
- 1761: Charles Douglas, 3rd Duke of Queensberry, 2nd Duke of Dover
- 1763: James Murray, 2nd Duke of Atholl
- 1764: Hugh Hume-Campbell, 3rd Earl of Marchmont
- 1794: Alexander Gordon, 4th Duke of Gordon
- 1806: James Maitland, 8th Earl of Lauderdale
- 1807: Alexander Gordon, 4th Duke of Gordon
- 1827: George William Campbell, 6th Duke of Argyll
- 1828: George Gordon, 5th Duke of Gordon
- 1830: George William Campbell, 6th Duke of Argyll
- 1840: John Hamilton Dalrymple, 8th Earl of Stair
- 1841: John Douglas Edward Henry Campbell, 7th Duke of Argyll
- 1846: John Hamilton Dalrymple, 8th Earl of Stair
- 1852: Dunbar James Douglas, 6th Earl of Selkirk
- 1853: Cospatrick Alexander Home, 11th Earl of Home
- 1858: Dunbar James Douglas, 6th Earl of Selkirk

=== Secretary of State for Scotland ===
The following are keepers of the Great Seal who served as secretaries for Scotland (1885–1926).

- 1885: Charles Henry Gordon-Lennox, 6th Duke of Richmond
- 1886: George Otto Trevelyan
- 1886: John William Ramsay, 13th Earl of Dalhousie
- 1886: Arthur Balfour
- 1887: Schomberg Henry Kerr, 9th Marquess of Lothian
- 1892: George Otto Trevelyan
- 1895: Alexander Hugh Bruce, 6th Lord Balfour of Burleigh
- 1903: Andrew Murray, 1st Viscount Dunedin
- 1905: John Hope, 1st Marquess of Linlithgow
- 1905: John Sinclair, 1st Baron Pentland
- 1912: Thomas McKinnon Wood
- 1916: Harold Tennant
- 1916: Robert Munro, 1st Baron Alness
- 1922: Ronald Munro Ferguson, 1st Viscount Novar
- 1924: William Adamson
- 1926: Sir John Gilmour

The following are keepers of the Great Seal who served as secretaries of state for Scotland (1926–1999).

- 1926: Sir John Gilmour, 2nd Baronet
- 1929: William Adamson
- 1931: Sir Archibald Sinclair
- 1932: Sir Godfrey Collins
- 1936: Walter Elliot
- 1938: John Colville
- 1940: Ernest Brown
- 1941: Thomas Johnston
- 1945: Harry Primrose, 6th Earl of Rosebery
- 1945: Joseph Westwood
- 1947: Arthur Woodburn
- 1950: Hector McNeil
- 1951: James Stuart
- 1957: John Maclay
- 1962: Michael Noble
- 1964: William Ross
- 1970: Gordon Campbell
- 1974: William Ross
- 1976: Bruce Millan
- 1979: George Younger
- 1986: Malcolm Rifkind
- 1990: Ian Lang
- 1995: Michael Forsyth
- 1997: Donald Dewar

=== First Minister of Scotland ===
The office of the Keeper of the Great Seal was transferred on 6 May 1999, to the First Minister, in accordance with the terms of section 45(7) of the Scotland Act 1998.

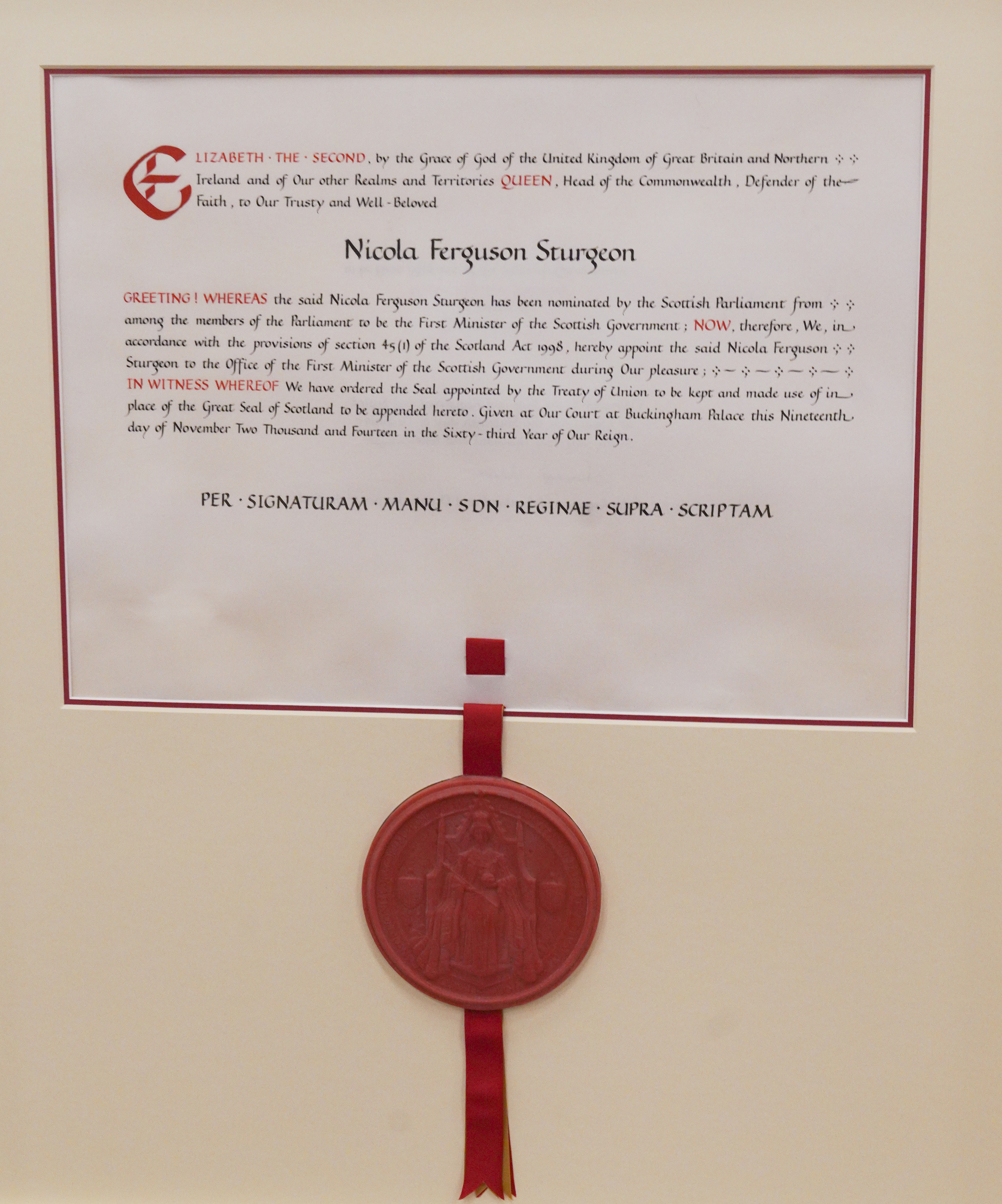
The Great Seal of Scotland during the Premiership of Nicola Sturgeon (2014–2023) under the reign of Queen Elizabeth II

- 1999: Donald Dewar
- 2000: Henry McLeish
- 2001: Jack McConnell
- 2007: Alex Salmond
- 2014: Nicola Sturgeon
- 2023: Humza Yousaf
- 2024: John Swinney

== See also ==
- First Minister of Scotland; of whom the office holder of the Keeper of the Great Seal also serves
- Great Seal of Scotland; of which the Keeper of the Great Seal is responsible for
- Great Officers of State in Scotland; of which the Keeper of the Great Seal is recognised as one of
