= 1871 =

1871 in various calendars
- Gregorian calendar: 1871; MDCCCLXXI
- French Republican calendar: 79; LXXIX
- Ab urbe condita: 2624
- Armenian calendar: 1320; ԹՎ ՌՅԻ
- Assyrian calendar: 6621
- Baháʼí calendar: 27–28
- Balinese saka calendar: 1792–1793
- Bengali calendar: 1277–1278
- Berber calendar: 2821
- British Regnal year: 34 Vict. 1 – 35 Vict. 1
- Buddhist calendar: 2415
- Burmese calendar: 1233
- Byzantine calendar: 7379–7380
- Chinese calendar: 庚午年 (Metal Horse); 4568 or 4361 — to — 辛未年 (Metal Goat); 4569 or 4362
- Coptic calendar: 1587–1588
- Discordian calendar: 3037
- Ethiopian calendar: 1863–1864
- Hebrew calendar: 5631–5632
- Hindu calendars
- Vikram Samvat: 1927–1928
- Shaka Samvat: 1792–1793
- Kali Yuga: 4971–4972
- Holocene calendar: 11871
- Igbo calendar: 871–872
- Iranian calendar: 1249–1250
- Islamic calendar: 1287–1288
- Japanese calendar: Meiji 4 (明治４年)
- Javanese calendar: 1799–1800
- Julian calendar: Gregorian minus 12 days
- Korean calendar: 4204
- Minguo calendar: 41 before ROC 民前41年
- Nanakshahi calendar: 403
- Thai solar calendar: 2413–2414
- Tibetan calendar: ལྕགས་ཕོ་རྟ་ལོ་ (male Iron-Horse); 1997 or 1616 or 844 — to — ལྕགས་མོ་ལུག་ལོ་ (female Iron-Sheep); 1998 or 1617 or 845

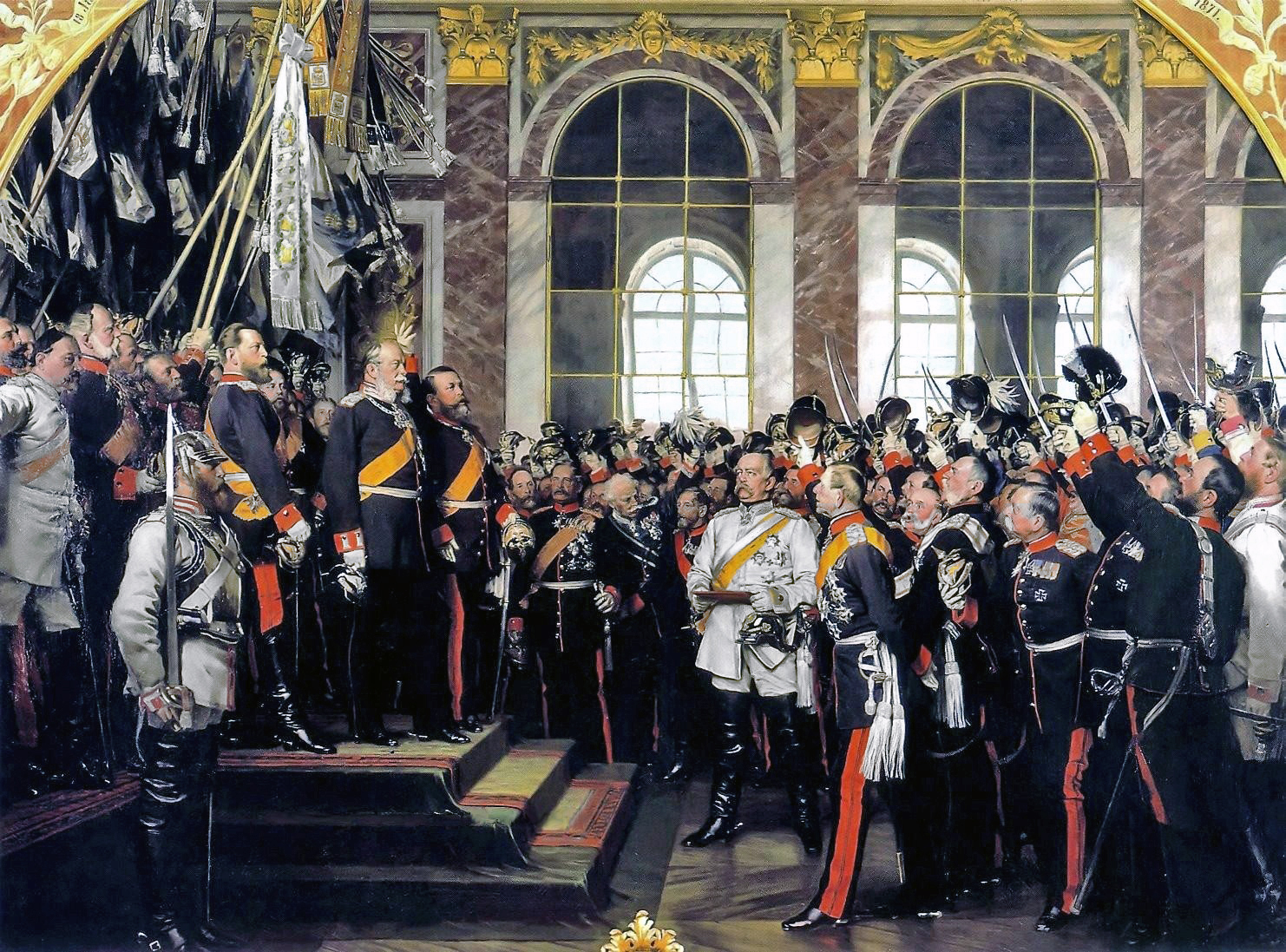
January 18: Proclamation of the German Empire

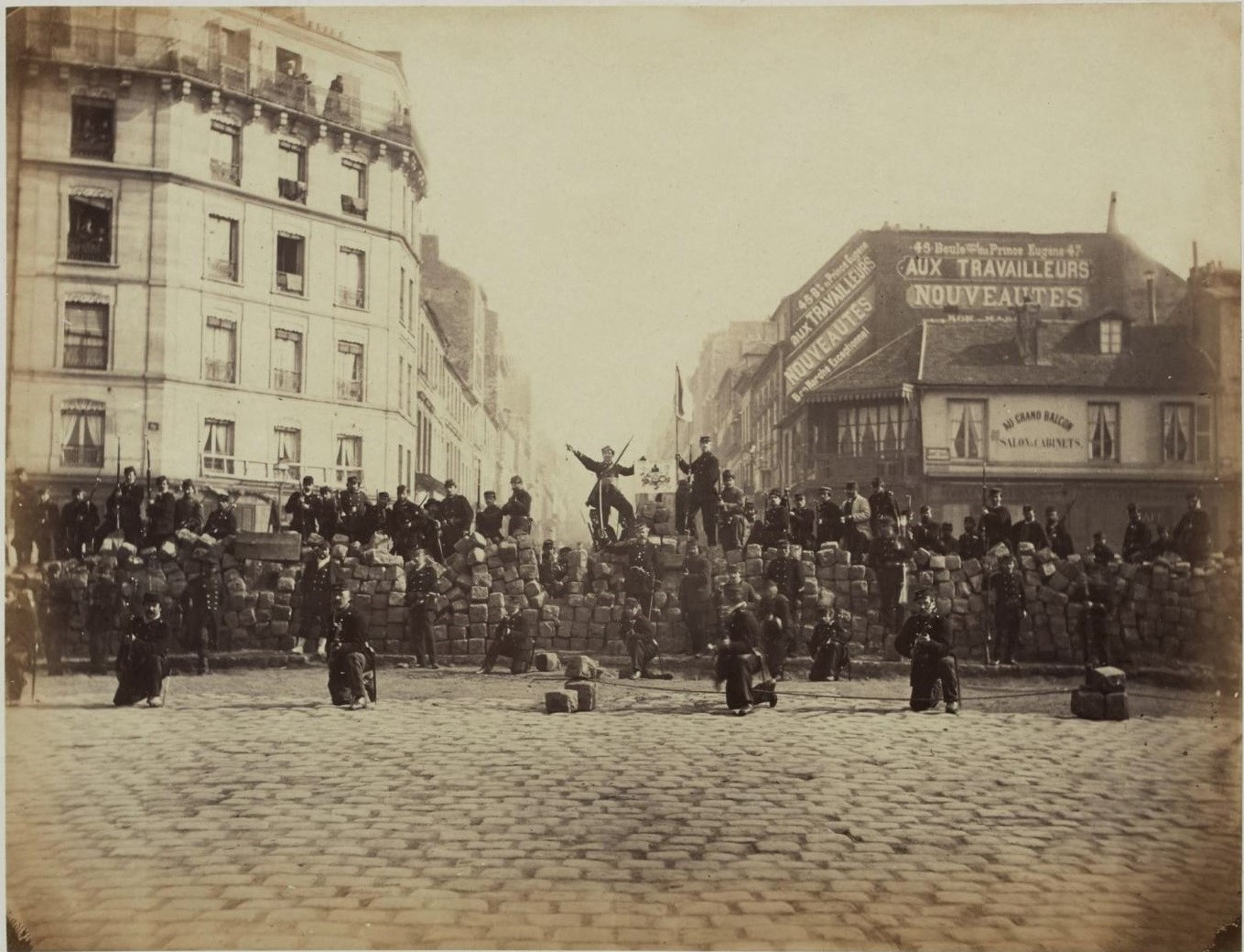
March 18: Paris Commune formed

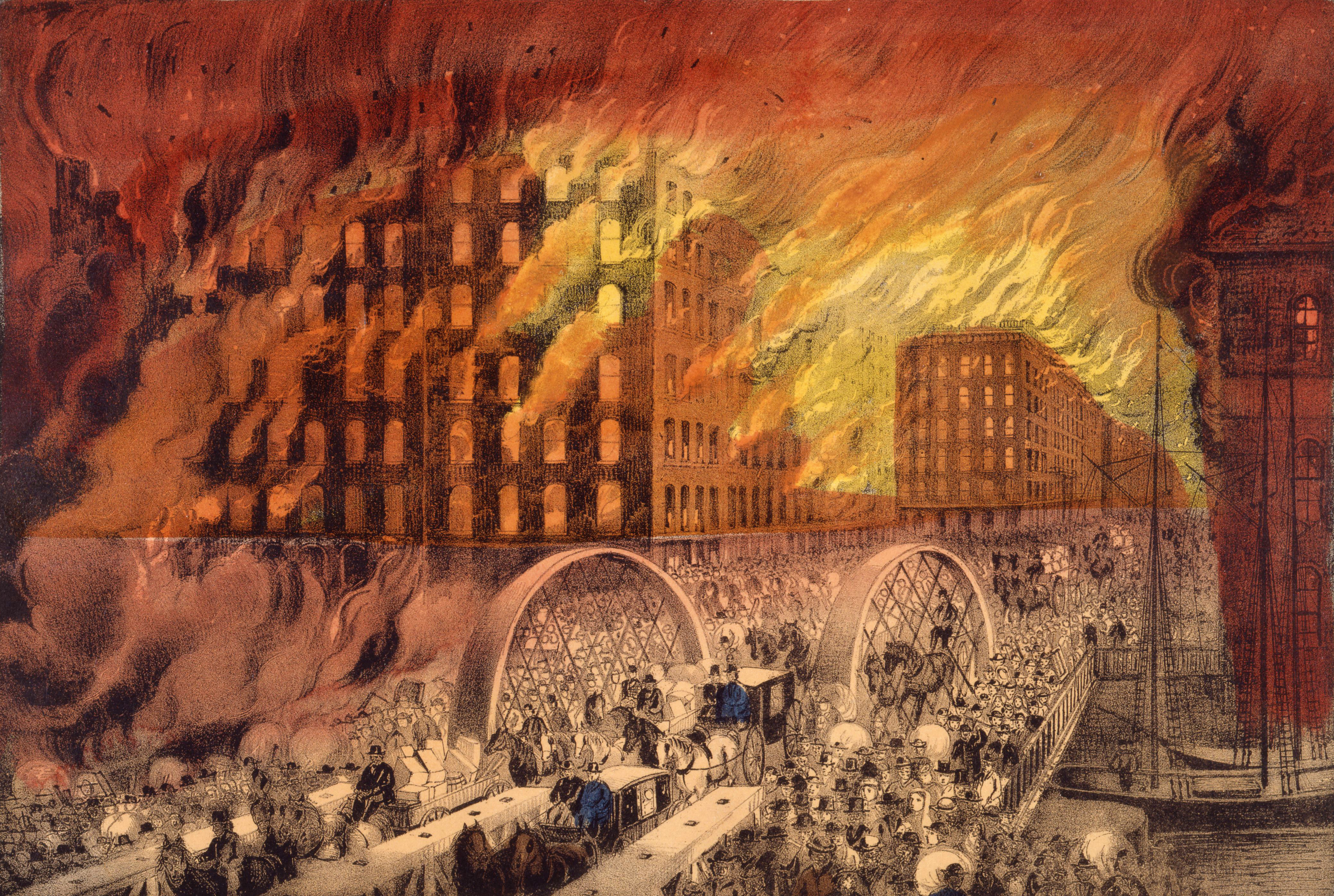
October 8 – 10: Great Chicago Fire

1871 (MDCCCLXXI) was a common year starting on Sunday of the Gregorian calendar and a common year starting on Friday of the Julian calendar, the 1871st year of the Common Era (CE) and Anno Domini (AD) designations, the 871st year of the 2nd millennium, the 71st year of the 19th century, and the 2nd year of the 1870s decade. As of the start of 1871, the Gregorian calendar was 12 days ahead of the Julian calendar, which remained in localized use until 1923.

.

== Events ==
=== January–March ===
- January 1 – The Constitution of the German Confederation comes into effect. It abolishes all restrictions on Jewish marriage, choice of occupation, place of residence, and property ownership, but exclusion from government employment and discrimination in social relations remain in effect.
- January 3 – Franco-Prussian War: Battle of Bapaume – Prussians win a strategic victory.
- January 18 – Proclamation of the German Empire: The member states of the North German Confederation and the south German states unite into a single nation state, known as the German Empire. The King of Prussia is declared the first German Emperor as Wilhelm I of Germany, in the Hall of Mirrors at the Palace of Versailles.
- January 21 – Battle of Dijon: Giuseppe Garibaldi's group of French and Italian volunteer troops, in support of the French Third Republic, win a battle against the Prussians.
- February 8 – 1871 French legislative election elects the first legislature of the French Third Republic; monarchists (Legitimists and Orleanists) favourable to peace with the German Empire gain a large majority. The National Assembly meets in Bordeaux.
- February 9 – The United States Commission on Fish and Fisheries is founded.
- February 21 – The District of Columbia Organic Act of 1871 is signed into law by U.S. President Ulysses S. Grant.
- February 24 – The Danish Women's Society is founded to promote women's rights in Denmark; on December 15 it adopts the style Dansk Kvindesamfund.
- March 3 – The first American civil service reform legislation is signed into law by U.S. President Ulysses S. Grant, creating the United States Civil Service Commission.
- March 16 – Mokrani Revolt breaks out in French Algeria against colonial rule.
- March 18 – Origin of the Paris Commune: Troops of the regular French Army, sent by Adolphe Thiers, Chef du pouvoir executive de la République française, to seize cannons stored on the hill of Montmartre, fraternise with civilians and the National Guard, and two army generals are killed. Regular troops are evacuated to Versailles.
- March 21
  - Otto von Bismarck becomes the first Chancellor of the German Empire.
  - John Campbell, Marquess of Lorne marries Princess Louise, a daughter of Queen Victoria, at Windsor; she is the first legitimate daughter of a British monarch to marry a subject since 1515.
- March 22
  - In North Carolina, William Holden becomes the first governor of a U.S. state to be removed from office by impeachment.
  - The Marseille Commune is established in southern France.
  - The United States Army issues an order for the abandonment of Fort Kearny, Nebraska.
- March 26 – The Paris Commune is formally established in France.
- March 27 – The first rugby union International results in a 1–0 win, by Scotland over England.
- March 29
  - The first Surgeon General of the United States (John Maynard Woodworth) is appointed.
  - The Royal Albert Hall in London is opened by Queen Victoria; it incorporates a grand organ by Henry Willis & Sons, the world's largest at this time.

=== April–June ===
- April – The Stockholms Handelsbank is founded.
- April 4 – The New Jersey Detective Agency is chartered, and the New Jersey State Detectives are initiated.
- April 10 – In Brooklyn, New York, P. T. Barnum opens his three-ring circus, hailing it as "The Greatest Show on Earth".
- April 11 – Funeral of Prince Alexander John of Wales at St Mary Magdalene Church, Sandringham
- April 20 – U.S. President Ulysses S. Grant signs the Civil Rights Act of 1871.
- April 24 – Murder of Jane Clouson, a servant girl, in Eltham, England; her probable murderer is acquitted.
- May 4 – The first supposedly Major League Baseball game is played in America.
- May 8 – The first Major League Baseball home run is hit by Ezra Sutton, of the Cleveland Forest Citys.
- May 10 – The Treaty of Frankfurt is signed, confirming the frontiers between Germany and France. The provinces of Alsace and Lorraine are transferred from France to Germany.
- May 11 – The first trial in the Tichborne case begins, in the London Court of Common Pleas.
- May 21
  - French government troops enter Paris to overthrow the Commune, beginning "Bloody Week" (Semaine sanglante), leading to the deaths of over 20,000 Parisians and the arrests of over 38,000 more.
  - The first rack railway in Europe, the Vitznau–Rigi Railway on Mount Rigi in Switzerland, is opened.
- May 27 – French government troops massacre 147 Communards from Belleville, at Père-Lachaise Cemetery in Paris.
- May 28 – Paris Commune falls to French government forces.
- June 1 – Bombardment of the Selee River Forts: Koreans attack two United States Navy warships.
- June 10 – United States expedition to Korea: Captain McLane Tilton leads 109 members of the United States Marine Corps in a punitive naval attack on the Han River forts on Ganghwa Island in Korea, resulting in 250 Koreans dying and diplomatic failure to "open up" Korea.
- June 17– The Parsons Sun newspaper in Parsons, Kansas is founded by Milton W. Reynolds and Leslie J. Perry, though the latter left after the first issue was published.
- June 18 – The Universities Tests Act 1871 removes restrictions which have previously limited access to Oxford, Cambridge and Durham universities to members of the Church of England.
- June 27 – The Meiji government officially adopts the yen as Japan's modern unit of currency. Coins which have been made in advance with the date 1870 are released into circulation.
- June 29 – Trade unions are legalized in the United Kingdom by the Trade Union Act 1871.

=== July–September ===
- July 13 – The first cat show is held at the Crystal Palace of London.
- July 20
  - British Columbia joins the confederation of Canada.
  - C. W. Alcock proposes that "a Challenge Cup should be established in connection with the Association", giving birth to the FA Cup for Association football in England.
- July 21 – August 26 – The first ever photographs of Yellowstone National Park region are taken by photographer William Henry Jackson, during the Hayden Geological Survey of 1871.
- July 22 – The foundation stone of the first Tay Bridge is laid; the bridge collapses as a train crosses in a storm eight years later.
- July 28 – The Annie becomes the first boat ever launched on Yellowstone Lake, in the Yellowstone National Park region.
- August 7 – Banco de Concepcion, predecessor of Itaú Unibanco, a major financial services provider in South America, is founded in Chile.
- August 9 – One of the few known major hurricanes to strike Hawaii causes significant damage on the islands of Hawaii and Maui.
- August 29 – The abolition of the han system is carried out in Japan.
- August 31 – Adolphe Thiers becomes President of the French Republic.
- September 2 – Whaling disaster of 1871: The Comet, a brig used by whalers, becomes the first of 33 ships to be crushed in the Arctic ice by an early freeze. Remarkably, all 1,219 people on the abandoned ships are rescued without a single loss of life.
- September 3 – New York City residents, tired of the corruption of the Tammany Hall political machine and "Boss" William M. Tweed, its "Grand Sachem", meet to form the 'Committee of Seventy' to reform local politics.
- September 25 – West Chester University (Pennsylvania) is charted as West Chester Normal School

=== October–December ===
- October 5 – The Società degli Spettroscopisti Italiani (laterSocietà Astronomica Italiana) is established in Rome, the first scientific organisation in the world dedicated to astrophysics.
- October 8
  - The Peshtigo fire begins and destroys the town of Peshtigo, Wisconsin, and kills as many as 2,500 people, becoming the deadliest wildfire in United States history.
  - The Great Chicago Fire breaks out in Chicago, Illinois and burns for 2 days, killing 300 people, destroying 17,500 buildings and leaving 100,000 people homeless.
  - Continental AG is founded as Continental-Caoutchouc und Gutta-Percha Compagnie in Hanover, Germany.
- October 11 – Heinrich Schliemann begins the excavation of Troy in the Ottoman Empire.
- October 12 – The Criminal Tribes Act is enacted by the British Raj in India, naming over 160 communities as "Denotified Tribes", allegedly habitually criminal (it will be repealed in 1949, after Indian independence).
- October 20 – The Royal Regiment of Artillery forms the first regular Canadian army units, when they create two batteries of garrison artillery, which later become the Royal Canadian Artillery.
- October 24 – Chinese massacre of 1871: In Los Angeles' Chinatown, 19 Chinese immigrants are killed by a mob of 500 men.
- October 26 – Liberian President Edward James Roye is deposed in a coup d'état.
- October 27
  - British forces march into the Klipdrift Republic and annex the territory as Griqualand West Colony.
  - Henri, Count of Chambord, refuses to be crowned "King Henry V of France" until France abandons its tricolor, and returns to the old Bourbon flag.
  - Boss Tweed of Tammany Hall is arrested for bribery, ending his grip on New York City.
- c. November – The South Improvement Company is formed in Pennsylvania by John D. Rockefeller and a group of major United States railroad interests, in an early effort to organize and control the American petroleum industry.
- November 5 – Wickenburg Massacre: Six men travelling by stagecoach, in the Arizona Territory, are reportedly murdered by Yavapai people.
- November 7 – The London–Australia telegraph cable is brought ashore at Darwin.
- November 10 – Henry Morton Stanley, Welsh-born correspondent for the New York Herald, locates missing Scottish explorer and missionary Dr. David Livingstone in Ujiji, near Lake Tanganyika, and greets him by saying, "Dr. Livingstone, I presume?" (according to his later account).
- November 17
  - The National Rifle Association of America is granted a charter by the state of New York.
  - George Biddell Airy presents his discovery that astronomical aberration is independent of the local medium.
- December 10 – German chancellor Otto von Bismarck tries to ban Catholics from the political stage by introducing harsh laws concerning the separation of church and state.
- December 15 – The Deseret Telegraph Company office in Pipe Spring begins service with a message keyed by Ella Stewart. It is the first telegraph sent from Arizona Territory.
- December 19 – The city of Birmingham, Alabama, is incorporated with the merger of three existing towns.
- December 24 – The opera Aida opens in Cairo, Egypt.
- December 25 – Reading F.C. is formed as an Association football club in England.
- December 26 – Thespis, the first of the Gilbert and Sullivan operas, premières in London. It does modestly well, but the two composers will not collaborate again for four years.

=== Date unknown ===
- In South Africa
  - Gold is discovered at Pilgrim's Creek in the Pilgrim's Rest area.
  - An 83.50-carat (16.700 g) diamond is discovered, resulting in a diamond rush, and the town of New Rush springs up; Colonial Commissioners arrive there on November 17.
- The Harvard Summer School is founded.
- The Shinto shrine of Izumo-taisha in Japan is designated as an Imperial shrine.
- Modern "neoclassical economics" is initiated by publication of William Stanley Jevons's Theory of Political Economy and Carl Menger's Principles of Economics (Grundsätze der Volkswirtschaftslehre).

== Births ==
=== January–February ===
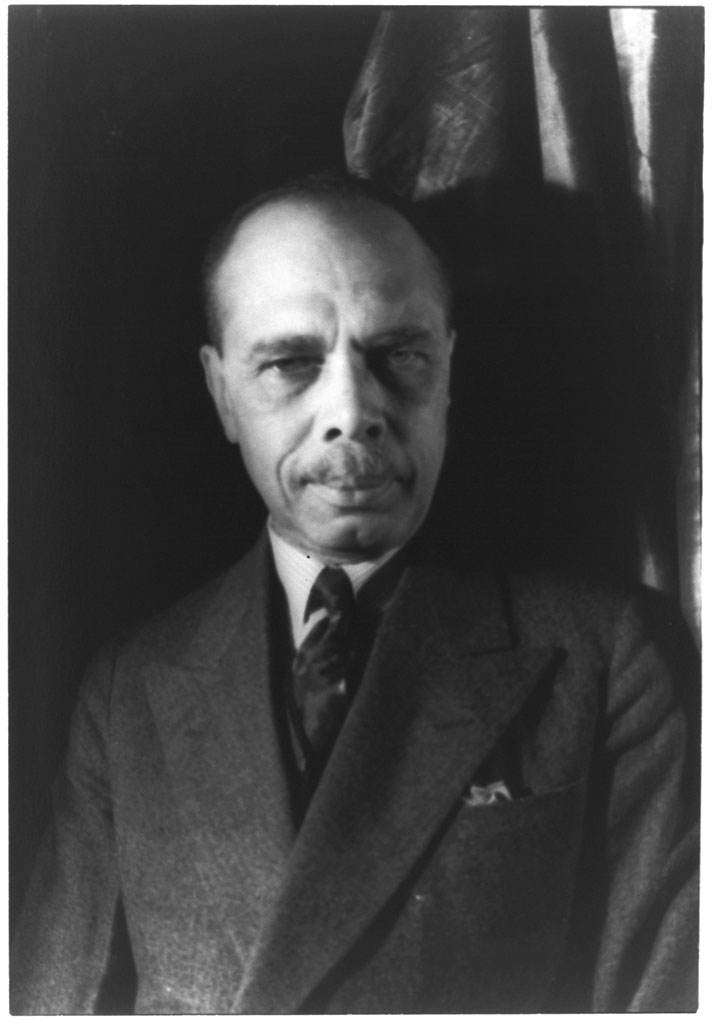
James Weldon Johnson

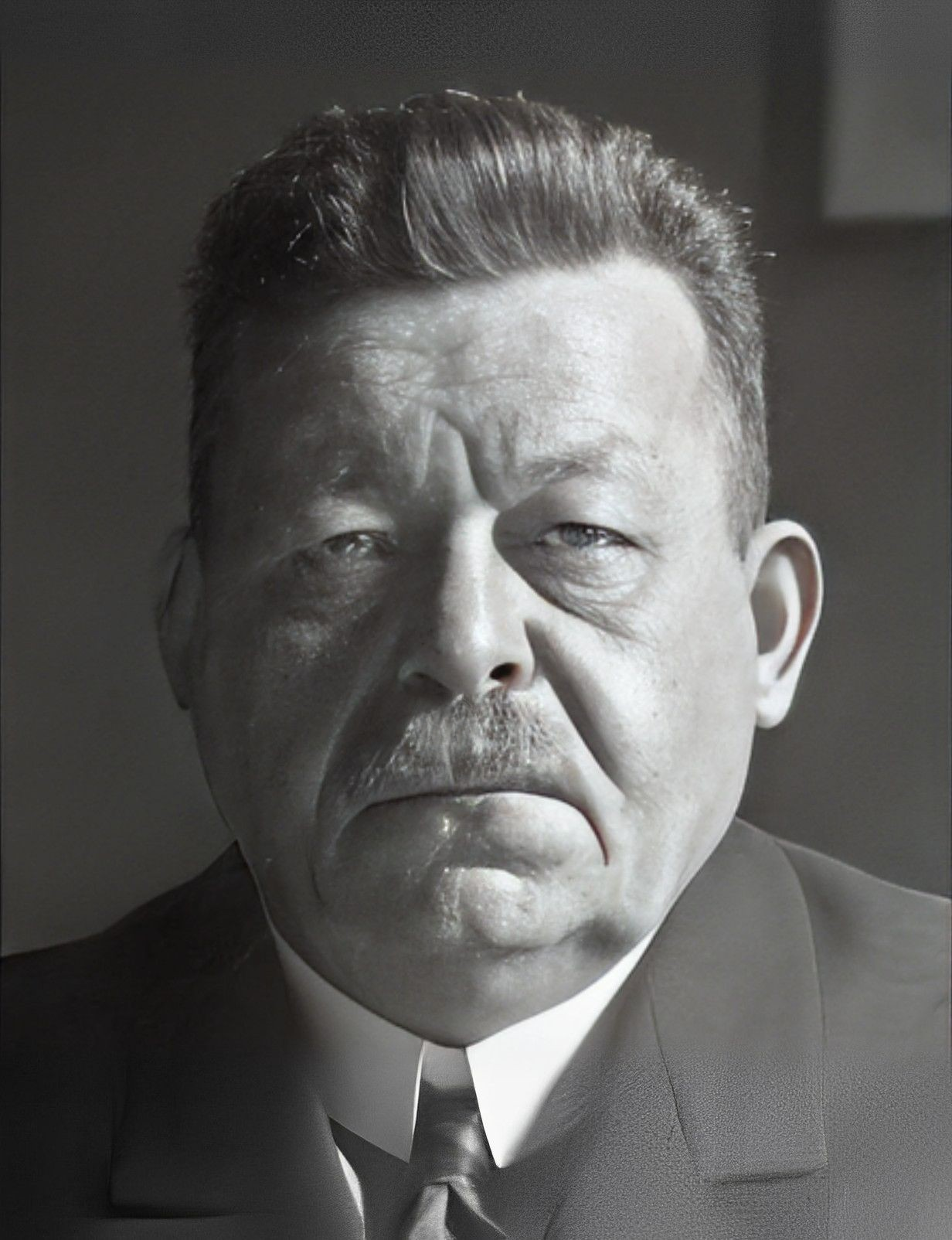
Friedrich Ebert

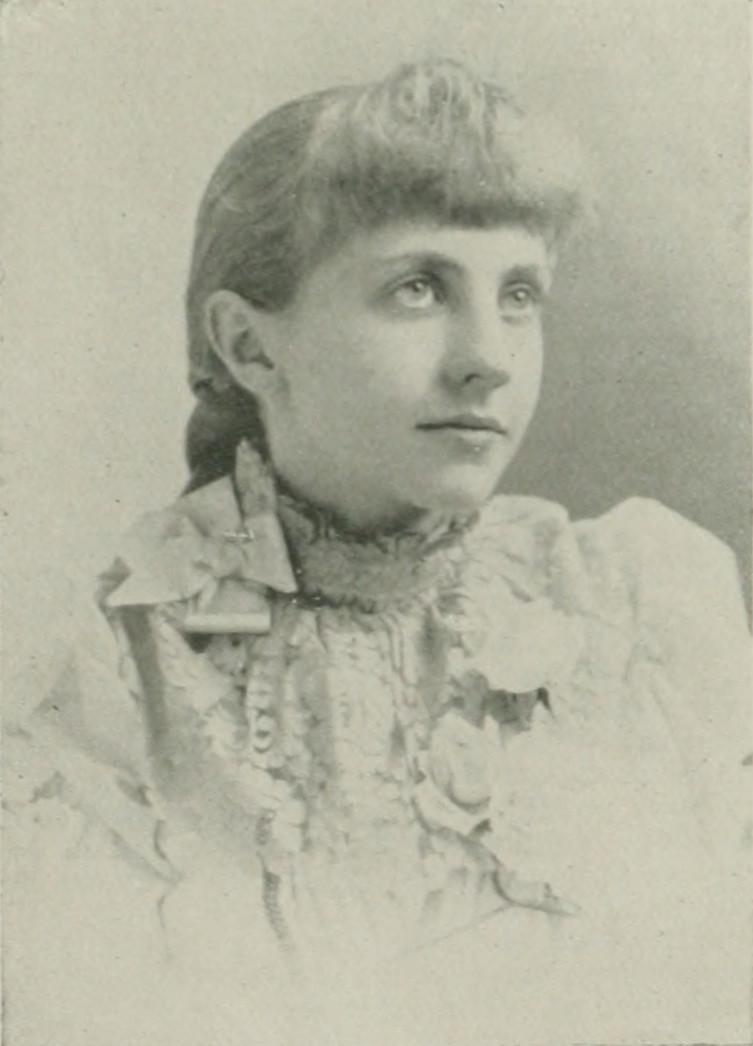
Birdie Blye

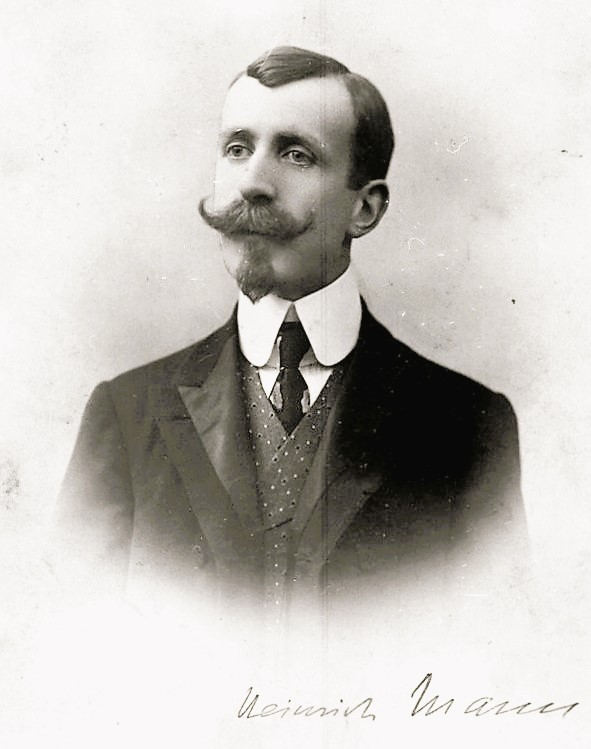
Heinrich Mann

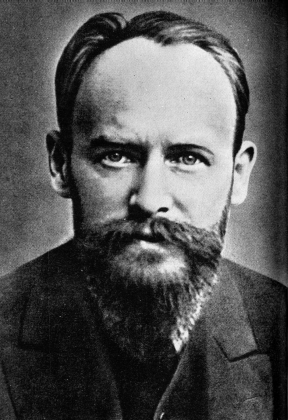
Christian Morgenstern

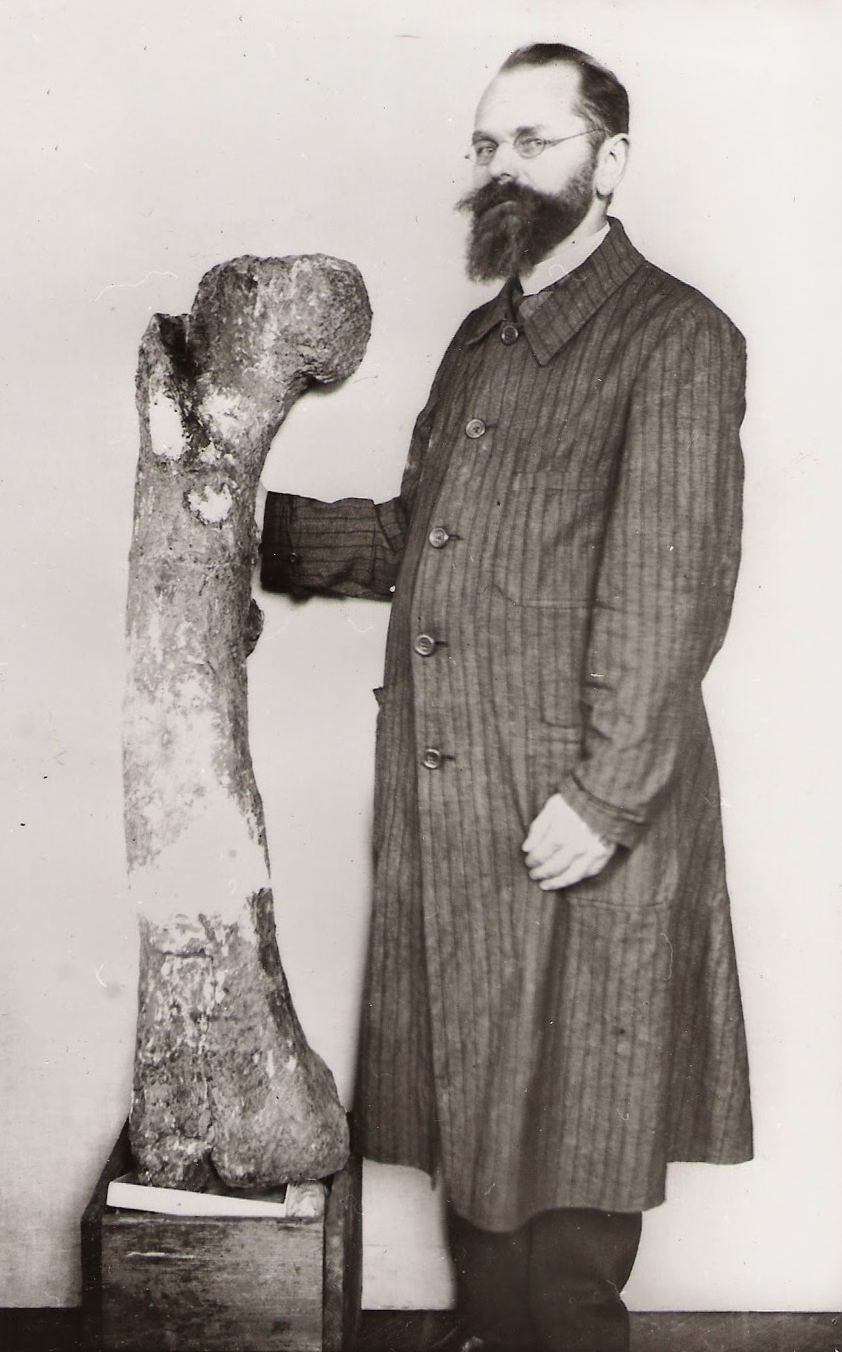
Ernst Stromer von Reichenbach

- January 1 – Manuel Gondra, Paraguayan author and journalist, 21st President of Paraguay (d. 1927)
- January 7 – Émile Borel, French mathematician, politician (d. 1956)
- January 8 – Jeanne Adnet, French anarchist (d. 1942)
- January 8 – William O. Taylor, American newspaper executive (d. 1955)
- January 17 – David Beatty, 1st Earl Beatty, British admiral (d. 1936)
- January 19 – Frederick Maurice, British Army officer, military correspondent, writer and academic (d. 1951)
- January 20
  - Élisée Bastard, French anarchist (d. 1957)
  - Fabián García, Mexican-American horticulturist (d. 1948)
- January 30 – Wilfred Lucas, Canadian-born actor (d. 1940)
- February 4
  - Friedrich Ebert, President of Germany (d. 1925)
  - Heinrich Schnee, German lawyer, colonial civil servant, politician, writer, and association official (d. 1949)
- February 6 – C. V. Kunhiraman, Indian social reformer, journalist and the founder of Kerala Kaumudi daily (d. 1949)
- February 9 – Howard Taylor Ricketts, American pathologist (d. 1910)
- February 14 – Florence Roberts, American stage actress (d. 1927)
- February 18 – Harry Brearley, English inventor (d. 1948)
- February 25 – Lesya Ukrainka, born Larysa Petrivna Kosach, Ukrainian writer; political, civil and feminist activist (d. 1913)
- February 26 – Matti Turkia, Finnish politician (d. 1946)
- February 27 – Otto Praeger, American postal official, implemented U.S. Airmail (d. 1948)
- February 28
  - Manuel Díaz Rodríguez, Venezuelan writer and politician (d. 1927)
  - Arthur Charles Fox-Davies, British expert on heraldry (d. 1928)

=== March–April ===
- March 1
  - Ben Harney, American composer and pianist (d. 1938)
  - Hermann Kallenbach, Lithuanian-born Jewish South African architect (d. 1945)
  - Oskar Heinroth, German biologist and zoologist (d. 1945)
- March 4 – Boris Galerkin, Russian mathematician (d. 1945)
- March 5 – Rosa Luxemburg, German politician (d. 1919)
- March 6 – Afonso Costa, Portuguese lawyer, professor, politician and 3-time Prime Minister of Portugal (d. 1937)
- May 10 – Edward FitzGerald, American-born mountaineer and soldier of British descent (d. 1931)
- March 12 – Kitty Marion, German-born actress and women's rights activist in England and the United States (d. 1944)
- March 15
  - Constantin Argetoianu, 41st Prime Minister of Romania (d. 1955)
  - James B. A. Robertson, American lawyer, judge and the fourth governor of Oklahoma (d. 1938)
- March 17 – Konstantinos Pallis, Greek general (d. 1941)
- March 19
  - Schofield Haigh, English cricketer (d. 1921)
  - John Henry Taylor, English professional golfer (d. 1963)
  - Baroness Mary Vetsera (d. 1889)
- March 24 – Birdie Blye, American pianist (d. 1935)
- March 26 – Jonah Kūhiō Kalanianaʻole, Hawaiian royalty and politician (d. 1922)
- March 27 – Heinrich Mann, German writer (d. 1950)
- March 28 – Herman van Roijen, Dutch diplomat (d. 1933)
- March 29 – Aleksei Chichibabin, Soviet Russian organic chemist (d. 1945)
- March 31 – Arthur Griffith, President of Ireland (d. 1922)
- April 1 – F. Melius Christiansen, Norwegian-born violinist and choral conductor (d. 1955)
- April 3 – John Wren, Australian business man (d. 1953)
- April 4 – Luke McNamee, American admiral (d. 1952)
- April 6
  - Prince Alexander John of Wales, British Prince (d. April 7)
  - Giorgi Mazniashvili, Georgian general and prominent military figures in the Democratic Republic of Georgia (d. 1937)
- April 7 – Charlotte Maxeke, South African religious leader, social and political activist (d. 1939)
- April 8 – Clarence Hudson White, American photographer (d. 1925)
- April 12 – Ioannis Metaxas, Prime Minister of Greece (d. 1941)
- April 13 – Jurgis Matulaitis-Matulevičius, Lithuanian author, Roman Catholic archbishop and blessed (d. 1927)
- April 15 – Jonathan Zenneck, German physicist, electrical engineer (d. 1959)

=== May–June ===
- May 2 – Francis P. Duffy, Canadian-born American Catholic priest (d. 1932)
- May 3 – Emmett Dalton, American outlaw, train robber and member of the Dalton Gang (d. 1937)
- May 6
  - Victor Grignard, French chemist, Nobel Prize in Chemistry laureate (d. 1935)
  - Christian Morgenstern, German author (d. 1914)
- May 7 – Gyula Károlyi, 29th Prime Minister of Hungary (d. 1947)
- May 9 – Grand Duke George Alexandrovich of Russia, third son of Alexander III, Maria of Russia and brother of Nicholas II (d. 1899)
- May 14 – Walter Stanley Monroe, businessman, politician, and former Prime Minister of Newfoundland (d. 1952)
- May 19 – Walter Russell, American artist (d. 1963)
- May 26 – Camille Huysmans, Belgian politician and former prime minister of Belgium (d. 1968)
- May 27 – Georges Rouault, French painter, graphic artist (d. 1958)
- May 28 – Teriimaevarua III, last Queen of Bora Bora (d. 1932)
- June 5
  - Nicolae Iorga, 34th Prime Minister of Romania (d. 1940)
  - Michele Angiolillo, Italian anarchist (d. 1897)
- June 7 – Khwaja Salimullah, fourth Nawab of Dhaka and one of the leading Muslim politicians during the British rule in India (d. 1915)
- June 8 – Howard Gould, American financier and the son of Jay Gould (d. 1959)
- June 11 – Walter Cowan, British admiral (d. 1956)
- June 12
  - Ernst Stromer, German paleontologist (d. 1952)
  - Lu Zhengxiang, Chinese diplomat and a Roman Catholic priest and monk (d. 1949)
- June 13 – Princess Hélène of Orléans, member of the deposed Orléans royal family of France (d. 1951)
- June 14 – Jacob Ellehammer, Danish inventor (d. 1946)
- June 17 – James Weldon Johnson, American author, politician, diplomat, critic, journalist, poet, anthologist, educator, lawyer, songwriter and early civil rights activist (d. 1938)
- June 18 – Edmund Breese, American actor (d. 1936)
- June 23 – Jantina Tammes, Dutch plant biologist (d. 1947)
- June 26 – Reginald R. Belknap, United States Navy rear admiral (d. 1959)

=== July–August ===
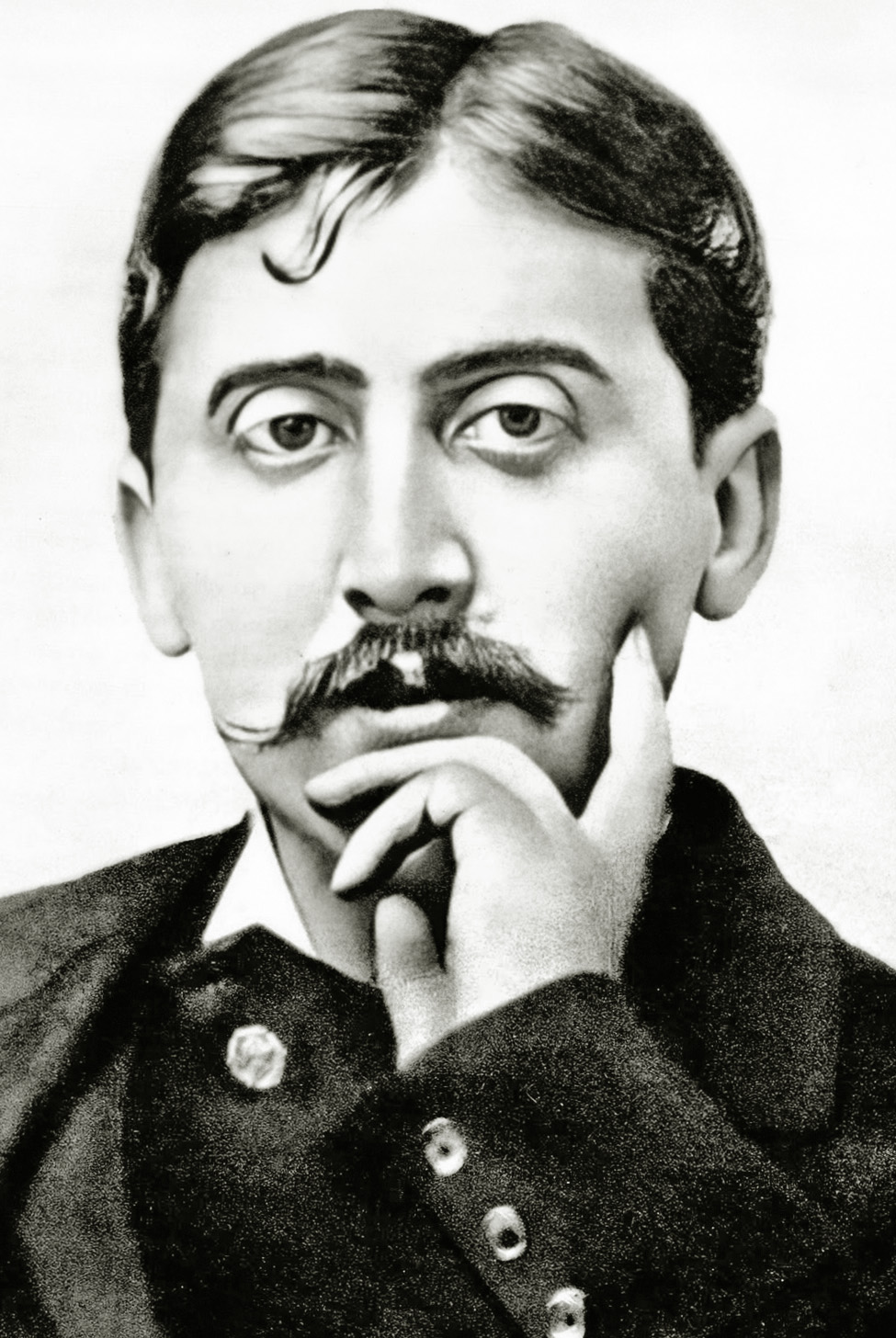
Marcel Proust

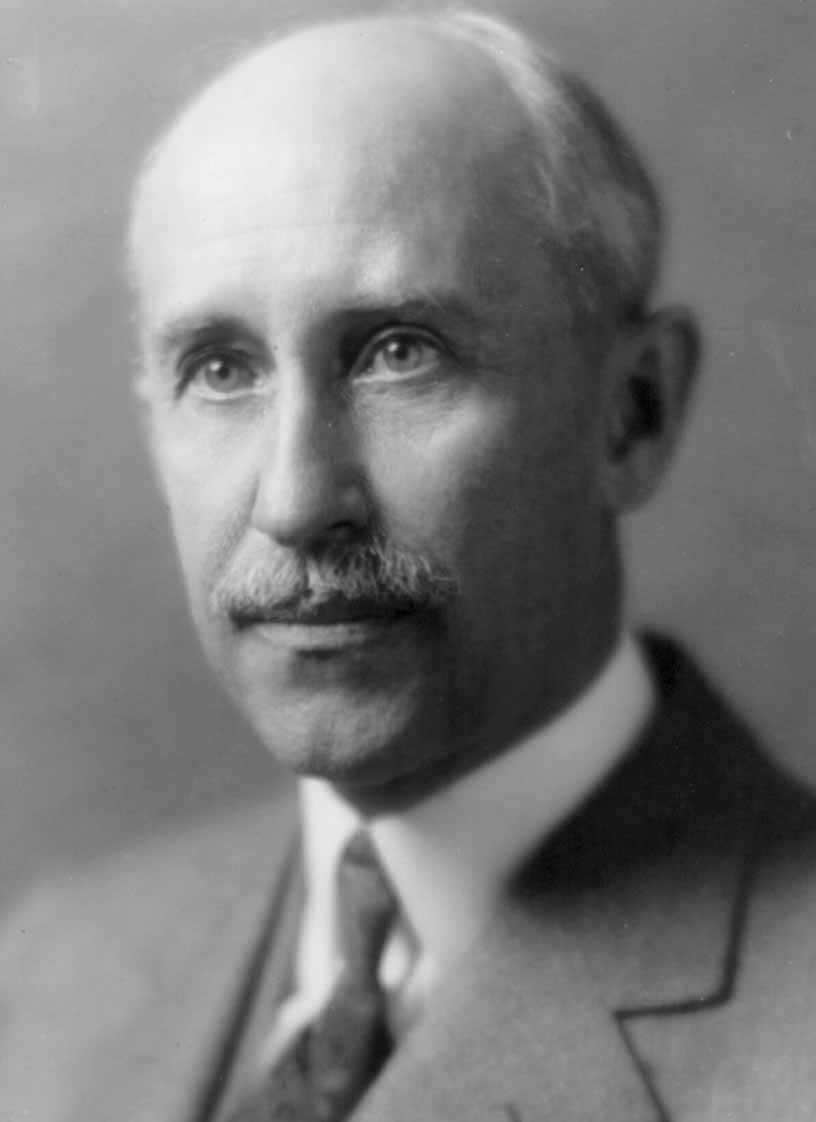
Orville Wright

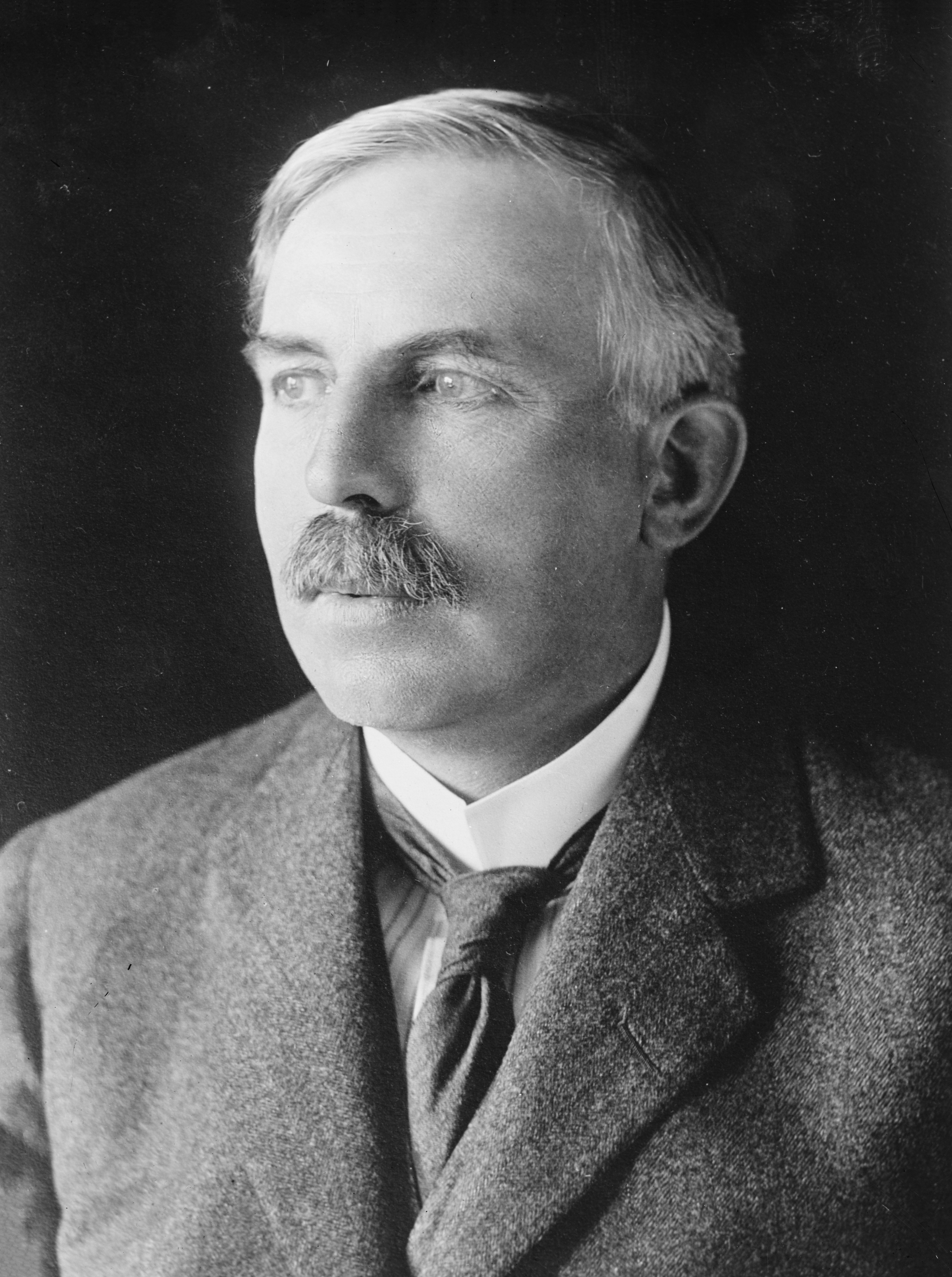
Ernest Rutherford

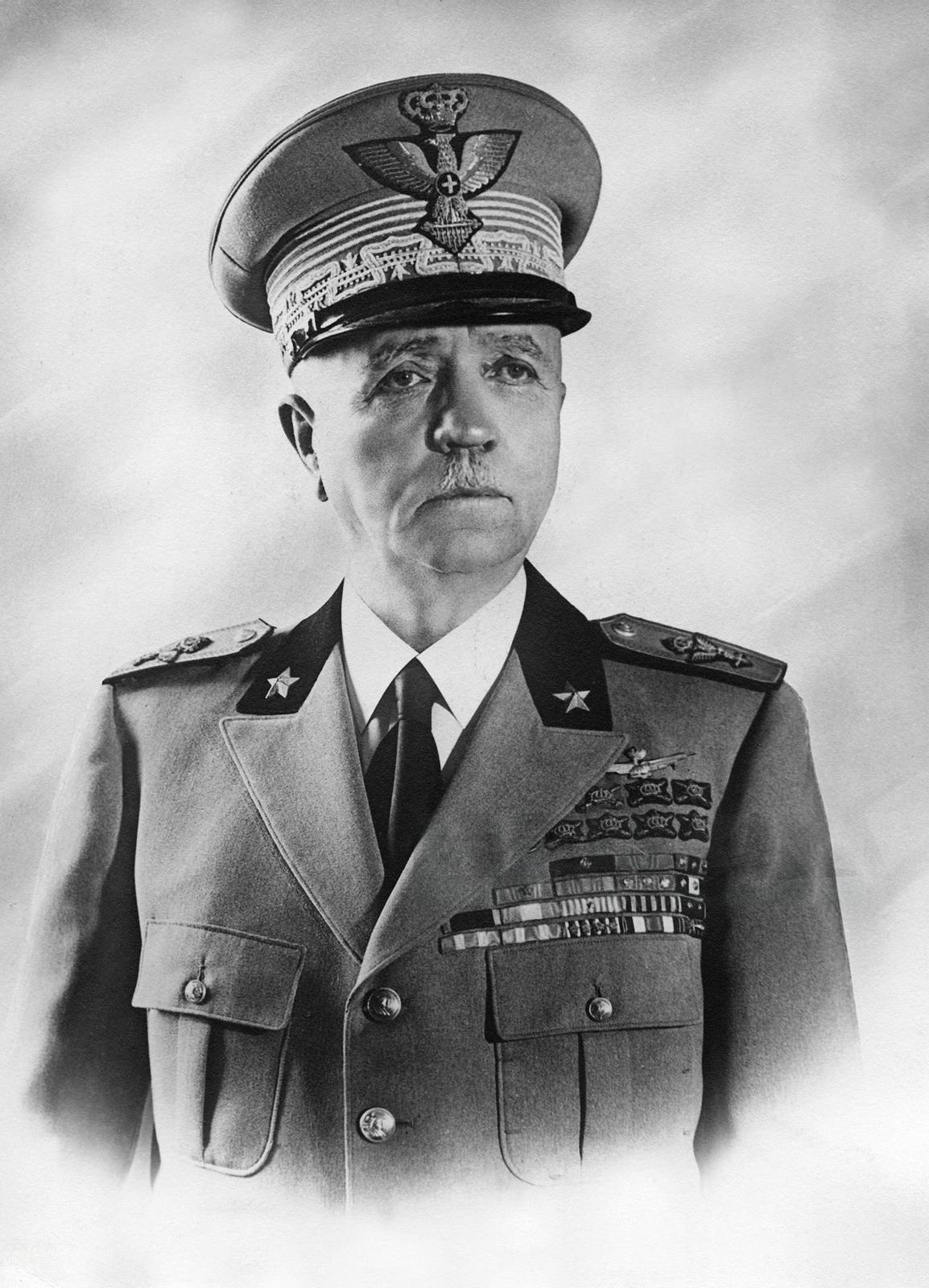
Pietro Badoglio

- July 2 – Wilhelm von Mirbach, German diplomat (d. 1918)
- July 5 – Claus Schilling, German medical researcher and war criminal (d. 1946)
- July 10 – Marcel Proust, French writer (d. 1922)
- July 13 – John Norton-Griffiths, British engineer, army officer, and politician (d. 1930)
- July 17 – Lyonel Feininger, German painter (d. 1956)
- July 18 – Sada Yacco, Japanese stage actress (d. 1946)
- July 22 – Aarnoud van Heemstra, Dutch nobleman, jurist and politician (d. 1951)
- July 25 – Richard Turner, Canadian soldier (d. 1961)
- August 1 – John Lester, American cricketer (d. 1969)
- August 3 – Augusta Holtz, Polish-American supercentenarian, last surviving person born in 1871 (d. 1986)
- August 4 – Lillian Smith, American trick shooter and trick rider (d. 1930)
- August 12
  - Gustavs Zemgals, 2nd President of Latvia (d. 1939)
  - Carlos Manuel de Céspedes y Quesada, Cuban writer, politician, diplomat, and sixth President of Cuba (d. 1939)
- August 13 – Karl Liebknecht, German politician (d. 1919)
- August 14 – Guangxu Emperor of China (d. 1908)
- August 19
  - Orville Wright, American aviation pioneer, co-inventor of the airplane with brother Wilbur (d. 1948)
  - Joseph E. Widener, American art collector (d. 1943)
- August 23 – Sofia Panina, Russian politician (d. 1956)
- August 25 – Nils Edén, 15th Prime Minister of Sweden (d. 1945)
- August 26 – Edward Lavin Girroir, Canadian politician (d. 1932)
- August 27 – Theodore Dreiser, American writer (d. 1945)
- August 29 – Albert François Lebrun, French politician (d. 1950)
- August 30 – Ernest Rutherford, New Zealand physicist, recipient of the Nobel Prize in Chemistry (d. 1937)
- August 31
  - Ernst II, last reigning duke of Saxe-Altenburg and German general in World War I (d. 1955)
  - Syed Hasan Imam, Indian politician and served as President of the Indian National Congress (d. 1933)

=== September–October ===
- September 1 – J. Reuben Clark, Under Secretary of State for U.S. President Calvin Coolidge (d. 1961)
- September 7 – Francis Aylmer Maxwell, British-Indian Army officer in the Second Boer War and WWI (d. 1917)
- September 10
  - Thomas Adams, British urban planner (d. 1940)
  - Charles Collett, English Great Western Railway chief mechanical engineer (d. 1952)
- September 11 – Scipione Borghese, Italian aristocrat, industrialist, politician, explorer, mountain climber and race driver (d. 1927)
- September 13 – Alma Kruger, American actress (d. 1960)
- September 15 – Aloysius, Prince of Löwenstein-Wertheim-Rosenberg
- September 17 – Eivind Astrup, Norwegian Arctic explorer (d. 1895)
- September 19
  - Frederick Ruple, Swiss-born American portrait painter (d. 1938)
  - Gösta Lilliehöök, Swedish Army officer (d. 1952)
  - Magnus Johnson, American politician (d. 1936)
- September 22 – Gaskell Romney, American patriarch of the Romney family (d. 1955)
- September 23 – František Kupka, Czech painter and graphic artist (d. 1957)
- September 24 – Lottie Dod, English athlete (d. 1960)
- September 26 – Winsor McCay, American cartoonist, animator (d. 1934)
- September 27 – Grazia Deledda, Italian writer, Nobel Prize laureate (d. 1936)
- September 28 – Pietro Badoglio, Italian field marshal, prime minister (d. 1956)
- September 30 – Adolphe Stoclet, Belgian engineer, financier and noted collector (d. 1949)
- October 2 – Cordell Hull, United States Secretary of State, recipient of the Nobel Peace Prize (d. 1955)
- October 3 – Kim Bo-hyon, paternal grandfather of Kim Il Sung, great-grandfather of Kim Jong Il, and great-great-grandfather of Kim Jong Un (d. 1955)
- October 5 – Sulejman Delvina, Albanian politician (d. 1932)
- October 10 – David Lindsay, British Conservative politician and art connoisseur (d. 1940)
- October 11 – Sidney Dillon Redmond, American civic leader, physician, lawyer, and politician (d. 1948)
- October 14 – Alexander von Zemlinsky, Austrian composer, conductor, and teacher (d. 1942)
- October 19 – Walter Bradford Cannon, American physiologist (d. 1945)
- October 11 – Harriet Boyd Hawes, American archaeologist (d. 1945)
- October 17 – Dénes Berinkey, 21st Prime Minister of Hungary (d. 1944)
- October 20 – Atul Prasad Sen, Bengali composer, lyricist, singer, lawyer, philanthropist, social worker, educationist and writer (d. 1934)
- October 25 – John Gough, British general, Victoria Cross recipient (d. 1915)
- October 27 – Vatslav Vorovsky, Russian Bolshevik, Marxist revolutionary, literary critic, publicist and Soviet diplomat (d. 1923)
- October 30
  - Buck Freeman, American baseball player (d. 1949)
  - Paul Valéry, French poet (d. 1945)

=== November–December ===
- November 1 – Stephen Crane, American writer (d. 1900)
- November 12 – Dagmar Hansen, Danish cabaret-singer, stage-performer and Denmark's first "pin-up girl" (d. 1959)
- November 13 – Vladislav F. Ribnikar, Serbian journalist (d. 1914)
- November 14 – Wajed Ali Khan Panni, Bengali aristocrat and philanthropist (d. 1936)
- November 10
  - Winston Churchill, American best-selling novelist (d. 1947)
  - Sachchidananda Sinha, Indian lawyer, parliamentarian, and journalist (d. 1950)
- November 18 – Amadeu Vives i Roig, Spanish-Catalan composer and writer (d. 1932)
- November 23 – William Watt, Australian politician, Premier of Victoria (d. 1946)
- November 26 – Luigi Sturzo, Italian Catholic priest and politician (d. 1959)
- November 27 – Giovanni Giorgi, Italian physicist and electrical engineer (d. 1950)
- December 9 – Joe Kelley, American Baseball Hall of Famer (d. 1943)
- December 13 – Emily Carr, Canadian artist (d. 1945)
- December 14 – August von Hayek, Austrian physician and botanist (d. 1928)
- December 16 – Manuel Fernández Silvestre, Spanish general (d. 1921)
- December 17 – Virginia Fábregas, Mexican actress (d. 1950)
- December 29 – Meyer London, American politician (d. 1926)

=== Date unknown ===
- Mulai Ahmed er Raisuni, Moroccan sharif and tribal leader (d. 1925)
- Sevasti Qiriazi, Albanian educator, women's rights activist (d. 1949)
- Zhang Jinghui, Chinese general and politician, second and final Prime Minister of Manchukuo (d. 1959)
- Armando Falconi, Italian stage and film actor (d. 1954)
- Cyrus Avery, creator of US Route 66 (d. 1963)
- Hasan Rıza Pasha, general in the Ottoman Army (d. 1913)
- Isfandiyar Khan, Khan of Khiva between September 1910 and October 1, 1918 (d. 1918)
- R. Ramachandra Rao, Indian civil servant, mathematician and social and political activist (d. 1936)
- Konstantinos Spanoudis, Greek politician and journalist (d. 1941)

== Deaths ==
=== January–June ===
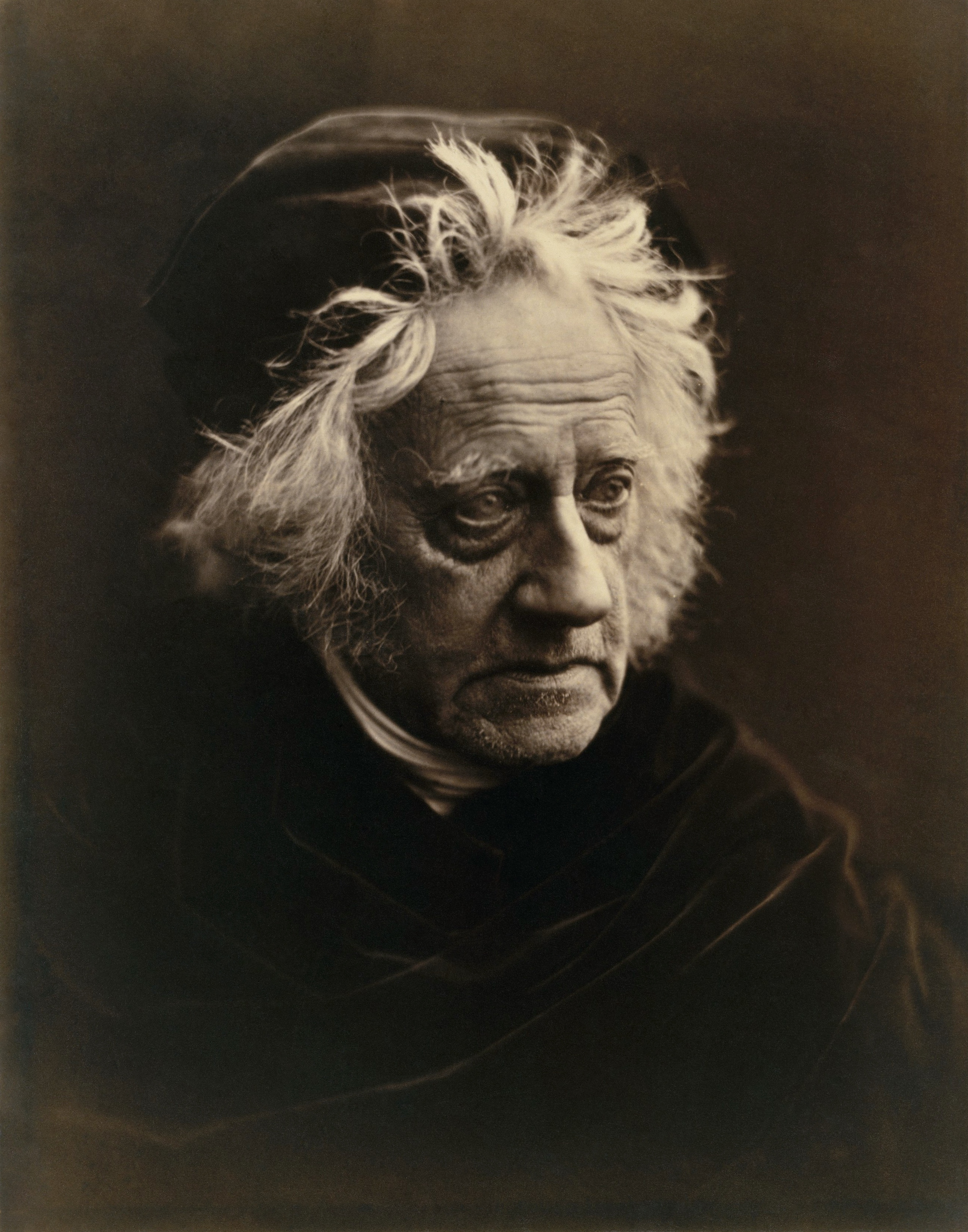
John Herschel

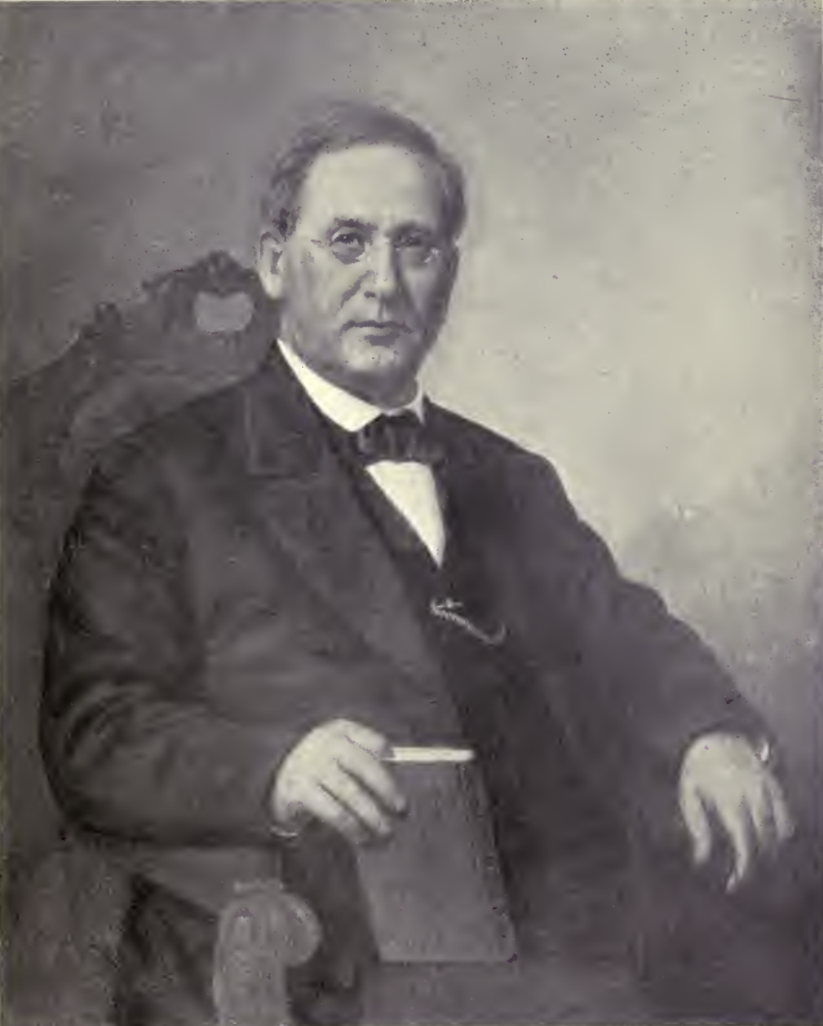
Samuel Harvey Taylor

- January 8 – José Trinidad Cabañas, Honduran general, president and national hero (b. 1805)
- January 13 – Kawakami Gensai, Japanese swordsman of the Bakumatsu period (b. 1834)
- January 15 – Edward C. Delavan, American temperance movement leader (b. 1793)
- January 19 – Sir William Denison, Governor of New South Wales (b. 1804)
- January 21 – Jan Jacob Rochussen, Governor-General of the Dutch East Indies (b. 1797)
- January 25 – Jeanne Villepreux-Power, French marine biologist (b. 1794)
- February 10 – Étienne Constantin de Gerlache, 1st Prime Minister of Belgium (b. 1785)
- February 12 – Alice Cary, American poet, sister of Phoebe Cary (b. 1820)
- February 20 – Paul Kane, Irish-born painter (b. 1810)
- February 22 – Sir Charles Shaw, British army officer and police commissioner (b. 1795)
- February 23 – Amanda Cajander, Finnish medical reformer (b. 1827)
- March – Emma Fürstenhoff, Swedish florist (b. 1802)
- March 18 – Augustus De Morgan, English professor of mathematics, mathematician (b. 1806)
- March 28 – Nora Hood, Aboriginal Australian religious figure (b. c. 1836)
- April 7
  - Prince Alexander John of Wales (b. April 6, prematurely)
  - Wilhelm von Tegetthoff, Austrian admiral (b. 1827)
- April 30 – Jane Clouson, teenaged British murder victim (b. 1854)
- May 11 – John Herschel, English astronomer (b. 1792)
- May 12 – Elzéar-Henri Juchereau Duchesnay, Canadian politician (b. 1809)
- May 18 – Constance Trotti, Belgian salonnière, culture patron (b. 1800)
- May 21 – Antonija Höffern, Slovene noblewoman and educator (b. 1803)
- May 23 – Jarosław Dąbrowski, Polish general (b. 1836)
- June 9 – Anna Atkins, British botanist (b. 1799)

=== July–December ===
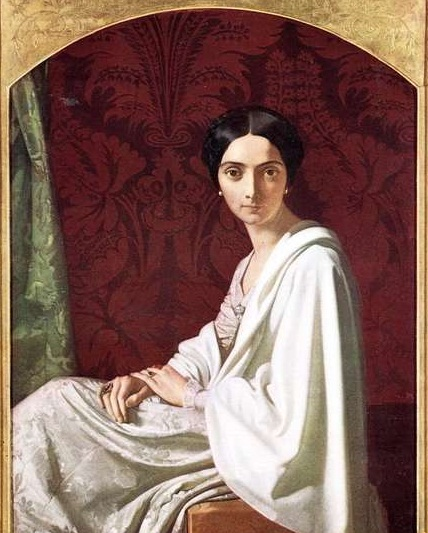
Cristina Trivulzio Belgiojoso

- July 5 – Cristina Trivulzio Belgiojoso, Italian noble, patriot, writer and journalist (b. 1808)
- July 6 – Castro Alves, Brazilian poet and playwright (b. 1847)
- July 15 – Tad Lincoln, youngest son of American President Abraham Lincoln (b. 1853)
- July 31 – Phoebe Cary, American poet, sister to Alice Cary (b. 1824)
- August 9 – John Paterson, politician in the New South Wales Legislative Assembly (b. 1831)
- September 16 – Jan Erazim Vocel, Czech poet, archaeologist, historian and cultural revivalist (b. 1803)
- September 20 – John Patteson, Anglican bishop, missionary (martyred) (b. 1827)
- September 21 – Charlotte Elliott, English hymnwriter (b. 1789)
- September 23 – Louis-Joseph Papineau, Canadian politician (b. 1786)
- October 4 – Sarel Cilliers, Voortrekker leader, preacher (b. 1801)
- October 7 – Sir John Burgoyne, British field marshal (b. 1782)
- October 11 – Joan Cornelis Reynst, Governor-General of the Dutch East Indies (b. 1798)
- October 16 – Martha Hooper Blackler Kalopothakes, American missionary, journalist, translator (b. 1830)
- October 18 – Charles Babbage, English mathematician, inventor (b. 1791)
- October 29 – Andrea Debono, Maltese trader and explorer (b. 1821)
- November 2 – Athalia Schwartz, Danish writer, journalist and educator (b. 1821)
- November 22 – Oscar James Dunn, Lieutenant Governor of Louisiana (b. 1825)
- December 21 – Luise Aston, German author, feminist (b. 1814)
- December 28 – John Henry Pratt, English clergyman, mathematician (b. 1809)
