= 1870 in Austria-Hungary =

- Decades: 1860s; 1870s; 1880s; 1890s
- See also: Other events of 1870; Timeline of Austrian history; Timeline of Hungarian history

The following lists events that happened during 1870 in the Austro-Hungarian Empire.

== Events ==
=== January ===
- January 6 – The Musikverein, Vienna, is inaugurated in Austria-Hungary
