= Clotilde Adnet =

French embroiderer, illegalist anarchist, and counterfeiter

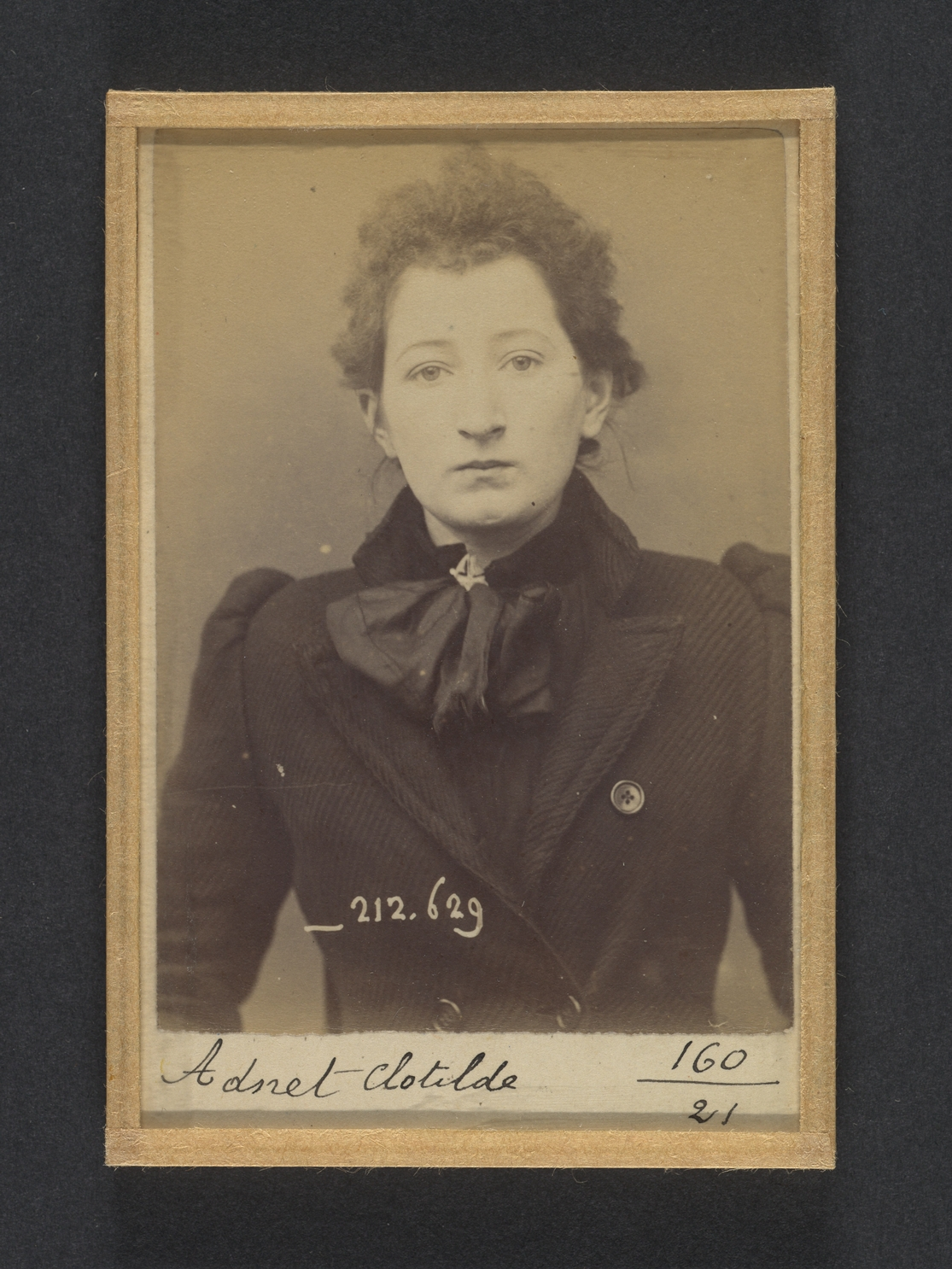
- Clotilde Adnet's mugshot by Alphonse Bertillon (1894)
- Born: 9 November 1874; Argentan
- Died: 30 June 1933 (aged 58); Bagnolet
- Occupations: embroiderer, anarchist, illegalist, counterfeiter
- Movement: Anarchism

Clotilde Adnet (1874–1933) was a French embroiderer, illegalist anarchist, and counterfeiter. She is best known for her actions during the rise of illegalism, where she associated with other young anarchists, forming the Rue des Abbesses gang with them.

Adnet joined the anarchist movement with her sister, Jeanne Adnet, and together with her and other anarchists, formed the Rue des Abbesses gang, which engaged in illegalist activities. After being released and moving to Belgium, she began counterfeiting there, leading to her arrest in 1897 and subsequent conviction to six years in prison. She escaped from prison on 23 May 1897 and managed to outrun the Belgian police pursuing her, arriving in France before heading into exile in England.

While in London with another illegalist, and as the two resumed their counterfeiting activities, they were arrested. Adnet tried to escape by jumping out of a window before being sentenced to five years in prison and then extradited to Belgium. The anarchist later returned to France and married in 1909. She died in Bagnolet on 30 June 1933.

The contemporary press's portrayal of her figure invisibilized her thought and actions.

== Biography ==
=== Youth and anarchism ===
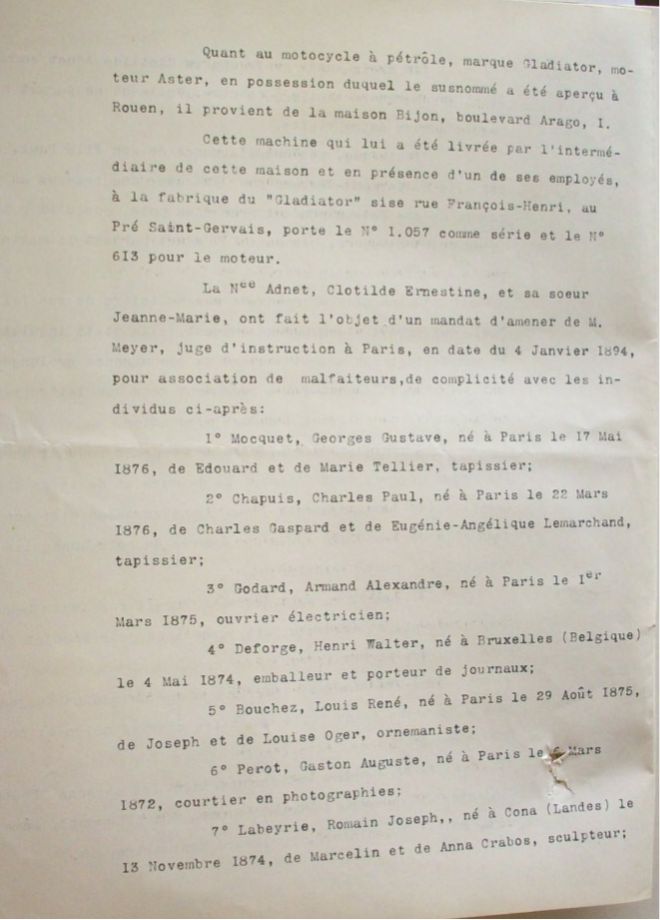
Report on the arrest of the Adnet sisters and their presumed accomplices (courtesy of Archives anarchistes)

Clotilde Ernestine Adnet was born in Argentan on 7 November 1874. According to her birth certificate, her mother's name was Louise Elisabeth Accard, and she was unemployed, while her father's name was Victor Adnet, and he was a railway employee.

With her sister, Jeanne Adnet, she started attending anarchist meetings from 1893. She was convinced by her sister of the merits of anarchism and, unable to "get used to seeing her family in a situation close to poverty", Adnet joined the anarchist movement. The two Adnet sisters formed a group with other young people from Rue des Abbesses and were arrested in early 1894 on charges of criminal association and theft. The case resulted in a dismissal, and she was released.

Adnet moved to Liège with Armand Godard, another group member, at the end of 1896. Both were hosted by the Belgian anarchist Jacques Berré, who had been implicated a few years earlier in the 1892 Liège attempted bombings. There, they produced counterfeit money, specifically fake coins. Adnet was arrested and sentenced to six months in prison, while Godard managed to avoid any repercussions.

Meanwhile, a member of the Abbesses group, Louis Boucher, was arrested for counterfeiting in France, which led to the arrest of most of the group's companions. The two Adnet sisters were the only ones to escape arrest. After serving her sentence and being sent back to France, Adnet returned to Belgium and reunited with Berré, staying at his place for a time, then joined Godard in Ernonheid in April 1897. The two were visited every eight days by Berré, who brought them bags of plaster with his cart. In the following months, the anarchist was noticed for acquiring various chemicals used in counterfeiting.

Adnet, Berré, and Godard were arrested after attempting to circulate counterfeit coins; first Berré, then Godard. After Godard's arrest, their home was raided, and the Belgian police found thousands of fake coins, ingots, chemicals, crucibles—all the tools needed to make counterfeit money. The three were tried, and Adnet was sentenced to six years in prison.

=== Escape from the Petits-Carmes prison ===
On 23 May 1897, Jeanne Adnet visited her sister in prison. The anarchist arrived dressed in dark clothes, her face obscured by a white veil. The two met and took advantage of the visiting room's layout, which consisted of booths separated by grilles, to swap places and clothes. Clotilde Adnet pretended to cry and pity her sister, covering her face with her hands, which led a guard to escort her back to the entrance. Meanwhile, Jeanne went to the cell, and when the guard removed her hood and realized it wasn't the escapee, Jeanne Adnet burst out laughing. She was released a few months later, in July 1897.

=== Exile in the United Kingdom and later years ===
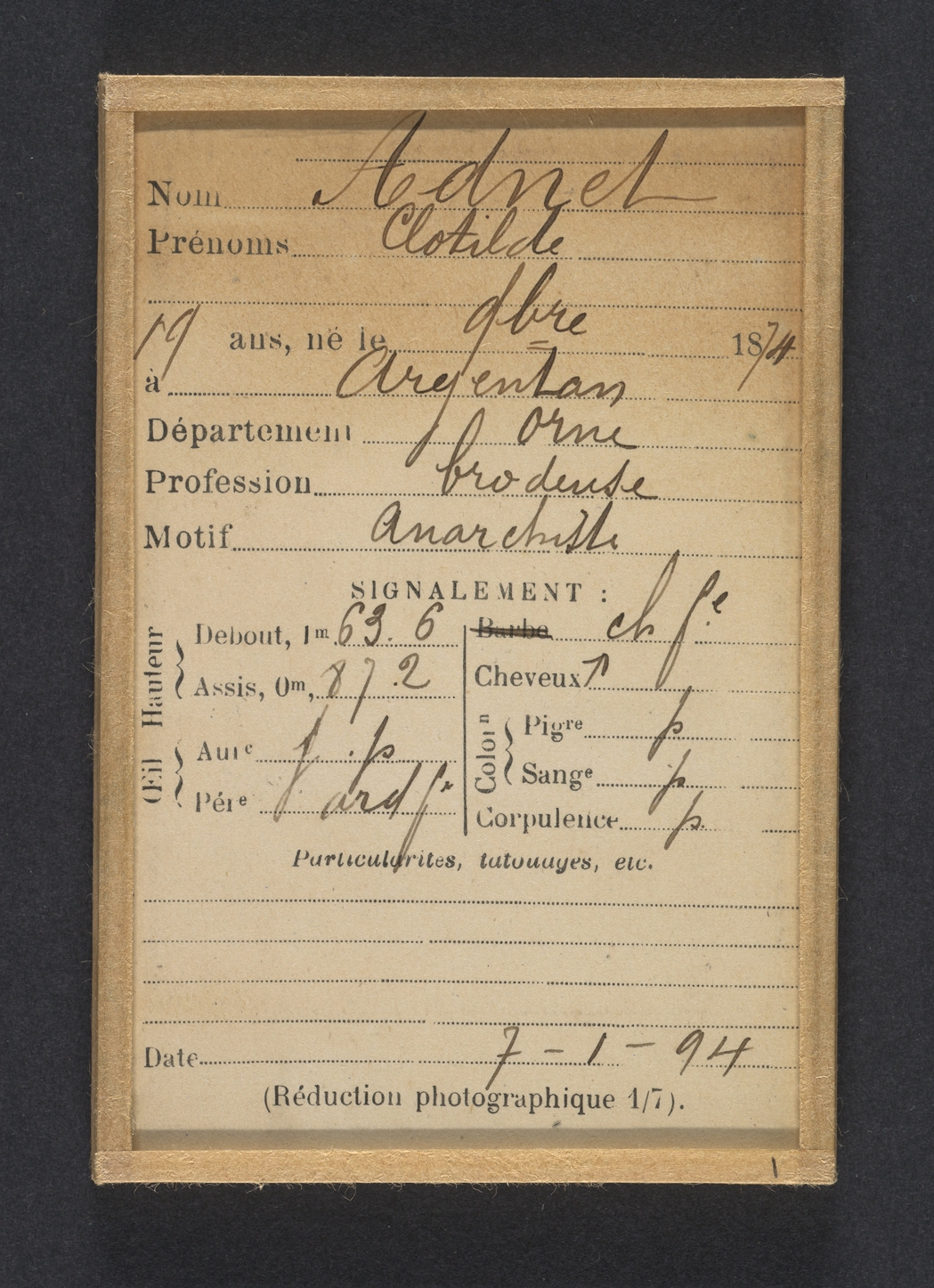
Bertillon file on Clotilde Adnet (1894)

Clotilde Adnet then went on the run, quickly crossing the border into France before taking a packet boat from Calais to England, where she sought refuge in London. The anarchist journalist Séverine published articles defending her in the feminist newspaper La Fronde. She settled with Mathurin-Joseph Auffret, another illegalist anarchist militant, who was manufacturing counterfeit banknotes for the South African National Bank. When the British police came to arrest her, Adnet tried to escape by jumping from a second-story window but was apprehended by officers after taking advantage of the confusion to swallow incriminating documents. She was sentenced to five years in prison and then extradited to Belgium instead.

Adnet subsequently returned to France. She married in 1909 and died in Bagnolet on 30 June 1933.

== Legacy ==
=== Gendered treatment by the contemporary press ===
According to historian Kathryne Adair Corbin, the contemporary press's treatment of Adnet is indicative of a gendered approach towards female illegalists or criminals. Unlike their male counterparts, the press generally gave female illegalists or counterfeiters a much smaller platform, focusing little on their cases and rarely questioning their motivations, situations, or other factors. For example, apart from Séverine, who dedicated several front-page columns in La Fronde to Adnet's case, the rest of the press at the time typically gave her only one or two paragraphs. Her thought and actions were thus invisibilized by the Belle Époque press.

=== Police mugshot ===
Her police mugshot is part of the collections at the Metropolitan Museum of Art (MET).

== Bibliography ==
- Petit, Dominique (2024), "ADNET Clotilde, Ernestine [Dictionnaire des anarchistes]", Dictionnaire des anarchistes (Le Maitron), Paris: Le Maitron des anarchistes
