= Murder of Jane Clouson =

1871 murder in London, England

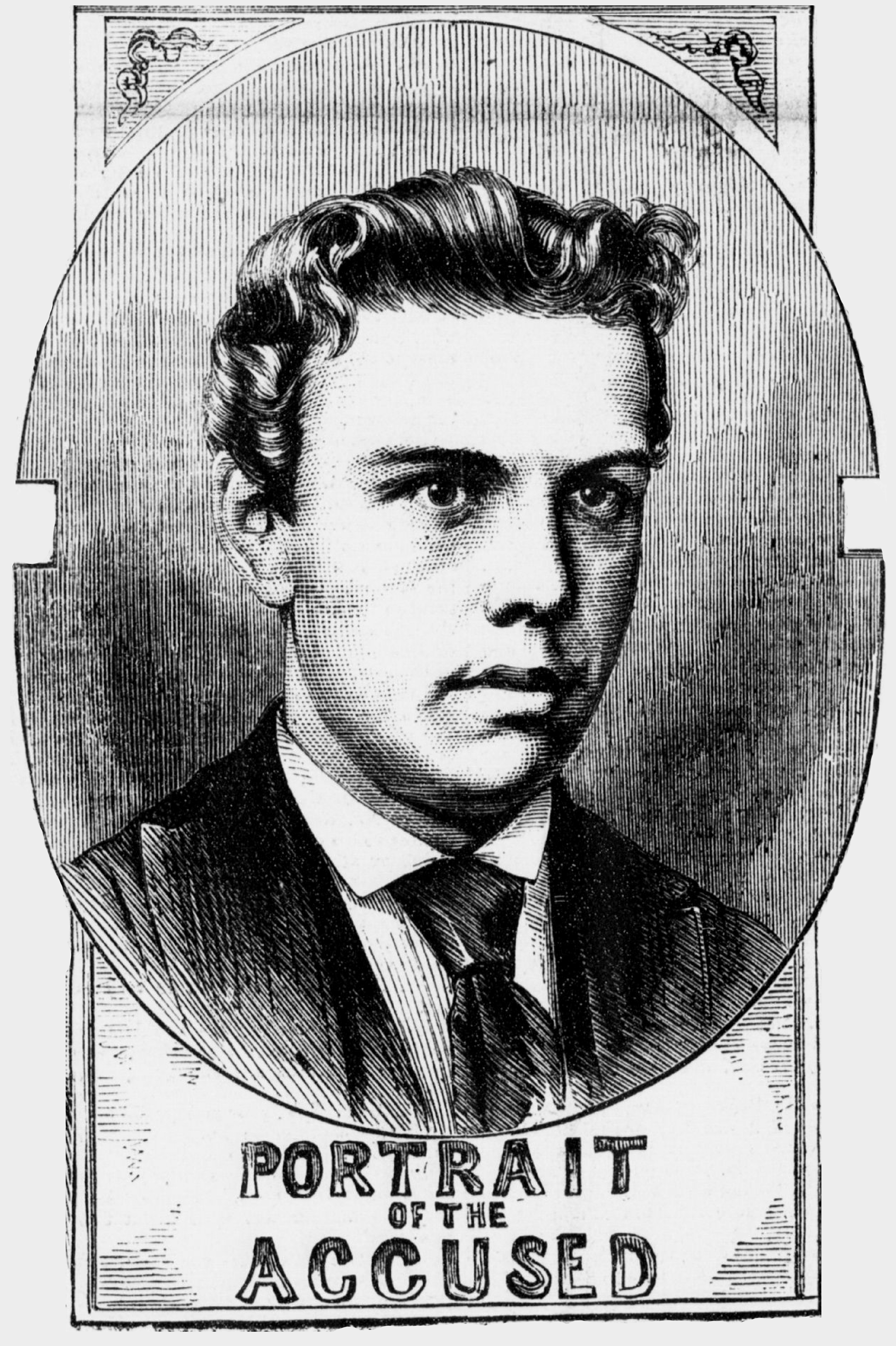
Pook, pictured in the Illustrated Police News, May 1871

Jane Maria Clouson (1854 – 30 April 1871) was found bludgeoned with a hammer and nearly dead in the early hours of April 26, 1871, dying in hospital four days later. Edmund Walter Pook (1851–1920) was charged for her murder, but found not guilty. Clouson's murder has been referred to as the Eltham murder. The murder, and ensuing police investigation and prosecution, were the subject of considerable press attention.

== Murder ==
Clouson was found, bleeding heavily and barely conscious, at about 4am on the morning of April 26, 1871 in Kidbrooke Lane, Eltham. A bloodstained hammer was found lying nearby. Her purse, containing 11s. 4d., was untouched and there was no evidence of sexual assault. It was not immediately possible to identify Clouson.

Before she died Clouson allegedly named Edmund Pook, a printer from Greenwich, as her assailant. It was claimed that Clouson and the 20-year-old Pook, the son of her employer (Clouson was the family maid), had been having an affair lasting several months with the result that she had become pregnant; Edmund would not marry Jane because his brother had already angered his father by marrying beneath his station and Edmund had no intention of doing the same, so Jane was fired from the household. However, this claim was refuted by his parents, who stated that Jane was dismissed following several warnings about her unkempt appearance, and slovenly work habits. It was also claimed that Edmund and Jane had continued their relationship following her dismissal. It was said that they met secretly and corresponded romantically with one another. However, no correspondence from either Jane or Edmund could be found and no witnesses to these secret meetings were able to be presented in court.

It was also alleged that a man matching Pook's description was seen running from the lane; that the bloodstained hammer found at the scene had been sold to him by a local shopkeeper some days earlier; that his trousers were covered in blood and mud; and that there were seven witnesses who swore to having seen Clouson and Pook together that evening.

== Trials ==
The case went to coroner’s trial first - Pook was represented by Henry Pook, a solicitor, not related to Edmund's family, and was found guilty of the wilful murder of Clouson. A full trial was then arranged at the Central Criminal Court at The Old Bailey for 10 July. Pook was defended by John Walter Huddleston, Q.C., with Mr. Harrinton and Mr. Besley assisting, while the prosecution was led by John Coleridge as Solicitor General, with Mr Poland, Mr Archibald, and Mr Beasley assisting. Witnesses included Sergeant Thomas Hodge, Inspector Charles Wilson, Detective Inspector John Mulvany and Superintendent James Griffin of the Metropolitan Police.

During the trial, the judge (Sir William Bovill, sitting as Chief Justice of the Common Pleas) ruled that all statements apparently made by Clouson before her death (including naming Pook as her assailant) were hearsay and therefore inadmissible as evidence. Several other aspects of the prosecution case did not withstand interrogation. On 15 July, the jury acquitted Pook following twenty minutes of deliberation.

== Aftermath ==
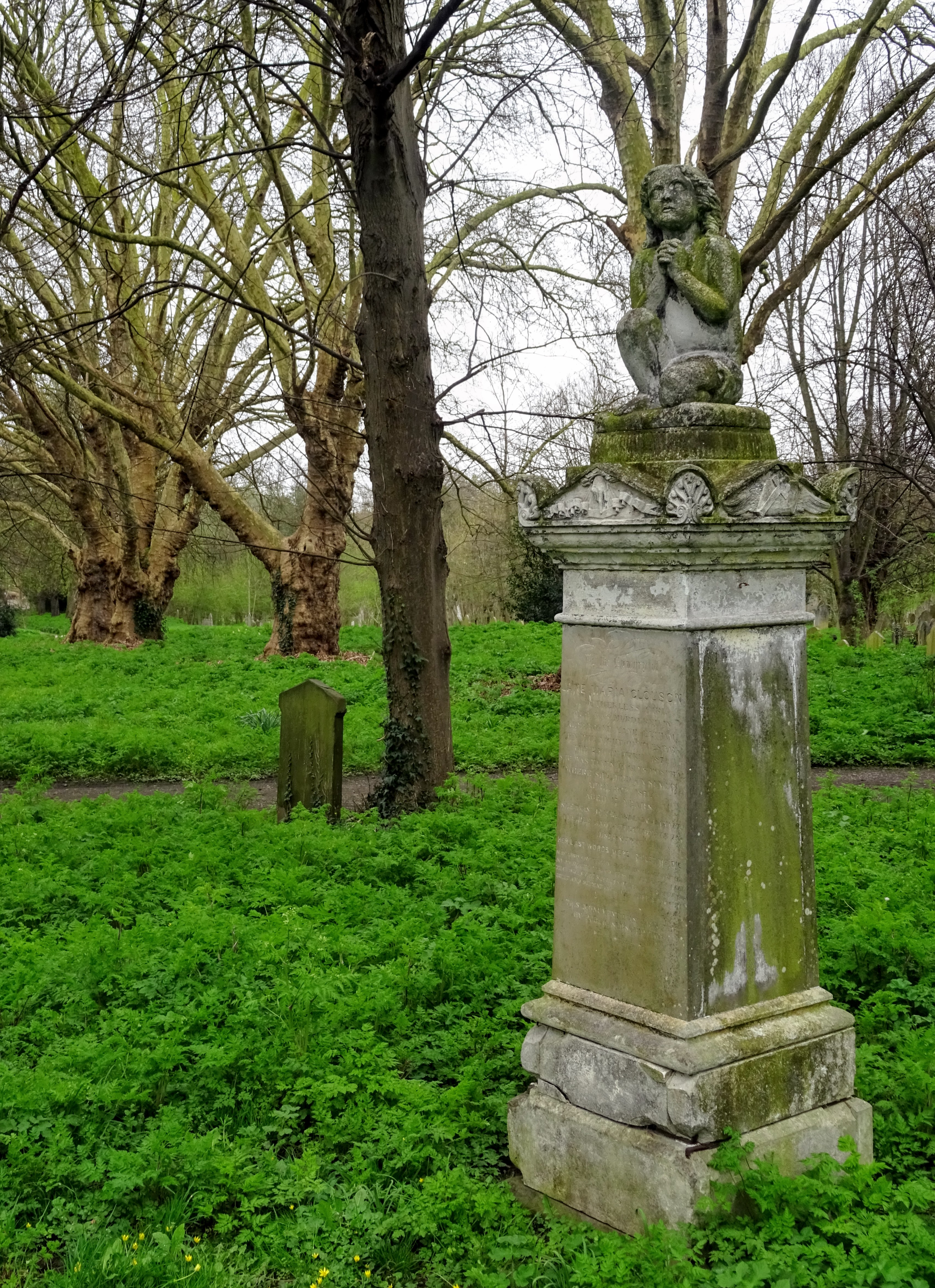
The monument to Clouson in Brockley Cemetery

Newspaper accounts of the time had intimated Edmund's guilt, even before his trial. During the final day of his trial, a large crowd had gathered in the street outside the court, the courtroom being packed with spectators. As his acquittal by jury was announced to the crowd waiting in the street, the mood was one of anger and disappointment. It has been suggested that Edmund had escaped justice because of his social class, and family connections; it was noted that his father (Ebenezer Whitcher Pook) had previously worked for The Times as a tradesman printer.

The murder, and, in particular, the conduct of the police in the case was the subject of an editorial in The Times on 18 July and a Parliamentary question on 20 July. Pook and his family subsequently fled London, changing their identity as they continued to be hounded by the press. Henry Pook later represented Edmund Pook in two subsequent criminal libel suits, where Edmund was openly accused in pamphlets of being a murderer, despite his acquittal.

For many years afterwards the ghost of Clouson was allegedly seen in Kidbrooke Lane, including several reported sightings by patrolling policemen. Appearing in a white dress, her face was said to be running with blood. Her cries for help were also repeatedly heard together with the last groans of her life as she lay dying. People avoided Kidbrooke Lane after dark until finally the lane was built upon and the ghost disappeared.

Clouson was given a memorial at Brockley and Ladywell Cemeteries, erected by public subscription. The monument was paid for by public money and stands alone – a praying child sits on top of a pillar. Below the figure is an inscription detailing the horrific events surrounding her brutal murder: "A motherless girl who was murdered in Kidbrooke Lane, Eltham aged 17 in 1871... Her last words were, 'Oh, let me die'".
