= Constance Trotti =

Belgian noble, socialite, salon holder

Constance Anne Louise Trotti, marchioness Arconati-Visconti (21 July 1800 – 18 May 1871), was a Belgian noble who hosted a leading cultural salon in Brussels. She became known as a patron of artists and Belgian cultural life.

She was born in Vienna to a functionary at the Austrian court and married her cousin Giuseppe Trotti in 1818. In 1821, the couple moved to Brussels (then part of the Netherlands), where she became a leading socialite. She hosted a salon that became the center of the Belgian aristocracy and the French exiled colony, and acted as a patron of Belgian cultural life.
