= Jeanne Adnet =

French seamstress, illegalist anarchist and then socialist

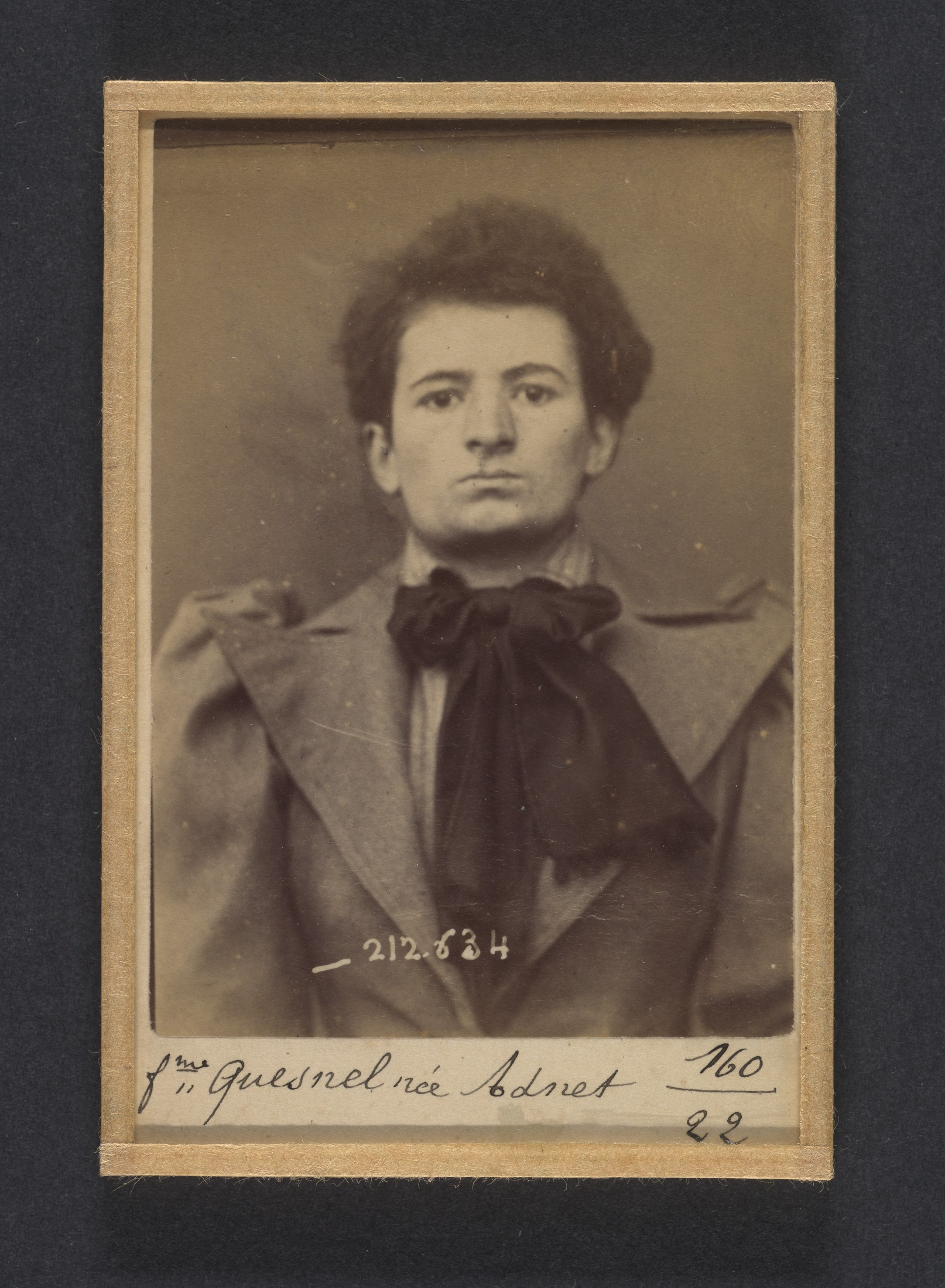
- Jeanne Adnet's mugshot by Alphonse Bertillon (1894)
- Born: 8 January 1871; Argentan
- Died: 26 December 1942 (aged 71); Bagnolet
- Occupations: seamstress, anarchist, socialist
- Movement: Anarchism

Jeanne Adnet (8 January 1871 – 26 December 1942) was a French seamstress, illegalist anarchist and then socialist. Along with some of her close relatives, like her sister Clotilde Adnet, she became involved in the anarchist movement in France during the 1890s.

While married to a socialist activist she found too moderate, Adnet embraced anarchism—influencing her sister to do the same—and was accused of criminal conspiracy with her group, the Rue des Abbesses group. A few years later, following her sister's arrest by Belgian authorities for counterfeiting, Adnet managed to help her escape from prison by taking her place.

She then joined her in England, where she corresponded with Max Nettlau, among others, before returning to France. In the following years, Jeanne Adnet became a socialist activist. She died on 26 December 1942 in Bagnolet.

== Biography ==
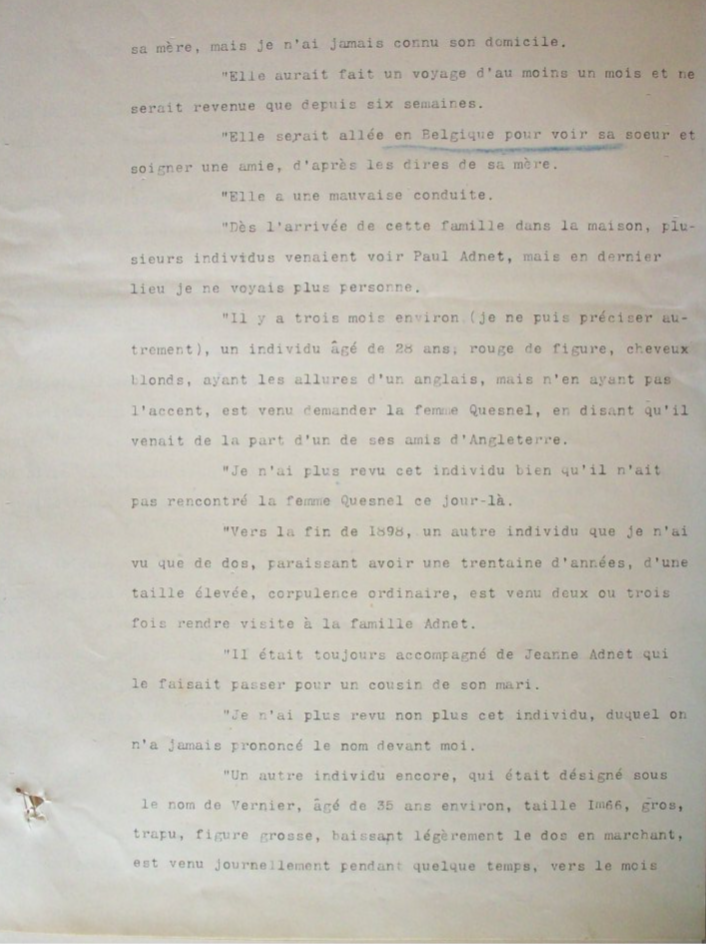
Excerpt of a police informant reporting on Jeanne Adnet's and her relatives activities (courtesy of Archives anarchistes)

Jeanne Marie Alphonsine Adnet was born in Argentan on 8 January 1871. According to her birth certificate, her mother was Louise Elisabeth Accard, who was unemployed, while her father was Victor Adnet, a railway employee.

In 1893, she married Emmanuel Quesnel, then a socialist activist, but found him too moderate. Taking advantage of his absences when he went to run as a socialist candidate in the Nord department, she herself joined the anarchist movement, attending several Parisian anarchist meetings with her sister, Clotilde Adnet, whom she also influenced towards anarchism. These meetings took place in various locations, but particularly within the group of young people who met on Rue des Abbesses. In early 1894, Quesnel and Adnet separated after six months of living together.

During the repression of January and February 1894, Adnet was arrested on 8 January 1894 with her sister for criminal association in connection with this entire group; implicated by the police in thefts.

Following Clotilde Adnet's conviction in Belgium to six years in prison for counterfeiting, Jeanne visited her several times. She deeply loved her sister and decided to help her escape from the Petits-Carmes prison in Brussels.

=== Escape from Petits-Carmes prison ===
On 23 May 1897, Adnet visited her sister in prison. The anarchist arrived dressed in dark clothes, her face obscured by a white veil. The two met and took advantage of the visiting room's layout, which consisted of booths separated by grilles, to swap places and clothes. Clotilde Adnet pretended to cry and pity her sister, covering her face with her hands, which led a guard to escort her back to the entrance. Meanwhile, Jeanne went to the cell, and when the guard removed her hood and realized it wasn't the escapee, Adnet burst out laughing. She was released a few months later, in July 1897.

=== Later years and death ===
Following the escape and her release, the two sisters returned to France and met with anarchist journalist Séverine, who advised Clotilde to flee to England. Clotilde did so, and Jeanne joined her there. During this period, Jeanne corresponded with Max Nettlau, among others, asking him to help secure a lawyer for her sister, who was facing potential extradition to Belgium.

She later returned to France and became involved in the socialist movement in the following years. In 1920, she resigned from the Committee for the Reconstruction of the International and signed the declaration of the Committee of the Third International.

Jeanne Adnet died on 26 December 1942 in Bagnolet.

== Legacy ==
=== Police mugshot ===
Her police mugshot is part of the collections of the Metropolitan Museum of Art (MET).

== Bibliography ==
- Petit, Dominique (2024), "ADNET Jeanne, Marie, Alphonsine. épouse Quesnel", Dictionnaire des anarchistes (Le Maitron), Paris: Le Maitron des anarchistes
