= Birdie Blye =

American pianist

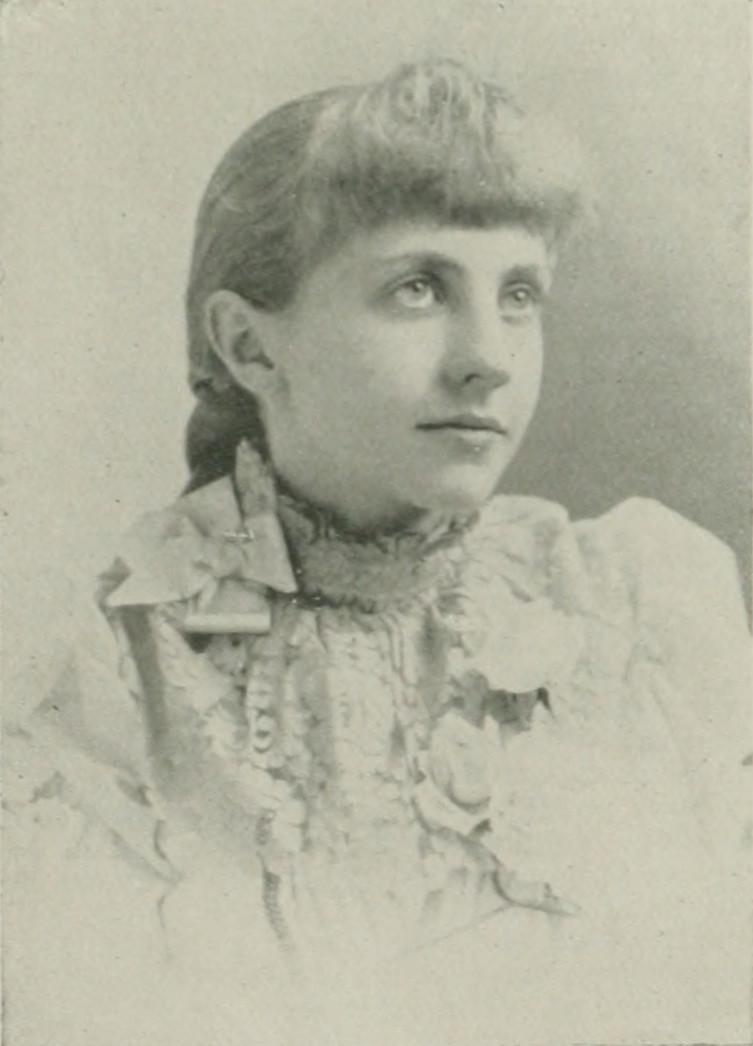
- Born: Birdice Blye; March 24, 1871; Sioux City, Iowa, U.S.
- Died: June 23, 1935 (aged 64); Chicago, Illinois, U.S.
- Resting place: Fairlawn Cemetery
- Occupation: Pianist
- Spouse: William B. S. Richardson (m. 1901)
- Writing career
- Notable work: reminiscences of Anton Rubinstein

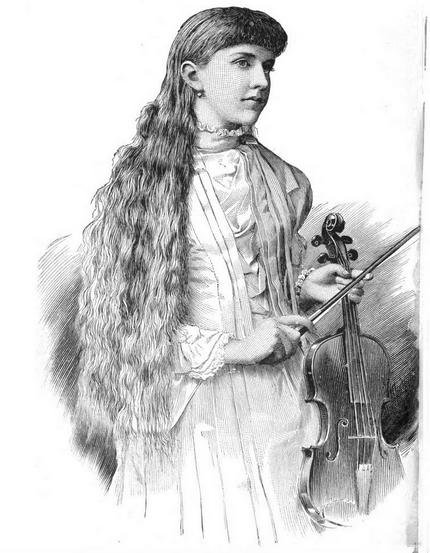
Blye with violin

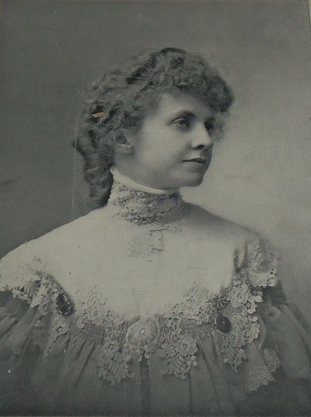
Blye in 1905

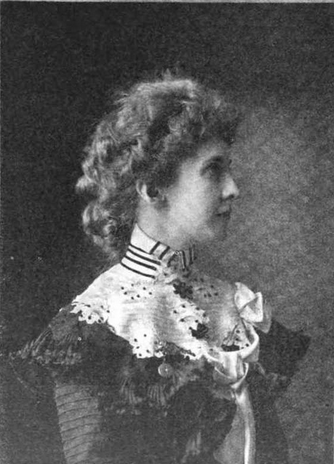
Birdice Blye-Richardson

Birdice Blye-Richardson (March 24, 1871–June 23, 1935) better known as Birdie Blye, was an American pianist. At 5 years old she was "an infant prodigy" who was taught by the best teachers in the United States and Europe. At the age of 10, she gave concerts in London and other European cities. She was the only American who ever played at so early an age in orchestral concerts.

Blye began her training in New York City under Edmund Neupert and Rafael Joseffy. She then went to the Royal Academy of Music in London. After returning to the U.S., she played concerts in Eastern cities with the Seidl Orchestra. Anton Seidl and William Steinway advised her to study in Germany, which she did for six years, first under Hans von Bülow, then in the Royal Hochschule in Berlin, and finally under Anton Rubinstein. She was the only American pupil Rubinstein ever took. She was twice a guest at the White House in Washington, D.C.

== Early years and education ==
Birdice Blye was born in Sioux City, Iowa, (Note: Although Willard and Livermore mention New York City as place of birth, it seems that Sioux City, Iowa is more probable per Lockwood and Cook County Deaths.) on March 24, 1871. (Note: Although Weiser and Arbeiter mention 1887, Cook County Deaths record state March 24, 1871, while Willard and Livermore only go so far as recording "187-".) However, she spent so little time in Sioux City, and so much time with her grandmother in Southern Indiana that she considered her home there. By 1887, she was living in Kentland, Indiana.

On her father's side, Blye was related to John Hancock, one of the signers of the Declaration of Independence, and to the Lees of Virginia. Her mother's forefathers were of English nobility.

Blye manifested a love of music at an early age. At age five, she played in concert at Chicago.

For some time, Blye pursued her studies in New York City with Edmund Neupert, Edward Mollenhauer, and Rafael Joseffy. In London, she studied in the Academy, winning medals. After a series of concerts in the principal Eastern cities, where she was received with perfect ovations and where she played with Anton Seidl's orchestra, Mr. Seidl and Mr. William Steinway were so impressed with her wonderful talent that they urged her to go to Germany. In Germany, she studied under Hans von Bülow, in the Royal Hochschule in Berlin, and finally under Anton Rubinstein.

Highly educated, a linguist of note, Blye painted in oils and water colors. She studied painting in the Grosvenor Gallery in London. Her first exhibited picture, painted when she was 14, was sold for $75.

== Career ==
=== Early years ===
Blye made her first appearance in New York City in November 1886, at Steinway Hall.

During the nine years of her stay abroad she made concert tours of the principal European cities and besides played again and again at social entertainments for members of the royal families of England and Germany, and such distinguished persons as the Baroness Rothschild, the Empress Eugenie, and Princess Bismarck.

At ten years of age, she made a sensation in London and European cities with her playing and won the praise of the critics in London, Paris, Dresden, Berlin, Vienna and other musical centers of the old world. When eleven years of age, she made her debut in orchestral concerts in London and in Europe with success. She played from memory concertos, sonatas and other compositions by Mendelssohn, Beethoven, Schumann, Liszt, Schubert, and Chopin. Blye could play the whole clavichord without notes and transpose in every key. She received many certificates and medals, and was feted and admired as the little "wonder child."

In the early 1890s, she played in more than 200 concerts and musicals in American, English and European cities. She was an excellent violinist, a pupil of the Joachim School of Berlin.

Later, she entered studies with Anton Rubinstein, who was enthusiastic in praise of her many musical qualities and introduced her to the prominent musicians of Germany as “the great American pianiste.” Blye wrote her reminiscences of the great master for the Musical Courier and afterward revised to read before the Authors’ Association and prominent clubs. This and other articles were extensively copied by the press and proved that Blye was also a talented writer. Blye has used the Steinway piano from the very beginning of her career.

Among Blye's hundreds of autograph photographs was one of Longfellow, who named her “the little golden-haired princess.” Bancroft, the historian, sent her baskets of roses from his rose gardens, saving: “Even the roses bloomed brighter in her presence.” There was also a picture of the gallant General Sherman, who gave her a letter to the Ambassador at the Court of St. James, James Russell Lowell, the poet, which read: “I send with this the sweetest poem in the English language, entitled Birdie Blye.”

=== Later years ===
On September 18, 1901, she married William B. S. Richardson, M.D., and they made a home in Chicago.

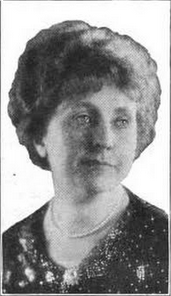
Blye in 1921

In 1921, Blye spent three and a half months in California. On her way there, she gave recitals in Texas in Beaumont, Houston, and San Antonio. This was Blye's seventh season in San Antonio, where she has given recitals before leading musical organizations and colleges, and played twice with the Symphony Orchestra, under Arthur Claassen. Dinners and receptions were given in her honor, and Clara Madison dedicated her “Berceuse” to Blye. In California, Blye gave her first recital in San Jose. She appeared in San Francisco and Pomonoa. In Los Angeles, Blye was guest of the Gamut Club at dinner on Ladies' Night; also of the Musicians' Club. She spent several days with Dean and Mrs. Ethelbert Grabill; Dean Grabill dedicated his latest composition to Blye. Dinners were given in her honor by Mr. and Mrs. Homer Grunn, Mr. and Mrs. W. A. Roberts, and Mr. and Mrs. Cassius. In San Francisco Sir Henry Heyman, dean of musicians in California, gave a “coffee” for Blye and presented her with an autographed photograph. Blye renewed her friendship with Mrs. Israel Proctor, whose husband was the California surgeon. She was also guest of Lulu Blumberg, president of the Pacific Musical Society.

Blye died June 23, 1935.
