= 1896 in Scotland =

- Centuries: 17th; 18th; 19th; 20th; 21st
- Decades: 1870s; 1880s; 1890s; 1900s; 1910s
- See also: List of years in Scotland; Timeline of Scottish history 1896 in: The UK • Wales • Elsewhere; Scottish football: 1895–96 • 1896–97

Events from the year 1896 in Scotland.

== Incumbents ==
- Secretary for Scotland and Keeper of the Great Seal – Lord Balfour of Burleigh

=== Law officers ===
- Lord Advocate – Sir Charles Pearson until May; then Andrew Murray
- Solicitor General for Scotland – Andrew Murray; then Charles Dickson

=== Judiciary ===
- Lord President of the Court of Session and Lord Justice General – Lord Robertson
- Lord Justice Clerk – Lord Kingsburgh

== Events ==
- January – first Caledonian Railway 721 Class ("Dunalastair") steam locomotive is turned out from its St. Rollox railway works in Springburn, Glasgow.
- 14 March – 1896 Scottish Cup Final is played at New Logie Green, home ground of St Bernard's F.C. in Edinburgh (the only time the final is ever played outside Glasgow) between Edinburgh derby rivals Heart of Midlothian and Hibernian F.C.; Hearts win 3–1.
- 14 December – Glasgow Subway, the third oldest metro system in the world (after the London Underground and the Budapest Metro), begins operations in Glasgow.
- The first Arrol-Johnston automobile is produced, in Glasgow.
- Replacement Stroma Lighthouse built.
- A new Royal Observatory, Edinburgh, is established on Blackford Hill, replacing that on Calton Hill, under the auspices of Ralph Copeland, Astronomer Royal for Scotland.
- Glasgow District Pauper Lunatic Asylum opened at Gartloch.
- The Society of Antiquaries of Scotland begins excavating Ardoch Roman Fort.
- First Scottish bar managed under the Gothenburg Public House System opened by the Fife Coal Company at Hill of Beath.
- The Famous Grouse Scotch whisky first blended by Matthew Gloag & Son of Perth.

== Births ==
- 14 February – Andrew Wilson, international footballer (died 1973)
- 26 February – Mairi Chisholm, nurse and ambulance driver in World War I, one of "The Madonnas of Pervyse" (died 1981)
- 25 May – William Kennedy-Cochran-Patrick, flying ace in World War I (killed in aviation accident 1933 in South Africa)
- 19 July – A. J. Cronin, novelist and physician (died 1981)
- 25 July – Josephine Tey, born Elizabeth MacKintosh, novelist (died 1952)
- 15 August – Douglas Wimberley, soldier (died 1983)
- 24 September – Abe Moffat, miner, trade unionist and communist activist (died 1975)
- 14 December – Rita Taketsuru, born Jessie Roberta Cowan, "mother of Japanese whisky" (died 1961 in Japan)
- Date unknown – Flora Woodman, soprano (died 1981)

== Deaths ==
- 8 January – Colin Blackburn, Baron Blackburn, judge (born 1813)
- 22 January – Daniel Kinnear Clark, mechanical engineer (born 1822)
- 23 July – Caroline Martyn, Christian socialist and trade unionist (born 1867 in England)

== The arts ==
- Charles Rennie Mackintosh produces stencilled friezes for Catherine Cranston's Buchanan Street tearooms in Glasgow.
- Jane Findlater's novel The Green Graves of Balgowrie is published.
- Robert Louis Stevenson's novel Weir of Hermiston, left unfinished at his death in 1894, is published.
- The Ecclesiastical Architecture of Scotland is published by Scottish architects David MacGibbon and Thomas Ross.

== See also ==
- Timeline of Scottish history
- 1896 in Ireland
