= 1892 in Scotland =

- Centuries: 17th; 18th; 19th; 20th; 21st
- Decades: 1870s; 1880s; 1890s; 1900s; 1910s
- See also: List of years in Scotland; Timeline of Scottish history 1892 in: The UK • Wales • Elsewhere; Scottish football: 1891–92 • 1892–93

Events from the year 1892 in Scotland.

== Incumbents ==
- Secretary for Scotland and Keeper of the Great Seal – The Marquess of Lothian, until 11 August; then Sir George Trevelyan, Bt

=== Law officers ===
- Lord Advocate – Sir Charles Pearson until August; then John Blair Balfour
- Solicitor General for Scotland – Andrew Murray; then Alexander Asher

=== Judiciary ===
- Lord President of the Court of Session and Lord Justice General – Lord Robertson
- Lord Justice Clerk – Lord Kingsburgh

== Events ==
- 29 January – Original bridge at Bonar Bridge swept away by flood.
- February – Scottish Universities Commissioners publish an ordinance authorising Scottish universities to provide for the education and graduation of women for the first time.
- 9 April – Celtic F.C. win the Scottish Cup for the first time.
- 4–18 July – At the 1892 general election, Keir Hardie, standing as an Independent Labour Party candidate, wins the London seat of West Ham South.
- 5 July – Central Library, Aberdeen, opened by entrepreneur Andrew Carnegie.
- 6 September – Dundee Whaling Expedition begins.
- 8 September – Cunard liner RMS Campania is launched by the Fairfield Shipbuilding and Engineering Company at Govan
- 26 November – The original Jenners department store in Edinburgh is destroyed by fire.
- South Parish (later St Mark's) Church, Aberdeen opened
- Foundation stone of new St Cuthbert's Church, Edinburgh laid.
- Scottish Church Society founded.
- New Templeton's Carpet Factory building on Glasgow Green completed.
- Alexander Grant develops the original recipe for McVitie's digestive biscuit in Edinburgh.

== Births ==
- 25 March – Andy Clyde, screen actor (died 1967 in the United States)
- 13 April – Robert Watson-Watt, pioneer of radar (died 1973)
- 11 August – Hugh MacDiarmid, poet (died 1978)
- 2 October – Mab Copland Lineman, attorney in the United States (died 1957 in the United States)
- 14 October – Saira Elizabeth Luiza Shah, born Elizabeth Louise MacKenzie, writer as Morag Murray Abdullah (died 1960)
- 14 November – Nora Connolly O'Brien, Irish political activist, daughter of James Connolly (died 1981 in Ireland)
- 18 November – D. E. Stevenson, romantic novelist (died 1973)
- 14 December – Jimmy McColl, footballer (died 1978)
- 25 December – Dorothy Johnstone, painter (died 1980 in Wales)

== Deaths ==
- 28 August – William Forbes Skene, historian and antiquary (born 1809)
- 22 September – George Sutherland-Leveson-Gower, 3rd Duke of Sutherland (born 1828 in London)
- 23 September – George Grub, church historian (born 1812)
- 5 October – Alexander Carnegie Kirk, mechanical engineer (born 1830)

== The arts ==
- October – first Gaelic mòd, predecessor of the Royal National Mòd, held in Oban
- 7 November – Empire Palace Theatre opens in Edinburgh, designed for impresario Edward Moss by Frank Matcham

== See also ==
- Timeline of Scottish history
- 1892 in Ireland
