= 1891 in Scotland =

- Centuries: 17th; 18th; 19th; 20th; 21st
- Decades: 1870s; 1880s; 1890s; 1900s; 1910s
- See also: List of years in Scotland; Timeline of Scottish history 1891 in: The UK • Wales • Elsewhere; Scottish football: 1890–91 • 1891–92

Events from the year 1891 in Scotland.

== Incumbents ==
- Secretary for Scotland and Keeper of the Great Seal – The Marquess of Lothian

=== Law officers ===
- Lord Advocate – James Robertson until August; vacant until October; then Sir Charles Pearson
- Solicitor General for Scotland – Sir Charles Pearson; then Andrew Murray

=== Judiciary ===
- Lord President of the Court of Session and Lord Justice General – Lord Glencorse until 20 August; then from 21 September Lord Robertson
- Lord Justice Clerk – Lord Kingsburgh

== Events ==
- January – attempts by Scottish railway companies to evict their striking workers from company housing are resisted by force.
- 30 April – An Comunn Gàidhealach is formally instituted.
- 21 May – Dumbarton and Rangers are declared joint champions after drawing a play-off game 2–2 at Cathkin Park, Glasgow at the end of the inaugural season of the Scottish Football League.
- 21 July – City of Glasgow Act extends city boundaries and transfers ownership of Glasgow Botanic Gardens to the corporation.
- September – Hugh Munro publishes the first table of mountains in Scotland over 3,000 feet (914.4 m), in the Scottish Mountaineering Club Journal; these become known as the Munros.
- 16 November–27 February 1892 – Buffalo Bill's Wild West show is resident at the former East End Exhibition Buildings in Glasgow.
- 18 December – the largest conventional civilian sailing ship ever built on the River Clyde, the 5-masted barque-rigged steel-hulled vessel Maria Rickmers (3,822 GRT), is launched by Russell & Co. at Port Glasgow for Rickmers Reederei of Bremerhaven.
- Hydroelectricity installation at Fort Augustus Abbey.
- The Honourable Company of Edinburgh Golfers moves from Musselburgh to a new private course at Muirfield.

== Births ==
- 7 February – D. Alan Stevenson, lighthouse engineer and philatelist (died 1971)
- 2 April – Jack Buchanan, actor and producer (died 1957)
- 9 April – Agnes Mure Mackenzie, historian and writer (died 1955)
- 7 May – Harry McShane, socialist (died 1988)
- 8 November – Neil M. Gunn, novelist (died 1973)

== Deaths ==
- 12 March – John Dick Peddie, architect, businessman and Liberal Party MP for Kilmarnock Burghs (1880–1885) (born 1824)
- 19 April – Hugh Smellie, steam locomotive engineer (born 1840)
- 11 May – Alexander Beith, Free Church minister (born 1799)
- 20 August – John Inglis, Lord Glencorse, judge (born 1810)
- 15 September – Sir John Steell, sculptor (born 1804)
- 22 November – John Gregorson Campbell, folklorist and Free Church minister (born 1836)
- 22 December – William Smith, architect (born 1817)

== The arts ==
- J. M. Barrie's novel The Little Minister is published.
- Màiri Mhòr nan Òran (Mary MacPherson)'s Gaelic Songs and Poems is published.
- The ensemble attached to the Glasgow Choral Union is formally recognised as the Scottish Orchestra, predecessor of the Royal Scottish National Orchestra.

== See also ==
- Timeline of Scottish history
- 1891 in Ireland
