= 1895 in Scotland =

- Centuries: 17th; 18th; 19th; 20th; 21st
- Decades: 1870s; 1880s; 1890s; 1900s; 1910s
- See also: List of years in Scotland; Timeline of Scottish history 1895 in: The UK • Wales • Elsewhere; Scottish football: 1894–95 • 1895–96

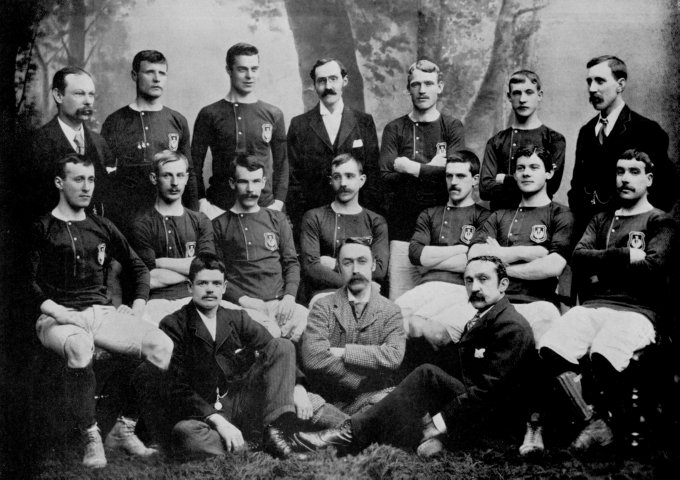
The Scotland national football team: (back row, l-r) SFA vice-president RF Harrison, John Drummond, William Lambie, SFA president Archibald Sliman, David Russell, Neil Gibson, SFA treasurer R Dixon; (middle row, l-r) William Gulliland, James Simpson, Tom Waddell, James Oswald, John McPherson, Dan Doyle, Dan McArthur; (front row, l-r) R Foyers, SFA secretary JK McDowall, trainer J Taylor

Events from the year 1895 in Scotland.

== Incumbents ==
- Secretary for Scotland and Keeper of the Great Seal – Sir George Trevelyan, Bt, to 29 June; then Lord Balfour of Burleigh

=== Law officers ===
- Lord Advocate – John Blair Balfour until July; then Sir Charles Pearson
- Solicitor General for Scotland – Thomas Shaw; then Andrew Murray

=== Judiciary ===
- Lord President of the Court of Session and Lord Justice General – Lord Robertson
- Lord Justice Clerk – Lord Kingsburgh

== Events ==
- 11 February – the lowest ever UK temperature of −27.2 °C (measured as −17 °F) is recorded at Braemar in Aberdeenshire. (This UK Weather Record is equalled in 1982 and again in 1995.)
- 11 April – electric light is introduced in Edinburgh.
- 13 April – first cremation in Scotland's first crematorium, at Glasgow's Western Necropolis.
- July–August – second "Race to the North": Operators of the East and West Coast Main Line railways accelerate their services between London and Aberdeen.
- 28 October
  - The Daily Record newspaper is first published.
  - Probable date of the first car shipped into Scotland, a Panhard for Glasgow engineer George Johnston.
- Percy Pilcher flies in several versions of his hang glider Bat at Cardross, Argyll, the first person to make repeated heavier-than-air flights in the UK.
- Sule Skerry lighthouse completed.
- New Dunoon Pier built.
- New offices for The Glasgow Herald (later The Lighthouse), designed by John Keppie and worked on by Charles Rennie Mackintosh.
- New premises for Jenners department store in Princes Street, Edinburgh, completed.
- The North British Aluminium Company builds Britain's first aluminium smelting plant on the shore of Loch Ness at Foyers.
- Babcock & Wilcox Ltd establish a manufacturing facility at Renfrew based on the existing Porterfield Foundry.
- Paterson's begin baking oatcakes in Rutherglen.

== Births ==
- 2 March – Hughie Ferguson, footballer (suicide 1930)
- 9 March – Isobel Baillie, soprano (died 1983)
- 29 March – Anne Redpath, still life painter (died 1965)
- 19 May – Charles Sorley, poet (killed in action 1915)
- 17 June – George MacLeod, soldier and minister of religion (died 1991)
- 16 July – Hay Petrie, character actor (died 1948)
- 25 August – R. D. Low, comics writer and editor (died 1980)
- 3 October – George Henry Tatham Paton, recipient of the Victoria Cross (killed in action 1917)

== Deaths ==
- 18 June – Lord Colin Campbell, Liberal politician who sat in the House of Commons from 1878 to 1885 and probable adulterer (born 1853)
- 22 August – Peter Denny, shipbuilder and owner (born 1821)
- George Thompson, shipowner and politician (born 1804)

== See also ==
- Timeline of Scottish history
- 1895 in Ireland
