= 1898 in Scotland =

- Centuries: 17th; 18th; 19th; 20th; 21st
- Decades: 1870s; 1880s; 1890s; 1900s; 1910s
- See also: List of years in Scotland; Timeline of Scottish history 1898 in: The UK • Wales • Elsewhere; Scottish football: 1897–98 • 1898–99

Events from the year 1898 in Scotland.

== Incumbents ==
- Secretary for Scotland and Keeper of the Great Seal – Lord Balfour of Burleigh

=== Law officers ===
- Lord Advocate – Andrew Murray
- Solicitor General for Scotland – Charles Dickson

=== Judiciary ===
- Lord President of the Court of Session and Lord Justice General – Lord Robertson
- Lord Justice Clerk – Lord Kingsburgh

== Events ==
- 22 January – the People's Palace on Glasgow Green opens.
- 18 October – Trinity Chain Pier at Trinity, Edinburgh, collapses in a storm.
- 1 November – completion throughout of the Highland Railway's Inverness and Aviemore Direct Railway.
- The Madelvic Motor Carriage Company opens its factory for the manufacture of electric vehicles in Granton, Edinburgh, one of the first purpose-built car factories in the U.K. The company goes into liquidation in December 1899.
- Charles Rennie Mackintosh carries out the interior design for Catherine Cranston's tearooms in Argyle Street, Glasgow, including the first appearance of his characteristic high-backed chair.
- Scottish-born American industrialist Andrew Carnegie purchases Skibo Castle in Sutherland (which he has been leasing for a year).
- Construction of Glenborrodale Castle on the Ardnamurchan peninsula as a guest residence for mining magnate Charles Rudd by architect Sydney Mitchell begins.
- United Collieries Ltd formed in Glasgow to acquire coal mining companies.
- The Church of Scotland introduces the Church Hymnary.

== Births ==
- 13 February – Duncan Campbell, evangelical revivalist (died 1972)
- 7 April – Dorothy Renton, gardener (died 1966)
- 26 April – John Grierson, documentary film maker (died 1972 in England)
- 28 April – William Soutar, poet (died 1943)
- 18 July – John Stuart, actor (died 1979)
- 31 July – Doris Zinkeisen, theatrical designer and commercial artist (died 1991 in England)
- 11 September – John Meikle, winner of the Victoria Cross (killed 1918 on the Western Front (World War I))
- 27 December – W. C. Sellar, humourist (died 1951 in England)
- William Gillies, painter (died 1973)

== Deaths ==
- 21 July – William Alexander Hunter, academic lawyer and Liberal politician (born 1844)
- 16 October – John Ritchie Findlay, newspaper owner and philanthropist (born 1824)
- 7 November – Màiri Mhòr nan Òran, Gaelic poet (born 1821)
- 10 December – William Black, novelist (born 1841)

== See also ==
- Timeline of Scottish history
- 1898 in Ireland
