= 1890 in Scotland =

- Centuries: 17th; 18th; 19th; 20th; 21st
- Decades: 1870s; 1880s; 1890s; 1900s; 1910s
- See also: List of years in Scotland; Timeline of Scottish history 1890 in: The UK • Wales • Elsewhere; Scottish football: 1889–90 • 1890–91

Events from the year 1890 in Scotland.

== Incumbents ==
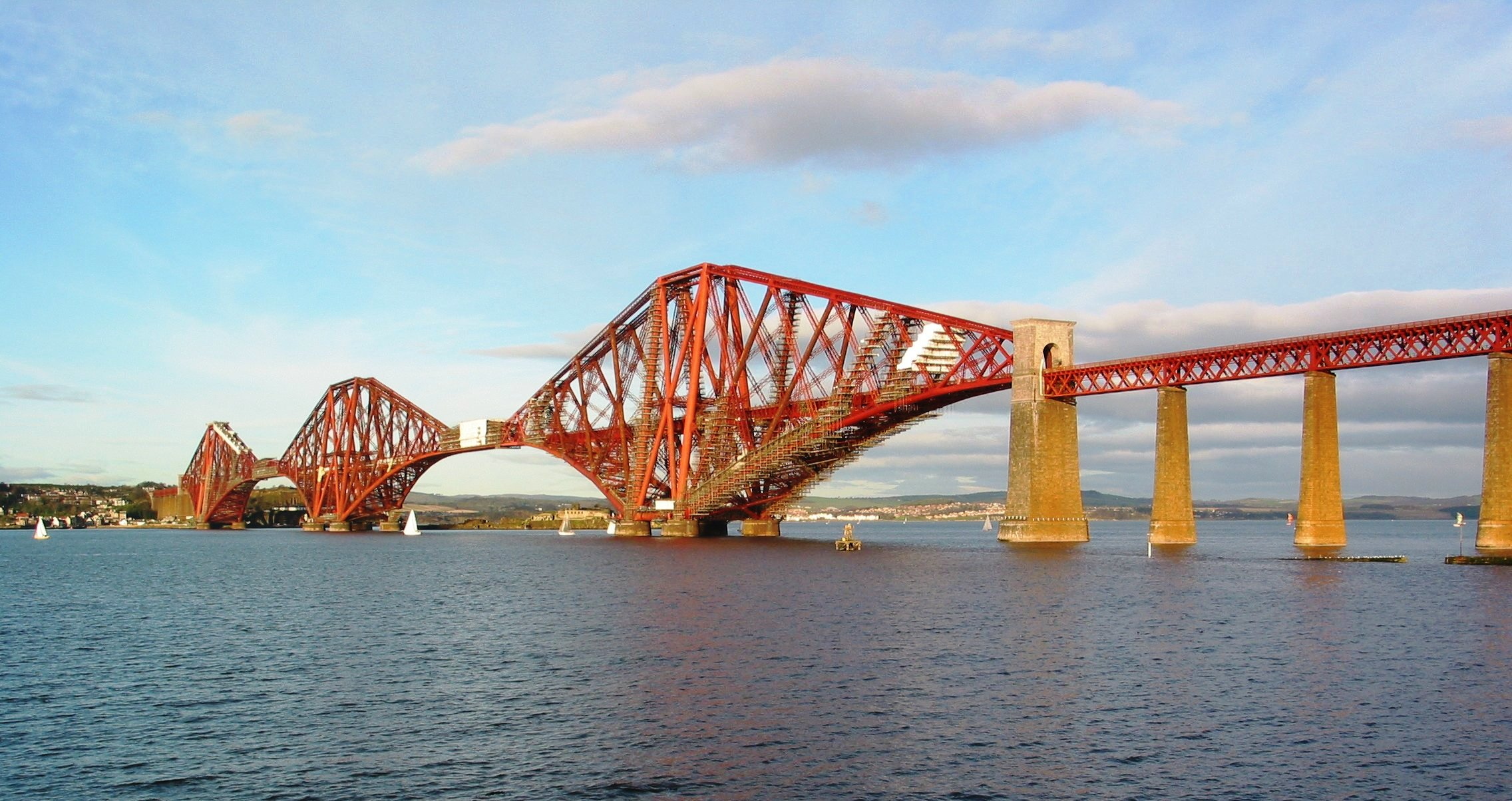
Forth Bridge

- Secretary for Scotland and Keeper of the Great Seal – The Marquess of Lothian

=== Law officers ===
- Lord Advocate – James Robertson
- Solicitor General for Scotland – Moir Tod Stormonth Darling; then Sir Charles Pearson

=== Judiciary ===
- Lord President of the Court of Session and Lord Justice General – Lord Glencorse
- Lord Justice Clerk – Lord Kingsburgh

== Events ==
- 11 February – the Partick by-election in Lanarkshire is won by the Liberal Unionist candidate James Parker Smith.
- 4 March – the Forth Bridge (1,710 ft) is opened to rail traffic.
- 15 May – new elected county councils in Scotland, created by the Local Government (Scotland) Act 1889, take up their powers. The County of Edinburgh formally adopts the title Midlothian; the formerly administratively separate counties of Ross and Cromarty are merged; former enclaves of Moray in Inverness-shire and vice versa are absorbed into the surrounding counties; and the Shetland county council formally adopts the spelling Zetland.
- Tunnock's bakers established in Uddingston.
- Construction of the village of Fortingall on Sir Donald Currie's Glenlyon Estate in Perthshire begins to "Arts and Crafts" vernacular designs by James MacLaren (died 20 October).
- East End Exhibition opens in Glasgow and International Exhibition of Science, Art & Industry staged in Edinburgh.

== The arts ==
- William McGonagall's Poetic Gems published.

== Births ==
- 3 January – Willa Muir, born Wilhelmina Johnston Anderson, translator (died 1970)
- 30 January – Andy Cunningham, international footballer (died 1973)
- 10 September – Mortimer Wheeler, archaeologist (died 1976)
- Mary Newbery Sturrock, artist and designer (died 1955)

== Deaths ==
- 3 May – James B. Beck, United States Senator from Kentucky (1877–1890) (born 1822)
- 2 June – Sir George Burns, shipowner (born 1795)
- 25 June – Sir James Gowans, architect and building contractor (born 1821)
- 10 August – William Edward Baxter, businessman, travel writer and Liberal Member of Parliament for Montrose Burghs (1855–1885) (born 1825)
- 22 November – William Bell Scott, artist and poet (born 1811)

== See also ==
- Timeline of Scottish history
- 1890 in Ireland
