= 1899 in Scotland =

- Centuries: 17th; 18th; 19th; 20th; 21st
- Decades: 1870s; 1880s; 1890s; 1900s; 1910s
- See also: List of years in Scotland; Timeline of Scottish history 1899 in: The UK • Wales • Elsewhere; Scottish football: 1898–99 • 1899–1900

Events from the year 1899 in Scotland.

== Incumbents ==
- Secretary for Scotland and Keeper of the Great Seal – Lord Balfour of Burleigh

=== Law officers ===
- Lord Advocate – Andrew Murray
- Solicitor General for Scotland – Charles Dickson

=== Judiciary ===
- Lord President of the Court of Session and Lord Justice General – Lord Robertson to 21 November; then Lord Blair Balfour
- Lord Justice Clerk – Lord Kingsburgh

== Events ==
- March – supposed last duel in Scotland, fought with swords in the University of Glasgow over the appointment of a Rector, perhaps a student hoax.
- 13 March – Japanese battleship Asahi launched by John Brown & Company, Clydebank.
- 16 June – Penicuik House gutted by fire.
- July – Norman Heathcote climbs the St Kilda sea stack Stac Lee with his sister Evelyn.
- November – English occultist Aleister Crowley purchases Boleskine House near Foyers on the shore of Loch Ness from the Fraser family, occupying it until 1913.
- 7 December – Flannan Isles Lighthouse first lit.
- 15 December – Glasgow School of Art opens its new building, the most notable work of Charles Rennie Mackintosh.
- 30 December – the Albion Motor Car Company is set up in Glasgow; and the first Argyll car is also produced this year.
- George Campbell, 8th Duke of Argyll, presents Iona Abbey and other sacred sites of the island of Iona to the Iona Cathedral Trust (linked to the Church of Scotland).
- First Skerries Bridge, linking Bruray to Housay in the Out Skerries, is built.

== Births ==
- 24 June – Bruce Marshall, writer (died 1987 in France)
- 21 July – David Broadfoot, seaman awarded the George Cross for his role during the sinking of MV Princess Victoria (died 1959)
- 8 October – Dorothy Donaldson Buchanan, civil engineer (died 1985 in England)

== Deaths ==
- 6 June – Robert Wallace, classics teacher, minister, university professor, newspaper editor, barrister and Member of Parliament (born 1831)
- 14 September – William Watson, Baron Watson, former Lord Advocate (born 1827)

== See also ==
- Timeline of Scottish history
- 1899 in Ireland
