= 1894 in Scotland =

- Centuries: 17th; 18th; 19th; 20th; 21st
- Decades: 1870s; 1880s; 1890s; 1900s; 1910s
- See also: List of years in Scotland; Timeline of Scottish history 1894 in: The UK • Wales • Elsewhere; Scottish football: 1893–94 • 1894–95

Events from the year 1894 in Scotland.

== Incumbents ==
- Secretary for Scotland and Keeper of the Great Seal – Sir George Trevelyan, Bt

=== Law officers ===
- Lord Advocate – John Blair Balfour
- Solicitor General for Scotland – Alexander Asher; then Thomas Shaw

=== Judiciary ===
- Lord President of the Court of Session and Lord Justice General – Lord Robertson
- Lord Justice Clerk – Lord Kingsburgh

== Events ==
- 5 July – racing cutter Valkyrie II (1893) collides with Satanita on the Firth of Clyde and sinks, with one fatality.
- 11 July – rebuilt St Cuthbert's Church, Edinburgh, dedicated.
- July – Marion Gilchrist becomes the first woman to graduate from the University of Glasgow and the first woman to qualify in medicine from a Scottish university.
- 7 August – the West Highland Railway, operated by the North British Railway, is publicly opened to Fort William.
- 25 August – Local Government (Scotland) Act 1894 receives royal assent. Parochial boards replaced by elected parish councils.
- December – Longmorn distillery begins production.
- Lady Victoria Colliery comes into production at Newtongrange, Midlothian.
- McVitie's biscuit factory in Edinburgh is burned down but rebuilt.
- Elsie Inglis sets up a medical practice in Edinburgh.
- Craigholme School founded by Mrs Jessie Murdoch as Pollokshields Ladies' School.
- Alyth golf course laid out by Old Tom Morris.
- Marion Adams-Acton publishes Adventures of a perambulator: true details of a family history.

== Births ==
- 26 March – Alexander Thom, aerodynamicist and archaeoastronomer (died 1985)
- 13 May – Joe Corrie, miner, poet and playwright (died 1968)
- 28 June – Allardyce Nicoll, literary scholar (died 1976 in England)
- 29 June – David Steele, international footballer and manager (died 1964)
- 14 October – Victoria Drummond, marine engineer (died 1978 in England)
- Jimmy MacBeath, folk singer (died 1972)
- R. M. Smyllie, journalist (died 1954 in Ireland)

== Deaths ==
- 3 September – John Veitch, poet, philosopher and historian (born 1829)
- 3 December – Robert Louis Stevenson, novelist, poet, essayist and travel writer (born 1850; dies on Samoa)
- Alexander Henry, gun maker and rifle volunteer (born 1818)

== The arts ==
- Ian Maclaren's stories Beside the Bonnie Brier Bush are published.
- Robert Fuller Murray (born 1863 in the United States) dies; Robert F. Murray: His Poems with a Memoir is published posthumously edited by Andrew Lang.

== See also ==
- Timeline of Scottish history
- 1894 in Ireland
