= 1893 in Scotland =

- Centuries: 17th; 18th; 19th; 20th; 21st
- Decades: 1870s; 1880s; 1890s; 1900s; 1910s
- See also: List of years in Scotland; Timeline of Scottish history 1893 in: The UK • Wales • Elsewhere; Scottish football: 1892–93 • 1893–94

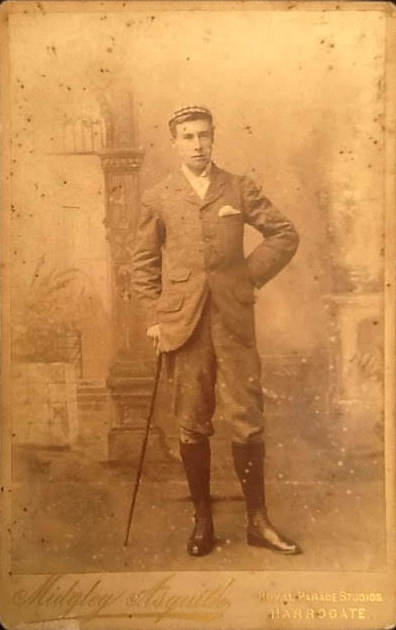
Windsor Dudley Cecil Hambrough

Events from the year 1893 in Scotland.

== Incumbents ==
- Secretary for Scotland and Keeper of the Great Seal – Sir George Trevelyan, Bt

=== Law officers ===
- Lord Advocate – John Blair Balfour
- Solicitor General for Scotland – Alexander Asher

=== Judiciary ===
- Lord President of the Court of Session and Lord Justice General – Lord Robertson
- Lord Justice Clerk – Lord Kingsburgh

== Events ==
- 20 April – gaff rigged racing cutter yacht HMY Britannia, designed by George Lennox Watson for Albert Edward, Prince of Wales, is launched at D. and W. Henderson and Company's Meadowside shipyard at Partick on the River Clyde.
- 29 April – gaff rigged racing cutter yacht Valkyrie II, designed by George Lennox Watson for Lord Dunraven to challenge the America's Cup, is launched at D. and W. Henderson and Company's Meadowside shipyard at Partick on the River Clyde.
- 6 July – replacement Bonar Bridge opened.
- 12 July – Dundee football club formed.
- 10 August –
  - Elgin City F.C. formed.
  - Ardlamont murder in Argyll.
- 7 September – first Aberdeen Synagogue consecrated.
- Drambuie is registered as a trademark for a whisky-based liqueur by James Ross of Broadford, Skye.

== Births ==
- 11 February – Nan Shepherd, novelist and poet (died 1981)
- 1 March – Andrew Bryan, mining engineer (died 1988)
- 10 April – James Hutchison, shipbuilder, army officer and politician (died 1979)
- 24 April – Alan Morton, international footballer (died 1971)
- 30 June – Herbert James Gunn, painter (died 1964)

== Deaths ==
- 13 February – George Lichtenstein, pianist and music teacher (born 1827 in Hungary)
- 15 February – Henry MacDonald, soldier, Victoria Cross recipient (born 1823)
- 21 February – John Pettie, painter (born 1839)
- 29 March – John Bartholomew, cartographer (born 1831)
- 22 June – Sir William Mackinnon, 1st Baronet, shipowner (born 1823)
- 10 October – Charles Altamont Doyle, artist (born 1832 in England)
- 11 December – William Milligan, theologian (born 1821)

== The arts ==
- 4 September – Beatrix Potter, staying with her family at a house near Dunkeld leased from a Mr McGregor, writes the letter that will become The Tale of Peter Rabbit.
- S. R. Crockett publishes his story "The Stickit Minister".
- William Sharp publishes Pharais, his first novel under the pseudonym Fiona MacLeod.

== See also ==
- Timeline of Scottish history
- 1893 in Ireland
