= Flora Woodman =

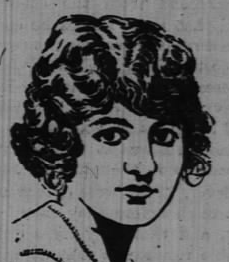
- Flora Woodman, from a 1919 advertisement.
- Born: 1896
- Died: 1981 (aged 84–85)
- Occupation: Singer

Flora Woodman (1896 – 1981) was a Scottish soprano singer popular for her London concert performances in the first decades of the twentieth century. She extensively performed in oratorios such as The Messiah and Elijah.

== Career ==
Woodman sang at the Hallé in 1915. In 1920 she was featured soloist for the Hamilton Choral Society, and "challenged criticism" at a Queen's Hall concert. In 1923 she arranged "The Vesper Hymn" by Thomas Moore, for her own performances.

Woodman sang The Messiah at the Three Choirs Festival in 1925, and with the Scottish Orchestra in 1927, but it was her performance of the Mad Scene from Lucia di Lammermoor that brought her favorable reviews. She was a soloist at the Norfolk and Norwich Triennial Music Festivals of 1927 and 1930. She toured the United States and Canada in 1929 and 1930, and sang with the St. Louis Symphony Orchestra during that tour.

She recorded for The Gramophone Company. She was reviewed as having a "light" voice, a "beaming smile" and "passably in tune" but having a limited range. "She has also a very unfortunate habit of beginning to sing a note before quite deciding on its pitch," according to a Boston Globe reviewer.

Her career was stalled in 1931, when complications following an appendectomy forced her to cancel engagements.
