= Maria Rickmers =

Missing barque

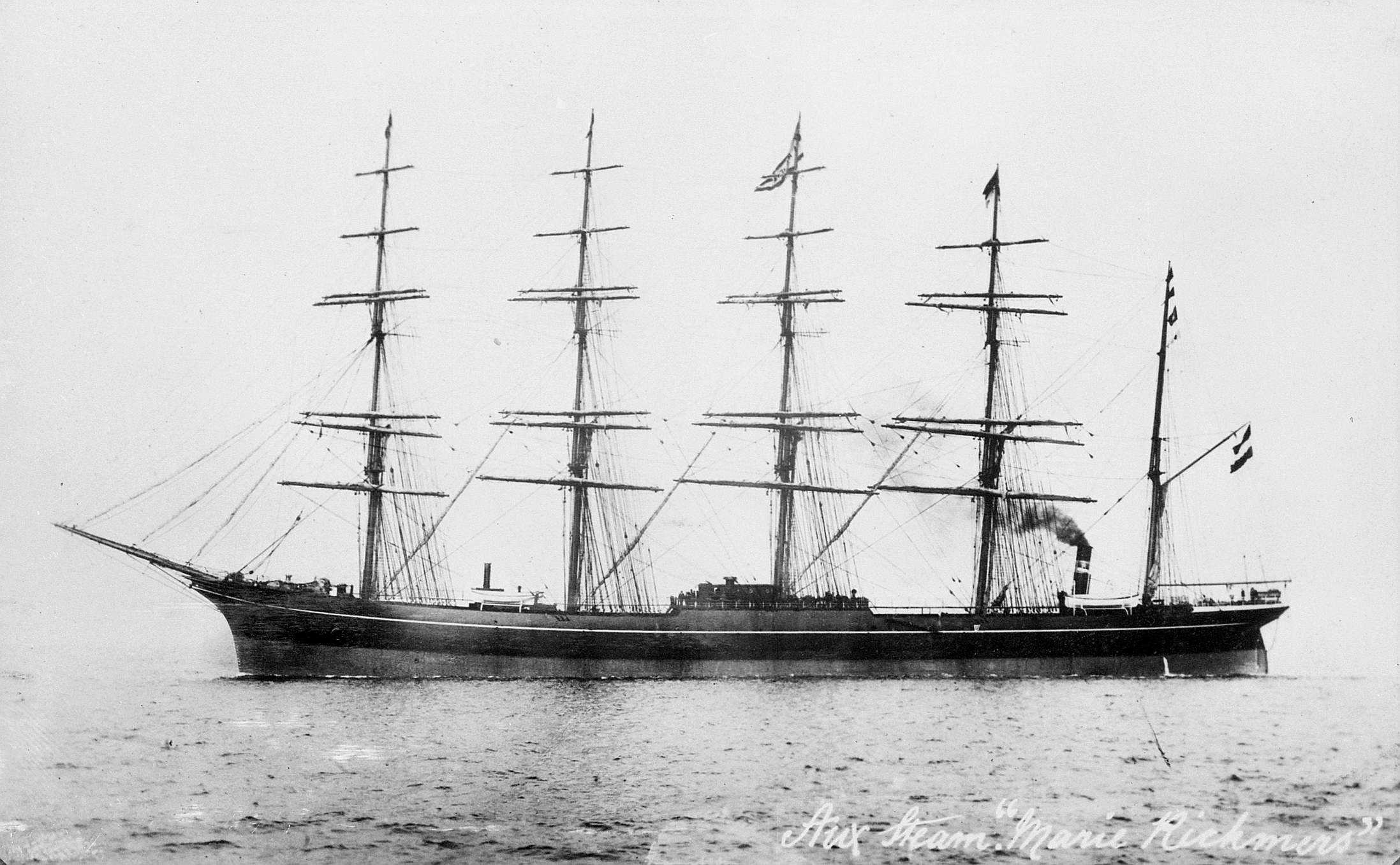
- Abeam view of Maria Rickmers in 1892

History

German Empire
- Name: Maria Rickmers
- Owner: Rickmers
- Route: East Asia to Bremen
- Builder: John Scott Russell, Glasgow
- Launched: 18 December 1891
- Completed: March 1892

General characteristics
- Tonnage: 3,822 GRT
- Length: 114 m (375 ft)
- Beam: 15 m (48 ft)
- Draft: 7.6 m (25 ft)
- Installed power: 750 hp (560 kW)
- Propulsion: 1 × steam engine; 1 × propeller
- Sail plan: Barque
- Complement: 40

Maria Rickmers was a five-masted barque, one of the few such vessels. She was launched in 1891 to carry rice between South-East Asia and Germany and sailed on her maiden voyage in 1892. The ship was unstable, and she was last seen while sailing back to Germany. Her last confirmed sighting was off Java that July, although a vessel matching the barque's unique description was spotted off the Azores in November, and a message in a bottle was found in 1894 in Scotland which claimed that the ship sank in December 1892.

== Design and construction ==
During the 1890s, the proliferation of steamships reduced profits produced by sailing ships. In response, several companies ordered large five-masted barques that could carry immense amounts of cargo with fewer crew and lower costs. One company was the German firm Rickmers Reismühlen, which ordered such a ship to carry rice from Burma to the company's mills in Bremen. The ship, named Maria Rickmers after the wife of one of the company's owners, had a length of 114 metres (375 ft), beam of 15 metres (48 ft), draught of 7.6 metres (25 ft), a tonnage of 3,822 GRT, and a complement of 40. She was equipped with a double bottom and a 560 kilowatts (750 hp) triple expansion engine that turned a double bladed feathering propeller, which could produce 7 knots (13 km/h; 8.1 mph) in calm weather. Her five masts carried 5,300 square metres (57,000 ft^{2}) of sail.

Maria Rickmers was built by John Russell's shipyard in Glasgow, launched on 18 December 1891, and completed in March 1892. When launched, she was the largest sailing ship built in the United Kingdom and one of the largest sailing ships in the world. The ship was the second five-masted barque ever built, after the nitrate-carrying France I. The design rapidly lost popularity as the ships were not economically successful.

== Voyage ==
The first leg of her maiden voyage, with a load of coal from the United Kingdom to Singapore, took 82 days. Several of the early five-masted barques were unstable, a characteristic exacerbated when fully loaded. The voyage was difficult as the ship was unstable, hard to control, cumbersome, and slow. Rickmers was unsatisfied, and sent a harsh message to the ship's captain, blaming him for the issues. The captain died soon after, which left the ship under the command of the chief mate. Maria Rickmers then travelled to Saigon to load rice before sailing to Bremen. Her last confirmed sighting was on 24 July 1892, off the coast of Anjer on Java.

The captain of Antioco Accame stated he spotted a five-masted ship with a funnel while sailing 300 nautical miles (560 km; 350 mi) west of the Azores on 11 November. Another crew member objected to the description and stated he passed a five-masted ship on 8 October while 400 nautical miles (740 km; 460 mi) off Cape Verde. In 1894, a tin box was found near Greenock that bore the ship's name. Inside was a note that claimed the ship was sinking on 12 December 1892. William Fairburn theorized that the ship's new captain felt pressured by the company to sail as fast as possible on the return trip, which led the unstable vessel to capsize, killing the entire crew.
