= Jenners =

Former department store in Edinburgh, Scotland

Coordinates: 55°57′10″N 3°11′39″W

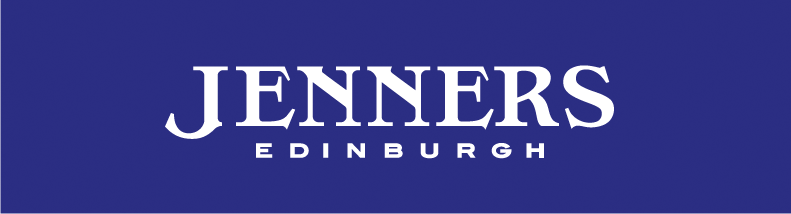

- Industry: Retail
- Founded: 1838
- Defunct: 2020
- Fate: Defunct; Edinburgh location closed; Loch Lomond Shores location rebranded as Frasers
- Area served: Scotland
- Parent: Frasers Group

Listed Building – Category A
- Official name: 47-52 (Inclusive Nos) Princes Street And South St David Street, Jenners Department Store, Including Gothic Streetlight
- Designated: 14 December 1970
- Reference no.: LB29505

Jenners was a department store in Edinburgh, Scotland, situated on Princes Street. It was Scotland's oldest independent department store until the retail business was acquired by House of Fraser in 2005. It closed in December 2020 and was vacated by House of Fraser in May 2021. The building is currently undergoing restoration to be repurposed as a hotel.

== History ==
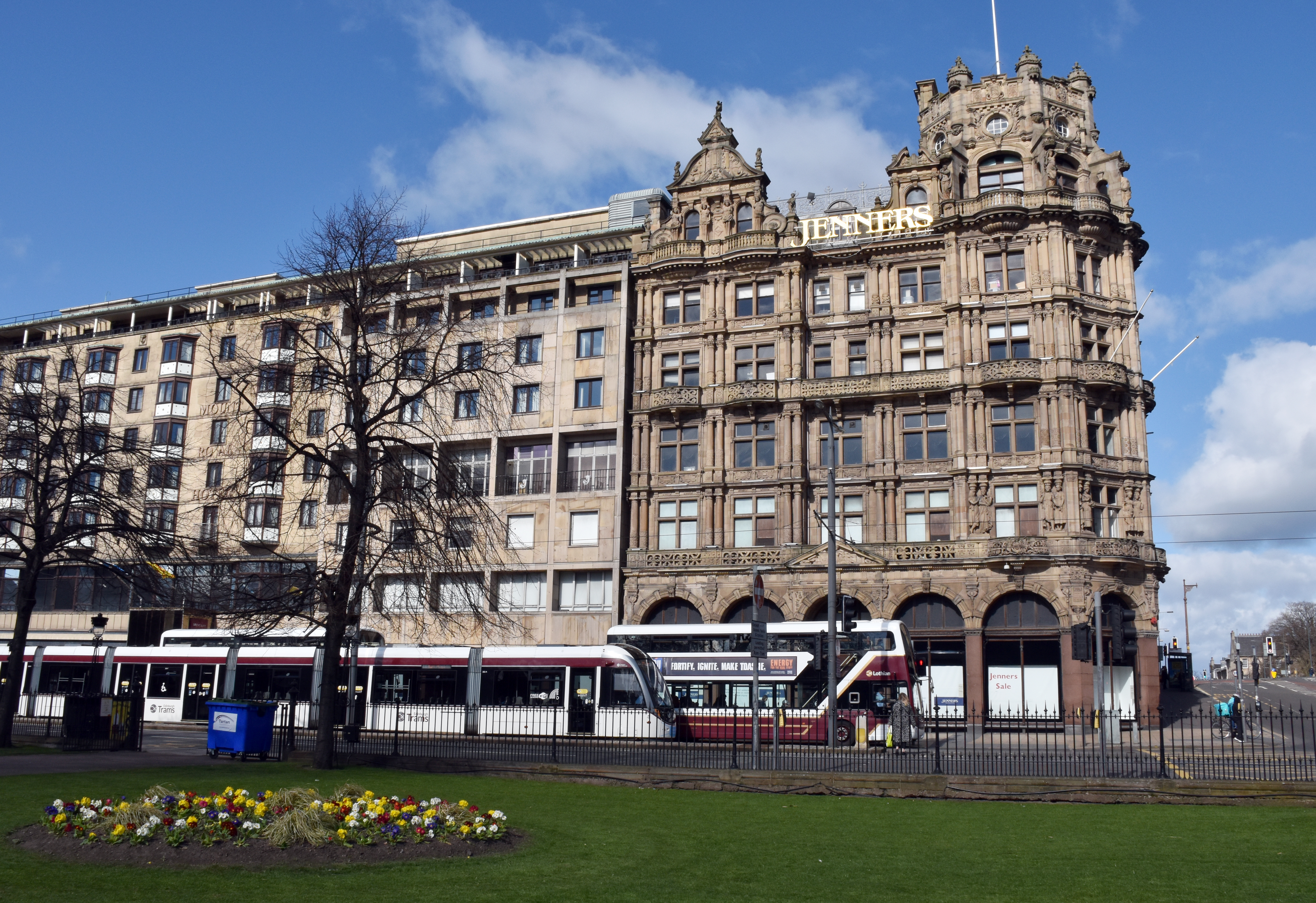
Jenners department store, Princes Street, Edinburgh, viewed from the gardens opposite (March 2021).

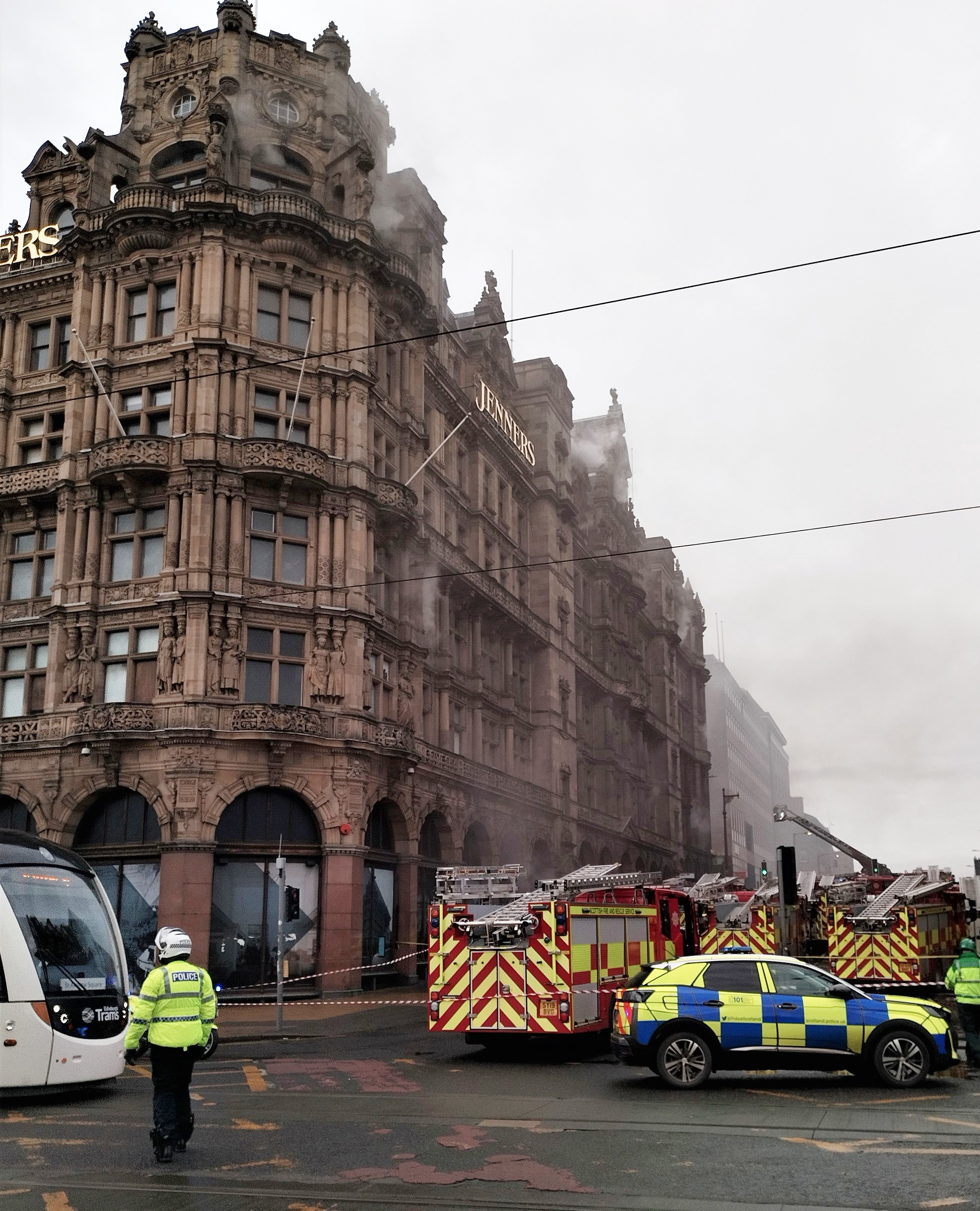
Jenners former department store on fire 23 January 2023

Jenners was founded as "Kennington & Jenner" in 1838 by Charles Jenner FRSE (1810–1893), a linen draper, and Charles Kennington. The store has never left its site on Princes Street, but its original building was destroyed by fire in 1892. In 1893 the Scottish architect William Hamilton Beattie was appointed to design a replacement, which subsequently opened in 1895. It is now a category A listed building.

Jenners was run for many years by the Douglas Miller family, descendants of James Kennedy, who took charge of the store after Charles Jenner retired in 1881. Known as the "Harrods of the North", it has held a Royal Warrant since 1911, and was visited by Queen Elizabeth II on the occasion of its 150th anniversary in 1988.

=== Sale to House of Fraser ===
On 16 March 2005 it was announced that the Douglas Miller family were in advanced negotiations to sell the business to the House of Fraser, at an estimated price of £100–200 million, but a month later it was sold for £46.1 million. While other acquisitions by House of Fraser had been renamed, Jenners kept its identity. The store made national news in 2007 when it publicly announced that it would stop selling paté de foie gras, following a boycott by the Duke and Duchess of Hamilton. In 2008, House of Fraser invested £3 million in improvements to the store. As a result of this, in 2016 the basement toy department was rebranded under the Hamleys name, before being closed in 2019.

The lease of the building remained with the Jenners holding company JPSE Ltd, owned by the Douglas Miller family. In August 2005 it was sold to Moorcroft Capital Management, owned by Jenners' former chief executive Robbie Douglas Miller. In 2017 the building was bought by Danish billionaire fashion retailer and landowner in Scotland Anders Holch Povlsen, reportedly for £53 million.

In late 2019 it was reported that the business was considering reducing its size or moving from Princes Street.

=== Department store closure ===
In January 2021, it was announced that Jenners was closing and 200 jobs would be lost. The Jenners signage was removed from the Princes Street building on 14 April 2021, reportedly to the surprise of the owners of the building. Edinburgh City Council issued a Listed Building enforcement notice on 21 April 2021 to Sports Direct Retail, the Mike Ashley company that owns the Frasers Group, to reinstate the Jenners letters on the eastern and southern sides of the department store, as these had been removed without listed building consent. In May 2021, it was announced that the restoration of the building will take four years, and that the store was planned to reopen without the House of Fraser livery once redevelopment had completed.

=== Proposed hotel conversion ===
In June 2022, AAA United, the company owned by Anders Holch Povlsen, was granted planning permission to convert the building to a 96-room hotel. Under the plans by David Chipperfield Architects, the three-storey central atrium would be retained, as would the Jenners signage. The hotel rooms would occupy the upper floors, with new retail use, restaurants and cafés at the lower levels, and a new roof-top bar. By 2025, the building had been stripped of old electrical wiring and asbestos, and a three-year project to fit the new fixtures commenced, utilising a crane lowered through a hole in the roof to extract materials.

=== 2023 fire ===
On 23 January 2023, a fire broke out at the rear of the empty building. Five firefighters were injured, one of whom, 38-year old Barry Martin, was critically injured and died four days later. Eyewitnesses described smoke pouring out of the basement area of the department store.

== Architecture ==
The present Jenners building in Edinburgh was designed in 1893 by William Hamilton Beattie in an ornate, early Renaissance Revival style, embellished with a variety of columns, ornamental cornices and decorative balustrading. The building is situated on a slope, with six storeys and an attic level; on the south-east corner is a canted 7-storey tower. At Charles Jenner's insistence the building's facade was decorated with rows of female caryatids "to show symbolically that women are the support of the house". The new store featured many technical innovations such as electric lighting and hydraulic lifts, In 1903, the store was extended northwards towards Rose Street by Beattie's partner, Andrew Robb Scott, in a style matching Beattie's original design. A further extension was added to the west along Princes Street by Tarbolton & Ochterlony in 1955. The Jenners building is especially noted for its grand saloon hall, with consoled wooden galleries rising three storeys with an elaborate strapwork timber stair, and topped with a glass and queen-post timber roof. Each winter, a large Christmas tree erected in the grand hall became a popular annual visitor attraction.

The Jenners store was designated a category A listed building in 1970.

Architectural details

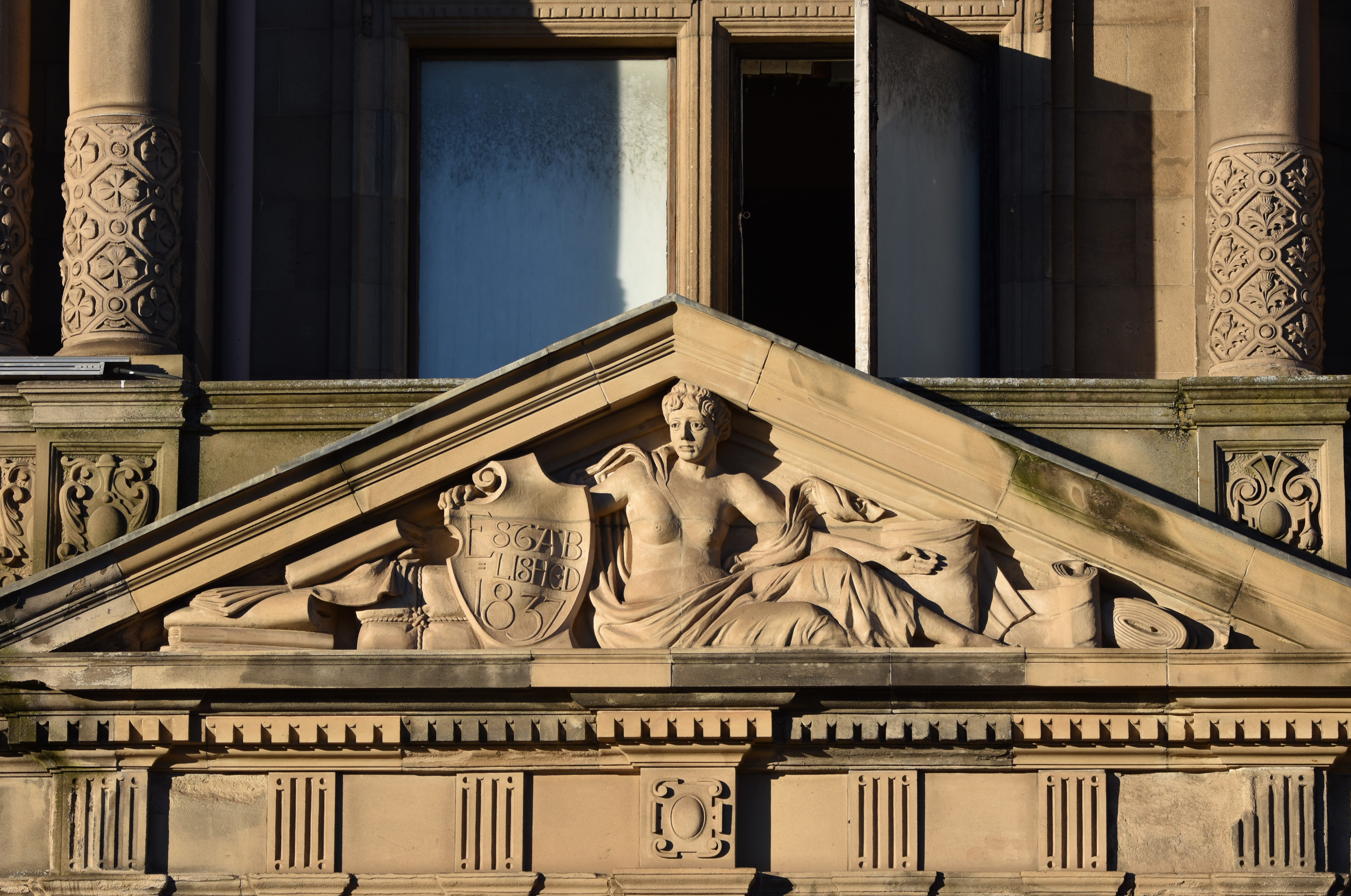
Classical female nude holding a shield with the date of the establishment of Jenners, door pediment, main entrance, Princes Street façade

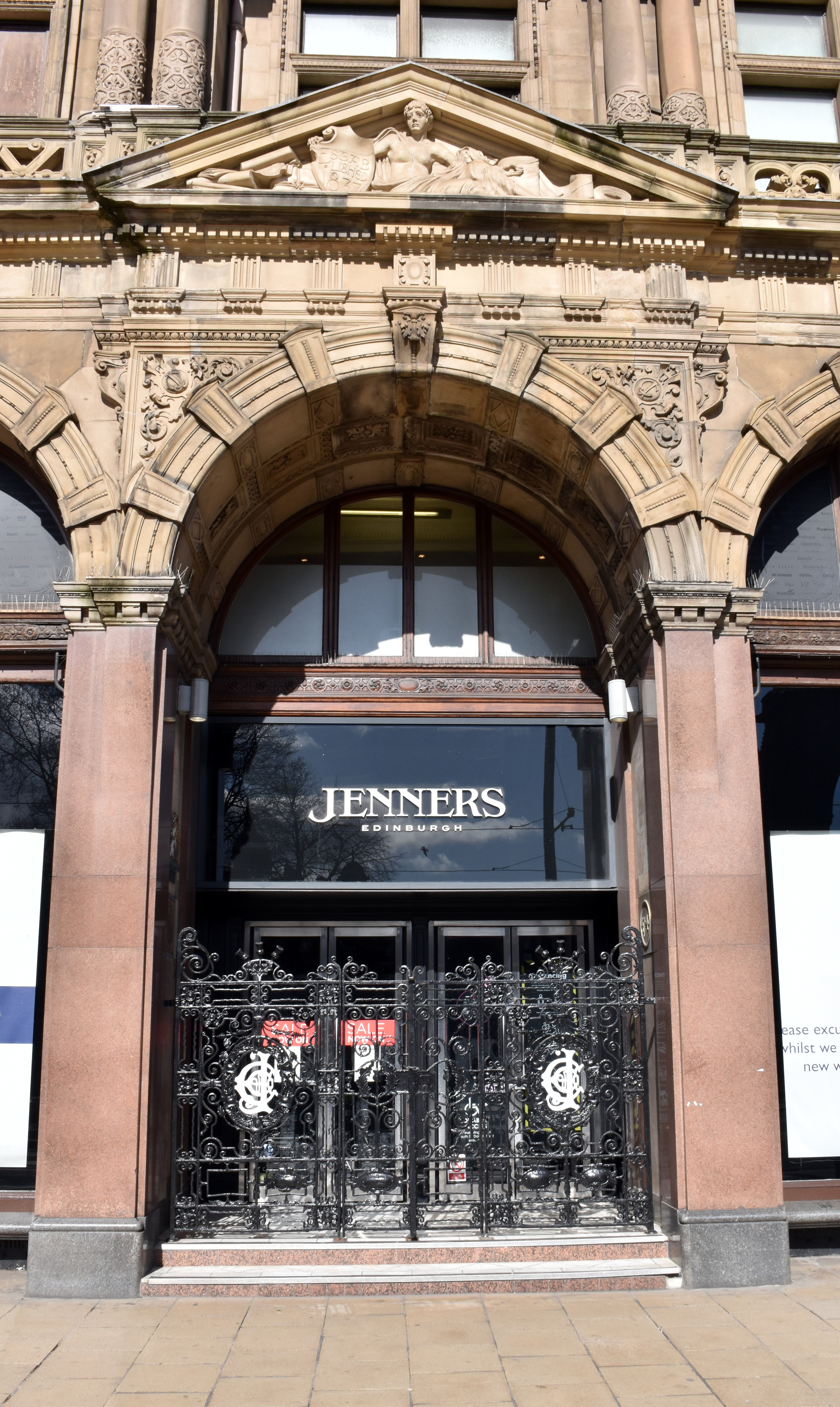
The main entrance in Princes Street

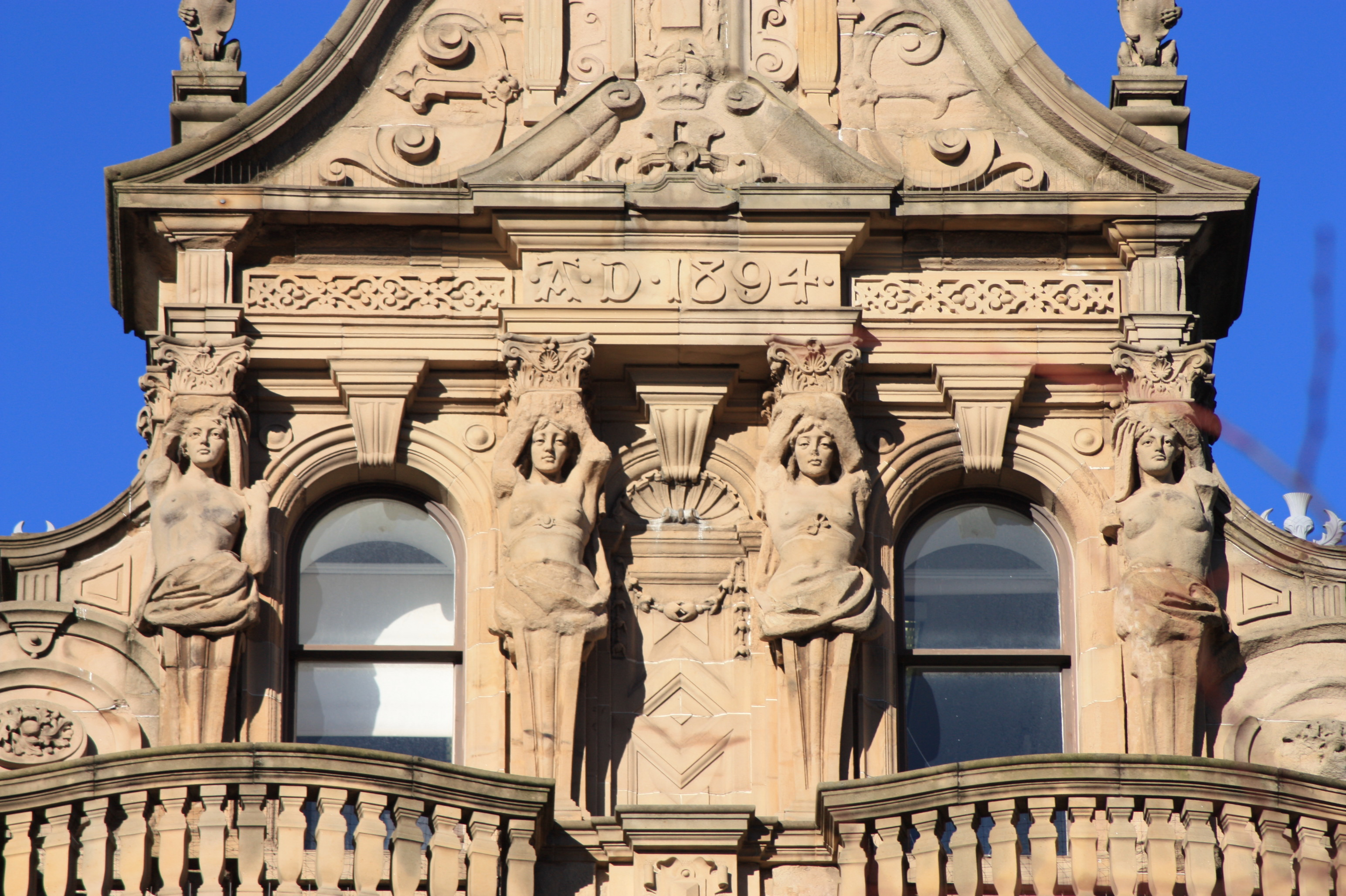
Caryatids on the store's rooftop

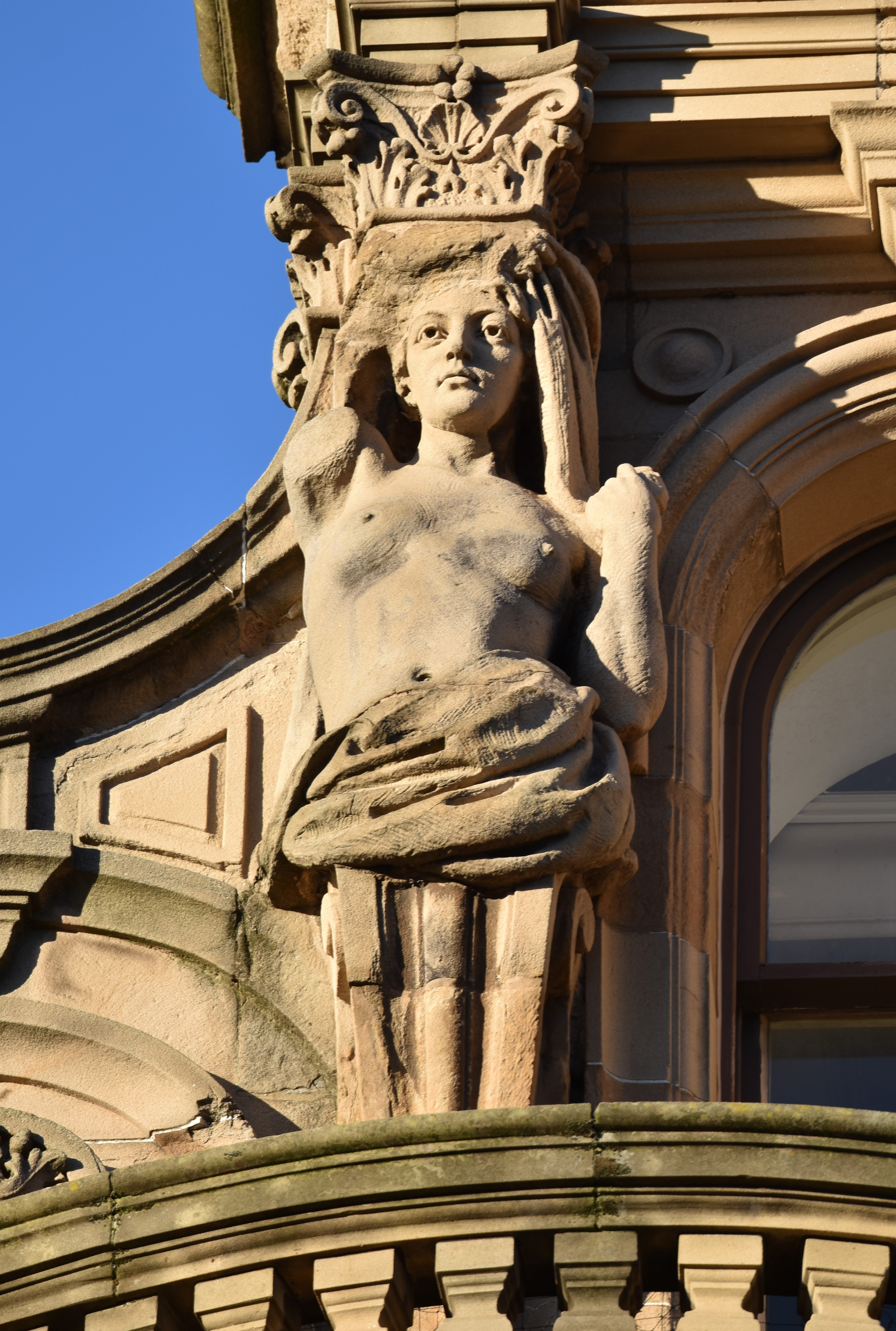
Caryatid (left), pediment over two left bays, Princes Street façade

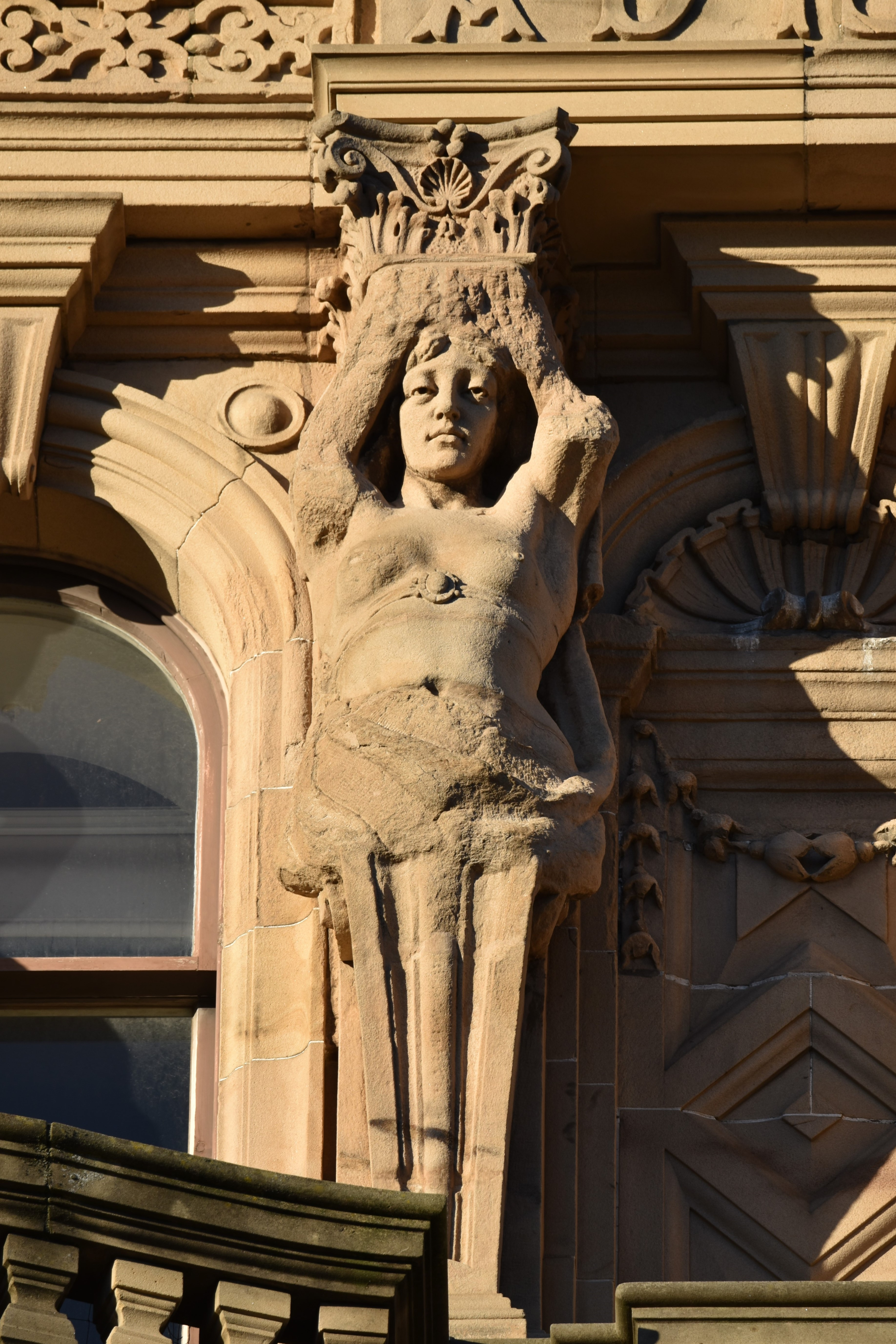
Caryatid (centre left), pediment over two left bays, Princes Street façade

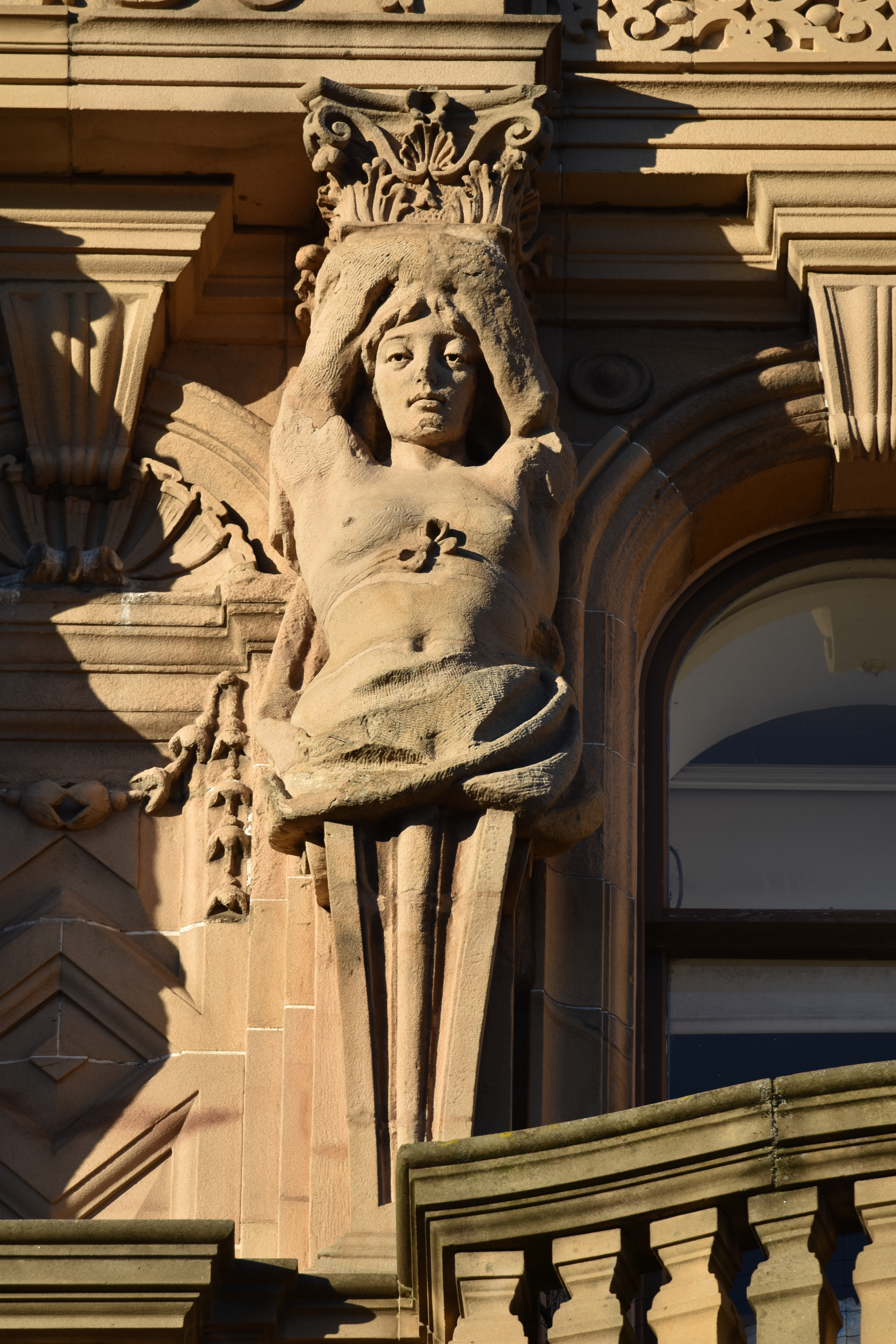
Caryatid (centre right), pediment over two left bays, Princes Street façade

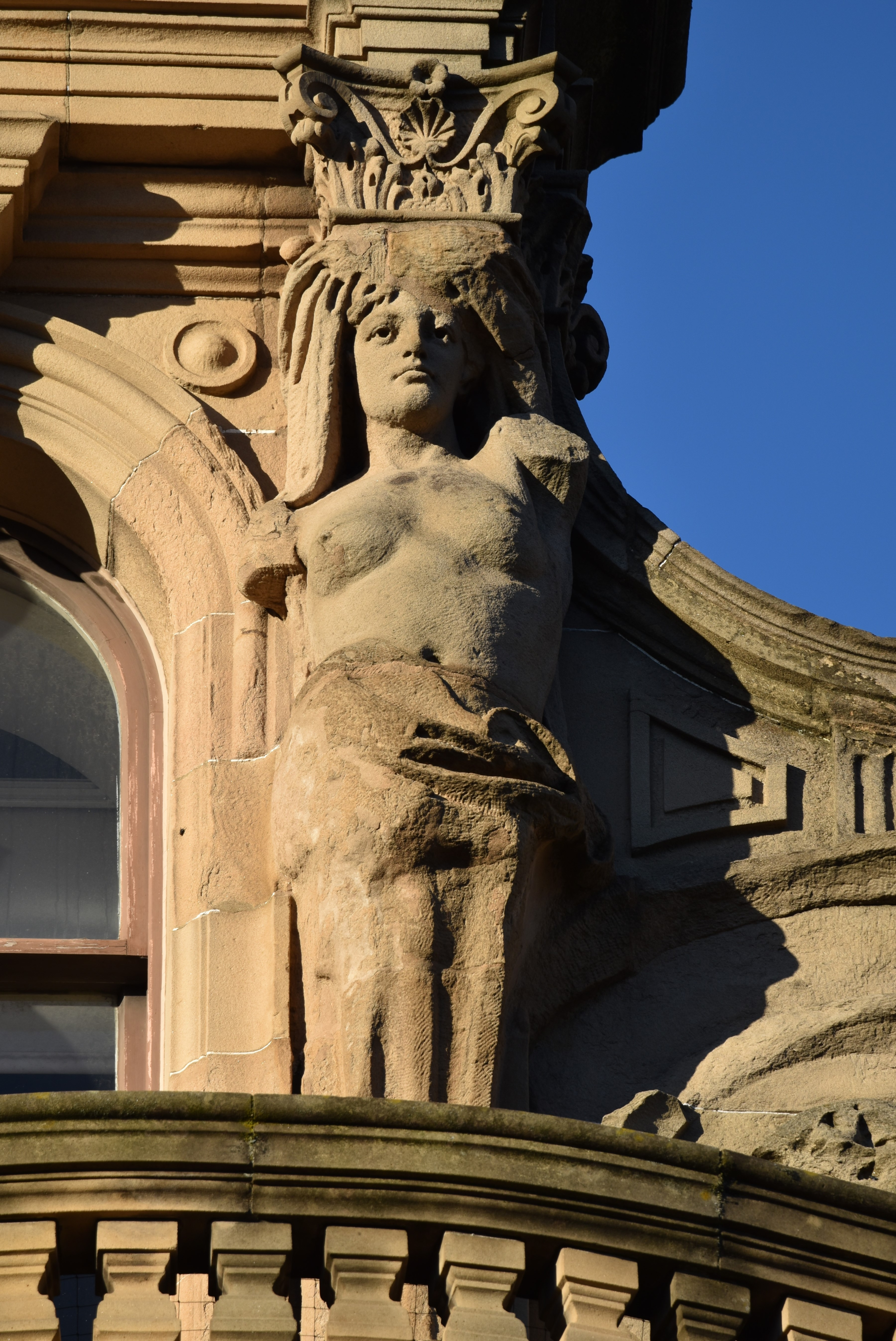
Caryatid (right), pediment over two left bays, Princes Street façade

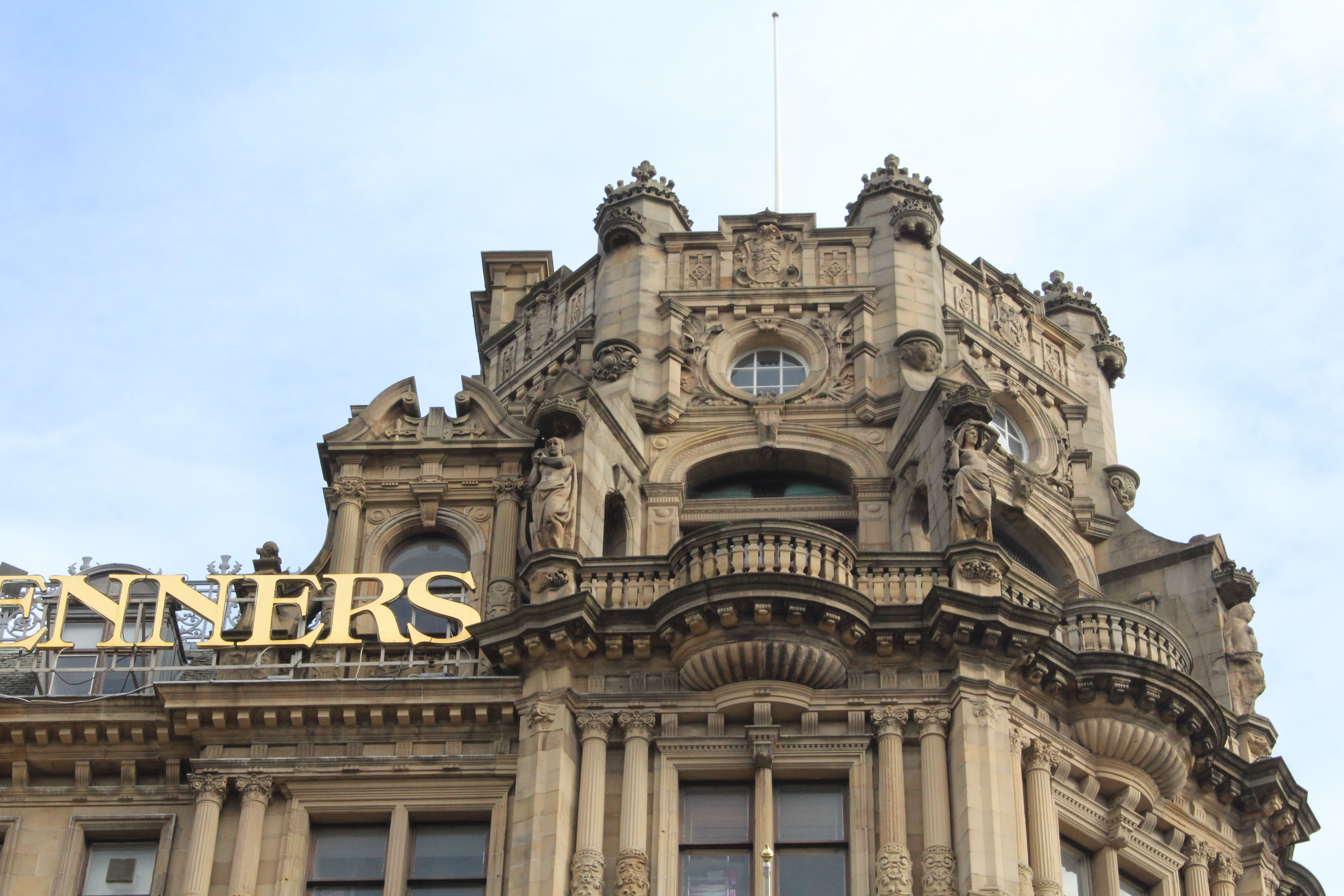
Detail of the corner tower

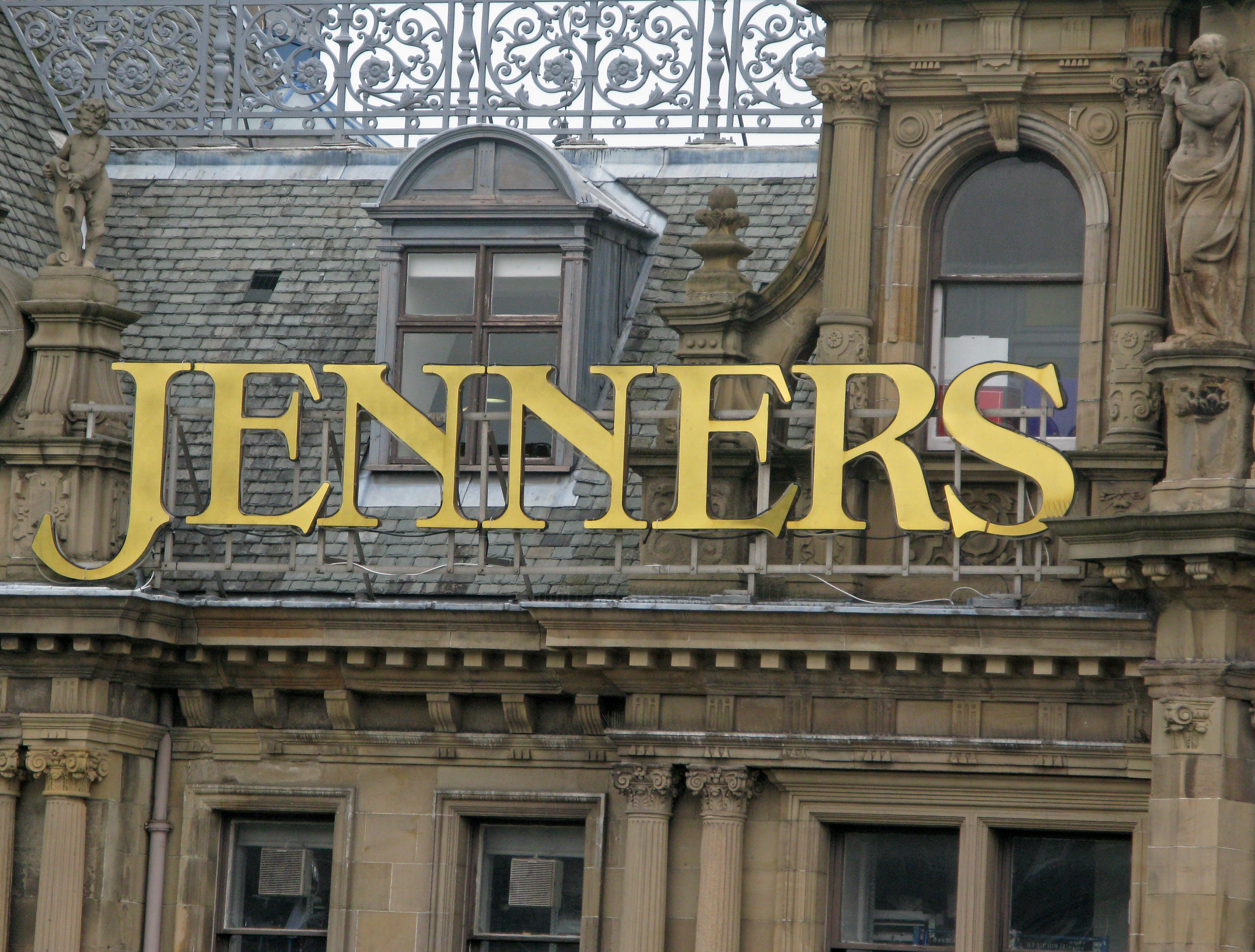
The famous Jenners signage

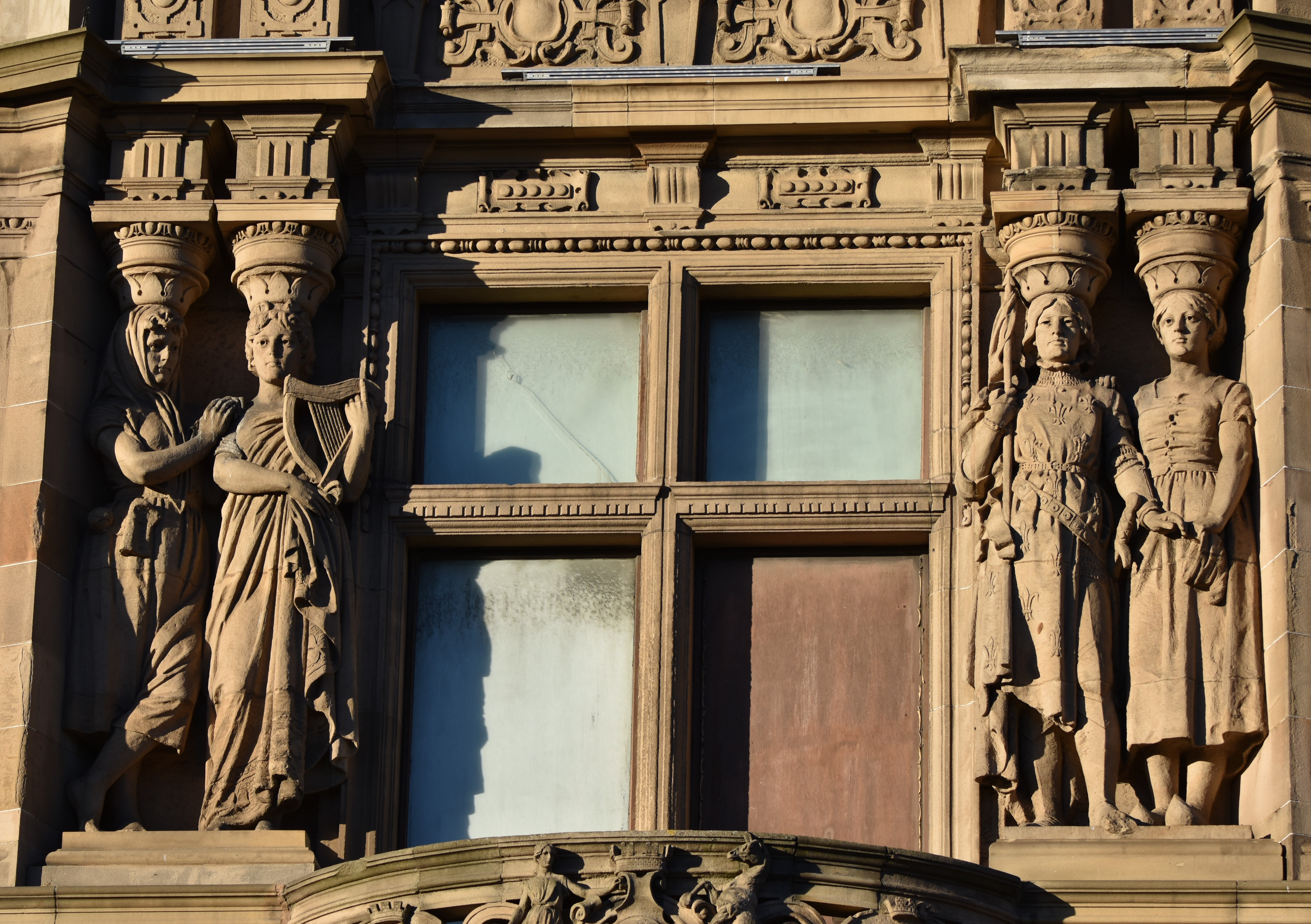
Two pairs of caryatids flanking first floor window, bay five, Princes Street façade

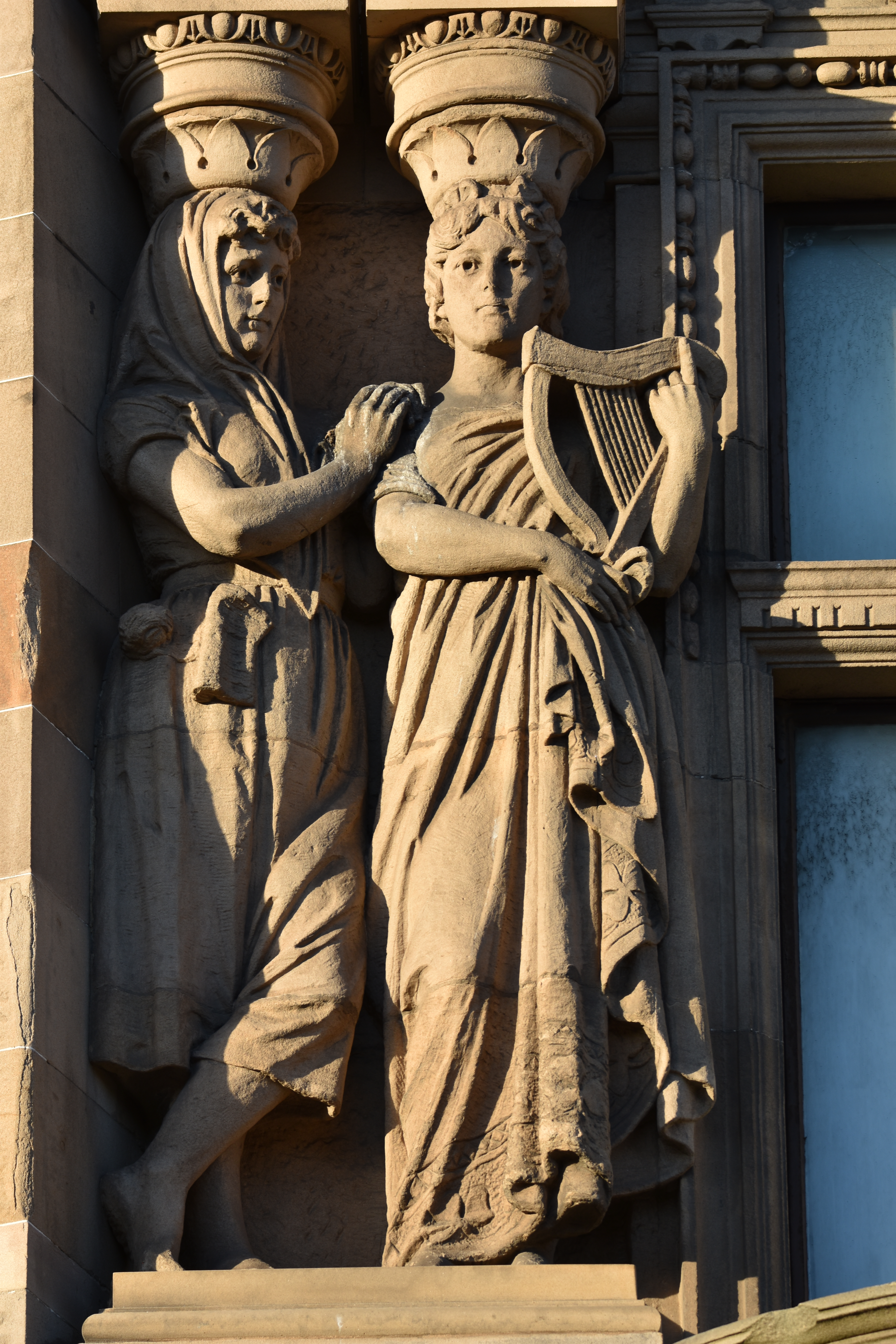
Left pair of caryatids, one, with harp, representing Ireland; first floor, bay five, Princes Street façade

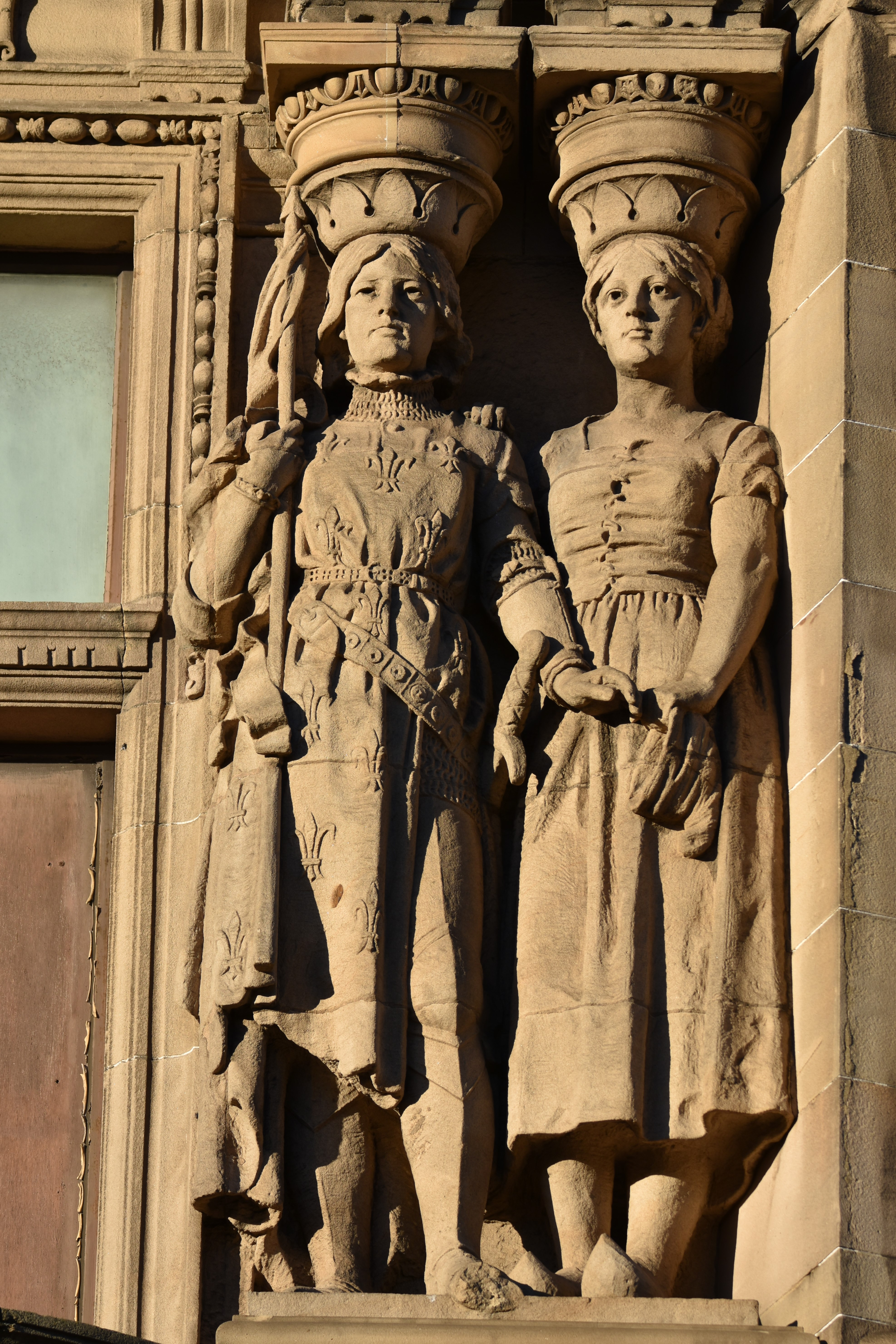
Right pair of caryatids, one in armour and tunic with fleur de lys, representing France (Joan of Arc), first floor, bay five, Princes Street façade

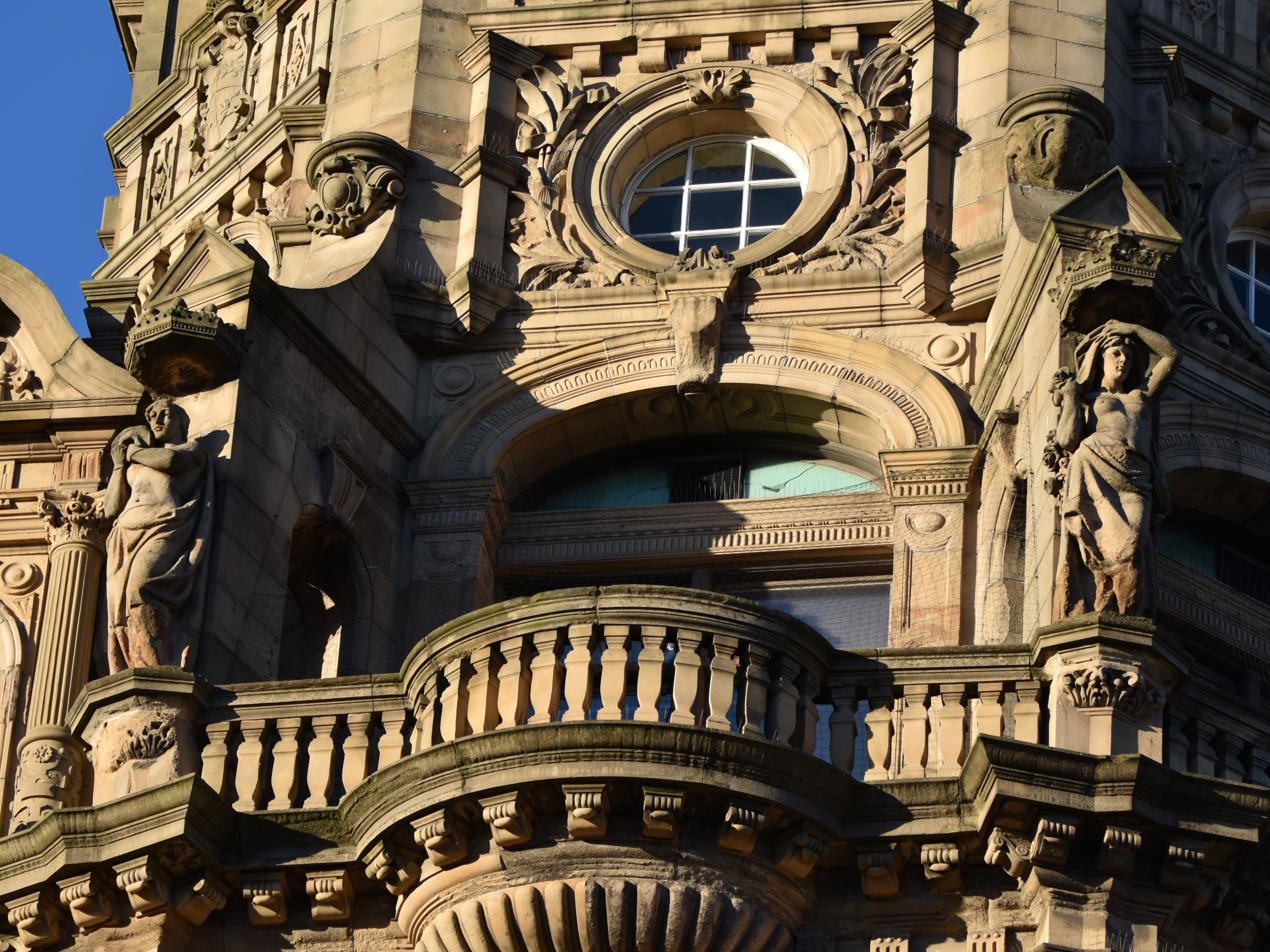
Pair of semi-nude female figures in niches flanking balustrade and window, floor 5, bay 5, Princes Street façade & Tower façade at corner of South St David Street

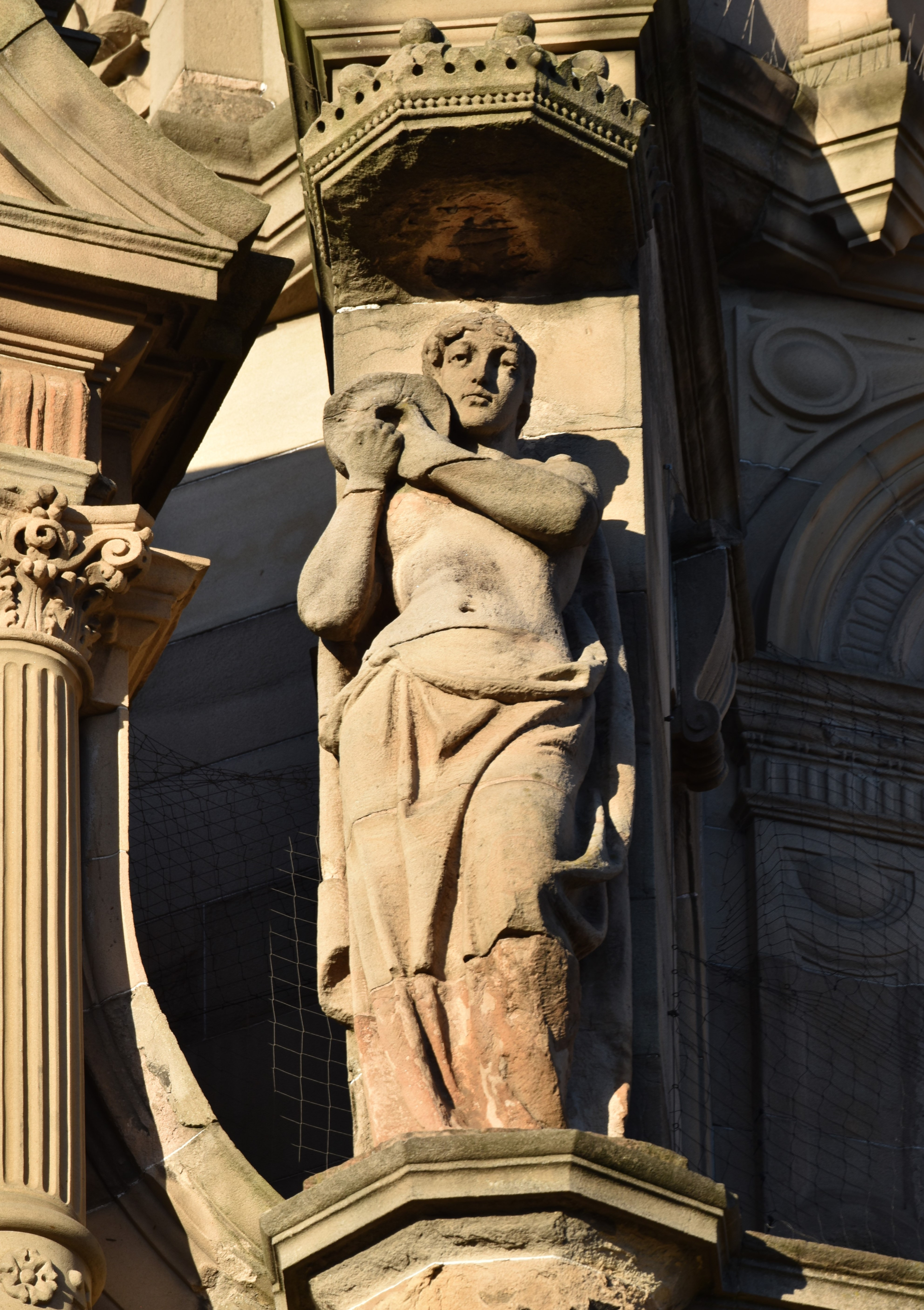
Semi-nude female figure holding an urn over her shoulder, floor 5, bay 5, Princes Street façade

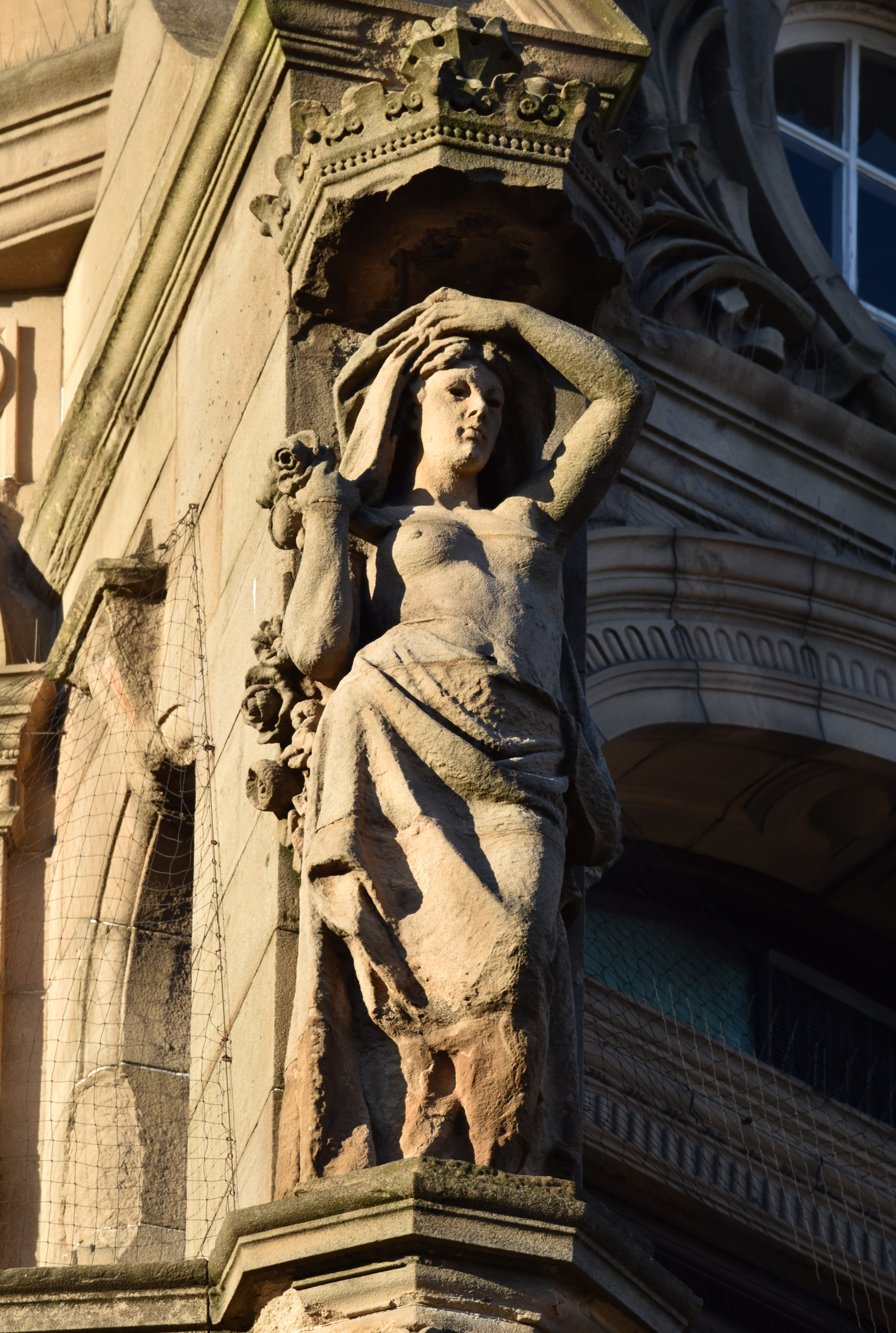
Semi-nude female figure holding roses over her shoulder, floor 5, Tower façade at corner of Princes Street and South St David Street

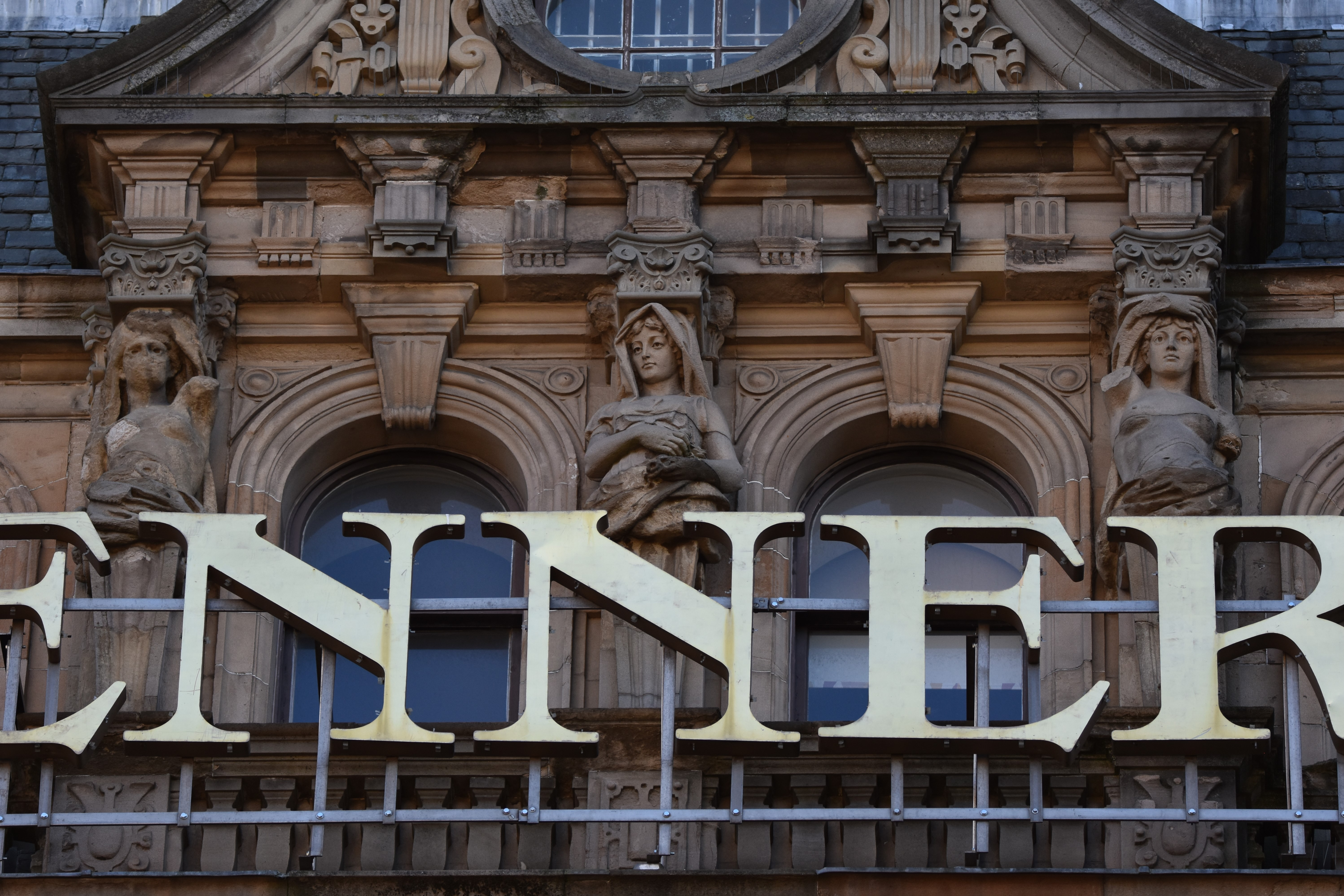
Three caryatids supporting pediment over Bay 4, South Saint David Street façade

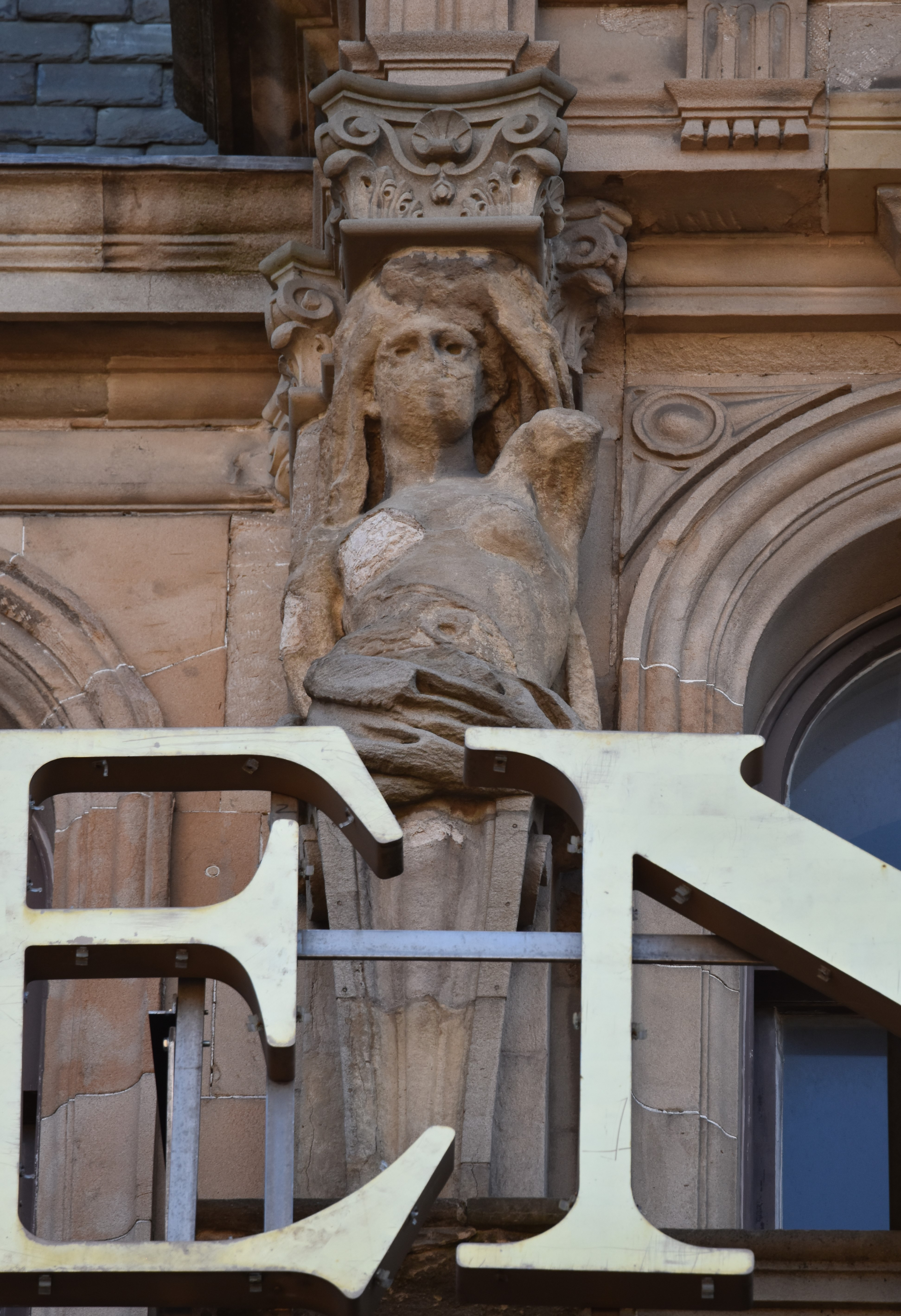
Caryatid (left), pediment over Bay 4, South Saint David Street façade

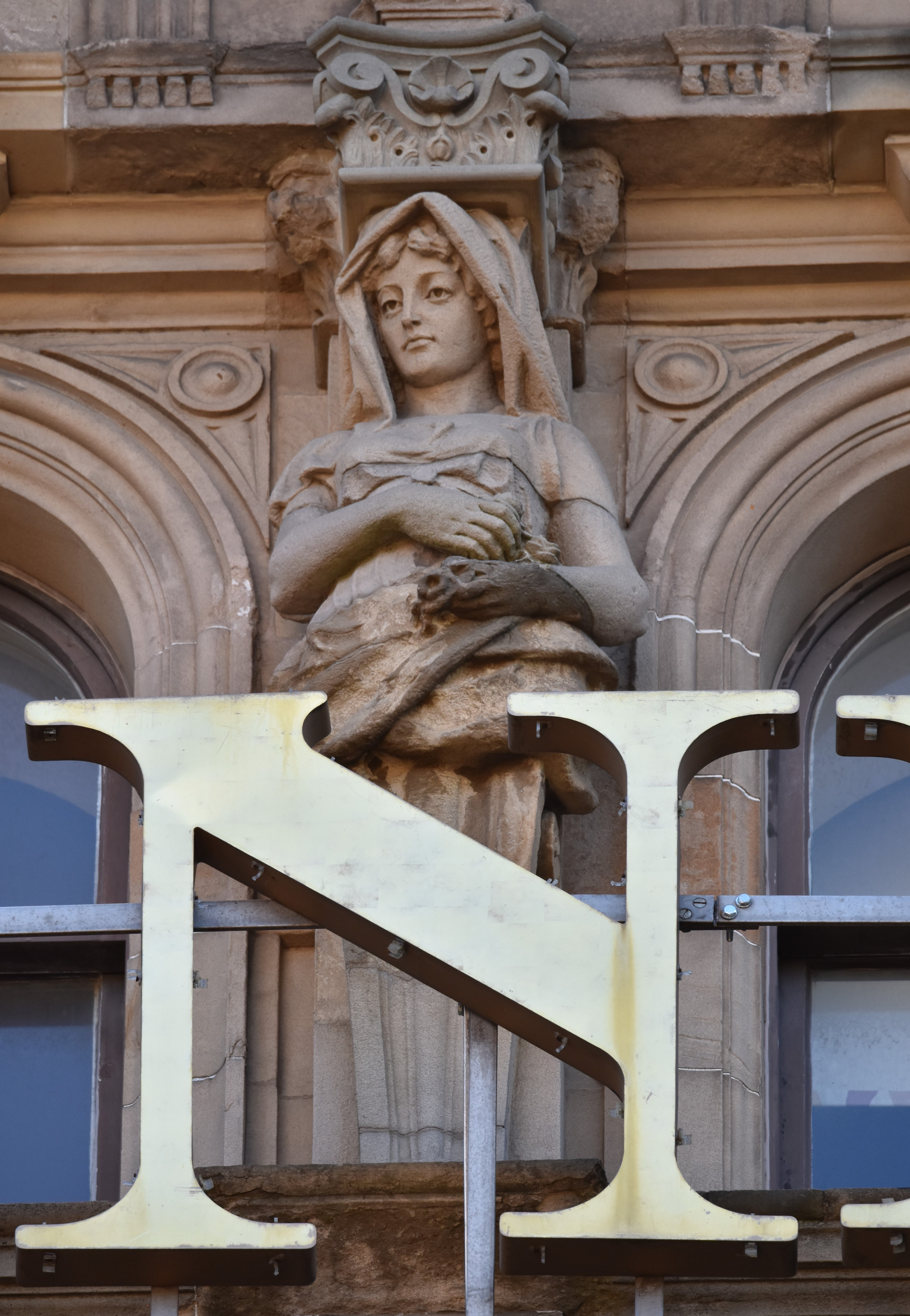
Caryatid (centre), pediment over Bay 4, South Saint David Street façade

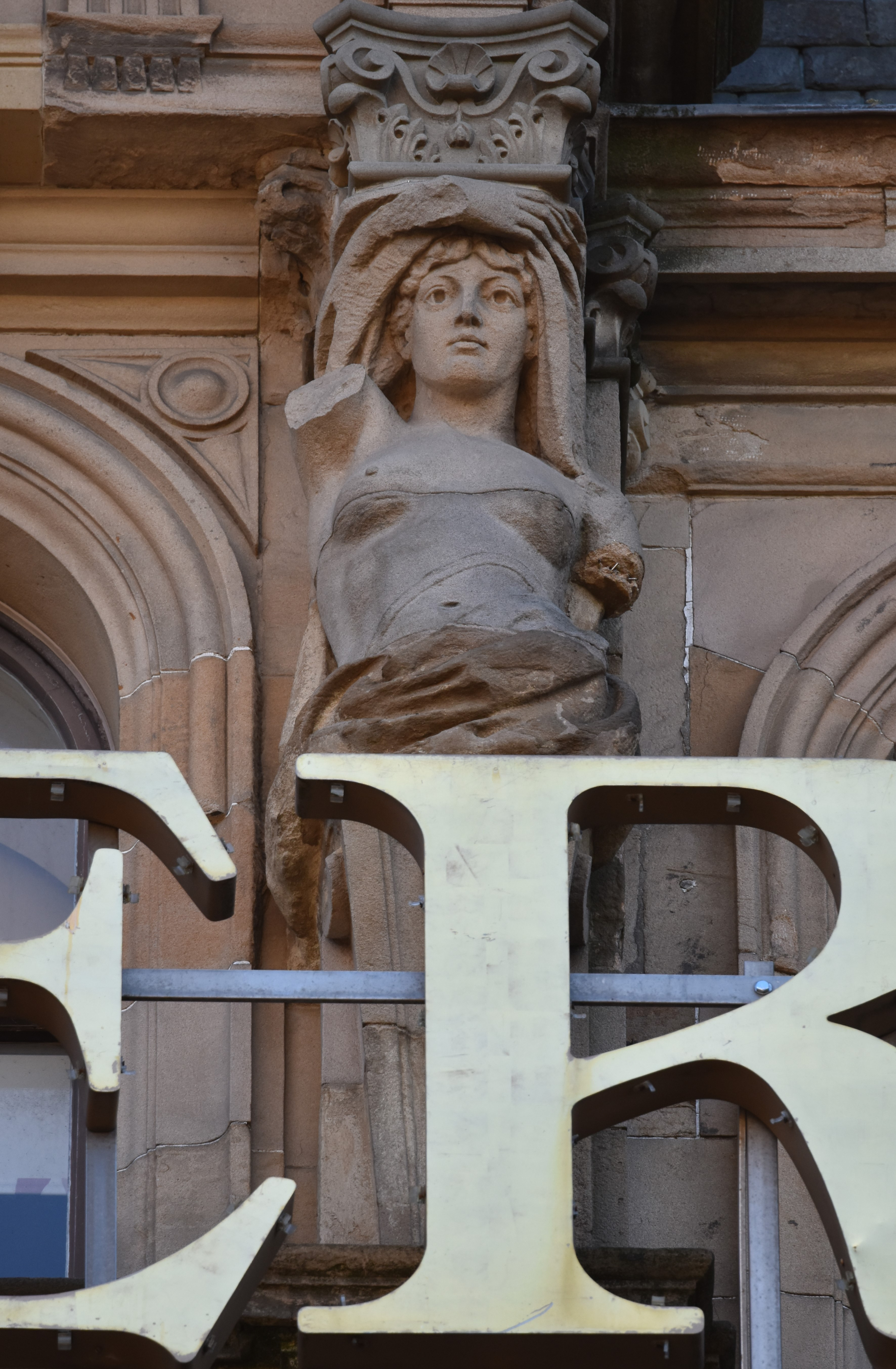
Caryatid (right), pediment over Bay 4, South Saint David Street façade

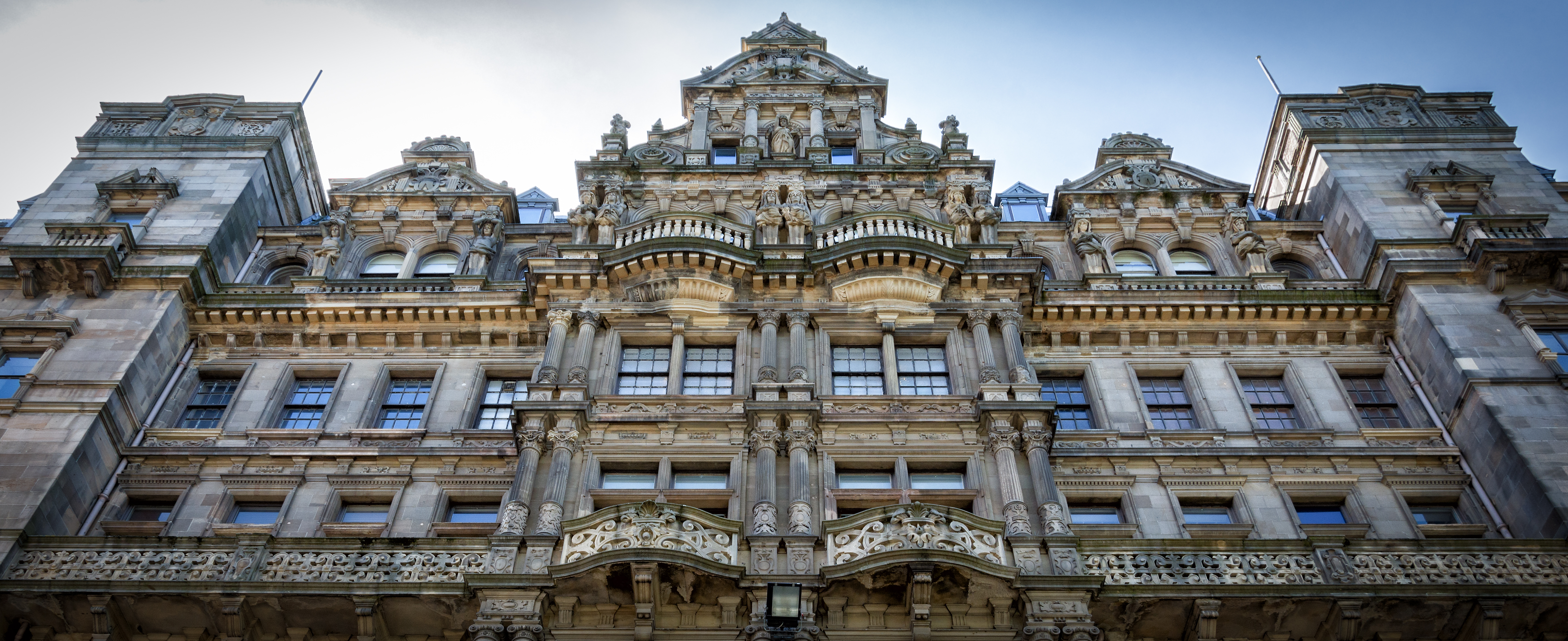
South Saint David Street facade

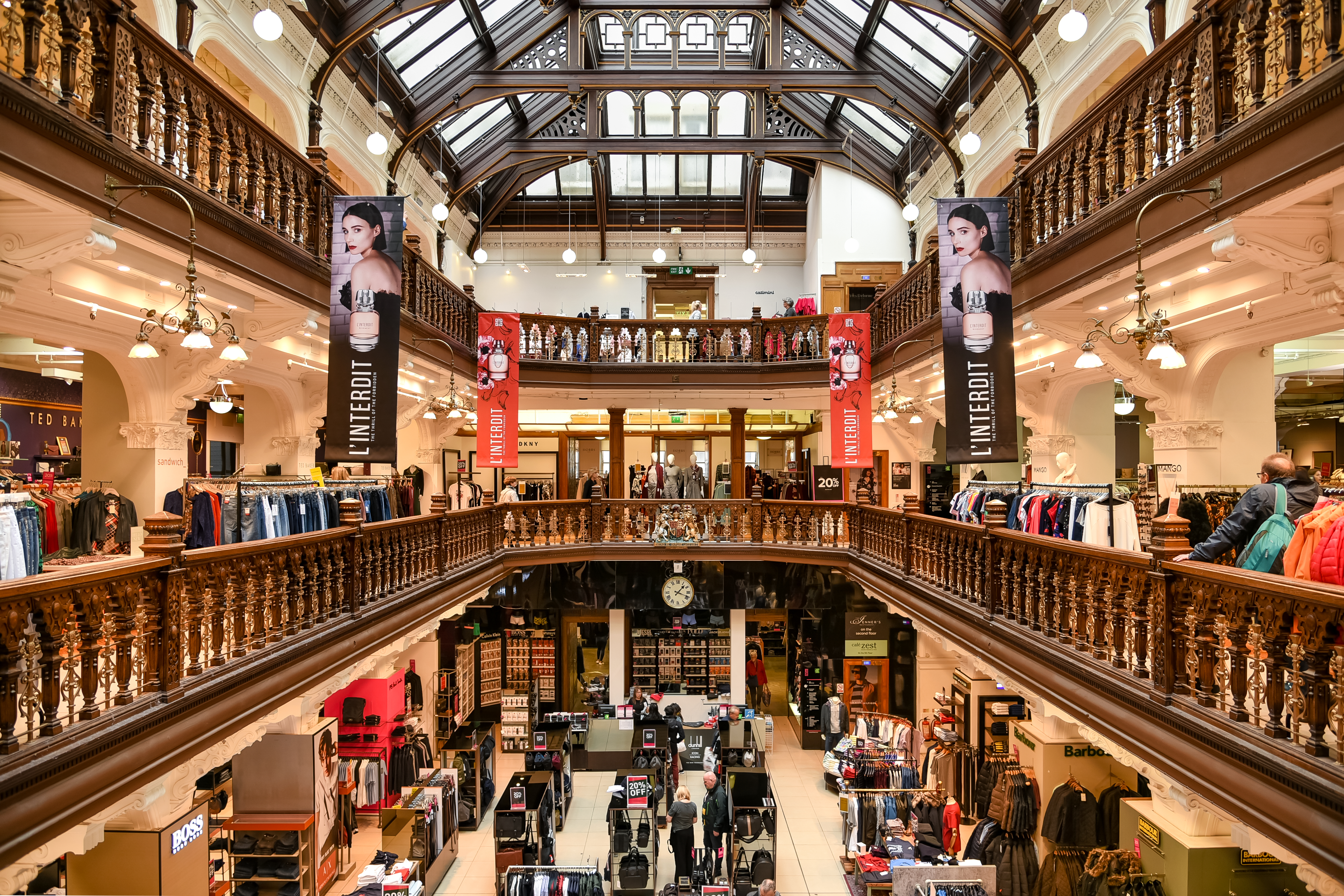
The Jenners grand hall

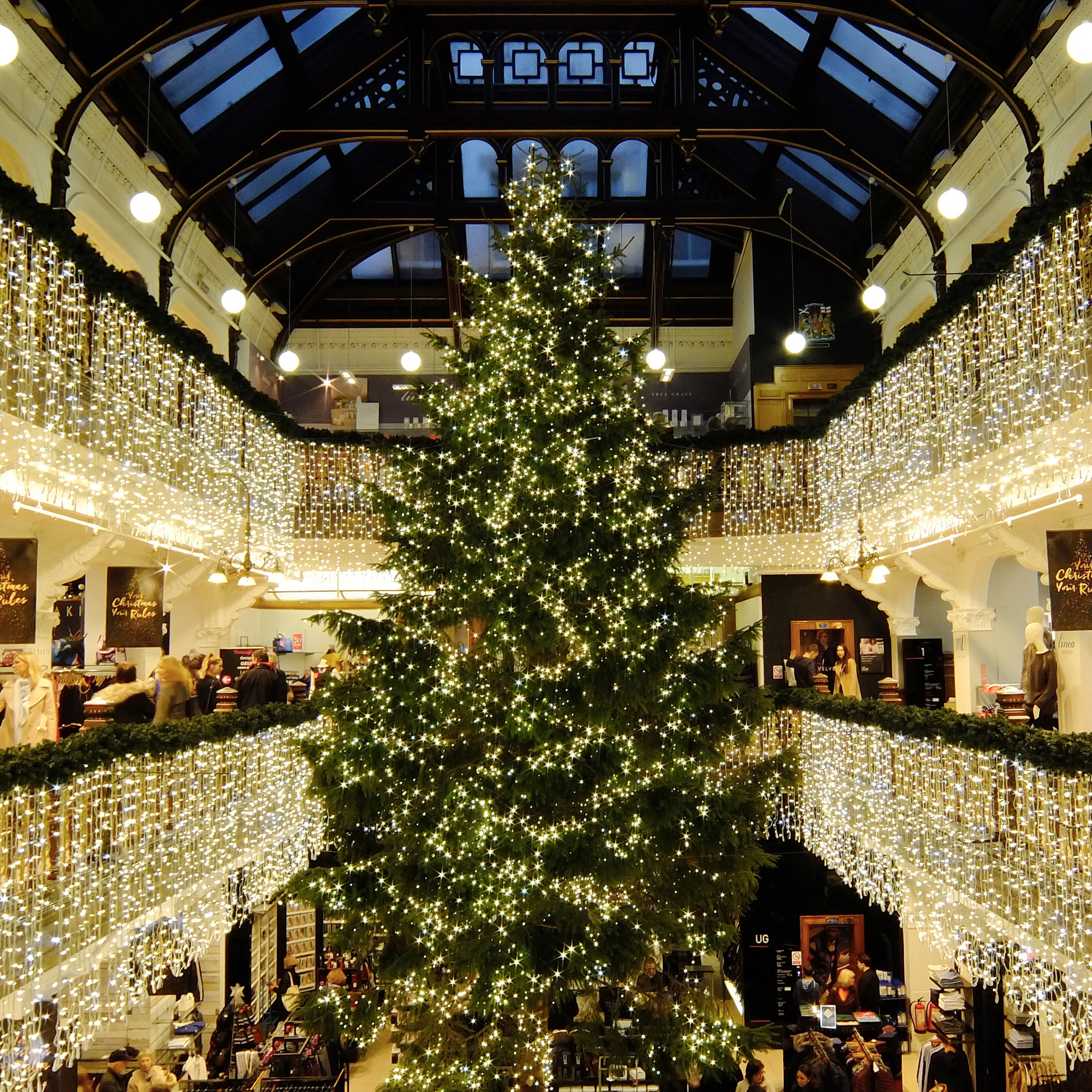
The Christmas tree in the grand hall

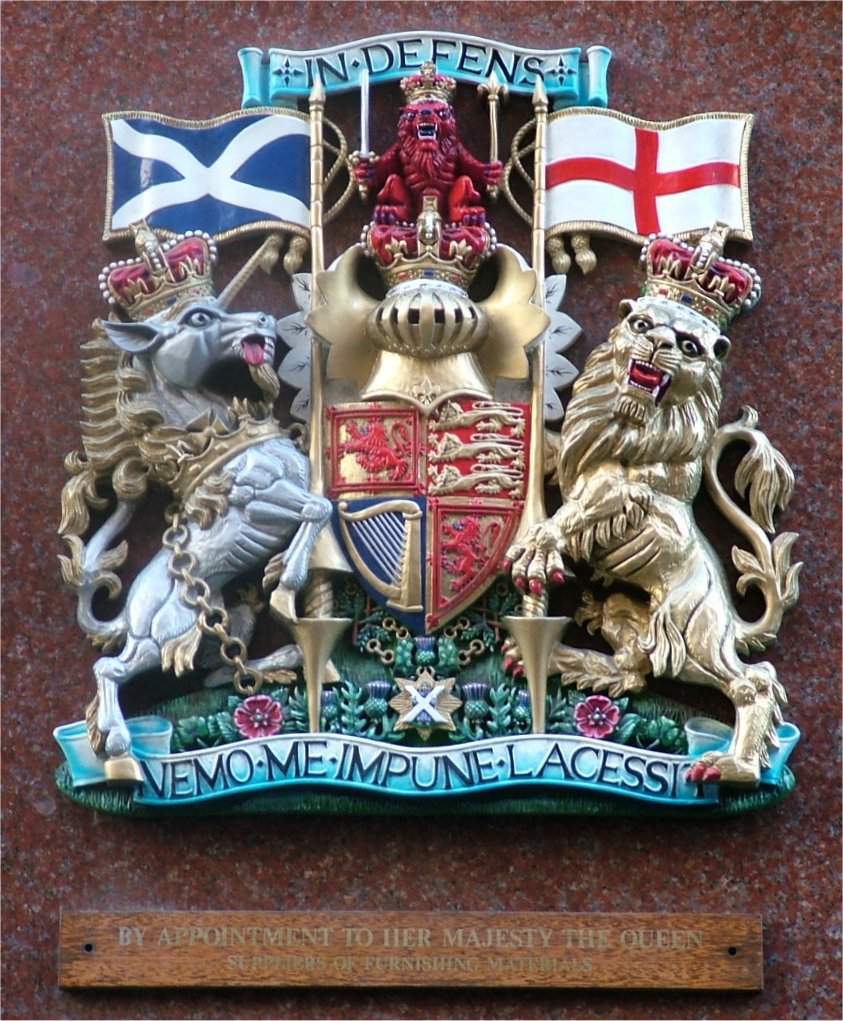
The Royal Warrant

== Stores ==
Jenners had two shops in 2020:

- Princes Street, Edinburgh
- Loch Lomond Shores

The former Jenners location in the Loch Lomond Shores outlet in Balloch remains in operation but as a dual Frasers and Sports Direct store, branding from Jenners practically absent.

Jenners previously had stores at Edinburgh Airport and Glasgow International Airport that closed following a decision announced in April 2007. Jenners said that security measures introduced in UK airports following the 2006 transatlantic aircraft plot had led to a significant downturn in trade at the shops.

== See also ==
- Queen Victoria Building
- Harrods
- Forsyth's
