= John Macdonald, Lord Kingsburgh =

Scottish Conservative politician and judge (1836–1919)

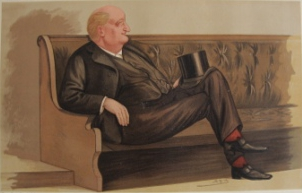
"The Lord Advocate" Macdonald as caricatured by Spy (Leslie Ward) in Vanity Fair, June 1888

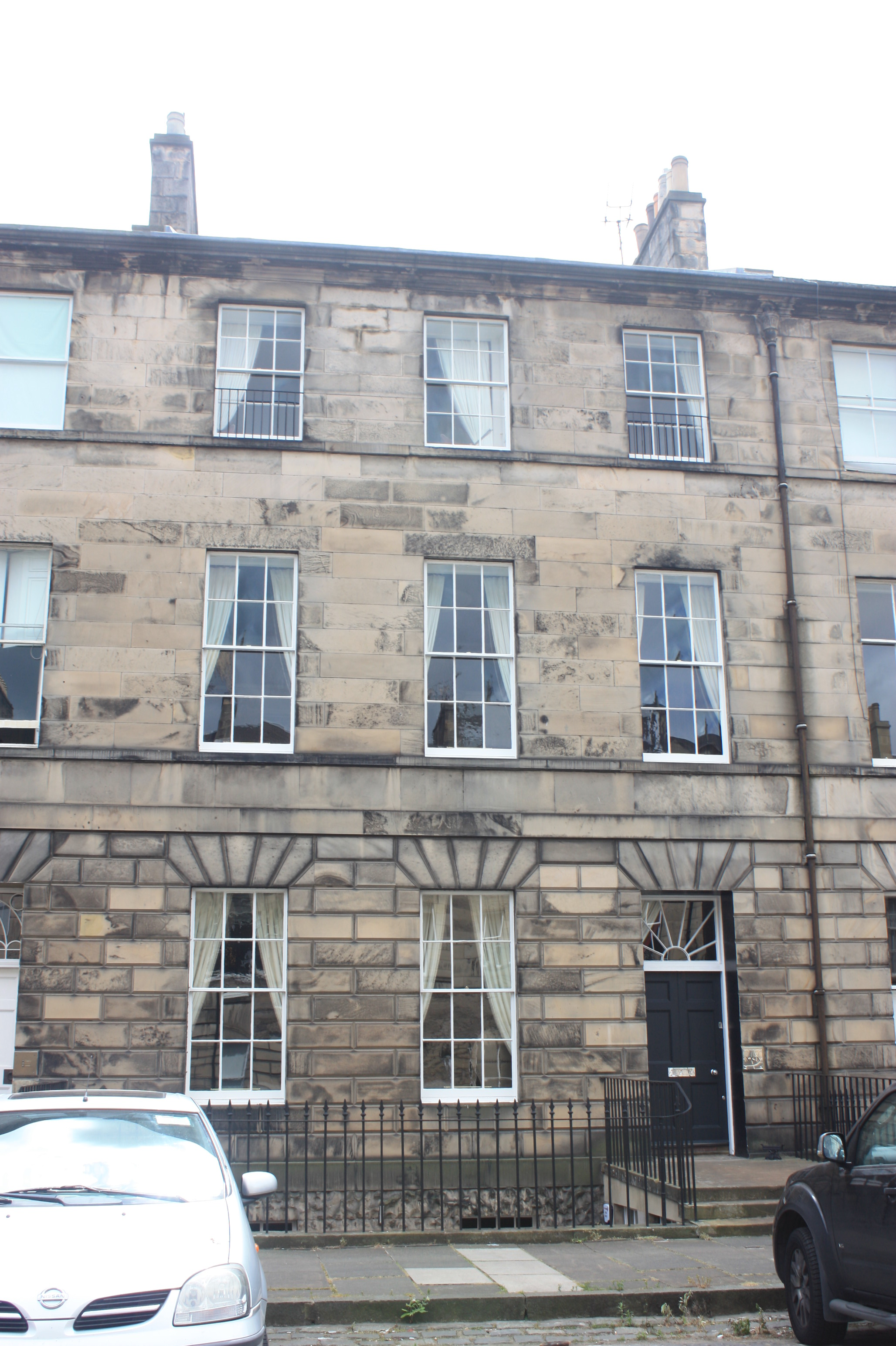
29 Great King Street, Edinburgh

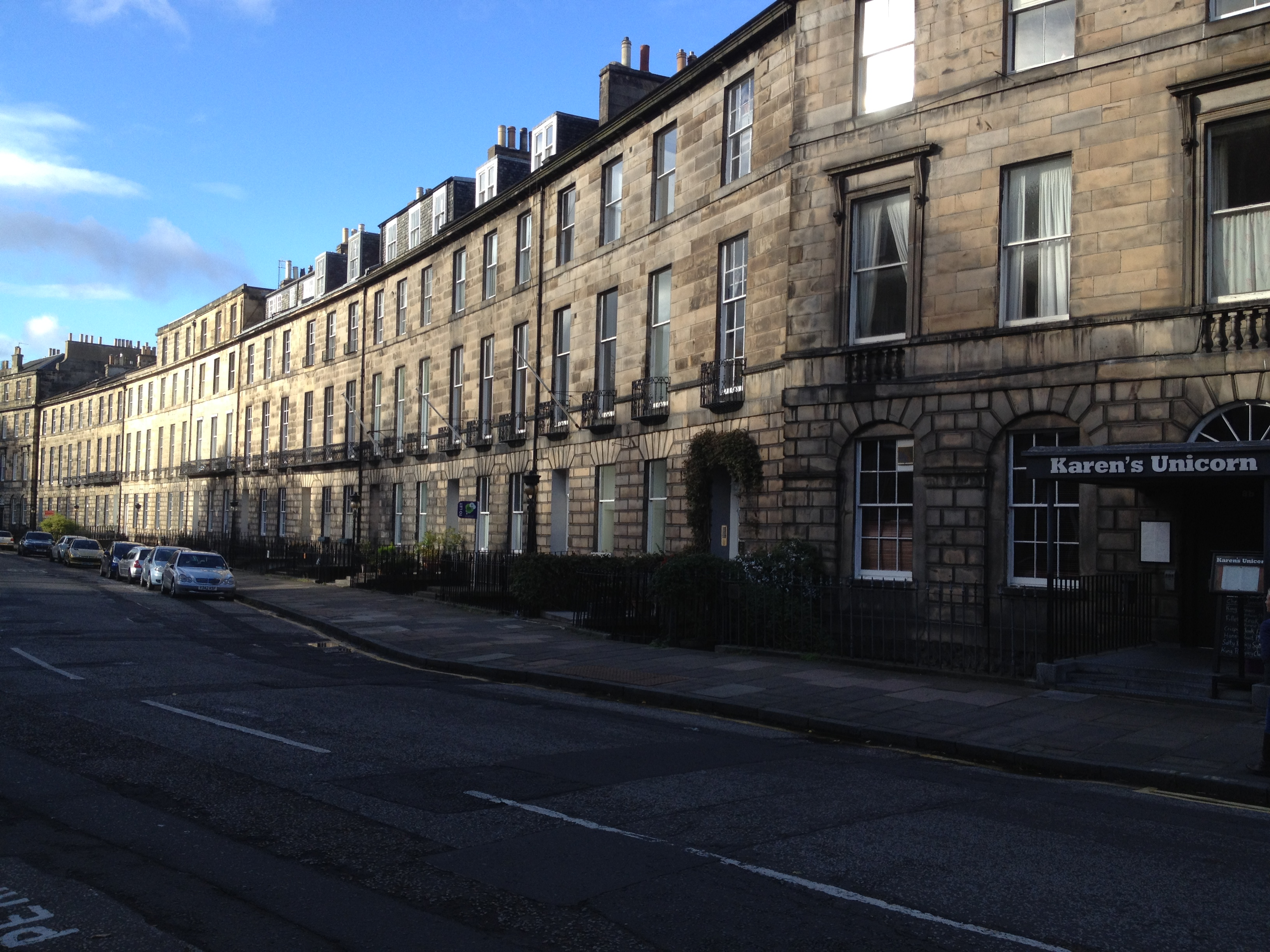
Abercromby Place, Edinburgh

Sir John Hay Athole Macdonald, Lord Kingsburgh, KCB, PC, PRSSA, FRS, FRSE (27 December 1836 – 9 May 1919) was a Scottish Conservative Party politician and later a judge.

== Life ==
Macdonald was born on 28 December 1836 at 29 Great King Street in Edinburgh's New Town, the son of Grace Hay and Matthew Norman MacDonald (later MacDonald-Hume) of Ninewells, an affluent Edinburgh lawyer. He was privately educated at Edinburgh Academy. He studied law at the University of Edinburgh and the University of Basle in Switzerland.

He was called to the Scottish bar in 1859. On 30 July 1875 he was appointed by Queen Victoria to be Sheriff of the Shires of Ross, Cromarty, and Sutherland. He was appointed Solicitor General for Scotland from 1876 to 1880. He was appointed as Sheriff of Perthshire in 1880, and served as Dean of the Faculty of Advocates from 1882 to 1885. The University of Edinburgh gave him an honorary doctorate (LLD) in 1884. In 1886 he was elected a Fellow of the Royal Society of Edinburgh. His proposers were John MacLaren, Lord MacLaren, Sir William Turner, Peter Guthrie Tait and Alexander Buchan.

Although failing to be elected in an 1879 by-election, he became a Member of Parliament (MP) at the 1885 general election for Edinburgh and St Andrews Universities, he served as Lord Advocate from 1885 to 1886 and from 1886 to 1888. He became a Queen's Counsel in 1880, and was appointed a Privy Counsellor in 1885. He was created a Knight Commander of the Order of the Bath (KCB) by Queen Victoria in 1900.

He was commissioned as a Lieutenant-Colonel in the 1st Queen's Edinburgh Rifle Volunteer Brigade in 1864, and was its Lt-Col Commandant from 1882 to 1892. He was one of the leading advocates of drill reform in the Volunteer movement, author of On the Best Detail Formation for the New Infantry Tactics (1873) and Commonsense on Parade or Drill without Strings (1886). In 1885 he organised a spectacular night assembly of the brigade, which resulted in 500 new recruits. He was later appointed as the brigade's Honorary Colonel, remaining in that role with the 5th (Queen's Edinburgh Rifles) Battalion, Royal Scots, when the Territorial Force was formed in 1908.

He gave up his Parliamentary seat and was appointed Lord Justice Clerk in 1888, taking the title Lord Kingsburgh, and presided over the Second Division of the Court of Session until 1915. He was promoted from Ensign to Lieutenant in the Royal Company of Archers on 18 June 1915.

In 1875 he became one of the founding members of the ruling council of the Cockburn Association, Edinburgh's influential conservationist organisation, becoming the body's vice-president in 1887 and then its president in 1914, relinquishing the latter office in 1918.

In the 1916 Birthday Honours King George V created him a Knight Grand Cross of the Order of the Bath (GCB).

He was an enthusiastic car owner and was a founding member of the Automobile Club and was the first president of the Scottish Automobile Club. He also registered Edinburgh's first ever number plate.

He died at home, 15 Abercromby Place, a short distance from his birthplace, on 9 May 1919. He is buried in St Cuthbert's Churchyard at the west end of Princes Street.

== Family ==
In 1864 he married Adelaide Jeanette Doran. She died in 1870.

== Publications ==
- Practical Treatise on the Criminal Law of Scotland (1887)

== References and notes ==
Parliament of the United Kingdom
Preceded by Lyon Playfair	Member of Parliament for Edinburgh and St Andrews Universities; 1885–1888	Succeeded by Moir Darling
Legal offices
Preceded by James Moncreiff	Solicitor General for Scotland; 1876–1880	Succeeded by John Millar
Preceded by John Balfour	Lord Advocate; 1885–1886	Succeeded by John Balfour
Preceded by John Balfour	Lord Advocate; 1886–1888	Succeeded by James Robertson
Preceded by Lord Moncreiff	Lord Justice Clerk; 1888–1915	Succeeded by Lord Dickson
