= The Secret History of Home Economics =

2021 non-fiction book by Danielle Dreilinger

- Author: Danielle Dreilinger
- Subject: Home economics; women's history
- Genre: Nonfiction
- Publisher: W. W. Norton & Company
- Publication date: 2021
- Pages: 348
- ISBN: 978-1324004493

The Secret History of Home Economics: How Trailblazing Women Harnessed the Power of Home and Changed the Way We Live is a 2021 nonfiction book by journalist Danielle Dreilinger. The book explores how different areas of skills, knowledge, and investigation were brought together under the umbrella of "home economics", and how the field's focus and reputation have changed over the decades in the United States.

== Summary ==
In The Secret History of Home Economics, Dreilinger, education reporter for The Times-Picayune for five years, examines how the focus of home economics swung back and forth between being a method for women to obtain scientific education to vocational training for future wives and mothers.

With the expansion of colleges after the Civil War and particularly the land-grant universities which were coed, leaders in education favored curricula focused on vocational education. "Domestic science" courses were offered for women at a number of schools during the latter half of the 19th century. This approach was fiercely debated; the president of Bryn Mawr College argued that domestic science would not nurture intellectual growth, and there were concerns among Black communities that domestic science was too much like the manual labor expected under slavery.

At Tuskegee University, Margaret Murray Washington ran the domestic science department and offered public community education, as well as publishing Work for the Colored Women of the South, a household manual for Black rural women. Ellen Swallow Richards, who had trained in chemistry, determined to improve the home through science, thus improving society. Richards wrote books about food adulteration and how to make use of chemistry in the household. The approaches taken by these women to make improvements in home life through education were the foundation for later advances.

In 1899, Annie Dewey and Richards held a conference in Lake Placid, New York with the goal of convincing universities to treat the home sciences seriously for the purpose of creating "a new profession demanding adequate compensation." The attendees settled on "home economics," positioning it as a subset of general economics. The Lake Placid conference was held annually for ten years, consciously constructing home economics as a profession for women, and would become the American Home Economics Association in 1908. The Lake Placid conferences did not invite Washington or representatives from any historically Black colleges.

By 1910, more than 200 colleges and teach-training schools, and about 900 elementary and high schools taught home economics. The need for home economists was urgent during World War I, with the need to encourage and educate Americans how to conserve food for the war effort. Washington coordinated food-conservation efforts among Black communities. The American Dietetic Association was formed in 1917 to focus on military medical-nutritional requirements; its co-founder, Lenna Cooper, was appointed supervising dietitian for the Army. Martha Van Rensselaer took on the home economics work for the US Food Administration. Home economists published recipe booklets, created menus, and identified a raft of food substitutes to encourage conservation of limited staples. The Smith–Hughes National Vocational Education Act of 1917 provided federal funding for vocational education, including home economics.

In 1923, the Bureau of Home Economics was created under the Department of Agriculture to research "the scientific basis for the mechanics of living." Under the leadership of Dr. Louise Stanley, the Bureau hired scientists in nutrition, textiles, and economics. Stanley's team produced research in areas such as vitamin content in foods, cooking and food storage methods, time management, and equipment standardization. It distributed millions of consumer bulletins. Home economists educated the public about the dangers of adulterated food.

Multiple jobs opened up for home economists in the 1920s. They were hired by food manufacturers, household equipment and furnishings producers, department stores, and advertising agencies. Appliance manufacturers hired home economists to educate consumers in using the new electrical household devices. Home economists wrote instruction manuals, marketing materials, and recipes. Independent labs hired home economists to test products. Dr. Lillian Gilbreth, unable to find work as an engineer after her husband's death, focused her efforts on home economics, publishing The Home-maker and Her Job and setting up the New York Herald-Tribune Homemaking Institute. Her kitchen work triangle design is still in use.

In the 1920s and '30s, home economists contributed to homemaking radio shows, some featuring fictional characters such as Betty Crocker (for Gold Medal Flour) and Aunt Sammy (for the Bureau of Home Economics), while others were "ordinary homemakers," such as Leanna Field Driftmier. In academia, home economics widened its focus to include child care and parenting. Some institutions obtained babies from adoption agencies or orphanages; these "practice babies" were cared for by students in "practice homes" where the students lived on rotation. (Note: After the semester concluded, the babies were made available for adoption and were in high demand.) JCPenney hired its first home economist in 1937 and she began a biannual publication for home economics teachers, Fashions and Fabrics, which included fabric swatches.

The Great Depression put a strain on the field of home economics with funding and budget cuts, and membership in the American Home Economics Association fell sharply. Home economists help develop new "famine foods" such as "Milkorno" (cornmeal, dried-milk power, and salt), "Milkwheato," and "Milkoato," Eleanor Roosevelt published It's Up to the Women, a home economics book covering budgeting, nutrition, childcare, and home furnishing, with repeated recommendations for readers to contact local home economics schools for help. (Note: The book's lunch for Tuesdays consisted of hot stuffed eggs in tomato sauce, mashed potatoes, and prune pudding.) Roosevelt promoted home economics in her My Day newspaper column as well. Numerous New Deal projects included home economics. One that had significant impact was a project to develop standardized clothing sizes, which hire hundreds of people to take more than 5,000,000 distinct measurements of nearly 150,000 children and 15,000 women. Another was to provide school lunches. The Rural Electrification Administration hired home economists to convince rural families of the advantages of electricity through a travelling expo known as the Electric Circus that demonstrated appliances to a million people in 26 states over four years.

The Bureau of Home Economics and other home economists stepped up again in World War II, with the bureau distributing 28,000,000 bulletins in 1943 alone. Clarice Scott designed women's work clothes for farm, factory, medical, and laboratory jobs, which Eleanor Roosevelt featured in a fashion show for the press. When a third of the men drafted failed physicals for nutrition-related factors, the Food and Nutrition Board was established and produced the first recommended daily allowances for vitamins and minerals, calorie intake, and basic food groups. The government featured home economists in the short films Women in Defense and Negro Colleges in War Time. Nearly 2000 dieticians were commissioned at second lieutenants in the Army; several were imprisoned at Santo Tomas Internment Camp when Japan took Corregidor.

After the war ended, there was a society-wide transformation of women's roles, with more women marrying and getting married younger, higher birth rates, fewer women attending college, and fewer women employed in the workplace. Home economics shifted to focus on training for future wives and mothers. Funding for home economics and home-ec teacher training was permanently authorized by the Vocational Education Act of 1963, and the number of girls taking home ec in high school increased. Dreilinger points out the contradiction that tens of thousands of professional home economists were "building careers telling other women to stay home, often while someone else cooked and cleaned for them." As older skills had been rendered unnecessary with modern appliances, the field expanded itself to include family life education. The American Home Economics Association updated the definition of home economics to "the field of knowledge and service primarily concerned with strengthening family life." Textbooks added content on self-improvement and how to be more likable to boys.

During the Cold War, many home economists from the United States went abroad to provide education on nutrition, health, and women's issues, many funded by foundations, the government, and the United Nations. Their efforts were both humanitarian and political, contributing to American influence. The field of business home economics—women working for corporations, product manufacturers, lobbying groups, and trade associations—grew rapidly through the 1950s and 1960s. Columbia Gas Company of Ohio had a team of home economists working as the persona of "Betty Newton," just as General Mills had many behind the character Betty Crocker. Business home economists combined instruction with sales, and were better paid than their counterparts in academia. The Betty Newtons educated both the consumers and the repairman on the gas company's appliances, wrote manuals, produced movies and radio programs. A new stove, refrigerator, or other appliance came with a house call from a Betty Newton to help the family get started with their new purchase. Business home economists provided commercial teaching aids to classrooms. Television became a new way to reach potential consumers. Mary Brown Allgood, a professor at Penn State, published Television Demonstration Techniques for Home Economists in 1953, providing methods, formats, and techniques for future cooking shows.

With the advent of the Space Race, public attention turned to scientific and technological competition with the Soviet Union; home economics, which had positioned itself as training for homemaking, was a much less important priority in that atmosphere. The pioneers of the field were retiring; programs were being closed, down-sized, or demoted in importance; the vestiges of hard science in home economics are all but gone.

Home economists found a revived purpose in the War on Poverty, working with welfare agencies and Community Action Agencies, holding workshops, giving community classes. They contributed to the establishment of Head Start and trained Head Start child care workers. Home economist Mollie Orshansky calculated the cost to buy food for a family and created an index that was used to determine the federal poverty line.

Dreilinger examines how Black women were marginalized in the field and barred from the southern states' branches of the American Home Economics Association. Even after the association desegregated in 1963, the Future Homemakers and New Homemakers remained segregated by race with separate conferences and advisory boards. Because the two organizations received federal funding, they were forced to integrate by July 1, 1965; however, leadership positions in the merged groups were primarily given to white girls and women.

A speech by feminist activist Robin Morgan at the 1971 American Home Economics Association conference triggered a revolution inside the organization, with members recognizing that they had taught one lifestyle while practicing a different one, and that they had been "perpetuating the patriarchy". Home economists began to modernize; authors of textbooks took on topics such as discrimination and inequality; home ec was promoted as vocational education for hotel managers, diet counselors, and fashion designers. In 1975, the association elected a Black president. It advocated for the metric system.

The Heritage Foundation attacked the American Home Economics Association in a 1980 booklet, claiming that its definition of family was too broad and that its teachings endorsed moral relativism; it had endorsed or supported stances that the foundation found problematic, such as gender equity, contraception, and abortion rights. Next, the field was under fire by the 1983 report, A Nation at Risk, which decried the state of the country's education system. The field fought back, with articles arguing that society was a risk from much greater problems, ones that home economics could be used to addressed. In 1986, five home economics textbooks were challenged in Smith v. Board of School Commissioners of Mobile County with the claim that they taught the tenets of secular humanism. Although the initial finding that the textbooks were unconstitutional as promoting a religion (secular humanism) was overturned on appeal, it had a chilling effect on what publishers would permit in textbooks and what teachers would present in the classroom.

By the 1990s, the American Home Economics Association had less than half the number of members it had in 1980. More professionals chose more specific titles, such as family counselors, nutritionists, interior designers, and marketing consultations. The Bureau of Labor Statistics no longer included the job title "home economist" in its Occupational Outlook Handbook. A 1993 meeting in Scottsdale recommended renaming the field "family and consumer sciences"; the association adopted the new name, but the term "home economics" continued to be used in many universities and in other countries. Despite the blows to its status and reputation over the years, more than 27,000 teachers taught family and consumer sciences to 3.5 million public school students in 2010–2012, and more than 38,000 degrees were granted by 786 U.S. universities in 2017–2018.

Dreilinger concludes with recommendations for reviving the study of home economics:

1. Change the name back to "home economics."
2. Make home economics mandatory.
3. Diversify the profession.
4. Embrace life skills as well as career preparation.
5. Advance the progressive, scientific, ecological view within home economics.

== Reception ==
In June, 2021, Secret History of Home Economics was recommended reading by The New York Times.

The Philadelphia Tribune reviewer says "Readers of women’s history will love this book, as will general historians, feminists, and anyone with an interest in domestic arts." Margaret Talbot in The New Yorker describes the book as "deeply researched and crisply written" and says "Dreilinger also does much to showcase the work of Black home economists." The review in the Star Tribune by Katherine A. Powers describes it as "a fascinating history of the field and of the contributions of some very determined women."

Virginia Postrel, reviewing for The New York Times, notes that Dreilinger views the discipline's evolution "through a contemporary progressive lens" and fails to address whether home economics still makes sense as an academic discipline. In The Wall Street Journal, Barbara Spindel calls the book captivating, but concludes, "Ms. Dreilinger charmed me with her account of home ec’s fascinating past. She didn’t quite sell me on the need for its future."

The book was longlisted for the 2022 Andrew Carnegie Medal for Excellence in Nonfiction.

In 2024, the ESSE Purse Museum in Little Rock, Arkansas, opened a special exhibition called "The Secret History of Home Economics", inspired by Dreilinger's book, that runs February through May.

== Additional reviews ==
- Salon
- Washington Post
- Foreign Affairs
- Publishers Weekly

== See also ==
- Catharine Beecher
- Doris Calloway
- Freda DeKnight
- Fabiola Cabeza de Baca Gilbert
- Marjorie Husted
- Flemmie Pansy Kittrell
- Helen S. Mitchell
- Mary Ellen Weathersby Pope
- Lydia Roberts
- Lorene Rogers
- B. Smith
- Hazel Stiebeling
