= Hazel Stiebeling =

American nutritionist

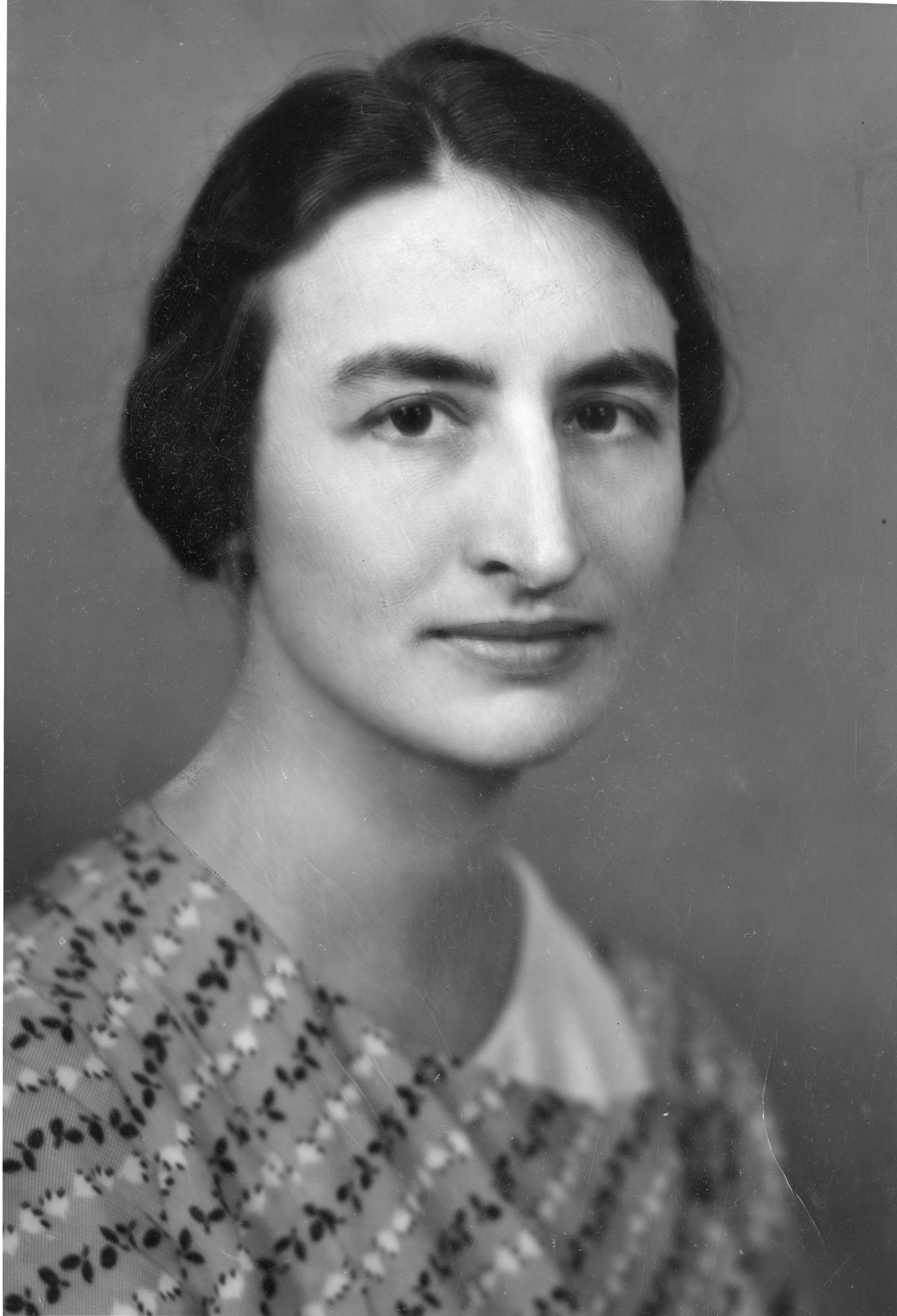
- Hazel Katherine Stiebeling, via the Smithsonian Institution Archives
- Born: March 20, 1896; Haskins, Ohio, US
- Died: May 18, 1989 (aged 93); Alexandria, Virginia, US
- Education: Columbia University
- Occupations: Nutritionist & Chemist
- Years active: 1928–1963
- Known for: Developing daily dietary allowances
- Awards: Borden Award (1943), USDA Distinguished Service Medal (1952), President's Award for Distinguished Federal Civilian Service (1959)

Hazel Katherine Stiebeling (1896–1989) was an American nutritionist who pioneered the development of USDA programs for nutrition including USDA Recommended Dietary Allowances (RDAs) of vitamins and minerals. Stiebeling made important contributions to the understanding of diet composition, nutritional value of foods, dietary guidelines, and the idea and development of dietary standards. Among her recommendations were drinking more milk, eating fresh fruit and green vegetables. She also helped to develop plans for disaster relief in the South during the economic hardships of the Great Depression. In 1959, Stiebeling became the first woman to receive the President's Award for Distinguished Federal Civilian Service. In 1964, she was named a Distinguished Fellow of the American Society for Nutrition (DFASN).

== Early life and education ==
Hazel Katherine Stiebeling was born on March 20, 1896, to Adam Stiebeling and Elizabeth Brand on their farm near Haskins, Ohio. Her parents were German immigrants. Hazel was one of six children. Living on a farm is believed to have developed her interest in food and nutrition. She began to study domestic science in high school.

After high school, Stiebeling enrolled in a two year program in domestic science at Skidmore College. She later said she discovered Henry Sherman's book, The Chemistry of Food and Nutrition, in the college's library and was inspired by it. She graduated in Skidmore's class of 1915.

Stiebeling was employed for three years as a schoolteacher before entering the Columbia University Teachers' College. There she was an assistant in Foods and Nutrition, working with Mary Swartz Rose. Stiebeling received a Bachelor's degree in Science from Columbia University in 1919, and a Masters in nutrition in 1924.

Stiebeling then became a research fellow under Henry Sherman at the Graduate School of Columbia University. Her research included in the basal metabolism of women, the effects of vitamin D on the deposition of calcium in bone, the nutritional value of protein in human subjects, and other projects. Stiebeling received her PhD in chemistry from Columbia in 1928. Her thesis was on a method for studying the concentration of vitamins A and D in tissues.

== Career and Research ==
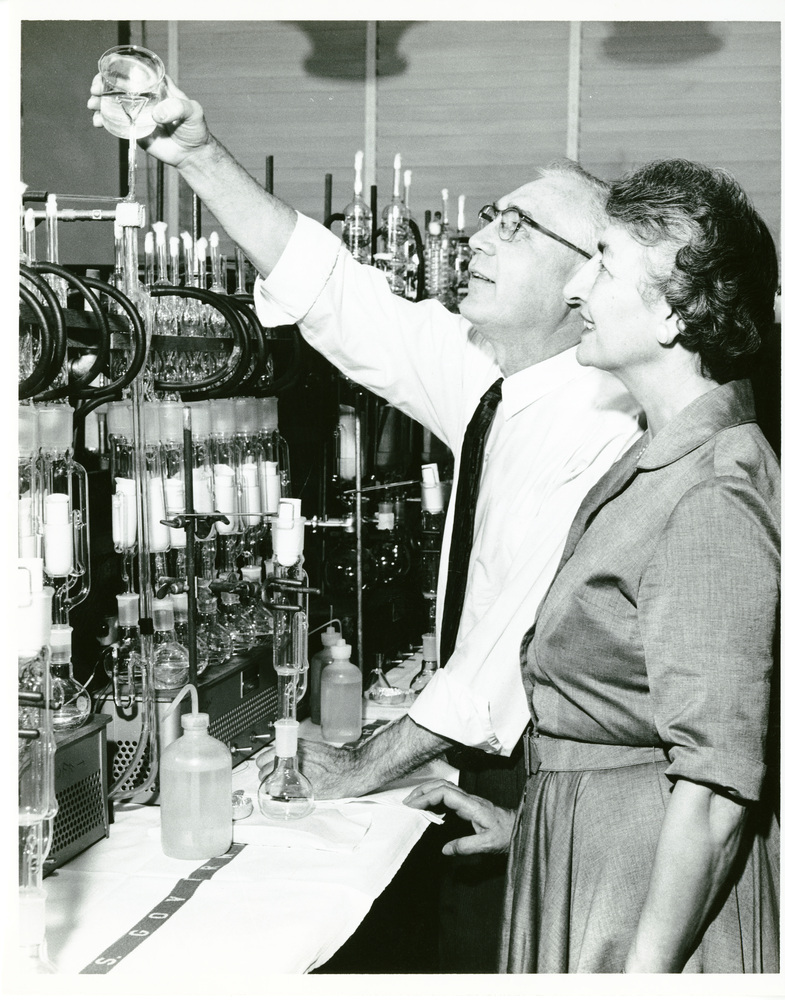
Hazel Stiebeling (right)

In 1930, after graduation from the PhD program, Stiebeling was hired as Head of the Section on Food Economics at the USDA Bureau of Home Economics. The Bureau of Home Economics had been formed in 1923. The Chief of the Food and Nutrition Division was Louise Stanley.

At the Bureau, Stiebeling began an extensive long-term investigation of the nutritional value of diets in the United States. In 1933, Stiebeling and others produced a USDA publication on diet planning in 1933 that was the first known publication to include the term "dietary allowances". Stiebeling called for quantitative benchmarks that could be used to compare the nutritional value of foods with the nutrient needs of the body. This was the first quantitative national dietary standard for the minerals calcium, iron, phosphorus, and vitamins A and C. Values were based on her research in the Sherman laboratory.

Among her tasks at the Bureau, Stiebeling helped to develop emergency plans to provide food to those suffering from serious droughts in the Southern United States during the Great Depression. Stiebeling's work also included the first national survey of consumer purchasing in the USA, carried out in 1935–36. President Franklin D. Roosevelt summarized the results of the study when he stated in his second inaugural address on January 20, 1937 that “I see one-third of a nation ill-housed, ill-clad, ill-nourished.”

In 1939 Stiebeling worked with Esther Phipard to include USDA dietary allowances for thiamine and riboflavin. Their proposal for recognizing some variance between individuals in a population also stimulated an "allowance of a margin of 50% above the average minimum for normal maintenance [...] an estimate intended to cover individual variations of minimal nutritional need among apparently normal people." This work led to publication of the Recommended Dietary Allowances by the Food and Nutrition Board of the National Academy of Sciences in 1943. Stiebeling's technique became the standard for developing dietary plans, used by international organizations like the FAO and the WHO.

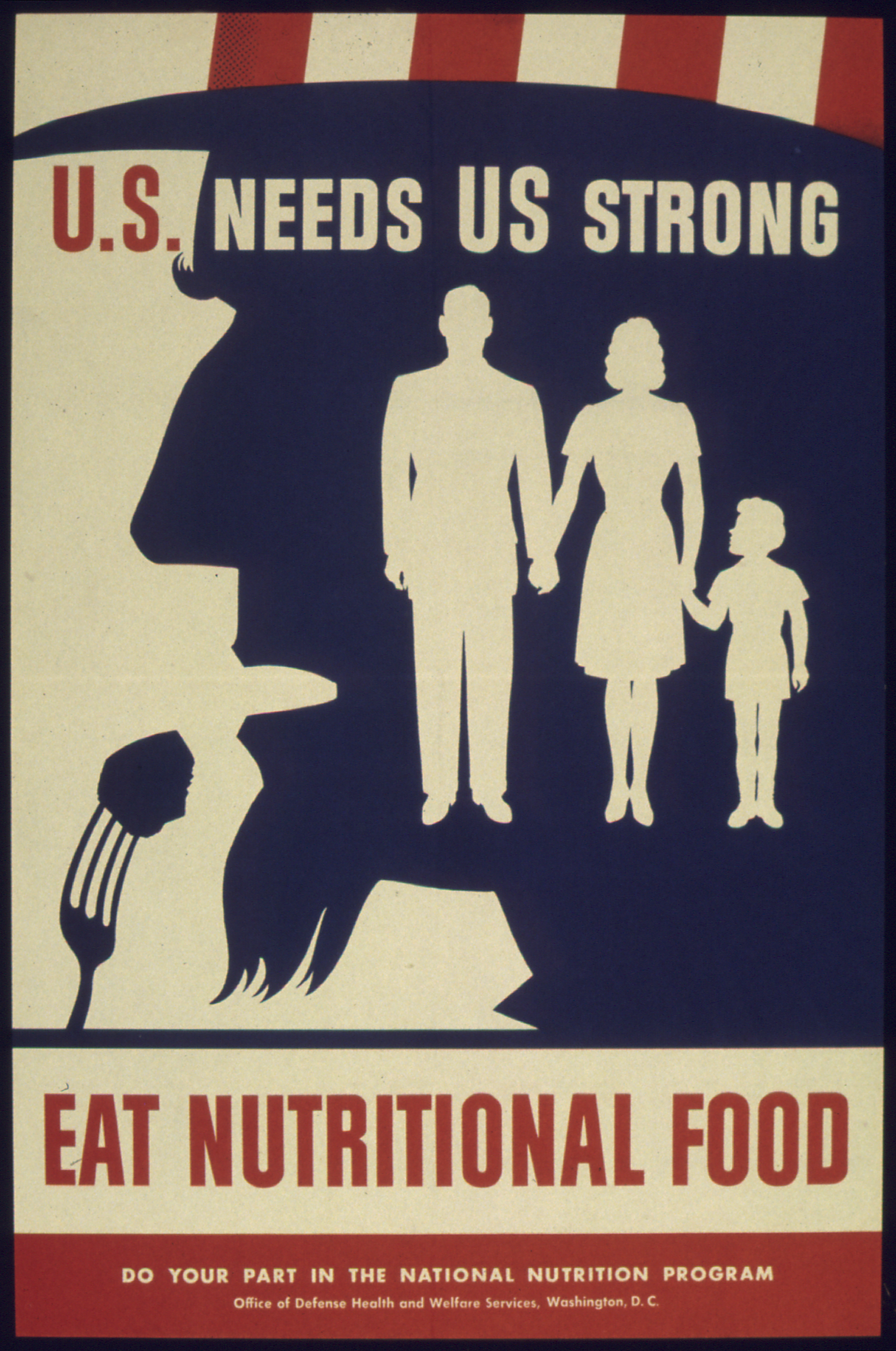
World War II poster: U.S. needs us strong : eat nutritional food

During World War II, the Food and Nutrition Board (FNB) was founded “to advise on nutrition problems in connection with National Defense.” One quarter of those drafted under the Selective Service Act of 1940 were found to be malnourished and unfit. Stiebeling and other scientists worked together with government agencies and members of Congress to design and implement programs to improve public health of both military and civilians. Initiatives included enrichment of flour with iron and B vitamins, nutritional education, and school lunch programs.

As of 1941, laboratory research for the USDA’s Bureau of Home Economics was relocated to the Agricultural Research Center (ARC) in Beltsville, MD. In 1944, Stiebeling was named Chief of the Bureau of Human Nutrition and Home Economics. In 1953, the former Bureau of Human Nutrition and Home Economics became a department of the Agricultural Research Center and Hazel Stiebeling became Director of the department of Home Economics Research (1953–1957). As Director, she was responsible to the Deputy Administrator of the ARS, Callie Mae Coons. Stiebeling subsequently became Director of the Institute of Home Economics (1957–1961) and finally Deputy Administrator of the Agricultural Research Service, researching nutrition and consumer use (1961–1963).

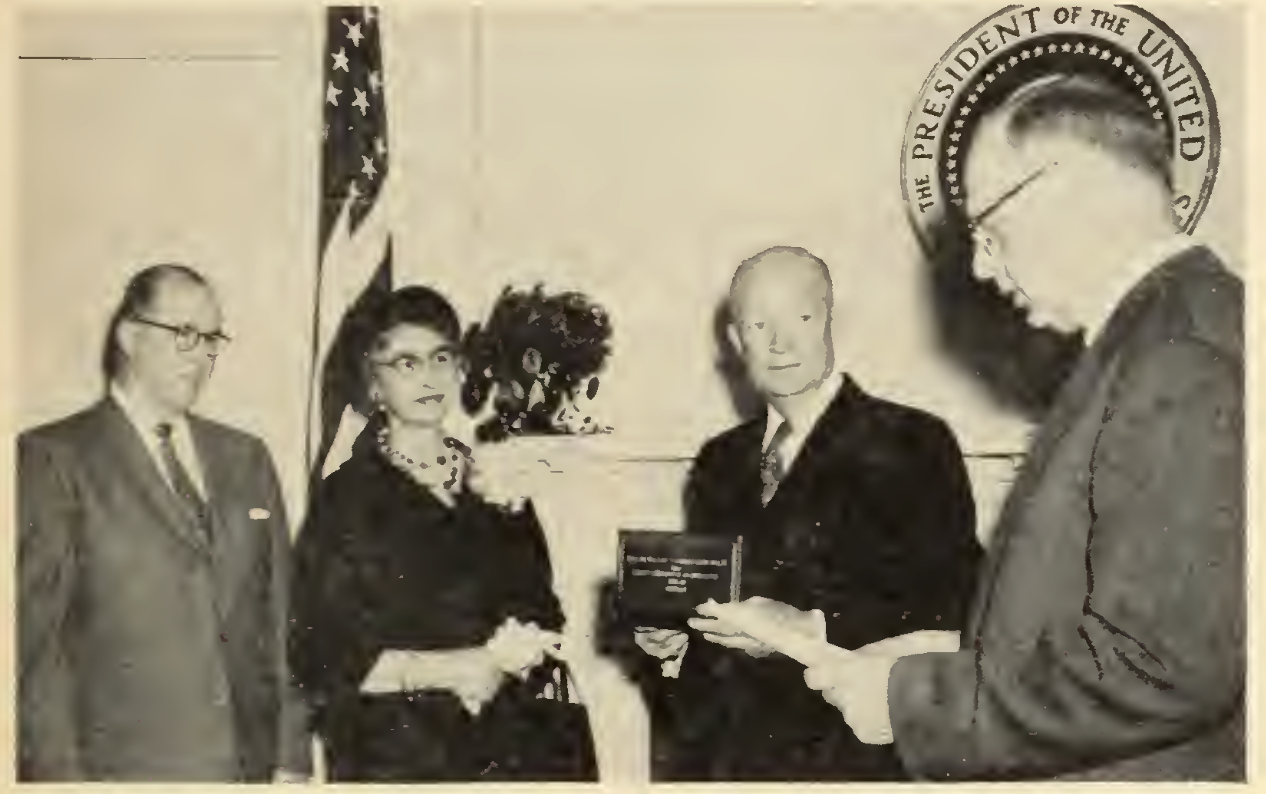
Hazel Stiebeling (center left) about to receive the President's award for distinguished federal service from President Eisenhower (center right), 1959.

In 1959, Stiebeling received the President's Award for Distinguished Federal Civilian Service from President Eisenhower. Eisenhower commended her for "her lasting contributions to the science of human nutrition and through this to the health of the American people." Stiebeling was the first woman to receive the award. In 1963, Stiebeling retired from the U. S. Department of Agriculture.

Hazel Stiebeling died on May 18, 1989, in Alexandria, Virginia.

== Selected Publications ==
- National Agricultural Library (USDA). "The Last Chief." Aprons & Kitchen: The Bureau of Home Economics Exhibit. National Agricultural Library.
- National Agricultural Library (USDA). Hazel Katherine Stiebeling Papers. Special Collections, USDA.
- Stiebling, Hazel Katherine; Munsell, Hazel E. (1932). Food supply and pellagra incidence in 73 South Carolina farm families. Washington, D.C.: United States Government.

== Awards ==
- 1943, Borden Award for research in nutrition, American Home Economics Association
- 1952, Distinguished Service Award, USDA
- 1959, President's award for Distinguished Federal Service
- 1964, Distinguished Fellow of the American Society for Nutrition (DFASN)
- 1972, honored as one of 50 distinguished alumni of Skidmore College
