= Hazel E. Munsell =

American educator

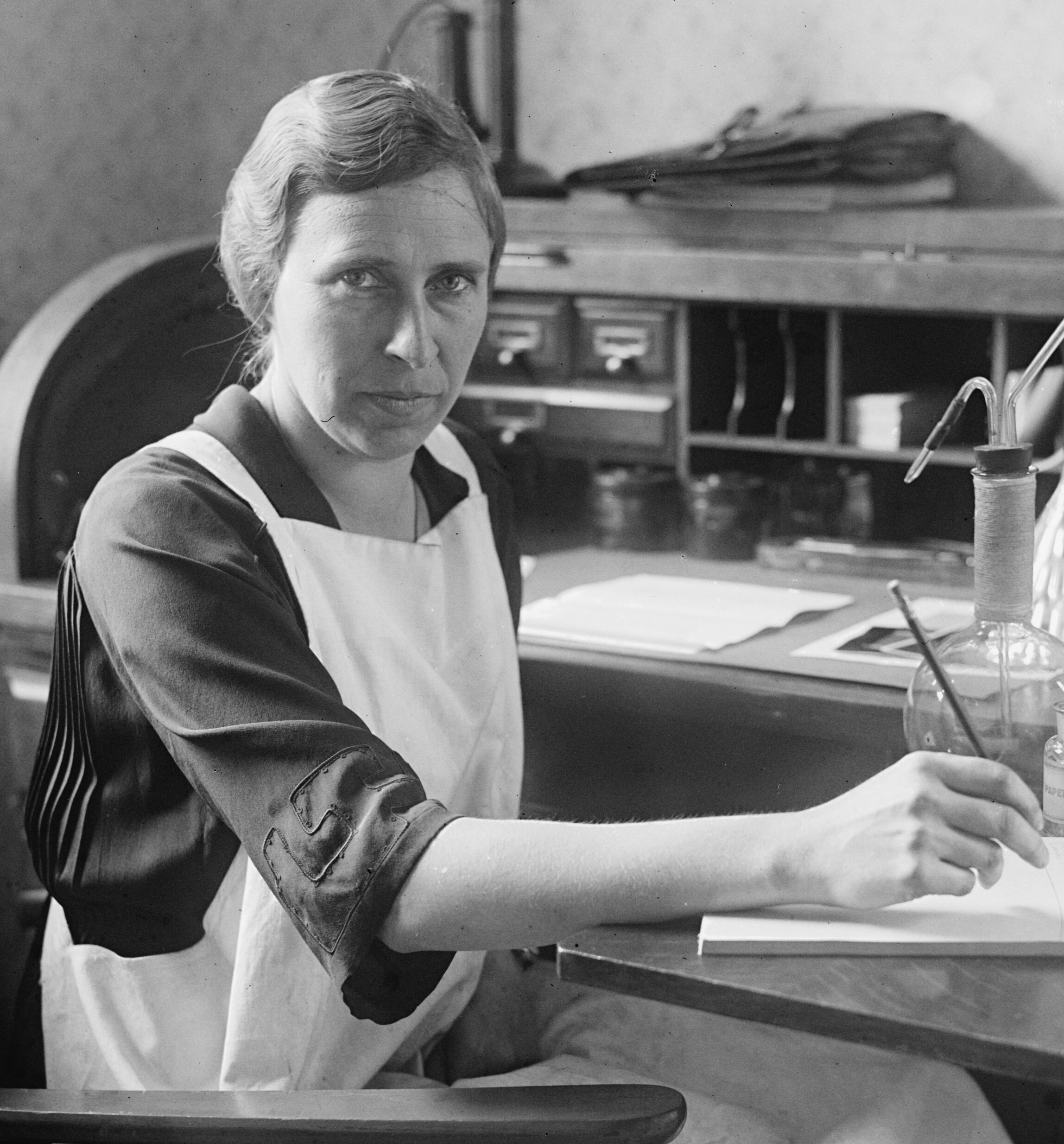
- Portrait of Munsell in 1924
- Born: Hazel Edith Munsell; April 9, 1891; Monson, Massachusetts, U.S.
- Died: February 17, 1989 (aged 97); Mount Holyoke, Massachusetts, U.S.
- Resting place: Hillside Cemetery

Academic background
- Education: Mount Holyoke College (BA); Columbia University (MA, PhD)
- Thesis: Quantitative Determination of Relative Amounts of Vitamin A

Hazel Edith Munsell (April 9, 1891 – February 17, 1989) was an American chemist, educator, and researcher from Massachusetts. A researcher on nutrition and vitamins, she conducted studies at Columbia University, the Massachusetts Institute of Technology, the Bureau of Home Economics, and in Puerto Rico and Ecuador. She is credited alongside Henry Clapp Sherman with the Sherman-Musnell unit, a measurement of Vitamin A in rats.

== Early life ==
Hazel Edith Munsell was born on April 9, 1891, in Monson, Massachusetts, to Nellie (née Smith) and Killey B. Munsell. She also lived in Wilbraham, Massachusetts. She graduated from Monson Academy (later Wilbraham & Monson Academy) in 1909. She graduated with a Bachelor of Arts from Mount Holyoke College in 1914.

Munsell taught at Stamford Seminary and Union Free schools in Stamford, New York, from 1914 to 1917. She returned to Mount Holyoke and was a research fellow in chemistry from 1917 to 1918. She taught chemistry and physics at Pratt Institute from 1918 to 1921. She graduated from Columbia University with a Master of Arts in 1921 and a PhD in chemistry in 1924. Her PhD thesis was "Quantitative Determination of Relative Amounts of Vitamin A". According to The Springfield Republican, she was the first woman from Monson to receive a PhD. She conducted research on food and nutrition in coordination with Henry Clapp Sherman and the Miltauk Memorial Fund of the New York Association for Improving the Condition of the Poor. She was a member of Kappa Chapter of Sigma Xi.

== Career ==
In October 1924, Munsell began working as a senior nutrition chemist under Louise Stanley at the Bureau of Home Economics of the United States Department of Agriculture in Washington, D.C. She studied nutrition and vitamin science with rat subjects. By 1934, she was chief of the nutrition studies section at the Bureau of Home Economics. In 1938, she served as specialist of nutrition research. She remained in that role until 1942. The Sherman-Munsell unit is a rat growth unit for the daily amount of Vitamin A which sustains a rate of 3 grams a week in weight gain for standard test rats. It is named for both Henry Clapp Sherman and Munsell.

From 1942 to 1944, Munsell was a research assistant in biochemistry and clinical research at the School of Tropical Medicine in San Juan, Puerto Rico. From 1944 to 1946, she worked as a chemist at the nutrition lab in The Pentagon. In 1946, she was appointed as research associate in food technology at the Nutritional Biochemistry Laboratories of the Department of Food Technology at the Massachusetts Institute of Technology. She conducted a three-year food study at MIT's nutritional biochemistry laboratory on three weeds found in Central America: Lamb's quarters, chipilín, and mucuy or mora. In 1950, she went to Quito, Ecuador, to serve as director of the Bromatological Laboratory in support of the National Institute of Nutrition. The work was associated with the Ecuadorian and Pan-American Sanitary Bureau, an agent of the World Health Organization. She remained in Ecuador for seven years to set up a nutrition institute for the United Nations.

After her return to the United States, Munsell continued teaching at the National Cathedral School for Girls in Washington, D.C., and retired in 1957. She was a charter member of the American Institute of Nutrition, a member of the American Chemical Society, a member of the American Dietetic Association, and a member of the American Association for the Advancement of Science. She was also a member of the American Home Economics Association.

== Personal life and legacy ==
Munsell was a member of the Congregational Church. She enjoyed horseback riding and walking.

Munsell died on February 17, 1989, at a Holyoke nursing home. She was buried in Hillside Cemetery. Her writings are available at the Mount Holyoke Campus Archives.

== Works ==
From 1924 to 1965, she published on nutrition. She published over 60 papers. She also wrote about her travels in the Mount Holyoke Alumnae Quarterly.

Selected publications

- Munsell, Hazel E. (1924). The quantitative determination of relative amounts of Vitamin A (thesis). New York: Columbia University.
- Daniel, Esther Charlotte Peterson; Munsell, Hazel E. (1932). The vitamin A, B, C, and G content of Concord grapes Vitis labrusca. Washington, D.C.: Journal of Agricultural Research.
- Daniel, Esther Charlotte Peterson; Munsell, Hazel E. (1932). The vitamin A, B, C, and G content of Sultanina (Thompson seedless) and Malaga Vitis vinifera grapes and two brands of commercial grape juice. Washington, D.C.: Journal of Agricultural Research.
- Kifer, Hilda Black; Munsell, Hazel E. (1932). Vitamin content of three varieties of spinach. Washington, D.C.: United States Government.
- Munsell, Hazel E.; Kifer, Hilda Black. (1932). The vitamin B and G content of raw and cooked broccoli. Journal of Home Economics.
- Munsell, Hazel E. (1932). Theses in Home Economics. Titles of unpublished theses in field of home economics completed during years 1924–1931. Washington, D.C.: U.S. Bureau of Home Economics.
- Stiebling, Hazel Katherine; Munsell, Hazel E. (1932). Food supply and pellagra incidence in 73 South Carolina farm families. Washington, D.C.: United States Government.
- Munsell, Hazel E. (1934). Notes on vitamin units. Washington, D.C.: U.S. Bureau of Home Economics.
- Munsell, Hazel E. (1935). Foods rich in vitamins A, B, C, D, E, and G. Washington, D.C.: United States Government.
- Munsell, Hazel E.; DeVaney, Grace M.; Kennedy, Mary H. (1936). Toxicity of food containing selenium as shown by its effect on the rat. Washington, D.C.: United States Government.
- Munsell, Hazel E.; Kennedy, Mary H. (1936). The vitamin A, B, C, D, and G content of the outer green leaves and the inner bleached leaves of iceberg lettuce Lactuca sativa. Washington, D.C.: Journal of Agricultural Research.
- Daniel, Esther Peterson; Munsell, Hazel E. (1937). Vitamin Content of Foods. A summary of the chemistry of vitamins, units of measurement, quantitative aspects in human nutrition and occurrence in foods. Washington, D.C.: United States Government.
- Munsell, Hazel E. (1938). Vitamin A, methods of assay and food sources. Journal of American Medical Association.
- Munsell, Hazel E. (1938). Vitamin B, methods of assay and food sources. Journal of American Medical Association.
- Munsell, Hazel E. (1942). Vitamins and their occurrence in foods. Washington, D.C.: Smithsonian Institution.
- Munsell, Hazel E.; Cuadros, Ana María; Suárez, Ramón M., et al. (1944). A study of plasma ascorbic acid values with relation to the type of diet used in Puerto Rico by groups of individuals of widely varied economic status. The Wistar Institute of Anatomy and Biology.
- Pattee, Alida Frances (1945). Munsell, Hazel E. (ed.). Patee's Dietetics. New York: G. P. Putnam's Sons.
- Harris, R. S.; Munsell, Hazel E. (1950). Edible Plants of Central America. Journal of Home Economics.
- Johnson, Doris (1951). Munsell, Hazel E. (ed.). Modern Dietetics. New York: G. P. Putnam's Sons.
