= Mary Ellen Weathersby Pope =

American educator (1905–2007)

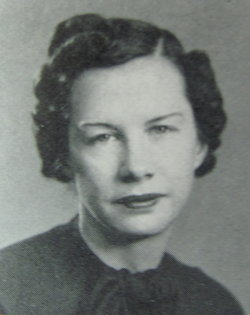
- Born: April 14, 1905; Liberty, Mississippi
- Died: March 28, 2007 (aged 101); Columbus, Mississippi
- Occupation: Educator
- Awards: Medal of Excellence (MUW); Alumnae Achievement Award (MUW); Celebration of Service Award (Lowndes County Chapter, MUW Alumni Association)

Academic background
- Education: Mississippi State College for Women (BS); University of Minnesota (MS)

Academic work
- Institutions: Mississippi State College for Women; George Peabody College for Teachers; Louisiana State University; Mississippi State College; Mississippi Department of Education

Mary Ellen Weathersby Pope (April 14, 1905 – March 28, 2007) was a reformist and home economics educator who worked at Mississippi State College for Women (MSCW, later renamed to Mississippi University for Women and commonly referred to as "The W"), which was the first public college for women in the United States. She was a graduate of MSCW's home economics program (the first in Mississippi) and, according to Jolly, embodied the reformist spirit of the home economics movement by advancing women's entry into positions of educational leadership, the inclusion and equal treatment of black Mississippians, and vocational adult education to improve the lives of the rural poor.

Weathersby Pope earned an honorary doctorate from Mississippi University for Women (MUW) in 2004; she was also the recipient of MUW's Medal of Excellence, an Alumnae Achievement Award, and a Celebration of Service Award from the Lowndes County Chapter of the MUW Alumni Association. She and her sister endowed the Weathersby Centennial Scholarship (The W's most prestigious scholarship), and MUW's Pope Banquet Hall bears her name.

== Early life and family ==
Mary Ellen Weathersby was born to Robert Lodwic Weathersby and Ellen Harrell Weathersby on April 14, 1905, in Liberty, Mississippi. At the time she was born, the Weathersbys already had two sons (Van Huff and Charles Harrell), and two daughters (Nema and Anna Marguerite); two more daughters were also to follow. In Liberty, her father ran a general store with his brothers, selling "everything ... from potatoes to women's clothes." The business was a success; however, Robert contracted typhoid fever when Mary Ellen was around three years old and never fully recovered. With Robert physically unable to work, the family moved one county east—to Magnolia, Mississippi—and purchased the Victoria Hotel in 1912. Ellen Harrell managed the hotel and, before his death at age 55 on March 16, 1918, Robert kept the books.

Mary Ellen's mother, Ellen Weathersby, influenced her daughter's worldview by demonstrating that a woman could balance motherhood with a career and positions of leadership in her community. Late in life, she remembered watching her mother supervise male employees and took note of how "Mrs. Weathersby's hotel" developed a reputation for cleanliness and good food that made it a popular stop for salesmen traveling along the Illinois Central Railroad. For Mary Ellen, there was no question that domestic industry was socially and economically important, and her mother insisted that she had a knack for the work, encouraging her to pursue a career teaching home economics.

== Education and career ==
=== Education ===
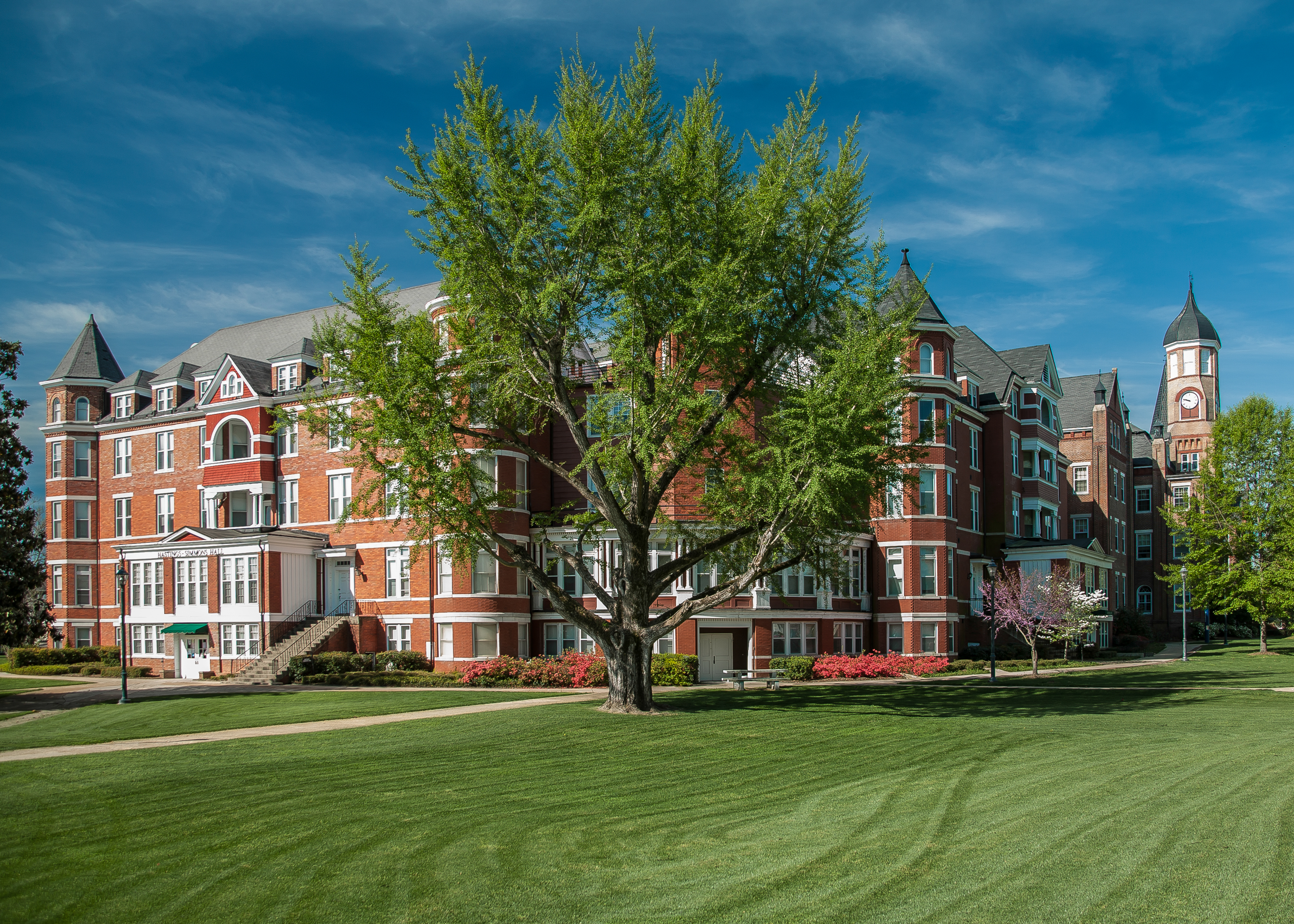
Mary Ellen Weathersby Pope attended Mississippi State College for Women and graduated with a bachelor's degree in home economics.

Weathersby's mother instilled in her a belief in the importance of education and financial security, and she was insistent that each girl would earn a degree, become a teacher, and enjoy financial independence. The boys, her mother said, would be able to make it on their own, but the girls needed an education so they could support themselves. As Weathersby and her sisters grew up, she witnessed how her mother carefully managed the family's finances to ensure they could attend MSCW, whose status as a public college for women made it an affordable choice.

Mary Ellen Weathersby entered college in 1922 when she was fifteen years old. Weathersby began attending MSCW at such a young age because her mother staggered the entry of her and her sisters to reduce the financial strain placed on the family at any single point in time. At MSCW, Weathersby appreciated the difficult chemistry coursework she completed and her experience of living with six other home economics students in a demonstration home on campus in their senior year. In the demonstration home, the seniors raised chickens, grew a garden, and practiced the budgeting and conservation skills that would become essential to her work during WWII and the Great Depression.

=== Early career ===
Over the next several years, Weathersby taught high school home economics and spent her summers beginning graduate coursework at Columbia University in New York, attending workshops at Mississippi colleges, and conducting camps for the Young Women's Christian Association (YWCA).

Her first teaching position was in Anguilla, Mississippi, and she was there to witness the Great Mississippi Flood of 1927. After the flood, she taught in Canton, where she developed a close relationship with Esther Rogers, State Supervisor of Home Economics in the Mississippi Department of Education. While in this position, the Great Depression began, and Weathersby experienced the failure of her bank and the loss of funding for her home economics program. Like many others in the home economics movement, she turned instruction toward conservation and self-sufficiency. She had her class plant a garden and taught them to prepare meals with whatever it yielded. Students brought old clothes from home and learned to remodel them.

Similarly, after she had begun teaching in Vicksburg, she taught adult women to make clothing for their children during a summer workshop at Mississippi Southern College in Hattiesburg (now the University of Southern Mississippi). She forfeited a registration fee at the University of Iowa to participate in the workshop at the urging of State Supervisor Rogers, and it ended up marking the beginning of efforts to teach adults through Mississippi's tertiary vocational programs. She immediately put the lessons into practice, teaching an evening nutrition class to nurses in Vicksburg for the next two years.

=== First tenure at The W ===
In 1935, Weathersby returned to teach at The W and would go on to teach there, off and on, until her retirement in 1974. In her first tenure as a home economics professor, she worked with Mary Wilson to make adult education classes and teaching demonstrations part of the curriculum. During the summers and across a year-long leave of absence, she completed a master's degree in home economics from the University of Minnesota.

In 1940, President B. L. Parkinson created a new position for her: Assistant Dean of Students. In this role, she became the first student counselor and, together with President Parkinson and his wife, Dera Dry Parkinson (who was one of the first women to earn a PhD in psychology), they created the first counseling program at MSCW. However, Weathersby soon recognized that the position required more knowledge of psychology and counseling than she had. In addition, she chafed at the old-fashioned beliefs of the Parkinsons, who tried to limit the topics she covered in a sex education class, and they also wanted her to measure the distance between couples at school dances and to create and teach a curriculum on etiquette.

=== Mid-career experiences ===
In 1942, she decided to leave The W for the chance to help develop a vocational curriculum for the department of home economics at George Peabody College for Teachers in Nashville, Tennessee. She served as the head of the department in her second year, but because the department had largely turned away from the social welfare and social feminist heritage of the discipline, Weathersby felt that her progressive views were a poor match for the institute.

In 1943, she returned to Mississippi, this time as assistant state supervisor of home economics for the state Department of Education. Her position with the Mississippi Department of Education allowed her to partner with professors of agriculture for team teaching at Mississippi Southern College (now the University of Southern Mississippi). In addition to classes at the college, they offered adults lessons in producing, harvesting, and canning to improve self-sufficiency and food safety. By 1944, she helped bring together roughly twenty vocational institutions—including Mississippi State College (later renamed Mississippi State University), The W, and the Mississippi Department of Education—together to offer the North Mississippi Canning and Food Processing Demonstration School. Adults were taught to can and process different varieties of fruits and vegetables, then samples were sent to MSC's chemistry lab for analysis during a second training event. The results were used to generate state policies for food processing plants.

With the end of World War II in 1945, Weathersby decided to take a position training home economics teachers at Louisiana State University, but she was back in Mississippi by the end of 1946. This time, MSC and The W brought her in to build and coordinate a joint graduate program in home economics at the two colleges. Officially, she served as head of the home economics division and worked alongside the dean of the school of agriculture. Besides teaching and curriculum development, the two traveled to Alcorn College (the first black land grant college in the nation) to review the agriculture and home economics programs there. They issued a report and worked with Alcorn's president to lobby the General Education Board for additional funding and training programs at Alcorn.

In addition, Weathersby served as president of the Mississippi Home Economics Association and worked with MSC President Fred T. Mitchell to develop the curriculum for a planned undergraduate program in home economics, since female enrollment was growing. Returning to a subject that had caused friction with the Parkinsons at MSCW, she also joined a summer workshop to create draft curricula on family life and sex education at MSC.

=== Marriage and return to The W ===
On October 11, 1949, Weathersby married Willis Pope, a widower and president of a local bank with one adult son. In mid-1950, Weathersby Pope left the paid workforce at her husband's behest and devoted her time to family and becoming more involved in the First Presbyterian Church and the local gardening club. In 1959, Willis died, and Weathersby Pope again returned to work for the Mississippi Department of Education. This time, she worked as a researcher, partnering with a sociologist at MSC to study the home and familial responsibilities of home economics students. Despite her marriage, she was affectionately known as "Miss Weathersby" by many.

The next year, with her report for the Department of Education complete, Weathersby Pope returned to teach home economics at The W–this time, for good. She taught traditional classes to undergraduate and graduate students as well as vocational workshops for adult learners. She taught the first racially integrated class at The W and pioneered the home economics partnership with new War on Poverty programs, such as Head Start. Many of her students were the first to complete MSCW's master's degree in home economics and went on to influence the discipline at The W and throughout the state.

Weathersby Pope retired from The W in 1974, the very year it adopted the name Mississippi University for Women.

== Death and legacy ==
Weathersby Pope died on March 28, 2007, just a month before she would have turned 102. Over the course of her life, Weathersby Pope contributed her time and talents to improving the lives of all people in her state and community. She became the first woman elected as a ruling elder from the First Presbyterian Church and held that office three times. In a testament to her impact on her alma mater, her funeral was held in Nissan Auditorium on The W campus and two MUW presidents served as honorary pallbearers.

As noted by Jolly in her work on the leaders of home economics education in Mississippi, Weathersby Pope was part of a wing of the Progressive movement that combined concerns with rural poverty and racial injustice to the convictions that 1) women's entry to public and professional life and 2) the application of science and technological innovation to everyday life would vastly improve the quality of life in America. She embodied this philosophy throughout her career. She was not a radical or revolutionary challenging the system, but she was an important reformer whose nudging resulted in incremental changes and benefited those with whom she interacted.

=== Race relations ===
In particular, Jolly points to Weathersby Pope's views on racial equality as an exemplifying her reformist politics. When she encountered racism, she worked within institutions to advance equality, pursuing social reform gradually. For example, she once encountered a white superintendent who refused to go with her to visit the rural, black school in his district. On her site visit, she found the instructor working in a run down building with almost no equipment. She went to the principal to find out why the woman was not being supported with the appropriations that the school should have been receiving from the State Department of Education. After meeting with the principal and the school board, she realized that the white superintendent was not budgeting the full share of vocational funds to the black school. She told the superintendent and the black school board members that the entire district's funding would be cut off if the classroom conditions of all schools were not improved and, seeing that the white superintendent was unimpressed, she took her concerns directly to the State Superintendent of Education. Having reported up the chain of command, though, she entrusted the situation to the State Superintendent.

Similarly, when Weathersby Pope wanted to teach a child development class to an integrated group of childcare workers for the new Head Start program, she worked with a progressive administrator at The W to offer the class at night so as to avoid attention. Integration, after all, was still a hotly contested topic and had not yet taken place at MSCW, and the Head Start program was also a target of white supremacists who despised President Lyndon Johnson's War on Poverty. When integration did occur in 1966, she taught one of the first integrated graduate classes at The W and made sure her black students got the same opportunities as whites, including personally driving them to a conference at the University of Mississippi to ensure that they reached the venue safely. Weathersby Pope and her students also pushed boundaries by eating together at a diner along the drive to Oxford and in the university cafeteria.

Reflecting on her career in 1995, Weathersby Pope continued to believe home economics could improve the quality of life for all Mississippians and noted the importance of including men and women of all races and ages in the field.

=== Women's equality ===
Weathersby Pope's role as a leader in home economics education make her an important figure in women's struggle for equality. The importance of home economics (also known as domestic science and, before that, home demonstration) to women's entrance to the paid workforce and to the quality of life in the state of Mississippi cannot be overstated. "The profession was dominated by women, led by women, and originally established for women" at a time when women were pressing for their rights and access to education. In Mississippi, the mothers of the field were, like Weathersby Pope, largely educated at The W. They formed an important network of professional women through the Mississippi Home Economics Association and supported one another in lifelong mentoring relationships.
