= Louisa Hope =

British promoter of household science teaching

- Born: 1814
- Died: 23 October 1893 (aged 78–79); Edinburgh

Louisa Octavia Augusta Hope (1814 – 23 October 1893) was a British promoter of household science teaching.

== Life ==
She was the eighth and youngest daughter of Charles Hope, Lord President of the Court of Session, and Lady Charlotte Hope. She was born in 1814 and her elder siblings included the Scottish judge John Hope, Lord Hope and the lawyer James Hope.

In 1852, Hope and others created the Scottish Ladies Association for Promoting Female Industrial Education. The intention was to ensure that females would learn sewing and, over time, other domestic subjects in separate gender-based education. The Church of Scotland had decided in 1849 that it wanted female "schools of industry". Women were seen as centers of moral and religious values for families and the middle and upper class ladies in the new association saw it as their role to provide it.

In 1853, she published her book, The Female Teacher: Ideas Suggestive of Her Qualifications and Duties where she notes that women should be "keepers at home" and men should see to his "labor and his work until the evening". Education of females would elevate the "lower classes" and this was the "aim of the Scottish Ladies Association for Promoting Female Industrial Education".

It was Hope who had organized a petition of 130 signatures of "principal ladies of Scotland" demanding improved sewing lesson for girls in Scottish schools. The petition was supported by letters sent to newspapers and this of underestimated influence. By 1861, grants were available to support this objective and in 1870, 70% of schools included sewing in their curriculum according to inspectors.

== Death and legacy ==
Upper class ladies like Hope saw it as their role to assist in these lessons and it can be seen as the start of Domestic Science being taught in schools. Hope died at her home in Edinburgh in 1893.
