= Lake Placid Conferences =

The Lake Placid Conferences (1899–1909) established home economics as a formal discipline in the United States. Following a meeting of the Lake Placid Club in 1898, trustees including Ellen Swallow Richards, Melvil Dewey, and his wife Annie Godfrey Dewey planned a formal meeting to discuss home economics issues in the United States with leaders in the field. Among the topics discussed at the first Lake Placid Conference in September 1899 were preparing women for leadership, distribution of educational bulletins, development of laboratories, teacher training in domestic science (a proposed name for home economics taught at the high school level), and kitchen gardening.

The term home economics was chosen to describe a discipline that was at college or university level, included sciences, sociology, and addressed "the necessity for trained women as leaders of public sentiment" At the fourth Lake Placid conference, a definition of home economics was determined as, "1 Home economics in its most comprehensive sense is the study of the laws, conditions, principles and ideals which are concerned on one hand with man's immediate physical environment and on the other hand with his nature as a social being, and is the study specially of the relation between those two factors; 2 In a narrow sense the term is given to the study of the empirical sciences with special reference to the practical problems of housework, cooking, etc."
