= Haskins, Ohio =

- Village
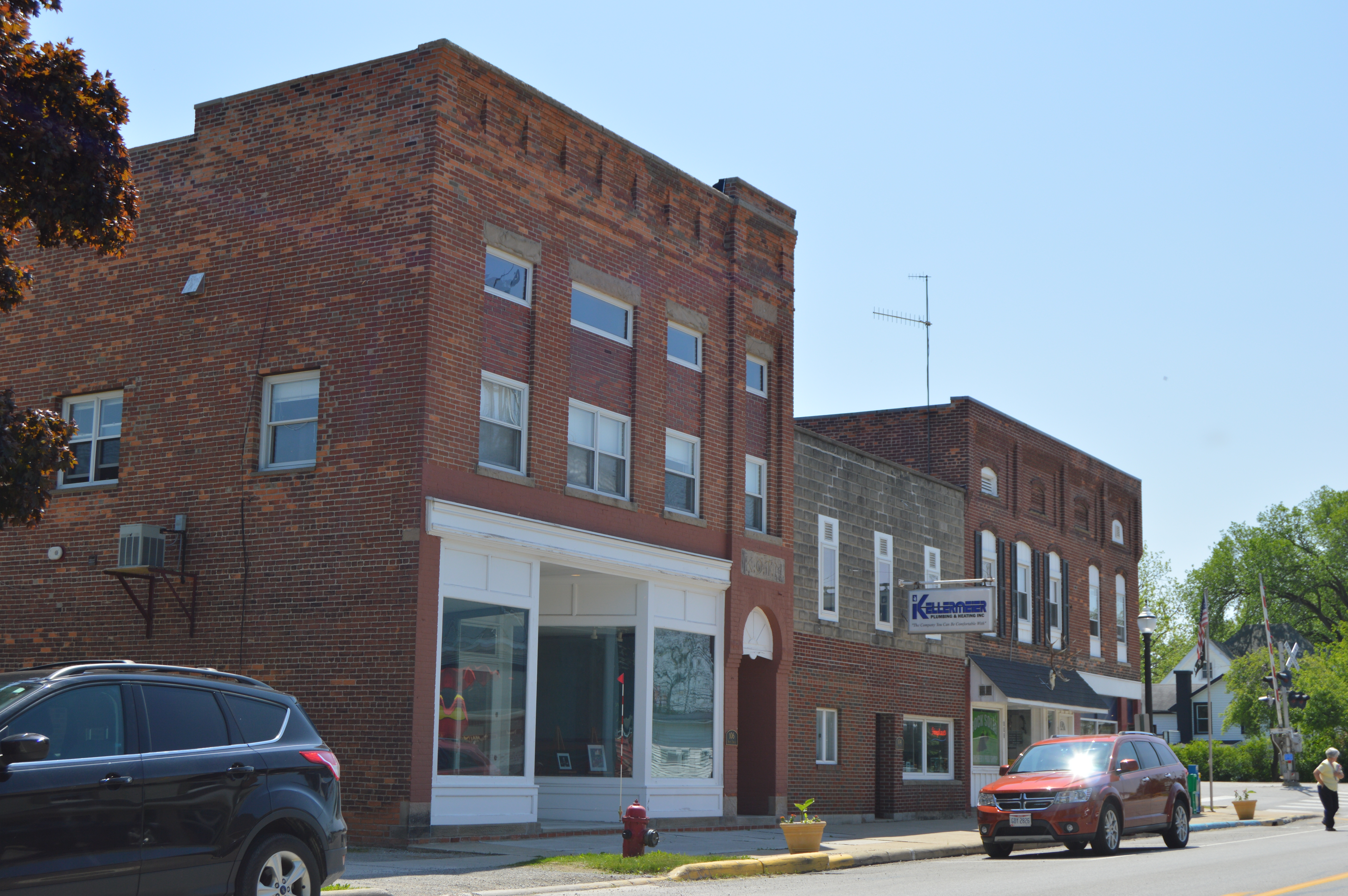
- Findlay Street downtown

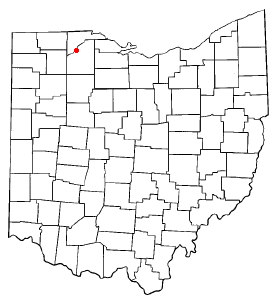
- Location of Haskins, Ohio

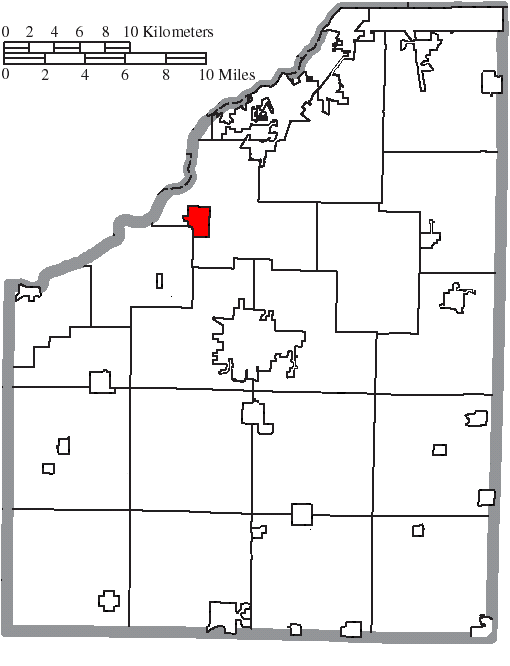
- Location of Haskins in Wood County
- Coordinates: 41°27′53″N 83°42′16″W
- Country: United States
- State: Ohio
- County: Wood
- Township: Middleton

Area
  - Total: 1.64 sq mi (4.26 km^{2})
  - Land: 1.64 sq mi (4.26 km^{2})
  - Water: 0 sq mi (0.00 km^{2})
- Elevation: 663 ft (202 m)

Population (2020)
  - Total: 1,245
  - Estimate (2023): 1,252
  - Density: 756.9/sq mi (292.24/km^{2})
- Time zone: UTC-5 (Eastern (EST))
  - Summer (DST): UTC-4 (EDT)
- ZIP code: 43525
- Area code: 419
- FIPS code: 39-34412
- GNIS feature ID: 2398265
- Website: https://haskinsvillage.org/

Haskins is a village in Wood County, Ohio, United States. The population was 1,245 at the 2020 census.

== History ==
Haskins was platted in 1862 when the railroad was extended to that point. A post office called Haskins was established in 1861. The village was incorporated in 1869.

== Geography ==
According to the United States Census Bureau, the village has a total area of 1.65 square miles (4.27 km^{2}), all land.

== Demographics ==
Historical population
Census	Pop.	Note	%±
1870	243		—
1880	381		56.8%
1890	321		−15.7%
1900	449		39.9%
1910	391		−12.9%
1920	427		9.2%
1930	466		9.1%
1940	447		−4.1%
1950	469		4.9%
1960	521		11.1%
1970	549		5.4%
1980	568		3.5%
1990	549		−3.3%
2000	638		16.2%
2010	1,188		86.2%
2020	1,245		4.8%
2023 (est.)	1,252	▲	0.6%
U.S. Decennial Census

=== 2010 census ===
As of the census of 2000, of 2010, there were 1,188 people, 409 households, and 322 families living in the village. The population density was 720.0 inhabitants per square mile (278.0/km^{2}). There were 437 housing units at an average density of 264.8 per square mile (102.2/km^{2}). The racial makeup of the village was 97.4% White, 0.4% African American, 0.3% Asian, 0.9% from other races, and 0.9% from two or more races. Hispanic or Latino of any race were 4.1% of the population.

There were 409 households, out of which 47.4% had children under the age of 18 living with them, 65.8% were married couples living together, 8.6% had a female householder with no husband present, 4.4% had a male householder with no wife present, and 21.3% were non-families. 17.6% of all households were made up of individuals, and 5.7% had someone living alone who was 65 years of age or older. The average household size was 2.90 and the average family size was 3.29.

The median age in the village was 32.3 years. 33.8% of residents were under the age of 18; 4.5% were between the ages of 18 and 24; 33.9% were from 25 to 44; 22.2% were from 45 to 64; and 5.5% were 65 years of age or older. The gender makeup of the village was 50.1% male and 49.9% female.

=== 2000 census ===
As of the census of 2000, there were 638 people, 241 households, and 169 families living in the village. The population density was 417.7 inhabitants per square mile (161.3/km^{2}). There were 251 housing units at an average density of 164.3 per square mile (63.4/km^{2}). The racial makeup of the village was 97.65% White, 0.16% African American, 0.63% Asian, 1.25% from other races, and 0.31% from two or more races. Hispanic or Latino of any race were 3.29% of the population.

There were 241 households, out of which 40.7% had children under the age of 18 living with them, 59.8% were married couples living together, 6.6% had a female householder with no husband present, and 29.5% were non-families. 25.7% of all households were made up of individuals, and 10.4% had someone living alone who was 65 years of age or older. The average household size was 2.65 and the average family size was 3.18.

In the village, the population was spread out, with 29.2% under the age of 18, 8.3% from 18 to 24, 33.5% from 25 to 44, 18.3% from 45 to 64, and 10.7% who were 65 years of age or older. The median age was 34 years. For every 100 females there were 100.6 males. For every 100 females age 18 and over, there were 104.5 males.

The median income for a household in the village was $45,625, and the median income for a family was $55,208. Males had a median income of $36,538 versus $27,500 for females. The per capita income for the village was $17,696. About 5.3% of families and 4.8% of the population were below the poverty line, including 1.6% of those under age 18 and 8.0% of those age 65 or over.

== Notable residents ==
- Hazel Stiebeling, who helped establish USDA dietary requirements, was born in Haskins.
