= John Hope, Lord Hope =

Scottish judge and landowner

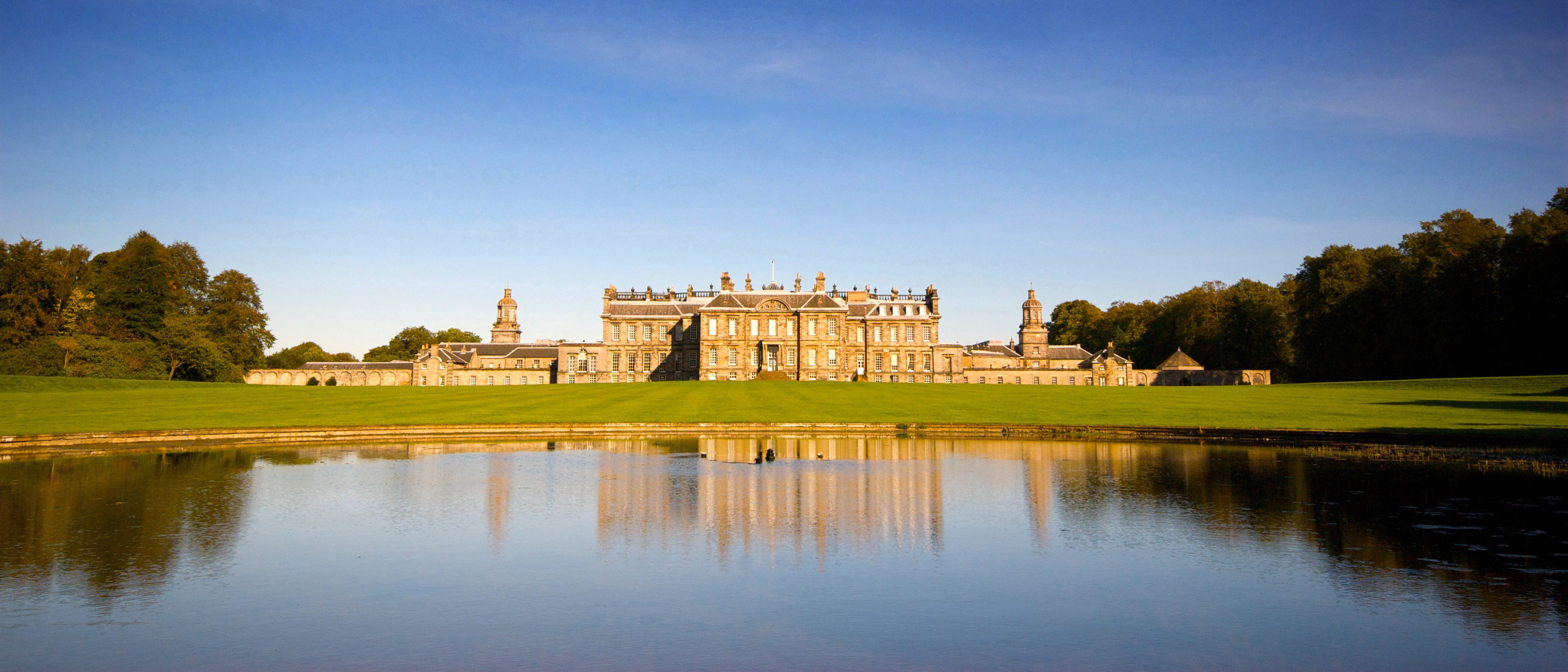
Hopetoun House and gardens

John Hope PC FRSE (1794–1858) was a Scottish judge and landowner.

== Life ==
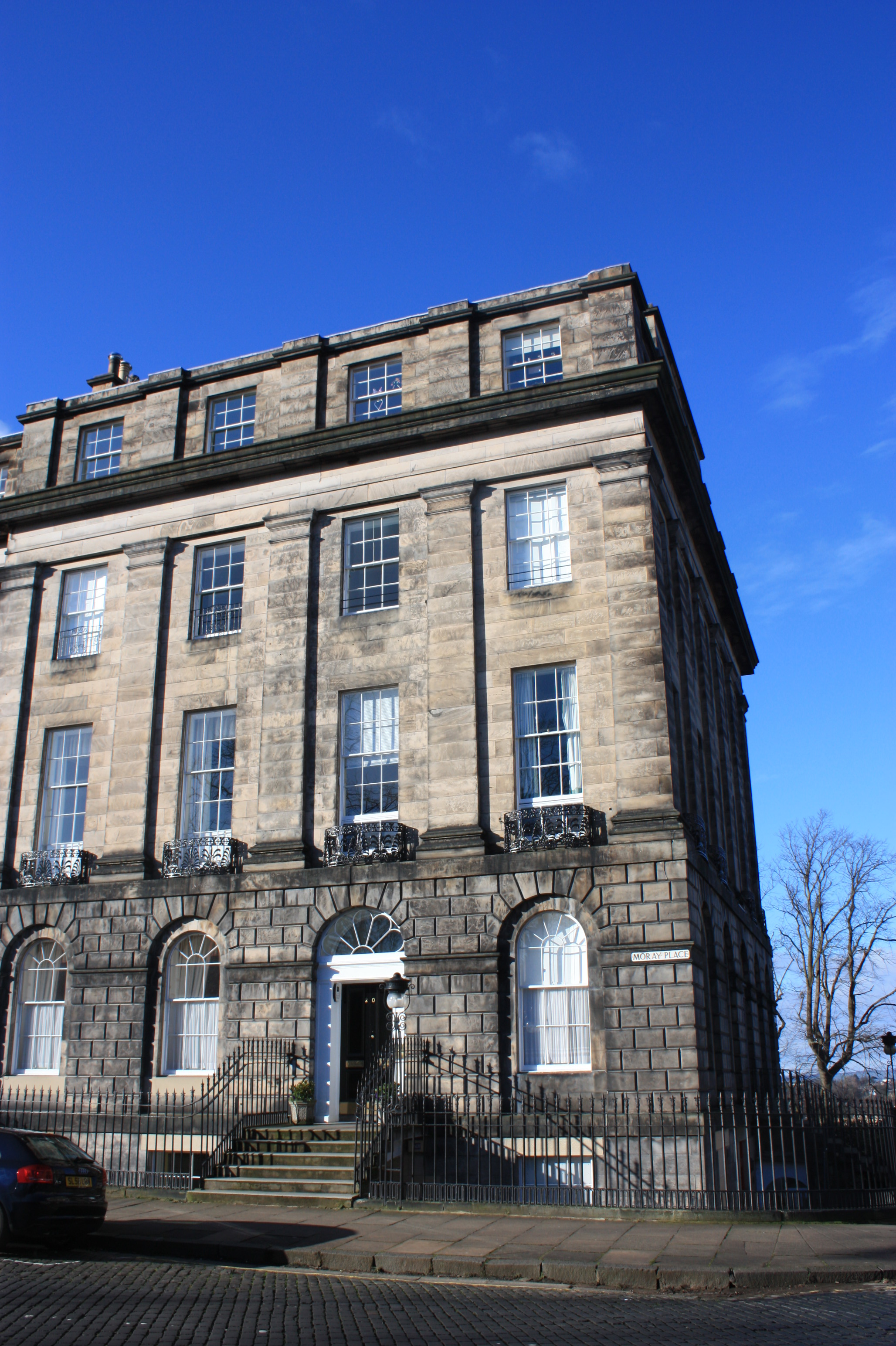
Lord Hope's magnificent townhouse at 20 Moray Place, Edinburgh

He was the eldest son of Charles Hope, Lord President of the Court of Session, and Lady Charlotte Hope, and was born on 26 May 1794. His younger sister Louisa Hope was a promoter of household science education. He received his early education at the High School of Edinburgh.

He was admitted an advocate on 23 November 1810. He was elected a Fellow of the Royal Society of Edinburgh in 1818, his proposers being Thomas Charles Hope, Thomas Allan and Alexander Gillespie.

When Rae became Lord Advocate, he was appointed one of his deputes. On 25 June 1822, James Abercromby unsuccessfully moved in the House of Commons for the appointment of a committee of inquiry into the conduct of the Lord Advocate and the other law officers of the crown in Scotland in relation to the public press. Hope sent Abercromby a letter of protest, and was summoned to attend the house. He was heard at the bar in his own defence on 17 July following (Parl. Debates, new ser. vii. 1668- 1673), but though it was unanimously agreed that he had been guilty of a breach of the privileges of the house, no further proceedings were taken in the matter.

On the death of James Wedderburn in November of the same year, Hope was appointed by Lord Liverpool Solicitor General for Scotland, a post which he held until the formation of Lord Grey's ministry in 1830, when he was succeeded by Henry Cockburn.

On 17 December 1830 Hope was elected dean of the Faculty of Advocates in the place of Francis Jeffrey, in whose favour Hope had generously waived his claims to the chair in the previous year.

In 1841 he succeeded David Boyle as Lord Justice Clerk, taking his seat on the bench as president of the second division of the court of session on 16 November 1841, and on 17 April 1844 was sworn a member of the Privy Council. Hope presided over the second division of the civil court, as well as at nearly all trials of importance which took place in the High Court of Justiciary during his seventeen years of office.

On 22 March 1847 Lord Hope sentenced Angus Davidson, Daniel Sutherland and John Main to be deported to Australia for seven years for their parts in the food riots in Burghead in January of that year. On 31 May he sentenced shoemaker James Nicholson to transportation for ten years for his part in the unrest in Pulteneytown on 24 February. These harsh sentences attracted widespread criticism and were subsequently commuted to much shorter terms of imprisonment by the Home Secretary, Sir George Grey

Lord Hope died at home, 20 Moray Place, Edinburgh, on 14 June 1858. from a sudden attack of paralysis, and was buried at Ormiston, near Tranent.

In comparing the English with the Scottish bar, Cockburn makes the following allusion to Hope's style of advocacy at the bar: "I heard no voice strained, and did not see a drop of sweat at the bar in these eight days. Our high-pressure dean screams and gesticulates and perspires more in any forenoon than the whole bar of England (I say nothing of Ireland) in a reign" (Memorials of his Time, i.114). Sir Walter Scott had a very high opinion of him (Lockhart, Life of Scott, 1845, p. 587).

== Family ==
In August 1825 he married Jessie Scott Irving, daughter of Thomas Irving of Shetland, by whom he had several children. His widow survived him, and died in Royal Terrace, Edinburgh, on 26 January 1872, aged 79. His only daughter, Charlotte, died in Malta, 3 November 1853, aged 24. She was buried in Floriana and her grave is still visible at the Msida Bastion Historic Garden.

== Artistic recognition ==
There was a portrait of him by Colvin Smith, R.S.A., made when he was Dean of Faculty, in the National Gallery of Scotland (Catalogue No. 67). There were also portraits of Hope in the Parliament House and in the Scottish National Portrait Gallery.

== In popular culture ==
Hope was portrayed by David McKail in the Granada Television series Lady Killers, in an episode depicting the trial of Madeleine Smith.

Legal offices
Preceded by James Wedderburn	Solicitor General for Scotland; 1822–1830	Succeeded by Henry Cockburn
Preceded by Lord Boyle	Lord Justice Clerk; 1841–1858	Succeeded by Lord Glencorse
