= Aunt Sammy =

Radio character

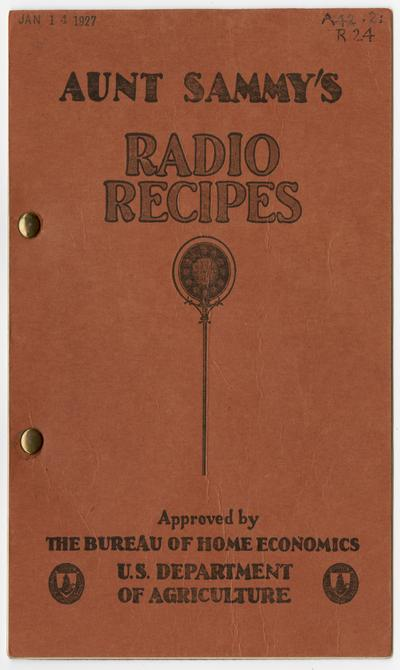
- 1927 cookbook of Aunt Sammy’s recipes
- Country of origin: United States
- Language: English
- Created by: Bureau of Home Economics
- Original release: October 4, 1926 – 1934

Aunt Sammy was a fictional character created by the Bureau of Home Economics of the U.S. Department of Agriculture, for a popular radio show called Housekeepers' Chat. Its target audience was farm wives.

The fifteen-minute radio program was first broadcast on October 4, 1926, and by 1932, 194 stations carried it. Though the government-sponsored series lasted until 1946, the Aunt Sammy character was not used after 1934.

== Housekeepers' Chat ==
Aunt Sammy was the wife of Uncle Sam. Other family members and friends included Ebenezer, an uncle; Billy, a nephew; Percy DeWillington, a fussy eater, and the Nosy Neighbor.

In 1927, three women at the USDA collaborated to prepare content for each episode. Fanny Walker Yeatman tested recipes and conducted research on foods; Josephine Hemphill wrote the chatty portions; Ruth Van Deman coordinated the menus and recipes.

Each fifteen-minute episode was divided into three five-minute sections. "Backyard Gossip" might discuss nutrition, health, clothing, gardening, home life or social activities. "Questions Women are Asking" would answer an actual question sent to Aunt Sammy, but only if the answer would be of general interest. "What Shall We Have for Dinner?" gave ingredients and instructions for preparing well-balanced, easily prepared, and inexpensive menus.

Every radio station broadcasting the series had its own Aunt Sammy, each using a standardized script. The performers were selected to emulate local accents and speech patterns. The book Engines of Our Ingenuity stated: "Aunt Sammy wasn’t the voice of a single woman, but hundreds of women working from scripts at their respective radio stations. Her persona talked about clothing, furniture, appliances — all sprinkled with world affairs. But her most enduring legacy derived from what she had to say about food. The USDA received so many requests for Aunt Sammy’s recipes that they were published in a pamphlet. It was an immediate hit — so popular that the USDA printed revised and expanded versions three times in just five years." The show included jokes, commentary on the news and household advice, but its main focus was to help rural women prepare nutritious meals based on simple recipes. Letters from listeners — more than 25,000 in four months — helped to determine the programs' content.

Morse Salisbury, who was chief of the radio service fee for the USDA, was responsible for the friendly, chatty style of the Aunt Sammy character. According to Salisbury, "The first injunction laid upon the radio speaker is to be entertaining and natural and friendly". Sammy would comment on current events, such as the 1926 visit of Queen Marie of Romania to the United States, which took place shortly after the show premiered. "Queen Marie of Rumania is visiting my town this week," said Aunt Sammy. "She didn't come to America especially to see me, but I thought she might drop in to discuss household problems. I have a new recipe, called Peach Dainty, that I've been saving for her. I am sure the King would like it, and the Prince and Princess, too."

In 1931, Aunt Sammy instructed listeners in authentic traditional Chinese cooking techniques, helping to improve the quality of Chinese-American food prepared by home cooks.

During the Great Depression the Aunt Sammy character stopped being used, and the radio program, renamed Homemaker Chats became "drier and more factual". The series was discontinued in 1946.

== Cookbooks ==
Aunt Sammy's Radio Record (September 1928)

In 1927, a cookbook called Aunt Sammy's Radio Recipes was published. As demand increased, the recipe book grew from a loose-leaf format to a bound volume. By 1928, 205,000 copies of the book had been sent to listeners. The first cookbook published in braille was a 1932 edition of Aunt Sammy's book. By 1931, when Aunt Sammy's Radio Recipes Revised was printed, the cookbook had been enlarged and improved four times.

Aunt Sammy promoted the cookbook on the air. "By the way, some of you have begun to listen in quite recently. You may not have copies of the loose-leaf Radio Cook Book Uncle Sam is sending to homemakers. I want to give Uncle Sam all the credit due him, but the cookbook was not his idea at all. After he saw how neat it was, and how easily extra pages could be added, he waxed enthusiastic — he really did. His only regret was that he didn't originate the idea himself. Isn't that just like a man?"

For the 1928–1929 radio season, the recipe book was supplemented by Aunt Sammy's Radio Record, a 48-page book that offered information on how to provide balanced meals and how to set a table. It also contained pages on which listeners could write down menus and recipes that were given on the air.

In 1976, in honor of the 50th anniversary of the first Housekeeper's Chat radio broadcast, the U.S. Department of Printing Office published Selections From Aunt Sammy's Radio Recipes and USDA Favorites, a 24 page booklet consisting of a brief biography of Aunt Sammy, and recipes from both the 1920s and 1976.
