= Bureau of Home Economics =

Federal organization for home economics in the United States

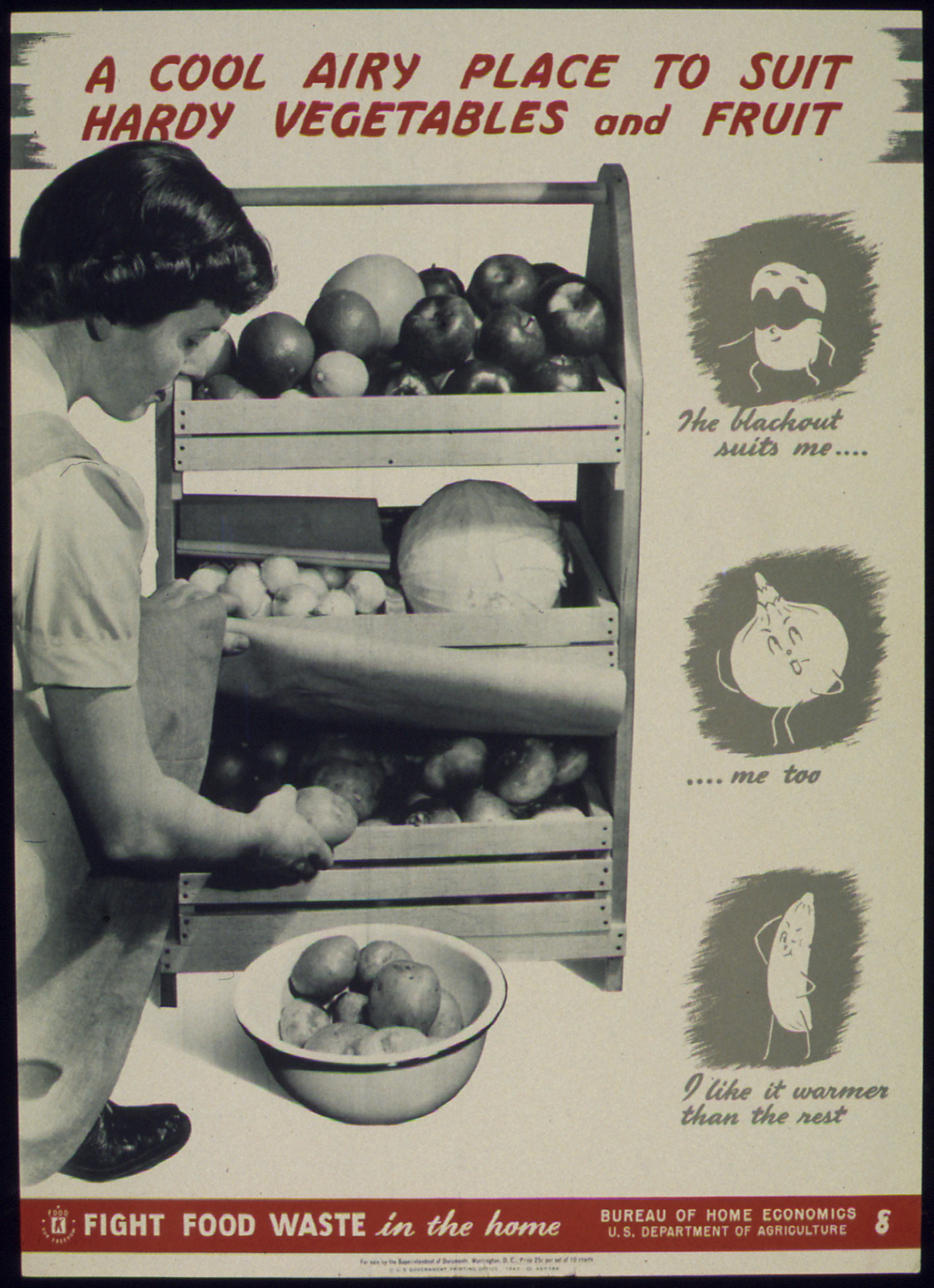
Bureau of Home Economics poster promoting the fight against food waste in the home during World War II

The Bureau of Home Economics, later known as the Bureau of Human Nutrition and Home Economics, was a division of the US Department of Agriculture that supported homemaker activities in the early 20th century. The bureau developed recipes, collected information from the burgeoning scientific practice of nutrition, published sewing patterns for homemade clothing, produced radio content like the Aunt Sammy personality, wrote articles for newspapers and magazines, and generally contributed to the adoption of scientific practices in routine household activities. Operating between 1923 and 1962, the bureau supported homemakers through the Great Depression and World War II.

== History and leadership ==
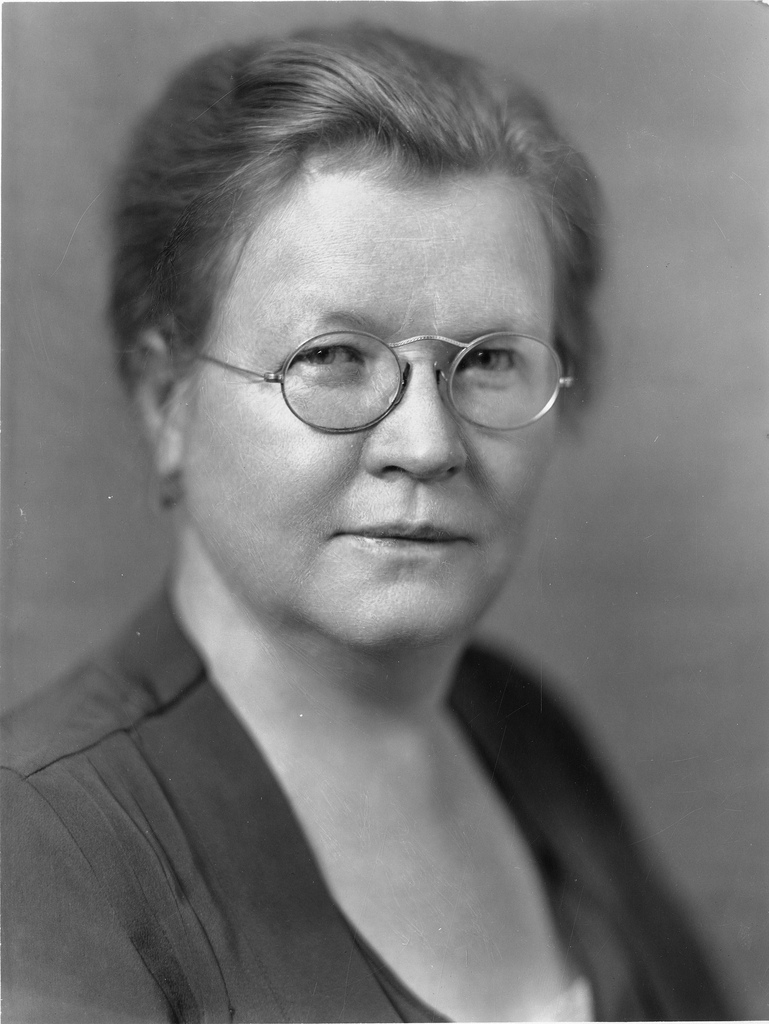
Louise Stanley was the first head of the USDA Bureau of Home Economics when she was appointed in 1923.

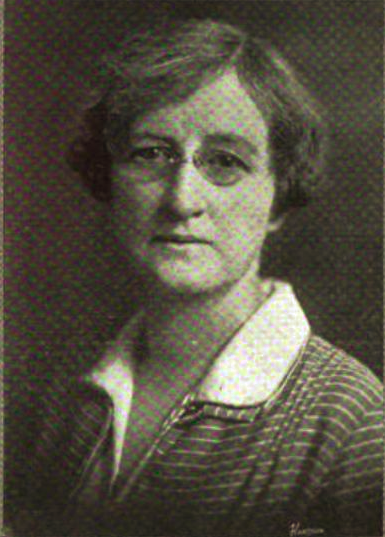
Helen B. Thompson helped organized the Bureau

The bureau has its roots in the Office of Home Economics at the USDA. Established in 1915, the office centralized USDA existing efforts around cooking and nutrition and other home economics topics, and was tasked with disseminating "practical applications of research knowledge" from the USDA. World War I had redirected many essential foods to the war front, so the government guided homemakers on shopping for and cooking alternative foods. Following the war, the office was promoted to a bureau of seven employees in 1923 and placed under the leadership of Louise Stanley, PhD, a professor of home economics with degrees from Peabody College, Columbia University, and Yale University. The bureau was the largest employer of women scientists in the country. Its efforts were focused in three areas which formed its major departments: Clothing and Textiles, Economics of the Home, and Food and Nutrition.

During World War II, it was renamed the Bureau of Human Nutrition and Home Economics.

== Economics of the Home ==
Among the projects in the Economics of the Home department, modern kitchen design and efficiency figured prominently. Since the early 1920s, the USDA studied how homemakers moved through their days and spent their time by equipping women with pedometers and having them keep time-use diaries. The Bureau continued the studies, examining "various household tasks including cooking, washing, and child care". These studies produced publications like Convenient Kitchens, a detailed bulletin with specifics about kitchen layout, work surfaces, equipment and food storage, ventilation, and lighting.

== Food and nutrition ==
With its roots reaching back to home-front conservation during World War I, the bureau was positioned to tackle the strains of the Great Depression early in its history. Publications targeted families struggling to shop and cook with little or no money. Adequate Diets for People of Limited Income, Diets at Four Levels of Nutritive Content, Diets to Fit the Family Income and similar bulletins provided strategies and recipes to sustain a family on a short budget using cheaper ingredients that were as nutritious as more expensive ones. The bureau tracked and disseminated information from the developing science of nutrition. Scientists were discovering and classifying nutrients like Vitamins A, B and C, and the bureau created recipes to diversify diets. The bureau's charismatic vehicle for this knowledge was Aunt Sammy. A domestic, homemaking counterpart to Uncle Sam, Aunt Sammy was the front face of many of the bureau's extension efforts. Aunt Sammy hosted Housekeepers' Chat, a program sent to local radio stations nationwide to be read by local women. These recipes were later collected into Radio Recipes in order "to meet the enormous demand for printed copies of the most popular recipes broadcast from October, 1926, to June, 1927."

== See also ==
- USDA Home and Garden Bulletin
