= USDA Home and Garden Bulletin =

Logo of the U.S. Department of Agriculture

USDA Home and Garden Bulletin Issue 107, detailing how to mend clothing.

The USDA Home and Garden Bulletin was a series of publications released by the United States Department of Agriculture from 1951 to 2003, totaling 267 issues. These bulletins would contain information on various subjects such as budgeting, canning and jarring foods, or nutrition. The bulletins sold for between 10 and 75 cents an issue. Although all issues were published by the USDA, often issues would be prepared and produced by smaller groups within the department, such as the Human Nutrition Research Division, Office of Information, or the Consumer and Food Economics Research Division.

Some issues of the bulletin would be repurposed or adapted in the future as educational materials.

== History ==
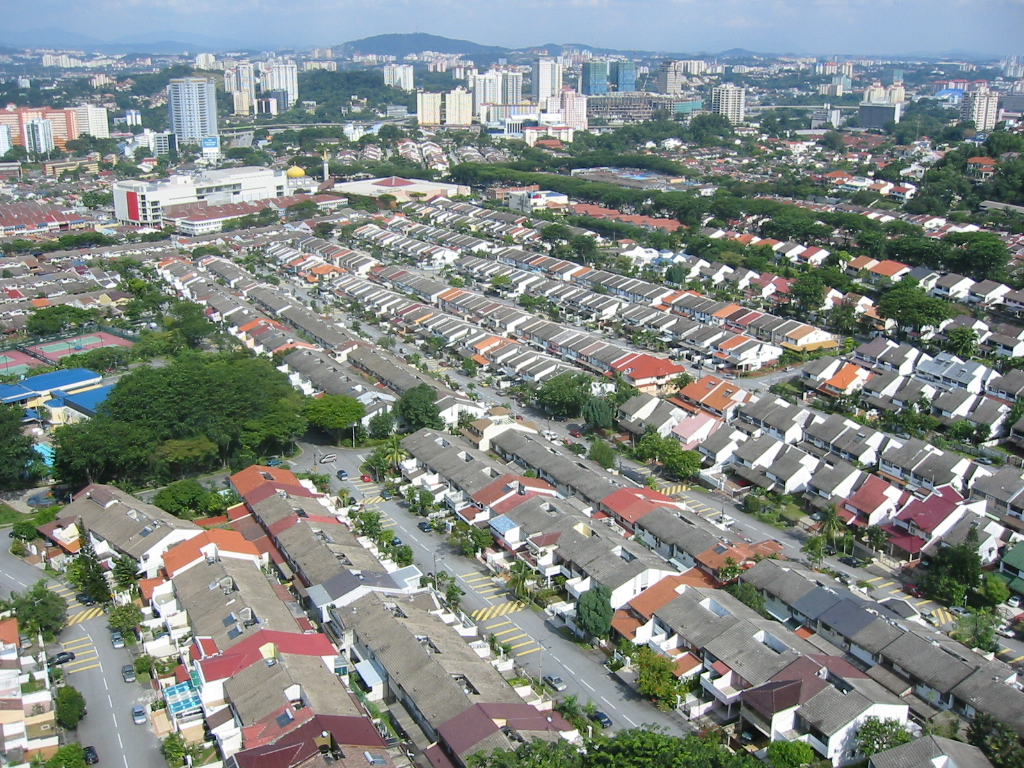
An example of suburbs, gaining in popularity over farms

The Home and Garden Bulletin was created to "present in a popular style information on home and garden subjects". and was often deemed a "consumer service". Available via mail order, it was also seen as a way to spread information to rural areas. After over 50 years of continuous publications, the service ended in 2003. The reasons for this vary, but a large factor is urbanization, which has led to less family farms. Another cause is the rise of the internet, which has arguably connected rural communities better without depending on the government. Many topics covered in the bulletin were taken up by other divisions of the USDA after new publications stopped, such as the National Institute of Food and Agriculture.
