= Louise Stanley (home economist) =

American chemist and home economist (1883–1954)

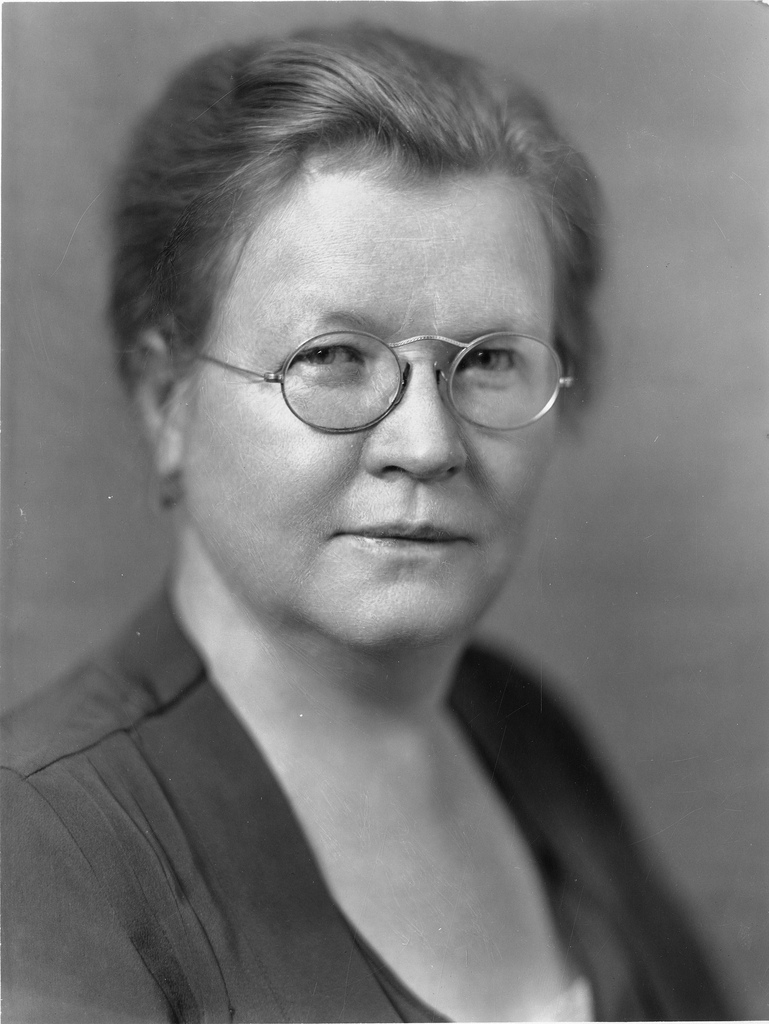
- Louise Stanley
- Born: June 8, 1883; Nashville, Tennessee, U.S.
- Died: July 15, 1954 (age 71); Washington, D.C., U.S.
- Occupations: Chemist, home economist, government official
- Known for: First head of the U.S. Bureau of Home Economics

Louise Ellen Stanley (June 8, 1883 – July 15, 1954) was an American chemist and home economist. After an academic career teaching at the University of Missouri from 1907 to 1923, she was the first head of the Bureau of Home Economics, a federal office within the United States Department of Agriculture, from 1923 to 1943. She was inducted into the National Agricultural Hall of Fame.

== Early life and education ==
Stanley was born in Nashville, Tennessee, the daughter of Gustavus A. Stanley and Eliza Monroe Winston Stanley. Her father was born in Maine, and was a judge in Florida and a Union Army veteran of the American Civil War. He died in 1884, when Louise Stanley was still a baby.

Stanley graduated from Peabody College in Nashville in 1903, and earned a bachelor's degree in education from the University of Chicago in 1906. She earned a master's degree from Columbia University in 1907. She completed doctoral studies in biochemistry at Yale University in 1911, with Lafayette Mendel as her advisor.

== Career ==
Stanley taught home economics at the University of Missouri from 1907 to 1923. She was also chair of the Missouri Association of Household Arts and Science. She was a delegate to the International Congress for the Teaching of Household Economy, held in Belgium in 1913.

Stanley was the first head of the Bureau of Home Economics, in office from 1923 to 1943. She participated in a White House conference on child health and protection, convened by Herbert Hoover in 1930, and led efforts to advise American families on nutrition in the early years of the Great Depression. She worked especially for product labeling and industrial standards for fabrics, foods, and other home goods. In 1938, she was "the highest ranking woman scientist in the federal government", and she hired other women scientists for the bureau's work. From 1943 to 1950 she worked in the Agricultural Research Administration, studying diet, nutrition, and foods in Latin America. After 1950, she serve as a consultant to the Office of Foreign Agricultural Relations.

Stanley was the first woman to receive an honorary doctorate from the University of Missouri, in 1940. In 1953, the American Home Economics Association established the Louise Stanley Latin American Scholarship in her honor.

== Publications ==
Many of Stanley's publications were government reports and instructional booklets, but she also co-wrote a textbook, The Home and the Child (1931) and published articles in a wide range of academic and professional journals, including Journal of Industrial & Engineering Chemistry, School Science and Mathematics, Journal of Home Economics, Agricultural Engineering, The Woman Citizen, Childhood Education, The Annals of the American Academy of Political and Social Science, The Scientific Monthly, Extension Service Review, US Egg and Poultry Magazine, and Journal of Health and Physical Education.

- "Phosphorus in Flesh" (1910, with P. F. Trowbridge)
- The Preservation of Food in the Home (1914, booklet, with May C. McDonald)
- "Project Teaching in Home Economics Courses" (1915)
- A First-year Course in Home Economics for Southern Agricultural Schools (1917, booklet)
- "Plans for the Bureau of Home Economics" (1923)
- "The Development of Better Farm Homes" (1926)
- "Opening Doors" (1926)
- Canning Fruits and Vegetables at Home (1926, booklet)
- "The Place of Nutrition in Childhood Education" (1928)
- "Home-Making Education in the Colleges" (1929)
- Reindeer Recipes (1929, booklet, with Fanny Walker Yeatman)
- Ice Creams Frozen without Stirring (1930, booklet)
- The Home and the Child (1931, textbook, with Martha Van Rensselaer and Lita Bane)
- "Home Economics Research by the Federal Government" (1933)
- "The Bureau of Home Economics and the Extension Service" (1933)
- "The Bureau of Home Economics Studies Eggs and Poultry" (1934)
- "Home Economics and Rural Electrification" (1936)
- "Health Education Activities of the Government: Departments of Labor and Agriculture" (1942, with Muriel F. Bliss, Marjorie M. Heseltine, Nina B. Lamkin, Ethel Mealey, and Lucy Morgan)
- Home Canning of Fruits, Vegetables and Meats (1942, booklet, with Mabel C. Stienbarger and Dorothy E. Shank)
- "Soldiers of the Kitchen Front" (1942, New York Times)

== Personal life and legacy ==
Stanley adopted a daughter, Nancy, in 1929. Stanley died from cancer in 1954, at the age of 71, in Washington, D.C. The University of Missouri named a new home economics building for Stanley in 1963. In 1984, she was inducted into the National Agricultural Hall of Fame. There is a folder of materials related to Stanley in the State Historical Society of Missouri manuscript collection.
