= Home economics =

Study of household management

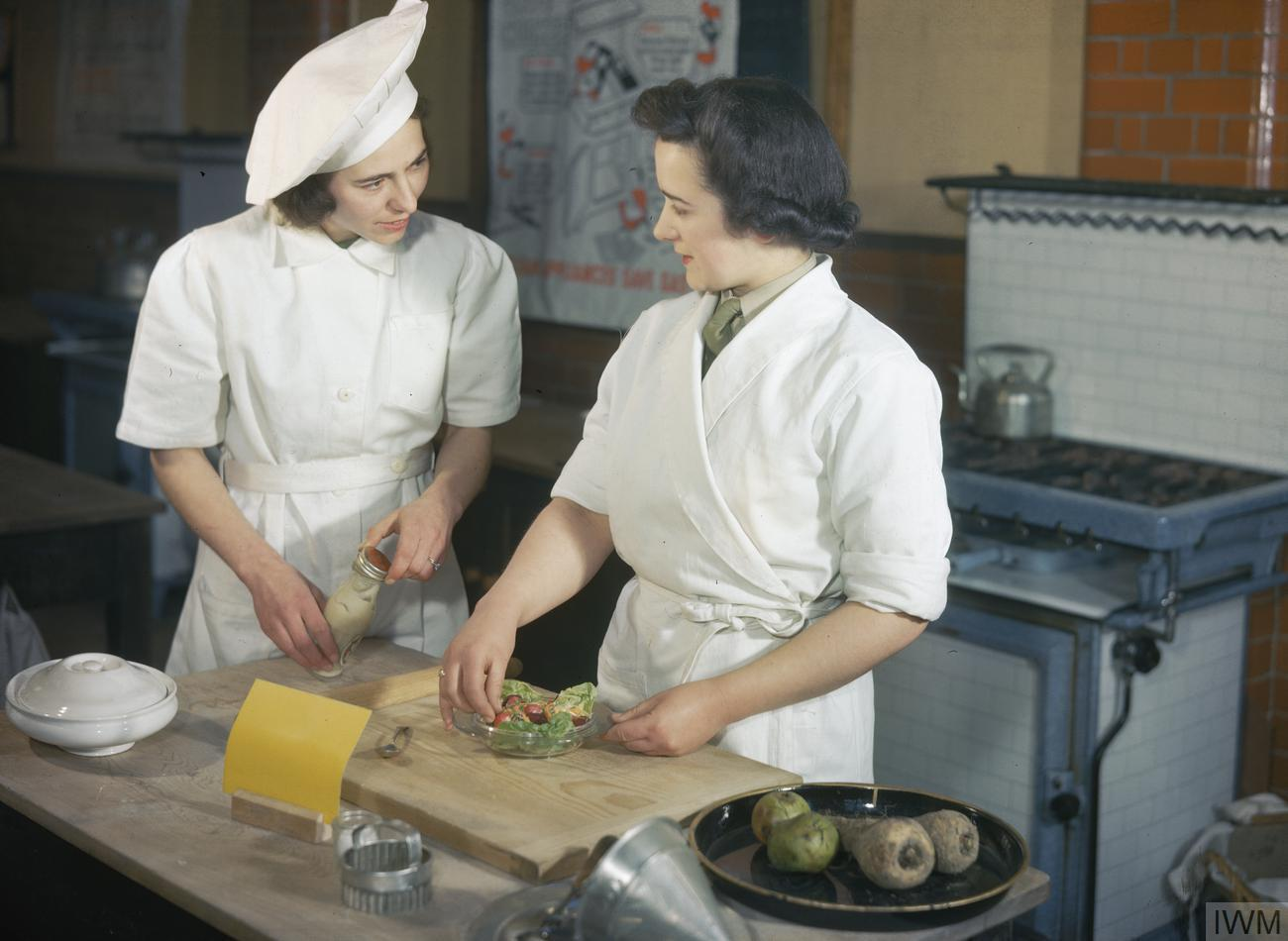
A domestic science course being taught in London during World War II

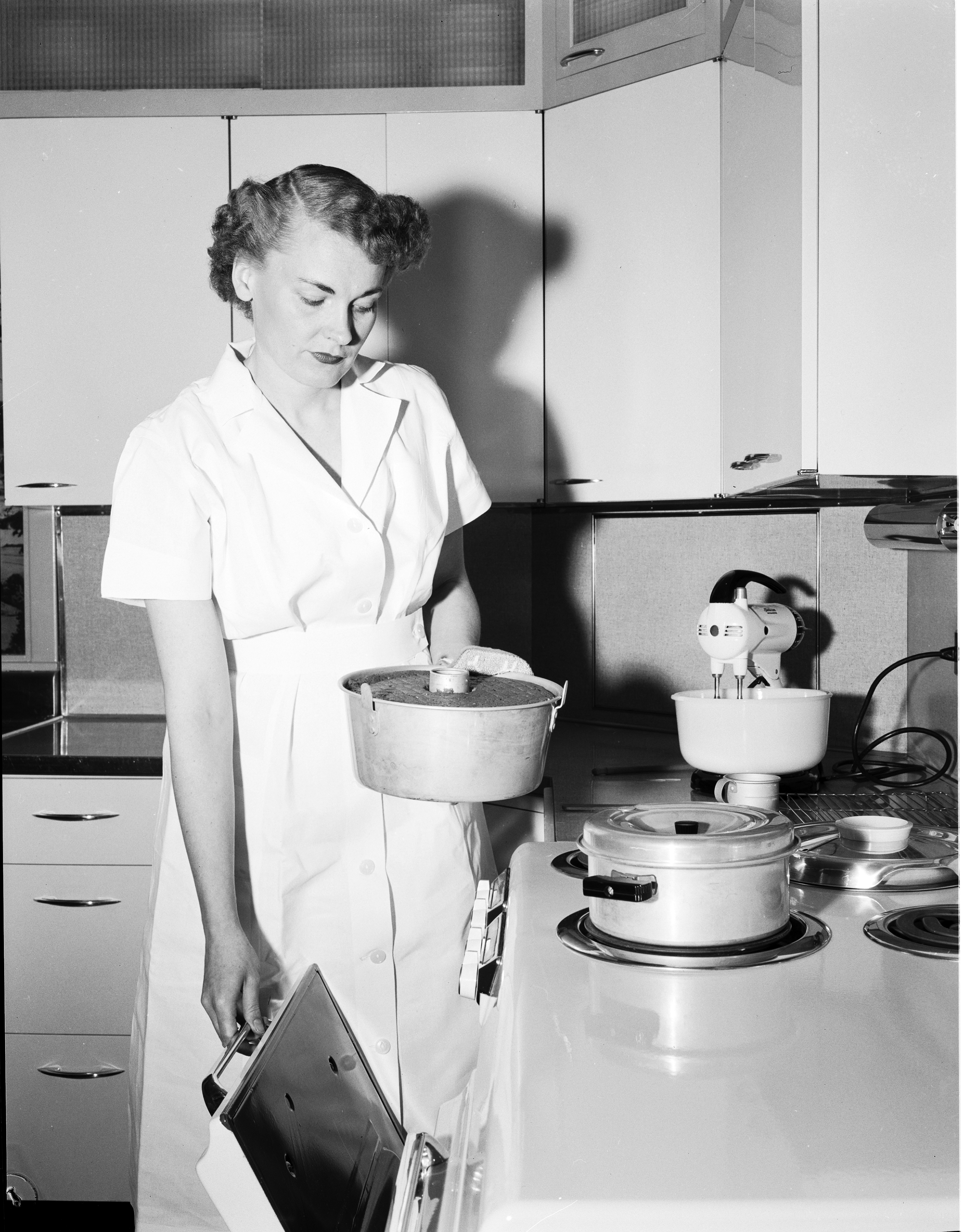
A home economics instructor giving a demonstration, Seattle, 1953

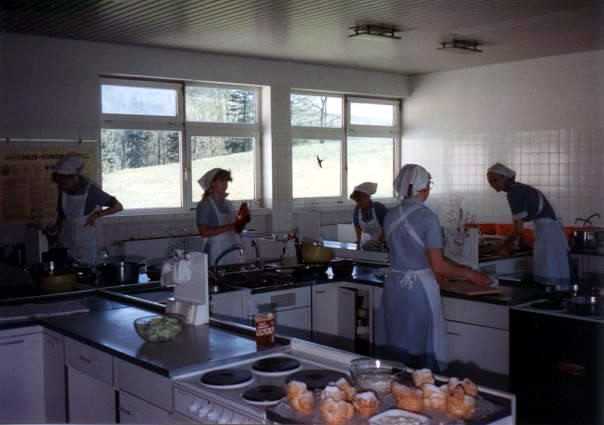
A training class in 1985 at Wittgenstein Reifenstein schools

Home economics, also called food technology, food tech, home ec, domestic science, household arts, homemaking or family and consumer sciences (often shortened to FCS or FACS), is a subject concerning human development, personal and family finances, consumer issues, housing and interior design, nutrition and food preparation, as well as textiles and apparel. Although historically mostly taught in secondary school or high school, dedicated home economics courses are much less common today. Home economics overlaps with the concept of life skills-based education.

Home economics courses are offered around the world and across multiple educational levels. Historically, the purpose of these courses was to professionalize housework, to provide intellectual fulfillment for women, to emphasize the value of "women's work" in society, and to prepare them for the traditional gender roles. Family and consumer sciences are taught as an elective or required course in secondary education, as a continuing education course in institutions, and at the primary level.

Beginning in Scotland in the 1850s, it was a woman-dominated course, teaching women to be homemakers with sewing being the lead skill. The American Association of Family and Consumer Sciences at the beginning of the 20th century saw Americans desiring youth to learn vocational skills as well. Politics played a role in home economics education, and it wasn't until later in the century that the course shifted from being woman-dominated to now required for both sexes.

Now family and consumer science have been included in the broader subject of Career Technical Education, a program that teaches skilled trades, applied sciences, modern technologies, and career preparation. Despite the widening of the subject matter over the past century, there has been a major decline in home economics courses offered by educational institutions.

Domestic science kitchen, YWCA, Minneapolis, Minnesota

== Terminology ==
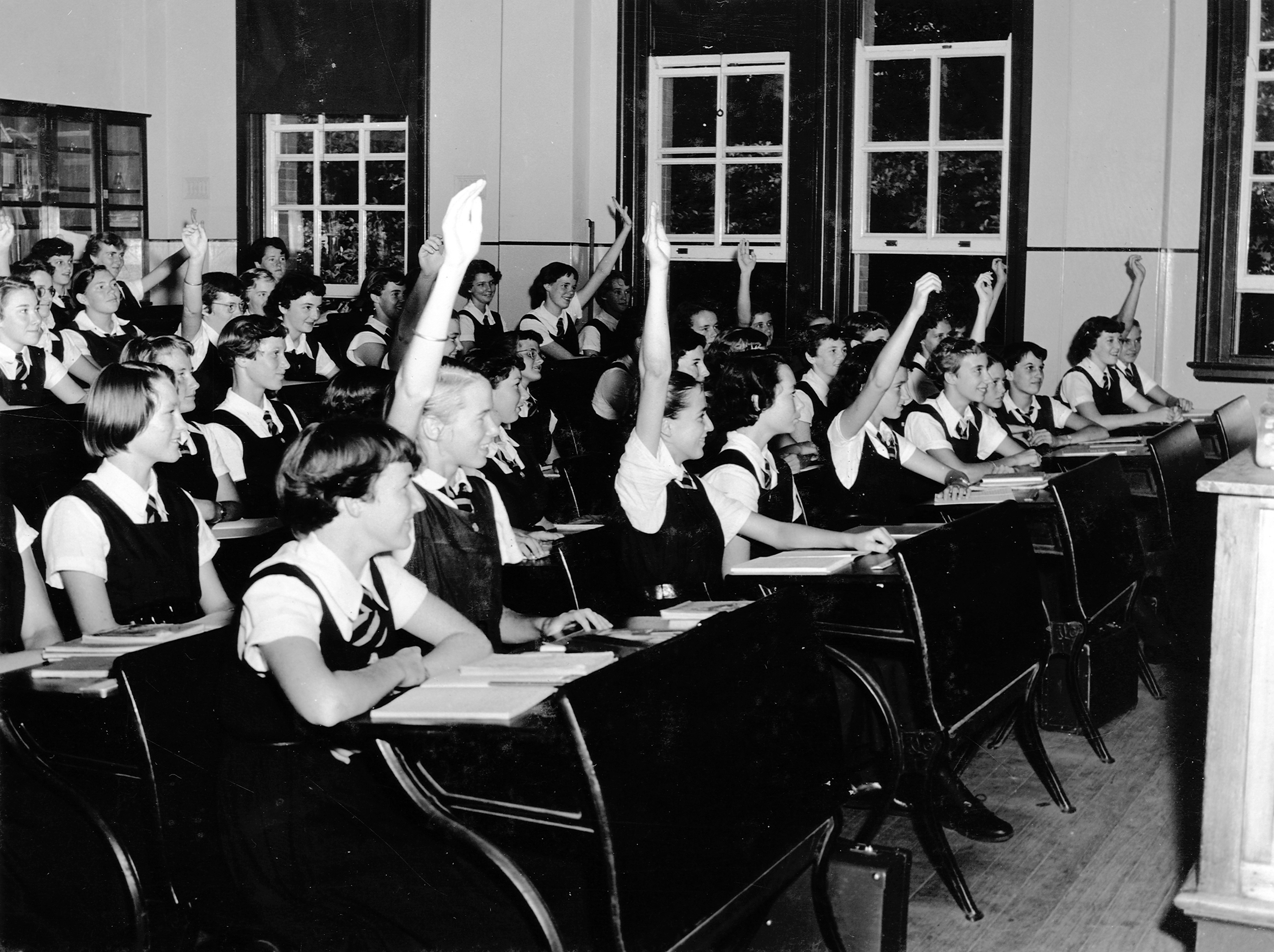
A group of students studying home science theory at Newmarket State High School

Family and consumer sciences were previously known in the United States as home economics, often abbreviated as "home ec" or "HE". In 1994, various organizations, including the American Association of Family and Consumer Sciences, adopted the new term "Family and Consumer Sciences (FCS)" to reflect the fact that the field covers aspects outside of home life and wellness. FCS is taught worldwide, as an elective or a required course in secondary education, and in many tertiary and continuing education institutions. Sometimes it is also taught in primary education. International cooperation in the field is coordinated by the International Federation for Home Economics, established in 1908.

These programs have been called human sciences, home science, domestic economy, and the domestic arts, the domestic sciences, or the domestic arts and sciences, and may still be referred to as such depending on the academic institution. Home economics has a strong historic relationship to the field of human ecology, and since the 1960s a number of university-level home economics programs have been renamed "human ecology" programs, including Cornell University's program.

== By country ==
Internationally, Home Economics education is coordinated by the International Federation for Home Economics (Fédération internationale pour l'économie familiale).

=== Canada ===
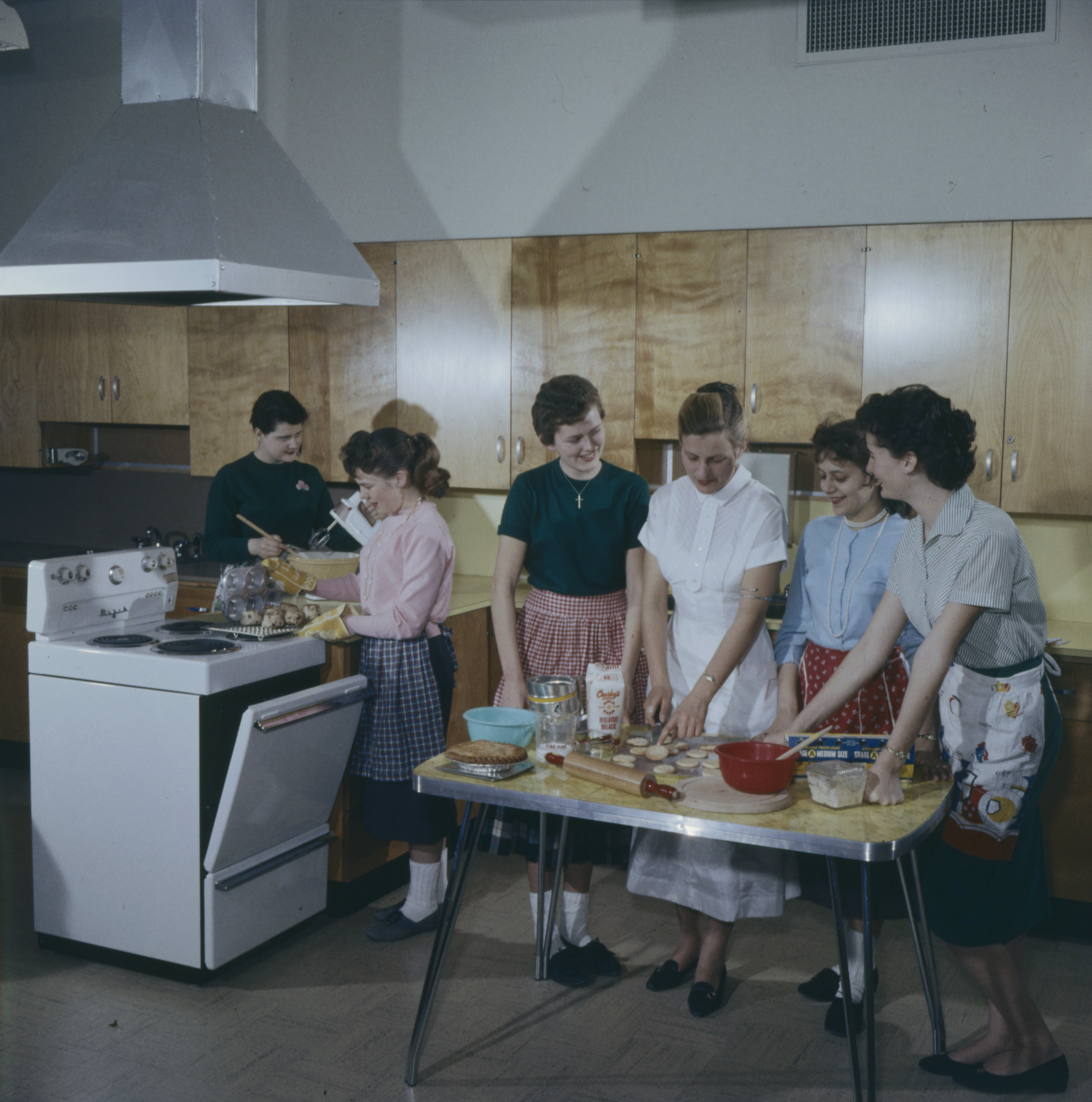
Home economics class in Ottawa, Canada, 1959

In the majority of elementary (K-6) and public (K-8) schools in Canada, home economics is not taught. General health education is provided as part of a physical education class. In high schools or secondary schools, there is no specific home economics course, but students may choose related courses to take, such as Family Studies, Food and Nutrition, or Health and Safety.

=== Finland ===
Finland has a 110-year history in home economics teacher education. Household economics and nutrition have been taught at university level since the 1940s. Finland has made home economics a required course for boys and girls. When at university, home economics courses fall under categories of the culture and education of nutrition and food, consumer education, environmental education, and family education. The Finnish National Core Curriculum for Basic Education in 2014 also states to reach sustainable development, home economics must be one of the key elements throughout curriculum.

=== Germany ===
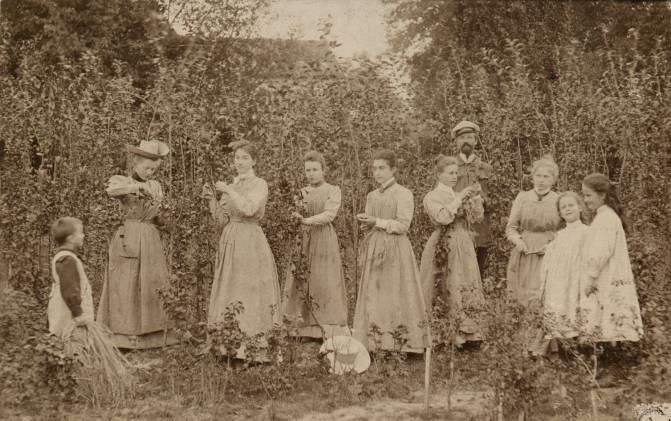
Gardening in Ofleiden, 1898

Between 1880 and 1900, the Reifenstein schools concept was initiated by Ida von Kortzfleisch, a Prussian noble woman and early German feminist. Reifenstein refers to Reifenstein im Eichsfeld, a municipality in Thuringia and site of the first permanent school. Reifensteiner Verband comprised from 1897 till 1990 about 15 own schools and cooperated with further operators. About 40 wirtschaftliche Frauenschulen, rural economist women schools were connected to the Reifensteiner concept and movement and allowed higher education for women already in the German Kaiserreich. The 1913 doctorate of Johannes Kramer compared different concepts of home economic education worldwide and praised the system e.g. in Iowa. Additionally, home economics are taught as an optional course in lower- and mid-level secondary schools (Haupt- und Realschule).

=== India ===
Many education boards in India such as NIOS, CBSE, ICSE, CISCE and various state boards offer home science as a subject in their courses, sometimes called Human Ecology and Family Sciences.

=== Indonesia ===
Home economics are known in Indonesia as Family Training and Welfare (Indonesian: Pembinaan dan Kesejahteraan Keluarga, PKK). It is rooted on a 1957 conference on home economics held in Bogor; it became state policy in 1972.

=== Iran ===
The new books are Family management and planning lifestyle for girls in secondary high schools and a similar book for boys just as well.

=== Ireland ===
Home economics was taught to girls in the junior cycle of secondary school in the 20th century. It was added to the senior cycle Leaving Certificate in 1971, at a time when elimination of school fees was increasing participation. In subsequent decades new co-educational community schools saw more boys studying the subject. Increased third-level education participation from the 1990s saw a decline in practical subjects not favoured for third-level entry requirements, including home economics.

Percentage of Leaving Cert students sitting the Home Economics exam
Year	1971	1981	2004	2016
Girls %	39	59	50	29
Boys %	0.2	6.3	7.3	2.5

=== Italy ===
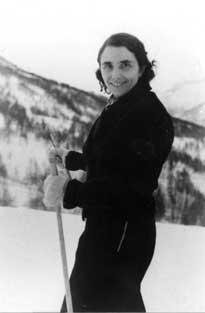
Ada Gobetti (1902–1968)

In 1945, just days before the Liberation of World War II, Ada Gobetti stated, "The most difficult problem will be that of the housewife. It will be one of the most difficult to resolve if one wants to create a new society." She wanted women, family, work, and society to form a new relationship through education and organization of the housewives. Although people were not taught formal classes of home economics, during the 1950s and 1960s home economics manuals had been fully published. These manuals were compulsory for children to read in school. These manuals focused heavily on how to be a good housewife during a new era of transformation and how to adapt to new behaviors and habits.

Starting from the Gentile reform of 1923, home economics was taught in the lower middle school and in the new unified middle school established in 1963. The name changed to Technical Applications, differentiated into male and female, which was taught until 1977 when it changed to the title of Technical Education, which no longer differed in relation to the sex of the pupils.

=== South Korea ===
In South Korea, the field is most commonly known as "consumer science" (소비자학, sobija-hak). The field began in schools taught by Western missionaries in the late 19th century. The first college-level department of family science was established at Ewha Womans University in Seoul in 1929.

=== Sweden ===
In Sweden, Home economics is commonly known as "home- and consumer studies" (hem- och konsumentkunskap). The subject is mandatory from middle years until high school in both public and private schools but is regarded as one of the smallest subjects in the Swedish school system. For many decades, the subject was only called "hemkunskap" and had a strong focus on the traditional common tasks of a home, family and practical cooking and cleaning. After the 2011 Swedish school reform, the curriculum have been restructured with more focus on the topics of health, economy and environment which includes Consumer economics as well as Consumer awareness.

=== United Kingdom ===
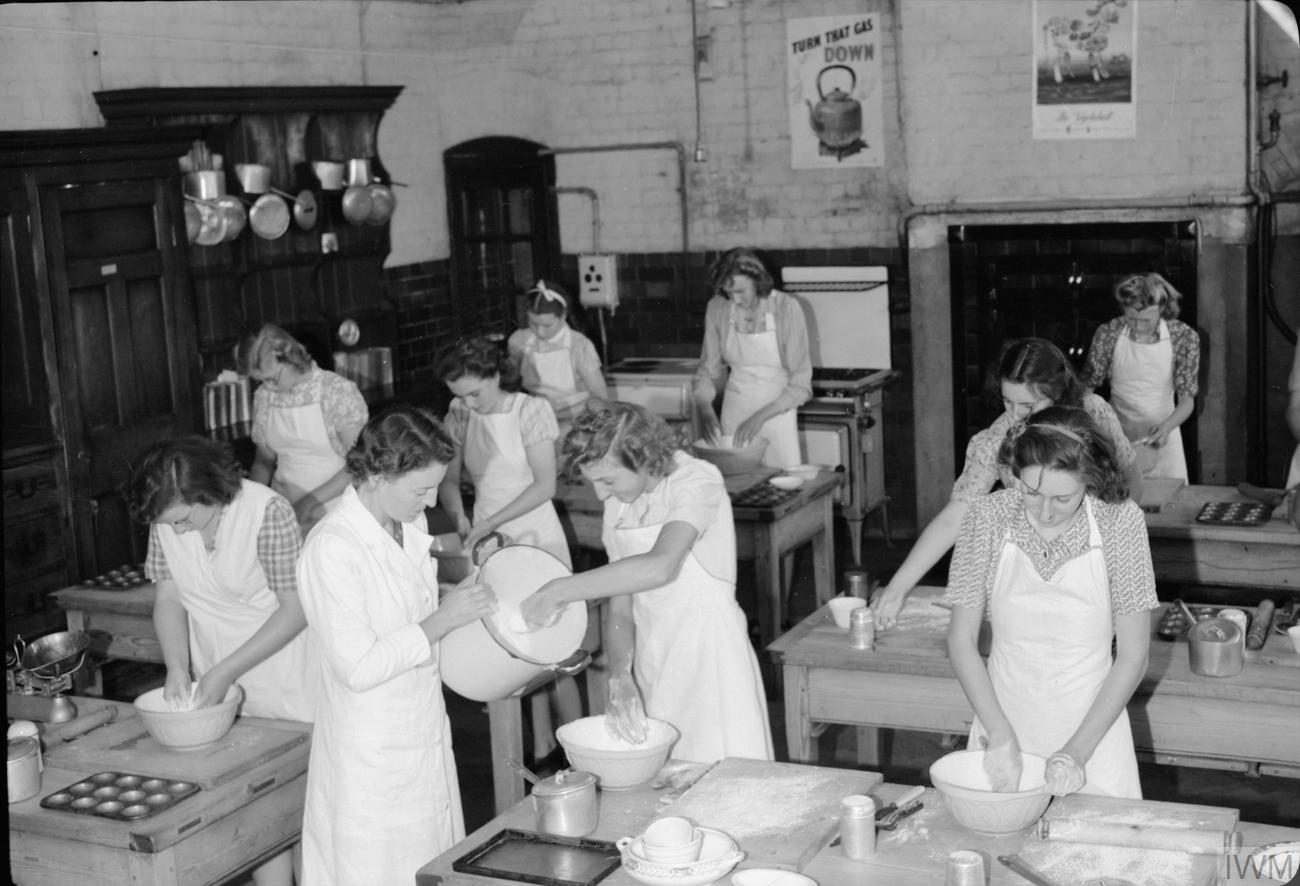
Pupils in a domestic science class at a secondary school in Reading, England, 1945

In 1852 Louisa Hope and others created the Scottish Ladies Association for Promoting Female Industrial Education. The intention was to ensure that females would learn sewing and in time other domestic subjects in separate gender based education. The Church of Scotland had decided in 1849 that it wanted female "schools of industry". Women were seen as centres of moral and religious values for families and upper class ladies in the new association saw it as their role to provide it.

In 1853 Hope published, The Female Teacher: Ideas Suggestive of Her Qualifications and Duties where she notes that women should be "keepers at home" and men should see to his "labour and his work until the evening". Education of females would elevate the "lower classes" and this was the "aim of the Scottish Ladies Association for Promoting Female Industrial Education".

Hope organised a petition of 130 signatures of "principal ladies of Scotland" demanding improved sewing lesson for girls in Scottish schools. The petition was supported by letters sent to newspapers and this was of underestimated influence. By 1861 grants were available to support this objective and in 1870 70% of schools were including sewing in their curriculum according to inspectors.

Thereza Charlotte, Lady Rucker (1863 – 1941) was a promoter of household science teaching. She helped establish Domestic Science as a university subject but only at one university in England.

In the UK, Home Economics was a GCSE qualification offered to secondary school pupils, but since 2015 been replaced with a course entitled Food and Nutrition which focuses more on the nutritional side of food to economics.

In Scotland, Home Economics was replaced by Hospitality: Practical Cooking at National 3, 4 and 5 level and Health and Food Technology at National 3, 4, 5, Higher and Advanced Higher. The awarding body is the SQA.

=== United States ===
==== Nineteenth century ====
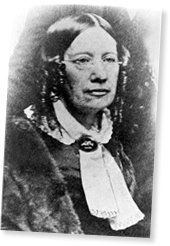
Catharine Beecher, American educator

Over the years, homemaking in the United States has been a foundational piece of the education system, particularly for women. These homemaking courses, called home economics, have had a prevalent presence in secondary and higher education since the 19th century. By definition, home economics is "the art and science of home management", meaning that the discipline incorporates both creative and technical aspects into its teachings. Home economics courses often consist of learning how to cook, how to do taxes, and how to perform child care tasks. In the United States, home economics courses have been a key part of learning the art of taking care of a household. One of the first to champion the economics of running a home was Catherine Beecher, sister to Harriet Beecher Stowe.

Since the nineteenth century, schools have been incorporating home economics courses into their education programs. In its early years, home economics began with the goal of professionalizing domestic labor for women whilst also uplifting the idea of "women's work". In the United States, the teaching of home economics courses in higher education greatly increased with the Morrill Act of 1862. Signed by Abraham Lincoln, the Act granted land to each state or territory in America for higher educational programs in vocational arts, specifically mechanical arts, agriculture, and home economics. Such land grants allowed for people of a wider array of social classes to receive better education in important trade skills.

Home economics courses mainly taught students how to cook, sew, garden, and take care of children. The vast majority of these programs were dominated by women. Home economics allowed for women to receive a better education while also preparing them for a life of settling down, doing the chores, and taking care of the children while their husbands became the breadwinners. At this time, homemaking was largely accessible to middle and upper class white women whose families could afford secondary schooling.

In the late 19th century, the Lake Placid Conferences took place. The conferences consisted of a group of educators working together to elevate the discipline to a legitimate profession. Originally, they wanted to call this profession "oekology", the science of right living. However, "home economics" was ultimately chosen as the official term in 1899.

The first book on home economics was Mrs. Welch's Cookbook, published in 1884 at Iowa State by Mary Beaumont Welch. Welch's classes on domestic economy were the first in the nation to give college credit on the subject.

==== Twentieth century ====
Home economics in the United States education system increased in popularity in the early twentieth century. It emerged as a movement to train women to be more efficient household managers. At the same moment, American families began to consume many more goods and services than they produced. To guide women in this transition, professional home economics had two major goals: to teach women to assume their new roles as modern consumers and to communicate homemakers' needs to manufacturers and political leaders. The development of the profession progressed from its origins as an educational movement to its identity as a source of consumer expertise in the interwar period to its virtual disappearance by the 1970s. An additional goal of the field was to "rationalize housework", or lend the social status of a profession to it, based on a theory that housework could be intellectually fulfilling to women engaged in it, along with any emotional or relational benefits.

Pioneers of the field included numerous female figures, such as Ellen Swallow Richards, who had profound impacts on the home economics profession. In 1909, Richards founded the American Home Economics Association (now called the American Association of Family and Consumer Sciences). From 1900 to 1917, more than thirty bills discussed in Congress dealt with issues of American vocational education and, by association, home economics. Americans wanted more opportunities for their young people to learn vocational skills and to learn valuable home and life skills. However, home economics was still dominated by women and women had little access to other vocational trainings. As stated by the National Education Association (NEA) on the distribution of males and females in vocations, "one-third of our menfolk are in agriculture, and one-third in non-agricultural productive areas; while two-thirds of our women are in the vocation of homemaking".

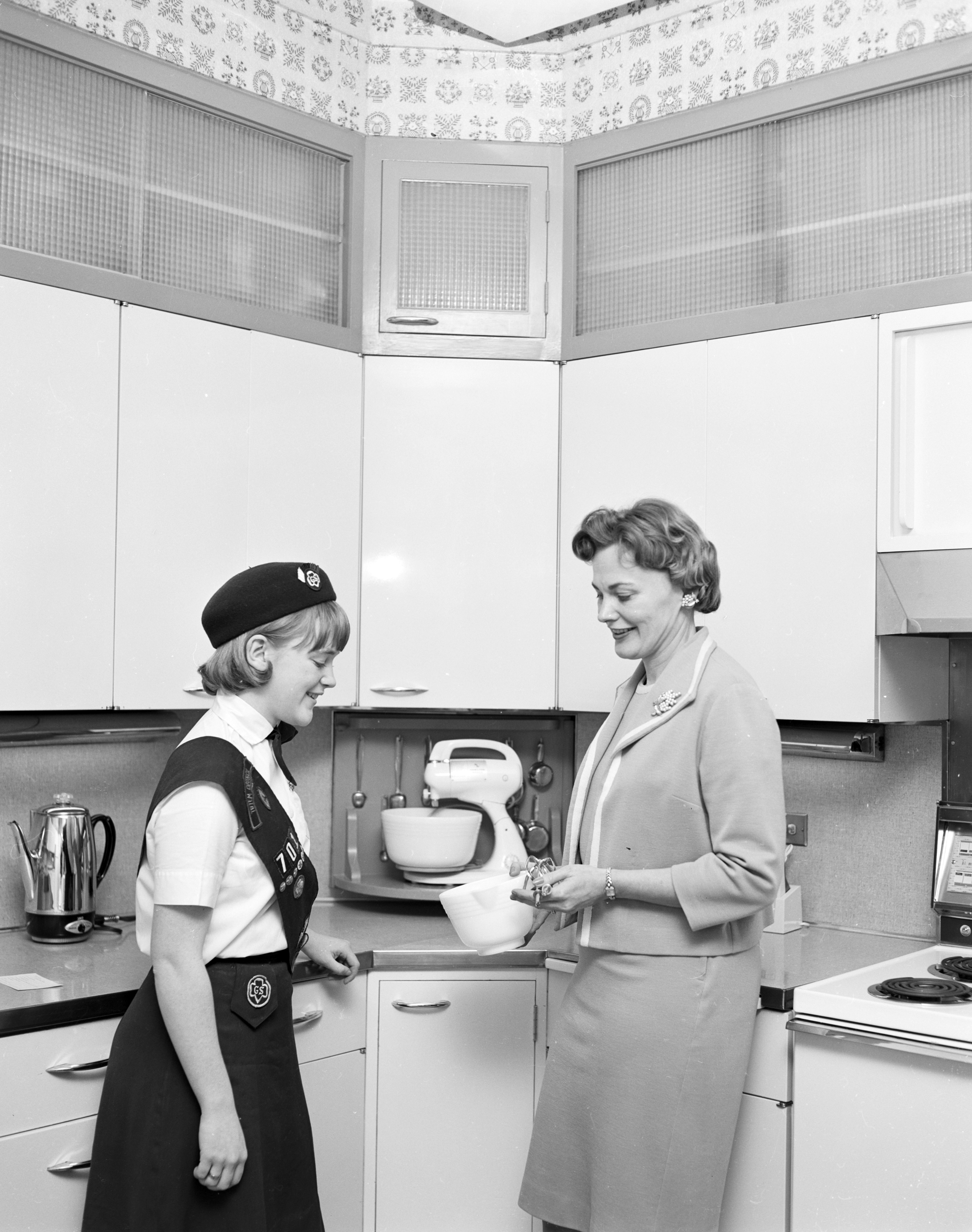
Home economist Mary Norris with a Girl Scout, Seattle, Washington, 1966

Practice homes were added to American universities in the early 1900s in order to model a living situation, with the first facility built for home management practice constructed in the early 1920s at North Dakota Agricultural College. The all-women 'team' model used for students was different from prevailing expectations of housewives. For example, women were graded on collaboration, while households at the time assumed that women would be working independently. Nevertheless, the practice homes were valued. These practicum courses took place in a variety of environments including single-family homes, apartments, and student dorm-style blocks. For a duration of a number of weeks, students lived together while taking on different roles and responsibilities, such as cooking, cleaning, interior decoration, hosting, and budgeting. Some classes also involved caring for young infants, temporarily adopted from orphanages. Children's service organizations helped supply the babies who were awaiting adoption. At Cornell University, the first practice baby was called Dicky Domecon, named after the phrase "domestic economy". Dicky was borrowed by Cornell in 1920 when he was three weeks old. Practice babies belonged to the students and to the department and were considered central to the proper training and development of home economics students. Many fields of high acuity use simulation to enhance training in complicated situations. Childcare practicums were often included at the same time as other classwork, requiring students to configure their intellectual and home lives as compatible with one another. Home economics programs were using practice babies nationwide, however by 1959 less than one percent of programs still ran full-time operations. The practice was discontinued altogether by the early 1970s. According to Megan Elias, "in the ideal, domestic work was as important as work done outside the home and it was performed by teams of equals who rotated roles. Each member of the team was able to live a life outside the home as well as inside the home, ideally, one that both informed her domestic work and was informed by it. This balance between home and the wider world was basic to the movement."

There was a great need across the United States to continue improving the vocational and homemaking education systems because demand for work was apparent after World War I and II. Therefore, in 1914 and 1917, women's groups, political parties, and labor coalitions worked together in order to pass the Smith-Lever Act and the Smith-Hughes Act. The Smith-Lever Act of 1914 and the Smith-Hughes Act of 1917 created federal funds for "vocational education agriculture, trades and industry, and homemaking" and created the Office of Home Economics. With this funding, the United States was able to create more homemaking educational courses all across the country.

Throughout the 1940s, Iowa State College (later University) was the only program granting a Master of Science in household equipment. However, this program was centered on the ideals that women should acquire practical skills and a scientifically based understanding of how technology in the household works. For example, women were required to disassemble and then reassemble kitchen machinery so they could understand basic operations and understand how to repair the equipment. In doing so, Iowa State effectively created culturally acceptable forms of physics and engineering for women in an era when these pursuits were not generally accessible to them.

Throughout the latter part of the twentieth century, home economics courses became more inclusive. In 1963, Congress passed the Vocational Education Act, which granted funds to vocational education job training. Home economics courses started being taught across the nation to both boys and girls by way of the rise of second-wave feminism. This movement pushed for gender equality, leading to equality in education. Starting in 1994, home economics courses in the United States began being referred to as "family and consumer sciences" in order to make the class appear more inclusive. With desegregation and the Civil Rights Act of 1964, men and women of all backgrounds could equally learn how to sew, cook, and balance a checkbook.

In the 1980s, "domestic celebrities" rose to stardom. Celebrities, such as Martha Stewart, created television programs, books, magazines, and websites about homemaking and home economics, which attested to the continued importance of independent experts and commercial mass-media organizations in facilitating technological and cultural change in consumer products and services industries.

Despite many secondary education establishments still referring to these enrichment classes as "home economics", the name was officially changed in 1994 by the American Association of Family & Consumer Sciences to "family and consumer sciences" to more accurately represent the profession and field as a whole. As society changed over time, so did the needs of students in these classes. Topics such as nutrition, family finance, and other social justice issues have been added to family and consumer sciences classes, most frequently taught in high schools and colleges.

==== Twenty-first century ====
Today FCS is part of the broader Career Technical Education (CTE) umbrella. Career and technical education is a term applied to programs that specialize in skilled trades, applied sciences, modern technologies, and career preparation. While traditional home economics focused on preparing women to care for a family and home, family consumer science continues to adapt its course offerings to meet the needs of students both for personal growth and professional opportunities. Students can take classes in culinary arts, education, food science, nutrition, health and wellness, interior design, child development, personal finance, textiles, apparel, and retailing. Students who take FCS classes can join the student organization Family, Career, and Community Leaders of America.

FCS and CTE courses help prepare students for careers rather than university. Also, homemaking and home economics courses have developed a negative connotation because of the negative gender bias associated with home economics courses. Despite this, homemaking is now socially acceptable for both men and women to partake in. In the United States, both men and women are expected to take care of the home, the children, and the finances. More women are pursuing higher education rather than homemaking. In 2016, 56.4% of college students were female as opposed to 34.5% in 1956. Some schools are starting to incorporate life skill courses back into their curriculum, but as a whole, home economics courses have been in major decline in the past century.

In 2012 there were only 3.5 million students enrolled in FCS secondary programs, a decrease of 38 percent over a decade. In 2020 the AAFCS estimates that there are 5 million students enrolled in FCS programs, a significant increase from past years that is still growing.

== See also ==
- Consumer economics
- Domestic technology
- Ellen Swallow Richards
- Euthenics
- Family (economics)
- Homemaker
- Human ecology
- The Secret History of Home Economics
