= SS Persian Monarch =

Steam/sailing ship

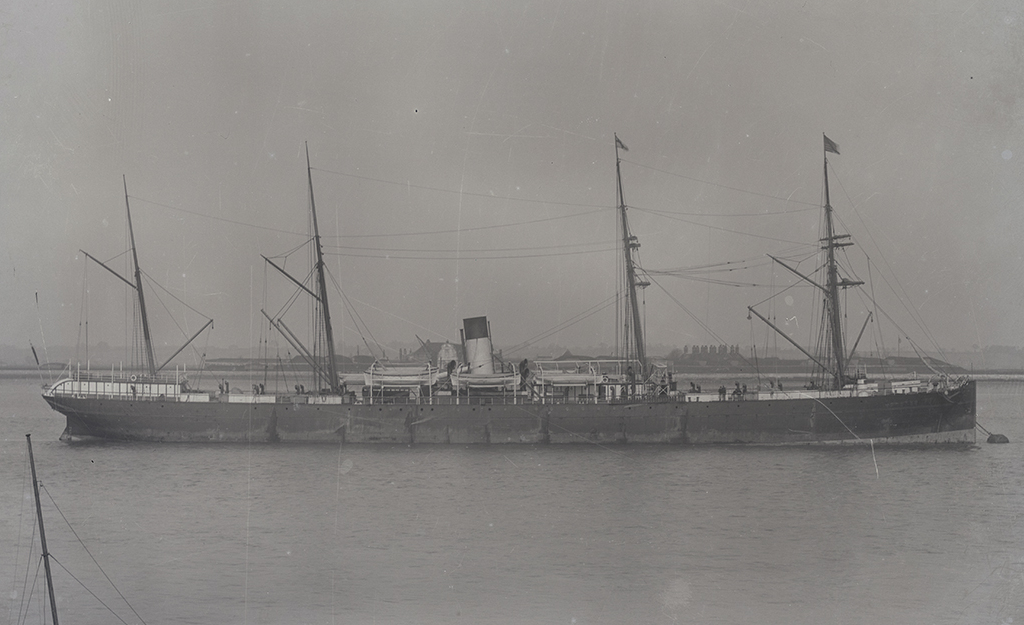
- Persian Monarch sometime between 1883 and 1889

History

United Kingdom
- Name: Persian Monarch
- Owner: 1880–1887: Monarch Line; 1887–1894: Wilson Line; 1894–1899: Charles R. Flint and Company; 1899: W. D. Walker; 1899–1900: California Shipping Company
- Route: 1880–1894: New York to London; 1895–1900: Tramp
- Builder: Archibald McMillan & Son, Dumbarton
- Cost: $150,000
- Laid down: 1880
- Launched: 8 September 1880
- Completed: November 1880
- Renamed: 1895: May Flint
- Fate: Sank following collision on 8 September 1900

General characteristics
- Displacement: NRT of 2,568 tons; GT of 3,725 tons
- Length: 360 feet (110 m)
- Beam: 48 feet (15 m)
- Installed power: 500 horsepower (370 kW)
- Propulsion: 1 × steam engine
- Speed: Top: 12.5 knots (23.2 km/h; 14.4 mph)

General characteristics as May Flint
- Length: oa: 370 feet (110 m); lbp: 350 feet (110 m)
- Beam: 42.5 feet (13.0 m)
- Depth: 36.2 feet (11.0 m)
- Sail plan: Barque

SS Persian Monarch was an iron-hulled trans-Atlantic ocean liner, built, as a steamer, for Monarch Line's London to New York route in 1880. Designed to carry immigrants westbound and cattle eastbound, she was one of four sister ships intended to establish the company in the North Atlantic passenger trade. After several mishaps and the Monarch Line's financial collapse, the vessel was sold to the Wilson Line, which operated her on the same route until she ran aground off Long Island in 1894. The damage was severe, and she was auctioned off to Charles R. Flint and Company once freed.

Her new owners rebuilt her into the nation's largest sailing ship and operated her as a barque named May Flint for the next four years. She operated in the Pacific and US west coast, and endured several storms before she was sold again in 1899. Now owned by the California Shipping Company, the barque arrived in San Francisco in 1900. Unable to find a tugboat, she sailed into the bay which was crowded due to an upcoming naval parade. The wind died down, leaving the ship to drift into USS Iowa and another barque. After colliding, May Flint rapidly sank as her crew evacuated. The wreck was partially destroyed and now lies in the middle of San Francisco harbor.

== Development and design ==
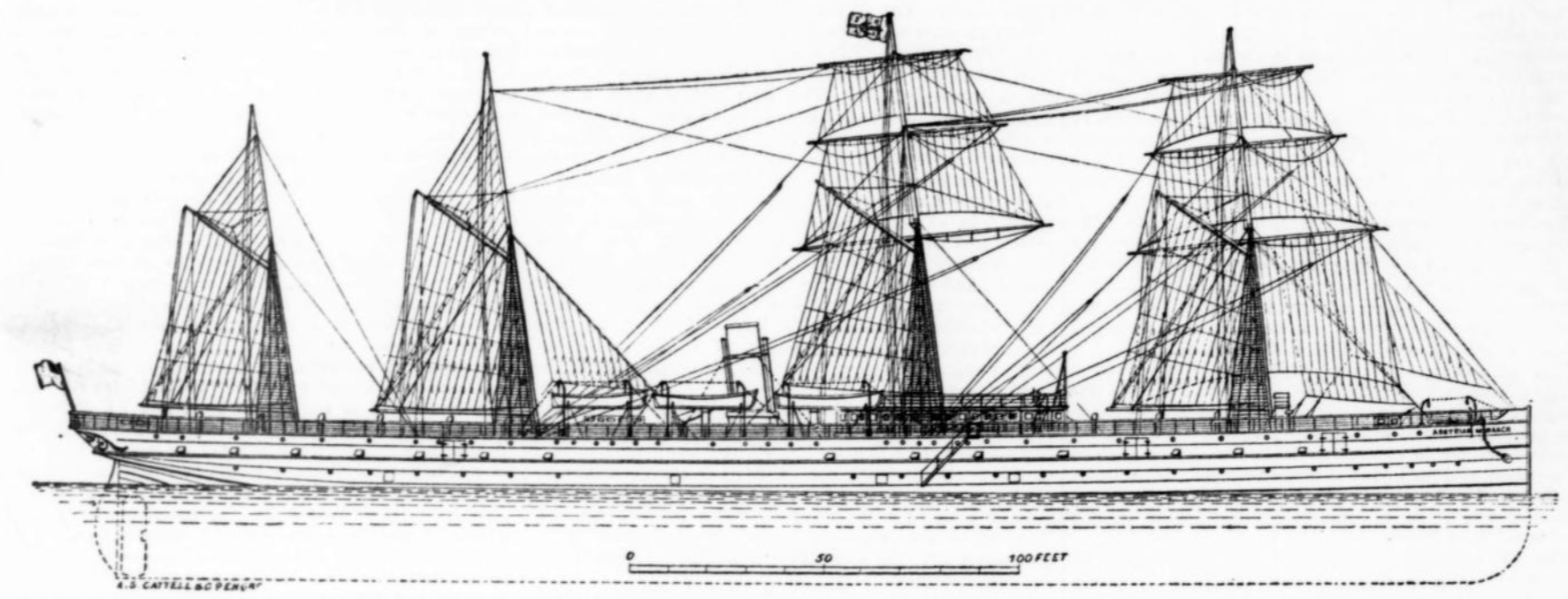
Illustration of Persian Monarch's sister ship Assyrian Monarch under sail

The Royal Exchange Shipping Company, better known as Monarch Line, was a small British shipping company that focused on sailing ships that carried cargo to the Mediterranean and Far East during the 1870s. In 1879, the company decided to launch a new venture: passenger service between New York and London. For the new route, it ordered the large steamships Assyrian Monarch, Persian Monarch, Egyptian Monarch, and Lydian Monarch. The four ships were similar in design, with Persian Monarch having a length of 360 feet (110 m), a beam of 48 feet (15 m), a net register tonnage of 2,568 tons, and a gross tonnage of 3,725 tons. She was fitted with one funnel, four masts, a coal-powered two-cylinder steam engine and a single propeller that could produce 500 horsepower (370 kW) and a top speed of 12.5 knots (23.2 km/h; 14.4 mph). The hull was made of iron and had a capacity for 1,000 steerage passengers and between 40 and 60 passengers in the saloon. The hull was subdivided by six concrete bulkheads. Two decks were made of iron, in addition to another deck and the shelter deck. She was built by Archibald McMillan & Son at Dumbarton and was laid down in 1880, launched on 8 September, and completed in November.

== Service history ==
=== Monarch Line ===
Persian Monarch soon joined the company, and was the first Monarch Line vessel to reach New York City. In late December 1880, the steamship sailed from New York to London, but encountered poor weather. The ship was thrown around by the waves, and a leak sprung in the aft. The amount of water rapidly overwhelmed the pumps and began to flood a cargo hold before the captain abandoned the voyage and returned to New York. The steamship rendezvoused with a tugboat that helped get the flooding under control, which allowed her to reach a dry dock in the city. The ship was regularly involved in similar mishaps, such as an incident in 1881 when she lost her propeller and had to sail for London under sail or when she ran aground off Devonshire in 1886. While in nominal service, Persian Monarch and her sister ships carried cattle to London and immigrants to New York despite Monarch Line's fiscal instability. By 1884, the company struggled to find passengers during a recession and increased competition from the Twin Screw Line forced it to liquidate in 1887. The ships were sold off, with Persian Monarch being sold to Wilson Line.

=== Wilson Line ===
Alongside Egyptian Monarch, Lydian Monarch, and several ships from Twin Screw Line, Persian Monarch continued to operate on a New York-London route as part of the Wilson-Hill Line. The Wilson-Hill Line was not an independent company, but a joint-passenger service between Wilson and Twin Screw Line. On one such voyage, Persian Monarch carried the members (Note: Excluding Black Elk, who became separated and left in Europe) of Buffalo Bill's Wild West back from an exhibition season in Europe. Mid-voyage, Old Charlie, Buffalo Bill's favorite horse, died. The animal was brought onto the deck, covered with an American flag, and given a burial at sea. After reaching Staten Island, the ship and her passengers were greeted with immense fanfare.

==== Grounding off Long Island ====
At 9:30 pm on 2 May 1894, the ship was sailing to New York when she struck a sandbar off Eastport on Long Island and ran aground. The weather was clear and calm when the incident occurred, and crew from a nearby lifesaving station quickly responded. As the ship was not in any danger, they were dismissed by the captain. The steamship laid in 22 feet (6.7 m) of water, parallel to the beach and rested at an angle 0.25 miles (0.40 km) off shore. The next day, salvage work began with an attempt to free the ship's propeller, which failed. Locals gathered to see the stranded steamship as passengers remained onboard without concern. The ship began to settle into the sandbar, which was counteracted by pumping out onboard water ballast. On 4 May, the low tide left the ship heeled over at a sharp angle, and high winds complicated efforts. Several tugboats arrived, one pulling a barge. Cargo from Persian Monarch was loaded onto the barge to lighten the load and passengers were swung over the side and lowered into another tugboat by a bosun's chair that night. At high tide, tugboats I. J. Merritt and C. H. Winslow succeeded in pulling the steamship free.

There was no clear cause for the accident. The sternpost and rudder were missing, which the captain blamed on a storm they had just sailed though. However, a crewmember stated that the parts had been ripped off when the ship ran aground. A naval court of inquiry investigated, and suspended the captain's license for six months. The first and second mates were censured, as well as the pilot. While a pilot was on board, he was not at the helm and failed to warn the captain about potential danger. The salvaging work cost about $25,000, so the wrecking company put her up for auction. Persian Monarch was severely damaged by the accident and was sold off for only $19,500, compared to her initial construction cost of $150,000.

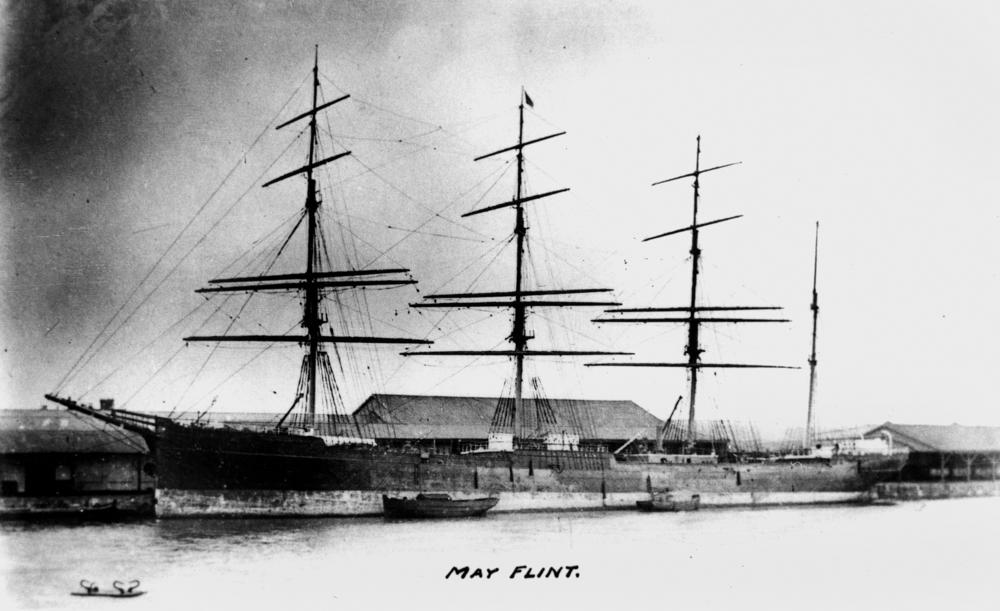
May Flint at an unknown date while docked in Australia. Her vertical stem reveals her origin as a steamship.

=== Charles R. Flint and Company ===
Her new owners were Charles R. Flint and Company, an American shipping firm. The crippled Persian Monarch was towed to Norfolk, Virginia, for conversion into a sailing ship. Her superstructure, upper deck, engines, and funnel were removed and replaced with a new deck, captain's quarters, hotel-style cabins, and rigged as a barque. Work took about six months at a cost of $92,000. The ship was gutted, and the only part which remained was the outer hull. The choice to keep the same hull shape meant that the steamship's straight stem bow was also kept, instead of modifying the shape to resemble those seen on sailing ships. Compared to similar modifications, the bowsprit was not appended to the tip of the bow, but partially up the prow. The resulting aesthetic was described as "ghastly", comparable to a "malignant growth" by one author's account, and according to Basil Lubbock, "the ugliest square rigger that ever sailed the seas". She now had an overall length of 370 feet (110 m), length between perpendiculars of 350 feet (110 m), beam of 42.5 feet (13.0 m), depth of 36.2 feet (11.0 m), and a lightweight (empty) tonnage of 2,750 tons. Her 159-foot (48 m) tall masts carried 44,000 square feet (4,100 m^{2}) of sail. The proportions intended for a steamship were not fit for sailing vessels, which lead to issues remaining stable. In addition, she had a relatively low deadweight capacity, limiting the amount of cargo she could carry and worsening stability issues.

The newly rebuild ship, renamed May Flint, was the largest American and fourth (Note: The others being the five-masted barques France, Maria Rickmers, and Potosi) largest sailing ship in the world. She was operated as a tramp ship, and towed to Baltimore in 1895 and loaded with coal for her first voyage. She then sailed to San Francisco, but a severe storm off Cape Horn caused parts of the masts to crash onto the deck. During the voyage, sailors accused the captain and officers of regular abuses, including grinding a sailor's face into a holystone, cruel beatings, rupturing a man's testicle, and using a gang to attack the sailors when in port. The charges were dismissed, much like many other allegations of brutality against American ship captains. However, the claims were featured in the Red Record, a compilation of abusive acts on board the so-called "hell ships".

For the next several years, the ship carried various raw materials and oil between the US East Coast and the Pacific, and was damaged by storms another two times. While the large ship was able to carry twice the cargo of complementary vessels, rising costs due to constant storm damage and trans-continental shipping forced her to be sold off. In 1899, her owner was listed as W. D. Walker, who was associated with the company. She was then sold to the California Shipping Company that year, who bought many of the former Flint company vessels.

=== Sinking ===
On 8 September 1900, May Flint arrived off San Francisco carrying a full load of 5,000 tons of coal. The city was celebrating the 50th anniversary of California's admission into the United States, and a naval parade was planned. The port was crowded with various ships, and a tugboat could not be found to guide her. She instead sailed into port, but the wind was irregular. While the wind was initially strong as she approached the harbor, it rapidly subsided. The shift temporarily left May Flint uncontrollable, and she smashed into USS Iowa's ram. The sailing ship's bow began to sink as she drifted and collided with the barque Vidette, damaging both vessels. May Flint's crew used the opportunity to board Vidette as their ship capsized and sank within 15 minutes. Illuminated by a searchlight, boats from Iowa were able to rescue everyone in the water. No one was killed in the accident, and many onlookers mistook the sight as being part of celebrations due to how well lit the area was.May Flint's captain was blamed for the accident. The company president stated that a tug would have been needed, and that there were other opportunities to anchor without sailing further into the harbor. A local pilot stated that the event was solely due to poor judgment and the maneuver was always risky. While Iowa was virtually undamaged, Vidette suffered immense damage to her masts and required a drydock.

She sank in shallow water, and the portions of the wreck were demolished with explosives to increase the distance to the water's surface. The wreck currently lies between Alcatraz and Market Street. In 2015, a local artist created a wood-panel painting titled May Flint (portrait of a hell ship). The painting, which depicts May Flint as a "nightmarish ship", is intended to visualize how dangerous San Francisco's harbor was to sailors. As of 2015, the artwork was displayed at the Aquatic Park Bathhouse which overlooks the shipwreck.
