= Fort de Bois l'Abbé =

- Part of Séré de Rivières system, Fortified Region of Épinal
- France
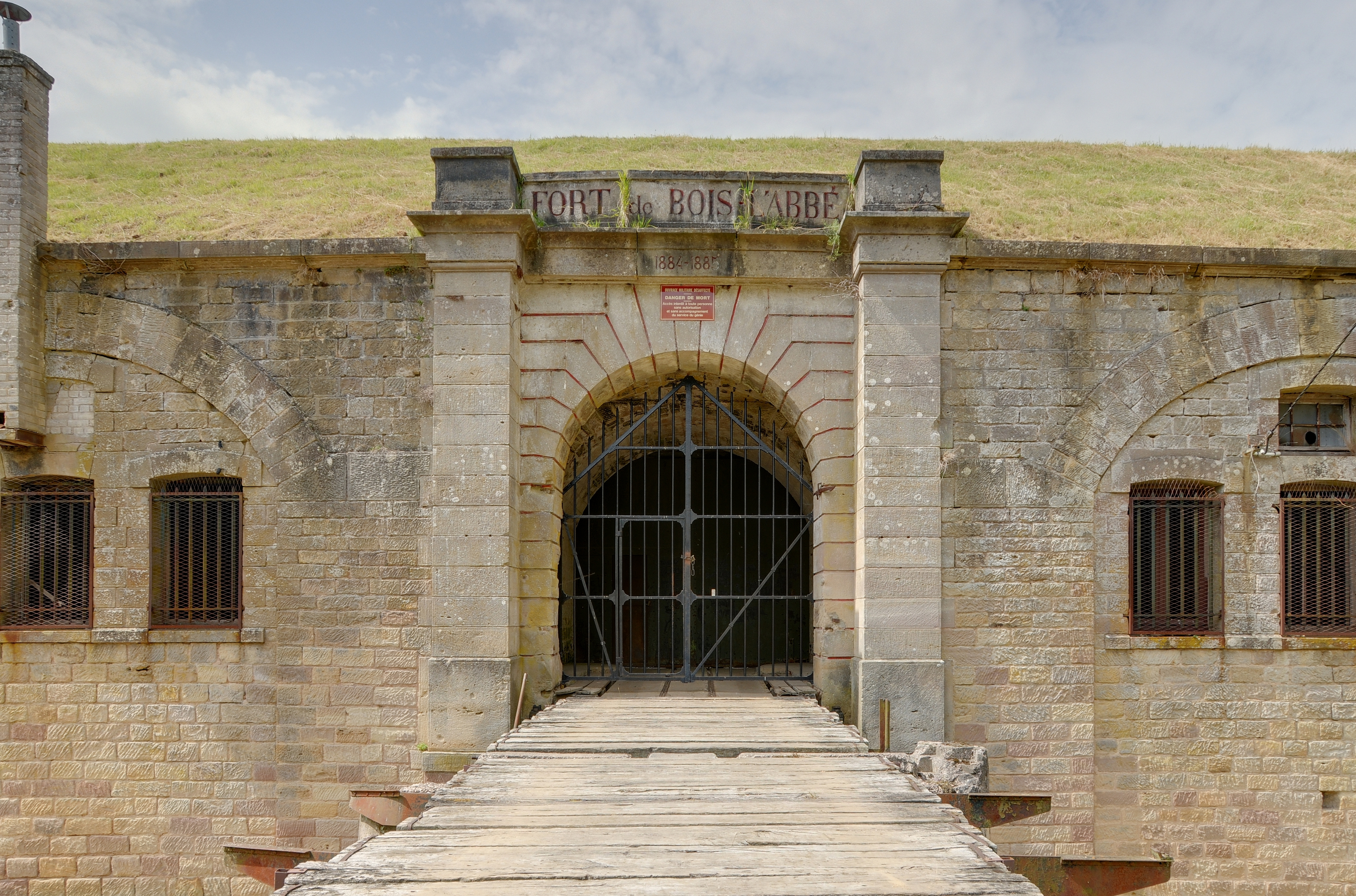
- Entry

Site information
- Type: Fort
- Controlled by: France
- Open to the public: Yes

Location
- Coordinates: 48.20442°N 6.40046°E

Site history
- Built: 1884
- Materials: Brick, stone

The Fort de Bois l'Abbé, or Fort Poniatowski, is part of the fortifications of Épinal, France. It was built near the village of Uxegney between 1883 and 1885. It is an example of a Séré de Rivières system fortification. It escaped significant alteration in the years prior to World War I and is maintained as a museum.

== Description ==
The Fort de Bois l'Abbé stands 1,200 metres (3,900 ft) to the east of its larger neighbor, the Fort d'Uxegney, at an altitude of 384 metres (1,260 ft). Its stone construction provides an excellent example of an un-modified Séré de Rivières position. The four-sided fort is somewhat smaller than the Fort d'Uxegney, with caponiers defending the protective ditch in lieu of the more modern counterscarps of Uxegney. It was constructed in 1884-1885 to watch the road from Domèvre-sur-Aviėre. A program of reinforcement was proposed in 1911, but never pursued. Original armament comprised four 120mm guns and two 90mm guns, with additional smaller arms. It was upgraded with 75mm anti-aircraft guns in 1915, while the larger guns had been removed. The fort lost strategic importance as it became clear that its views were obstructed by the Bois de Souche. A number of smaller positions were built in the Bois de Souche in lieu of improving the main fort. These were not completed at the time of mobilization in 1914.

Between 1900 and 1906 infantry shelters of a spiral queue de cochon or "pig's tail design were installed around the fort. In 1913-14 the fort received electricity, fed from the local power grid. The fort served as a central bakery, providing bread to the Fort d'Uxegney and the Fort de la Grande Haye.

== History ==
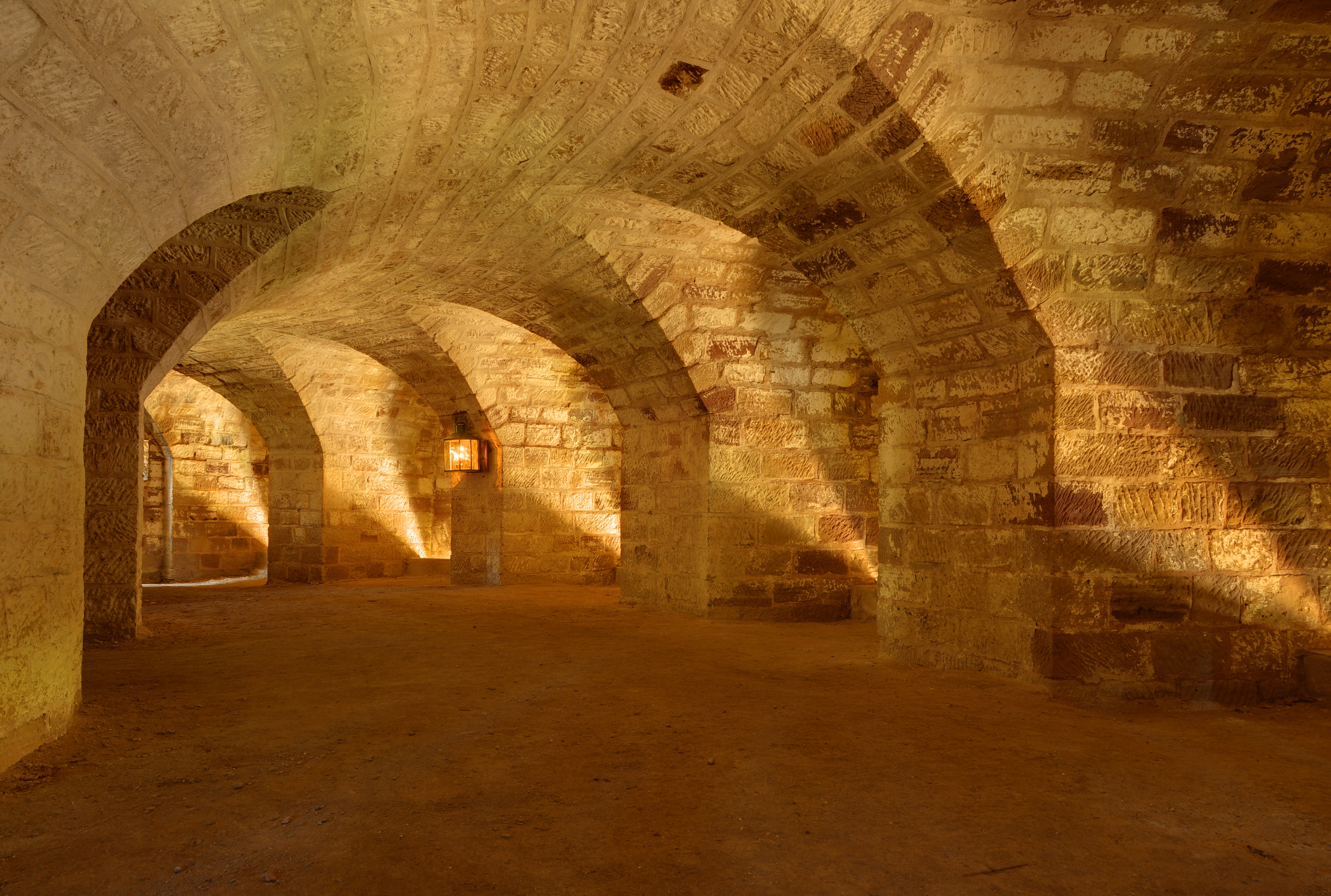
Interior of caponier at Fort de Bois l'Abbé

The Fort de Bois de l'Abbé saw no action during World War I, as the Germans did not advance into the area around Épinal. Concrete platforms were placed on the surface of the fort for 75mm anti-aircraft guns following the aerial bombardment of Épinal, but the guns were never installed.

Between World War I and World War II the fort remained military property and was used as an ammunition depot. During World War II the Germans used Bois l'Abbé to house occupying forces and continued to use it for ammunition storage.

The French army maintained an ammunition depot at the Fort de Bois l'Abbé until 1960. It was used after 1960 by private tenants, but was restored by the Association pour la Restauration du Fort d'Uxegney et de la Place d'Épinal (ARFUPE) beginning in 1995. The fort may be visited on special occasions.
