= HMS Blake (1889) =

Protected cruiser in the Royal Navy

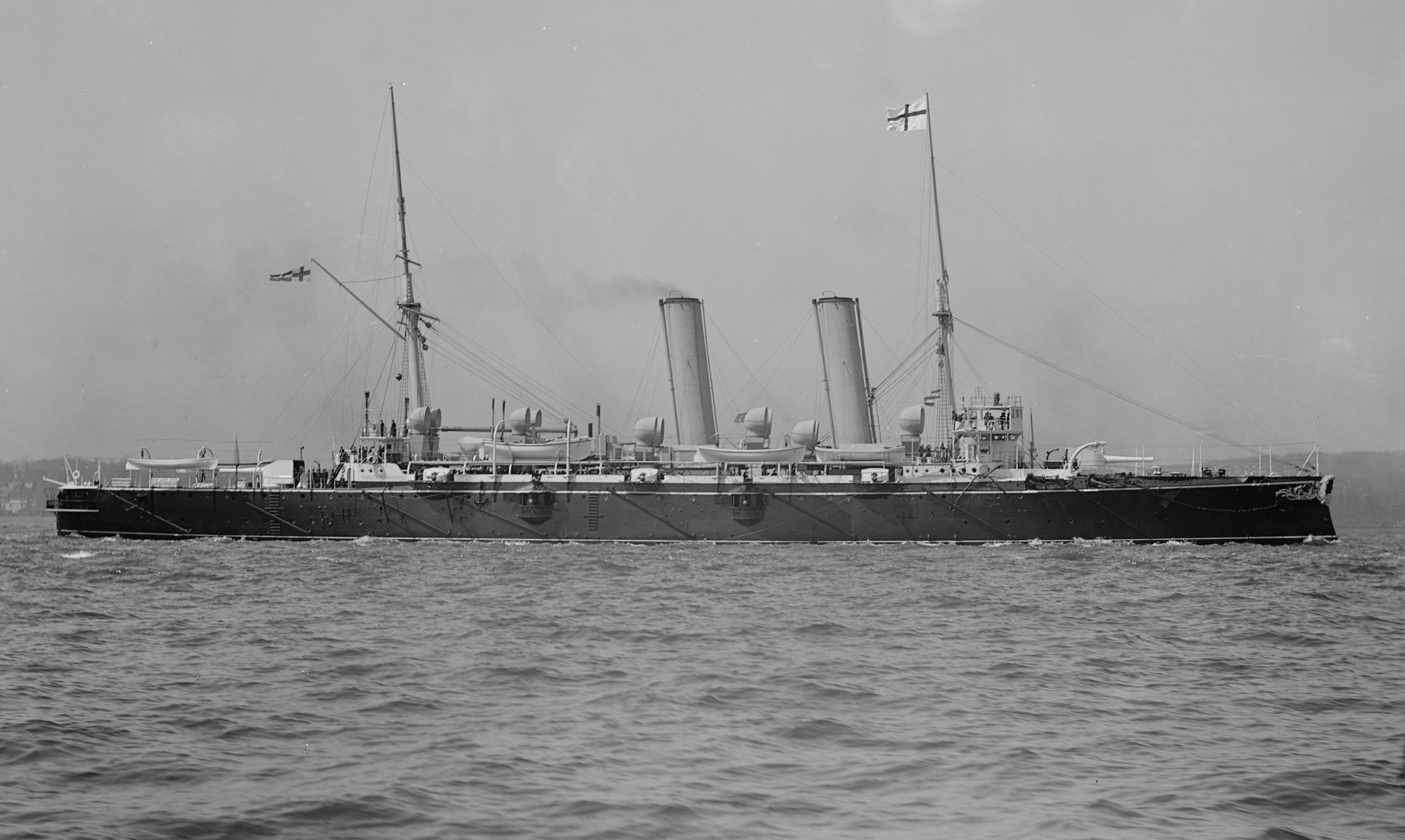

History

United Kingdom
- Name: HMS Blake
- Namesake: Admiral Robert Blake
- Builder: Chatham Dockyard
- Laid down: July 1888
- Launched: 23 November 1889
- Reclassified: Destroyer depot ship, 1907
- Fate: Sold for breaking up 9 June 1922

General characteristics
- Class & type: Blake-class protected cruiser
- Displacement: 9,150 tons
- Length: 375 ft (114.3 m) (p.p.); 399 ft 9 in (121.8 m) (o/a)
- Beam: 65 ft (19.8 m)
- Draught: 24 ft (7.3 m) (normal); 25 ft (7.6 m) (maximum)
- Installed power: 20,000 ihp (14,910 kW)
- Propulsion: 4 × triple-expansion steam engines (2 main, 2 cruising); 6 × boilers; 2 × screws
- Speed: 22 kn (25.3 mph; 40.7 km/h)
- Capacity: As Destroyer Depot Ship: Coal: 624 short tons (566 t) (normal internal fuel); 650 short tons (590 t) (carried in 1-cwt bags for destroyers)
- Complement: 570
- Armament: As Built: 2 × BL 9.2-inch (234 mm) guns; 10 × QF 6-inch (152 mm) guns; 16 × 3-pounder (47 mm) guns; 4 × 14 in (356 mm) torpedo tubes; As Destroyer Depot Ship: *; 4 × 6-inch (152 mm) guns; 2 × 4-inch (102 mm) guns
- Armour: Deck: 3–6 in (7.6–15.2 cm); Casemates: 6 in (15.2 cm)

HMS Blake, named in honour of Admiral Robert Blake, was the lead ship of her class of protected cruiser that served in the Royal Navy from 1889 to 1922.

She was launched on 23 November 1889 at Chatham Dockyard, but not completed until 2 February 1892.

== Service history ==
After service as the flagship of the North America and West Indies Squadron from 1892 to 1895, Blake served in the Channel Fleet.

In October 1900 she was employed as a temporary transport ship. She arrived at Plymouth on 2 January 1901 with the relieved crew of HMS Empress of India and invalids and prisoners from the Mediterranean Station. Later the same month she was sent to Australia with Captain Thomas Philip Walker and a crew, to relieve the crew on HMS Royal Arthur, flagship of the Australia Station. She returned to Plymouth with the former crew of Royal Arthur in June 1901, and was paid off at Devonport on 15 July 1901 to be refitted.

She was later converted to a destroyer depot ship in 1907, serving through World War I as depot ship to the 11th Destroyer Flotilla of the Grand Fleet, and was finally sold for scrapping on 9 June 1922.
