= Monarch Line =

Defunct shipping company

- Industry: Shipping
- Founded: c.1870
- Defunct: 1887
- Fate: Liquidated

The Royal Exchange Shipping Company, better known as Monarch Line, was a short-lived British shipping company in operation during the 1870s and 1880s. The company began as a shipping company before adopting steamships. It offered a London to New York trans-Atlantic crossing before running out of funds and liquidating in 1887.

== History ==
The British company was founded in the 1870s as the Royal Exchange Shipping Company and initially operated a fleet of sailing vessels that carried trade in the Mediterranean and Far East. In 1875, the company bought its first steamship, J.B. Walker, the first of several over the next several years. In 1879, the company shifted to provide a passenger and cargo route between London and New York, as London was underutilized by other companies in their trans-Atlantic routes. For the new service, the company ordered four steamships–Assyrian Monarch, Persian Monarch, Egyptian Monarch, and Lydian Monarch–which were some of the first in the Atlantic to have steel hulls. The company carried thousands of passengers in 1882 and 1883, but an economic downturn and competition from the Twin Screw Line greatly reduced the number of passengers. Unable to fiscally recover, the fleet was liquidated in 1887 and sold off to other companies.

== Ships in fleet ==
Data
Year launched	Name	Tonnage
1873	John Bramall	1,463
1874	Eastern Monarch	1,769
1875	J.B. Walker	1,482
1878	Danish Monarch	1,338
1878	Saxon Monarch	1,840
1879	Celtic Monarch	2,014
1880	Assyrian Monarch	4,017
1880	Persian Monarch	3,308
1881	Egyptian Monarch	3,967
1881	Lydian Monarch	4,036
1882	Grecian Monarch	4,258
