= Salon =

Salon may refer to:

== Common meanings ==
- Salon (gathering), a meeting for learning or enjoyment
- Beauty salon, a venue for cosmetic treatments
- French term for a drawing room, an architectural space in a home

== Arts and entertainment ==
- Salon (Paris), a prestigious annual juried art exhibition in Paris begun under Louis XIV
- The Salon (TV series), a British reality television show
- The Salon (film), a 2005 American dramatic comedy movie
- The Salon (comics), a graphic novel written and illustrated by Nick Bertozzi

== Places ==
- Salon, Aube, France, a commune
- Salon, Dordogne, France, a commune
- Salon, India, a town and nagar panchayat
- Salon (Assembly constituency), India, a constituency for the Uttar Pradesh Legislative Assembly
- Salon-de-Provence, place of Nostradamus's death.

== Other uses ==
- Salon.com, a defunct online magazine
- Champagne Salon, a producer of sparkling wine
- Salon Basnet (born 1991), Nepali actor and model
- The Salon, a Category A listed building in Glasgow, Scotland

== See also ==
- Salon-de-Provence, France, a commune
- Salon-la-Tour, France, a commune
- Salon of 1824, a noted art exhibition in Paris
- Salon des Refusés, an art exhibition showing controversial new styles, held occasionally 1863 to 1886
- Salon des Indépendants, a non-juried alternative art salon first held in 1884
- Salon d'Automne, an alternative salon including a broader variety of arts, begun in 1903
- Saloon (disambiguation)
