= HMS Blenheim (1890) =

Cruiser of the Royal Navy

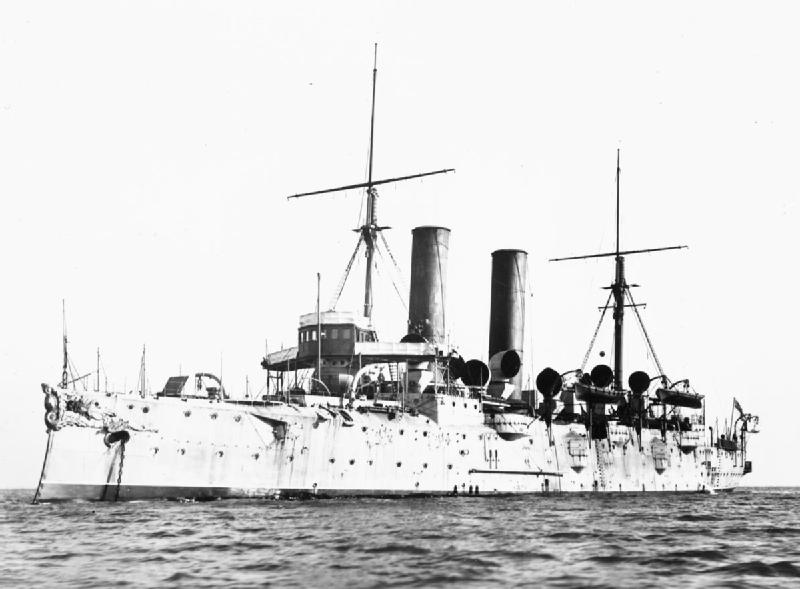
- HMS Blenheim

History

United Kingdom
- Name: HMS Blenheim
- Builder: Thames Ironworks & Shipbuilding Company, Leamouth, London
- Laid down: October 1888
- Launched: 5 July 1890
- Commissioned: 1891
- Decommissioned: 1926
- Reclassified: Depot ship 1907
- Fate: Sold for breaking up 13 July 1926

General characteristics
- Class & type: Blake-class protected cruiser
- Displacement: 9,150 tons
- Length: 375 ft (114 m)
- Beam: 65 ft (20 m)
- Propulsion: 2 propellers; 4 Humphrys, Tenant & Co Triple Expansion Steam Engines of 20,000 ihp (14,914 kW)
- Speed: 22 knots (41 km/h)
- Armament: 2 × BL 9.2 inch Mk VI guns (234 mm); 10 × QF 6 inch Mk I–III guns (152 mm); 16 × 3-pounder (57 mm) guns; 4 × 14 inch torpedo tubes

HMS Blenheim was a Blake-class first class protected cruiser that served in the Royal Navy from 1890 to 1926. She was built by Thames Ironworks & Shipbuilding Company at Leamouth, London. The ship was named after the Battle of Blenheim.

== Description ==
She displaced 9,150 tons and her steel hull measured 375 feet (114 m) (length) and 65 feet (20 m) (beam) with 20,000 indicated horsepower (15,000 kW) turning 2 propellers giving a top speed of 22 knots (41 km/h). Her main armament was two BL 9.2 inch Mk VI guns (234 mm) and six QF 6 inch guns (152 mm) on the upper deck, and four QF 6 inch guns in 150 mm compound armoured casemates on the main deck. She also carried sixteen 3-pounders, and four 14 inch torpedo tubes (two submerged and two above water).

== Service history ==
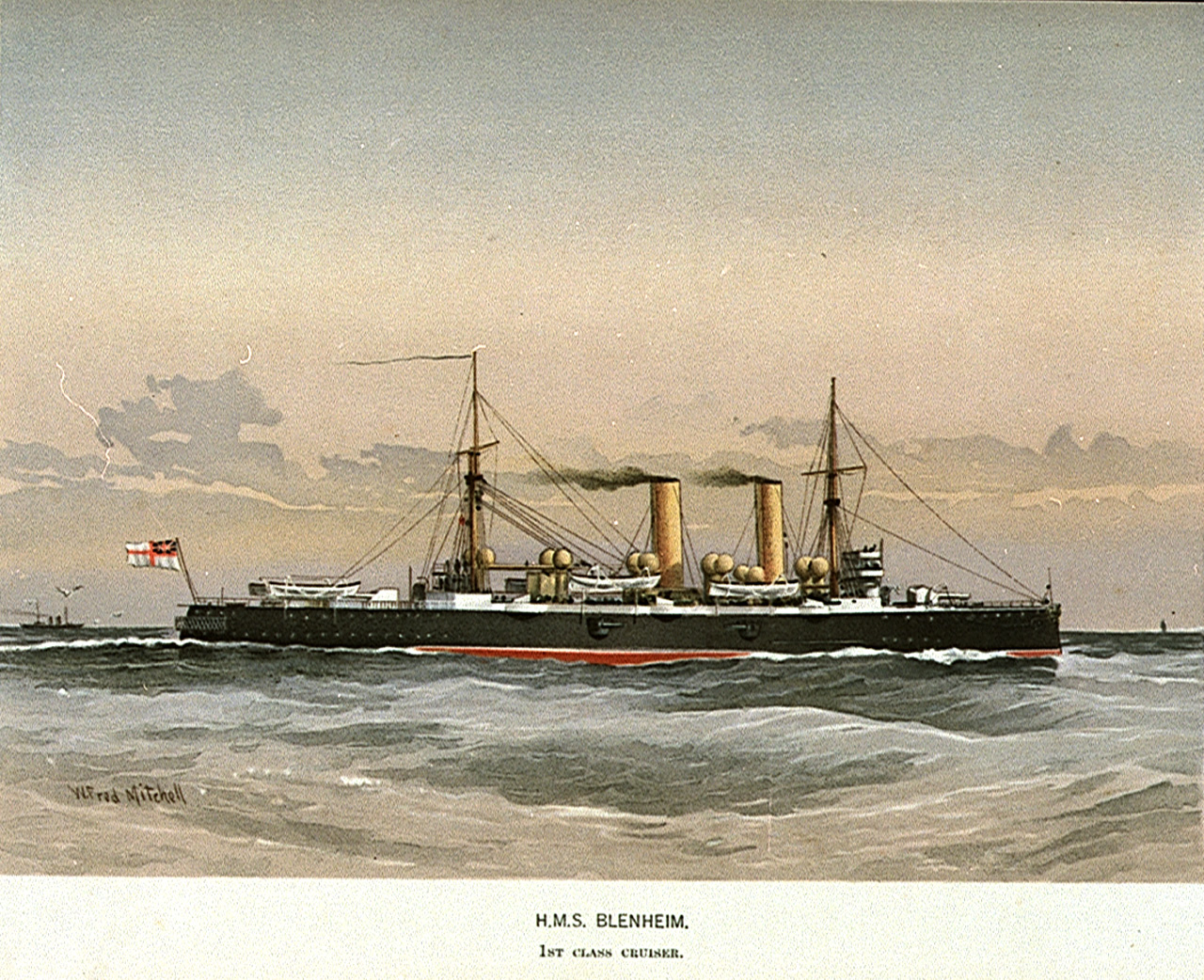
HMS Blenheim, a print by William Mitchell

Having been launched on 5 July 1890, she was commissioned at Chatham on 1 January 1891.

The then Canadian Prime Minister, Sir John Thompson, died in England just after being sworn in as a member of Queen Victoria's Privy Council in December 1894: he was repatriated to Halifax, Nova Scotia on Blenheim, which was painted black for the occasion.

Prince Henry of Battenberg died from malaria while on active duty on board HMS Blonde off Sierra Leone in January 1896 and Blenheim repatriated his body from the Canary Islands.

On 27 January 1897 Blenheim accidentally rammed and badly damaged the French five masted barque France I, one of the longest tallships afloat at the time. France I was anchored off Dungeness point showing two mooring lights (one at the bow and one at the stern). Though sea regulations of the time called for only one mooring light at the bow, it was usual practice to show another one at the stern on unusually long ships, a practice that was soon enforced into a law soon after this particular accident. The watch officer of Blenheim thought the lights were from two distinct ships anchored well apart and headed his own ship into the middle. The watchmen aboard France I shouted, sounded the ship bell, fired flares and blew the foghorn, and Blenheim altered course at the last possible instant and gave France I a glancing blow instead of a full broadside-on ramming that would probably have sunk her, as period warships had ram bows, a very deadly feature as shown by the HMS Victoria / HMS Camperdown collision. France I did not sink and went carrying on the Europe–Chile trade after extensive dockyard repairs until 1901, but a British court blamed the French ship and refused to acknowledge HMS Blenheim's responsibility, a decision that was bitterly resented in maritime circles, both in France and wider afield.

She was recommissioned on 2 January 1901 with a complement of 593 men to serve at the China station to support the British position during the Boxer Rebellion. In June 1902 she visited Nagasaki.

She then served as a cruiser with the Channel Squadron until May 1908 when she joined the Mediterranean Fleet as a destroyer depot ship. Whilst being used as a depot ship, future Rear-Admiral and VC winner Eric Gascoigne Robinson served aboard her. She was sent to Mudros in March 1915 in support of the Mediterranean Expeditionary Force at the Battle of Gallipoli. Later that year, Blenheim repatriated former Canadian Prime Minister Sir Charles Tupper who had died in England, to Halifax.

Blenheim was scrapped in 1926 at Pembroke Dock.
