= Casemate =

Fortified structure

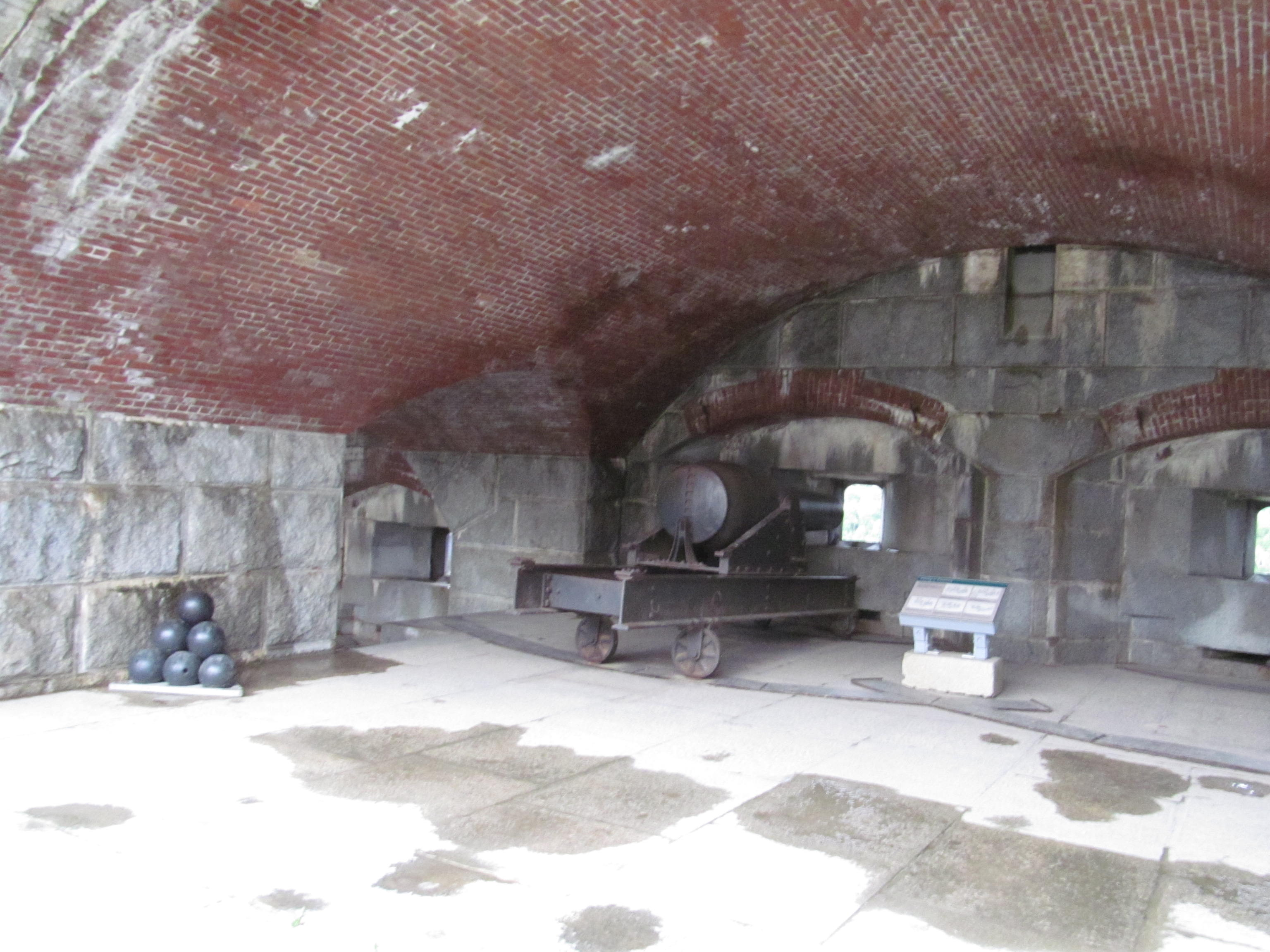
A mid-19th century artillery casemate at Fort Knox, Maine

A casemate is a fortified gun emplacement or armoured structure from which guns are fired, in a fortification, warship, or armoured fighting vehicle.

When referring to antiquity, the term "casemate wall" means a double city wall with the space between the walls separated into chambers, which could be filled up to better withstand battering rams in case of siege (see § Antiquity: casemate wall).

In its original early modern meaning, the term referred to a vaulted chamber in a fort, which may have been used for storage, accommodation, or artillery that could fire through an opening or embrasure. Although the outward faces of brick or masonry casemates proved vulnerable to advances in artillery performance, the invention of reinforced concrete allowed newer designs to be produced well into the 20th century. With the introduction of ironclad warships, the definition was widened to include a protected space for guns in a ship, either within the hull or in the lower part of the superstructure. Although the main armament of ships quickly began to be mounted in revolving gun turrets, secondary batteries continued to be mounted in casemates; however, several disadvantages eventually led to their replacement by turrets as well. In tanks and other armored fighting vehicles lacking a turret for the main gun, the structure accommodating the gun is also called a casemate.

== Etymology ==
First recorded in French in the mid-16th century, from the Italian casamatta or Spanish casamata, perhaps meaning a slaughterhouse, although it could derive from casa (in the sense of "hut"), and matta (Latin matta), "done with reeds and wickers", thus a low-roof hut without windows or other openings set in marshy place. It could also come from casa matta with matta in the sense of "false". However, it may have been ultimately derived from the Greek chásmata (χάσματα), a gap or aperture.

== Antiquity: casemate wall ==
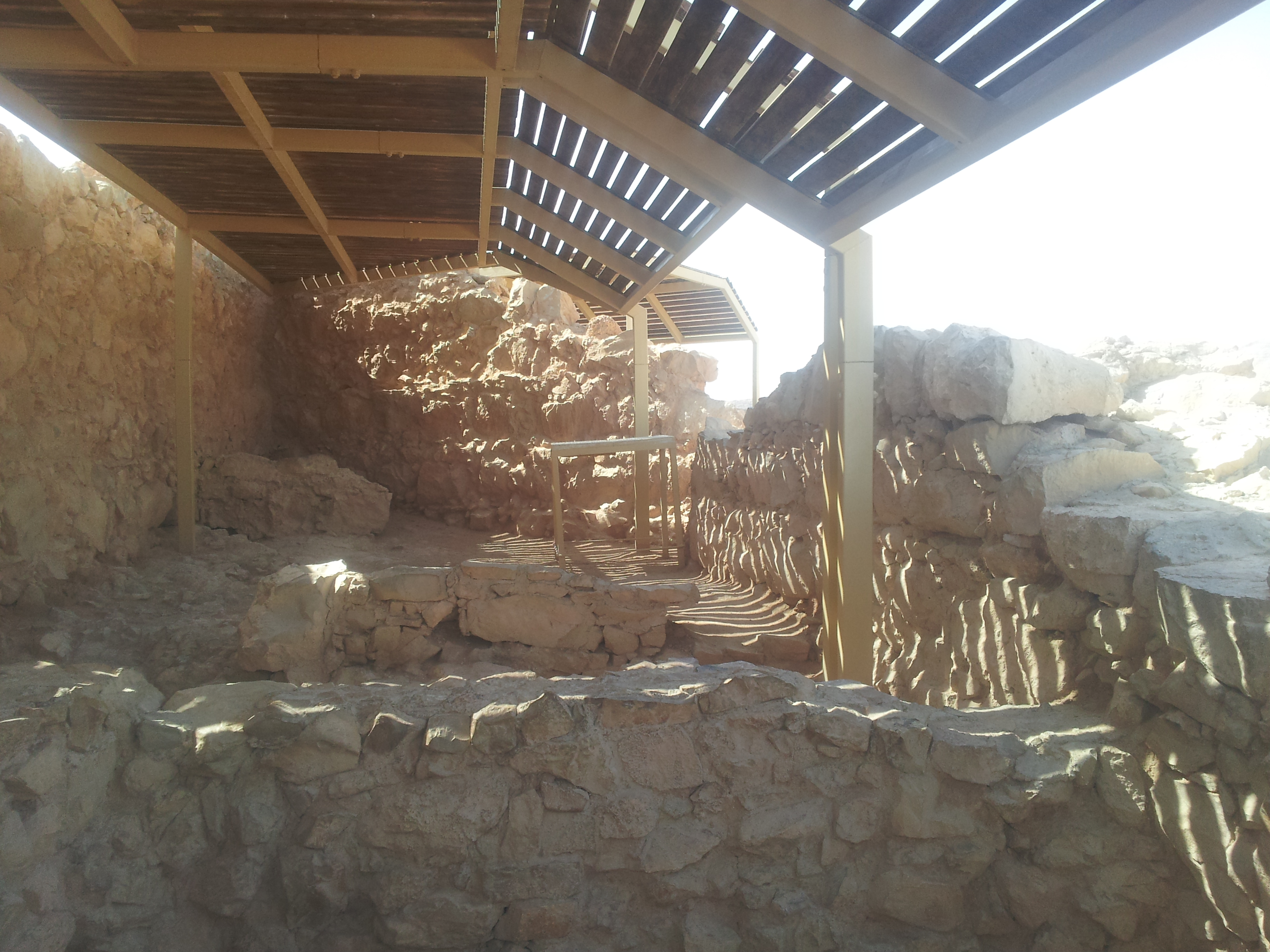
An ancient casemate wall at Masada

The term casemate wall is used in the archaeology of Israel and the wider Near East for a double city wall or fortress, with transverse walls separating the space between the two walls into chambers. These chambers could be used for storage or habitation, and could be filled with soil and rocks during a siege to strengthen the outer wall against battering rams.

Casemate walls were thought to have been introduced to the region by the Hittites until the discovery of walls which predated the Hittites' arrival. The earliest uncovered casemate wall, dated to the 16th century BC, is at Ti'inik (Taanach). Casemate walls became a common type of fortification in the Southern Levant between the Middle Bronze Age (MB) and Iron Age II. They became more numerous during the Iron Age and peaked in Iron Age II (10th–6th century BC). By the 9th century BC, sturdier solid walls began to replace casemate walls as a response to the battering rams used by the Neo-Assyrian Empire.

Casemate walls could surround an entire settlement; most only protected part of it. Three types of casemate walls have been identified: freestanding, integrated (the inner wall was part of the settlement's outer buildings), and filled (the rooms between the walls were filled with soil during construction). The filled type had the advantage of quick but stable construction for particularly high walls.

== Modern period ==
=== Land fortification ===
==== Early modern period ====
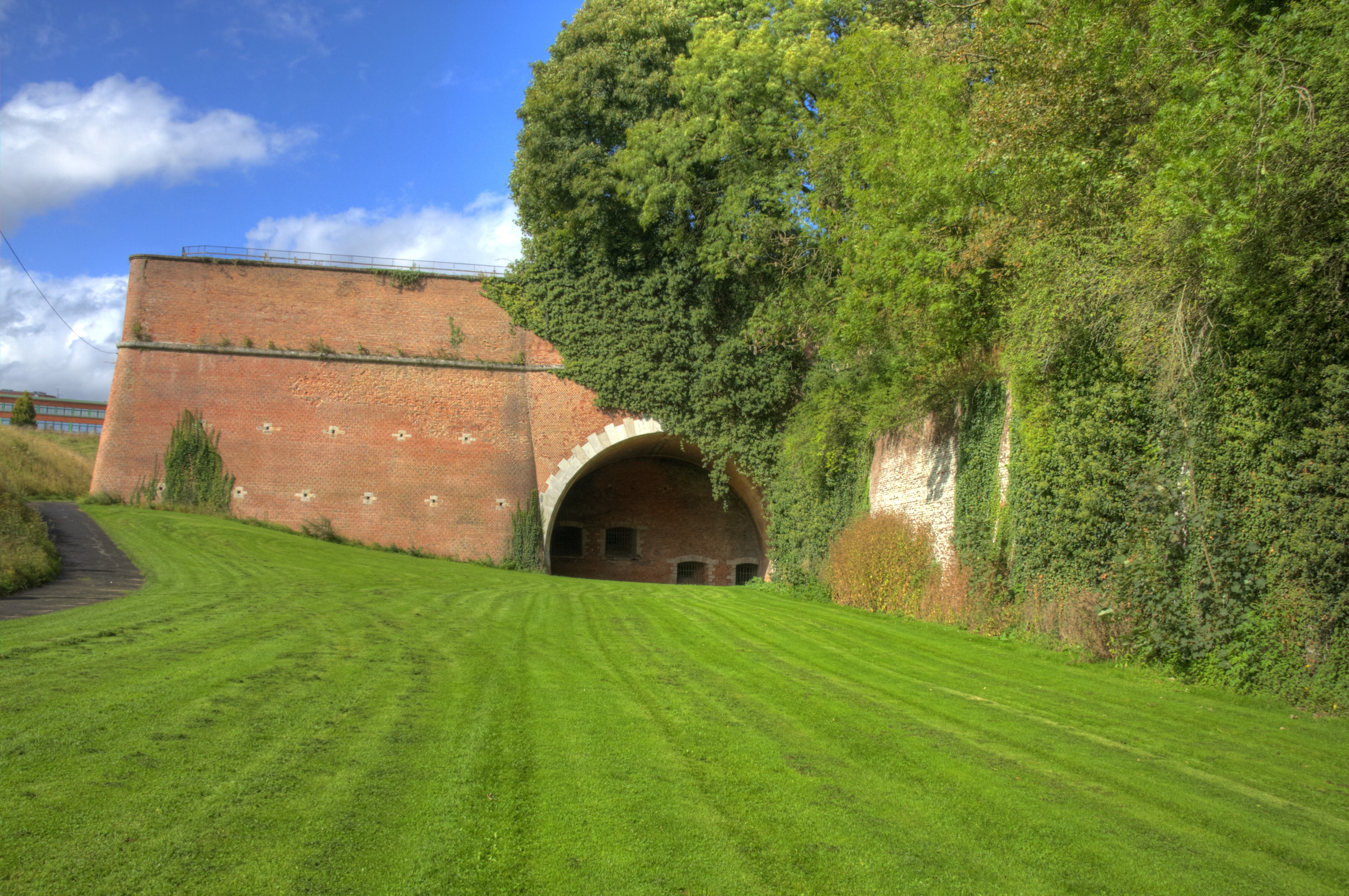
Embrasures for artillery casemates in the flank of a bastion at the 17th-century Citadel of Arras.

In fortifications designed to resist artillery, a casemate was originally a vaulted chamber usually constructed underneath the rampart. It was intended to be impenetrable and could be used for sheltering troops or stores. With the addition of an embrasure through the scarp face of the rampart, it could be used as a protected gun position. In bastion forts, artillery casemates were sometimes built into the flanks of bastions, but in action they quickly filled with smoke making them inoperable and for that reason, had fallen out of favor during the 17th century.

==== 18th and 19th centuries ====
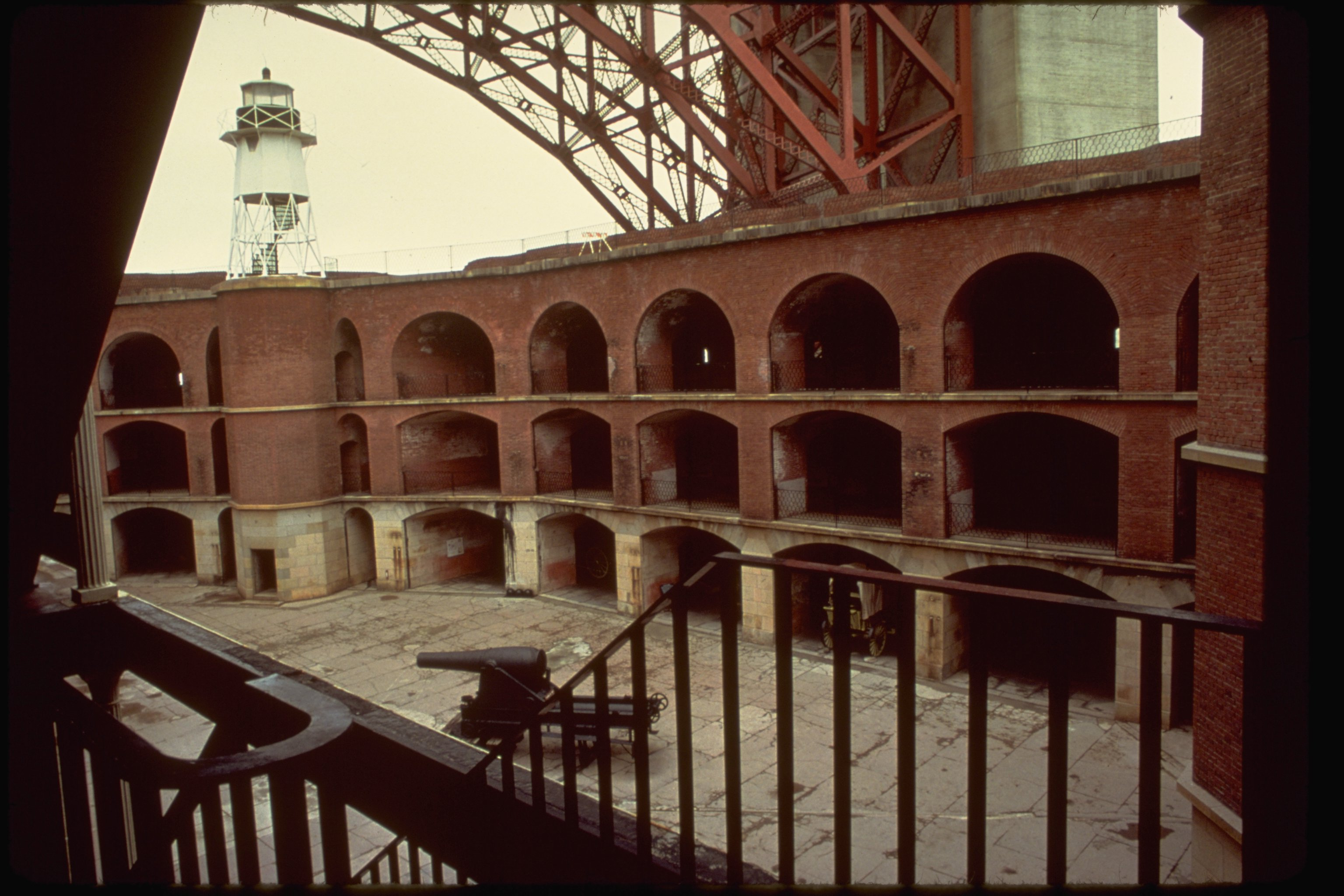
Three tiers of artillery casemates at the mid-19th century Fort Point, San Francisco

In the late 18th century, Marc René, marquis de Montalembert (1714–1800) experimented with improved casemates for artillery, with ventilation systems that overcame the problem of smoke dispersal found in earlier works. For coastal fortifications, he advocated multi-tiered batteries of guns in masonry casemates, capable of bringing concentrated fire to bear on passing warships. In 1778, he was commissioned to build a fort on the Île-d'Aix, defending the port of Rochefort, Charente-Maritime. The outbreak of the Anglo-French War forced him to hastily to build his casemated fort from wood but he was able to prove that his well-designed casemates were capable of operating without choking the gunners with smoke. The defenses of the new naval base at Cherbourg were later constructed according to his system. After seeing Montalembert's coastal forts, American engineer Jonathan Williams acquired a translation of his book and took it to the United States, where it inspired the Second and Third Systems of coastal fortification; the first fully developed example being Castle Williams in New York Harbor which was started in 1807.

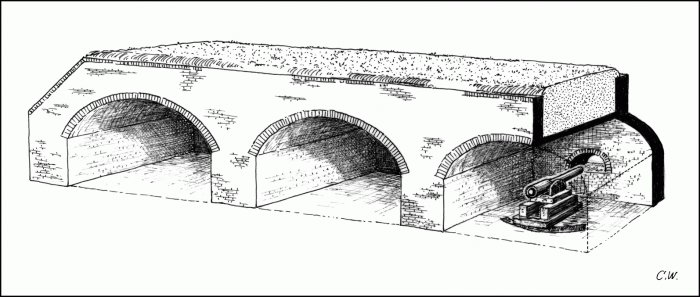
A 19th-century textbook illustration of a triple Haxo casemate

In the early 19th century, French military engineer Baron Haxo designed a free-standing casemate that could be built on the top of the rampart, to protect guns and gunners from the high-angle fire of mortars and howitzers.

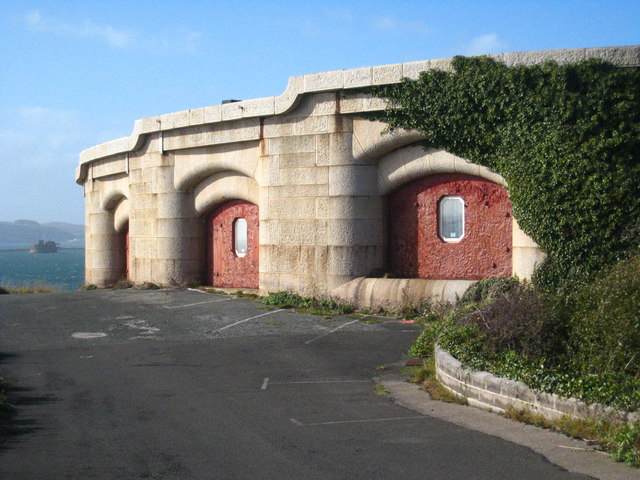
The armored exterior of the 1861 artillery casemates at Fort Bovisand, Plymouth

The advantages of casemated artillery were proved in the Crimean War of 1853–1856, when attempts by the Royal Navy to subdue the casemated Russian forts at Kronstadt were unsuccessful, while a casemated gun tower at Sevastopol, the Malakoff Tower, could only be captured by a surprise French infantry attack while the garrison was being changed. In the early 1860s, the British, apprehensive about a possible French invasion, fortified the naval dockyards of southern England with curved batteries of large guns in casemates, fitted with laminated iron shields tested to withstand the latest projectiles.

However, in the American Civil War (1861–1865), the exposed masonry of casemate batteries proved vulnerable to modern rifled artillery; Fort Pulaski was breached in a few hours by only ten such guns. In contrast, hastily constructed earthworks proved much more resilient. This led to casemates for artillery again falling out of favor. In continental Europe, they were often replaced by rotating gun turrets, but elsewhere, large coastal guns were mounted in less expensive concrete gun pits or barbettes, sometimes using disappearing carriages to conceal the gun except at the moment of firing. Casemates for secure barrack accommodation and storage continued to be built; the 1880s French forts of the Séré de Rivières system for example, had a central structure consisting of two stories of casemates, buried under layers of earth, concrete and sand to a depth of 18 metres (59 ft), intended to defeat the new high explosive shells.

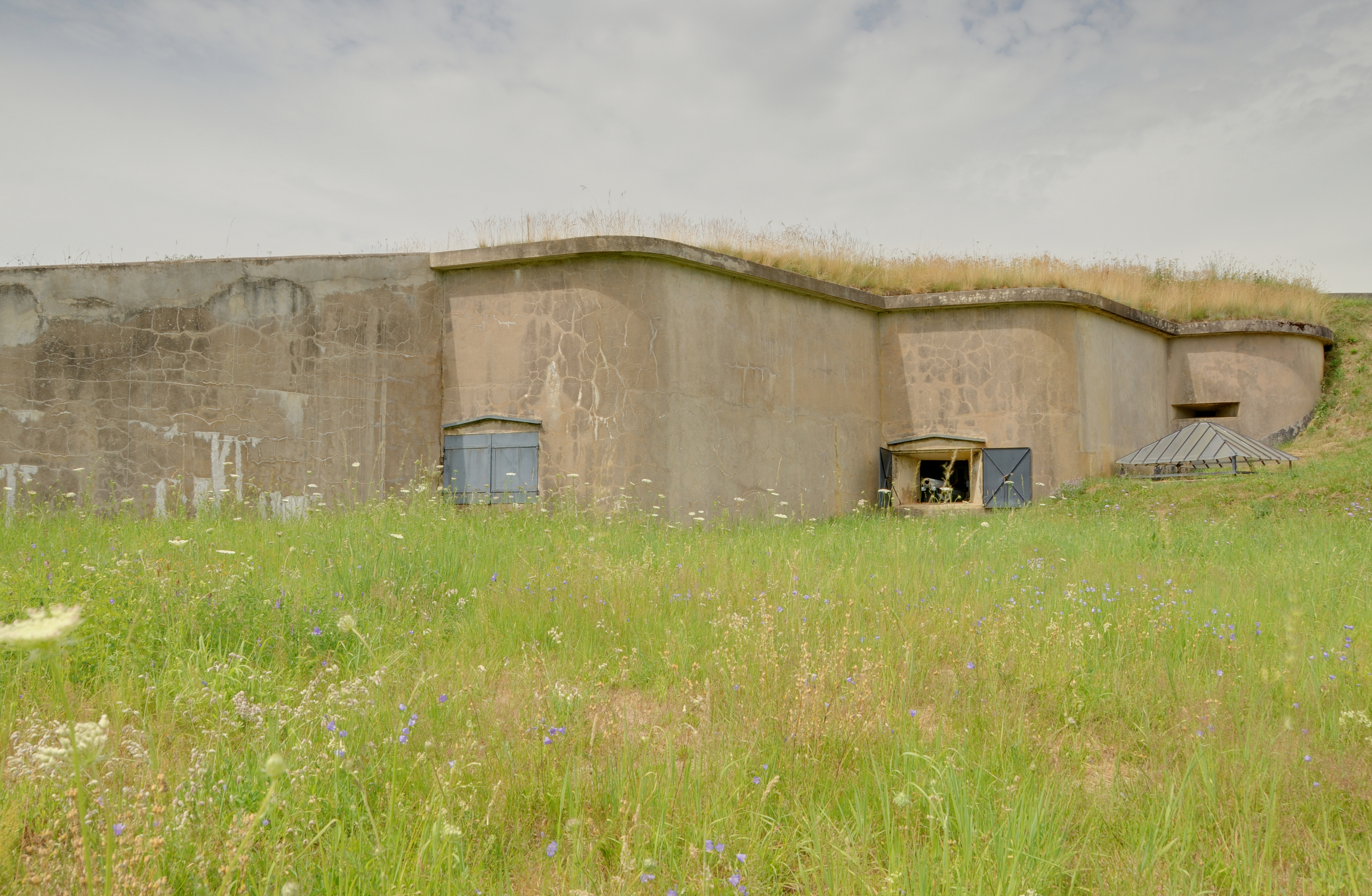
A casemate de Bourges, built in 1910 at Fort d'Uxegney in the Vosges department of eastern France

Towards the end of the century, Imperial Germany had developed a new form of fortification called a feste (German article: Festung#Feste), in which the various elements of each fort were more widely dispersed in the landscape. These works, the first of which was Fort de Mutzig near Strasbourg, had separate artillery blocks, infantry positions, and underground barracks, all built of reinforced concrete and connected by tunnels or entrenchments. Although the main armament of these forts was still mounted in armored turrets, local defense was provided by separate protected positions for field guns; these concrete structures were copied by the French who called them casemates de Bourges (French article: Casemate de Bourges) after the proving ground where they had been tested.

==== 20th century ====
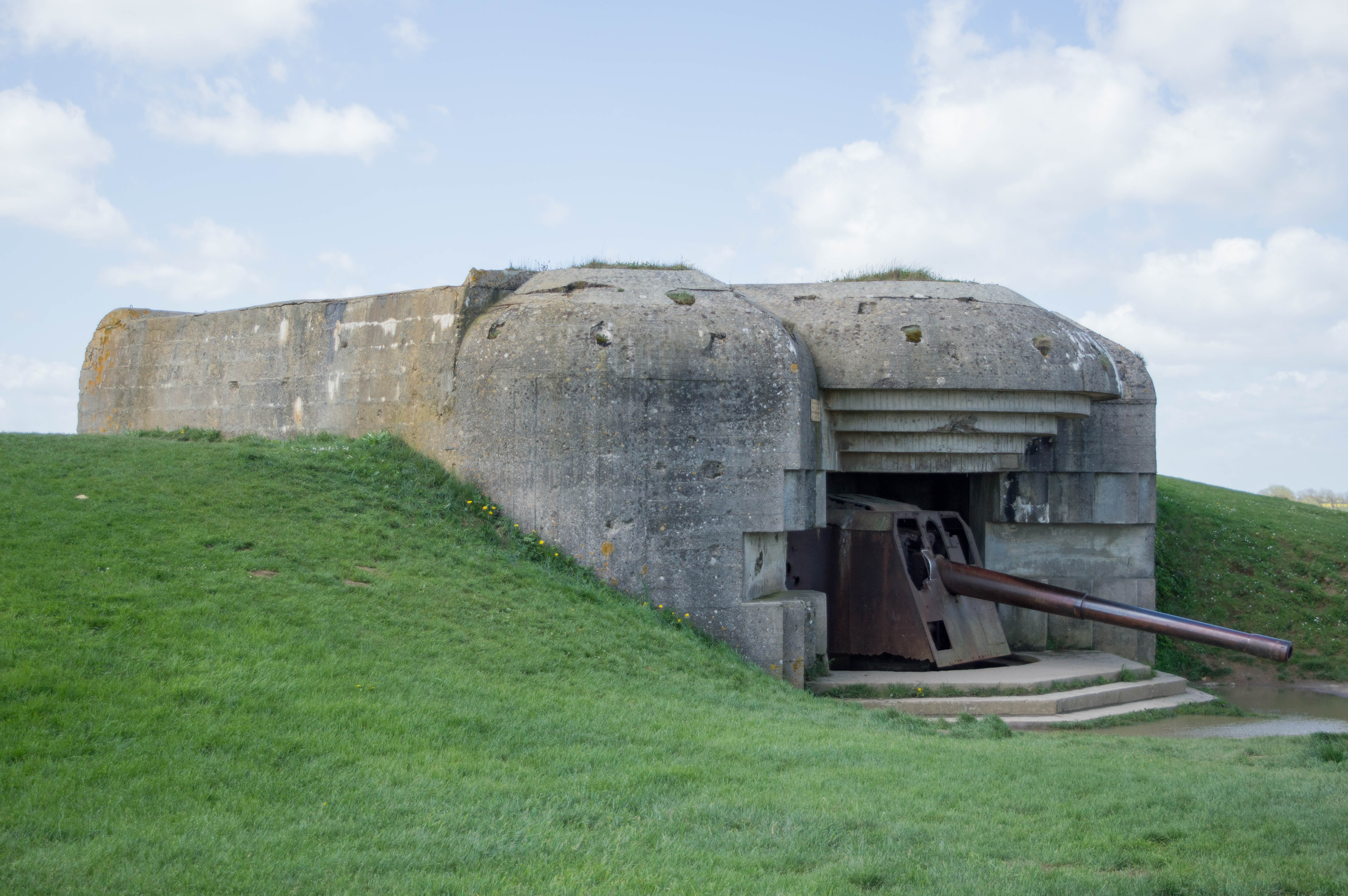
A 1943 German casemate for a 15 cm naval gun at Longues-sur-Mer battery, Normandy

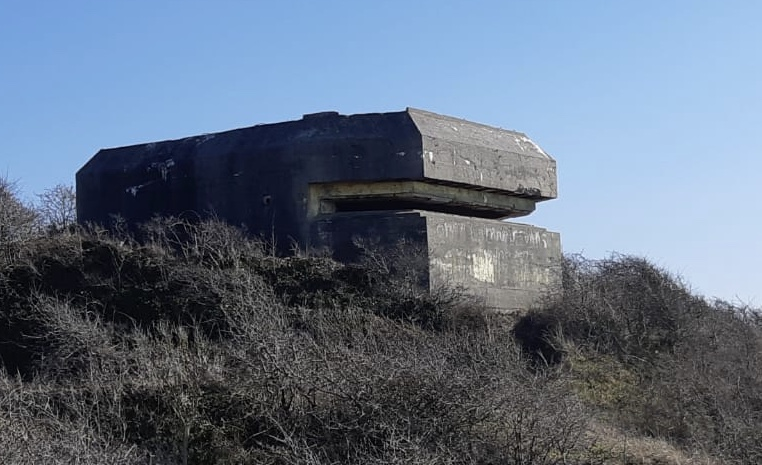
Casemate south of Le Touquet, France

Following experience gained in World War I, French engineers began designing a new system of fortifications to protect their eastern border, which became known as the Maginot Line. The main element of this line were large underground forts based on the feste principle, whose main armament was in turrets, however the countryside between them was defended by smaller self-sufficient works based on the earlier casemates de bourges, housing either light field guns or anti-tank guns. As World War II approached, other European nations adopted similar casemate designs as they offered protection from attacking aircraft. The German Organisation Todt undertook the development of casemates for the large coastal guns of the Atlantic Wall. Built of concrete up to 10 metres (33 ft) thick, they were thought to be able to withstand any form of attack. Work by the Western Allies to develop countermeasures that could defeat casemates and other types of bunkers resulted in weapons such as tank-mounted spigot mortars, rocket-assisted projectiles, recoilless rifles, various types of demolition charge and earthquake bombs.

=== Naval ===
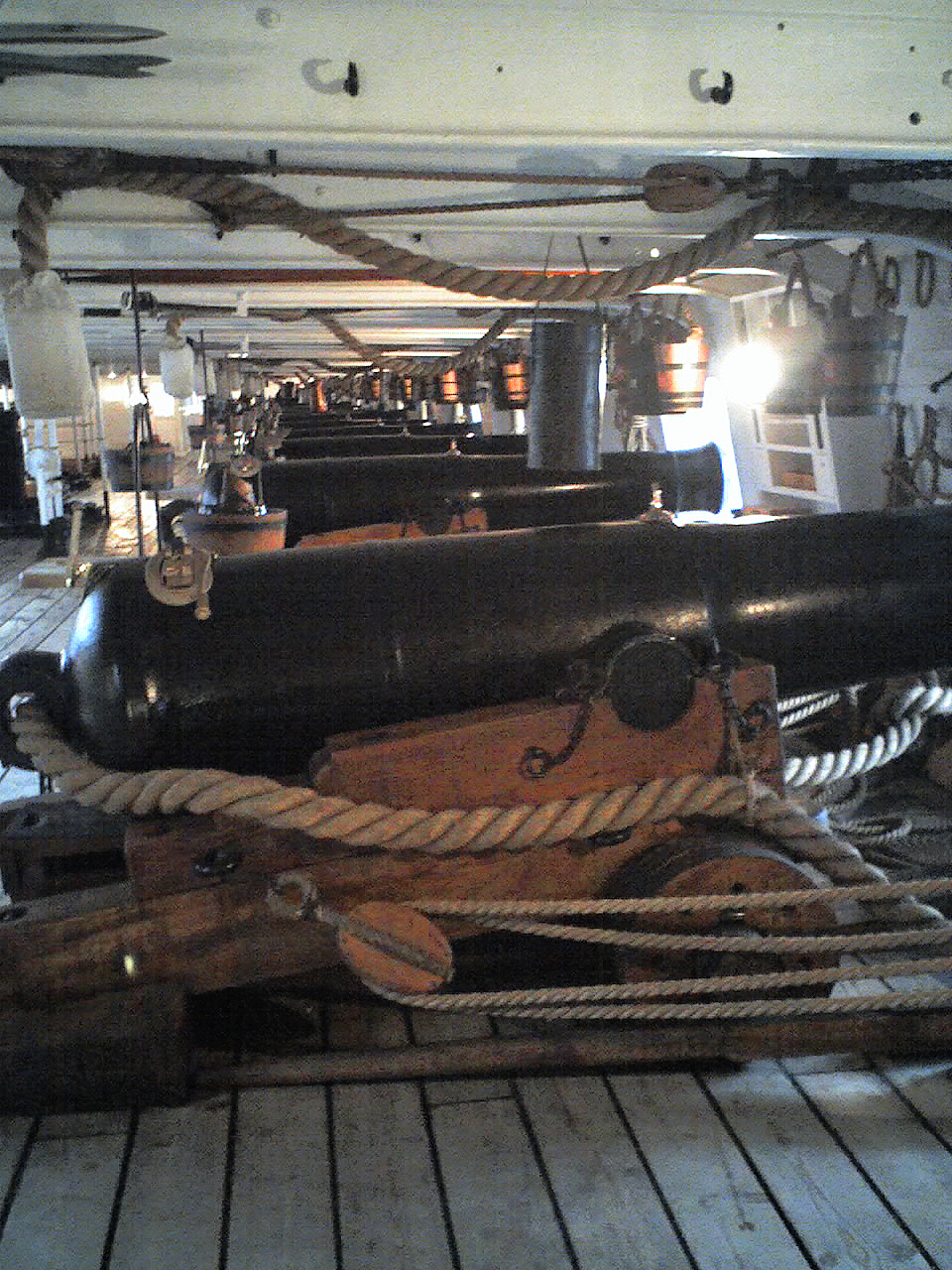
Inside the casemate or "citadel" of HMS Warrior (1860)

In warship design, the term "casemate" has been used in several ways, but it generally refers to a protected space for guns within a ship's hull or superstructure.

The first ironclad warship, the French ironclad Gloire (1858), was a wooden steamship whose hull was covered with armored plating, tested to withstand the largest smoothbore guns available at the time. The response by the British Royal Navy to this perceived threat was to build an iron-hulled frigate, HMS Warrior (1860). However, it was realised that to armor all of the hull to fully withstand the latest rifled artillery would make it unfeasibly heavy, so it was decided to create an armored box or casemate around the main gun deck, leaving the bow and stern unarmored.

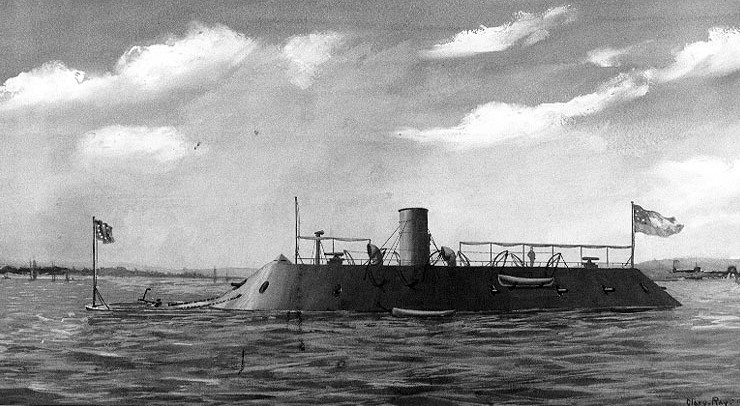
CSS Virginia (1862) showing the casemate mounted on the very low main deck.

The American Civil War saw the use of casemate ironclads: armored steamboats with a very low freeboard and their guns on the main deck ('Casemate deck') protected by a sloped armoured casemate, which sat atop the hull. Although both sides of the war used casemate ironclads, the ship is mostly associated with the Confederate States Navy, as the United States Navy employed turreted monitors, which the Confederacy failed to produce. The most famous naval engagement of the war was the Battle of Hampton Roads between the turreted ironclad USS Monitor and the casemate ironclad CSS Virginia (built from the scuttled remains of USS Merrimack).

"Casemate ship" was an alternative term for "central battery ship" (UK) or "center battery ship" (US). The casemate (or central battery) was an armored box that extended the full width of the ship, protecting many guns. The armored sides of the box were the ship's sides, or hull. There were armored bulkheads at the front and rear of the casemate, and a thick deck protecting the top. The lower edge of the casemate sat on top of the ship's belt armour. Some ships, such as HMS Alexandra (laid down 1873), had a two-story casemate.

A "casemate" was an armored room in the side of a warship, from which a gun would fire. A typical casemate held a 6-inch gun, and had a 4-to-6-inch (102 to 152 mm) front plate (forming part of the side of the ship), with thinner armor plates on the sides and rear, with a protected top and floor, and weighed about 20 tons (not including the gun and mounting). Casemates were similar in size to turrets; ships carrying them had them in pairs, one on each side of the ship.

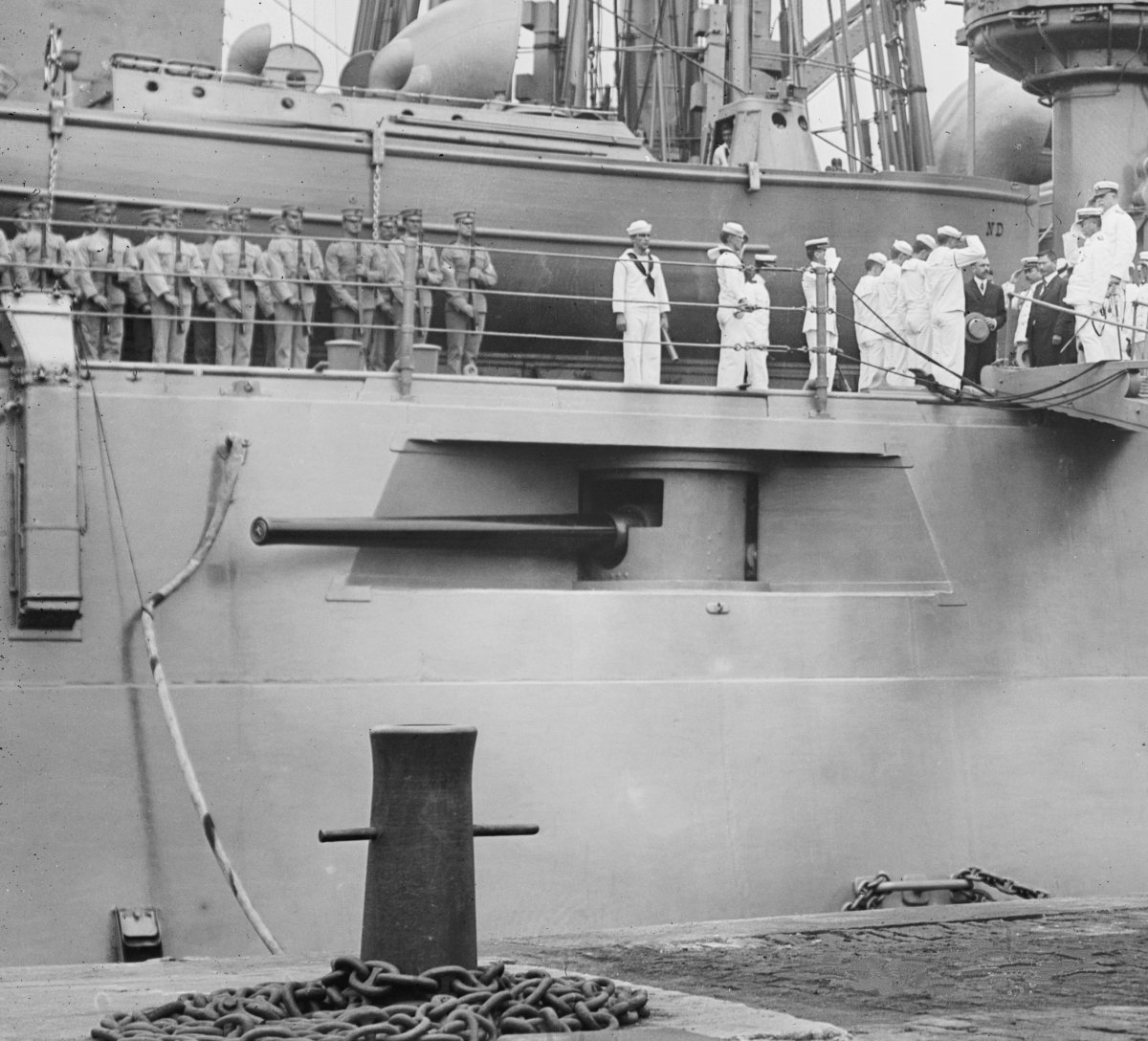
Casemate-mounted 5"/50 caliber gun on USS North Dakota

The first battleships to carry them were the British Royal Sovereign class laid down in 1889. They were adopted following live-firing trials against HMS Resistance in 1888. Casemates were adopted because it was thought that the fixed armor plate at the front would provide better protection than a turret, and because a turret mounting would require external power and could therefore be put out of action if power were lost – unlike a casemate gun, which could be worked by hand. The use of casemates enabled the 6-inch guns to be dispersed, so that a single hit would not knock out all of them. Casemates were also used in protected and armored cruisers, starting with the 1889 Edgar class and retrofitted to the 1888 Blake class during construction.

In the pre-dreadnought generation of warships, casemates were placed initially on the main deck, and later on the upper deck as well. Casemates on the main deck were very close to the waterline. In the Edgar-class cruisers, the guns in the casemates were only 10 feet (3.0 m) above the waterline. Casemates that were too close to the waterline or too close to the bow (such as in the 1912 Iron Duke-class dreadnoughts) were prone to flooding, making the guns ineffective.

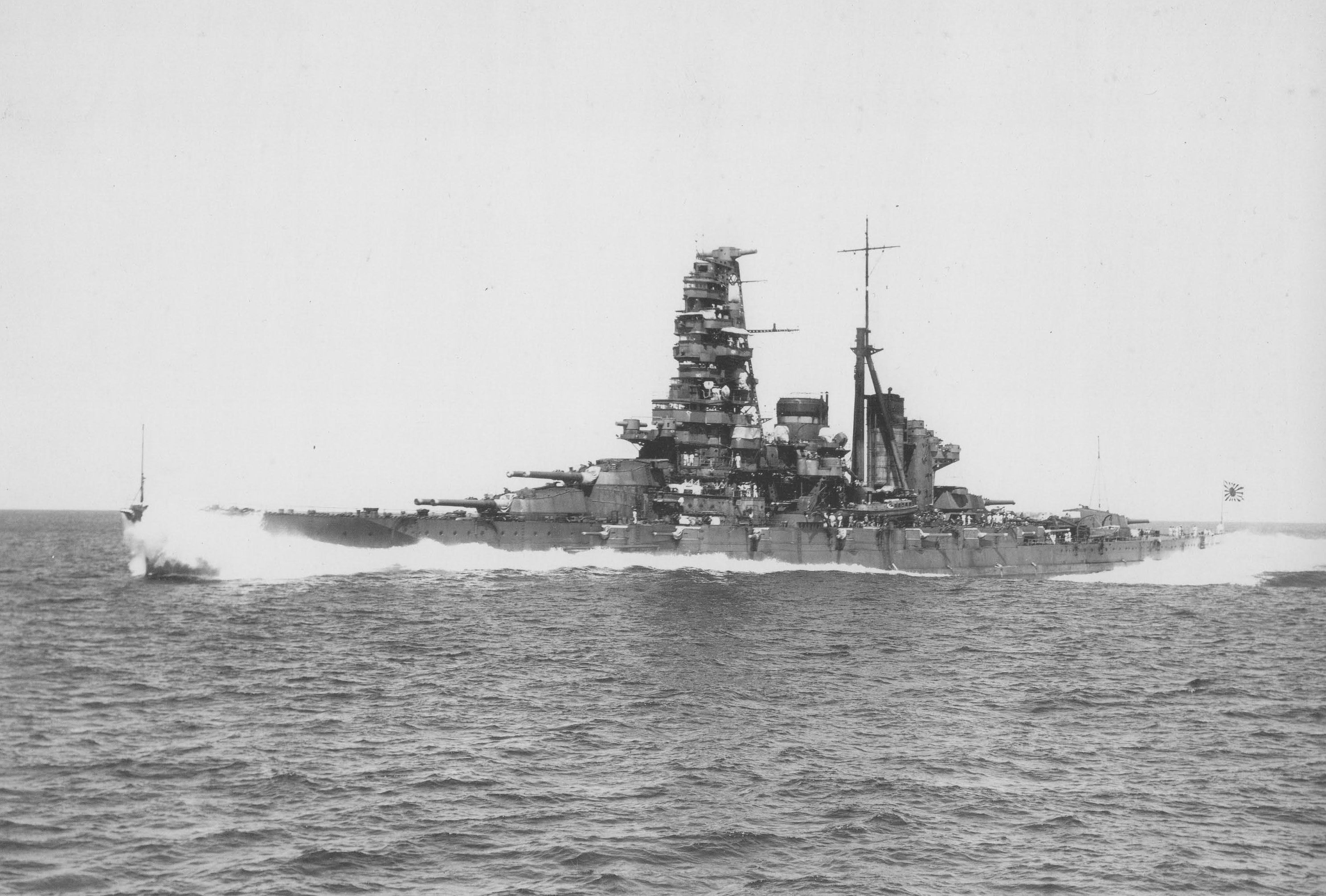
Casemates on the Japanese battleship Haruna, showing their vulnerability to flooding

Shipboard casemate guns were partially rendered obsolete by the arrival of "all-big gun" battleship and battlecruiser, pioneered by HMS Dreadnought and Invincible, respectively, who carried their main guns in turrets and secondary armament upon the superstructure in exposed single mounts. Casemates would be quickly reintroduced in succeeding battleship and battlecruiser classes for secondary armament due to the increasing torpedo threat from destroyers.

Many World War I-era battleships that remained in service had their casemates plated over during modernization in the 1930s (or after the Attack on Pearl Harbor, in the case of US vessels), but some, like HMS Warspite, carried them to the end of World War II. The last ships built with casemates as new construction were the American Omaha-class cruisers of the early 1920s and the 1933 Swedish aircraft cruiser HSwMS Gotland. In both cases, the casemates were built into the forward angles of the forward superstructure (and, in the Omahas, the aft superstructure as well).

=== Armoured vehicles ===
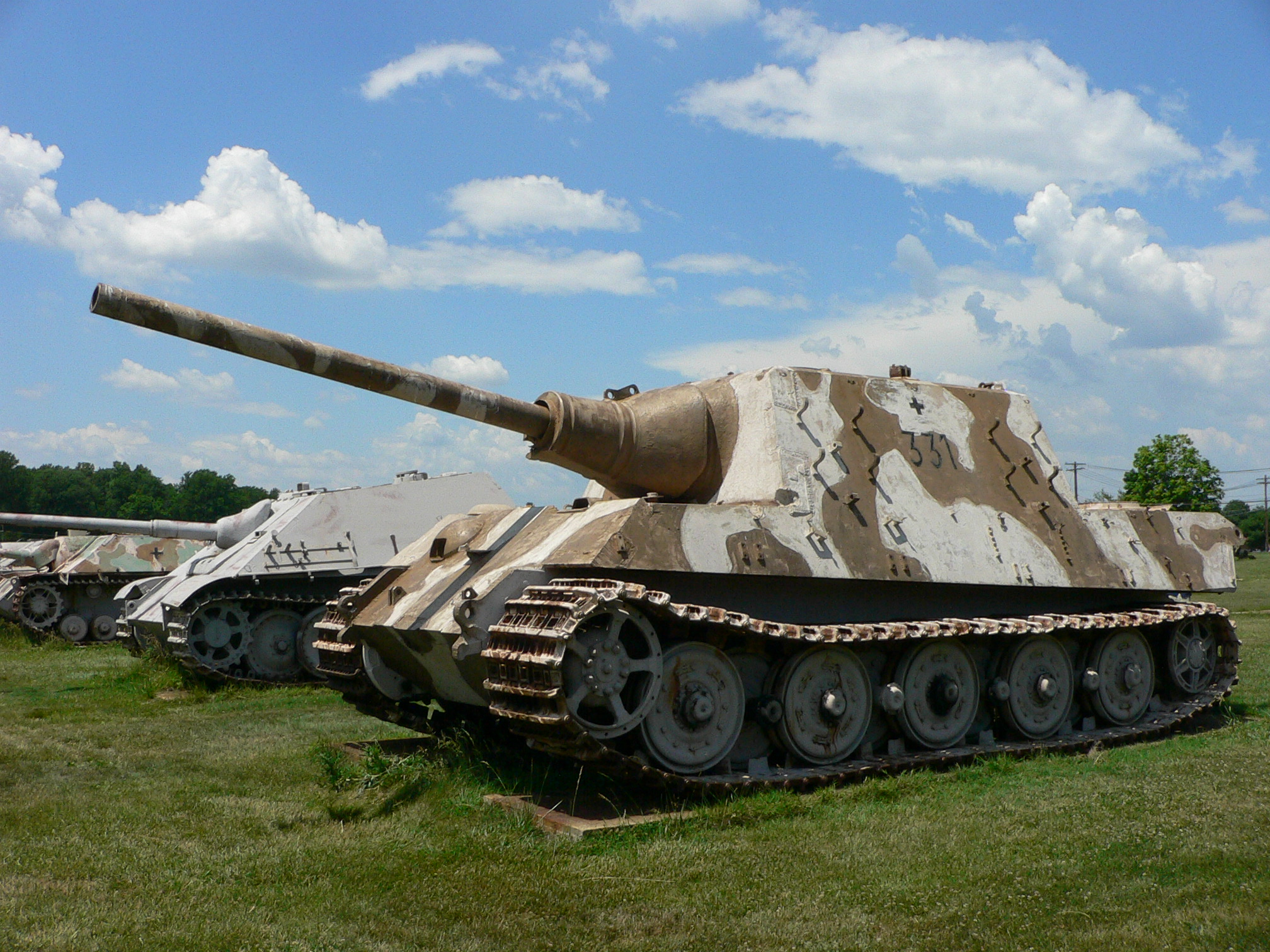
A Jagdtiger, an example of a casemate armoured vehicle

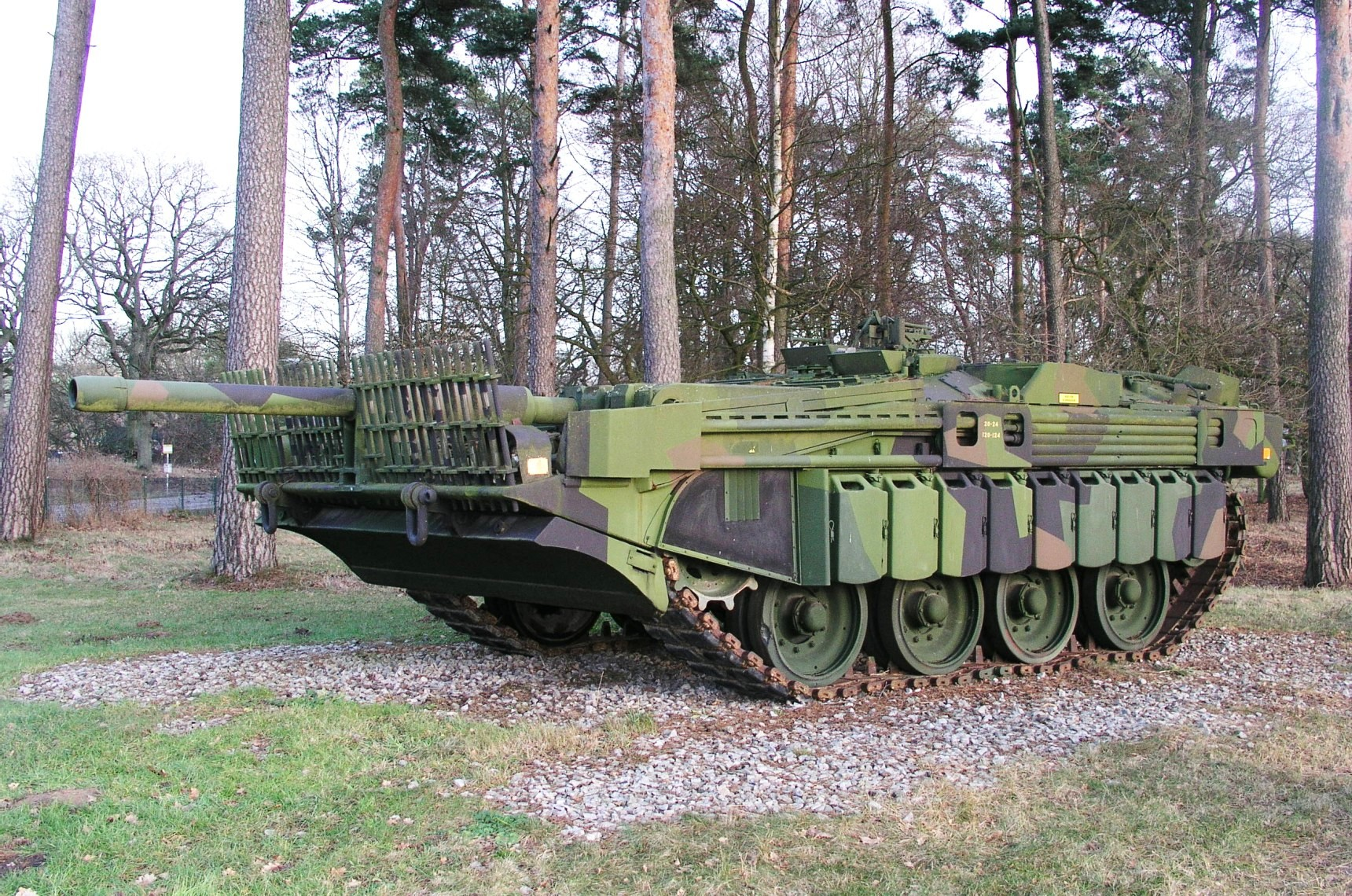
The Swedish Strv 103 was used until the 1990s

In armored fighting vehicles, casemate design refers to vehicles that mount their main gun directly within the hull and lack the rotating turret commonly associated with tanks. Such a design generally makes the vehicle mechanically simpler in design, less costly in construction, lighter in weight and lower in profile. The saved weight can be used to mount a heavier, more powerful gun or to increase the vehicle's armor protection compared to regular, turreted tanks. However, in combat, the crew must rotate the entire vehicle if an enemy target appears outside its limited gun traverse arc. This can prove very disadvantageous in combat situations.

During World War II, casemate-type armored fighting vehicles were heavily used by both the combined German Wehrmacht forces and the Soviet Red Army. They were mainly employed as tank destroyers and assault guns. Tank destroyers, intended to operate mostly from defensive ambush operations, did not need a rotating turret as much as offensively used tanks, while assault guns were mainly used against fortified infantry positions and could afford a longer reaction time if a target presented itself outside the vehicle's gun traverse arc. Thus, the weight and complexity of a turret were considered unnecessary and could be saved for more capable guns and armor. In many cases, casemate vehicles would be used as both tank destroyers or assault guns, depending on the tactical situation. The Wehrmacht employed several casemate tank destroyers, initially with the still-Panzerjäger designation Elefant with an added, fully enclosed five-sided (including its armored roof) casemate atop the hull, with later casemate-style tank destroyers bearing the Jagdpanzer (literally 'hunting tank') designation, with much more integration of the casemate's armour with the tank hull itself. Examples are the Jagdpanzer IV, the Jagdtiger and the Jagdpanther. Assault guns were designated as 'Sturmgeschütz', like the Sturmgeschütz III and Sturmgeschütz IV. In the Red Army, casemate tank destroyers and self-propelled guns bore an "SU-" or "ISU-" prefix, with "SU-" an abbreviation for Samokhodnaya Ustanovka, meaning "self-propelled gun". Examples are the SU-100 or the ISU-152. Both Germany and the Soviet Union mainly built casemate AFVs by using the chassis of existing turreted tanks rather than designing them from scratch.

While casemate AFVs played a very important role in World War II (the Sturmgeschütz III, for example, was the most numerous armored fighting vehicle of the German Army during the entire war), they became much less common in the post-war period. Heavy casemate tank destroyer designs such as the US T28 and the British Tortoise never went beyond prototype status, while casemate vehicles of a more regular weight, such as the Soviet SU-122-54, saw only very limited service. The general decline of casemate vehicles can be seen in technological progress, which led to the rise of universal main battle tanks, unifying the capability to take on roles and tasks that, in the past, had to be divided among several classes of vehicles. However, vehicles such as the German Kanonenjagdpanzer of the 1960s still let the casemate concept live on, while the Swedish Army went as far as employing a casemate tank design, the Stridsvagn 103, or "S-Tank", as their main armored fighting vehicle from the 1960s until the 1990s, favoring it over contemporary turreted designs. Other casemate design ideas, such as the projected German Versuchsträger 1–2 with two main guns, were developed even later.

== See also ==
- Bunker
- Fortification
- Gun turret
- Pillbox (military)
