= Blake-class cruiser =

1891 class of British protected cruisers

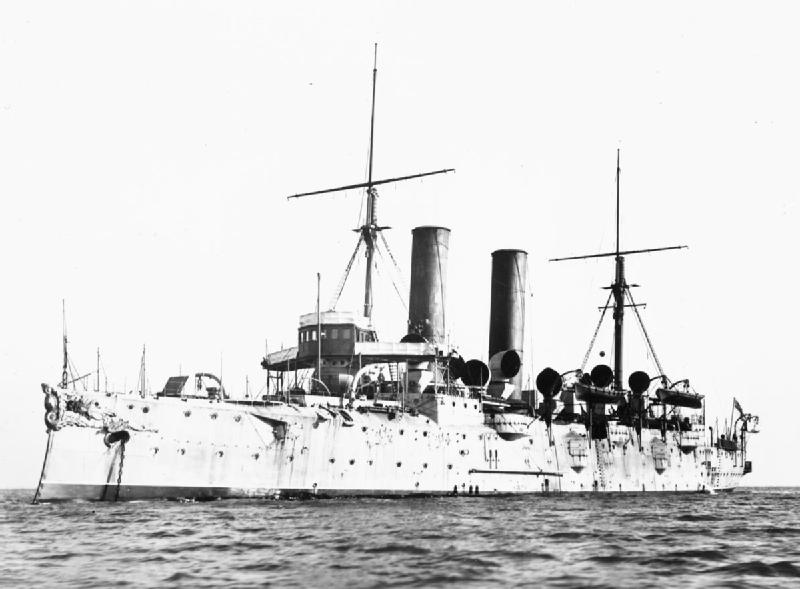
- HMS Blenheim

Class overview
- Name: Blake class
- Operators: Royal Navy
- Preceded by: Orlando class
- Succeeded by: Edgar class
- Built: 1888–1894
- In commission: 1891–1926
- Completed: 2
- Retired: 2

General characteristics
- Type: First class protected cruiser
- Displacement: 9,150 long tons (9,297 t)
- Length: 399 ft 9 in (121.84 m) oa; 375 ft (114.30 m) pp
- Beam: 65 ft (19.81 m)
- Draught: 24 ft (7.32 m)
- Propulsion: 2 shafts; 3 cylinder triple expansion steam engines; 8 boilers; 13,000 ihp (9,700 kW) natural draught, 20,000 ihp (15,000 kW) forced draught
- Speed: 20 kn (37 km/h; 23 mph) natural draught; 22 kn (41 km/h; 25 mph) forced draught
- Capacity: 1800 tons coal
- Complement: 570
- Armament: 2 × BL 9.2-inch (234 mm) Mk VI guns; 10 × QF 6-inch (152 mm) guns; 16 × QF 3-pounder (47 mm) Hotchkiss guns; 4 × 14-inch (356 mm) torpedo tubes
- Armour: Deck: 3–6 in (76–152 mm); 9.2 inch gunshields: 4.5 in (110 mm); Conning tower: 12 in (300 mm)

The Blake class was a pair of first-class protected cruisers, the first of their rank in the Royal Navy, designed in the late 1880s and built around 1890.

== Design ==
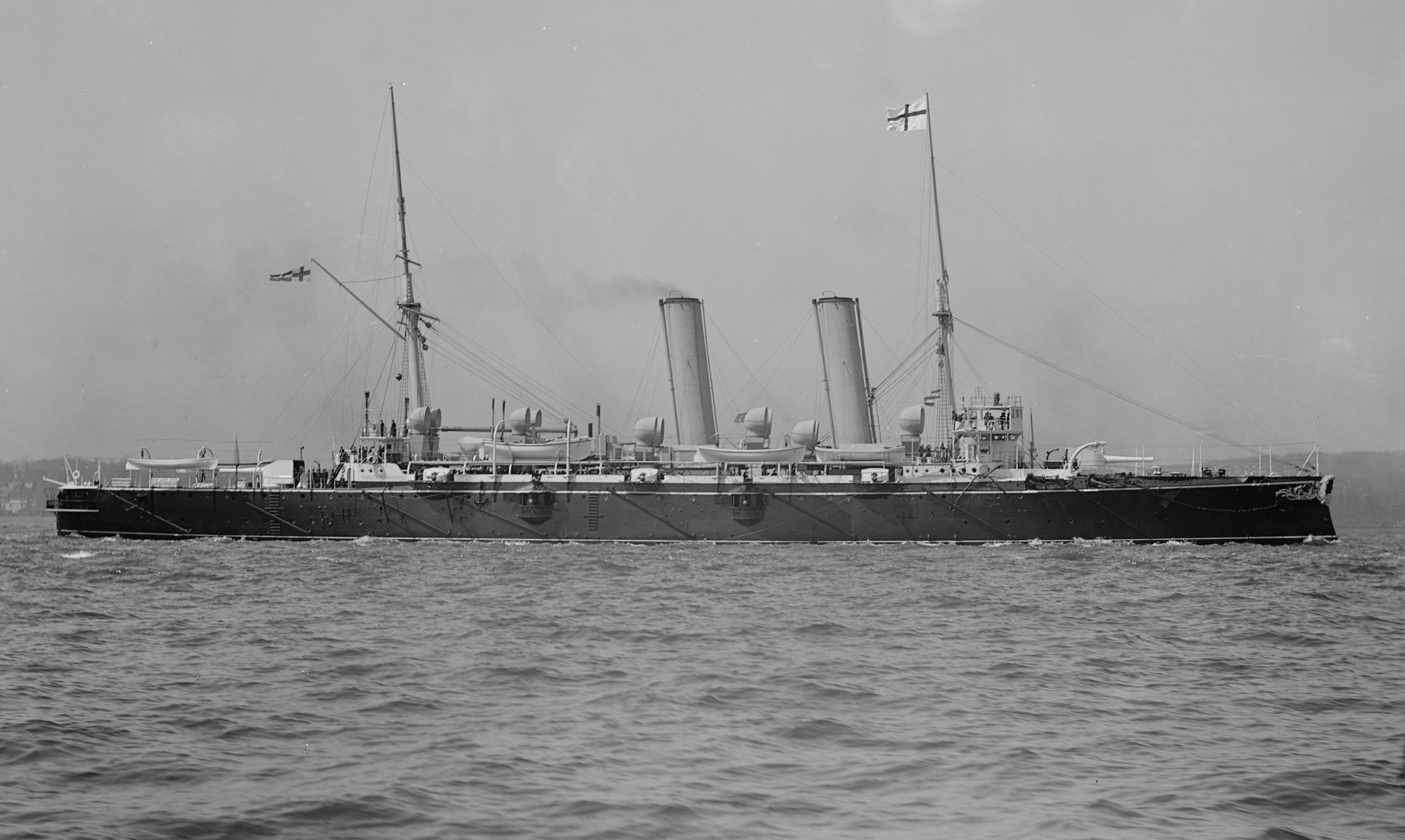
HMS Blake visiting the United States in the 1890s

The Blakes were designed under the supervision of William White, shortly after he had become Director of Naval Construction. They were planned to combine the role of trade protection with the ability to operate with the fleet when required. As such, the design requirement combined high speed and long range. Unlike the preceding class of large cruisers in the Royal Navy, the Orlandos (which were 'belted' or armoured cruisers), the new class were protected cruisers, with protection afforded to their vital internal spaces by a full-length armoured deck, with no vertical armour belt fitted. They were also the ships for which the 'first-class cruiser' designation was created by the Royal Navy. This was due to their superlative nature, being much larger, faster and more powerful than any preceding design. All existing cruisers in the Royal Navy were re-rated in light of this new designation.

Main gun armament was similar to that of the Orlandos, consisting of two 9.2 in (234 mm) Mark VI breech loading guns mounted in single mounts fore and aft on the ship's centreline, and ten single 6 in (152 mm) QF guns, all on broadside, of which six were sited on the ships' upper deck (with light open-backed gunshields) and the remaining four were mounted in armoured casemates on the ships' main deck. This dispersed arrangement was chosen to minimise the risk of one shell hit disabling multiple guns at once, a feature seen also in the contemporary Royal Sovereign-class battleships (which the Blake class were essentially cruiser counterparts of). Secondary armament consisted of sixteen 3 pounder guns. Four 14 inch torpedo tubes completed the ships' armament, with two submerged tubes and two above the waterline.

The arched protective deck was at approximately the level of the waterline, with a thickness of 3 in (76 mm) on the flat area in the middle and 6 in (152 mm) on the slopes, which joined the hull's sides at the lower edge. The ships' conning tower was protected by 12 in (305 mm) of armour. The 9.2 inch guns were behind large, curved 4.5 in (114 mm)-armoured gunshields while the casemates protecting the main deck 6 inch guns were 6 inches thick.

Machinery consisted of 4 three-cylinder triple expansion engines fed by six double-ended cylindrical boilers and driving two shafts. The engines generated 13,000 indicated horsepower (9,700 kW) under natural draught and 20,000 indicated horsepower (15,000 kW) with forced draught, giving a speed of 22 knots (41 km/h; 25 mph) with forced draught and 20 knots (37 km/h; 23 mph) with natural draught. The forward two engines could be disconnected for longer endurance at low speeds. 1,800 long tons (1,829 t) of coal could be carried, double the fuel of the Orlandos, giving a range of 10,000 nautical miles (19,000 km; 12,000 mi) at 10 knots (19 km/h; 12 mph), which was much less than the 15,000 nautical miles (28,000 km; 17,000 mi) expected.

== Service ==
The two ships were obsolete by the outbreak of the First World War, and served as depot ships. HMS Blenheim had the more active career, supporting the Mediterranean Expeditionary Force at the Battle of Gallipoli, and repatriating three dignitaries to their home countries after their deaths abroad. They were Prince Henry of Battenberg and former Canadian prime ministers Sir John Thompson and Sir Charles Tupper.

== Building Programme ==
The following table gives the build details and purchase cost of the members of the Blake class. Standard British practice at that time was for these costs to exclude armament and stores.

| Ship | Builder | Maker of Engines | Date of | | | Cost according to |
| Ship | Builder | Maker of Engines | Laid Down | Launch | Completion | (BNA 1895) |
|---|---|---|---|---|---|---|
| Blake | Chatham Dockyard | Maudslay | July 1888 | 23 Nov 1889 | 2 Feb 1892 | £440,471 |
| Blenheim | Thames Ironworks | Humphrys | October 1888 | 5 Jul 1890 | 26 May 1894 | £425,591 |

== See also ==
- Carlos V: a Spanish armored cruiser design inspired by the Blake-class cruisers
