= Uxegney =

- Commune
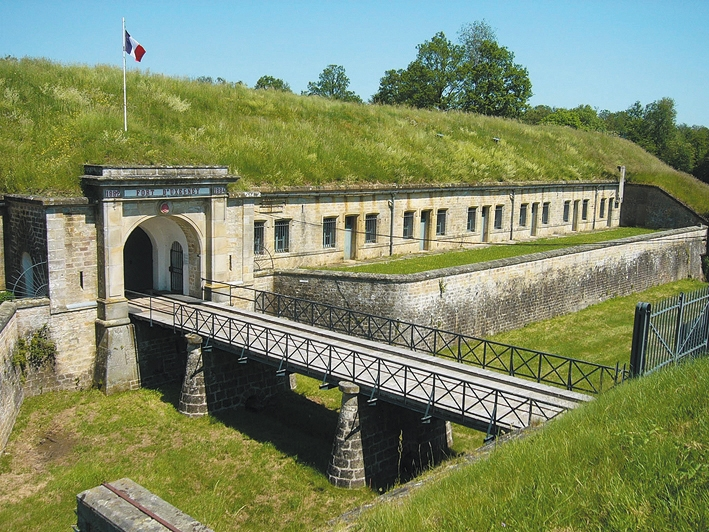
- Fort Uxegney

- Coat of arms
- Location of Uxegney
- Location within France Location within Grand Est
- Coordinates: 48°11′41″N 6°22′15″E
- Country: France
- Region: Grand Est
- Department: Vosges
- Arrondissement: Épinal
- Canton: Golbey
- Intercommunality: CA Épinal

Government
  - Mayor (2020–2026): Philippe Soltys
- Area^{1}: 8.94 km^{2} (3.45 sq mi)
- Elevation: 342 m (1,122 ft)
- Highest elevation: 381 m (1,250 ft)
- Lowest elevation: 329 m (1,079 ft)
- Population (2023): 2,237
  - Density: 250/km^{2} (648/sq mi)
- Time zone: UTC+01:00 (CET)
  - Summer (DST): UTC+02:00 (CEST)
- INSEE/Postal code: 88483 /88390
- ^{1} French Land Register data, which excludes lakes, ponds, glaciers > 1 km^{2} (0.386 sq mi or 247 acres) and river estuaries.

Uxegney (French pronunciation: [yksəɲɛ]) is a commune in the Vosges department in Grand Est in northeastern France.

== Population ==
Historical population
Year	Pop.	±% p.a.
1968	1,074	—
1975	1,352	+3.34%
1982	1,550	+1.97%
1990	1,745	+1.49%
1999	1,905	+0.98%
2007	2,017	+0.72%
2012	2,301	+2.67%
2017	2,294	−0.06%
2023	2,237	−0.42%
Source: INSEE

== See also ==
- Communes of the Vosges department
- Fort d'Uxegney
