= Fort d'Uxegney =

- Part of Séré de Rivières system, Fortified Region of Épinal
- France
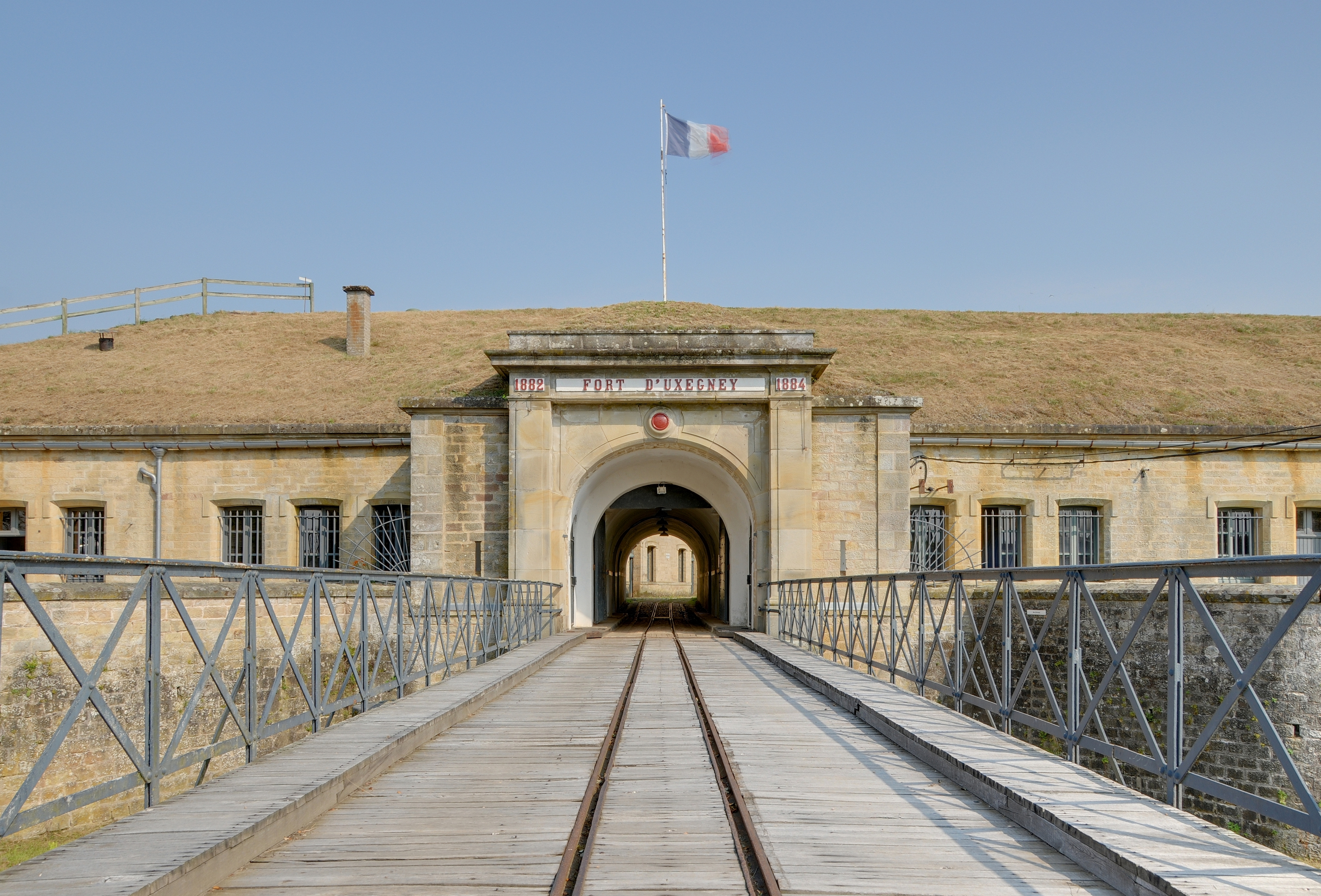
- Entry, Fort d'Uxegney

Site information
- Type: Fort
- Controlled by: France
- Open to the public: Yes

Location
- Coordinates: 48.201707°N 6.384259°E

Site history
- Built: 1882
- Materials: Brick, stone, concrete

The Fort d'Uxegney, or Fort Roussel, is part of the fortifications of Épinal. It was built near the village of Uxegney between 1882 and 1884, and was modernized in 1910. It is an example of a Séré de Rivières system fortification. It retains its armament and is maintained as a museum.

Located 6 kilometres (3.7 mi) northwest of Épinal, the Fort d'Uxegney is part of a 43-kilometre (27 mi) line of sixteen major fortifications designed to bar the advance of a German army into France. It retains a functioning example of an eclipsing Galopin turret. Armed with a 155mm gun, the assembly weighs 250 tons and was installed in 1907. A considerable amount of the fort's equipment remains in place, including kitchens, living facilities and details of armament, in an unusually good state of preservation.

== Description ==
The fort was situated at an altitude of 379 meters above the valley of the Avière with the mission of controlling the Épinal-Mirecourt axis, the Épinal-Nancy railway and the Canal de l'Est. The fort was laid out in a pentagon, surrounded by a ditch. Construction took only two years (1882–1884). The fort includes fortified barracks, storage facilities and magazines, and shelters for troops. The stone buildings of variegated cut stone were built in the open, then covered with earth from the excavation of the ditch and the leveling of the natural terrain. The initial garrison comprised 287 men, and the construction cost of the original fort amounted to about 1.7 million francs.. The principal armament consisted of five 155mm and five 120mm de Bange or Lahotolle guns on the three forward-facing walls of the fort, in the open air on platforms.

The first improvements came in 1892, when the fort's entry, powder magazine, a cistern, an infantry shelter and a number of other spaces were covered with concrete. From 1900 a series of spiral queue de cochon (pig tail-shaped) infantry shelters were placed on and around the fort. The second major phase of work, executed from 1910, completely transformed the fort. A retractable or "eclipsing" turret was installed, mounting a 155mm gun. Another turret mounted two 75mm guns with shortened barrels, and two more turret mounted machine guns. Two casemates de Bourges mounted two 75mm guns in each casemate to cover the intervals between the forts to either side of Uxegney, while armored observation points were created with steel cupolas or cloches. Further concrete reinforcement was placed, while subterranean passages linked all sections of the fort. The defenses were improved with the addition of counterscarp positions in the outer walls of the ditch. A small central electrical plant was installed as well. The cost of these renovations came to 1.2 million francs. The renovated fort's garrison comprised 15 officers, 36 non-commissioned officers and 416 enlisted men.

In 1914 a further project to add two 155mm gun turrets in a separate armored battery was proposed, but was canceled by the outbreak of war.

== History ==
The Fort d'Uxegney saw no action during World War I, as the Germans did not advance into the area around Épinal.

Between World War I and World War II the fort remained military property and was kept under maintenance. Along with the neighboring Fort de Bois l'Abbé, Fort d'Uxegney was used as an ammunition depot.. During World War II the Germans left Uxegney intact even as they stripped other forts around Épinal.

The French army used both forts as ammunition depots until 1960. They were afterwards abandoned.

== Present status ==
Since 1989 the Association pour la Restauration du Fort d'Uxegney et de la Place d'Épinal (ARFUPE) has restored and maintained the Uxegney site. The fort may be visited between May and September. The Fort de Bois l'Abbé was used after 1960 by private tenants, but was restored by ARFUPE beginning in 1995. It may be visited on special occasions.
