= France I (ship) =

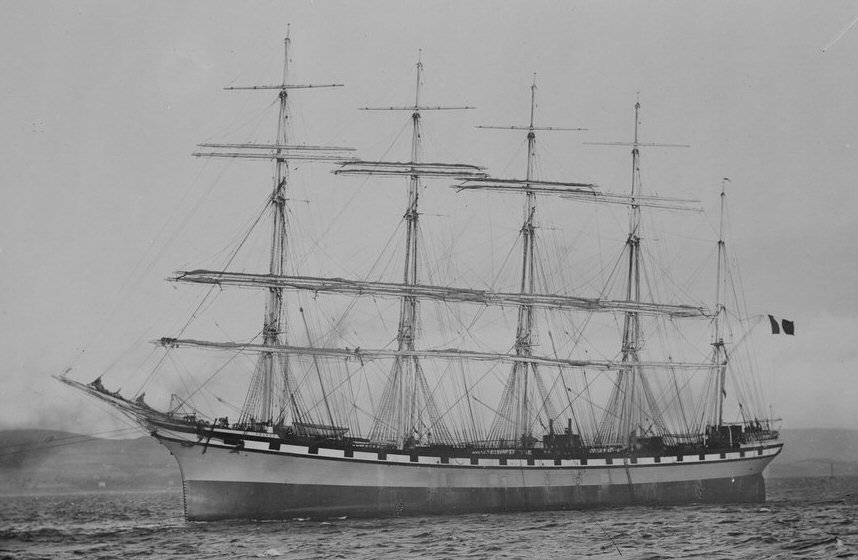
France I

France I (sometimes La France) was one of the largest five-masted barques of its time, with a steel hull and masts, built in 1890 by the Scottish shipyard D. and W. Henderson and Company of Partick, near Glasgow, for the Bordes et fils shipping company of Dunkirk, the leading French fleet of sailing cargo ships that rounded Cape Horn and the second largest in the world at that time.

== History ==
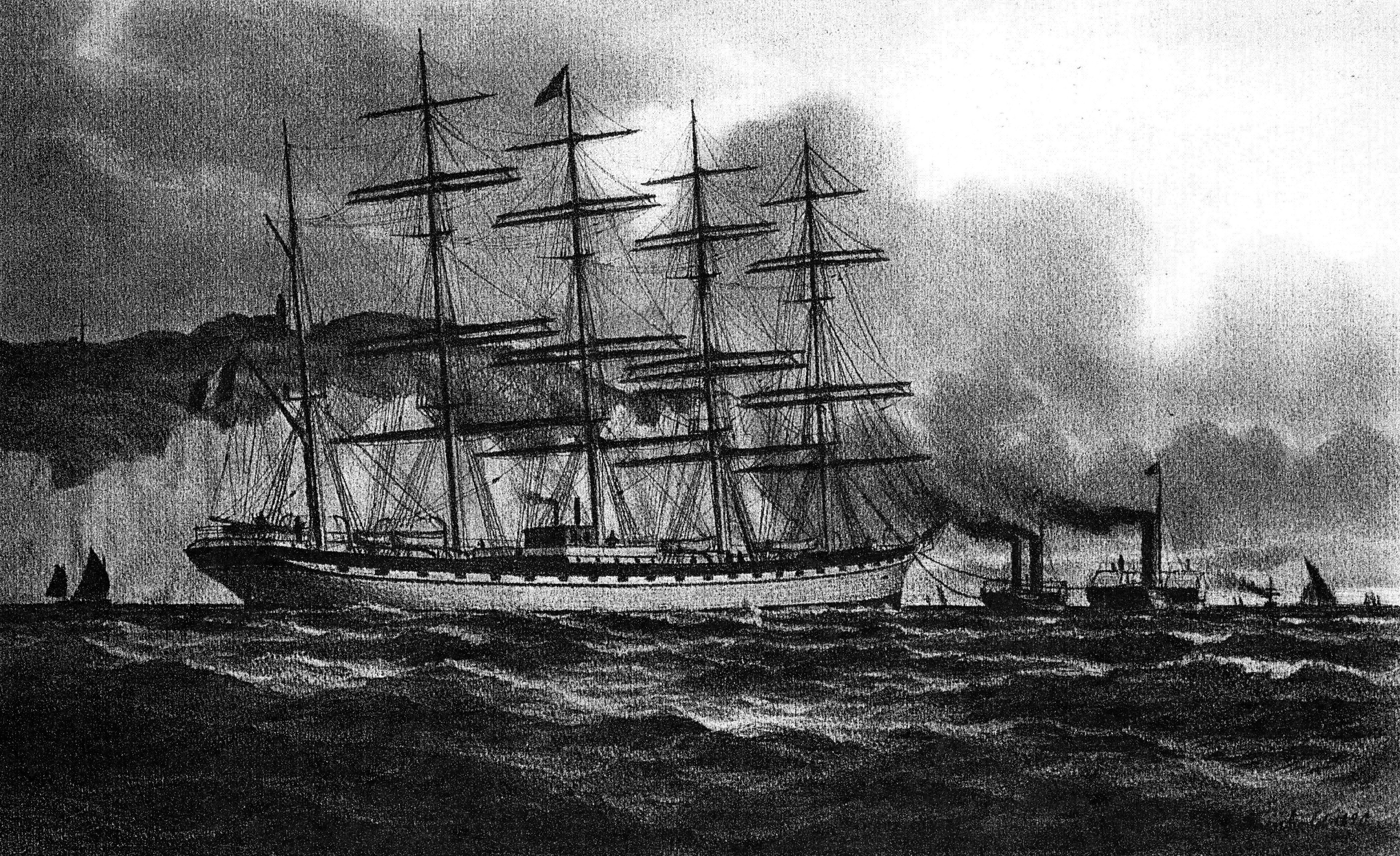
France I, engraving after a painting by Lüder Arenhold (1891).

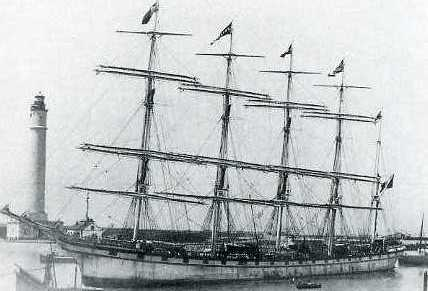
France I in Dunkirk, ca. 1885

France I served the Dunkirk-based company as a cargo ship between Europe and Chile. On its maiden voyage, it transported 5,000 tons of coal to Iquique, Chile, to load 5,500 tons of nitrate. Thanks to its four steam cranes, unloading and loading took only eleven days.

France I was a very fast five-master (five-masted vessel), and made its quickest crossing in 1898, reaching Chile from Prawle Point near Salcombe, England in just 63 days. It subsequently made three voyages on the same route (to the ports of Iquique or Valparaíso), taking less than 80 days for both the outward and return journeys.

According to Basil Lubbock, the ship never loaded its full capacity of 6,200 tons, and gave the appearance of having a low freeboard.

On January 27, 1897, while anchored in the outer roadstead off Dungeness Point, on a clear night, France I was struck by the British cruiser HMS Blenheim. The cruiser had seen the French ship's bow and stern lights, but, believing they belonged to two different fishing vessels, thought it could pass between them. It attempted to steer clear at the last moment, but collided with the French five-masted ship, inflicting substantial damage. The British Admiralty court placed full responsibility for the collision on France I, ruling that the arrangement of its lights was solely to blame. This was a decision that the Bordes shipping company never accepted but was forced to comply with.

In May 1901, during a crossing from South Shields to Valparaíso, France I was struck off the coast of Brazil by a violent pampero storm, which caused its cargo of coal to shift, resulting in an irrecoverable list. The entire crew was able to evacuate the ship before it could completely capsize; they were rescued by the German four-masted barque Hebe II, (Note: 'Unconfirmed' according to the 'clydesite' source, although there are contemporary news items which corroborate this:) (Note: Valparaiso, 11 June 1901: The German vessel HEBE put in here on Sunday to land the crew of the sailing ship FRANCE (1901). The latter encountered rough weather on May 10, and sprang a leak. The cargo shifted to port; the bulwarks were a yard under water, and the ship became unmanageable. ; after three nights and two days' incessant labour the officers and crew decided that it was hopeless to attempt further to save the vessel, which was heeling over at an angle of 45 degrees, and accordingly abandoned her in lat 34S 48W. The HEBE's boat saved 45 of the crew. The boats of the FRANCE were smashed or under water, and the crew lost everything. - Liverpool Journal of Commerce, Thursday, 13 June 1901) owned by the Hamburg-based company B. Wencke Söhne. The ship was last seen, abandoned and listing heavily, by the Spanish barque JOSEFA, on 13 May, three days after. (Note: Montevideo, 22 May 1901: FRANCE (1901), of Dunkirk, Tyne for Valparaiso - JOSEFA of Havana reports 34S 45W, passed FRANCE May 13, 500 miles north of Montevideo abandoned with a list, decks swept. Crew had been taken off. Lussich (company at Montevideo) sending out several tugs searching. -Liverpool Journal of Commerce, Friday, 24 May1901)
