= Saloon =

Saloon may refer to:

== Buildings and businesses ==
- One of the bars in a traditional British pub
- An alternative name for a bar (establishment)
- Western saloon, a historical style of American bar
- The Saloon, a bar and music venue in San Francisco, California, US
- The Saloon (Minneapolis), a gay bar in Minneapolis, Minnesota, US
- A South Asian term for a barber's shop
- The centre room of a suite of state rooms, the drawing room

== Automobiles ==
- Saloon (car), a style of car body also known as a sedan
- Honda Saloon, a pre-production sedan electric car

== Music ==
- Saloon (band), an English indie musical group
- Saloon (album), by metal band The Ongoing Concept

== Ships ==
- A social lounge on a passenger ship
- The officers' mess on a merchant vessel
- The main social cabin of a yacht

== See also ==
- Salon (disambiguation)
