= Kitchen =

Space primarily used for preparation and storage of food

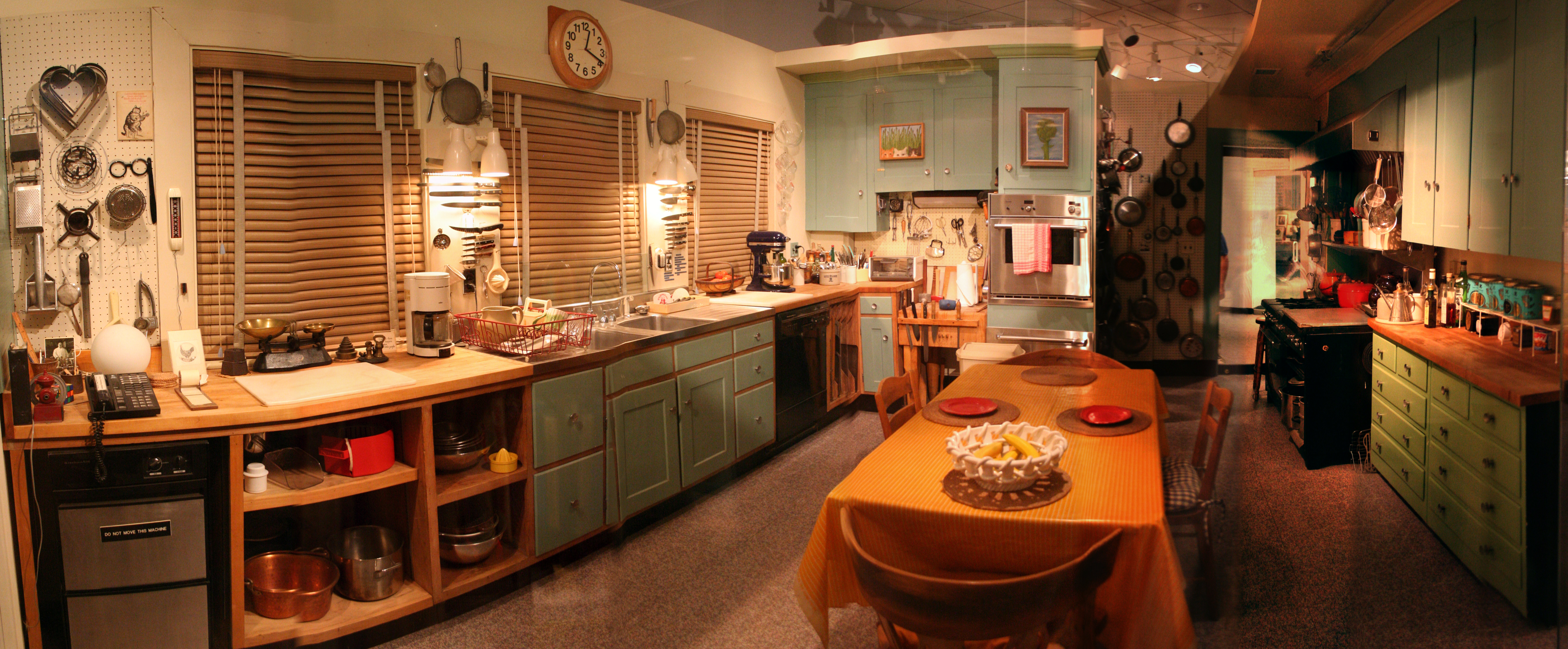
Julia Child's kitchen (1961) from her home in Cambridge, Massachusetts, now displayed at the National Museum of American History

A kitchen is a room or part of a room used for cooking and food preparation in a dwelling or in a commercial establishment. A modern middle-class residential kitchen is typically equipped with a stove, a sink with hot and cold running water, a refrigerator, and worktops and kitchen cabinets arranged according to a modular design. Many households have a microwave oven, a dishwasher, and other electric appliances. The main functions of a kitchen are to store, prepare and cook food (and to complete related tasks such as dishwashing). The room or area may also be used for dining (or small meals such as breakfast), entertaining and laundry. The design and construction of kitchens is a huge market all over the world.

Commercial kitchens are found in restaurants, cafeterias, hotels, hospitals, educational and workplace facilities, army barracks, and similar establishments. These kitchens are generally larger and equipped with bigger and more heavy-duty equipment than a residential kitchen. For example, a large restaurant may have a walk-in refrigerator and a large commercial dishwashing machine. In some instances, commercial kitchen equipment such as commercial sinks are used in household settings as they offer ease of use for food preparation and high durability.

In developed countries, commercial kitchens are generally subject to public health laws. They are inspected periodically by public-health officials, and forced to close if they do not meet hygienic requirements mandated by law.

== History ==
=== Prehistoric and ancient kitchens ===
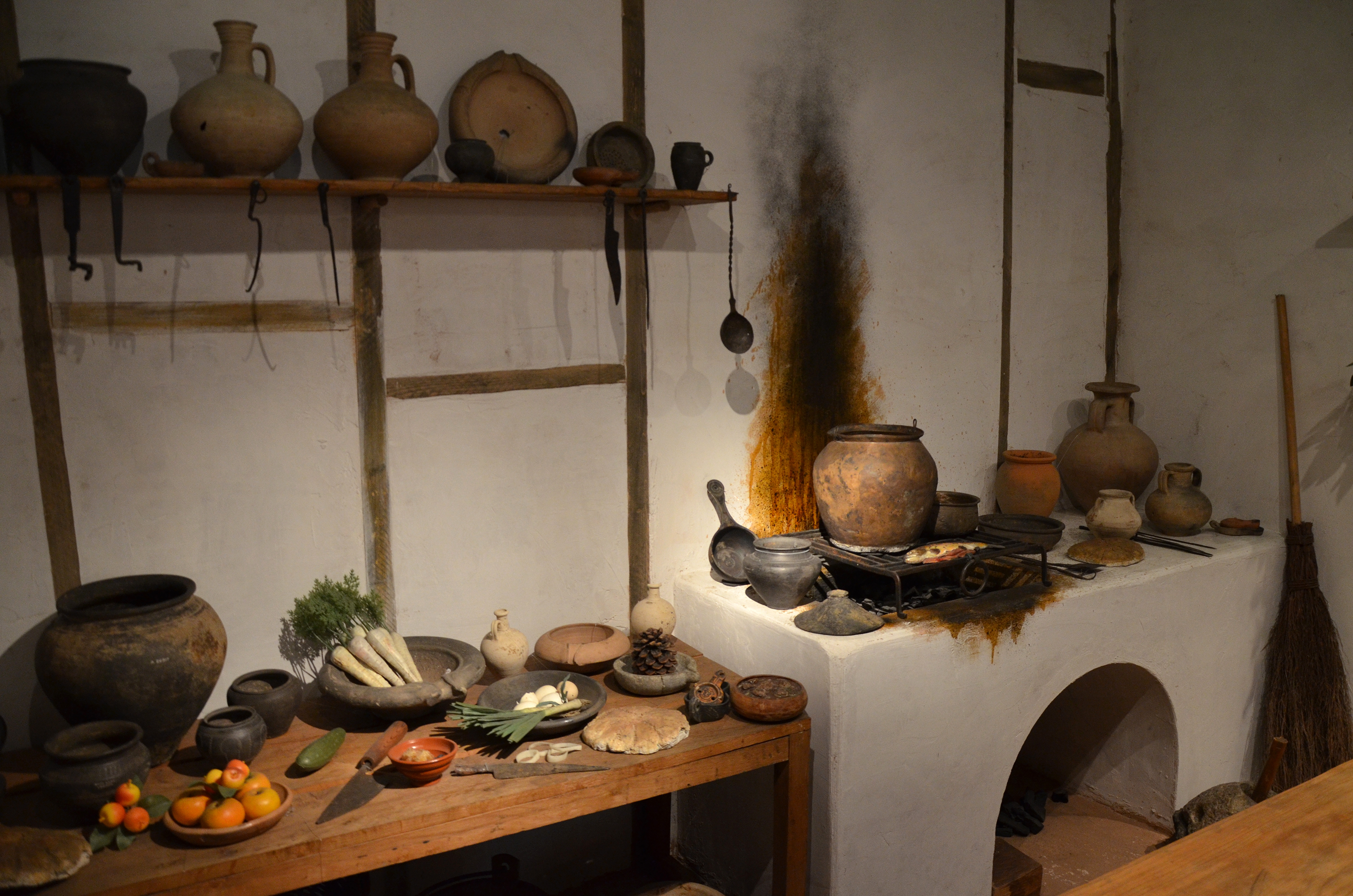
Reconstruction of a Roman kitchen (culina), Museum of London

In early farming settlements, cooking took place inside the dwelling. At the Neolithic town of Çatalhöyük in Anatolia, houses were entered through an opening in the roof, and the hearth and oven sat beneath it, so that the entrance also let out the smoke. In New Kingdom Egypt, the houses of the workmen's village at Deir el-Medina had a kitchen area at the back.

In ancient Greece, most houses had no fixed hearth. Food was usually prepared in the courtyard or its covered porches on portable braziers, so the Greek kitchen was largely movable. Some houses had a dedicated kitchen: at Olynthus in northern Greece, destroyed in 348 BC, nearly half of the excavated houses had a kitchen suite with a room for cooking and heating and a small bathroom next to it. Roman houses more often had a fixed kitchen (culina). In larger houses it was placed at the back or side, out of sight of the reception rooms, since the cooking was done by slaves. At Pompeii, kitchens typically had a masonry hearth or stove built against a wall, with a window above to let out the smoke.

In China, the hearth of Neolithic houses stood near the middle of the room and was gradually moved to a corner, forming a cooking area within the house; a separate kitchen is first attested in the palaces of the Shang dynasty (c. 1600–1046 BC). In the Han dynasty (202 BC – AD 220), kitchens were built around a fixed stove (zao) of adobe or masonry. Few such stoves survive, but large numbers of pottery models, copied from real ones, were placed in Han tombs to provide for the dead in the afterlife. The models show a raised cooking surface, a large fire chamber, several openings for pots, and often a chimney; on real stoves the pots fitted tightly into these openings, making efficient use of the fire. In Japan, the pit dwellings of the Jōmon and Yayoi periods (c. 14,000 BC – AD 300) had an open hearth, often in the center of the house; in the Kofun period (c. 300–538) it was replaced by a built-in clay stove (kamado) set against a side wall, with a chimney leading outside.

In Mesoamerica, households at Joya de Cerén in El Salvador, a village buried by a volcanic eruption in the 7th century AD, consisted of at least three separate buildings: a kitchen, a storehouse, and a dwelling. The kitchen was built apart from the others. In one household it was a circular building with walls of poles and thatch and a thin thatched roof; a three-stone hearth stood in the center, with the heavily worn grinding stone (metate) used for daily food preparation on the floor beside it, and the floor was a layer of volcanic ash that could easily be replaced when spills accumulated.

=== Medieval and early modern kitchens ===
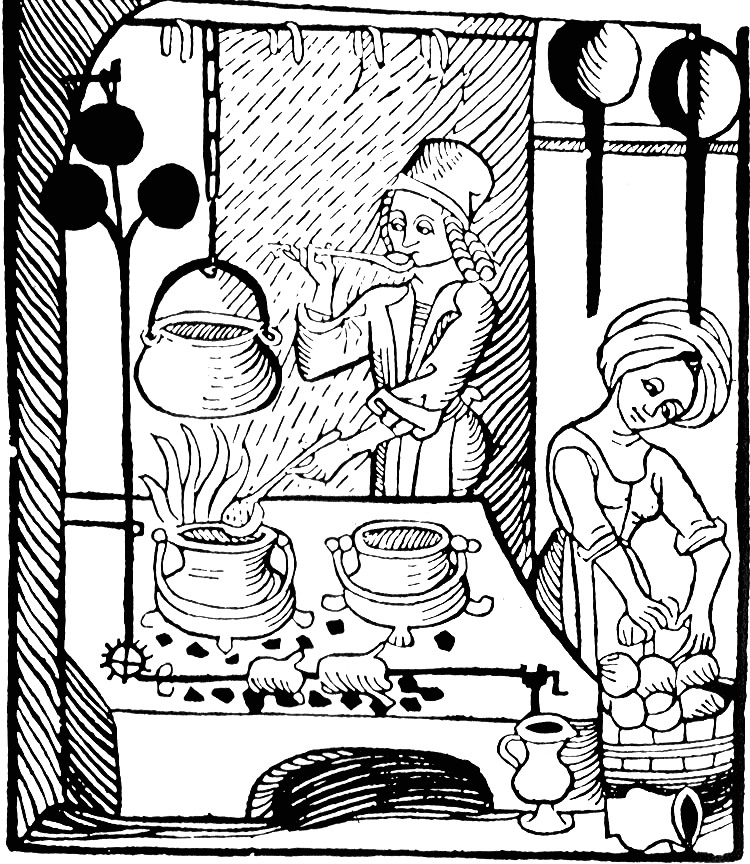
Kitchen with a tiled stove and a roasting spit turned by a propeller (upper left); woodcut from the 1505 Augsburg edition of Kuchenmaistrey, the first cookbook printed in German (1485)

In medieval Britain, homes at every social level, from cottages to great halls, were warmed by a fire on an open hearth at the center of the main room, with the smoke escaping through the thatch or through vents in the roof. In large households the kitchen might be a separate building because of the smoke and the risk of fire. Few medieval kitchens survive, as they were "notoriously ephemeral structures". One that is well documented is the Great Kitchen of the archbishops of Canterbury, put up between about 1200 and 1220: a square building roughly 50 ft (15 m) on each side, standing apart from the great hall to reduce the danger of fire. Chimneys existed from at least the 12th century, but for a long time they were built only for kitchens and the private chambers of wealthy houses; over the 16th century they increasingly replaced open hearths in ordinary homes.

In Renaissance Italy, many modest homes had no separate kitchen, and families cooked over a fire in the middle of the principal room, which also heated the house. Wealthy families tended to put the kitchen on an upper floor or at the rear of the building, to limit the danger of fire and keep its smoke, smells and noise at a distance. They often had more than one kitchen: a large one for banquets and the household, and a smaller private one near the owner's apartments.

Later in the early modern period, once hoods and chimneys had become widespread, the kitchen could be placed anywhere in the house. Households with servants generally moved it away from the family's rooms: below ground in England, into a rear courtyard in France, and into an outbuilding in Poland. In Dutch homes, where few servants were kept, it remained an important and carefully furnished room. Ordinary households were more varied. In London between about 1660 and 1740, cooking might be done in a cellar, a workshop or an upstairs room, and kitchens often opened straight onto the yard.

In colonial New England, kitchens appear in some of the earliest household records: a 1648 inventory from Windsor, Connecticut, lists goods "in the kittchin". In Virginia, the first colonial kitchens were generally inside the house, but by 1724 Hugh Jones observed that planters often kept the kitchen "apart from the dwelling house, because of the smell of victuals, offensive in hot weather". These separate kitchens were worked by enslaved cooks, who often slept in a loft above. According to Michael Olmert, the move had less to do with fear of fire than with slavery, since it kept their labor out of sight of the family and guests.

=== Nineteenth and early twentieth centuries ===
The kitchen of the Reform Club in London, where gas stoves were installed in 1841, in a print of 1842

During the 18th and 19th centuries, the open kitchen fireplace gave way to the cast-iron kitchen range. Improvements to grates and flues, notably by Count Rumford, made fires less smoky and more efficient. Rumford is also credited with the first kitchen ranges to be sold commercially. A range could be kept burning steadily for long periods and supplied a hotplate, an open fire, an oven and hot water from a single fire; even modest homes might have a small one. The search for more economical use of fuel later produced closed cast-iron stoves, which were smaller and easier to use and allowed the cook to regulate the heat. In the United States, cast-iron cookstoves appeared in the early 1800s and spread from the 1830s, burning wood and later coal. A stove gave a stronger, steadier heat than the hearth and made baking easier and less wasteful of fuel. By the middle of the century most families could afford one, although many people still felt that meat roasted at an open fire and bread from a bake oven tasted better.

Gas cooking took hold more slowly, partly because gas was then used mainly for lighting and many gas companies did not allow it to be used during the day. Gas stoves were installed at London's Reform Club in 1841 and shown at the Great Exhibition of 1851, but they remained largely confined to wealthier homes until some gas companies began renting them out, with the cost recovered through coin-operated meters. Piped water, gas and later electricity reached city homes in growing numbers. Even so, until late in the century cooking and cleaning remained heavy manual work, with no source of power beyond the fire. A model electric kitchen was exhibited in 1893, but electric stoves began to enter American kitchens only in 1909. By 1915, thermostats allowed both electric and gas stoves to regulate their own temperature. In the 1920s, a typical American kitchen had a gas stove and an icebox. General Electric's Monitor Top of 1926 was the first all-steel refrigerator, though many households still used an icebox in the 1930s. In the United States, as domestic servants became scarcer, more of the housework fell to the housewife, prompting a search for better-planned kitchens.

=== Efficiency and the work triangle ===
Kitchen plan from Catharine Beecher and Harriet Beecher Stowe's The American Woman's Home (1869)

In the 19th century, Catharine Beecher and her sister Harriet Beecher Stowe proposed a rationally planned kitchen in their household manual The American Woman's Home (1869). Their model house was organized around a central core containing the stairs, closets, toilet, kitchen and stove, together with ducts for heating and ventilation. The kitchen had a continuous countertop at a single height and separated the area for cooking at the stove from the area for food preparation; the Beechers cited the compact kitchens of steamboats as a model.

In the early 20th century, home economics became linked to the broader efficiency movement. Christine Frederick authored The New Housekeeping (1913) and Household Engineering: Scientific Management in the Home (1920), and worked as an editor for the Ladies' Home Journal. As Laurel D. Graham notes, Frederick pioneered the vocation of household engineering through this work. Applying a simplified observational methodology that relied on a clock and the naked eye, Frederick published floor plan diagrams using dotted lines. As quoted by Heidi Overhill, these diagrams showed how a "proper arrangement of equipment" transformed "confused intersecting chains of steps" into what Overhill describes as non-overlapping motion. Industrial engineers Frank and Lillian Gilbreth conducted some motion studies in the household prior to 1924. Following Frank's death, Lillian Gilbreth applied industrial psychology to domestic engineering, emphasizing fatigue reduction and personal satisfaction. In September 1929, Gilbreth's "Kitchen Practical" model, designed for the Brooklyn Borough Gas Company, was first shown at the Woman's Exposition. Across her model kitchens, she promoted an optimized arrangement she termed the "circular work place" and custom-height work surfaces—a feature of adjustability that was sacrificed when manufacturers agreed on standardized 36-inch cabinet heights by 1945. Overhill states that a prototype for the "kitchen work triangle"—a phrase she notes was coined around 1947 by the University of Illinois Building Research Council—may be seen in a diagram by Frederick. Separately, Graham writes that Gilbreth's circular work place was transformed into a work triangle.

=== Fitted kitchens ===
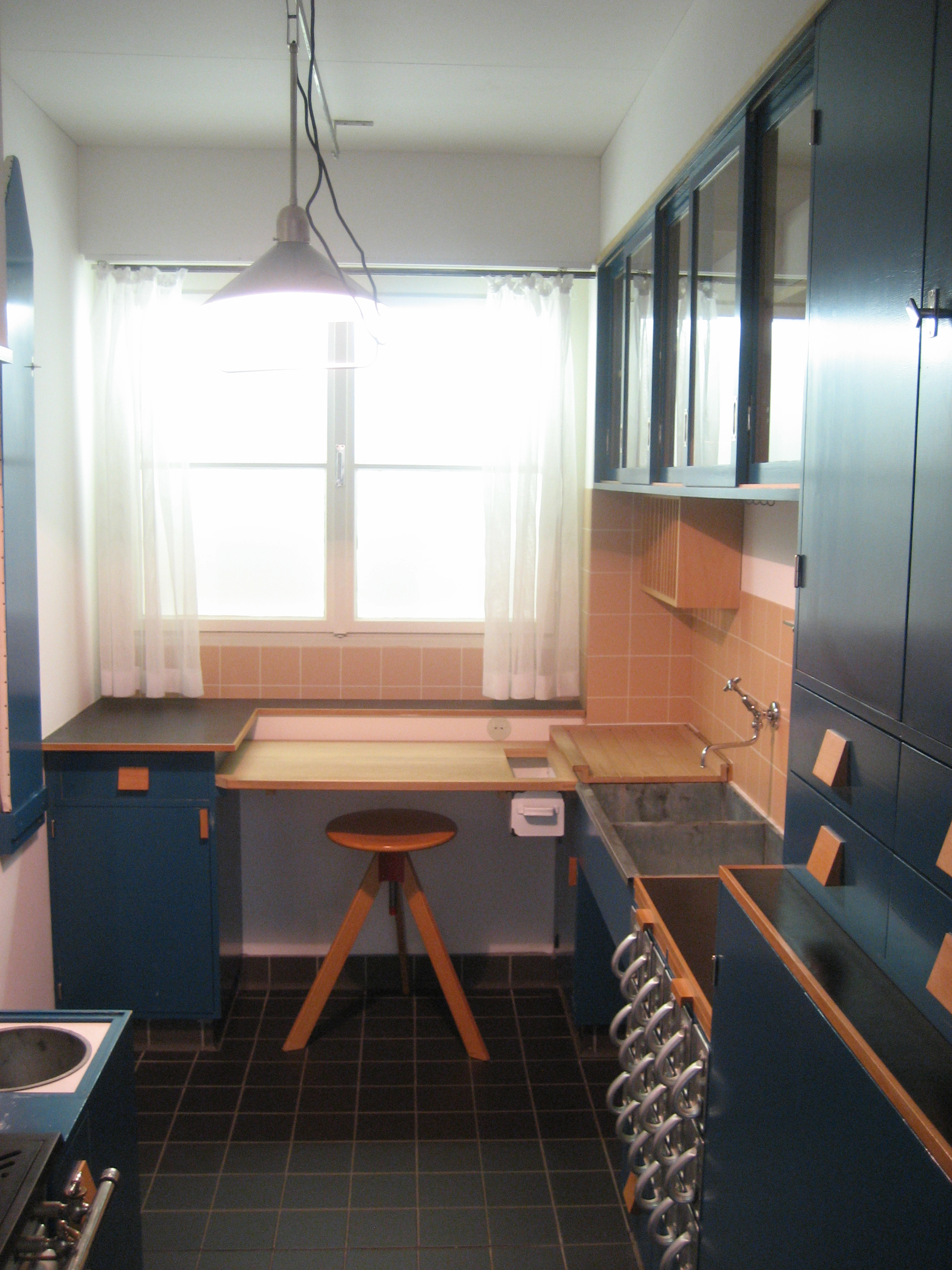
Reconstruction of a Frankfurt kitchen at the Museum of Applied Arts in Vienna

A fitted kitchen is one furnished with matching cabinets and other units built for the room and fixed in place, usually with continuous countertops and appliances built to standard dimensions. According to the design historian June Freeman, it grew out of the combination of American household-engineering ideas with the production of standardized building units in 1920s Germany. Before it, many households used large freestanding kitchen cabinets, such as those made by Hoosier in the United States, Poggenpohl in Germany and Hygena in Britain.

Frederick's first household manual was translated into French in 1920 and into German in 1921, as Die rationelle Haushaltführung. Her ideas were taken up by German architects and housing reformers: Bruno Taut discussed The New Housekeeping and its kitchen circulation diagrams at the start of his book Die neue Wohnung (1924), and Erna Meyer's manual Der neue Haushalt (The New Household, 1926) was based on it. An early modernist fitted kitchen, with integrated units and flush countertops, was shown by Benita Otte in the Haus am Horn, the experimental house built for the first Bauhaus exhibition in 1923.

The best-known German attempt to rationalize the kitchen was the Frankfurt kitchen, designed in 1926–27 by the Austrian architect Margarete Schütte-Lihotzky for Ernst May's "New Frankfurt" social housing program. Drawing on time-and-motion studies and on the manuals of Frederick and Meyer, she planned the position of every element to save the housewife labor and movement, while keeping costs low through prefabricated components. With gas supplied to the Frankfurt homes, the kitchen no longer had to heat the family's living space, as her earlier living kitchens in Vienna had done when fuel was scarce. Schütte-Lihotzky's design was not the first fitted kitchen, but it was the first to be mass-produced: around 10,000 were installed in Frankfurt housing developments in the late 1920s and early 1930s, and it has been described as the most influential kitchen of its period.

Kitchen research in Germany came to a halt in the 1930s under National Socialism, but the Frankfurt kitchen was developed further in Sweden, the United States and Switzerland. In the United States, fitted kitchens had become a well-established feature of homes by the mid-1940s. After World War II, a modified version of the Frankfurt kitchen returned to Germany as the "Swedish kitchen" or the American fitted kitchen. The first German built-in kitchen for serial production was presented at the Cologne Furniture Fair in 1950, with wall cabinets and base cabinets that could be installed independently in place of the freestanding kitchen cupboard. In 1956 the sink, oven and refrigerator, until then separate units, were brought together under a single seamless stainless steel countertop.

In Britain, fitted kitchens appeared in significant numbers about a decade later than in the United States, and spread with the economic growth of the 1960s and 1970s. Manufacturers moved in cautiously: from the mid-1950s Hygena, working with the designer George Féjer, first made units that buyers could add to their existing furniture, and by the early 1960s offered fully coordinated modular product lines with built-in stoves and refrigerators. By 1992 about two-thirds of English households had a fitted kitchen.

=== Postwar and open-plan kitchens ===
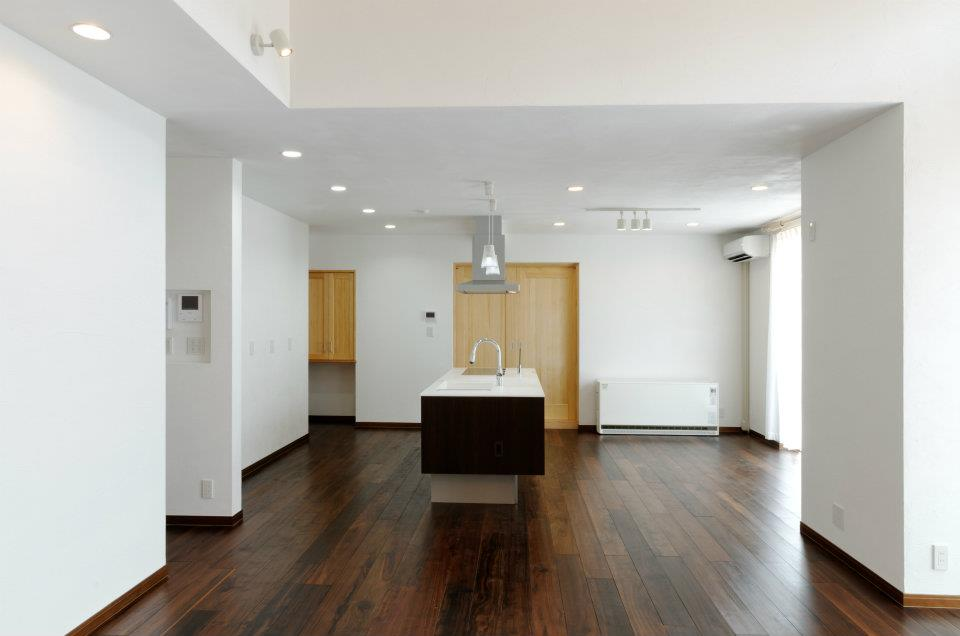
A block kitchen with a kitchen island in the middle

For much of its history the kitchen was treated as a service area, hidden from the rooms used for entertaining in the same way as the servants who worked in it; in the United States it became a more public part of the house over the 20th century as domestic servants disappeared. Frank Lloyd Wright pioneered the open kitchen in his Usonian houses, such as the Willey House in Minneapolis (1934), which did away with the separate dining room and opened the kitchen to the living space. After World War II, architects and design writers promoted the open plan as modern and liberating. In the houses built by Joseph Eichler in California, the kitchen was placed at the center of the plan, from where the housewife could oversee the household. Most American houses, however, adopted only limited versions of the open plan, such as a pass-through between the kitchen and the dining or living area. By the 2010s, the open kitchen had become standard in new construction: in a survey published in 2017, 84 percent of American builders reported that the kitchen and family room in their typical new house were partly or completely open to each other.

In Europe, the closed work kitchen of the 1920s was criticized for cutting the housewife off from her family. In West Germany, serving hatches and breakfast bars began to connect the kitchen to the rest of the home in the 1950s, and from the late 1960s the closed kitchen gave way to the eat-in kitchen. Kitchen islands, first proposed in the 1960s by designers such as John Heritage (1963) and the Swiss firm Novelectric (1965), were soon taken up by manufacturers. By the late 1980s kitchens were increasingly integrated into the living space, with island countertops at which several people could cook together.

In the postwar decades, mass production brought electric appliances within reach of ordinary households in Europe. The refrigerator spread first, its price in West Germany halving between 1952 and 1957, followed by the electric stove and, from the mid-1960s, the freezer. The microwave oven, first sold in 1947 as the Radarange mainly to restaurants and hotels, became available as a countertop appliance in 1967. Its share of American homes rose from 8% in 1977 to 88% in 2005, and it became common in European households from the 1980s.

== Design and layout ==
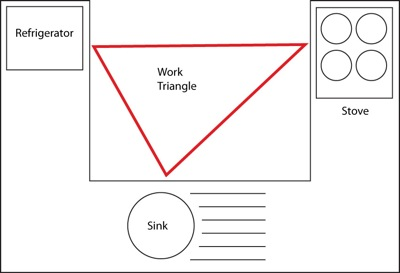
Kitchen work triangle between refrigerator, stove and sink.

Modern kitchen planning commonly groups the main equipment into three work zones: storage at the refrigerator, washing and preparation at the sink, and cooking at the stove. Together these form the work triangle. Recommended sizes vary. The US National Kitchen & Bath Association advises that the three sides add up to no more than 26 feet (7.9 m), while a British handbook describes the traditional triangle as 5 to 7 metres (16 to 23 ft) in total. The triangle was originally conceived for a single cook, so kitchens with several cooks or extra appliances may be planned instead around several work zones or "activity zones". The same applies to kitchens that are part of an open-plan family room. A Swiss guide, for example, sets out five zones in the order work moves through them: food storage, storage of utensils and dishes, washing, preparation, and cooking and baking.

Kitchen layouts are named after the arrangement of their counters and units. A one-wall kitchen has all its work areas along a single wall. An L-shaped kitchen has two runs meeting at a corner. A U-shaped kitchen has three runs, and a G-shaped kitchen is a U with a fourth, partial arm. A galley kitchen has two parallel runs facing each other across a work aisle. Along with the U-shape, it is among the most compact layouts. The term is also used for a single row of units in a narrow space. An island, a freestanding work counter, or a peninsula can be added to most layouts. A Swiss guide calls the L-shape very popular and widespread in Switzerland. In China, the L-shaped, one-wall and U-shaped layouts are the most common, and in one study many owners had added shelving to turn one-wall and L-shaped kitchens into U shapes.

Different types of kitchen layout
One-wall kitchen

L-shaped kitchen

U-shaped kitchen

G-shaped kitchen

Galley kitchen

L-shaped kitchen with an island

L-shaped kitchen with a peninsula

Fitted kitchens are assembled from units of standard sizes. In the United States, base cabinets are usually about 24 inches (61 cm) deep, and the standard countertop height is 36 inches (91 cm). The European standard EN 1116, first issued in 1995 and based on the German DIN 68901, generally sizes units on a 10 centimetres (4 in) grid, with a usual width of 60 centimetres (24 in). Heights were less fixed: as of the mid-2000s, the standard allowed various heights in 10 cm steps, and in practice heights largely followed each manufacturer's own specifications. Switzerland has its own system, introduced in the early 1960s, with units 55 centimetres (22 in) wide. Countertops in Switzerland and Britain are usually about 90 centimetres (35 1/2 in) high, although higher working surfaces are increasingly recommended because people have grown taller.

== Equipment ==
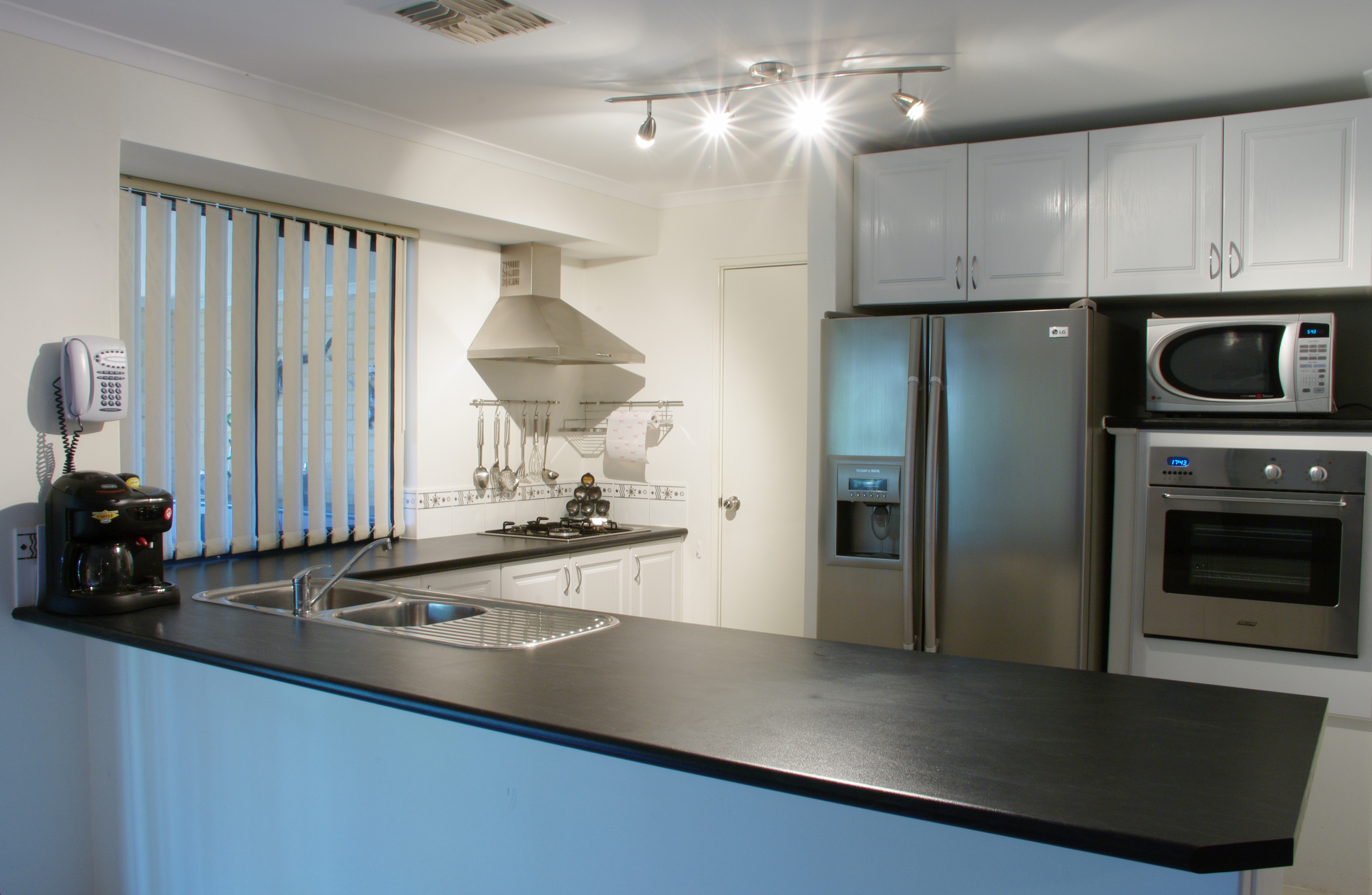
A kitchen in 2010 with a double sink, a gas cooktop under a range hood, a side-by-side refrigerator, and a built-in oven with a microwave above it

The sink, with its water supply, is the most used part of the kitchen, serving both food preparation and cleaning up. A Swiss guide notes that since dishwashers became common in most households, the sink has tended to become a preparation area, or has been reduced to a single large basin. Refrigerators are made in several configurations, with the freezer above, below or beside the fresh-food compartment, and as smaller units that fit under the counter. In developing countries, a refrigerator is one of the first major appliances, after a television, that households acquire as their incomes rise. By 2009, 84% of the Brazilian households with the lowest spending owned one, but very few households in sub-Saharan Africa did. In Britain, the standard kitchen fittings in housing guidance also include space for a washing machine and for recycling bins.

Cooking takes place on the cooktop, where food is fried, boiled or steamed, and in the oven, where it is baked or roasted. The two may be combined in a range, or the oven may be built into a tall cabinet or under the counter. In the United States, electricity is the main cooking fuel for about 63% of people and natural gas for 35%. In Europe, most cooking appliances are electric; gas is used for 36% of cooktops and 16% of ovens. Whereas the range was once the only cooking appliance, kitchens now typically have several. More than 96% of American households have a microwave oven, and in a 2000 survey 59% used it at least as much as the range. Induction cooktops heat the pan through an electromagnetic field rather than heating the cooking surface. Depending on the meal, they can use much less energy than conventional electric cooktops.

In much of the world, cooking still relies on open fires or simple stoves. In 2023, about 2.1 billion people, roughly a quarter of the world's population, cooked mainly with firewood, charcoal, crop waste, kerosene or coal. In rural north India, for example, 72% of households owned a gas stove in 2018 after a government program subsidized connections, but most still cooked mainly with solid fuels. In poorly ventilated homes, the smoke can contain 100 times the acceptable level of fine particles. The World Health Organization attributes 2.9 million deaths a year to such household air pollution. Women and children are the most affected, because they usually do the cooking.

Cooking on a cooktop requires ventilation. Usually this is a range hood above the cooking surface. Alternatively, it can be a system built into the appliance or the counter, which leaves the space above an island or peninsula open. In developed countries, refrigeration accounts for more than 40% of the energy used to store and prepare food at home, cooking for about 20%, and heating water for washing dishes for about 40%.

== Commercial kitchens ==
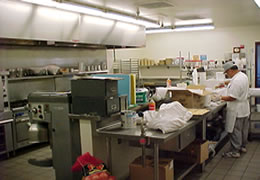
A cafeteria kitchen

Commercial kitchens serve restaurants, cafés, hotels, bars and take-out restaurants, as well as cafeterias in schools, hospitals and workplaces, which are often run by specialist catering contractors. Their work follows a sequence. Food and other supplies are delivered and checked, then stored in separate areas for fruit and vegetables, dry goods, and chilled and frozen foods. They are then prepared, cooked and assembled into meals, after which dishes and utensils are washed and waste is removed. Designers arrange the kitchen so that food moves through these stages in order, without backtracking, which saves labor and reduces the risk of contamination. The kitchen is divided into work sections, each made up of work centers for particular tasks, and its layout depends above all on the menu and the style of service. There is no single correct layout: the leading hamburger chains, for example, each plan their restaurants differently. The kitchen's size depends on the number of meals served at the busiest time, and preparation, cooking and dishwashing together take up about half of its area.

Many establishments do not cook everything from raw ingredients. In large operations, food is often cooked in bulk and then rapidly chilled, for storage of up to a few days, or frozen, for longer. It is then reheated near the place of service. This cook-chill or cook-freeze approach is used in hotels and institutions such as hospitals, and to supply airlines. Hospitals may also assemble meals on conveyor belts, as on a factory assembly line. Fast-food outlets receive their food ready prepared and portioned, chilled or frozen, and cook a limited menu to order with automated equipment that controls cooking times and portions.

Equipment is sized to the kitchen's output. It includes combination ovens that cook with both steam and hot air, tilting frying pans for stewing and braising, and deep fryers. Within each work area, equipment is usually arranged in a straight line, an L or a U. In small kitchens the cooking equipment is often lined up along a wall behind the serving counter, while in larger ones it may be grouped as an island in the middle. Most equipment is made of stainless steel, which does not rust and is easy to clean, and is often raised on legs or casters so the floor beneath can be cleaned. The international food hygiene code of the Codex Alimentarius recommends that the layout of food premises protect against cross-contamination, and that walls, floors and work surfaces be smooth, impervious and easy to clean. In practice, each preparation area has its own sink, raw and cooked foods are kept in separate refrigerators, and hand-washing sinks are placed near the work stations. Dishwashing is done by machine, because washing dishes by hand is considered inefficient and unhygienic for public food service.

== Other types ==
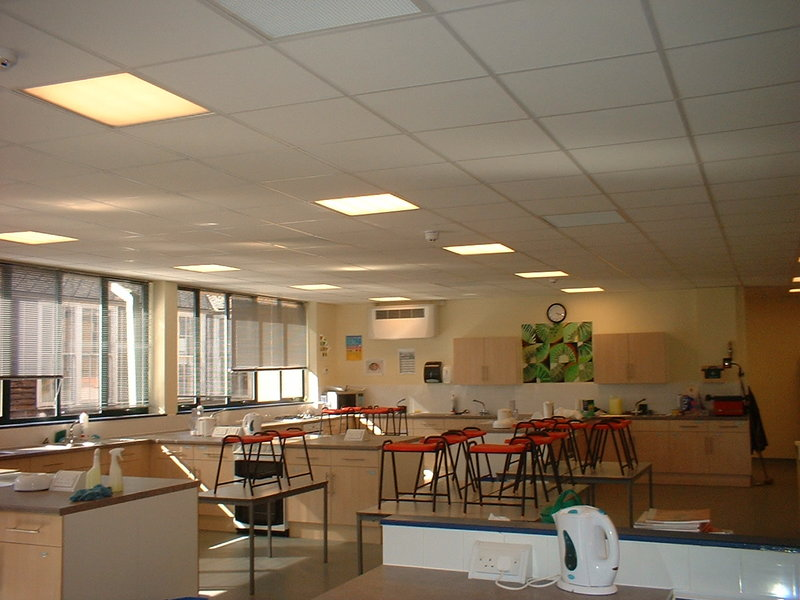
A food technology training kitchen of Marling School in the United Kingdom

The fast food and convenience food trends have changed the manner in which restaurant kitchens operate. Some of these type restaurants may only "finish" convenience food that is delivered to them or just reheat completely prepared meals. At the most they may grill a hamburger or a steak. But in the early 21st century, c-stores (convenience stores) are attracting greater market share by performing more food preparation on-site and better customer service than some fast food outlets.

== By region ==
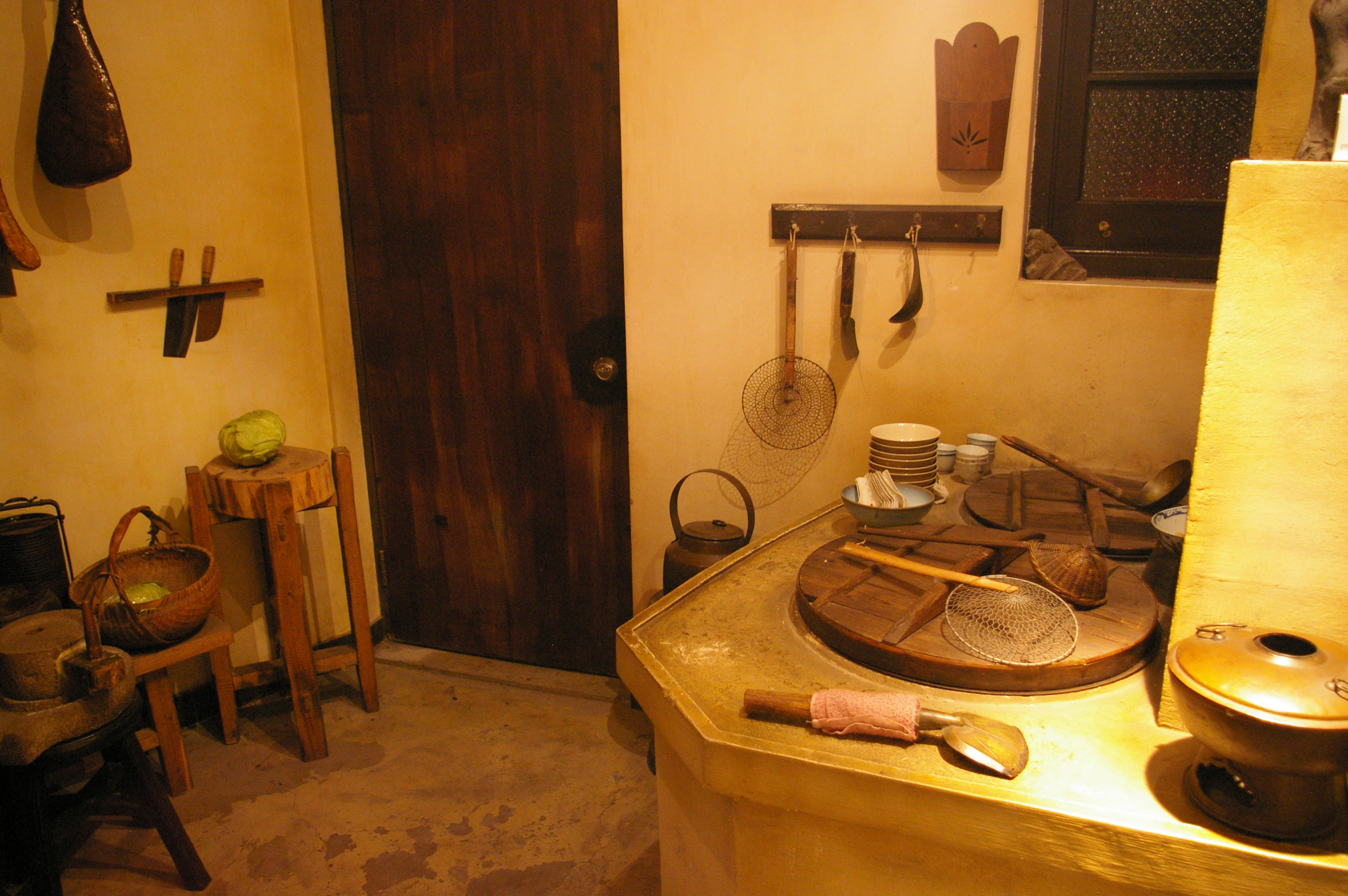
A traditional 1920s Shanghainese shikumen style kitchen, Shikumen Open House Museum

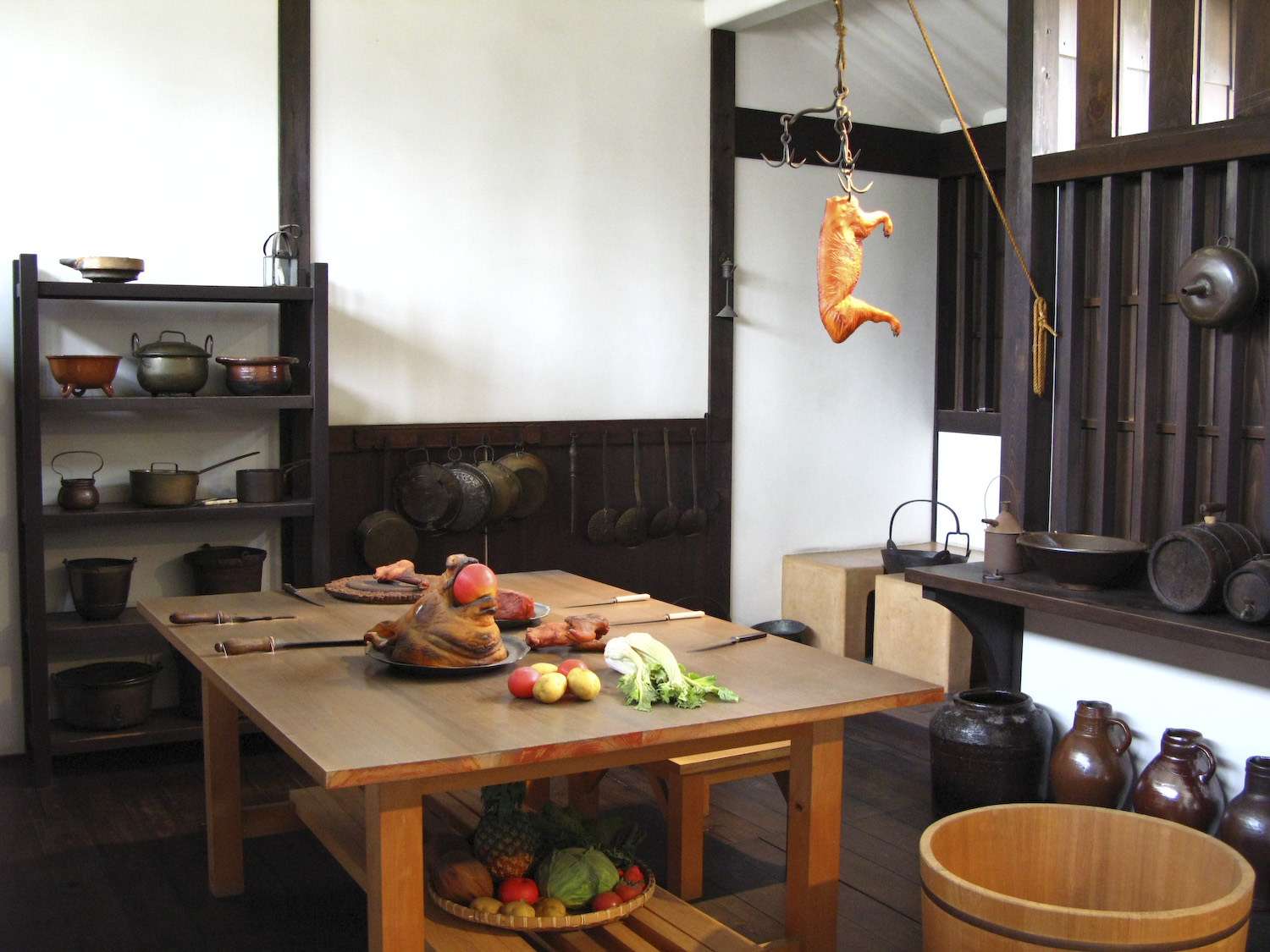
Reconstruction of a 1832 Japanese kitchen in Dejima, Nagasaki, Japan

=== India ===
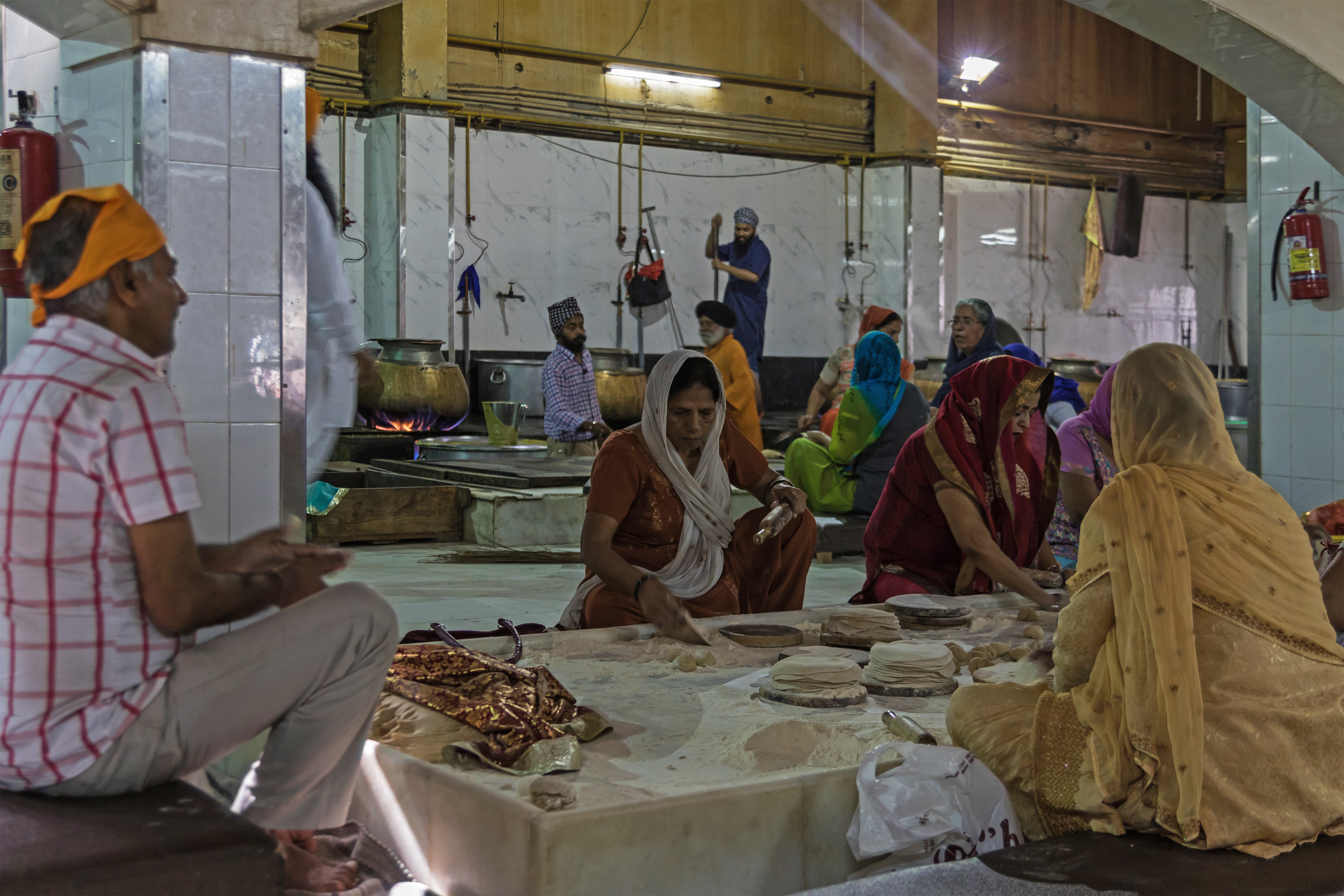
Preparation of bread in the kitchen of Gurudwara Bangla Sahib in New Delhi, India

While many kitchens belonging to poor families continue to use clay stoves and the older forms of fuel, the urban middle and upper classes usually have gas stoves with cylinders or piped gas attached. Electric cooktops are rarer since they consume a great deal of electricity, but microwave ovens are gaining popularity in urban households and commercial enterprises. Indian kitchens are also supported by biogas and solar energy as fuel. World's largest solar energy kitchen is built in India. In association with government bodies, India is encouraging domestic biogas plants to support the kitchen system.

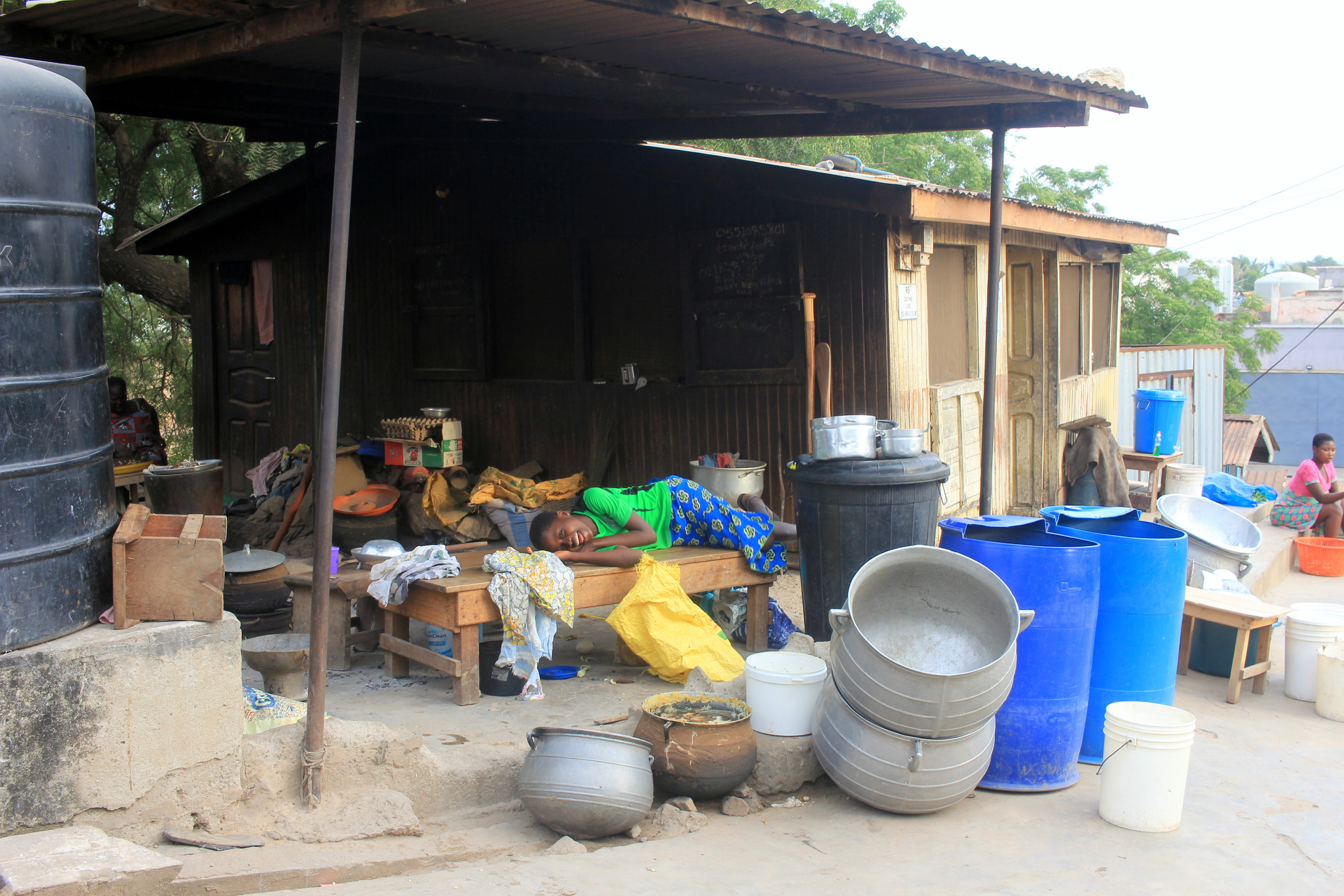
Outdoor kitchen in Takoradi, Ghana

== See also ==
- Cooking techniques
- Cuisine
- Dirty kitchen
- Hearth
- Hoosier cabinet
- Kitchen island
- Kitchen utensil
- Kitchen ventilation
- Universal design
