= Kitchen work triangle =

Concept of an efficient kitchen layout

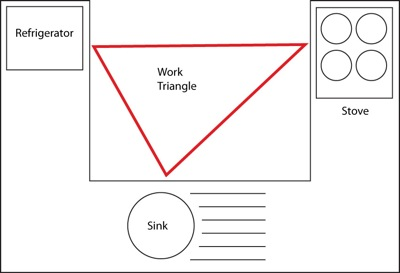
Kitchen triangle between refrigerator, stove and sink.

The areas of a kitchen work triangle is a concept used to determine efficient kitchen layouts that are both aesthetically pleasing and functional. The primary tasks in a home kitchen are carried out between the cook top, the sink and the refrigerator. These three points and the imaginary lines between them make up what kitchen experts call the work triangle. The idea is that when these three elements are close (but not too close) to one another, the kitchen will be easy and efficient to use, cutting down on wasted steps.

There are exceptions to this rule. In single-wall kitchens, it is geometrically impossible to achieve a true triangle, but efficiency can still be achieved through the configuration of the three items and how far apart they are.

== History ==
Work on optimizing kitchen layouts began in the 1920s by Lillian Moller Gilbreth, an industrial psychologist and engineer, in partnership with the Brooklyn Borough Gas Company. Gilbreth's Kitchen Practical was unveiled in 1929 at a Women's Exposition based on Gilbreth's research on motion savings. Gilbreth referred to the L-shaped layout as "circular routing" which later came to be called the kitchen work triangle. A specific model was developed in the 1940s to address the efficiency of the kitchen space between the major work centers: Cooking (range), Preparation (sink/dishwasher) and Food Storage (refrigerator). It was designed to maximize the efficiency of a one-cook kitchen that stemmed from Taylorist principles that had to do with time-motion studies from around the turn of the century. The University of Illinois School of Architecture developed the work triangle to emphasize cost reduction by standardizing construction. This resulted in a variety of configurations.

== Application ==
The kitchen work triangle principle is used by kitchen designers and architects when designing residential kitchens. Recommended dimensions and layouts will vary with different building codes around the world, but some examples are:

- No leg of the triangle should be less than 1.2 m (4 ft) or more than 2.7 m (9 ft).
- The sum of all three sides of the triangle should be between 4–8 m (13–26 ft).
- Cabinets or other obstacles should not intersect any leg of the triangle by more than 30 cm (12 in).
- If possible, there should be no major traffic flow through the triangle.
- A full-height obstacle, such as a tall cabinet, should not come between any two points of the triangle.

Besides the work triangle, there are several rules of thumb to consider when planning a kitchen:

- As measured between countertops and cabinets or appliances, work aisles should be no less than 110 cm (42 in) for one cook, or 120 cm (48 in) for multiple cooks.
- A sink should have a clear counter area of at least 60 cm (24 in) on one side, and at least 45 cm (18 in) on the other side.
- A refrigerator should have a clear counter area of at least 40 cm (15 in) on the handle side; or the same on either side of a side-by-side refrigerator; or the same area on a counter no more than 120 cm (48 in) across from the refrigerator.
- A stove or cooktop should have a clear 40 cm (15 in) area on one side, and at least 30 cm (12 in) on the other side.
- At least 91 cm (36 in) of food preparation area should be located next to the sink.
- In a seating area where no traffic passes behind the diner, allow 80 cm (32 in) from the wall to the edge of the table or counter; if traffic passes behind the diner, allow 110 cm (44 in).
