= Kitchen island =

Freestanding countertop or cabinet in the kitchen

Kitchen with an island

Three people cooking in a kitchen with an island

A kitchen island is a freestanding countertop or cabinet unit in the kitchen that can be accessed from all sides.

Kitchen islands are designed for different shapes and styles in order to accommodate a variety of kitchen arrangements. They also are used to maximize kitchen functionality, given about 40 inches of clearance around the kitchen island. More specifically, they increase storage, countertop, and seating space, while also streamlining culinary workflows while cooking and provide a space for social gatherings.

As of 2026, according to Indian newspaper The Economic Times, the prevalence of kitchen islands is decreasing in favor of L-shaped kitchens with moveable peninsulas or tables with movable legs.

== History ==
A historical kitchen in a wooden house with a wood stove built into an island

During the 2010s, kitchen islands received attention because their multi-functional capabilities were suitable for eating, cooking, and gathering. In 2023, an annual report across the United States by the Bath Association find the average dimensions of kitchens is less than 160 sq ft, where kitchen islands could take up 30 percent of the floor and thus creating obstructions and disrupt circulation. According to the VP of Marketing at Caesarstone, "Kitchen islands are the perfect combination of aesthetic beauty and functionality" and "A clever kitchen island design will increase worktop space, improve storage capacity with innovative storage options and even potentially add a dining option by way of a breakfast bar".

== Design ==
Kitchen islands can come in different shapes, styles, prefabricated or custom built, with each having their advantages and disadvantages on cost and versatility. Some general guidelines for kitchen islands include a minimum width of 36–42 inches, a depth of 18–24 inches, a height of 30–36 inches, and least 42 inches of space on all sides for walking and opening appliances.

=== Pros and cons ===
Kitchen islands are versatile, which range from using it as extra counterspace for food preparation or used for extra storage via cabinets or drawers. However, kitchen islands may make a kitchen feel cramped, incur high initial installation costs, and impede traffic flow.

=== Shapes ===
A curved kitchen peninsula with a bar

There are different shapes of kitchen islands:

- base cabinet - built out of a cabinet as a base, which match the upper cabinets
- galley - added to a galley kitchen
- rectangle
- L-shaped - designed for larger kitchens for an L-shape with walls on two sides
- furniture
- U-shaped - creates a closed kitchen
- curved/circular - often an oval shape to maximize the flow of traffic
- fully functional - contains electrical, sink, drainage, and countertop space
- double-tiered - contains a lower tier to do cooking and a higher tier to eat on
- work table - essentially a tabletop without built-in storage
- rolling kitchen cart - like a portable prep area
- kitchen island bar - has bar seating to eat on
- waterfall - waterfall of stone that continues from the countertops and over the sides of the island
- floating kitchen - affordable counter space that isn't permanent but not as portable as a rolling kitchen cart
- double kitchen island - for larger kitchens to have two kitchen island
- two-tiered - contains a countertop and a lower tier for storage

=== Styles ===
Moreover there are three common styles:

1. Craftsman - classic American design with shaker-style cabinets with natural materials (such as wood and stone)
2. Contemporary - practical, polished, and sophisticated look that may include waterfall countertop edges and bold color schemes and geometric shapes, with materials such as glass, quartz, and steel
3. Farmhouse-style - warm, rustic style with typical elements such as reclaimed wood, distressed finishes, or an apron with creams, whites, blues, and earth tones

=== Considerations ===
When designing for a kitchen island, Homes & Gardens lists some considerations and advice:

- avoid the kitchen island from blocking traffic and walkways
- avoid oversizing the kitchen island for the surrounding kitchen
- avoid adding too functions
- avoid seating arrangements that block workspaces
- avoid installing the main sink on the island
