= Catharine Beecher =

American educator and writer (1800–1878)

Catharine Esther Beecher
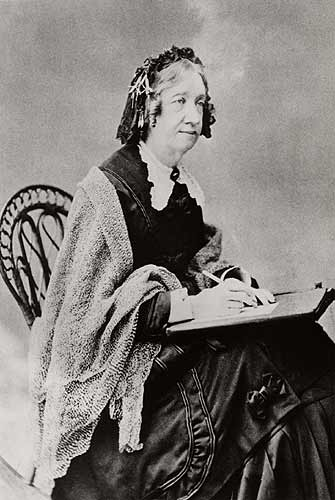
- Born: Catharine Esther Beecher; September 6, 1800; East Hampton, New York, U.S.
- Died: May 12, 1878 (aged 77); Elmira, New York, U.S.
- Occupations: Educator; writer
- Known for: Advocacy for female education, incorporation of kindergarten into education
- Notable work: The American Woman's Home (1869)
- Parent(s): Lyman Beecher; Roxana (Foote) Beecher
- Relatives: Harriet Beecher Stowe (sister); Henry Ward Beecher (brother); Charles Beecher (brother)

Catharine Esther Beecher (September 6, 1800 – May 12, 1878) was an American educator and writer known for her forthright opinions on female education as well as her vehement support of the many benefits of the incorporation of kindergarten into children's education. She published the advice manual The American Woman's Home with her sister Harriet Beecher Stowe in 1869 and was an anti-suffragist. Some sources spell her first name as "Catherine".

== Biography ==
=== Early life and education ===
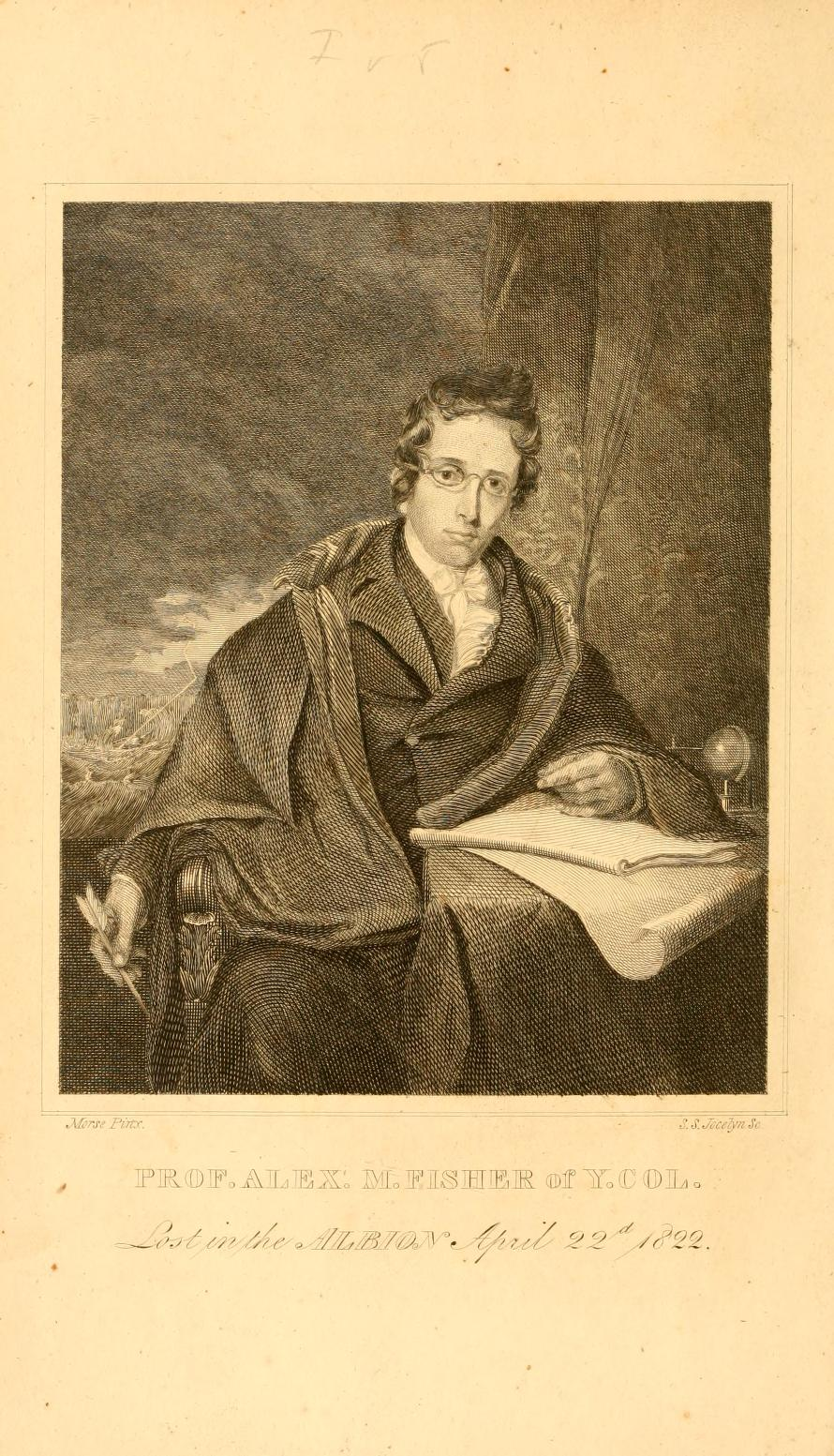
Alexander Metcalf Fisher (1794–1822), fiancé of Catharine Beecher

Beecher was born September 6, 1800, in East Hampton, New York, the daughter of minister and religious leader Lyman Beecher and Roxana (Foote) Beecher. Among her siblings were writer and abolitionist Harriet Beecher Stowe, along with clergymen Henry Ward Beecher and Charles Beecher. Beecher was educated at home until she was ten years old, when she was sent to Litchfield Female Academy in Litchfield, Connecticut. She taught herself subjects not commonly offered to women, including math, Latin, and philosophy. She took over the domestic duties of her household at the age of 16, following her mother's death. In 1821, Beecher founded a school for women in New Haven, Connecticut. Catharine was engaged to marry Alexander M. Fisher, head of the Mathematics Department at Yale College, but he died at sea before the wedding took place. She never married.

=== Female seminary ===
To provide educational opportunities for others, in 1823 Beecher and her sister, Mary Foote Beecher Perkins, co-founded the Hartford Female Seminary in Hartford, Connecticut, where she taught until 1832. The private girls' school had many well-known alumnae.

Comprehending the deficiencies of existing textbooks, she prepared, primarily for use in her own school, some elementary books in arithmetic, a work on theology, and one on mental and moral philosophy. The last was never published, although printed and used as a college textbook.

She was constantly making experiments, and practicing them upon the girls, weighing all their food before they ate it, holding that Graham flour and the Graham diet were better for them than richer food. Ten of her pupils invited her to dine with them at a restaurant. She accepted the invitation, and the excellent dinner changed her views. Thereafter they were served with more palatable food.

=== Opposition to Indian Removal Bill ===
In 1829 and 1830, Beecher led a women's movement to protest the Indian Removal Bill of President Andrew Jackson. The protest was the first national campaign on the part of women in the United States.

In the bill, Jackson requested that Congress approve the use of federal money to resettle southeastern American Indians, including the Cherokee, to land west of the Mississippi River. In response, Beecher published a "Circular Addressed to the Benevolent Ladies of the U. States", dated December 25, 1829, calling on women to send petitions to Congress protesting the removal. In the circular, she wrote, "It has become almost a certainty that these people are to have their lands torn from them, and to be driven into western wilds and to final annihilation, unless the feelings of a humane and Christian nation shall be aroused to prevent the unhallowed sacrifice."

Congress nevertheless passed the bill, and the Indian Removal Act became law on May 28, 1830.

=== Midlife in the West ===
In 1832, Beecher moved with her father to Walnut Hills, Cincinnati, where he became head of the new Lane Seminary, to campaign for more schools and teachers in the frontier. There she opened a female seminary, which, on account of her failing health, was discontinued after two years. She then devoted herself to the development of an extended plan for the physical, social, intellectual, and moral education of women, to be promoted through a national board. For nearly 40 years, she labored perseveringly in this work, organizing societies for training teachers, establishing plans for supplying the territories with good educators, writing, pleading, and traveling. Her object, as she described it, was "to unite American women in an effort to provide a Christian education for 2,000,000 children in our country." She made her field of labor especially in the West and South, and sought the aid of educated women throughout the United States.

=== Later life and death ===
In 1837, Beecher retired from administrative work. After returning East she started the Ladies' Society for Promoting Education in the West. In 1847 she co-founded the Board of National Popular Education with William Slade, a former Congressman and then governor of Vermont. In 1852 she founded the American Women's Educational Association. Their goal was to recruit and train teachers for frontier schools and send women into the West to civilize the young. Their efforts became a model for future schools developed in the West.

Woman's great mission is to train immature, weak, and ignorant creatures to obey the laws of God; the physical, the intellectual, the social, and the moral.

It was claimed that hundreds of the best teachers the West received were sent under the patronage of this system. To a certain extent the plans succeeded, and were found beneficial, but the careers of the teachers were mostly short, for they soon married.

In The American Woman's Home, published in 1869, Beecher and her sister presented a model home from a woman's perspective. The kitchen was inspired by a cook's galley in a steamship. A movable partition on wheels provided flexibility and privacy in the small home, and also served as a wardrobe. Chapters of the book discussing ventilation and heating anticipated modern central heating.

On May 12, 1878, Beecher died from apoplexy.

== Views on and advocacy of education ==
In 1841 Beecher published A Treatise on Domestic Economy for the Use of Young Ladies at Home and at School, a book that discussed the underestimated importance of women's roles in society. The book was edited and re-released the following year in its final form. Catharine

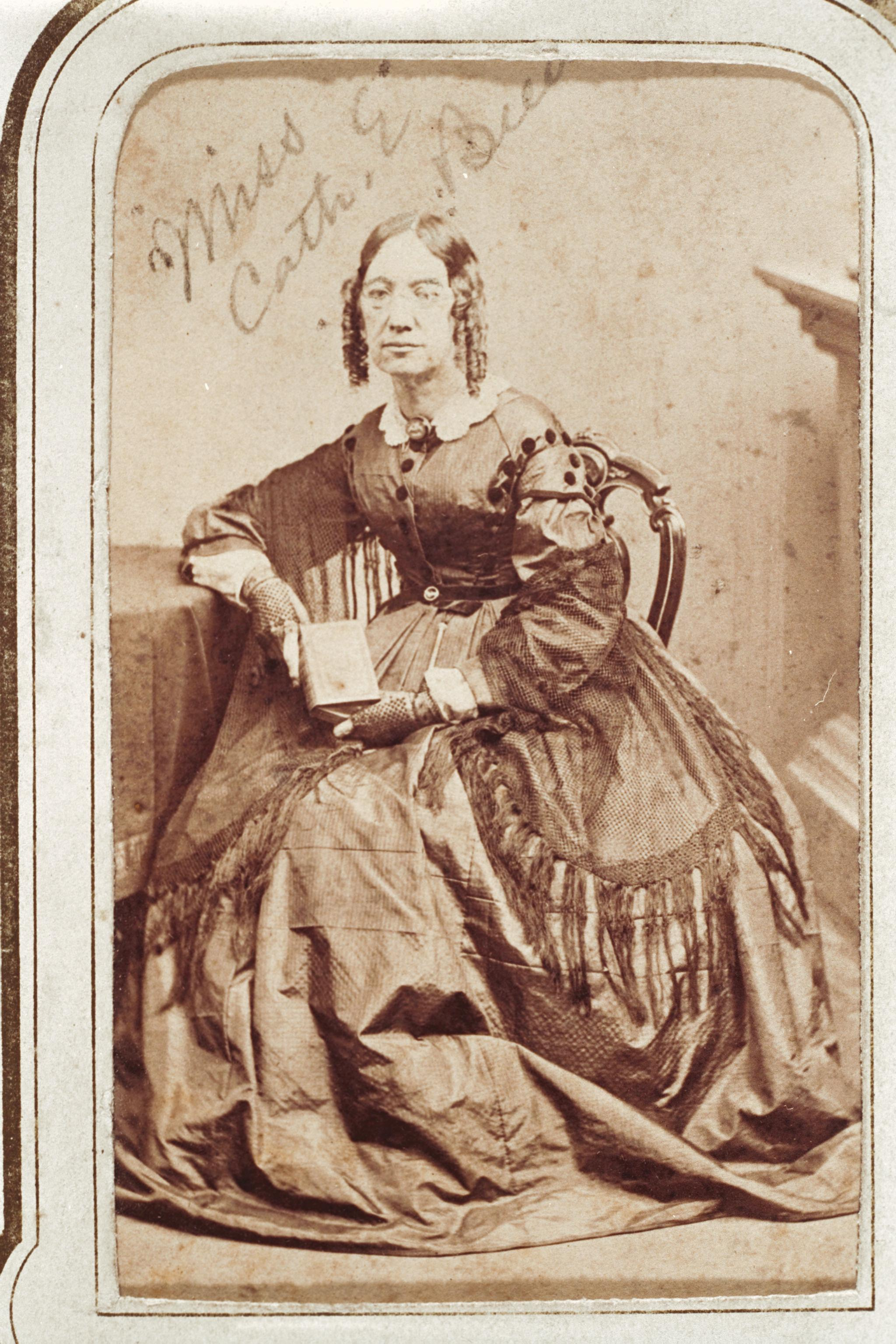
Catharine Beecher, c. 1858-1862

In 1831, Catharine Beecher suggested that teachers read aloud to students from passages by writers with elegant styles, "to accustom the ear to the measurement of the sentences and the peculiar turns of expression". She went on to have the students imitate the piece just read using similar words, style, and turns of phrase in order to develop "a ready command of the language and easy modes of expression". In 1846, Beecher pronounced that women, not men, should educate children, and established schools for training teachers in Western cities. She advocated that young ladies find godly work as Christian teachers away from the larger Eastern cities. The Board of National Popular Education, which was her idea, trained teachers in four-week sessions in Connecticut and then sent them out West. She believed that women had a higher calling to shape children and society. Along with a Treatise on Domestic Economy for the Use of Young Ladies at Home and at School, Beecher also published The Duty of American Women to Their Country in 1845 and The Domestic Receipt Book in 1846. Beecher's views on education and women's work were also somewhat contradictory. She believed in the preparedness of female teachers to aid in their teaching of children from unfortunate homes. At the same time, she worked to teach mothers how to care for their families. Beecher laid the groundwork for a lot of future Family and Consumer Science Education. Many of her books like the Domestic Receipt Book helped people to learn how to manage their household budgets with ease.

=== Views on education ===
Beecher recognized public schools' responsibility to influence the moral, physical, and intellectual development of children. She promoted the expansion and development of teacher training programs, holding that teaching was more important to society than lawyers or doctors. Beecher also supported home education. In her textbook A Treatise on Domestic Economy, she pointed out the 'senselessness of an educated woman doing her own sewing while paying someone else to teach the children instead of farming out the sewing and teaching the children.' Beecher was a strong advocate of the inclusion of daily physical education, and developed a program of calisthenics that was performed to music. She also firmly believed in the benefits of reading aloud. Catherine Beecher believed that tight corsets and bad eating habits ruined the young women's health. She believed the primary purpose of education was to develop a young child's basis for their conscience and morals.

=== Women as educators ===
Beecher believed that women have inherent qualities that make them the preferred gender as teachers. As men left teaching to pursue business and industry, she saw the untapped potential of educated women and encouraged education of women to fill the increasing need for teachers. She considered women natural teachers, with teaching as an extension of their domestic role.

== Influential changes over time ==
In 1862, John Brinsley recommended that students analyze and imitate classical Greek and Latin models, while Beecher recommended English writers. They both believed that frequent practice and the study of important authors helped students acquire writing skills.

Beecher founded The American Woman's Educational Association in 1852, an organization focused on furthering educational opportunities for women. She also founded the Western Female Institute in Cincinnati (along with her father Lyman) and The Ladies Society for Promoting Education in the West. She was also instrumental in the establishment of women's colleges in Burlington, Iowa; Quincy, Illinois; and Milwaukee, Wisconsin.

Beecher strongly supported allowing children to simply be children and not prematurely forcing adulthood onto them. She believed that children lacked the experience needed to make important life decisions and that in order for them to become healthy self-sufficient adults, they needed to be allowed to express themselves freely in an environment suited to children. It was these beliefs that led to her support of a system of kindergartens.

=== Anti-suffragist ===
Beecher thought that women could best influence society as mothers and teachers, and did not want women to be corrupted by the evils of politics. She felt that men and women were put on the earth for separate reasons and accepted the view that women should not be involved in politics, but rather, they would teach male children to be free thinkers and moral learners and help shape their political ideas.

== Legacy ==
Three universities named buildings for Beecher: Central Connecticut State University, The University of Connecticut, and The University of Cincinnati. The Cincinnati building has since been demolished.

== Schools ==
- 1823: Hartford Female Seminary: Beecher co-founded the Hartford Female Seminary, which was a school to train women to be mothers and teachers. It began with one room and seven students; within three years, it grew to almost 100 students, with 10 rooms and 8 teachers. The school had small class sizes, where advanced students taught other students. All classes were connected to general principles, and students were motivated to go beyond the classes' texts and instruction.
- 1832: Western Female Institute
- 1852: The Ladies Society for Promoting Education in the West founded colleges in Burlington, Iowa; Quincy, Illinois; and Milwaukee, Wisconsin. The Milwaukee Female College changed names several times. Today, as Downer College of Lawrence University of Appleton WI, it is the longest continuously operating college for women's higher education founded on the Beecher plan.

== Selected works ==
- — (1829). Suggestions Respecting Improvements in Education, presented to the Trustees of the Hartford Female Seminary, and published at their request. Hartford: Packard & Butler.
- — (1830). Letters on the Difficulties of Religion. Hartford: Bellnap and Hamerley.
- The Elements of Mental and Moral Philosophy, Founded Upon Experience, Reason, and the Bible. Peter B. Gleason & Co. 1831.
- — (1833). Arithmetic Simplified; prepared for the use of primary schools, ladies' seminaries, and high schools. In three parts. Hartford: D. F. Robinson.
- — (1835). An essay on the education of female teachers : written at the request of the American Lyceum and communicated at their annual meeting, New York, May 8th, 1835. New York: Van Nostrand.
- — (1837). An Essay on Slavery and Abolitionism with reference to the Duty of American Females. Philadelphia: Henry Perkins.
- — (1838). The Moral Instructor for Schools and Families: Containing Lessons on the Duties of life. Cincinnati.
- — (1842). A Treatise on Domestic Economy for the Use of Young Ladies at Home and at School. Boston: T.H. Webb.
- — (1844). Memoirs of her brother, George Beecher.
- — (1845). The Duty of American Women to Their Country.
- — (1846). The Evils Suffered by American women and Children: the Causes and Remedy.
- — (1846). Miss Beecher's domestic receipt book; designed as a supplement to her treatise on donestic economy. Harper's.
- — (1850). Truth Stranger than Fiction. Boston., an account of an infelicitous domestic affair in which some of her friends were involved
- — (1851). True Remedy for the Wrongs of Women, with a History of an Enterprise having that for its Object. Boston.
- — (1855). Letters to the People on Health and Happiness. New York.
- — (1856). Physiology and Calisthenics for Schools and Families. New York: Harper.
- — (1857). Common Sense applied to Religion., a book containing many striking departures from Calvinistic theology
- — (1860). An Appeal to the People, as the Authorized Interpreters of the Bible. Harper.
- — (1864). Religious Training of Children in the School, the Family, and the Church.
- —; Stowe, Harriet Beecher (1869). The American woman's home, or, Principles of domestic science : being a guide to the formation and maintenance of economical, healthful, beautiful, and Christian homes. New York. Archived from the original on April 8, 2016.
- —; Stowe, Harriet Beecher (1870). Principles of Domestic Science as applied to the Duties and Pleasures of Home. A textbook for the use of young ladies in schools, seminaries, and colleges. New York: J. B. Ford.
- — (1871). Woman's Profession as Mother and Educator, with Views in Opposition to Woman Suffrage. Philadelphia.
- — (1873). Miss Beecher's housekeeper and healthkeeper: containing five hundred recipes for economical and healthful cooking; also, many directions for securing health and happiness. New York: J. B. Ford.
- — (1874). Educational reminiscences and suggestions.
