= The American Woman's Home =

1869 book by Catharine Beecher and Harruet Beecher Stowe

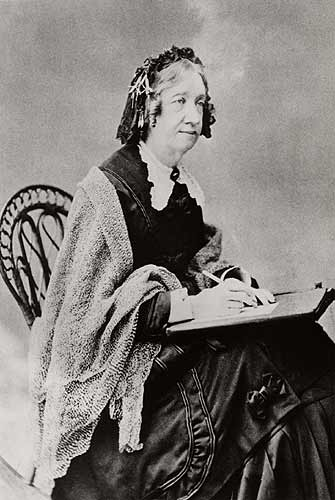
Portrait of Catharine Beecher

The American Woman's Home is a book published in 1869, co-authored by Catharine Beecher and her sister Harriet Beecher Stowe. It expands upon Catharine's 1841 book, A Treatise on Domestic Economy, which aimed to codify women's housekeeping duties and draw attention to the importance of this labor. The American Woman's Home presents the sisters' views on domesticity and how these ideals shaped their vision of a proper American household. The American Woman's Home prioritizes necessity over excessive furnishing or decor. It also seeks to eliminate the distinction between private and public spaces by creating communal spaces and eliminating the need for servants. These features, the sisters believed, would allow women's roles of housework and nurturing the family to thrive. The book remains a foundational text in modern house design.

== Background ==
=== Personal life ===
Catharine Beecher was born on September 6, 1800, in East Hampton, New York, and died on May 12, 1878. She was the daughter of the Congregationalist minister, Lyman Beecher, and of Roxana Beecher. Catharine had two prominent siblings, Henry Ward Beecher and sister Harriet Beecher Stowe. While Roxana tended to the family and maintenance of the home, Lyman was a prominent revivalist and social reformer amidst the nineteenth century. In 1816, Roxana Beecher died of consumption. Consequently, Catharine Beecher assumed and performed many domestic responsibilities, including cutting and sewing her and her sibling's clothes. These responsibilities, alongside Beecher's close relationship with her father, greatly influenced her later role as an educator and her ideas about family life. Her father's continued support encouraged her work.

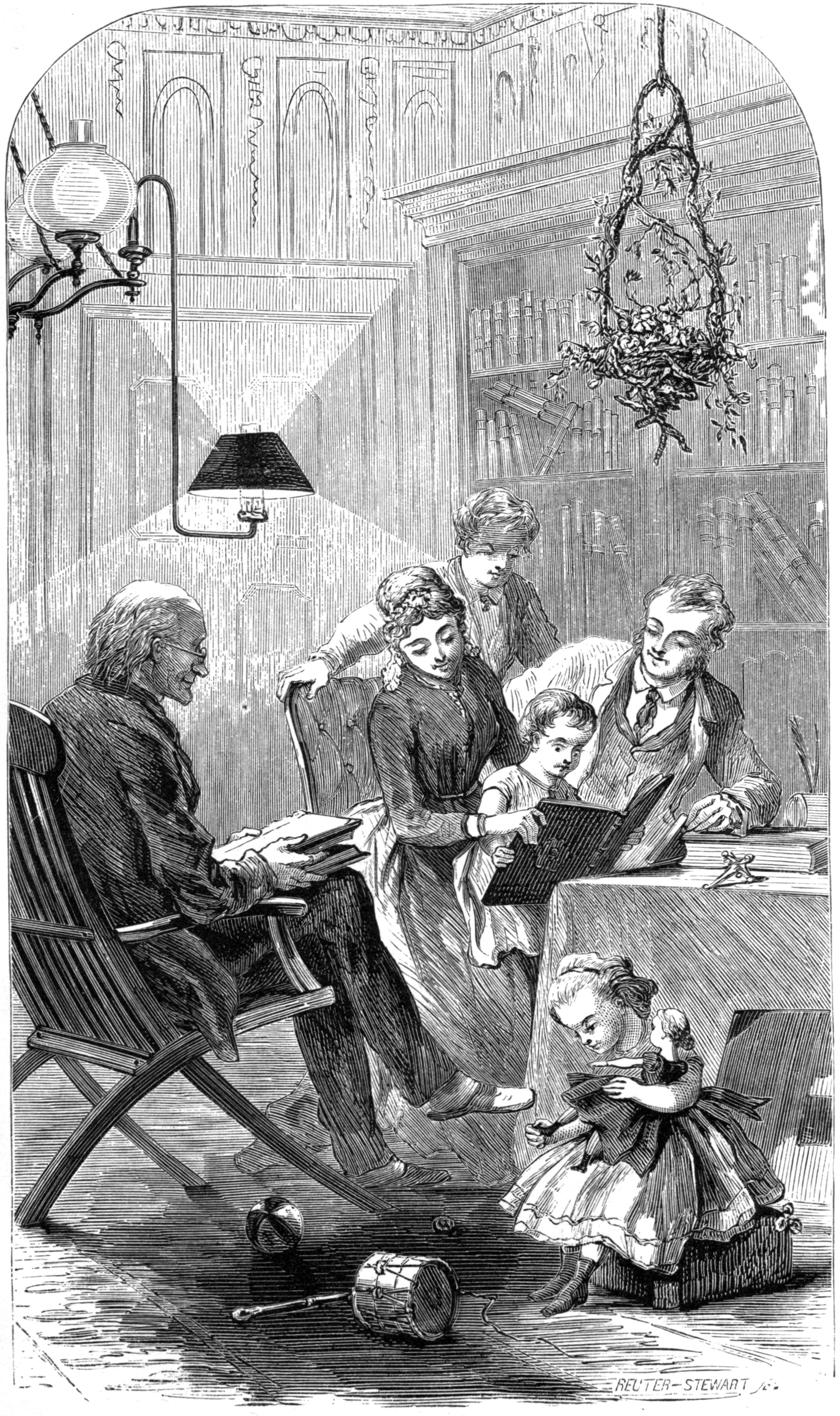
The American Woman's Home, book frontispiece, 1869.

Catharine Beecher became one of the most prominent figures in women's education during the nineteenth century. She worked as an educational reformer and Home Economics educator. In 1823, Catharine established the Hartford Female Seminary, one the first large educational institutions for women in the United States. The 1820s–50s marked the beginning of women's education past age 12 that expanded beyond baseline literacy. Her career in education continued until she died in 1878 when she was working to implement Home Economics courses in public institutions.

=== Historical context ===
Catherine Beecher and Harriet Beecher Stowe wrote their book in the middle of the nineteenth century when many feminist counterparts focused goals on women's suffrage. While sharing the desire to elevate women to equality with men, the Beecher sisters believed that this goal would not be achieved through suffrage. Instead, they believed that men and women occupied distinct roles in society, and women's primary role – homemaking – needed to be included in the liberal education of universities. Beecher and Stowe defined homemaking as understanding and operating kitchen technology, ventilation, heating, plumbing, and other child-rearing tasks. More specifically, the sisters believed educating young children, caring for babies, children, and the sick, and managing the household to be a part of women's homemaking responsibilities. Once women were able to master their role as homemakers through higher education, their dominance over the domestic sphere would be utilized by women to gain political and social influence.

In The American Woman's Home, the sisters drew inspiration from the interiors of 16th and 17th-century Puritan households, especially by how they directly suited the functions and needs of their families. By adopting the functionality and practicality of Puritan homes, the Beecher sisters aimed to improve the daily lives of families through their nineteenth-century home designs.

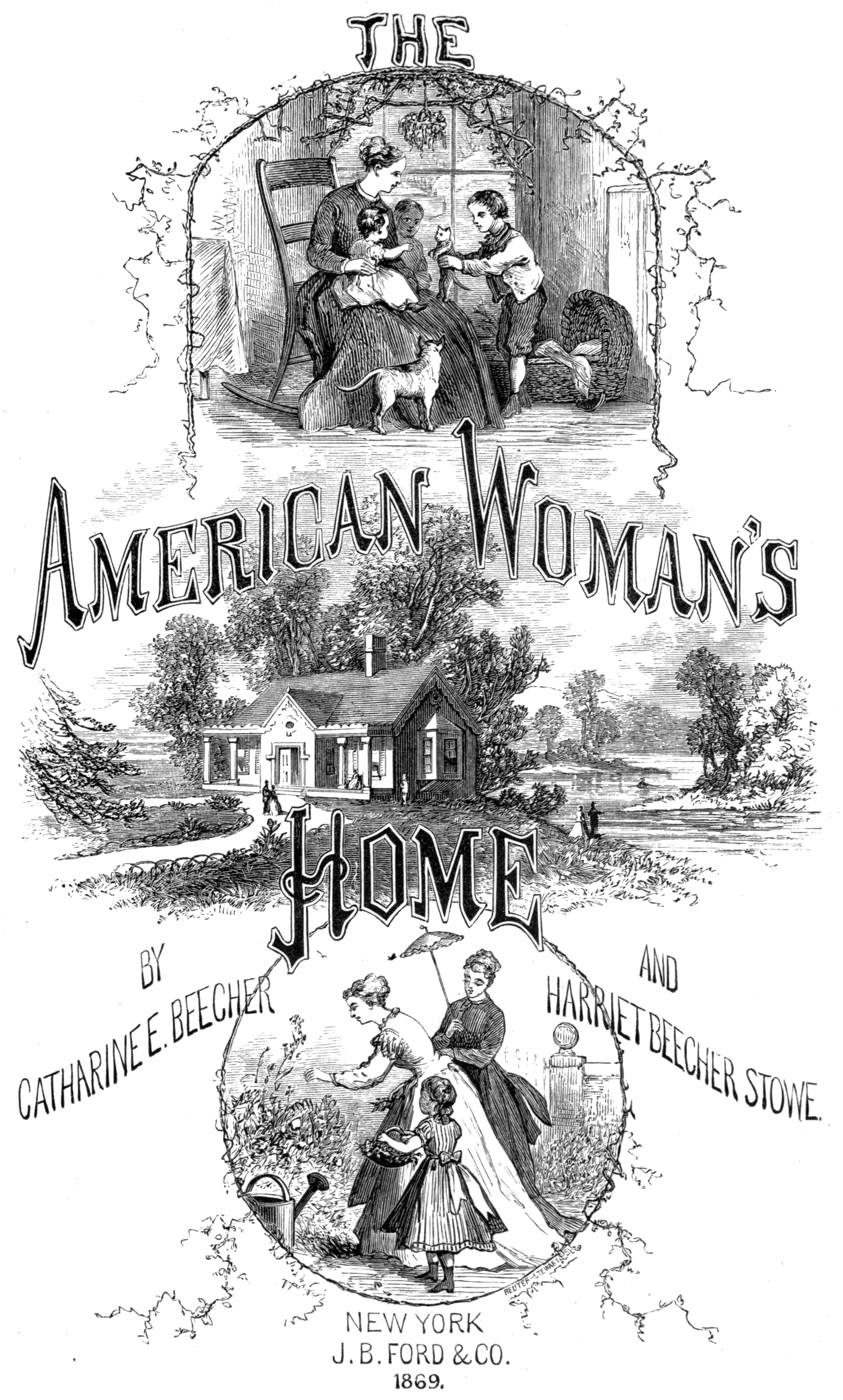
The American Woman's Home, Title Illustration, 1869.

== Synopsis ==
The American Woman's Home contained thirty-six chapters that covered a large variety of subjects, ranging from home design and decoration, domestic work inside and outside of the home, Christian lifestyle, parenting and child-rearing advice, and scientific explanations of systems within the body, home, and world.

The American Woman's Home is a highly detailed manual regarding the ideal American home's construction, design, layout, and decoration. The book includes diagrams and explanations of floor plans, furniture layouts for each room, home appliance choices, and furniture and decor creation. The Beechers' ideal family home was a modest two-story cottage with communal spaces such as the kitchen on the first floor, bedrooms on the second floor, and utility and storage spaces in the basement. This cottage would be small but inherently complex to maximize efficiency. In the kitchen layout, appliances, and counters are a short distance away from each other, so one person can easily manage multiple tasks at once. The complex kitchen design also included storage spaces for ingredients commonly used in everyday cooking. For the rest of the home, the Beecher sisters included furniture descriptions and explained how furniture could be easily built at home or made cost-effectively by a craftsperson. They also offered specific techniques, such as how to transform a wardrobe into a room divider, the multi-purpose design aiding in the cost-effectiveness. In the book, the Beecher sisters specifically opposed the use of fanciful and ornate decor. Instead, they argued for the reallocation of decor funds towards kitchen appliances and the aforementioned improvements to the function of the kitchen.

== Legacy ==
The American Woman's Home coincided with the communitarian movement, which advocated for communal living during its initial rise in popularity during the 1840s. This movement had a notable resurgence in the 1870s, partly due to the publication of The American Woman's Home. The methods of home ventilation and general cleanliness it outlined also contributed to some nineteenth-century public health reforms of the antebellum era and Gilded Age.

After its publication in 1869, The American Woman's Home became a foundational text for the field of home economics – contributing to the tenth annual Lake Placid Conferences in 1909 on Home Economics as well as the American Home Economics Association. At this conference, Ellen H. Richards, the first female student at the Massachusetts Institute of Technology, cited Catharine Beecher and her work as a foundational piece to the field of home economics.

In the present day, the Beecher sister's kitchen design has been cited as an early example of modern home design. While many elements of their proposed home designs did not influence the structure of 20th-century American homes, their work emphasized the flexibility of home appliances and storage units. Today, flexibility and utility are valued greatly within modern home design to accommodate different families over multiple lifetimes.
